= Somunju Baba =

Turkish Muslim saint and ascetic teacher

Shaykh Hamid-i Vali
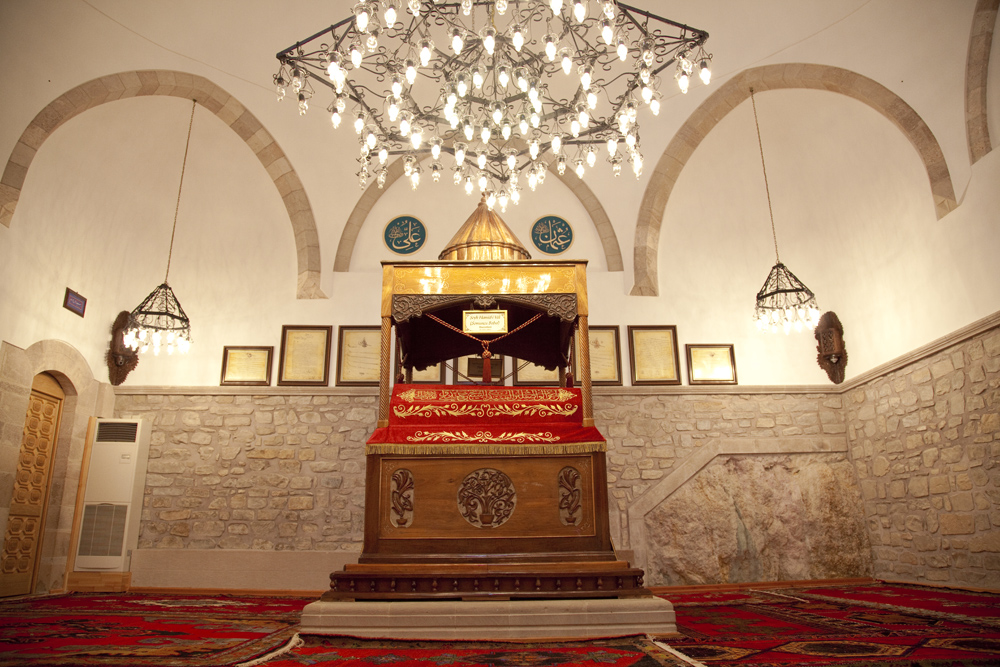
- The cenotaph of Somuncu Baba

Personal life
- Born: 1331 Kayseri
- Died: 1412 (aged 80–81) Aksaray
- Children: Halil Taybi (son); Yusuf Hakiki Baba (son)
- Other name: Somunju Baba
- Occupation: Ascetic teacher of Islam

Religious life
- Religion: Islam

Muslim leader
- Students: Haji Bayram Veli Shams al-Din al-Fanari Akshamsaddin Akbıyık Sultan Sheyh Üftade Aziz Mahmud Hudayi Halil Taybi Baba Yusuf Hakiki Bıçakçı Ömer Dede Hızır Dede İnce Bedreddin Yazıcıoğlu Sheyh Lütfullah Şeyhî Muslihiddin Halife Uzun Selahaddin

Shaykh Hamid-i Vali (Turkish: Şeyh Hamid-i Veli) (1331–1412), better known by his sobriquet Somunju Baba (Turkish: Somuncu Baba), was an ascetic teacher of Islam in Bursa, Turkey, who exerted extensive influence and is known as a Muslim saint. He was born in Kayseri and died in Aksaray. He taught at the Great Mosque of Bursa (Turkish: Ulu Camii) where he was installed by Sultan Bayezid I after it was completed. Somunju Baba's students included Molla Fenari and Haji Bayram Veli.

== Biography ==
Somunju Baba is the son of Shamsaddin Musa al-Kaysari, an adept of the Sufi schools of Khorasan who came to spread Islam in Anatolia. There are claims that his lineage traces back to the Islamic Prophet Muhammad through 24 generations. He received his early education from his father before going to study further in great cities like Damascus, Tabriz, Ardabil. He completed his spiritual training under the Safavid order before it turned to Shi'ism. The spread of the Safavid order in Anatolia could partially be due to the work of Hamid-i Vali.

He then returned to Anatolia and settled in Bursa. There, he built a bakery next to his hermitage, where he baked bread and distributed it to people. This earned him the names "Somuncu Baba" (Father Loaf) and "Ekmekçi Koca" (Master Baker). Somunju Baba was invited to the inauguration of the Grand Mosque of Bursa where he delivered a sermon, interpreting surah Al-Fatiha in seven different ways. The sermon deeply moved the congregation, including the Sultan Bayezid I himself. Fearing fame due to his growing spiritual reputation, Shaykh Hamid-i Vali left Bursa.

According to Abdurrahman al-Askari, after leaving Bursa, Somuncu Baba settled in a village near Kozan (Sis) Castle by the Ceyhan River, where Haji Bayram Veli later visited him. After staying there for some time, he traveled to Damascus and then performed Hajj in Mecca. Upon returning, he settled in Aksaray. There, he educated Haji Bayram Veli in both worldly and religious sciences and entrusted him with the duty of spiritual guidance in Ankara.

Somuncu Baba died in 1412. His funeral prayer was led by Haji Bayram Veli in Aksaray, and he was buried at the site of his present-day tomb.

It is known that Somuncu Baba had two sons, Yusuf Haqiqi and Khalil Taybi. Yusuf Haqiqi remained in Aksaray, where he died, while Khalil Taybi settled in Darende. Some sources suggest that Somuncu Baba is buried alongside his son Khalil Taybi in the Hıdırlık region of Darende.

With the support of the Es-Seyyid Osman Hulusi Efendi Foundation, the site was restored and expanded into a complex featuring an additional mosque, a library, a museum, and an exhibition hall. Thanks to these developments, it has become a popular destination for both local and foreign visitors

== Somunju Baba's protégés ==
- Haji Bayram Veli of Ankara
- Molla Shemseddin Fenari of Bursa
- Akşemseddin of Göynük
- Akbıyık Sultan of Bursa
- Sheyh Üftade of Bursa
- Aziz Mahmud Hudayi of Bursa
- Halil Taybi of Darende
- Baba Yusuf Hakiki of Aksaray
- Bıçakçı Ömer Dede of Göynük
- Hızır Dede of Bursa
- İnce Bedreddin of Darende
- Yazıcıoğlu of Gelibolu
- Sheyh Lutfullah of Balıkesir
- Şeyhî of Kütahya
- Muslihiddin Halife of İskilip
- Uzun Selahaddin of Bolu

== Somuncu Baba Tomb and Mosque in Darende ==
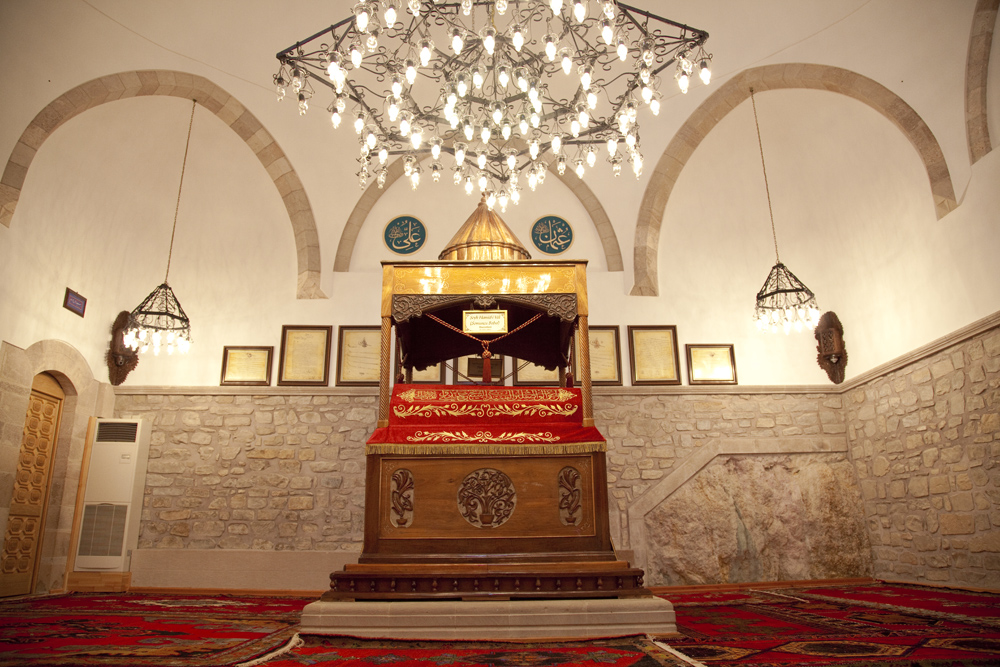
Somunju Baba Tomb in Darende

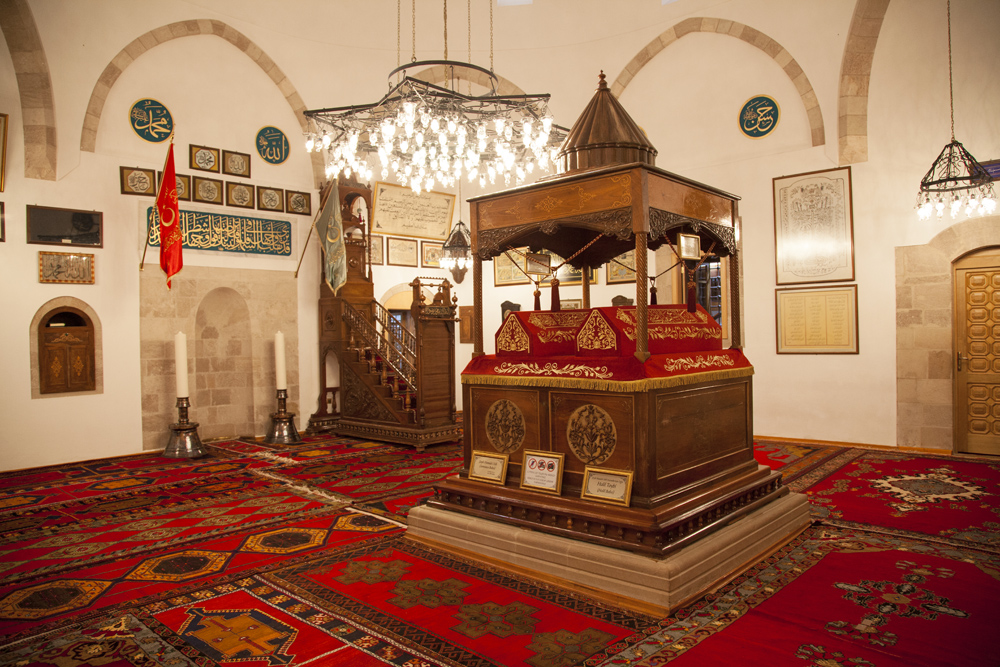
Somunju Baba Tomb in Darende

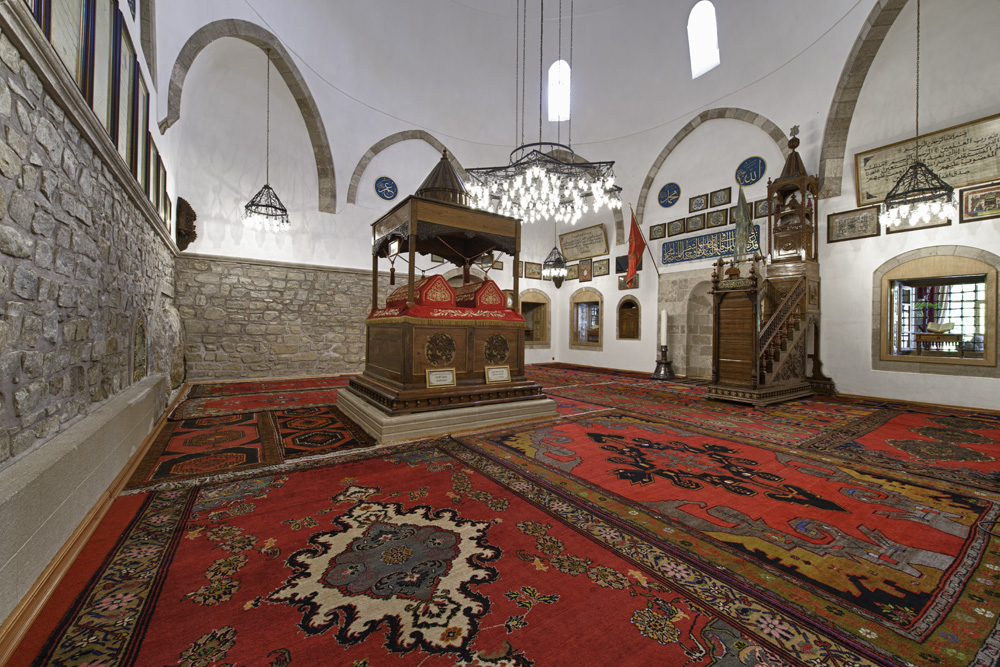
Somunju Baba Tomb in Darende

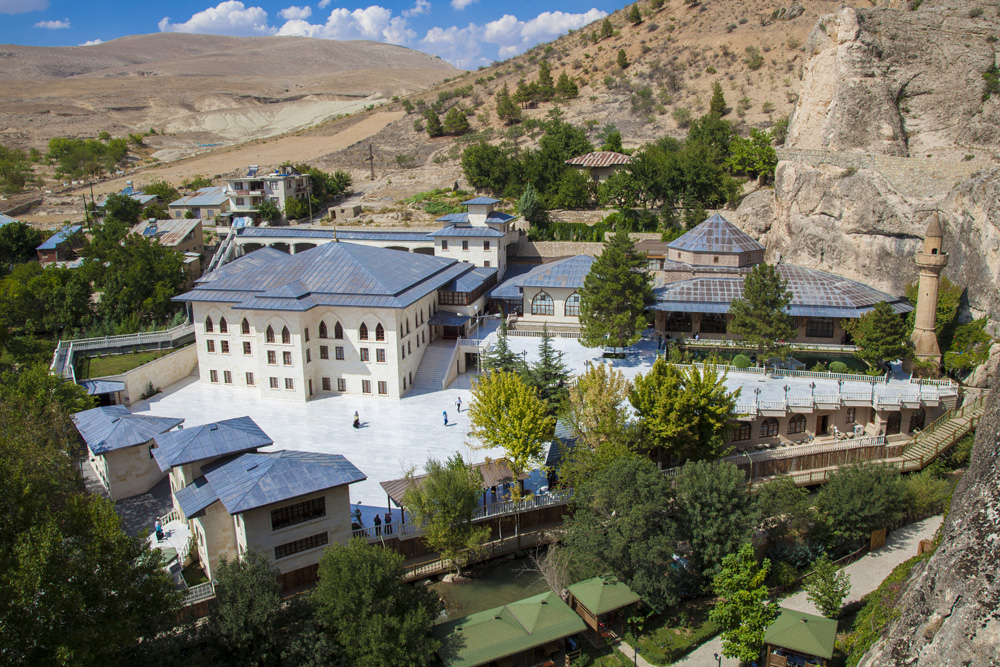
Somunju Baba Mosque

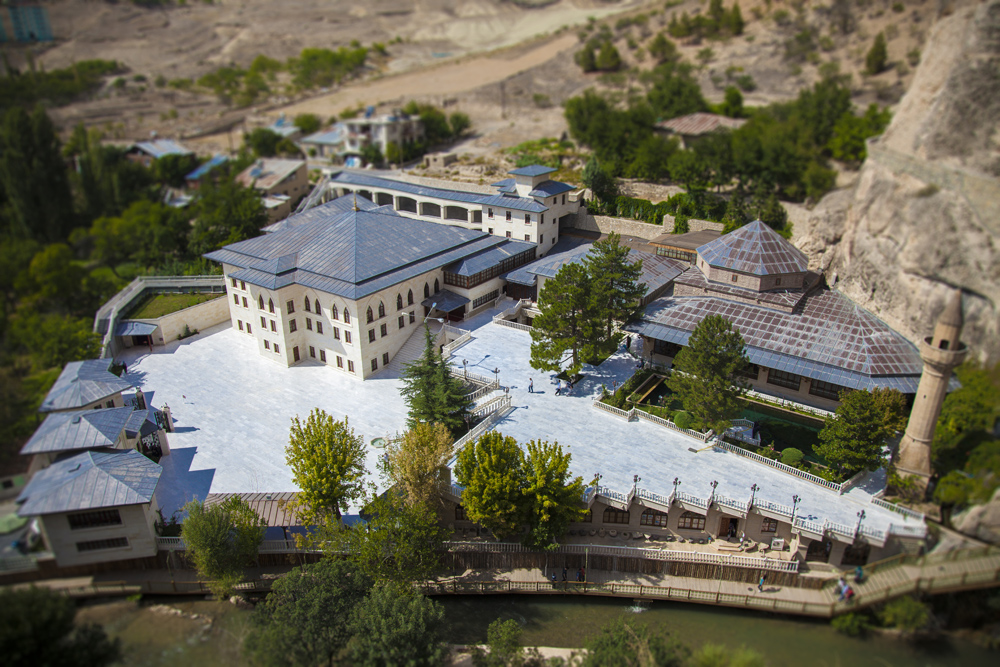
Somunju Baba Mosque

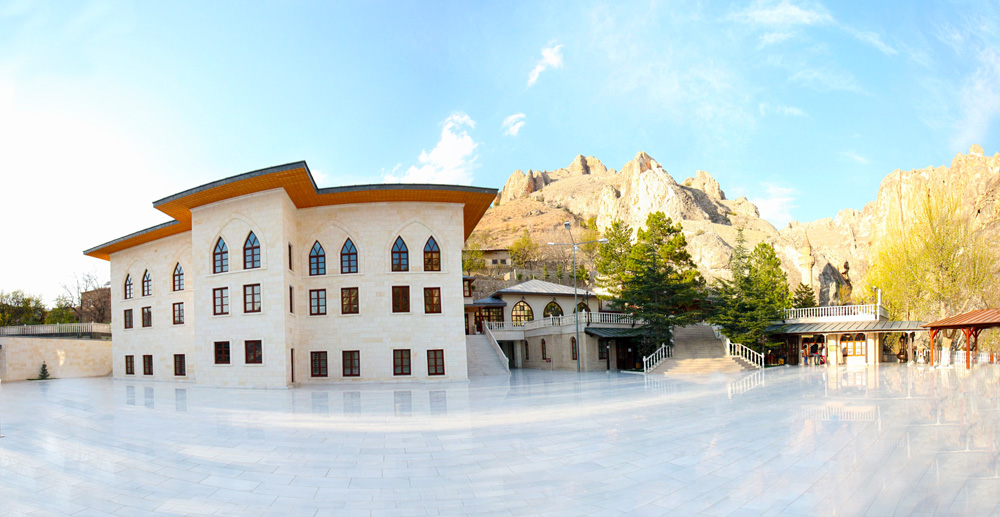
Somunju Baba Mosque

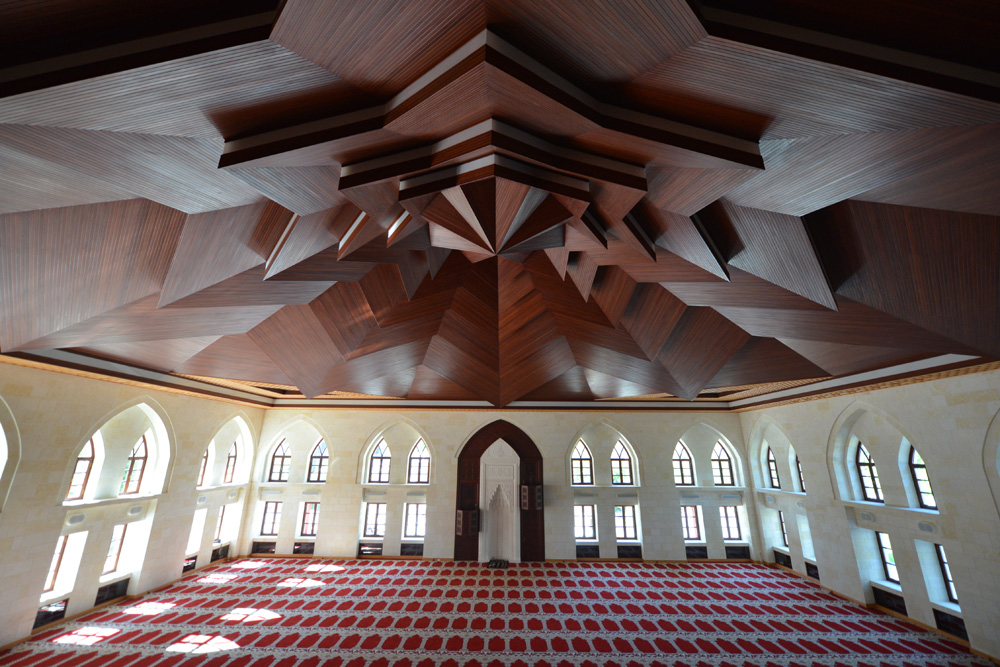
Somunju Baba Mosque

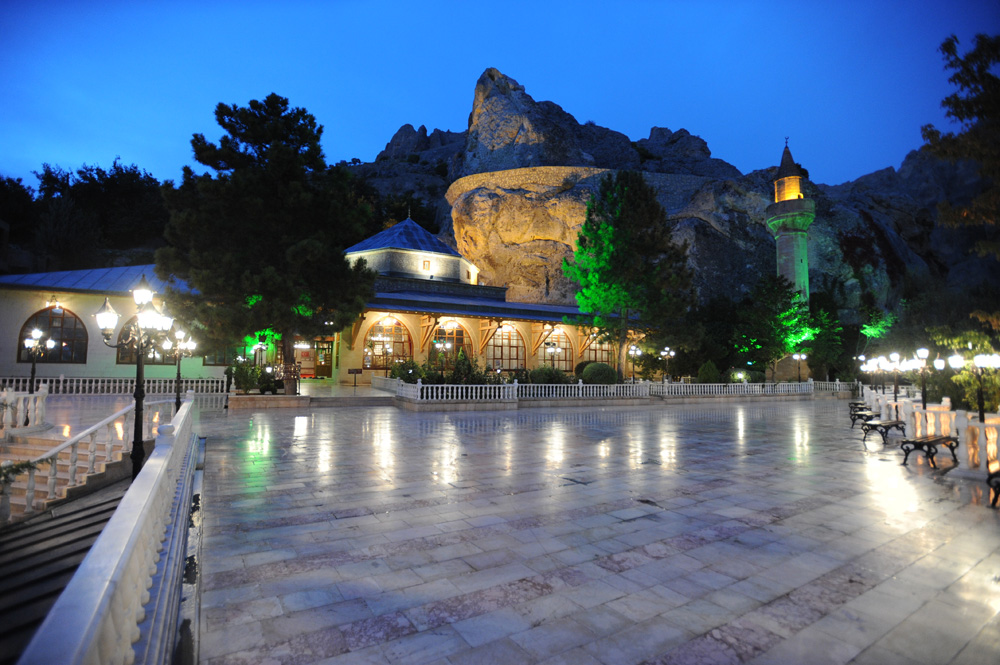
Somunju Baba Mosque
