= Üftade =

Ottoman scholar

Üftade, (b. 895 AH/1490 AD or 900 AH/1495 AD, Bursa - d. 988 AH/1580 AD, Bursa) was an Ottoman Islamic scholar, sufi poet, and the shaykh of Aziz Mahmud Hüdayi.

== Biography ==
Üftâde Hazretleri was born in the Araplar neighborhood of Bursa. Although his date of birth is given as 895 (1490) in the sources, it is understood that he was born around 900 (1495) from an expression in the Vâḳıʿât of his disciple (murid), Aziz Mahmud Hüdâyî. Üftade's name is Mehmed and his nickname is Muhyiddin. He is known by the pen name "Üftâde", which he used in his poems. It is recorded that his father came from Manyas and settled in Bursa.

Üftâde started his education with the encouragement of Muk'ad Hızır Dede, one of the Bayrami sheikhs he joined at a young age. He served him for about eight years until 918 (1512), when his sheikh died. He recited the call to prayer (azan) in the Bursa Grand Mosque and the Doğan Bey Masjid with his beautiful voice. He stopped calling the azan the day after he was warned in his dream, "You have fallen (üftâde) from your rank" because he accepted a salary of a few coins. After this incident, he made a living by making sericulture, buttons and copying books. At the same time, he continued his duties as an honorary imam and muezzin. He started preaching and teaching around the age of thirty-five. The public followed his sermons in Doğan Bey Masjid, Namazgah Mosque and other mosques with great interest. He was appointed as the orator of Emir Sultan Mosque between 1529 and 1536, while he was continuing his guidance activities in the mosque and tekke he had built in the Pınarbaşı Kuzgunluk neighborhood on the skirts of Mount Uludağ. He continued this duty, which Emir Sultan said he accepted with his spiritual sign, until 12 Jumad al-Awwal 988 (25 June 1580) when he died. His most famous caliph (successor), Aziz Mahmud Hüdâyî, joined him in the last years of his life in 984 (1576). His two sons, Mehmed and Mustafa, became sheikhs in his place in his dergah.

== Tasawwuf (Sufism) ==
Üftâde's tariqa chain reaches back to Haci Bayram-i Veli through Hızır Dede and Akbıyık Sultan. Although the Celvetiyye order is attributed to Aziz Mahmud Hüdâyî, it is Üftâde that takes the jalwah - mixing back with society following seclusion (khalwah) - as the basis in terms of the method of progress on the way. For this reason, it can be said that he was the sage of the Celvetiyye. As a matter of fact, Ismail Hakki Bursevi, a Celveti sheikh, states that the Celvetiyye was a crescent in the reign of Ibrahim Zâhid-i Geylani, a moon in the time of Üftâde, and a full moon in the time of Hüdâyî.

One of the most distinctive features of Üftâde is his asceticism and piety. In addition to avoiding the forbidden (haram), he did not even compliment some permissible (halal) things. Legend states that Sultan Suleiman the Magnificent once forbade Üftâde from mentioning Rumi’s Mesnevi and Ibn Arabi’s Fusus al-Hikam (The Seals of Wisdom) in his sermons, but when he invited Üftâde to Istanbul and offered to grant a couple of villages to his trust but Üftâde refused, Sultan Suleiman told his viziers that some sheikhs were seekers of worldly possessions (tâlib-i dunya) while Üftâde was a leaver of worldly possessions (târik-i dunya).

The essence of Üftâde's views on unveiling and gnosis is the phrase, "Even if all of the things in the material and spiritual (mulk wa malakut) realms appear to you through unveiling, if you are unable to explain it in accordance with the Sacred Law (shari'a), abandon that discovery, but do not abandon the shari'a." According to him, a seeker on the way watching the spiritual realm should not tell the affairs of that realm to someone who is in the material realm and is in line with the conditions of this realm, but the seeker on the way who discovers the Truth should sew his mouth with the needle and thread of the shari'a. If he speaks in public without putting his words in the sharia dress, it will cause mischief, as seen in the examples of Hallaj-i Mansur and Sayyid Nesimi, the sea of discord (fitnah) begins to fluctuate. In addition, they may cause those who utter these words by abstract imitation to fall into atheism. It is necessary to address people according to their level of understanding. As a matter of fact, the prophets did the same and spoke in accordance with people's capacity of mind. For this reason, not a single word came out of Üftâde's mouth in the form of a şathiye (humorous religious or sufi folk poems).

== Poetry ==
The poems of Üftâde, who wrote wise poems in a simple language in the style of Yunus Emre, attracted great attention in the circles of the tekke, some of which were composed and read in sufi chant (ilahi) form. The divan printed by Bursalı Mehmed Tahir (Istanbul 1328) has three more publications in the Latin alphabet (pub. Mustafa Bahadıroğlu, Celvetiyye'nin Piri Hz. Üftade ve Divanı, Bursa 1995; Üftâde Divanı, Bursa 2000, İstanbul 2011). Paul Ballanfat translated Üftâde's work, which consists of fifty poems mostly written in aruz and some in syllables, into French with the name Le divan Hazrat-i Pir Üftâde (Paris 2002). Angelo Culme-Seymour translated this into English as The Nightingale in the Garden of Love (Oxford 2005). Ali Örfî Efendi has commented on Üftâde's poetry in his work called Şerh-i Nutk-ı Üftâde, which begins with the lines "Again, the heart has fallen into love".

Aziz Mahmud Hüdâyî recorded the words of his master in Arabic during his three-year journey starting from the date of 1 Zu'l Qada 984 (20 January 1577) when he joined Üftâde until one month before his departure from Bursa, Friday, 9 Shawwal 987 (29 November 1579). The work he completed was known as Vâḳıʿât-ı Hüdâyî (Vâḳıʿât-ı Üftâde). The expression in the header means "Precious words of wrought gold conversed between the honorary sheikh and this poor person during the sulûk (progress on the way)". According to İsmâil Hakkı Bursevî, "The words of Sheikh Üftâde compiled by Hazrat Hüdâyi became popular as the Vâḳıʿât", this name was given to the work later. The author's copy of the book, which is considered to be the main source about Üftâde's views and the Celvetiyye order, is registered in Üsküdar Hacı Selim Ağa Library in two volumes of 100 leaves. Mehmed Muizzüddin Celveti, who is thought to be one of Hüdâyî's disciples, translated some parts of the work into Turkish while the sheikh was alive.

== Üftade Mosque and Tekke ==
Üftâde's dergah and mosque complex was completed in 985 (1577) in Yerkapı district of Bursa, and have survived to the present day with repairs and modifications made at various times. The latest restoration was conducted by the Bursa Municipality in the period 2009–2014.

== Notes ==
- Hüsâmeddin Bursevî, Menâkıb-ı Üftâde, Üftâde Tekkesi Ktp.
- Türbedar Şeyh İbrâhim Efendi, Menâkıb-ı Pîr Üftâde, Üftâde Tekkesi Ktp.
- Menâkıb-ı Şeyh Üftâde, Üftâde Tekkesi Ktp.
- Mecdî, Şekāik Tercümesi, s. 377.
- Hulvî, Lemezât-ı Hulviyye, Millet Ktp., Ali Emîrî, Şer‘iyye, nr. 1100, vr. 203b.
- İsmâil Hakkı Bursevî, Silsile-i Celvetiyye, İstanbul 1291, s. 44, 63, 77–80.
- Belîğ, Güldeste, s. 107–109.
- Müstakimzâde Süleyman Sâdeddin, Risâle-i Melâmiyye-i Şettâriyye, İÜ Ktp., İbnülemin, nr. 3357, vr. 5a-6a.
- Harîrîzâde, Tibyân, II, vr. 227a vd.
- Osmanlı Müellifleri, I, 12, 22, 134.
- Hüseyin Vassâf, Sefîne-i Evliyâ (haz. Mehmet Akkuş – Ali Yılmaz), İstanbul 2006, II, 576–584.
- M. Fuad Köprülü, Türk Edebiyatında İlk Mutasavvıflar (haz. Orhan F. Köprülü), Ankara 1966, s. 269.
- Mehmed Şemseddin [Ulusoy], Bursa Dergâhları: Yâdigâr-ı Şemsî (haz. Mustafa Kara – Kadir Atlansoy), Bursa 1997, s. 370.
- Kepecioğlu, Bursa Kütüğü, I, 106; II, 281; III, 248, 396; IV, 281.
- Irene Beldiceanu-Steinherr, Scheich Üftâde der Begründer des Ğelvetijje Ordens, München 1961.
- Hasan Kâmil Yılmaz, Azîz Mahmûd Hüdâyî ve Celvetiyye Tarîkatı, İstanbul 1980, s. 125, 235, 244, 247, 272.
- Mustafa Bahadıroğlu, Celvetiye’nin Pîri Hz. Üftâde ve Divan’ı, Bursa 1995.
- a.mlf., Vâkıât’ın Tahlîl ve Tahkîki (doktora tezi, 2003), UÜ Sosyal Bilimler Enstitüsü.
