= Emine Işınsu =

Turkish writer, poet, and journalist (1938–2021)

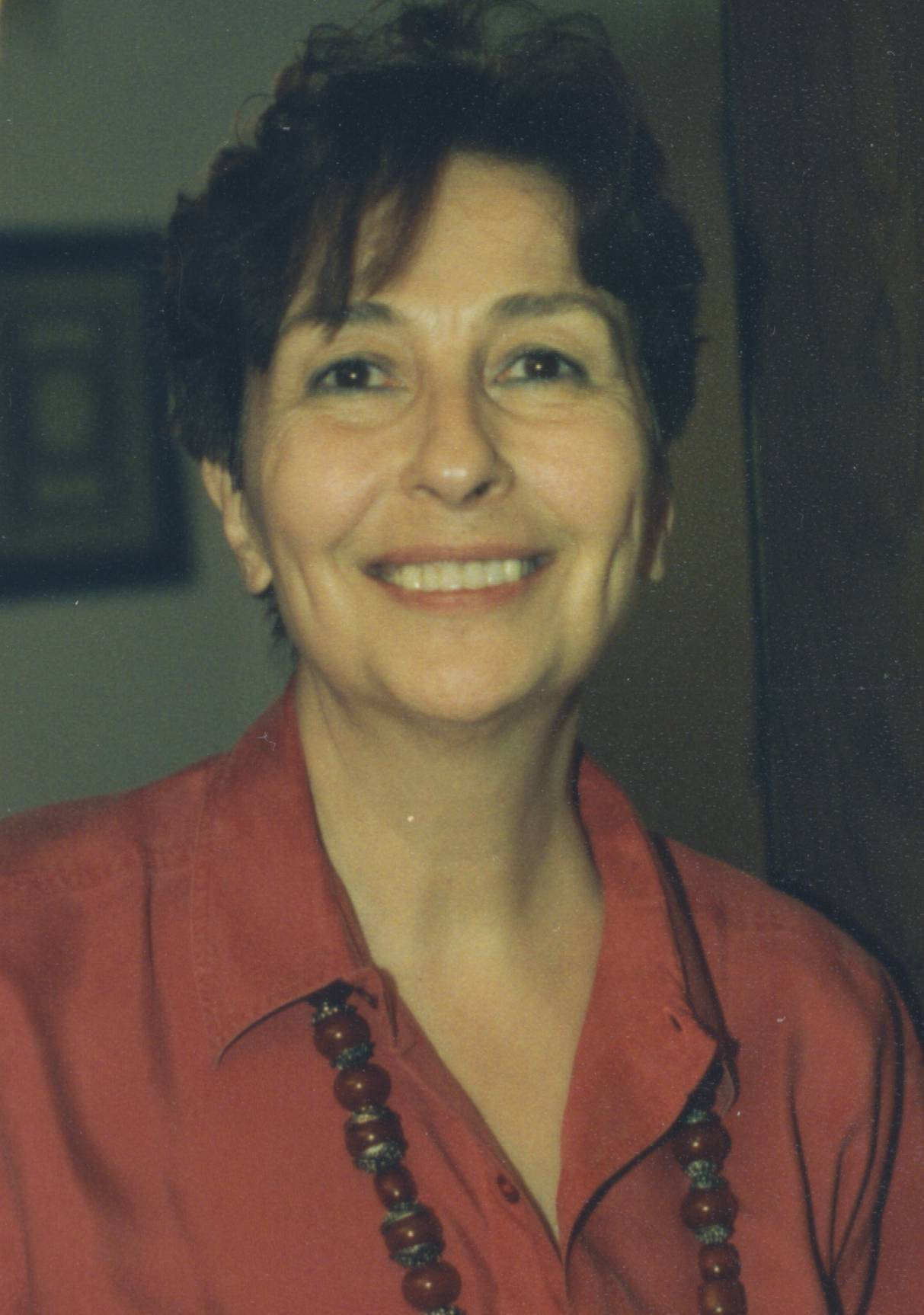
- Born: 17 May 1938; Kars, Turkey
- Died: 5 May 2021 (aged 82); Ankara
- Education: TED Ankara College, Ankara University, Middle East Technical University
- Occupations: Journalist, writer, poet
- Spouse: İskender Öksüz
- Children: 3
- Writing career
- Years active: 1955-2008

Emine Işınsu Öksüz (17 May 1938 – 5 May 2021) was a Turkish writer, poet, and journalist.

== Life ==
Işınsu was born on May 17, 1938, in Kars, where her father served as the Division Commander. She grew up in an environment where her mother was constantly talking about literature and poetry was read, and because of her father's duties, she lived for a few years in various parts of the country such as Sarıkamış, Urfa, and Karaman. The schools she grew up in reflect these frequent relocations. She attended primary school in Urfa, Sarıkamış and Ankara. The school from which she graduated from high school is TED Ankara College. She was in the United States for one semester as an AFS scholar. She studied for a while at Ankara University, Faculty of Language, History and Geography, English Language and Literature, Philosophy departments of the same faculty, and Middle East Technical University, Department of Business Administration. While studying English Language and Literature, she went to the United States with an AFS scholarship for one semester. Her first work is a poetry book, İki Nokta, which was published when she was 17 years old. After the award-winning Small World in 1963, she focused heavily on the novel. Apart from writing novels, she published Töre Magazine, one of the important intellectual and art periodicals of the 1970s, between 1971-1981. Her articles were published in many magazines and newspapers; She worked as a columnist in Yeni İstanbul and Sabah newspapers. Işınsu, who was married to the writer İskender Öksüz, was the mother of three children. Isinsu, who has been struggling with Alzheimer's disease since 2008, died on May 5, 2021, at the age of 82. Her body was buried in Ankara Gölbaşı Cemetery after the funeral ceremony held at the Hacı Bayram Mosque the next day.

== Literary identity ==
In Işınsu's novels, human psychology comes to the fore more than place descriptions. In her first novel, Küçük Dünya, which was written in the first person singular narration, everything is conveyed by filtering the mood of the protagonist. Although the first person singular is abandoned in her other novels, we still see the events and places after passing through the emotional filter of the heroes and with their perceptions. This psychological weight sometimes resembles a stream of consciousness. Among the novel subjects, the captivity of women, the captivity of the Turks (Bulgaria, Kirkuk, Western Thrace), Turkey's pains come to the fore. In her recent works, the lives of Yunus Emre, Niyazi Mısri, Hacı Bayram Veli and Hacı Bektaş Veli, the peaks of Turkish mysticism, are discussed.

== Awards ==
- "Small World" and T. C. Ministry of Tourism Art Gift
- Turkish Literature Foundation Novel Award with "Ak Topraklar"
- First place in the drama category at the Radiophonic Play Competition of the Turkish Radio and Television Corporation with the play "One Heart Sold".
- Turkish National Culture Foundation Novel Award with "Pain"
- Turkish Writers Union Novel Award with "Canbaz"
- Turkish Hearths Hamdullah Suphi Tanrıöver Gift
- Karaman Turkish Language Awards, “Author Award for Correct and Beautiful Use of Turkish”
- İLESAM (Turkish Scientific and Literary Work Owners Professional Association), “Honorary Award”
- Writers Union of Turkey - Istanbul Branch, “Lifetime Novel Award”

== Memberships ==
- Member of the Board of Trustees of the Turkish Literature Foundation
- Member of the Central Union of Owners of Science and Literature (İLESAM)
- Member of the Writers' Union of Turkey

== Works ==
=== Novels ===
- Küçük Dünya (1966) ISBN 975-437-059-1
- Azap Toprakları (1970) ISBN 975-8971-39-5
- Ak Topraklar (1971) ISBN 975-8971-46-8
- Tutsak (1973) ISBN 975-8971-37-9
- Sancı (1974) ISBN 975-437-044-3
- Çiçekler Büyür (1978) ISBN 975-437-060-5
- Canbaz (1982) ISBN 975-437-078-8
- Kaf Dağı’nın Ardında (1988) ISBN 975-437-066-4
- Alpaslan (1990) ISBN 975-422-172-3
- Atlı Karınca (1990) ISBN 975-8971-48-4
- Un coeur aux encheres (1991) ISBN 975-17-0890-7
- Cumhuriyet Türküsü (1993) ISBN 975-8971-42-5
- Nisan Yağmuru (1997) ISBN 975-437-201-2
- Havva (1999) ISBN 975-437-255-1
- Bir Ben Vardır Bende Benden İçeri (2002) ISBN 975-8971-44-1
- Bukağı (2004) ISBN 975-437-472-4
- Hacı Bayram (2005) ISBN 978-975-8971-44-2
- Hacı Bektaş Veli (2008) ISBN 978-605-5261-15-3
- Bir Aile (2013) ISBN 978-605-5261-49-8

Küçük Dünya was filmed as a television series by Director Osman Sinav and broadcast on TRT. Atli Karinca is an original screenplay shot as a television series by Director Osman Sinav. However, it was published in the form of a novel after TRT banned its broadcasting on the grounds that it was "mocking the intellectuals".

=== Plays ===
- Bir Yürek Satıldı (1967)
- Bir Milyon İğne (1967)
- Adsız Kahramanlar (1975)

Broadcast as a radiophonic play on TRT, Bir Yürek Satıldı was later filmed as a television series and was broadcast on TRT again.

=== Other ===
- Dost Diye Diye (essay-1995)
- Bir Gece Yıldızlarla (stories-1991)
