= Osman Fazli =

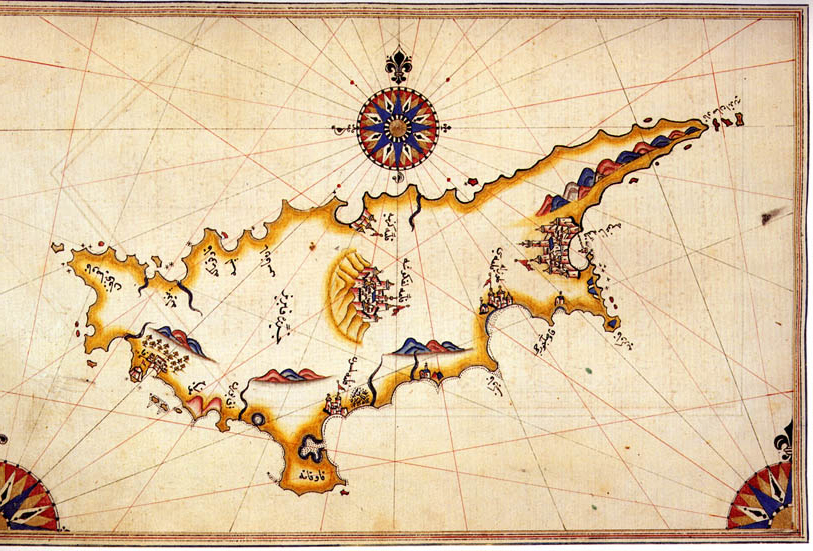
- Osman Fazli's tomb is at Famagusta, Cyprus

Personal life
- Born: 7 July 1632 Shumnu, today Bulgaria
- Died: 1691 (aged 58–59) Famagusta, Cyprus
- Resting place: Famagusta, Cyprus
- Main interest(s): Mysticism, Theology
- Notable work(s): Commentaries on Ibn Arabi and Sadreddîn Konevî
- Other names: Atpazarî Osman Fazlı-Allah, Kutup Osman Fazlı
- Occupation: Sheikh, Author,

Religious life
- Religion: Islam
- Jurisprudence: Sunni
- Tariqa: Jelveti
- Movement: Sufism

Muslim leader
- Influenced by: Muhammad, Ibn 'Arabi, Sadreddîn Konevî, Mahmud Hudayi, Muk'ad Ahmed, Mes’ud Çelebi, Zakirzade Abdullah,.
- Influenced: Ismail Hakki Bursevi

Osman Fazli (Turkish: Atpazarı Osman Fazlı-ilahi or Kutb Osman Fazlı), was a Jelveti Sufi spiritual guide in 17th-century Ottoman Empire. He spent c.25 years teaching and preaching, and became head Sheikh of the order in Istanbul and led the studies, conversation, meditation, and dhikr. But when he was about 48 it was revealed to him that the Ottoman Empire would fall into ruin, and, although he was of reclusive temperament, felt the only way to care for its population was to be at the Sultan's court. There he was outspoken against many of the Grand Vizier's plans: that they would bring disaster and misfortune, and he was proven right. He spent some years at court but when he declared one Grand Vizier's plan as against the sharia and distorting the Quran, the only way the Vizier could silence him was with exile. Osman Fazli went into retreat but emerged with a different course of action: he was leading a band of Sufis towards the battlefront when he was arrested and exiled for good. Osman Fazli exemplifies the Jelveti way: that following union with Allah he returns and acts in the world. He is hushyar (awake).

== Education ==
Osman Fazli was born 7 July 1632 (19 Zilhicce 1040 A.H) in Shumnu, today Shumen in present-day north east Bulgaria but then part of the Ottoman Empire. Osman Fazli's father, Seyyid Fethullah, was a learned person of very severe temperament and educated Osman Fazli himself, however he died when Osman was about ten and the boy ceased studies for a while. But when he heard an itinerant poet praising the value of spiritual knowledge, he was inspired to take up such studies and moved first to Edirne in Thrace to the classes of Jelveti Saçlı Ibrahim. He was next sent to the main Jelveti tekke in Uskudar, Istanbul whose principal Jelveti Saçlı Ibrahim, a holy ecstatic (meczup), had appointed one of his pupils, Zakirzade Abdullah Efendi, as the spiritual guide to seekers. Osman, on meeting Zakirzade, cried: "Now I have found my sheykh." Zakirzade Abdullah, now an old man, replied: "At last a student with real certainty in God has come to us. For so many years we have performed this service here without coming across such strength of spirit as this," later adding that Osman had the natural ‘mashrab’ (way of drinking) of Sheykh al Akbar Muhyiddin Ibn ‘Arabi. Because Osman Fazlı exemplified the way of service, all the knowledges were inspired into his heart.

== Preaching ==
Sheikh Zakirzade then sent him to preach, and call to God, the people of Aydos near Edirne. About 1656 Ismail Hakkı was brought before him and he thereafter referred to him as "our student since the age of three".

After 1657 Osman Fazlı received an indication to move north west to Plovdiv (Filibe) on the road to Sofia. There he gave spiritual direction for fifteen years.

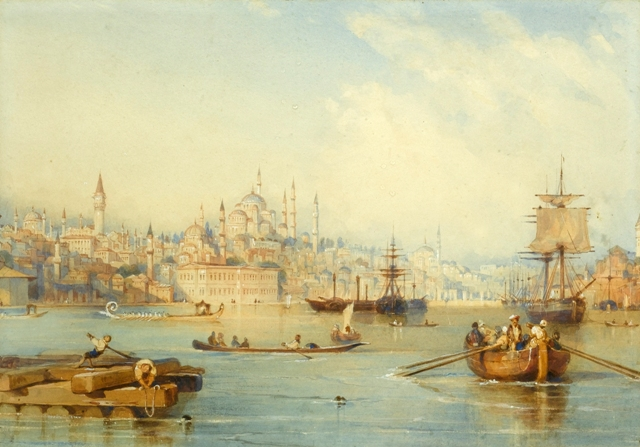
Ottoman era Istanbul

Ca.1672 a vision directed him to move to the Kul Cami a very small mosque near the At Pazarı (horse market), Fatih district, Istanbul. He found a room nearby and was soon given the post of preacher and imam. Here he took up the private study of Ibn Arabi's works. Within a few years he was giving daily sermons at the Kul Camii, preaching at the Yavuz Selim Mosque on Fridays and preaching at the Süleymaniye Mosque on Wednesdays.

By 1673, age 41, Ozman Fazli had become leader of the Jelveti sect in Istanbul, a Sufi order known for its emphasis on khalwa (retreat) and individualism. where he guided Muraqaba (meditation) and led the Dhikr. He also gave public classes and his fame as a Murshid (guide) brought students flocking from all over the Empire including, in 1673, young Ismail Hakki who later became Ismail Hakki Bursevi, his heir.

== Political matters ==
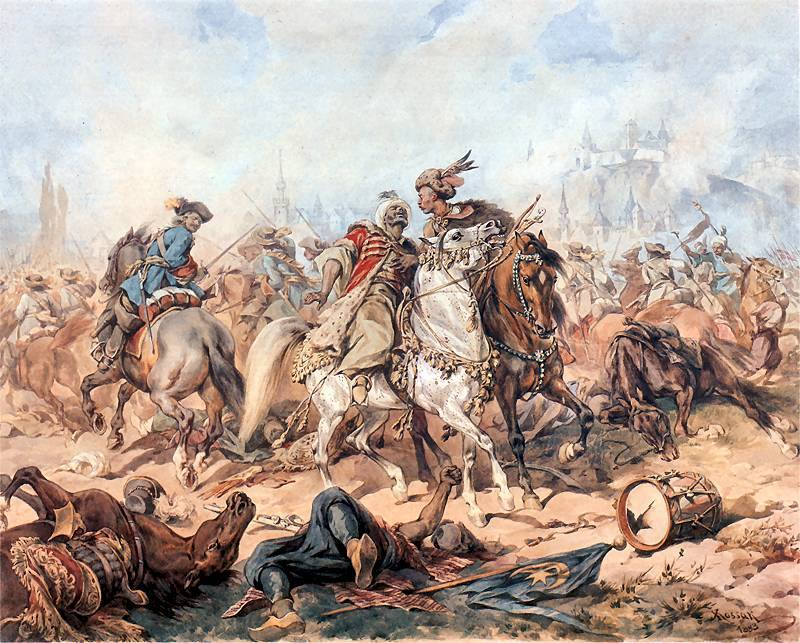
In 1683 the Ottoman Empire entered the long and disastrous Great Turkish War

Aged c.48 Osman Fazlı had a vision of the fall of the Ottoman Empire and although he was of reclusive temperament and had no inclination for public office, felt destined to step into politics to influence world events. In Islam, those who have union with God are saints (Wali), but there are two kinds: One kind remains "annihilated", "drunk with God" (mestanan), the other kind returns to function in this world and is "The Awake" (hushyar); and that is the Jelveti way that Osman Fazli followed.

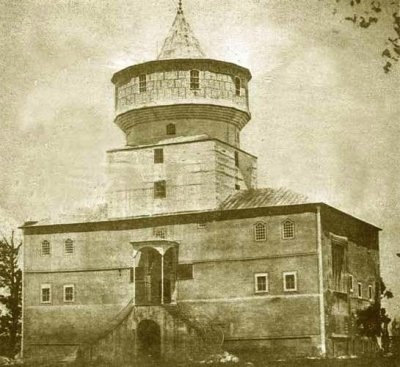
The Imperial Throne Pavilion, one of 72 buildings at Edirne Palace

Osman Fazlı stopped teaching and moved to Edirne to enter the court at the Sultan's palace. There, he was most outspoken: he gave frank criticisms of every selfish policy that did not benefit the population. That pleased Sultan Mehmet IV however, in that empire's structure, it was the Grand Vizier who held the power) and authority. In 1682 Grand Vizier Kara Mustafa Pasha decided to break the treaty between the Ottoman empire and the Holy Roman Empire by invading Vienna, Osman Fazli strongly argued against it, claiming it could only lead to disaster and misfortune. And he was proved right in his predictions. For in 1683 the Ottoman Empire was subject to the long and disastrous Great Turkish War. After the execution of the Grand Vizier other pashas were appointed to that post in rapid sequence.

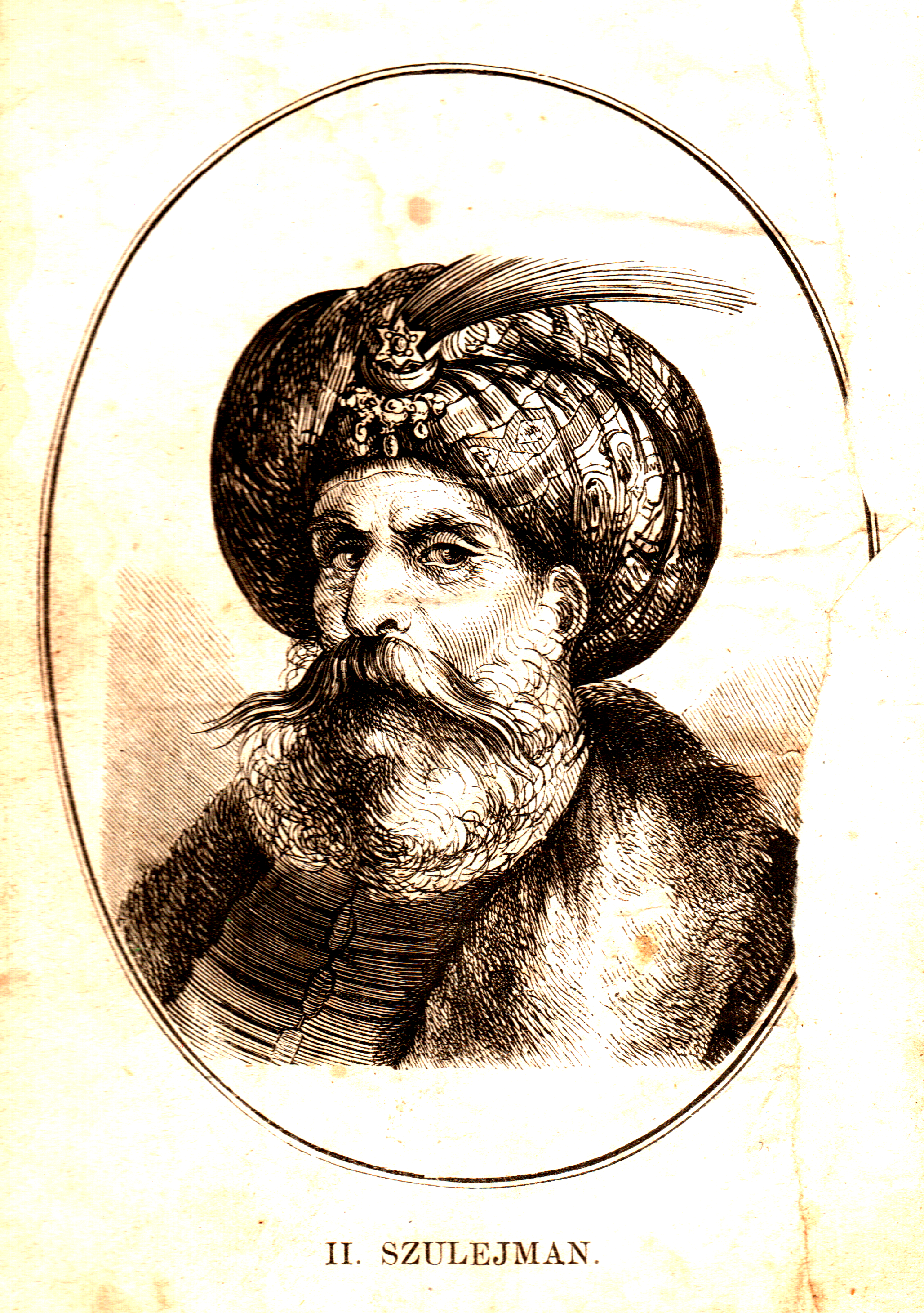
In 1687, armed mutineers placed Suleiman II on the throne

In 1687 a rebellion dethroned Mehmet IV in favour of his yet more ineffective brother Suleyman II. In 1688, Janissaries took over Istanbul and the citizens marched on the Topkapı Palace in protest. The sultan pleaded Osman Fazlı to help and he went out bearing aloft the Sancak-i Şerif, the Standard of the Prophet and appealed to their religious sentiment, gained their support, and the rebellion was contained. The sultan then called on Osman Fazlı to take over the Grand Viziership, but he declined.

The Vizierate financed their constant warfare by requisitioning peoples property, and in 1689 Grand Vizier Köprülü Fazıl Mustafa Pasha asked Osman Fazlı and the scholars to find a formula in Koranic law to support this. When Osman Fazlı warned him that it was against the spirit of the Sheriat, and only misfortune come upon those who ‘abused their position by distorting the Holy Law’

The Grand Vizier retorted by banishing him, in an effort to silence him, to Shumnu for three months. And when he returned he did try to keep out of politics and went on retreat in Rumeli Hisar, a village a few miles up the Bosphorus. But he again felt he must proclaim that the requisitions were not legal, and must be opposed, and was leading a band of Sufis towards the battlefront when he was arrested and in 1690 the Grand Vizier exiled him to Cyprus.

== Shrine ==
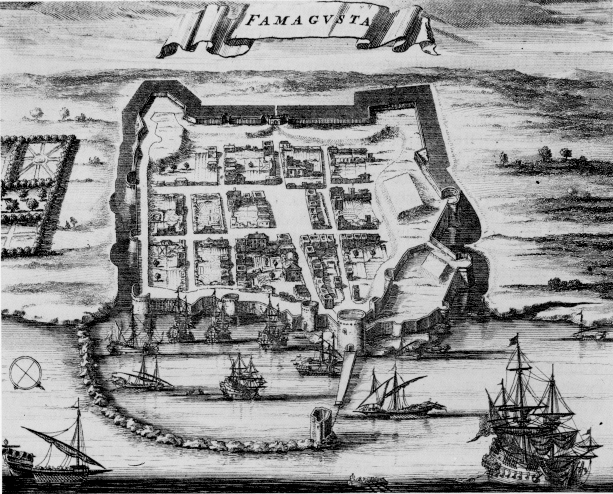
Osman Fazli's shrine is just outside the old city walls of Famagusta; in this illustration, near the top left corner.

In 1690 was taken to Famagusta, north east Cyprus. There, all he ate was a piece of bread every evening. He requested his pupil Ismail Hakki come from Bursa: "There is really nothing left behind apart from our wujud (existence) ... For eternal life there is no need to remain in the world." He always disliked fame and renown: "Don’t erect a türbe over me; a stone to mark the head of the grave will be enough to provide the opportunity for a prayer." His last request was to be buried in the open countryside around Üsküdar, Istanbul, but his exile did not permit it, so he was buried in the martyrs’ cemetery, Famagusta where it was eventually lost. However, Seyyid Mehmet Aga, of the Celvetiye brotherhood, found his tomb and built a formal mausoleum and tekke. Over the centuries, it fell into disrepair, however, it was rebuilt in 1824 and today, beside a masjid, his sarcophagus lies in a simple room.

In Cyprus he is revered by the name Kutup Osman Fazli, meaning he was the spiritual axis of worldly matters.

== Teachings ==
- "Man possesses three languages; The first is the normal speech which we use to communicate verbally between each other. The second is the language of the soul, which expresses itself … when the feelings are stirred … as fast as a flash of lightning. It does not appear in words but depends for its expression on events and circumstances. The third speech comes under the order of eternal matters. It is the manifestation of the path or the inherent mission in each being, in Man, as well as in animals and plants."
- "Man does not possess anything else but his sensibilities as his real organ of intelligence, and without Divine action cannot even use his memory which is his sacred treasury of experience acquired long ago. The initiate, the saint, the Al-Insān al-Kāmil, is he who possesses the faculty of being able to recognise the true non-existence of his faculties of thought, and his own impotence in putting them in motion. It is he who leaves all the ‘space’ to God and who passes all his life in controlling his intimate faithfulness, in actions, ‘thought’ or in the acts that materialise them. It is he who prays constantly to God, even if it be only by a breath or by a movement of the heart, when he perceives the natural and constant phenomena of thought… The intimate work of the mystic in trying to attain the Divine proximity consists in responding to His infinite clemency by his recognition, or through Zikr, whenever thoughts ‘visitors from heaven’, manifest in his interior. Good or tempting, these visitors have for mission the exercising of our discernment to the most subtle degree of ‘Good and Evil', whereby we accord them our consent or we refuse them.
- "According to the Koran, Man is the witness of Creation. The human soul is then, for the mystic, a constant miracle from God, and the acquired worth of the soul is determined by the swiftness of its response in praise and gratitude, which forms the foundation of its conduct and the conscientious awareness of its vision. The soul is educated and enlightened by the growing discrimination between good and evil and by our action to keep it on the straight path, in order to please only God."

== Publications ==
Some of the works written by the master are:

- Misbâh-ul-Kulûb (Perceiving the Heart), a commentary on Sadr al-Din al-Qunawi's Miftâh-ul-Gayb’ının şerhidir (Lamp of the Unseen)
- Mir’ât-ı Esrâr-il-İrfân (Shroud of Secret Understandings), a commentary on Sadreddîn Konevî's explanation of the Fâtiha
- Tecelliyât-ı Berkiyye (Manifestations of Lightning), a commentary on Muhyiddîn Ibn Arabi's Işkiyye’dir Kasîde-i Işkiyye’nin şerhidir (Ode to Ecstatic Flashes of Lightning of Love for God)
- Hâşiye-i Şerh-i Füsûs-ül-Hikem (Commentary and footnotes on the Bezels of Wisdom), a commentary on Ibn Arabi's Fuṣūṣ al-Ḥikam
- Tenkih Şerhi (Commentary on Marriage)
- Telvih Hâşiyesi (Changing Colors Clearly Explained)
- Risâle-i İmâm Hâşiyesi (Booklet for the Chief Leader of Prayers)
- Hanefiyye Şerhi (Commentary on the Man of Blessed Knowledge)
- Hidâyet-ül-Mutehayyirîn (Guidance for the Astonished)
- Mutavvel Hâşiyesi (Augmentation Clearly Explained)
- Feth-ul-Bâb (The Superior Gateway)
- Risâlet-ür Rahmâniyye (Booklet on the Most Merciful)

== Gallery ==
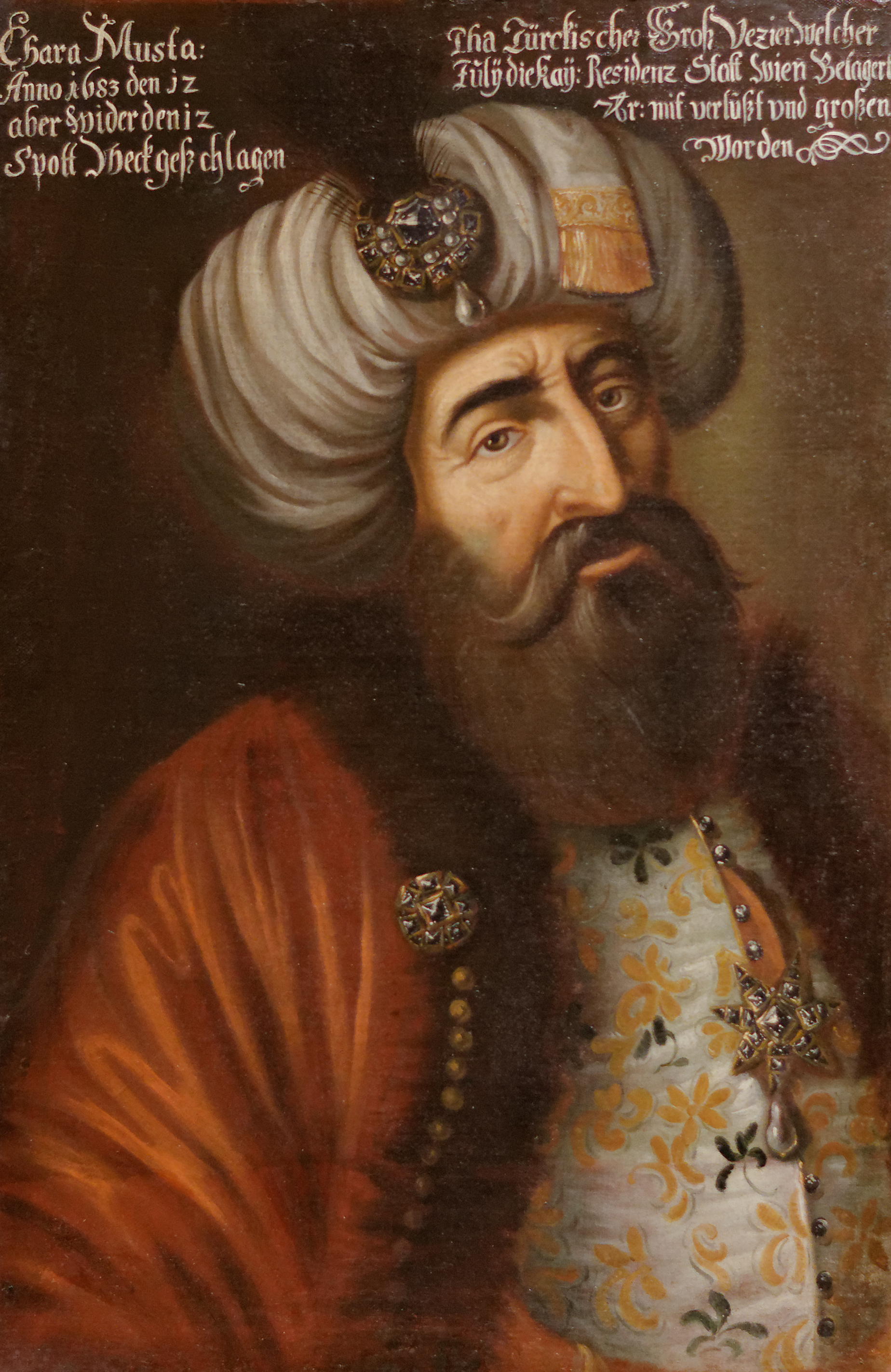
Kara Mustafa Pasha, Grand Vizier 1676-1683, broke the treaty with the Holy Roman Empire.

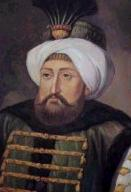
Mehmed IV was Sultan 1648-1687, overthrown by soldiers disenchanted by the ongoing Wars

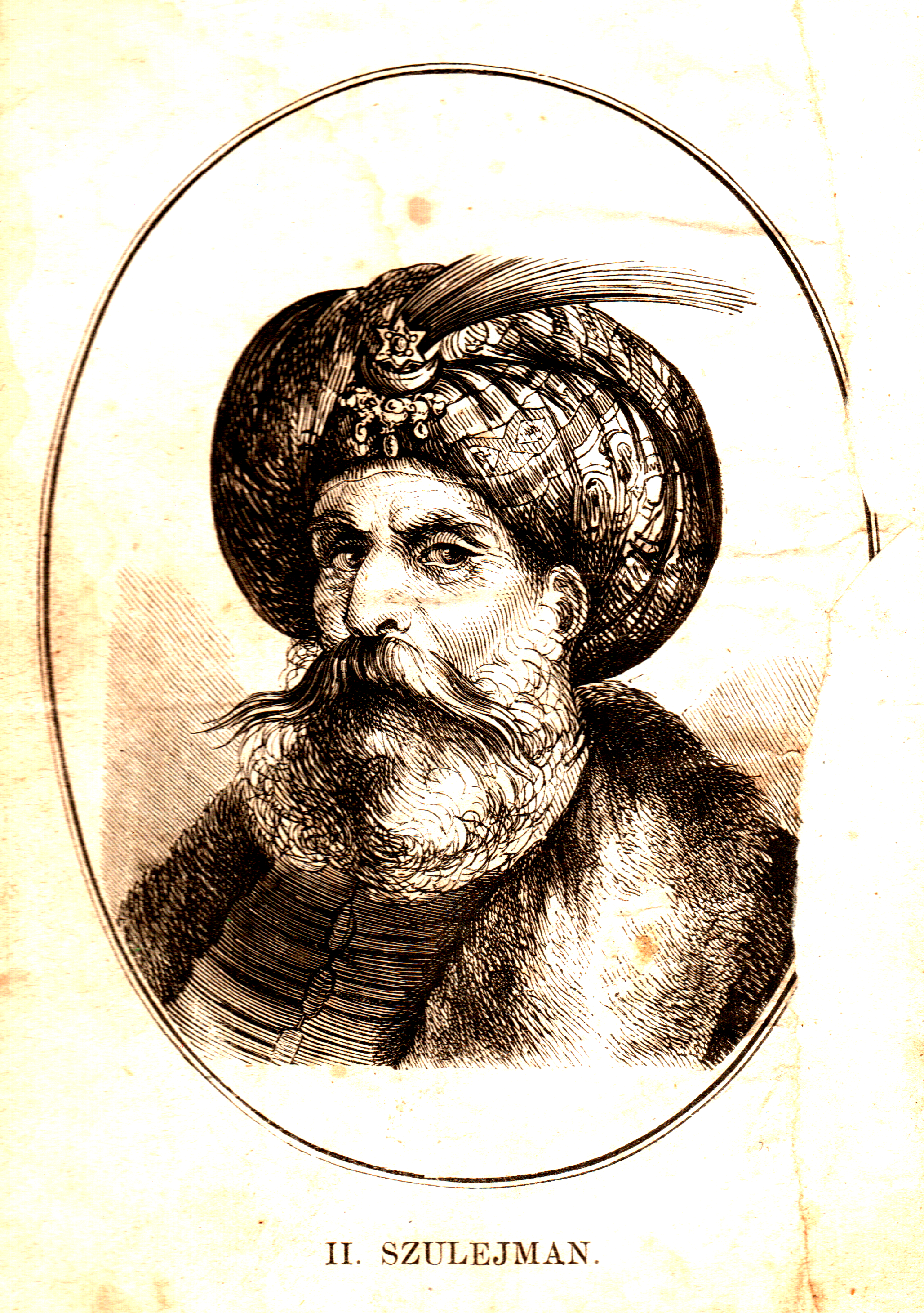
Suleiman II - brought to the throne by armed mutiny - was Sultan 1687-1691
