= Ismail Haqqi Bursevi =

Ottoman Sufi scholar (1653–1725)

Ismail Hakki Bursevi
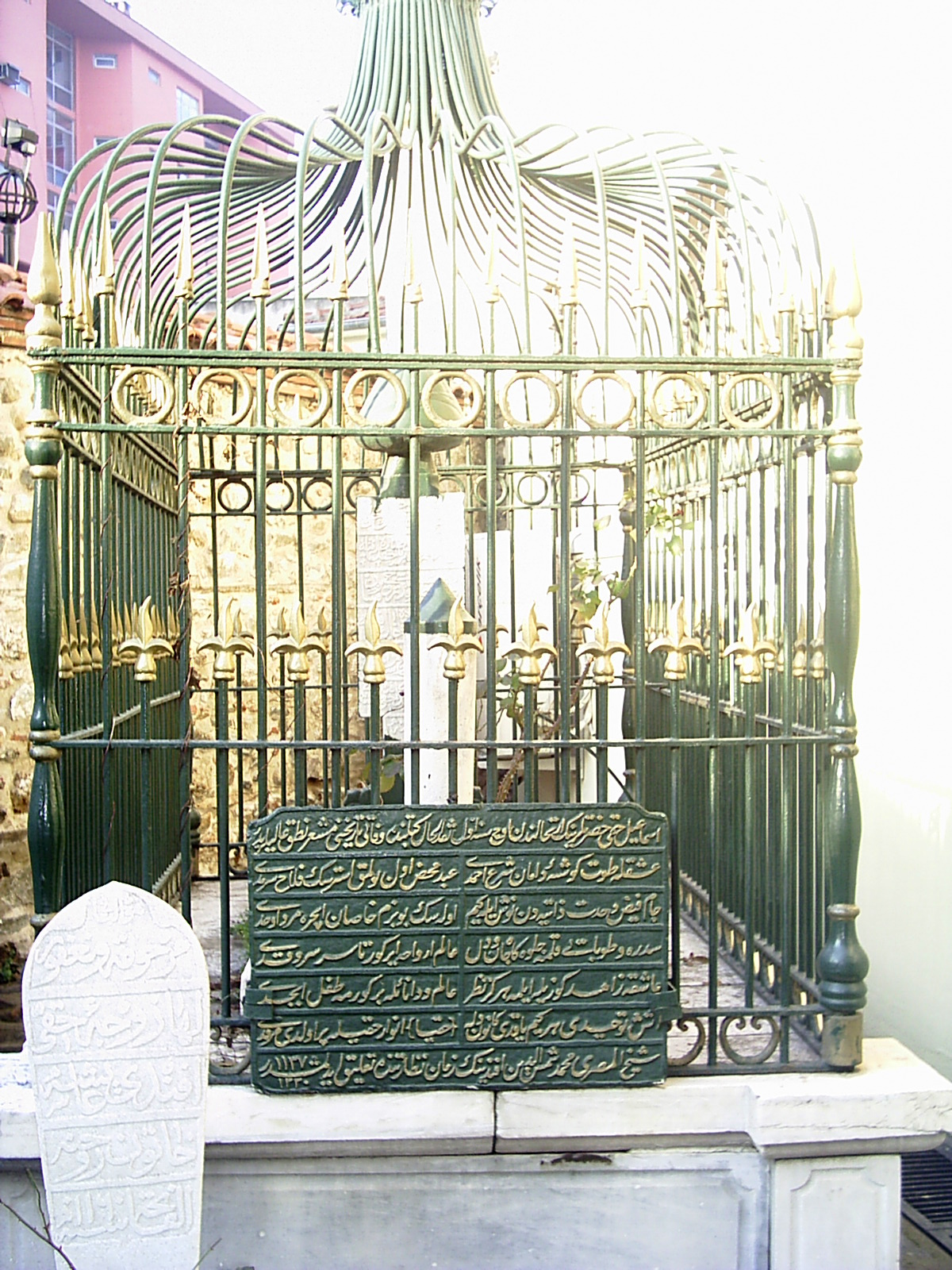
- İsmail Hakkı Bursevî's Tomb in Bursa

Personal life
- Born: 1653 Aytos, Ottoman Empire, now Bulgaria
- Died: 1725 (aged 71–72) Bursa, Anatolia, Turkey
- Resting place: Bursa Turkey
- Main interest(s): Theology, ethics, mysticism
- Notable idea: Translating Arabic books into Turkish
- Notable work(s): Commentaries of the Koran, Ibn Arabi, Rumi, Attar, Najmuddin Kubra
- Other name: İsmail Hakkı Üsküdari
- Occupation: Author, translator, sheikh, musical composition, poet

Religious life
- Religion: Islam
- Jurisprudence: Sunni
- Tariqa: Jelveti
- Movement: Sufism

Muslim leader
- Influenced by: Muhammad, Abd-al-Baqi al-Zurqani, Osman Fazli, Jami, Rumi, Mahmud Hudayi, Ibn Arabi, Attar of Nishapur, Najm al-Din Kubra
- Influenced: Sultan Mehmet IV, Sultan Mustafa II, Grand Vizier Elmas Mehmed Pasha

İsmail Hakkı Bursevî (Bursalı İsmail Hakkı)
- Born: 1653; Aytos, Ottoman Empire
- Died: 1725 (aged 71–72) Bursa, Ottoman Empire
- Genres: Ottoman classical music, Turkish makam
- Occupations: Lyrics author, composer

İsmail Hakkı Bursevî (Turkish: Bursalı İsmail Hakkı, Arabic: إسماعيل حقي البروسوي, Persian: Esmā’īl Ḥaqqī Borsavī) was a 17th-century Ottoman Turkish Muslim scholar, a Jelveti Sufi author, best known for his masterwork Tafsir Ruh al-Bayan on mystical experience and the esoteric interpretation of the Quran; also a poet and musical composer. İsmail Hakkı Bursevî influenced many parts the Ottoman Empire but primarily Turkey. To this day he is revered as one of the Büyükler, the great saints of Anatolia.

He is regarded as an eminent literary figure in the Turkish language, having authored more than a hundred works. Translations of some of his works are now available for the English-speaking world.

== Life ==
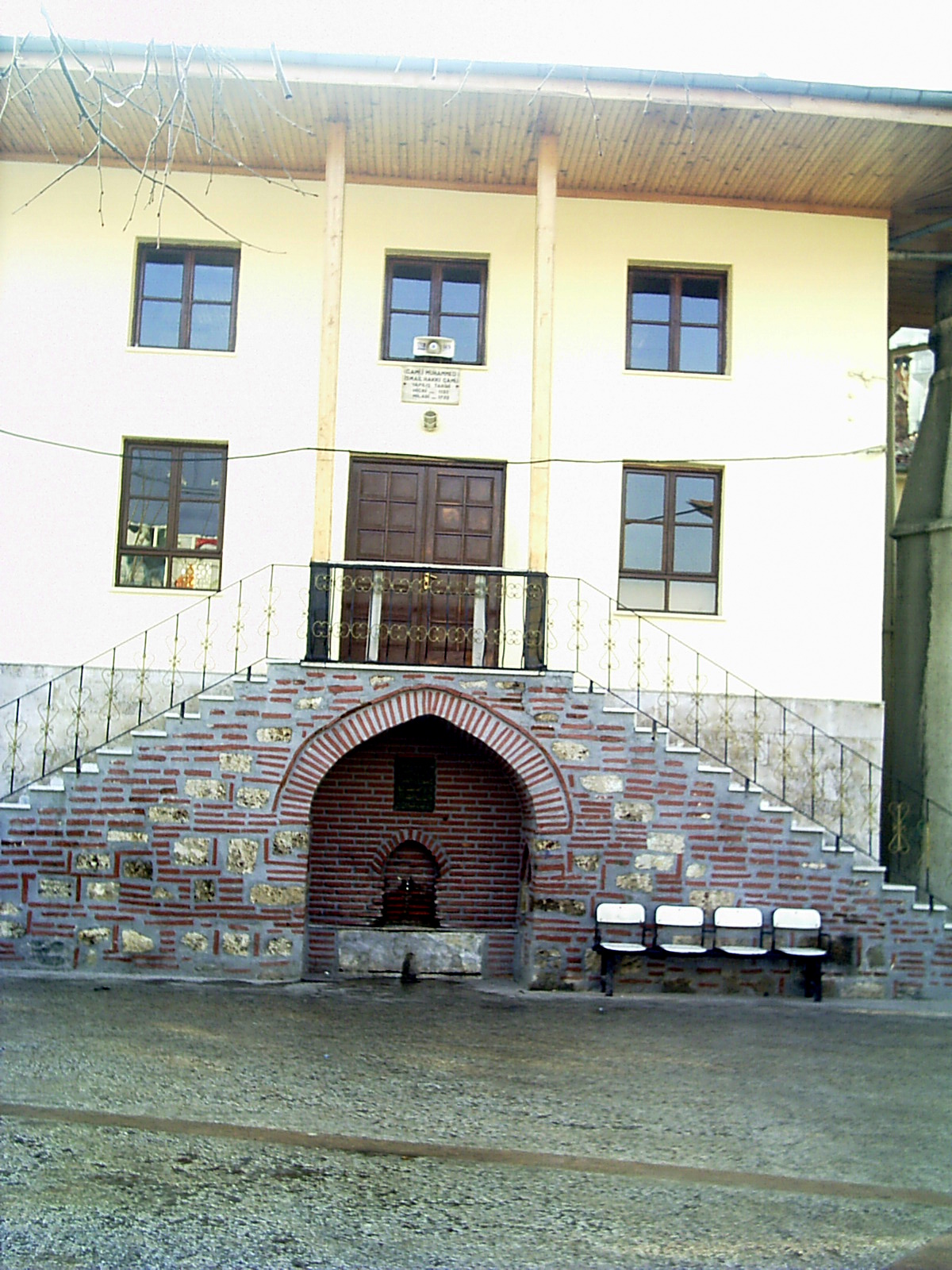
Ismail Hakki left all his money for the construction of this mosque at İsmail Hakkı Kuran Kursu, Bursa, Turkey

İsmail Hakkı was the son of Muṣṭafā, who was in turn son of Bayram Čawush, who was in turn son of Shah Ḵhudā-bende. İsmail Hakkı was born in 1652 or 1653 in Aytos, Thrace, although his parents came from Aksaray, Istanbul. His mother died when he was aged seven and on the suggestion of Shaykh Osman Fazli around 1663 he was sent to Edirne (Adrinaople), to receive a traditional education under the scholar ʿAbd-al-Baki, a relative of the Shaykh.

In 1673, aged 21, he went to Istanbul to the public classes of Osman Fazli, the head Sheykh of the Jelveti (Djilwatiyya) order, who initiated him into that discipline. İsmail Hakkı also attended the lectures of other scholars, and learnt Persian to study Attar, Rumi, Ḥāfiẓ and Jami. He also studied Islamic calligraphy and music and set to music many hymns of the 17th century mystic Hudāyī, founder of the Jelveti order.

In 1675, age 23, Osman Fazli sent him, with three assistant dervishes, to Skopje (Üsküb), Macedonia, to establish a ṭarīqah (a monastery) for teaching Jelveti philosophy. Some welcomed them and İsmail Hakkı married the daughter of Sheikh Muṣṭafā ʿUshshāḳī. Encouraged by his master's letters he wrote his most brilliant sermons. However he offended the townsfolk by overly-berating them for what he considered loose behaviour. Despite Osman Fazli explaining to him that censure was not the Jelveti way he did not rein in his zeal and his antagonists forced them to leave, which greatly displeased his wife, it being her home town.

In 1682 he was invited to Strumica, Macedonia to teach public classes. There he also began to write books, but so as to not be confused with the author Ismail Hakki Ankaravi, a famous commentator on the Mathnavi, he came to be always given a suffix, such as Hâlvetî, Bursevi, or Üsküdari

Amongst Sufis, Bursa in Anatolia was first made famous by the 14th century Shāikhs Somuncu Baba and Haji Bayram, but in 1685 the then Sheykh of Bursa died and Fasli appointed Ismail Hakki as the new Sheykh. Unfortunately his first years in Bursa coincided with the difficult period after the Ottoman Empire's disastrous loss at the Battle of Vienna and the Holy League's invasion of the Ottoman Balkans, so Ismāʿīl Ḥaḳḳī became very poor and had to sell his books to survive.

In 1690 he journeyed to Cyprus to visit his master, Osman Farsli, who was in exile for his insistent criticism of Ottoman foreign policy. On his death Ismail Hakki succeeded him as the head of the order.

In 1695–1697 Sultan Mustafa II requested Ismail Hakki accompany his military campaigns against the Habsburg Empire and he was in several battles until he was severely wounded. Osman Farsli had foreseen the end of the Ottoman line and Bursevi defined the reason for its decline as the estrangement of spiritual and political powers, represented in his discourses by a Sheikh and a Sultan, thus formulating a Sufi interpretation of the Ottoman decline paradigm.

In 1700 Ismail Hakki performed the Hajj, the pilgrimage, but on returning from Mecca the caravan's members were slaughtered by Bedouin brigands. Ismail was left to die but managed to reach Damascus.

In 1700 he returned to Bursa. In 1717 he moved to Damascus and wrote 12 more books. In 1720 he returned to Üsküdar, the Anatolian part of Istanbul, where he began teaching again. However he was twice attacked by fanatical mobs and decided to return to Bursa.

In 1722, at Bursa he bequeathed his books to public libraries, left all his money for the construction of a small mosque, and entered into a retreat. That mosque is now within the Ismail Hakki Kur’an Kursu.

In July 1724 or 1725 he died in serenity. His tomb is at the rear of the mosque.

== Major works ==
İsmail Hakkı was one of the most prolific Ottoman scholars, with 106 books and pamphlets: 46 in Arabic and 60 in Turkish. To this day he is revered as an eminent literary figure in the Turkish language. He wrote on Islamic sciences, Sufism, Tasawuf, Islamic philosophy, morality and tafsir in a manner which avoided the flowery style of many contemporaries, resembling the style of Yunus Emre.

His most famous published works are:

- Rūḥ al-bayān ("The Spirit of Elucidation"), a voluminous esoteric interpretation of the Quran, combining the ideas of the author, Ibn Arabi and Al-Ghazali, and written in a Persian poetic form. (4637 pages, 4 vols. Boulaq, 1859)
- Rūḥ al-Mathnawī, a commentary on verses of the Masnavi (Istanbul, 1870–1872)
- A commentary on the Fusus al-Hikam by ibn ʻArabi, translated into English (Oxford, 1985–1991)
- Lübb’ül-Lüb (Kernel of the Kernel), translated into English (Cheltenham, 1980)
- Šarḥ-e pand-nāma-ye ʿAṭṭār, a translation of ʿAṭṭār’s Pand-nāma (Istanbul, 1772)
- Šarḥ-e Būstān; and a dīvān in Turkish (Cairo, 1841)
- Commentary on Najm al-Din Kubra's al-Uṣūl al-ʿašara (Istanbul, 1874)

== Teachings ==
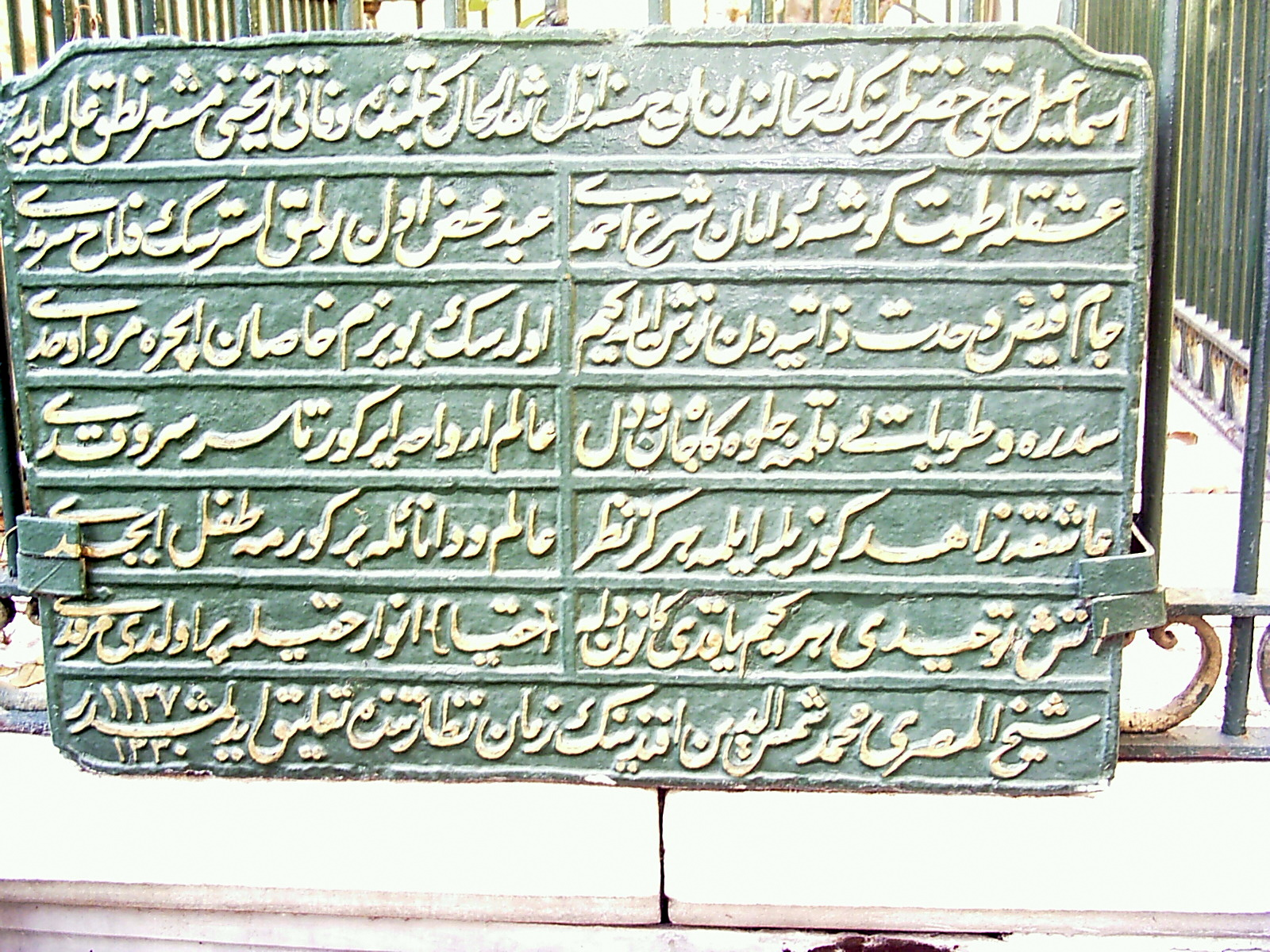
His tomb inscription expresses his sentiments

As a Sufi of Jelveti order, Ismail Hakki Bursevi put all his energy and resilience into being a ‘bearer of light’. The plaque on his tomb says:

"If you want to be a pure servant in everlasting salvation, hold onto the hem of Ahmad's Sharia with love.

If you want to drink from the cup of the effusion of essential Unity, then become the unique human in the most beautiful realm.

Don't let the Lote-tree or Ṭūbā captivate your soul and occupy the moment, reach up to the world of spirits, with all of yourself.

Never look at a lover with the eye of an ascetic, never think of a child learning their ABC as equal to a wise man of knowledge.

Whoever has lit the fire of Tawhid in their heart, O Hakki, their grave shall be illumined with the light of the Ḥaqq."

== Footnote ==
Yahya Michot said that "Ahmad's Sharia" on the plaque on the tomb refers to the Anatolian reformer Ahmad al-Rumi al-Aqhisari (d. 1632) who, called for sharia's "implementation as a way to curb the despotism and injustice of sultans and qadis. A barrier against tyranny..."

== See also ==
- Ibn 'Arabi
- Mahmud Hudayi
- Muhammed Hamdi Yazır
- Ebussuud Efendi
- Halveti
- Niyazi al-Misri
- List of composers of classical Turkish music
