= Hamdy =

Hamdy is a surname. Notable people with the surname include:

- Adam Hamdy (born 1974), British writer, film producer and director best known for his debut comic book limited series The Hunter
- Ahmed Hamdy (1929–1973), Egyptian general and sport shooter
- Ahmed Hamdy (footballer) (born 1998), Egyptian professional association football midfielder
- Al-Sayed Hamdy (born 1984), Egyptian football striker
- Emad Hamdy (1909–1984), Egyptian actor
- Hamdy Awad (born 1972), Egyptian indoor volleyball player, who played with the Egypt national team at the 2008 Summer Olympics
- Hamdy Kandeel, Egyptian T.V and Radio personality
- Hassan Hamdy, the 13th and current president of the Egyptian Al-Ahly Sporting Club

== See also ==
- Hamdi (disambiguation)
- HAMDY mine, Egyptian directional fragmentation mine based on the US Claymore mine and produced by the Maasara Company
- Handy (disambiguation)
- Hardy (disambiguation)
