= Hamdi =

Hamdi (Arabic: حمدي) is a masculine Arabic given name and surname. Notable people with the name include:

== Given name ==
- Hamdi Aslan (born 1967), Turkish footballer and coach
- Hamdi Al Banbi (1935–2016), Egyptian engineer and politician
- Hamdi Ali (born 1997), Qatari high jumper
- Hamdi Braa (born 1986), Tunisian basketball player
- Hamdi Harbaoui (born 1985), Tunisian footballer
- Hamdi Kasraoui (born 1983), Tunisian footballer
- Hamdi Kayapınar (born 1979), Turkish serial killer
- Hamdi Marzouki (born 1977), Tunisian footballer
- Hamdi al-Pachachi (1886–1948), Iraqi politician
- Hamdi Salihi (born 1984), Albanian footballer
- Hamdi Ulukaya (born 1972), Turkish businessman and entrepreneur of Kurdish descent
- Hamdy Wahiba, retired Egyptian military officer

== Middle name ==
- Ahmet Hamdi Boyacıoğlu (1920–1998), Turkish judge
- Ahmet Hamdi Tanpınar (1901–1962), Turkish writer
- Osman Hamdi Bey (1842–1910), Turkish archaeologist
- Serpil Hamdi Tüzün, Turkish youth coach

== Surname ==
- Hamd Allah Hamdi (1449–1503), Turkish poet
- Baligh Hamdi (1932–1993), Egyptian composer
- Emad Hamdy or Hamdi (1909–1984), Egyptian actor
- Khadidja Hamdi (died 2025), Sahrawi politician and activist
- Omar Hamdi (artist) (1952–2015), Syrian Kurdish artist
- Sami Hamdi, British political commentator and journalist
- Yaser Esam Hamdi (born 1980), former American citizen who was captured in Afghanistan in 2001

== See also ==
- Hamdi v. Rumsfeld, United States Supreme Court case
- Hamdi (DJ), remixer of piri & tommy's "words"
- Hamdy (disambiguation)
