= Akshamsaddin =

Ottoman scholar and scientist (1389–1459)

Akshamsaddin (Muhammad Shams al-Din bin Hamzah, Turkish: Akşemseddin) (1389 in Damascus – 16 February 1459 in Göynük, Bolu), was an influential Ottoman Sunni Muslim scholar, poet, and mystic saint.

== Biography ==
He was the grandson of Shahab al-Din al-Suhrawardi and a descendant of Abu Bakr al-Siddiq. He was an influential tutor and adviser to Sultan Mehmed the Conqueror. After completing his work with his master Sheikh Hacı Bayram-ı Veli, he founded the Shamsiyya-Bayramiyya Sufi order. He discovered the lost grave of Abu Ayyub al-Ansari (the companion of Muhammad) in Constantinople preceding the Siege of Constantinople.

In addition to his fame in religious sciences and Tasawwuf, Akshemsaddin was popular in the fields of medicine and pharmacology. There is not much reference to how he acquired this knowledge, but the Orientalist Elias John Wilkinson Gibb notes in his work History of Ottoman Poetry that Akshamsaddin learned from Haji Bayram Wali during his years with him. Akshamsaddin was also knowledgeable in the treatment of psychological and spiritual disorders. Akshamsaddin mentioned the microbe in his work Maddat ul-Hayat (The Material of Life) about two centuries prior to Antonie van Leeuwenhoek's discovery through experimentation:

It is incorrect to assume that diseases appear one by one in humans. Disease infects by spreading from one person to another. This infection occurs through seeds that are so small they cannot be seen but are alive.

It is known that he had 7 sons and 5 or 3 daughters. His youngest son was the noted poet Ḥamd Allāh Ḥamdī.

== Works ==
- Risalat an-Nuriya
- Khall-e Mushkilat
- Maqamat-e Awliya
- Kitab ut-Tib
- Maddat ul-Hayat
