= Mustafa Gaibi =

17th c. Bosnian dervish

Sheikh Mustafa Gaibi
- مصطفى افندى غائبي (Mustafā Efendi Ġā’ibī)
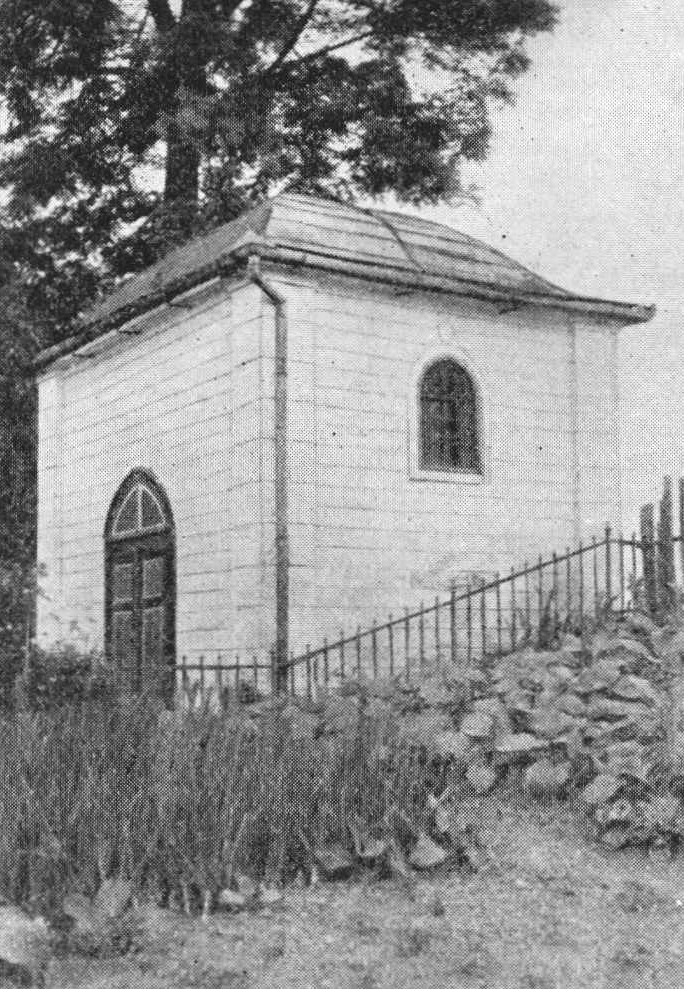
- Former turbe of Sheikh Gaibi at Stara Gradiška, photo from 1934

Personal life
- Born: Sanjak of Klis, Eyalet of Bosnia, Ottoman Empire
- Resting place: Gradiška, Republika Srpska, Bosnia and Herzegovina; 45.144°N 17.2468°E
- Flourished: 2nd half of the 17th century
- Notable work: Risāle-i tarīkatnāme
- Other name: Gaibija

Religious life
- Religion: Islam
- Order: Jelveti
- Philosophy: Sufism

Sheikh Mustafa Gaibi or Gaibija was a 17th-century dervish from Ottoman Bosnia whose mausoleum (turbe) at Stara Gradiška in Slavonia, in present-day Croatia, became a prominent site of ritual visitation by Muslims. He was regarded as a prophet by some Catholics. He wrote in Ottoman Turkish a discourse on the rules of the Jelveti Sufi order, to which he belonged. He also wrote letters in which he criticized various kinds of wrongdoing that he regarded as widespread in the Ottoman Empire. His letters contain mystical-looking expressions that are difficult to understand. He is reputed to have predicted the defeat of Ottomans at the Battle of Vienna in 1683 and the subsequent loss of their territories north of the river Sava. According to a local Catholic source, an Ottoman soldier killed Gaibi in Stara Gradiška, at the left bank of the Sava, after he refused to escape with other Muslims across the river before the advancing Habsburg army; they captured Stara Gradiška in 1688. In 1954, his turbe was transferred across the Sava, to the town of Gradiška in Bosnia and Herzegovina.

== Life ==
Very little is known about the life of Mustafa Gaibi. He was born around the turn of the 17th century, possibly in the Sanjak of Klis, a western part of the Eyalet of Bosnia, in the Ottoman Empire. He joined the Jelveti order of the mystical form of Islam known as Sufism, and he became a Sufi sheikh, i.e., the spiritual master of a group of dervishes. His sobriquet is derived from the Arabic adjective ghayb, meaning "hidden" or "mysterious"; he is referred to in Ottoman Turkish as Mustafā Efendi Ġā’ibī (مصطفى افندى غائبي). His sheikh was Mahmud Hudayi, who was a famous Sufi writer and the re-organizer of the Jelveti order. Hudayi was based in the Üsküdar district of Istanbul, where he died in 1628. Gaibi corresponded with men of high rank, criticizing various kinds of wrongdoing, such as violence, licentiousness, false piety, corruption and bribery, which he saw as widespread in the Ottoman Empire. In one of his letters, he signed himself as el-faqīr Ġā’ibī ser-i haydūdān-i Kūprez, meaning "Fakir (or poor) Gaibi, the leader of the hajduks from Kupres". This is quite unexpected for a dervish, as hajduks were mostly Christian brigands who defied Ottoman rule in the Balkans. There are records of some Muslim hajduks, but Gaibi's signature was probably a symbolic protest against wrongdoings by the ruling class. He had a son, who was also a dervish.

A chronicle written in Latin by a Catholic priest in 1838, titled Liber memorabilium parochiae Vetero-Gradiscanae (Book of Remembrance of the Stara Gradiška Parish), contains a section titled "De sepulcro magni prophetae Gaibia", or "About the Grave of the Great Prophet Gaibia". According to this source, Gaibi lived in the fortress of Stara Gradiška when the Great Turkish War broke out in 1683. Located at the left bank of the Sava in the region of Slavonia, this fortress and the settlement within it were part of the town of Gradiška, which extended on both sides of the river. Gradiška was taken by the Ottomans in 1535, as part of their northward expansion into the lands of the Kingdom of Hungary after the Battle of Mohács. The conquest of Slavonia was completed by 1559, and Ottoman culture and Islam spread into this region, along with the influx of Muslim population from Bosnia. The presence of dervishes is well attested in Slavonia.

Gaibi is the best known among the dervishes who lived in Slavonia. Liber, however, proposes that he might have been a Christian. It states that he made the sign of the cross on the doors of some houses during a plague epidemic, and that those households were spared from the disease. In 1683, the Grand Vizier Kara Mustafa Pasha led the Ottoman army to conquer Vienna. According to Liber, he sent a messenger to Gaibi to ask him how it would turn out. Gaibi predicted a bad outcome for the Ottomans and great losses of their troops, to whom he also spoke in that sense as they passed through Gradiška. After the defeat at Vienna, Kara Mustafa Pasha asked Gaibi again a similar question. Gaibi responded with the short statement, Sava međa i moja leđa, meaning "Sava border and my back" in Serbo-Croatian. The Austrian army took the Stara Gradiška fortress in 1688, and the Ottomans recaptured it in 1690, only to lose it finally in 1691. According to Liber, its Muslim inhabitants escaped across the Sava, but Gaibi wanted to stay there. Enraged by this, an Ottoman soldier killed Gaibi with an axe. The Austrians found his body and buried it at the river bank near a gate of the fortress. In the Treaty of Karlowitz, signed in 1699, the Sava was confirmed as a new border between the Ottoman and Habsburg Empires.

== Turbe ==
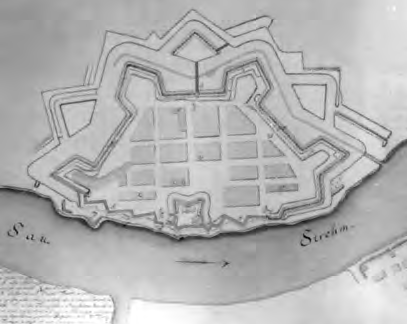
Plan of the Stara Gradiška fortress from 1750

After the peace was established, Muslims from neighbouring Bosnia and other parts of the Ottoman Empire began visiting and praying at Gaibi's grave. In Islamic tradition, such ritual visitations are based on the belief in "the workings of divine grace through specific saintly individuals for whom death has brought higher levels of spiritual authority and capacity for intercession thanks to their deeds and virtues in life". Leaving Gaibi's grave, the pilgrims would take some earth from it and keep it as a source of beneficial power. According to Liber, Muslims began venerating Gaibi after they realized that his prophecies had come true: they were defeated at Vienna with heavy losses, and the Sava became a border, while a mark of this border was Gaibi's back, i.e., his body buried at the river bank. In a legend collected in Gradiška and recorded in 1936 in the Serbian newspaper Politika, Gaibi is represented as a cephalophore walking on the surface of the river with his severed head under his arm.

It was initially rather complicated for Muslims to visit Gaibi's grave, as persons entering Habsburg lands from the Ottoman Empire had to spend some time in quarantine first. Many Muslims thus prayed in Gradiška at the right bank of the Sava, opposite the grave. In the mid-18th century, Muslims requested of Habsburg authorities to transfer Gaibi's remains to Gradiška, also known then by its Turkish name Berbir. They were denied, but the authorities allowed for pilgrims to visit the grave without quarantine and constructed a picket fence around it. A plan of the Stara Gradiška fortress drawn in 1750 shows the grave of the "prophet Gaibia", as he is named in the plan's legend. In 1825, Emperor Francis I of Austria ordered building a little mausoleum around it; it was an open, three-wall structure with a roof. In 1832, General Haecht, the commander of the fortress, allowed Muslims to rebuild and arrange Gaibi's turbe as per their own design. Austrian press reported in August 1858 about Turkish pilgrims from Asia visiting the turbe. It was renovated in 1868, obtaining its final form. An iron fence was later constructed around it, and a flower garden was planted in its yard.

It was the northernmost turbe in the Kingdom of Yugoslavia, established in 1918. In 1954, after World War II and the establishment of socialist federal Yugoslavia, the People's Republic of Croatia requested that the turbe be moved to the People's Republic of Bosnia and Herzegovina. It was thus rebuilt in Gradiška within the cemetery at a mosque, where it is also today. It is a square structure with a hip roof, of smaller dimensions than the previous turbe at Stara Gradiška. After 1954, the only turbe that remains in the former Ottoman lands north of the Sava is the turbe of Gül Baba, a 16th-century Turkish dervish, in Budapest.

== Writings ==
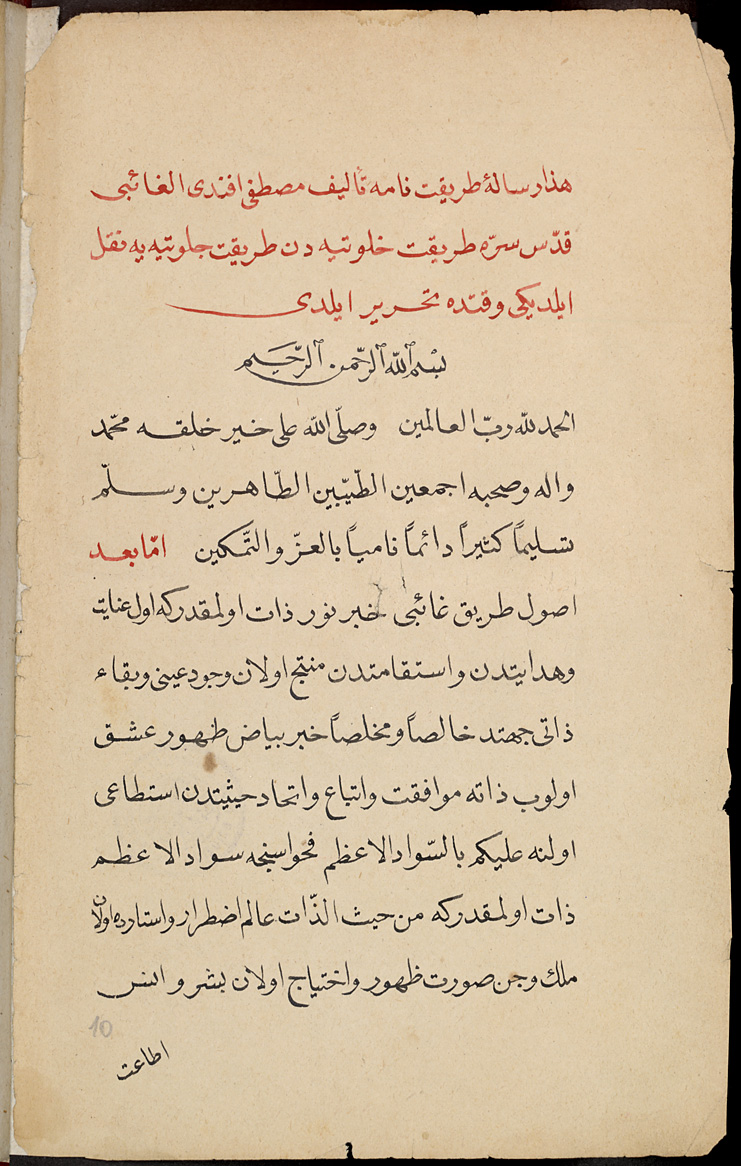
Risāle-i tarīkatnāme by Gaibi, folio 1v, the manuscript 426 TF 7

Gaibi wrote a discourse in Ottoman Turkish about the rules of the Jelveti order, titled Risāle-i tarīkatnāme, two copies of which are preserved in the University Library in Bratislava, Slovakia (the manuscripts 426 TF 7 and 427 TG 20). They are part of Bašagić's Collection of Islamic manuscripts, which is kept in the library. A Sharia judge from Gradiška donated in 1894 a booklet titled Risalei Šerife Šejh Mustafa-efendi Gaibi to the turbe at Stara Gradiška. It is a collection of seven writings by Gaibi in Ottoman Turkish, including a discourse on the Sufi piety, a dirge for Bosnia, a testament to his son, and four letters. Three more letters by Gaibi are found in Kadić's Collection, kept in the Gazi Husrev-beg Library in Sarajevo. They were copied from a lost chronicle written by Husejn-efendija Muzaferija (1646–1721), an Islamic scholar from Sarajevo. There is a poem referred to as Kasida Gaibija, but its authorship is a matter of debate.

As is common In Sufi writings, Gaibi often uses allusion and allegory. His discourses, his testament, and his letter to his son are of a didactic character, while his other writings contain shathiyyat, i.e., strange expressions of a Sufi mystic in ecstasy. Many statements in his letters are difficult to understand. The first work in Risalei Šerife is his letter to a dervish in Sarajevo, in which he signed himself as Topuz Baba, meaning "Father Mace". Here Gaibi states, "I walk on the earth and give light to the stars. I am at the third stage. But the light also falls on roses and sheep droppings. I need none of that." In his letter to Mehmed-čelebija of Jajce, Gaibi reproaches him, "A Turk fell in love with an Italian woman." In the dirge, Gaibi laments over Bosnia that is pressed by enemies on all sides, and he adds hopefully, "When appear the first, second and third mīm (م), conquests arise. And when emerge jīm and kāf (ج and ك), Islam will be fine." Gaibi, like other Sufis, ascribes some mystical meaning to Arabic letters.

Gaibi's letter to Sultan Mehmed IV has an introduction composed by someone else. Gaibi, who lived in Banja Luka, was invited to visit the sultan in Belgrade, but he sent the letter instead. It was so enigmatic that a scholar was engaged to interpret it. It consisted of twelve points; e.g., the eighth point stated, "There are many skins, but one is missing." This was interpreted to mean that the sultan's realm abounded in violence, lies, licentiousness, corruption, and other vices, all of which was the wrong way, while the right way was missing, as no one held on to it. Another manuscript collection contains a copy of this letter, and in it he is signed as "Fakir Gaibi, the leader of the hajduks from Kupres". Two letters by Gaibi to the Grand Vizier Suleiman Pasha in Belgrade, dated to 1686, are found in Kadić's Collection. The first of them resembles the letter to the sultan and has the same signature as in that copy of it. In his second letter to Suleiman Pasha, Gaibi states, "In the Ottoman Empire, there is no religion that is not full of violence. Regarding bribery, you [all] have made it so public and only through it one can get things done." In the end, Gaibi blesses him. In his letter to Davud-efendija, the Kadi of Banja Luka, Gaibi dares him to ravage Banja Luka as he did in Užice.
