= Bayramiye =

Sufi mystic order in Sunni Islam

Bayramiye, Bayramiyya, or Bayramism is a Turkish Sufi order (Tariqa) founded by Haji Bayram Veli (Hacı Bayram-ı Veli) in Ankara around the year 1400 AD. The order spread to the then Ottoman capital Istanbul where there were several Tekkes and into the Balkans, especially in Bosnia, Macedonia and Greece. The order also spread into Egypt where a Tekke was found in the capital, Cairo.

== Influence ==
Although the order is now virtually non-existent, its influence can be seen in Aziz Mahmud Hudayi, and the prolific writer and Muslim saint İsmail Hakkı Bursevî. The 14th century Ottoman Islamic scholar Muhammad Birgivi, who was a critic of degeneracy within the Ottoman lands and author of the famous book, eṭ-Ṭarîḳatü' l-Muḥammediyye, was one of the most influential members within the order.

== See also ==
- Sufism
- Naqshbandiyya
- Khalwatiyya
- Zahediyya
- Rifa'iyya
