= Telli Baba =

Muslim Sufi saint

Telli Baba, a Muslim saint and Shaykh of the Qadiri Sufi order buried on the Bosphorus coast in the Sarıyer district of Istanbul.

There are several legends about the identity of Telli Baba. According to some sources, his real name was Imam Abdullah Efendi, and he was killed in action while serving as chaplain in the Military of the Ottoman Empire of Mehmed the Conqueror.

People have reported their wishes coming true after visiting and supplicating at the tomb.

== Four Patron Saints of the Bosphorus ==
Along with Joshua, Aziz Mahmud Hudayi, and Yahya Efendi the four are considered to be the Four Patron Saints of the Bosphorus.
