= Hamd Allah Hamdi =

Turkish poet (1449 – 1503)

Personal life
- Born: c. 853 AH/1449 CE Göynük, Ottoman Empire
- Died: c. 909 AH/1503 CE Göynük, Ottoman Empire
- Notable work(s): Yūsuf ve Zuleyk̲h̲ā (Yusuf and Zuleykha)

Religious life
- Religion: Islam
- Denomination: Sunni

Ḥamd Allāh Ḥamdī (born Göynük 853 AH/1449 CE, died Göynük 909 AH/1503 CE), was a Turkish poet, born at Göynük near Bolu. He was the youngest of the twelve sons of the famous s̲h̲ayk̲h̲ Ak Shams al-Din, who had succeeded Heci Bayram as the superior of the Bayramiyya. Hamdi lost his father at the age of ten. He had an unhappy childhood, which probably inspired him to write his famous Masnavi Yūsuf ve Zuleyk̲h̲ā.

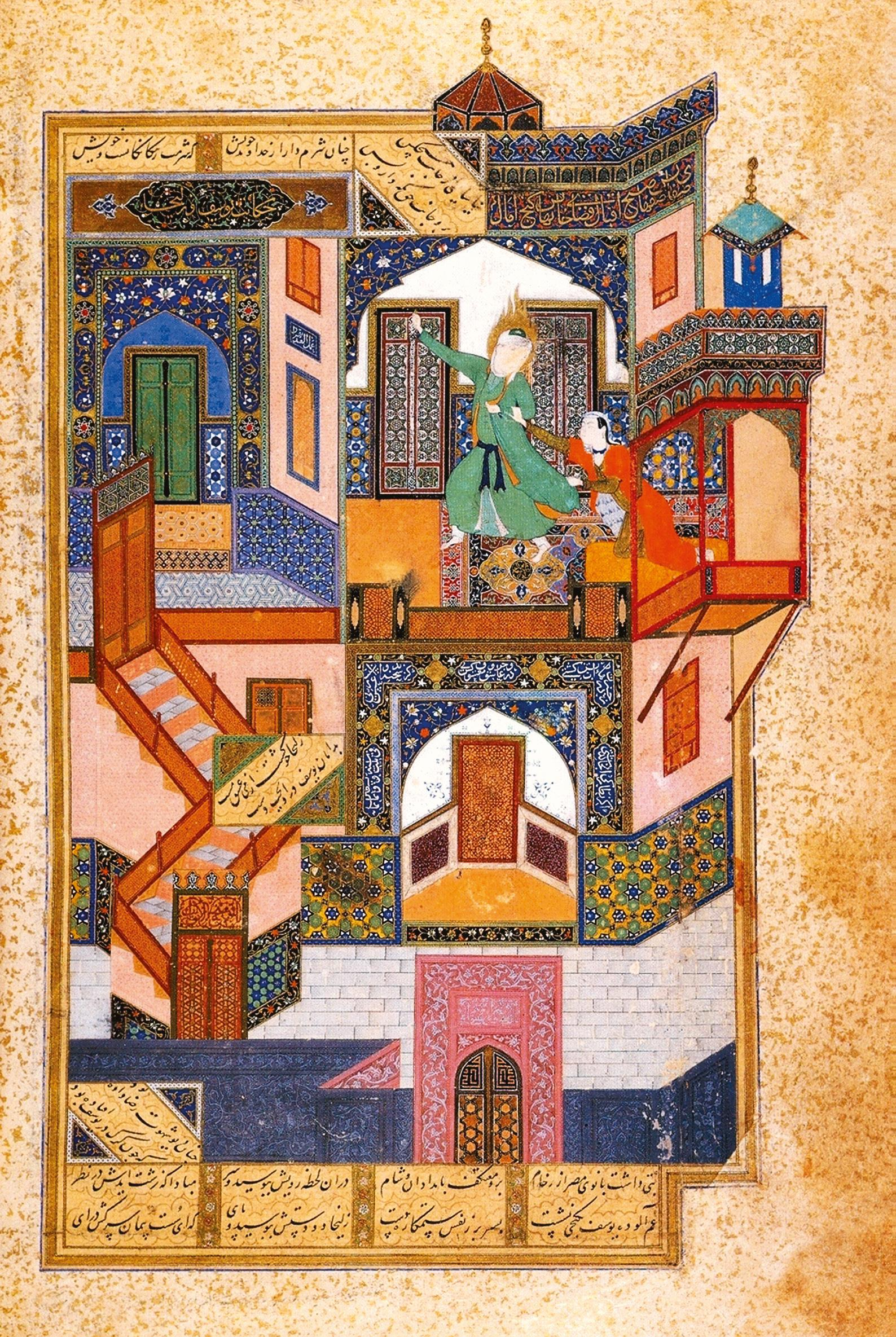
Yusuf and Zulaikha (Yusuf pursued by Potiphar's wife), miniature by Behzād, 1488. This illustrates the life of Hamdi.

In the introductory part of his Yūsuf we Züleyk̲h̲ā (as found in Istanbul, MS Üniversite T.Y. 675, fols. 11b-12a) he relates that his lazy, ignorant and quarrelsome brothers treated him badly and were jealous of him because of the great affection their father Aḳ S̲h̲ams al-Dīn showed him: "Joseph reached the extremity of his misfortunes, there is no end to my suffering". Although he has little to nothing laudatory to say of his brothers, some of them are mentioned in the sources as outstanding ʿulemāʾ.
