= Yahya Efendi =

Ottoman Islamic scholar (1494–1570)

Yahya Efendi or Molla Shaykhzadeh ul Yahya (1494 in Trabzon – 1570 in Istanbul), Ottoman Islamic scholar, sufi sheikh, and poet buried in Beshiktash, Istanbul.

He served as a teacher of sacred sciences during the reign of Sultan Suleiman the Magnificent. Yahya Efendi had close ties with the palace, and consulted the Sultan throughout his life. After retirement, he built a dergah, numerous buildings and charitable trusts in Beshiktash, and planted trees in the area.

== Biography ==
Beşiktaşi Yahya Efendi is also known as Mudarris Molla Şeyhzade. The earliest information about his life is in Âşık Çelebi's Meşâirü'ş-Şuarâ, Âlî Mustafa Efendi's Künhü'l-Ahbâr, Kınalızâde Hasan Çelebi's Tezkiretü'ş-Şuarâ and Mehmed Dâî's Menâkıb, the last source being one of his disciples and a descendant of Şaban Efendi. In later works, references were made to these sources in general. His father is Shami Ömer Efendi and his mother is Afife Hatun. In some sources, it is recorded that his father was from Amasya. During the period when Ömer Efendi was a judge in Trabzon, Bayezid II's son, Şehzade (Prince) Selim, was the sanjak-bey of Trabzon. It is possible to infer that a friendship was established between Ömer Efendi and the prince during this period. The birth of Prince Selim's son, Süleyman, a few days after Yahya Efendi's birth, probably brought the two families closer together. As a matter of fact, it is stated that when the milk of Şehzade Süleyman's mother was not enough, Afife Hatun also breastfed the prince and they were the foster-brothers of Yahya Efendi and Sultan Suleyman. It is not known where Ömer Efendi served after Trabzon, but it is recorded that he returned to Damascus and died there.

Yahya Efendi spent his childhood and youth in Trabzon. Atai states that he often went into seclusion in a cave outside the city during this period and this lasted for seven years. It can be assumed that he completed his education in one of the madrasahs in Trabzon in the same period. After Sultan Selim's ascension to the throne, Yahya Efendi moved to Istanbul with his family in the entourage of Şehzade Süleyman. He completed his education in Istanbul with Zenbilli Ali Efendi. After the death of his teacher, he started to work as a professor at Canbaz Mustafa Madrasa for 15 coins a day. Afterwards, he worked as a professor in the madrasahs of Hacıhasanzâde, Efdaliye, Coban Mustafa Pasha in Gebze, Mihrimah Sultan in Üsküdar, and Sahn-ı Semân, where he was appointed to replace Kadızâde Ahmed Şemseddin Efendi in 960 AH (1553 AD). Two years after his appointment to duty, he was at odds with Sultan Suleyman, because Mahidevran Hatun was expelled from the palace after the murder of Prince Mustafa, and he was dismissed from his post because of an affidavit he wrote to Sultan for her readmission to the palace. Then he was retired with 50 akçe per day. Âşık Çelebi reports that Yahya Efendi was very upset about this situation. Although Suleiman the Magnificent dismissed Yahya Efendi from his post, it is understood that he did not interfere much in his activities. It is rumored that in the following years, the Sultan sent gifts of gold and silver to the Sheikh, and the Sheikh sent some products that he had grown in his garden to the Sultan.

After leaving his job, he bought a large land in Beşiktaş with his own means and spent the rest of his life in the dervish lodge he founded here (Yahya Efendi Külliyyesi). It is stated that he went to the region named Hıdırlık, which is considered to be the meeting place of Moses and Hızır by the Bosphorus, through a sign from a person he saw in his dream, and established his tekke. Some sources state that the grave of Prophet Yusha in Beykoz was discovered by Yahya Efendi. Kınalızâde Hasan Çelebi writes that he had a mosque, madrasah and bath built in Yoros in Anadolukavağı. It states in Menakib that Yahyâ Efendi often went to Yoros to rest. The funeral prayer of Yahya Efendi, who died on the night of Eid-al-Adha on 9 Dhu al-Hijjah 978 (May 4, 1571), was performed by Ebussuud Efendi in the Süleymaniye Mosque after the Eid prayer and he was buried in the place where his dergah is located. A large crowd of state officials, ulama and the public attended the funeral. A mausoleum was built on the site of the dervish lodge by the order of Sultan Selim.

== Four Patron Saints of the Bosphorus ==
Along with Aziz Mahmud Hudayi, Telli Baba, and Prophet Joshua, the four are considered to be the Four Patron Saints of the Bosphorus.

== See also ==
- Hayreddin Barbarossa, buried on the coast in Beshiktash, Istanbul
