= Mustafa Devati =

Ottoman mystic, scribe, and Hanafi Maturidi Islamic scholar

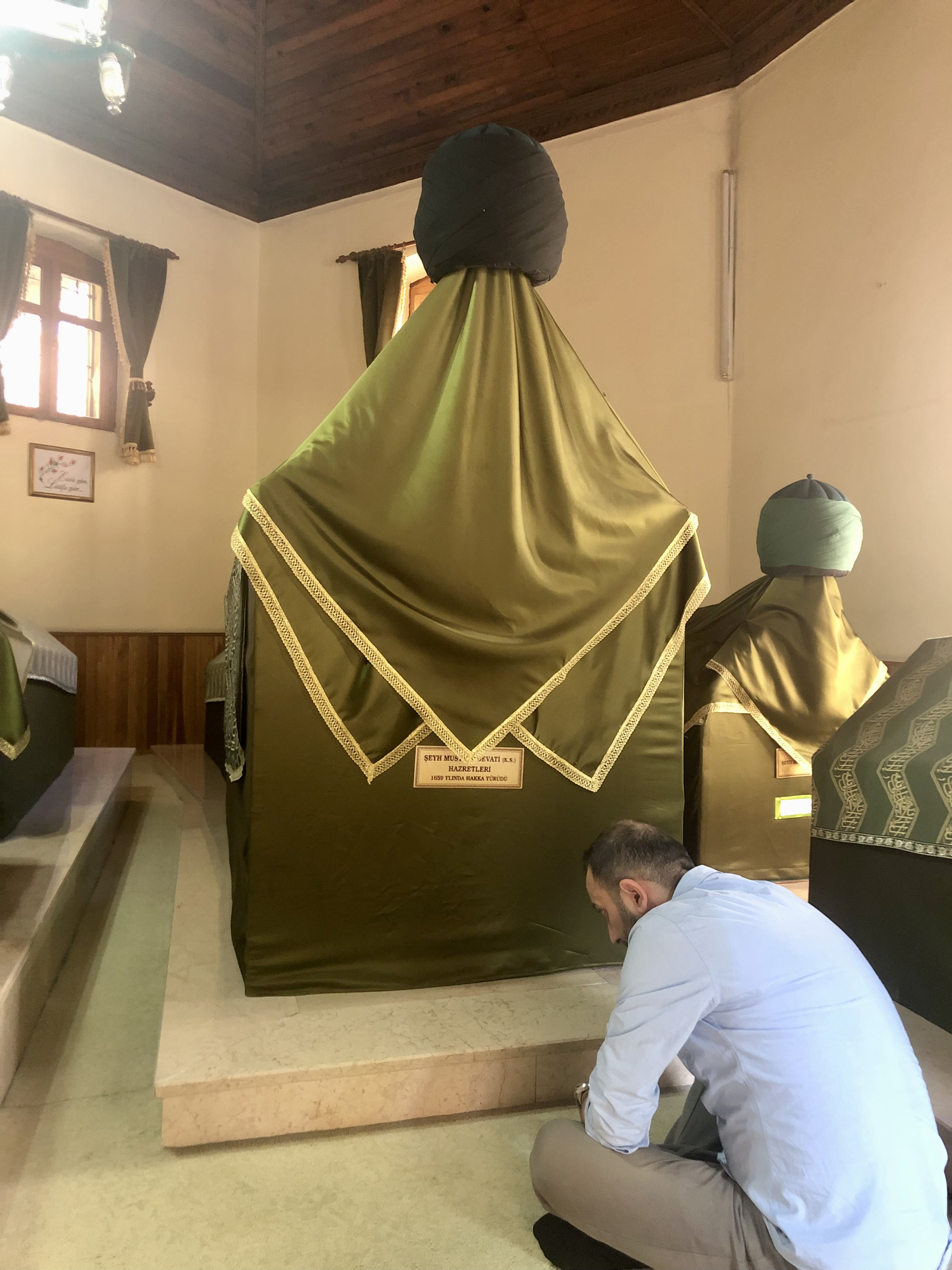
Tomb (türbe) of Mustafa Devati in Üsküdar

Sheikh Mustafa Devati Efendi aka Devâtî Mustafa Efendi (d. 1070 AH/1660 AD), was a Jelveti sheikh of the 17th century Ottoman Empire. He was the son of Arslan Ağa. Since his youth he worked as a scribe (divitçi or devâtî) and was hence given the name Devâtî.

He became affiliated with the Jelveti sufi order through Muk'ad Ahmed Efendi, a successor (khalifa) of Aziz Mahmud Hudayi Efendi. He advanced quickly along the Sufi path and was sent by Muk'ad Ahmed Efendi to guide (irshad) the people of Kastamonu. After a period there, he returned to Istanbul and joined the scholars (ulama).

Seven years later, he passed the exam and was appointed a professor at a madrasah with a salary of 40 akce. He started teaching at Molla Kestel Madrasah in 1061 AH (1651 AD). He continued in this position for a year. Between the years 1062-1067 (1652-1657), he worked as a professor in place of Vânî Ali Efendi at the Valide Sultan Dar al-Hadith in Üsküdar. He left academic life in 1067 (1657) and started his guidance activities by transforming the mosque built by Arslan Ağazade Mustafa Bey in 1061 (1651), in the Bülbülderesi Selmanağa neighborhood in Üsküdar, into a tekke/khanqah. He died here after three years of service and was buried in his tomb in the garden of the lodge known today as Şeyhcâmii Tekkesi or the Devâtî Mustafa Efendi Tekkesi.

== Legacy ==
Following Devati’s death, his successors (khalifas) Abdülbâki Dede and Fidancı Mehmed Efendi continued the service of guidance. Devati's son, Divitçizâde Mehmed Talib Efendi, completed his mystical upbringing with Fidancı Mehmed Efendi after his father's death and became a sheikh as well.

== Works ==
The only known work of Mustafa Devâtî is Tuhfet as-Sufiyyin. In this work, the author tells about his discoveries and dreams on the way of tasawwuf (Sufism), he also included some sections about his life from time to time. The work was simplified and published with a review by Necdet Tosun.

Mustafa Devâtî states that it is easy to progress on the path of Sufism, but it is difficult to stay at the point of perfection. He thinks that in order to reach the secrets of unity, seclusion is accepted as a condition and it is very difficult to be with Allah (God) in public. Devati points out the difference in degrees between lovers of God (ashiqs), ascetics (zahids) and common people (awam) with an analogy: the lovers are considered grapes, the devoted ascetics are like melons, and the common people are like plums; lovers will be recognized on the Day of Judgment just as everyone knows how grapes taste, the taste of a mellon cannot be known until it is cut open, and everyone knows plums can be sour.

== Bibliography ==
- Mustafa Devâtî, Tuhfetü’s-sûfiyyîn, İstanbul Belediyesi Atatürk Kitaplığı, Belediye, nr. 438, vr. 32b-48b.
- Uşşâkīzâde İbrâhim, Zeyl-i Şekāik (nşr. H. J. Kissling), Wiesbaden 1965, s. 561.
- Şeyhî, Vekāyiu’l-fuzalâ, I, 575.
- Ayvansarâyî, Hadîkatü’l-cevâmi‘, II, 198.
- Sicill-i Osmânî, IV, 393.
- Hüseyin Vassâf, Sefîne, III, 13-14, 19.
- Şeyh Mustafa Devâtî Kuddise Sirruhû ve Tuhfetü’s-sûfiyyîn (s.nşr. Necdet Tosun), İstanbul 1997.
- Ahmed Tahir Nur, “Kitabeleriyle Üsküdar’da Bir Celveti Tekkesi: Şeyh Mustafa Devâtî Efendi Cami-Tevhidhanesi”, Toplumsal Tarih, sy. 248, İstanbul 2014, s. 78-84.
