= Tutsak (novel) =

- Author: Emine Işınsu
- Language: Turkish
- Publication date: 1973
- Publication place: Turkey
- Pages: 200
- ISBN: 978-6-055-26186-3

Tutsak, published in 1973, is a novel by Turkish author Emine Işınsu. It portrays Turkey before the 1960 coup and the Kirkuk Turkmens.

== Details ==
It is a classic novel based on real-life events and characters. The work reflects on the concepts of captivity and freedom through three intertwined forms of imprisonment: the captivity of the Kirkuk Turkmens under Arab rule, the societal constraints in 1950s Turkey, and the captivity of a woman trapped in an unhappy marriage.

The novel, consisting of 15 chapters, is narrated using an omniscient point of view. The inner worlds of the main characters—Ceren, Tarık, Orhan, and Selma—are revealed through flashbacks to events that shaped their lives and influenced their present. Ceren's perspective, in particular, is portrayed using the stream-of-consciousness technique.

The main character, Ceren, carries traces of Emine Işınsu, while Ceren's daughter, Alev, reflects aspects of Işınsu's own daughter, Yağmur.

== Plot ==
The main character, Ceren, is a painter in an unhappy marriage with Orhan, a contractor from a family in Erbil. Orhan's cousin, Tarık, arrives in Istanbul to raise awareness in Turkey about the plight of the Kirkuk Turkmens and to unite them under a cultural association. His efforts deeply affect Ceren. Through her acquaintance with Tarık, Ceren begins to question her surroundings and seek meaning in life. After establishing the association, Tarık returns to his country, only to be killed during the July 14, 1959 massacre, in which many Turkmen intellectuals were murdered.

During his time in Turkey, Tarık frequently visits Ceren's studio, sharing stories of the harsh treatment the Iraqi authorities imposed on the Turkmens. Following Tarık's death, Ceren strives to break free from her own captivity. She returns to her artistic pursuits, files for divorce, and starts a new chapter in her life.
