= Göynük =

- Municipality
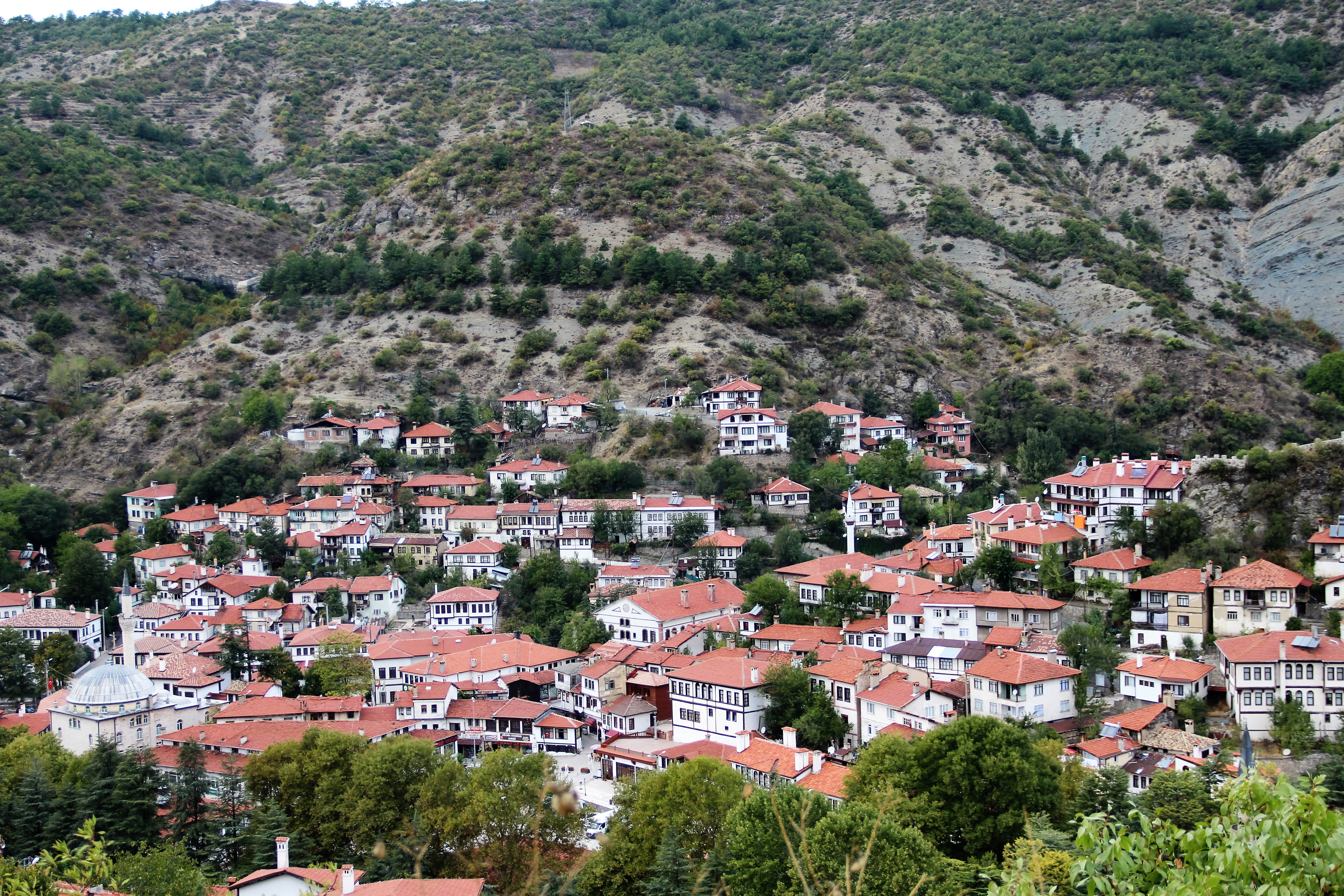

- Location within Turkey
- Coordinates: 40°23′59″N 30°47′07″E
- Country: Turkey
- Province: Bolu
- District: Göynük

Government
  - Mayor: Ahmet Çankaya (MHP)
- Population (2021): 4,376
- Time zone: UTC+3 (TRT)
- Website: www.goynuk.bel.tr

Göynük is a town in Bolu Province in the Black Sea region of Turkey. It is the seat of Göynük District. Its population is 4,376 (2021). The mayor is Ahmet Çankaya (MHP), elected in 2019. Its neighbours are Mudurnu from north-east, Nallıhan from south-east, Sarıcakaya from south, Yenipazar from south-west, Taraklı from west and Akyazı from north-west.

== History ==
The area has a long history of occupation going back to the Phrygians, Lydians, Persians and Ancient Romans. It was known as Koinon Gallicanon in antiquity. The Çatak Hamamı bathhouse dates back to Roman times. Göynük was absorbed into the Ottoman Empire in the early 14th century. In the late 19th and early 20th century, Göynük was part of the Kastamonu Vilayet of the Ottoman Empire.

== Sights ==
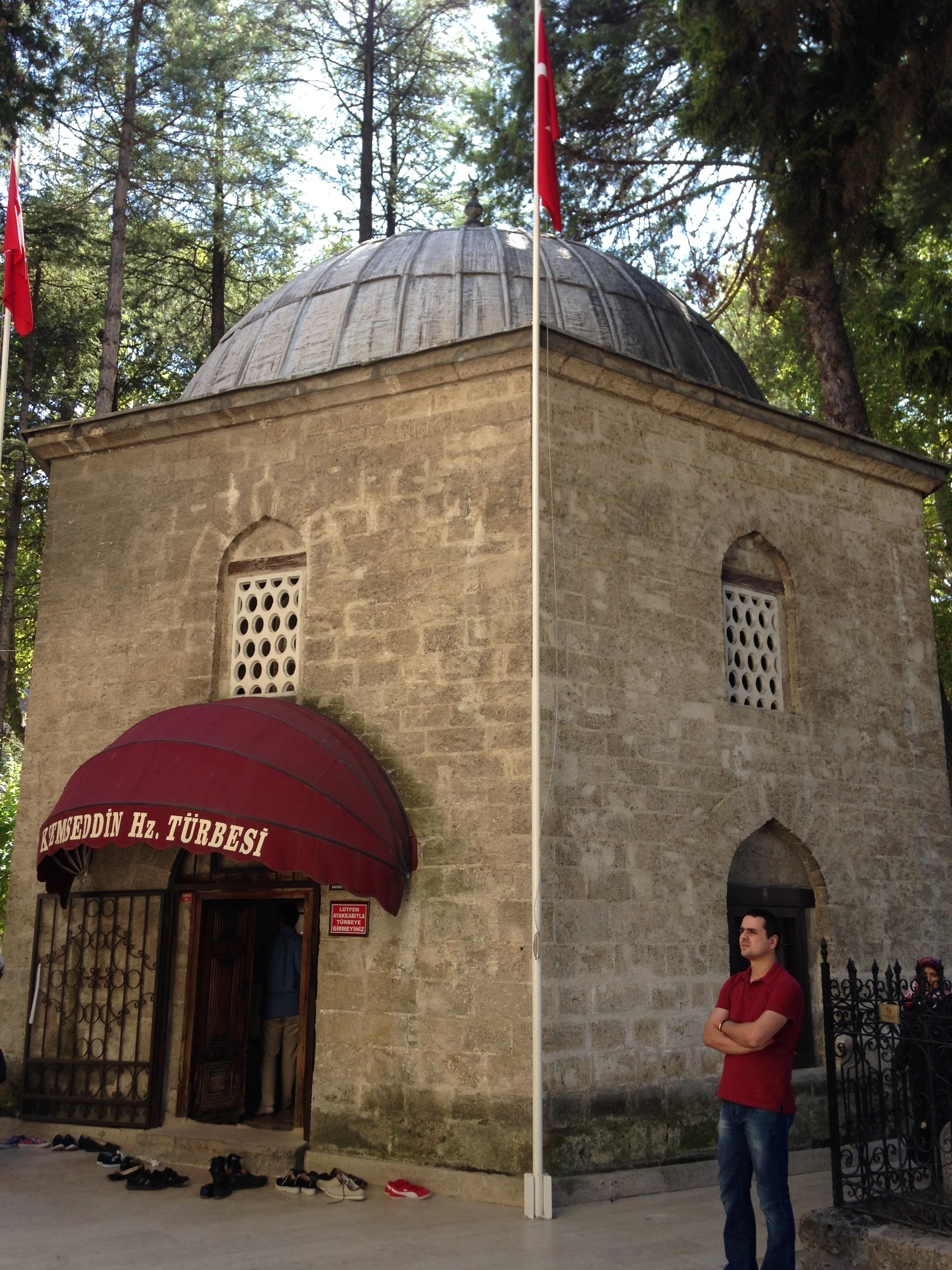
The tomb of Akshamsaddin (Turkish: Ak Şemsettin) (1389-1459) in Göynük; an influential Ottoman religious scholar.

Göynük has over 100 early 20th century Ottoman Empire period houses, these plus the even older mosques, tombs, fountains, and hammams makes it a town of historical interest, and a location of narrow streets, with a stream running through the centre. The victory tower on the hill at the top of the town and the old Ottoman mansion called "Müderrisoğlu Konağı" at the centre are landmarks of Göynük.

The most significant entombed saint of Göynük is Akshamsaddin (Turkish: Ak Şemsettin) (1389-1459), an influential Ottoman religious scholar, poet, mystic saint, and guide of Mehmed the Conqueror.

== Trivia ==
Göynük was used as a location of films including Akrebin Yolculuğu by Ömer Kavur, El Yazısı and a number of Turkish TV series e.g. Aynalar and Rüzgarlı Bahçe.

== Notable natives ==
- Bıçakçı Ömer Dede, original name Omar Sikkin, an edge tool maker and student of Haji Bayram Wali.
- Debbağ Dede, a tanner known for his miracle during the Hajj pilgrimage.
- Aksungur Dede, one of the first ghazis to cross from Anatolia to Rumelia, 14th-15th century.
