= HAMDY mine =

Directional fragmentation mine

The HAMDY mine is an Egyptian directional fragmentation landmine based on the US Claymore mine, produced by the Maasara Company. The mine consists of a rectangular sand-colored plastic main body with a convex face, inside which is a layer of approximately 700 steel fragments embedded in a main charge of cast explosive. The mine is supported by two sets of scissor type legs. On the top of the mine is a crude peep sight, and two detonator wells which accept electrical command detonators or MUV style trip fuzes. When triggered the mine scatters fragments in an arc of 60 degrees to a range of 50 meters and a height of approximately two meters.

The mine has been used in Afghanistan and Angola.
