= Hacı Bayram Mosque =

Mosque in Altındağ, Ankara, Turkey

Coordinates: 39°56′39″N 32°51′28″E

Haji Bayram Mosque
- Hacı Bayram Camii
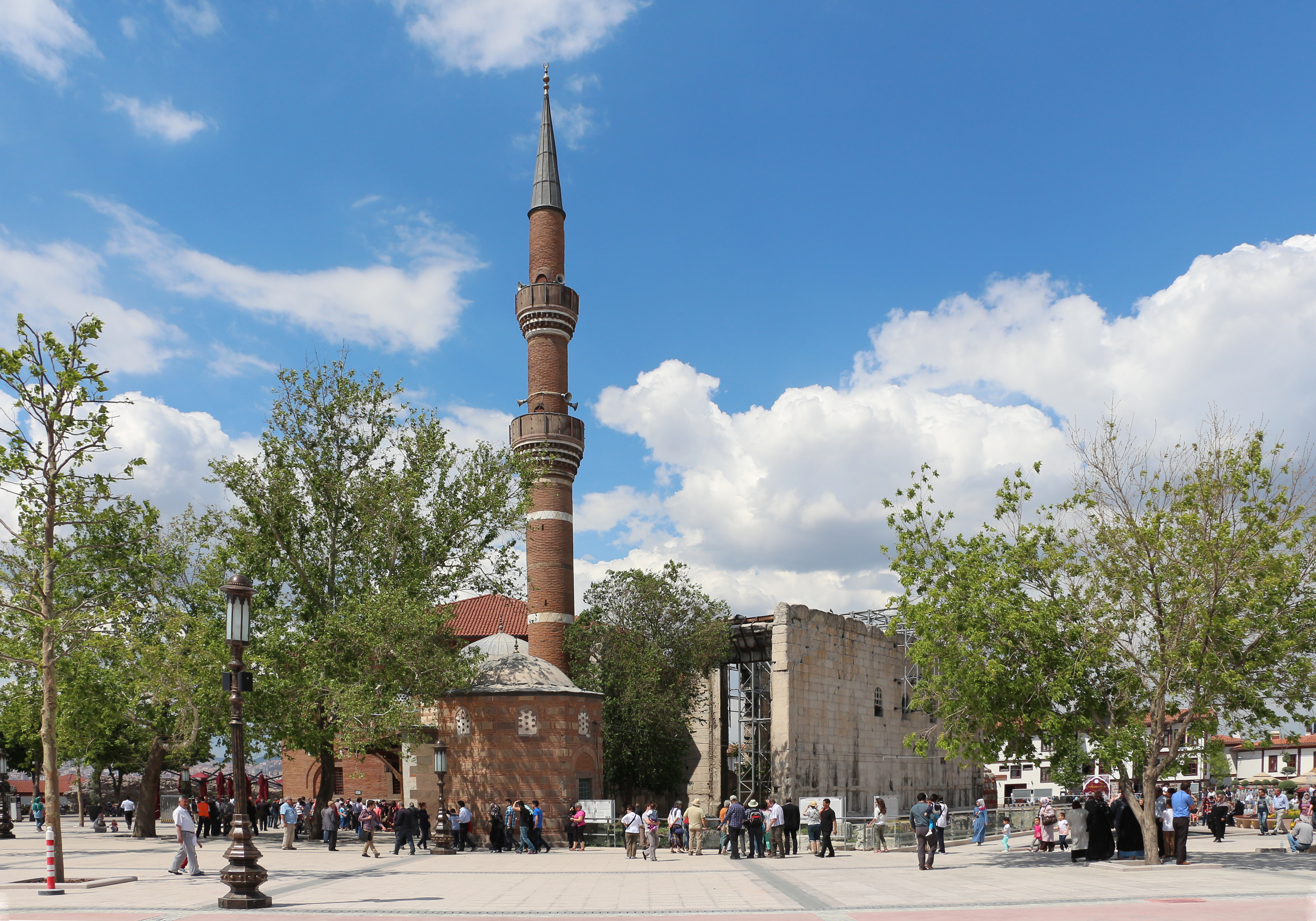

Religion
- Affiliation: Islam

Location
- Location: Altındağ, Ankara, Turkey
- Interactive map of Haji Bayram Mosque

Architecture
- Architect: Mehmet Bey
- Groundbreaking: 1427
- Completed: 1428

Specifications
- Length: 20 m
- Width: 20 m
- Dome height (outer): 30 m
- Minaret: 1
- Minaret height: 50 m

Haji Bayram Mosque is a mosque in old Ankara, Turkey. Along with Kocatepe Mosque it is one of the best known mosques in Ankara. Hacı Bayram Mosque was built during the Ottoman Empire period. It was named after the Turkish Sufi and poet Haji Bayram Veli on behalf of the latter. Haji Bayram Mosque is one of the touristic places of Ankara. The site was added in 2016 to the tentative list of UNESCO World Heritage Sites in Turkey.

== Geography ==
The mosque is situated in the Hacı Bayram Veli Street of Ankara. There are parks and tombs around Haji Bayram Mosque. The Mosque is accessible by city bus and metro. The mosque is next to the Temple of Augustus.

== See also ==
- Haji Bektash Veli Complex
- Haji Bayram Veli
