= Jelveti order =

Sufi order in Sunni Islam

The Jelveti order (also spelled Celvetîyye) is a Sufi order (tariqa) within Sunni Islam, founded by Aziz Mahmud Hudayi.

The Jelveti order did not spread as widely as some other Sufi paths and remained primarily within the borders of modern Turkey, though it maintained several tekkes in the Balkans. Notable Jelveti sheikhs include Bursalı İsmail Hakkı of Bursa, Osman Fazlı, and Mustafa Devati. In Ottoman Bosnia, a prominent Jelveti leader was Mustafa Gaibi.

== See also ==
- Khalwati order
