= Aziz Mahmud Hudayi =

Ottoman mystic, poet, composer, author, statesman and Hanafi Maturidi Islamic scholar

Aziz Mahmud Hüdayi (1541–1628), (b. Şereflikoçhisar, d. Üsküdar) was one of the most renowned Sufi saints of the Ottoman Empire. A mystic, poet, composer, and influential Hanafi-Maturidi scholar, he served as a spiritual advisor to several sultans. while popular tradition often links him to the Ottoman imperial family, he is most celebrated as the founder of the Jelveti Sufi Order.

== Life ==
Born in Central Anatolia, Aziz Mahmud Hudayi Hazretleri completed his studies in a medrese in Istanbul. He became the Sheikh of Sultan Ahmed I who constructed the famous Blue Mosque and so read the first Friday prayer there on its opening. He was also especially respected by Sultan Murad III. He is a descendant of Junayd of Baghdad, and, as a descendant of Husayn ibn 'Ali, can be called a sayyid.

Mehmed Muhyiddin Üftâde is the most renowned and significant Sufi master of Hüdayi. Üftade was Hüdayi's spiritual guide and mentor throughout his life. Hüdayi spent many years in his company, completed his spiritual training, and adopted the pen name "Hüdayi".

Additionally, it is known that during the time he spent in Damascus and Egypt with his teacher Nâzırzâde Ramazan Efendi, he also received Sufi instruction from a Khalwati master named Kerimuddin al-Khalwati. However, the influence of Üftade was far more dominant and foundational in shaping Hüdayi's spiritual identity and the development of his own path.

He founded the Jelveti (Turkish: Celveti) order of sufis and served as a qadi (Islamic judge, kadı in Turkish) in Edirne, Egypt, Damascus, and Bursa. A murid (disciple) and khalifah (successor) of Üftade of Bursa, he wrote about thirty works, seven of them in Turkish. Mustafa Gaibi, a prominent sufi from Ottoman Bosnia, was one of his disciples.

His supplication prompted many sailors of the Ottoman Navy to visit his grave before going out to sea:

Those who visit us when we are alive, and those who visit our grave after our death and read the Fatiha when passing by our tomb are ours. May those who love us not drown at sea, may they not suffer poverty in their old age, and may they not pass away without saving their faith.

He died in Üsküdar, Istanbul and was buried on a site which is now enclosed within a mosque complex that remains a site of pilgrimage and devotion. By 1855 it was in ruins but was restored and expanded by Sultan Abdülmecid I.

The small stone house in which he lived is a few miles away from the complex. The 19th-century Üsküdar-born artist Hoca Ali Riza painted a watercolour of the house standing alone in what was then countryside. A foundation named after him now maintains the house which has become the Çilehane Mescidi overlooked by the large new Çilehane Mosque.

== Four Patron Saints of the Bosphorus ==
Along with Yahya Efendi, Telli Baba, and Yuşa (Joshua), Aziz Mahmud Hudayi is considered to be one of the Four Patron Saints of the Bosphorus.

== See also ==
- Mustafa Devati, a successor
