= Haji Bayram Veli =

Grand Sheikh of Bayramiyya (1352–1430)

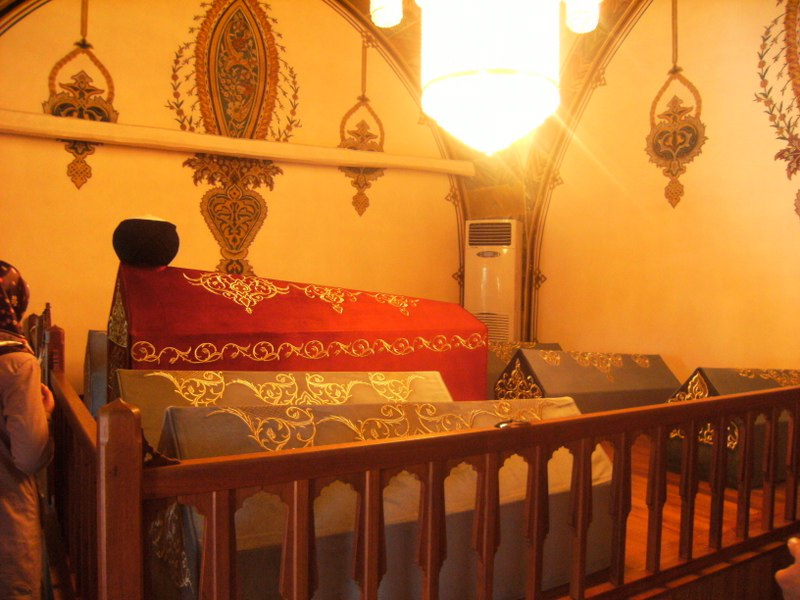
- The cenotaph of Haji Bayram Veli

Personal life
- Born: 1352 CE Solfasol Village, Ankara
- Died: 1430 (aged 77–78) Ulus, Ottoman Empire
- Resting place: Haji Bayram Mosque, Ulus, Ankara, Turkey
- Era: Medieval
- Region: Anatolia

Religious life
- Religion: Islam
- Denomination: Sunni
- Jurisprudence: Hanafi
- Tariqa: Bayrami
- Creed: Maturidi

Muslim leader
- Influenced by: Somunju Baba
- Influenced: Akshamsaddin

Haji Bayram Veli (Turkish: Hacı Bayram-ı Veli) (1352–1430) was an Ottoman Turkish poet, Sufi saint, and the founder of the Bayramiyya order. He also composed a number of hymns. He was a follower of the Hanafi school in jurisprudence and a follower of the Maturidi aqidah in theology. Haji Bayram Veli is considered by all Sufi tariqa to be a Qutb or Ghous, which is the greatest rank a wali can achieve.

== Biography ==
=== Early life ===
He lived between 1352 and 1430. His original name was Numan, he changed it to Bayram after he met his spiritual leader Somunju Baba during the festival of Eid ul-Adha (Turkish: Kurban Bayramı).

=== Foundation and spread of Bayrami Order ===
The two mystics, Somunju Baba (Turkish: Şeyh Hamid-i Veli) and Haji Bayram, were living in the city of Bursa when they made the Hajj together. During this journey Somunju Baba continued to teach Sufism. Somunju Baba died in 1412 passing his authority to Haji Bayram Veli, who returned to Ankara as the sheikh of a Sufi tariqa called Bayrami. He built a dervish lodge on the site in Ankara where his tomb and mosque stand today. People came to stay there and learn about Sufism. The Bayramiyya order grew popular with Bayram's successful teaching.

The growth of the order perturbed some local authorities; they shared their worries with the Ottoman Sultan Murad II, who called Haji Bayram to Edirne, then capital of the Ottoman Empire. Sultan Murad II wanted to test the opinions, doctrine and the patriotism of the order. At this time in Anatolia there were many independent Turkish clans with little unity among them.

Haji Bayram took another scholar, his murid Akshamsaddin (Turkish: Akşemseddin), with him to Edirne to meet the Sultan. Murad soon understood that the complaints against Bayram were merely rumours and Haji Bayram and Akshamsaddin stayed for a while in Edirne, lecturing and preaching to the Ottoman court. He had more private consultations with the Sultan in which they discussed matters of the world, life and the future.

In particular the Sultan was concerned with the conquest of Constantinople, the Byzantine capital that the previous armies of Islam had struggled to conquer without success. The Sultan asked Bayram directly, "Who will conquer the city?" The reply came: "You will not. But this baby shall. You and I will not be alive at the time of that conquest. But my student Akshamsaddin will be there." The baby was the Sultan's son, the future Mehmed II, who would conquer the city which later became known as Istanbul in 1453 and receive the title "the Conqueror" (Turkish: Fatih) becoming known as Mehmed the Conqueror.

Haji Bayram requested that his student Akshamsaddin be the teacher of the baby Mehmed, and Sultan Murad II agreed. Haji Bayram made a few more trips to Edirne until he died in 1430 in Ankara, passing the leadership of his order to Akshamsaddin.

His tomb and the mosque, next to the Temple of Augustus (Res Gestae Divi Augusti), dedicated to him are in Ankara.

== Legacy ==
Ankara Hacı Bayram Veli University and Haji Bayram Mosque were named after him.

== See also ==
- List of Sufis
- Bayramiyya
- Khalwatiyya
- Zahediyya
