= List of Sufi orders =

Sufi orders (Arabic: طرق صوفية ṭuruq ṣūfiyya, singular: طريقة ṭarīqa) are organized spiritual lineages within the Islamic mystical tradition of Sufism. Each order traces its teachings through a chain of transmission (silsila) leading back through early Muslim ascetics to companions of the prophet Muhammad — mainly Abu Bakr and Ali ibn Abi Talib — and ultimately to Muhammad himself. While Sufi practice originated in the ascetic circles in 2nd–3rd centuries AH, formalized Sufi orders with defined institutional structures appeared gradually between the 5th and 7th centuries AH.

Sufi orders developed distinct devotional practices, liturgical forms such as dhikr, rules of spiritual training, and regional identities. Over time, they spread across the Middle East, Persia, Central Asia, South Asia, North Africa, Sub-Saharan Africa, Anatolia, and the Balkans, forming some of the most influential religious and social networks in Muslim societies. This article lists major Sufi orders arranged by historical period, geography, and recognized sub-branches.

== Historical background ==
The origins of Sufism lie in early Islamic asceticism (zuhd) and spiritual teaching circles active in the 2nd–4th centuries AH (8th–10th centuries CE). Early figures such as Hasan al-Basri, Rabia Basri, Sahl al-Tustari, Junayd of Baghdad, and Bayazid Bastami articulated the vocabulary, ethical ideals, and metaphysical concepts that shaped later Sufi thought, though they did not establish "orders" in an institutional sense.

By the 5th–6th centuries AH, Sufi authors such as al-Qushayri and al-Hujwīrī systematized Sufi doctrine, and khānaqāhs, ribāṭs, and zawiyas emerged as centers for spiritual instruction. During this period, recognizable orders began to develop around charismatic teachers, such as ʿAbd al-Qādir al-Jīlānī (Qādiriyya), Abū al-Najīb al-Suhrawardī (Suhrawardiyya), and Ahmad Yasavī (Yasaviyya).

Between the 7th and 10th centuries AH, Sufi orders expanded widely through missionary activity, trade networks, and royal patronage, producing transregional movements such as the Naqshbandiyya, Shādhiliyya, Chishtiyya, and Khalwatiyya. In the 12th–14th centuries AH, new orders such as the Tijaniyya, Sanūsiyya, Darqāwiyya, and ‘Alawiyya appeared, often responding to colonialism, reformist debates, and social developments.

== Early influential Sufis (before the emergence of orders) ==
The following figures predate institutional Sufi orders but are considered foundational influences:

- Hasan al-Basri (d. 110 AH / 728 CE)
- Rābiʻah al-ʻAdawiyya (d. 185 AH / 801 CE)
- Sahl al-Tustarī (d. 283 AH / 896 CE)
- Junayd al-Baghdādī (d. 298 AH / 910 CE)
- Abū Yazīd al-Bistāmī (d. 261 AH / 874 CE)
- al-Hārith al-Muḥāsibī (d. 243 AH / 857 CE)
- Abū ʿAbd al-Raḥmān al-Sulamī (d. 412 AH / 1021 CE)
- al-Qushayrī (d. 465 AH / 1072 CE)
- Abū Ismāʿīl al-Harawī (d. 481 AH / 1089 CE)
- al-Ghazālī (d. 505 AH / 1111 CE)

== Sufi orders by period of foundation ==
Sufi Order	Founder	Period (CE / AH)	Region of Origin
Qadiriyya	Abd al-Qadir al-Jilani	d. 1166 / 561 AH	Baghdad
Rifa'i	Ahmad al-Rifa'i	d. 1182 / 578 AH	Iraq
Chishtiyya	Mu'in al-Din Chishti	d. 1236 / 633 AH	India (Ajmer)
Suhrawardiyya	Abu al-Najib al-Suhrawardi	d. 1168 / 563 AH	Baghdad
Kubrawiyya	Najm al-Din Kubra	d. 1221 / 618 AH	Khwarazm
Naqshbandiyya	Baha' al-Din Naqshband	d. 1389 / 791 AH	Bukhara
Mujaddidiyya	Ahmad Sirhindi	d. 1624 / 1029 AH	India (Sirhind)
Shadhiliyya	Abu al-Hasan al-Shadhili	d. 1258 / 656 AH	North Africa
Khalwatiyya	Umar al-Khalwati (trad.)	14th–15th c.	Anatolia
Yasaviyya	Ahmad Yasavi	d. 1166 / 562 AH	Turkestan
Mevlevi	Jalaluddin Rumi	d. 1273	Turkey
Bektashiyya	Haji Bektash Wali	d. 1271 / 669 AH (trad.)	Turkey

== Sufi orders by region ==
Region	Major Orders
Middle East	Qadiriyya, Suhrawardiyya, Rifa'i, Shadhiliyya (Egypt branches)
Central Asia	Naqshbandiyya, Kubrawiyya, Yasaviyya
South Asia	Chishtiyya, Qadiriyya (Indian branches), Suhrawardiyya (Indian branches), Mujaddidiyya
North Africa (Maghreb)	Shadhiliyya, Darqawiyya, Alawiyya, Tijaniyya
Anatolia & Balkans	Bektashiyya, Khalwatiyya, Mevleviyya
Sub-Saharan Africa	Qadiriyya (West Africa), Tijaniyya, Muridiyya
Iran & Persianate areas	Nimatullahi, Kubrawiyya, Safaviyya (pre-dynastic)
Caucasus	Naqshbandiyya-Khalidiyya, Qadiriyya (local Caucasian branches)

== Major branches and sub-orders ==
Major Order	Branch	Branch Founder	Region	Other Offshoots
Qadiriyya	Qadiri-Barkati	Shah Barkatullah Marehrawi	India, Pakistan	Razawiyyah (Barelvi)
Qadiriyya	Qadiri-Mukhtari	Shaykh Mukhtar al-Kunti	West Africa (Mali)	
Naqshbandiyya	Naqshbandiyya-Mujaddidiyya	Ahmad Sirhindi	India / Central Asia	Saifia
Naqshbandiyya	Naqshbandiyya-Khalidiyya	Shaykh Khalid al-Baghdadi	Ottoman Empire / Levant / Anatolia	
Naqshbandiyya	Naqshbandiyya-Abul Ulai	Ameer Abul Ula	India	
Shadhiliyya	Darqawiyya	Muhammad al-Arabi al-Darqawi	Morocco (Maghreb)	Sanusiyyah
Shadhiliyya	Wafa'iyya	Muhammad b. Ahmad Wafa	Syria, Egypt	
Shadhiliyya	Dasuqiya-Burhaniya	Ibrahim al-Dasuqi	Egypt	
Shadhiliyya	Zarruqiyya	Ahmad az-Zarruq	Morocco	
Shadhiliyya	Arūsiyya	Ahmad b. al-'Arüs	---	
Chishtiyya	Chishtiyya-Nizamiyya	Nizamuddin Auliya	Delhi / North India	
Chishtiyya	Chishtiyya-Sabiriyya	Ala al-Din Sabir Kalyari	India (Subcontinent)	
Chishtiyya	Chishtiyya-Khizriya	Khizr Rumi Qalandar	India	
Suhrawardiyya	Makhdumiyya	Sayyid Jalal ad-Din al-Bukhari (Jahaniyan Jahangasht)	India, Pakistan	
Suhrawardiyya	Zayniyya	Zayn ad-din Abu Bakr Khwafi	Iran	
Suhrawardiyya	Jalāli	Syed Jalaluddin Surkh-Posh Bukhari	India (subcontinent)	
Suhrawardiyya	Ziya'iyya	Ziya al-Din Nakhshabi	India / Persia	
Kubrawiyya	Firdawsiyya	Badr ad-Din Firdawsi	(Eastern) India, Bangladesh	
Kubrawiyya	Ashrafiyya	Ashraf Jahangir as-Simnāni	India	
Kubrawiyya	Ya'qubiyah	Shaykh Yaqub Sarfi Kashmiri	India	
Kubrawiyya	Hamadhaniyya	Sayf al-Din al-Hamadhani	Khorasan / Persia	
Rifa'i	Badawiyyah	Ahmad al-Badawi	North Africa	
Rifa'i	Alwaniyya	Ahmad ibn 'Alwan	Yemen	
Madyaniyya	Ba 'Alawiyya	al-Faqih al-Muqaddam Muhammad ibn Ali Ba 'Alawi	Hadhramaut	
Madyaniyya	Amoudiyya	Sa'eed ibn Isa al-Amoudi	Hadhramaut	
Madyaniyya	Hazmiriyya	Abd ar-Rahman al-Hazmir	--	
Madyaniyya	Hahiya	Yahya b.'Abd al-'Azīz al-Hahi	--	
Madyaniyya	Hansaliyya	Sa'id ibn Yusuf	--	
Yasawiyyah	Bektashiyya	Haji Bektash Veli	Turkey	
Yasawiyyah	Zahediyya	Zahed Gilani	-	
Yasawiyyah	Khalwati	Umar al-Khalwati	Middle East, Turkey, Balkans	
Yasawiyyah	Bayramiye	Haji Bayram Veli	-	
Yasawiyyah	Jilvatiyya (Jelveti)	Aziz Mahmud Hudayi		

== Timeline of major Sufi orders ==
Order	Founder / Key Figure	Date (AH)	Date (CE)	Region of Origin
Qādiriyya	ʿAbd al-Qādir al-Jīlānī	561	1166	Iraq
Suhrawardiyya	Abū al-Najīb al-Suhrawardī	563	1168	Persia / Iraq
Yasaviyya	Ahmad Yasavī	562	1166	Turkestan
Rifāʿiyya	Aḥmad al-Rifāʿī	578	1182	Iraq
Kubrawiyya	Najm al-Dīn Kubrā	618	1221	Khwarazm
Chishtiyya	Muʿin al-Dīn Chishtī	636	1238	South Asia
Shādhiliyya	Abū al-Ḥasan al-Shādhilī	656	1258	Egypt / Maghrib
Bektāshiyya	Hacı Bektaş Veli	669	1271	Anatolia
Mawlawiyya	Jalāl al-Dīn Rūmī	672	1273	Anatolia
Naqshbandiyya	Bahā’ al-Dīn Naqshband	791	1389	Central Asia
Khalwatiyya	Various (formalized later)	800s	1400s CE	Persia / Anatolia
Mujaddidiyya	Ahmad Sirhindī	1029	1624	North India
Tijaniyya	Aḥmad al-Tijānī	1230	1815	North/West Africa
Sanūsiyya	Muḥammad ibn ʿAlī al-Sanūsī	1276	1859	Libya
Darqāwiyya	Muḥammad al-Darqāwī	1239	1823	Morocco

== Other Sufi Orders ==
Letter	Sufi Order
G	Galibi Order
H	Hamallayya
H	Hansaliyya
I	Idrisiyya
I	Isawiyya (Aissawa, Issawiyya)
J	Jahriyya
J	Jilala
K	Karzaziyya
K	Karkariya
K	Gulshani
K	Jerrahi
K	Nur Ashki Jerrahi
K	Nasuhi
K	Rahmani
K	Sunbuli
K	Ussaki
K	Khatmiyya
K	Marufi
M	Madariyya
M	Maizbhandaria
M	Malamatiyya
M	Maryamiyya
M	Mouride (Murid tariqa, Muridiyya, Yoonu Murit)
M	Murīdūn
N	Haqqaniyya
N	İsmailağa
N	Saifia
N	Süleymancılar
N	Nasiriyya
N	Nimatullahi
N	Noorbakshia
Q	Kasnazani
Q	Sarwari Qadiri
Q	Qudusiyah
R	Rahmani (Rahmaniyya)
R	Rishi order
S	Murabitun
S	Shattariyya
S	Sammaniyya
T	Tijaniyyah (also Tijani)
U	Uwaisi
Z	Zahabiya

== Other Sufi groups ==
- Akbariyya
- Azeemiyya
- Bayramiye (al Bayramiyya)
- Bawa Muhaiyaddeen Fellowship
- Cem Foundation (Bektashi)
- Dasuqi (Desuqiyya)
- Fultali
- Haji Bektash Veli Anatolian Cultural Association (Bektashi)
- Hurufiyya
- International Association of Sufism
- Jaririya
- Jelveti (Jalwatiyya, Celvetîyye)
- Khufiyya
- Khwajagan
- Layene
- Roshani movement
- Salihiyya

== Unorthodox Sufi groups ==
- Adawiyya (Yazidism)
- Alevism (Shia)
- Alians (Shia)
- Al Akbariyya
- Baba Samid (Shia)
- Bektashism
- Dar-ul-Ehsan
- Haqqani Anjuman
- Inayati Order
- International Spiritual Movement Anjuman Serfaroshan-e-Islam
- Moorish Science Temple of America
- Qalandariyya
- Subud
- Sufi Ruhaniat International
- The Idries Shah Foundation
- The Chisholme Institute (The Beshara School of Esoteric Education)
- Western Sufism
  - International Sufi Centre
  - Sufi Contact
  - Sufism Reoriented
  - The Sufi Way

== See also ==
- List of Sufis
