= Manuel Komnenos Raoul =

Manuel Komnenos Raoul (Greek: Μανουήλ Κομνηνός Ῥαούλ; fl. ca. 1258–80) was a Byzantine aristocrat and official.

A member of the aristocratic Raoul/Rales family, Raoul was a son of the protovestiarios Alexios Raoul. His father was a senior military leader under the Nicaean emperor John III Vatatzes (r. 1222–1254), but fell out of favour with his successor, Theodore II Laskaris (r. 1254–1258), who distrusted the aristocracy and promoted men of humble origin like George Mouzalon, who became his chief minister. Theodore II's marrying one of Raoul's sisters to George's brother, Andronikos Mouzalon, was regarded as an insult, and the family became opponents of the emperor, who at some point had all of Alexios' sons thrown into prison. As a result, the Raoul family actively supported the murder of the Mouzalon brothers in 1258, following Theodore II's death, and the subsequent usurpation of Michael VIII Palaiologos (r. 1259–1282).

As a reward, Michael VIII appointed Alexios' eldest son, John Raoul Petraliphas, as protovestiarios, while Raoul was made pinkernes. In 1276, Raoul was appointed governor in Thessaly. Shortly after, however, Raoul and his brother Isaac became opposed to the emperor's efforts to secure the Union of the Churches and supported the anti-unionist Patriarch Arsenios Autoreianos. As a result, Raoul was arrested in 1279, and in 1280 he was blinded and exiled to Kenchreai on the Skamandros River.

== Sources ==
- Kazhdan, Alexander, ed. (1991). The Oxford Dictionary of Byzantium. Oxford and New York: Oxford University Press. ISBN 0-19-504652-8.
- Macrides, Ruth (2007). George Akropolites: The History – Introduction, Translation and Commentary. Oxford: Oxford University Press. ISBN 978-0-19-921067-1.
- Trapp, Erich; Beyer, Hans-Veit; Walther, Rainer; Sturm-Schnabl, Katja; Kislinger, Ewald; Leontiadis, Ioannis; Kaplaneres, Sokrates (1976–1996). Prosopographisches Lexikon der Palaiologenzeit (in German). Vienna: Verlag der Österreichischen Akademie der Wissenschaften. ISBN 3-7001-3003-1.
