= Hayreddin Tokadi =

Ottoman Islamic scholar

Hayreddin Tokadi or Tokadi Hayreddin (b. Konuralp – d. 1525/1530, Bolu), an Ottoman Islamic scholar (alim) and saint (wali) of the widespread Khalwati Sufi order (tariqa) buried in Bolu.

Hayreddin Efendi was brought up next to Cemâl-i Halveti (Cemaleddin), known as Çelebi Khalifa, the leader of the Cemâliyye branch, one of the four main branches of the Khalwati tariqa. He joined him while he was in Tokat, continued his studies in Amasya, and went to Istanbul on the orders of his mentor (murshid). Sultan Bayezid II met Hayreddin-i Tokadi when he was governor of Amasya, and after he became sultan he met with him at the Sümbül Efendi (a successor of Çelebi Khalifa Cemaleddin) dergah in Istanbul where he entered seclusion. Hayreddin-i Tokadi continued his guidance (irshad) activities in Bolu and Düzce Pazar and was the mentor of Shaban Wali, the founder of Halvetiyye-Şâbâniyye order. In addition to him, he trained caliphs such as Muslihuddin-i Konrapavi and Mahmud-i Kürevi.

== Name mixup ==
The first authors to mention Hayreddin Effendi are Nev'îzâde Atâî (Zeyl-i Şekāik, p. 62), Şeyhî Mehmed Efendi (Vekāyiu'l-Fuzalâ, p. 51), and İbrâhim Hâs (Şabaniyya Silsilesi, p. 65) and they state he was from Konrapa, a town in Bolu Province in Ottoman times, present-day Konuralp in Düzce Province. Omer Fuadi, the contemporary of Atai and a Halveti-Shabani sheikh, stated that Hayreddin was active in Bolu without giving any information about his place of birth. In later sources such as Tomar-Halvetiyye (pp. 57, 62–63) and Sefîne-i Evliyâ (III, pp. 512–513) and in studies based on these, evidence suggests Hayreddin Efendi was thought of being from Tokat because he was confused with another Halveti sheikh of the same name mentioned in Cemaleddin Hulvî's Lemezât (v. 280b - 281a).

Hayreddin Efendi of Tokad, whom Hulvî met in Bursa in 1008 AH (1599-1600 AD), became a follower of Shaban Efendi of Kastamonu (Şaban-ı Veli) who in turn was one of the caliphs (successors) of Hayreddin Efendi of Konrapa. On the other hand, Hayreddin Efendi of Tokad was engaged in irshad activity in Bursa. He died in 1018 (1609) and was buried in Bursa (ibid).

== Legacy ==
A Halveti-Shabani sheikh, Ibrahim Has, states that Hayreddin Efendi died in 931 (1525), was buried in a place called Dutaş in Bolu, and says that his grave is among the great pilgrimage sites. The estimated date of Shaban Wali becoming a disciple of Hayreddin Efendi in Bolu is 925 (1519) and he was sent to Kastamonu as a caliph after serving him for twelve years. In this case, it follows that Hayreddin Efendi died in 937 (1530).

The tomb (türbe) of Hayreddin Tokadi lies in his dergah at a distance of 13 km from Bolu city center, close to Lake Abant exit of TEM highway midway between Istanbul and Ankara. Annual commemoration ceremonies are held here with a wide participation in the summer season.
