= Byzantine mints =

Mints established by the Byzantine Empire

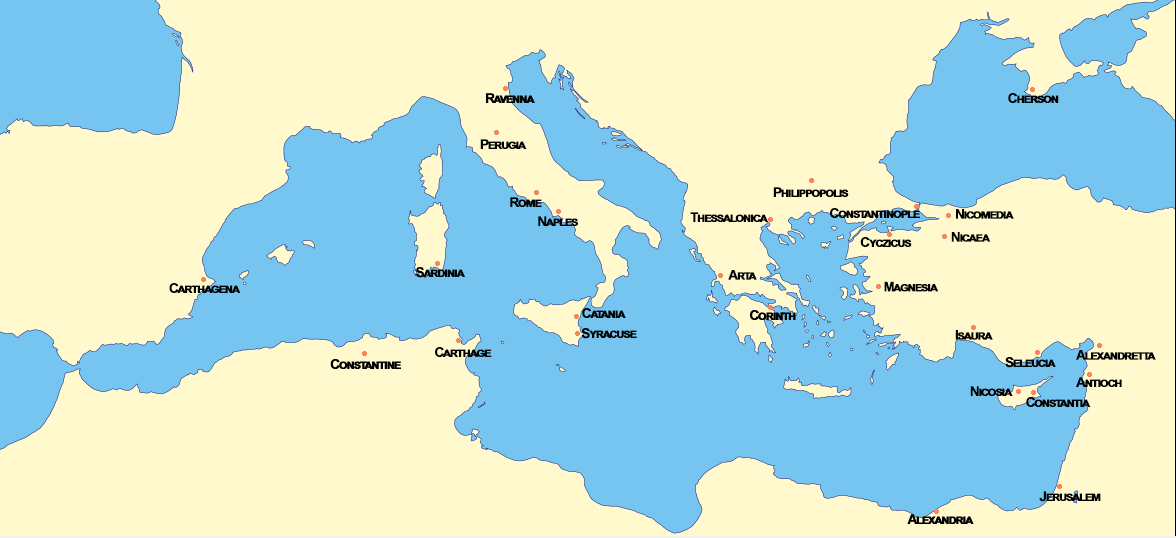
Byzantine mints at the time of Justinian I (mid-6th century)

The East Roman or Byzantine Empire established and operated several mints throughout its history (330–1453). Aside from the main metropolitan mint in the capital, Constantinople, a varying number of provincial mints were also established in other urban centres, especially during the 6th century. Most provincial mints except for Syracuse were closed or lost to invasions by the mid-7th century. After the loss of Syracuse in 878, Constantinople became the sole mint for gold and silver coinage until the late 11th century, when major provincial mints began to re-appear. Many mints, both imperial and, as the Byzantine world fragmented, belonging to autonomous local rulers, were operated in the 12th to 14th centuries. Constantinople and Trebizond, the seat of the independent Empire of Trebizond (1204–1461), survived until their conquest by the Ottoman Turks in the mid-15th century.

== History ==
The original Roman mint network was reorganized and centralized by Emperor Diocletian (r. 284–305– ) at the end of the 3rd century, parallel to the restructuring of the Roman Empire's provincial and fiscal administration. The mints were limited to one per diocese (except for a few exceptions) and placed under the dual control of the praetorian prefectures and the comes sacrarum largitionum. During the next two centuries, some mints were closed and others opened as fiscal necessity or administrative changes dictated. In addition, the various emperors had mints attached to their retinue (comitatus) which followed them on their journeys and campaigns throughout the Roman Empire. After a law promulgated in 366/369, the minting of precious-metal coins was confined to these comitatensian mints, operating either from a permanent base or by making use of the regional mints nearest to the current location of the emperor and his comitatus. Otherwise, regional mints were mostly limited to issuing base-metal coins.

During the course of the 5th century, the Roman minting system collapsed. The western half of the Roman Empire was overrun by Germanic tribes, although some mints remained active in the West under the new barbarian rulers and continued to mint coins, including high-quality gold solidi, in the name of the eastern emperors, most notably in Ostrogothic Italy and Burgundy. In the East, most mints seem to have been active until some time into the reign of Zeno (r. 475–491– ), but by the accession of Anastasius I (r. 491–518– ) only the mints of Constantinople and Thessalonica remained active. In 498, Anastasius initiated a major coinage reform—carried out by the comes sacrarum largitionum John the Paphlagonian—which is held to mark the start of the "Byzantine" coinage system proper. At the same time, he re-opened the mints at Nicomedia and later at Antioch. The number of mints expanded greatly during the reign of Justinian I (r. 527–565– ), in large part due to his reconquest of Italy, Africa, and parts of Spain. As many as fourteen mints were active during Justinian's reign, with new mints opened or taken over from the Vandals and Ostrogoths in Carthage, Rome, Ravenna, Carthagena, and in smaller provincial centres. Most of these were confined to copper coinage. Ravenna and Carthage alone produced silver coins in quantity, while gold issues were restricted to Catania, Thessalonica, and Constantinople; the latter two cities, however, far outstripped the others in output.

The territorial losses of the early 7th century, with the Byzantine–Sassanid War of 602–628, the Slavic incursions into the Balkans, and the onset of the Muslim conquests, drastically diminished the number of active mints. In 628/629, Emperor Heraclius (r. 610–641– ) closed all remaining provincial mints in the East except for Alexandria, which fell to the Arabs in 641. In the West too, one by one the cities hosting the various mints fell to various enemies, until by the 9th century, only Syracuse remained.

With the fall of Syracuse in 878, Constantinople remained the sole mint for gold and silver coinage until the late 11th century. The provincial mint at Cherson was reopened c. 860, but its output was restricted to copper coinage. Thessalonica became the main provincial mint after it reopened in the second half of the 11th century, and other provincial centres—Thebes or Corinth in southern Greece, Philadelphia in the 14th century, Magnesia and Nicaea during the Empire of Nicaea (1204–1261)—were active at times during the Byzantine Empire's last centuries. Usurpers or semi-autonomous local lords also occasionally established mints of their own, like Isaac Komnenos of Cyprus, Leo Gabalas of Rhodes, or the Gabras family of Trebizond. Constantinople, however, remained the main mint, providing the bulk of the coinage.

== List (principal mints in bold) ==
Location	Attested activity	Mint mark	Comments
Adrianople	1354–1356		Active as a mint for the co-emperor Matthew Kantakouzenos during his rule over Thrace (1347–1357). Didymoteichon is an alternative site.
Alexandretta	609–610	ΑΛΕΞΑΝΔ	Active during Heraclius's (r. 610–641– ) revolt against Phocas (r. 602–610– ).
**Alexandria**	Before 330 to after 475, c. 525–646	ΑΛΕΞ, ΑΛΞΟΒ	Active from before Diocletian (r. 284–305– ) to the reign of Zeno (r. 475–491– ) as the mint of the Diocese of Egypt. Re-established c. 525, active until its fall to the Arabs in 642. Briefly struck coinage during the short-lived Byzantine reconquest of the city in 645-646.
**Antioch**	Before 330 to after 475, c. 512–610	ΑΝ, ΑΝΤΙΚ, ΑΝΤΧ; THUP, THEUP, THEUPO, ΘVΠOΛS	Active from before Diocletian (r. 284–305– ) to the reign of Zeno (r. 475–491– ) as the mint of the Diocese of the East. Re-established by Anastasius I (r. 491–518– ). Renamed to Theoupolis (Greek: Θεούπολις, "City of God") after the 526 earthquake. No coins are attested after 610, its establishment having probably been transferred to Jerusalemanti (see below).
Arta	c. 1204–1271		Main mint for the Despotate of Epirus. Attribution is conjectural but probable, as Arta was the capital of Epirus.
**Carthage**	533 – c. 695	CAR, KAR, KART, CT, CRTG, KRTG	Established by Diocletian (r. 284–305– ) c. 296 but suppressed in 307 and its staff transferred to Ostia. A new mint was established by the Vandals there, and was taken over by the Byzantines in 533. Struck a distinct style of compact, globular solidi from 610-695. Extant until c. 695, when it was moved to Sardinia before the threat of Arab conquest.
Carthagena	c. 560–624		Active in southern Spain until the fall of the last Byzantine strongholds to the Visigoths in c. 624.
Catania	c. 582–629	CAT	Established in 582/583 and last coinage attested in 628/629.
Cherson	6th century, late 9th – early 11th centuries	ΧΕΡCWΝΟC, ΧΕΡCΟΝΟC,	Active under Justinian I (r. 527–565– ), Maurice (r. 582–602– ), and from the reign of Basil I (r. 867–886– ) to Basil II (r. 976–1025– ).
Constantia in Cyprus	610 and c. 626–629	ΚΥΠΡΟV, ΚΥΠΡΕ, KYΠΡ, CΠΡ	Active during Heraclius's revolt and again in 626–629, chiefly to cover military needs.
Constantina in Numidia	540/541–592/593	CON	Only sporadically active, attribution now generally dismissed.
**Constantinople**	330–1204, 1261–1453	CON, CONOB, CONOS, COB	Main mint throughout the Byzantine era, except for the period where it functioned as the mint of the Latin Empire (1204–1261).
Cyzicus	518–629	KYZ, KY	Active since before Diocletian (r. 284–305– ), who made it the mint for the Diocese of Asia. Re-established by Anastasius I (r. 491–518– ), it remained active until 629/630, with an interruption in 614/615–625/626 due to the war with Sassanid Persia.
Isaura	617/618–618/619	ISAYR	Established to cover military needs in the war against Sassanid Persia. Transferred from Seleucia in 617, and suppressed soon after, probably due to the Persian advance.
Jerusalem	608–614/615	ΙΠ, ΙΧ, IEΡOCO, XC NIKA	Established in 608/609 during Heraclius's revolt by Phocas loyalists, possibly by transfer of the Antioch mint, and survived until the Sassanid Persians took the city in 614/615.
Magnesia	1214–1261		Main mint and treasury of the Empire of Nicaea after the transfer of the Nicaea mint there.
Naples	After c. 661 to c. 830–840	NE	Active from the reign of Constantine IV (r. 641–685– ), probably after c. 661/662 when it became the seat of a doux, to Theophilos (r. 829–842– ). Effectively outside imperial control as the doux became increasingly independent.
Nicaea	c. 1208–1214		Main mint of the Empire of Nicaea until transferred to Magnesia, probably both because of the proximity to Latin territory in Bithynia and to be closer to the Nicaean emperors' favourite residence, Nymphaion.
Nicomedia	498–627	NIK, NIKO, NIC, NIKM, NIKOMI, NI	Established by Diocletian (r. 284–305– ) c. 294 for the Diocese of Pontus. Active until the late 5th century, reopened by Anastasius I (r. 491–518– ) c. 498 and active until 629/630, with an interruption in 617/618–625/626 due to the war with Sassanid Persia.
Nicosia	1184–1191		Main mint of the usurper Isaac Komnenos. Other mints were also established on the island of Cyprus.
Perugia	552/553	P	Attribution conjectural, now generally dismissed.
Philadelphia	1188–1189, 14th century	ΦΛΔΦ	First coinage during the short-lived usurpation of Theodore Mangaphas in 1188–1189. 13th-century coins bearing the mark ΦΛΔΦ have been attributed to the city, which at the time and until its fall in 1390 was a Byzantine exclave surrounded by Turkish territory.
Philippopolis	1092 and a few years after		Active during the early years of the monetary reforms of Alexios I Komnenos (r. 1081–1118– ). Adrianople has also been suggested as an alternative site.
**Ravenna**	c. 540 to early 8th century	RAV, RA, RAB, RAVEN, RAVENNA	Active from conquest by Belisarius in 540 until the fall of the Exarchate of Ravenna to the Lombard kingdom in 751.
Rhodes	c.1225 to 1307		Active from as early as c. 1225, if not by the end of the 12th century, according to recent archaeological evidence. The earliest issues that have been tentatively dated are two series of anonymous imitative copper coins before the appearance of the eponymous issues of Leo Gabalas at first, and then his brother John Gabalas, both of whom were independent rulers of Rhodes and its nearby islets. The mint was operational throughout this whole period until 1304/7 when the last imperial coinage issues were struck in the reign of Andronikos II with his son and co-emperor Michael IX. From the Hospitaller conquest onwards the mint operated under the island's new lords.
Rome	c. 540 to c. 750	ROM, ROMA, ROMOB,	Theoretically in operation until c. 751, when Rome and the Pope broke away from Byzantine overlordship, but already under effective papal control from the 7th century.
Salona	c. 535 and thereafter		Location probable, but not certain; active only during the reign of Justinian I (r. 527–565– ).
Sardinia	c. 695 to after 717	S	Established, probably at Cagliari, through the transfer of the mint of Carthage in c. 695, it is attested until the reign of Leo III the Isaurian (r. 717–741– ).
Seleucia Isauria	615-617	SELISU, SEL	Established to cover military needs in the war against Sassanid Persia. Transferred to Isaura in 617.
**Syracuse**	After 643/644 to 878	SECILIA, CVΡΑΚΟVCI	Active from c. 643/644 to its fall to the Arabs in 878, sometimes supplemented by Catania. Prior to that, coins struck at Constantinople were transferred to the island where they were marked SC[L].
Thebes	Second half of the 12th century		Attribution is conjectural, it concerns a mint established to mint half-tetartera for the joint themes of Hellas and the Peloponnese. Corinth and Athens are alternative proposed sites. Solidly attested from the reign of Manuel I Komnenos (r. 1143–1180– ) until the first reign of Isaac II Angelos (r. 1185–1195– ), it may have been established as early as c. 1092.
**Thessalonica**	330–629/630, late 11th to mid-14th centuries	TES, ΘΕC, ΘΕS, THESSOB, TESOB, THSOB	Active from before Diocletian (r. 284–305– ), who made it the mint of the Diocese of Moesia. Later, it was the main mint for the Diocese of Macedonia and the praetorian prefecture of Illyricum, until 629/630. Reactivated by Alexios I Komnenos (r. 1081–1118– ). From 1204 to 1224, it was active as the mint of the Latin Kingdom of Thessalonica, from then until the Nicaean conquest in 1246 as the mint of the Empire of Thessalonica. Last identifiable coins are dated to 1369–1387.
Trebizond	Late 11th to mid-12th centuries, c. 1230–1461		Local issue by the Gabras family, semi-independent rulers of Chaldia in the late 11th/early 12th century. From the reign of Andronikos I Megas Komnenos (r. 1222–1235– ) on it was the seat of the mint for the Empire of Trebizond (1204–1461).

== Sources ==
- Grierson, Philip (1982). Byzantine Coins. London: Methuen. ISBN 978-0-416-71360-2.
- Grierson, Philip (1999). Byzantine Coinage (PDF). Washington, DC: Dumbarton Oaks. ISBN 978-0-88402-274-9. Archived from the original (PDF) on 2010-06-13.
- Hendy, Michael F. (1985). Studies in the Byzantine Monetary Economy c. 300–1450. Cambridge: Cambridge University Press. ISBN 0-521-24715-2.
- Hendy, Michael F. (1989). The Economy, Fiscal Administration and Coinage of Byzantium. London: Variorum Reprints. ISBN 0-86078-253-0.
- Kazhdan, Alexander, ed. (1991). The Oxford Dictionary of Byzantium. Oxford and New York: Oxford University Press. ISBN 0-19-504652-8.
- Sear, David R.; Bendall, Simon; O'Hara, Michael Dennis (1987). Byzantine Coins and their Values. London: Seaby. ISBN 9780900652714.
