= Koca Mustafa Pasha Mosque =

Mosque in Istanbul, Turkey

Koca Mustafa Pasha Mosque Koca Mustafa Paşa Camii
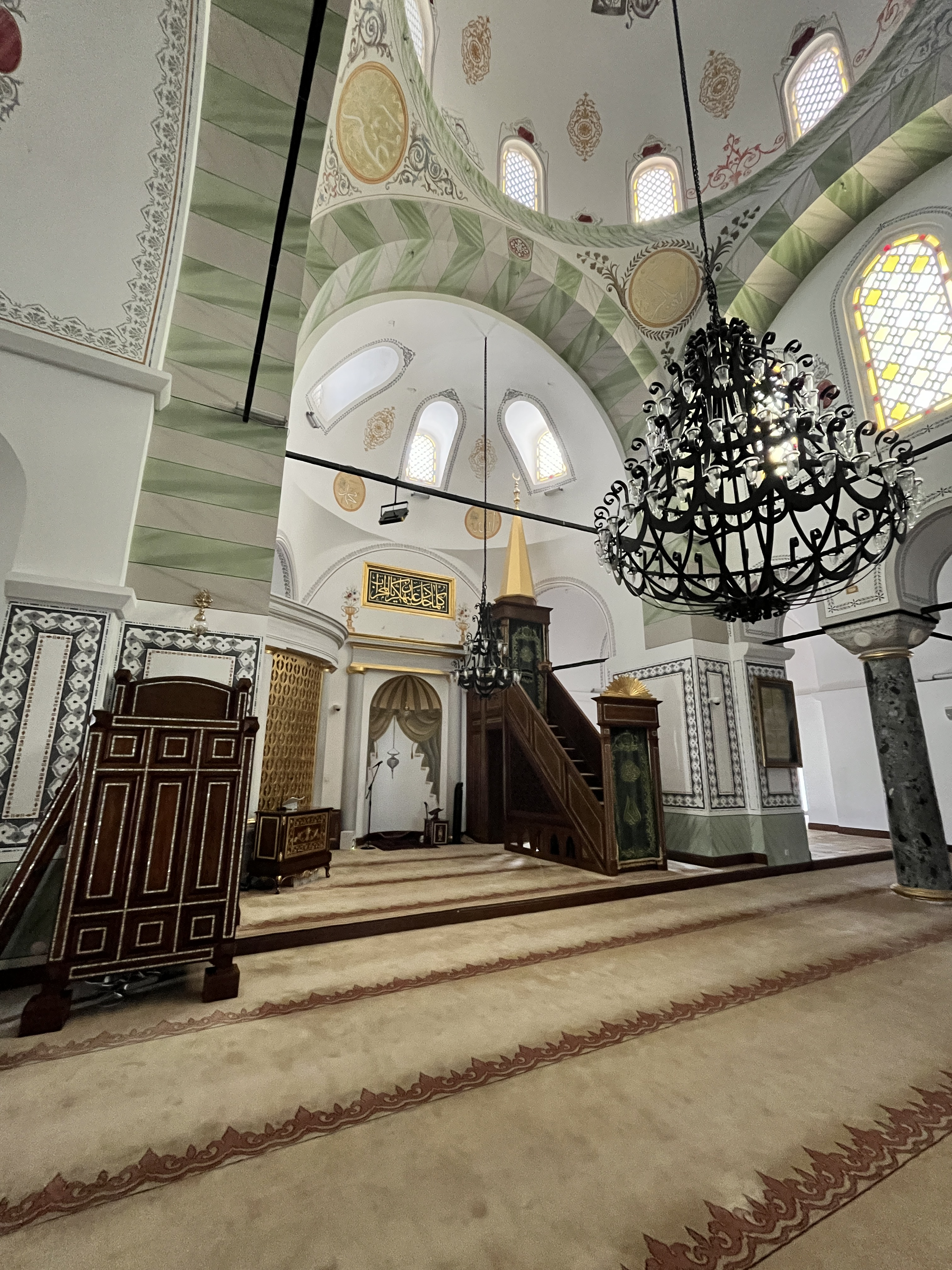
- Interior view

- Location in the Fatih district of Istanbul

Religion
- Affiliation: Sunni Islam
- Patron: Koca Mustafa Pasha
- Year consecrated: Between 1486 and 1491

Location
- Location: Istanbul, Turkey
- Coordinates: 41°00′12.24″N 28°55′42.96″E

Architecture
- Type: church
- Style: Byzantine
- Groundbreaking: 6th century
- Completed: 1284

Specifications
- Direction of façade: west-southwest
- Minaret: 1
- Materials: brick, stone

Koca Mustafa Pasha Mosque (Turkish: Koca Mustafa Paşa Camii; also named Sünbül Efendi Camii) is a former Eastern Orthodox church converted into a mosque by the Ottomans, located in Istanbul, Turkey. The church, as the adjoining monastery, was dedicated to Saint Andrew of Crete, and was named Saint Andrew in Krisei or by-the-Judgment (Greek: Μονὴ τοῦ Ἁγίου Ἀνδρέου ἐν τῇ Κρίσει, Monē tοu Hagiοu Andreοu en tē Krisei). Although heavily transformed during both the Byzantine and the Ottoman eras, it is one of the few extant churches in Istanbul whose foundation goes back to the sixth century.

== Location ==
The building lies in the Istanbul district of Fatih, in the neighborhood of Kocamustafapaşa, along Koca Mustafa Paşa Caddesi. It is placed inside the walled city, and not far from the church of Saint John of Stoudion, on the slopes of the seventh hill of Constantinople near the sea of Marmara.

== History ==
=== Byzantine period ===
At the beginning of the 5th century, Princess Arcadia, sister of Emperor Theodosius II (r. 408–450), ordered the construction, near the Gate of Saturninus, of a monastery dedicated to Saint Andrew. The building, named also Rodophylion (Greek: Ροδοφύλιον) lay about 600 metres (2,000 feet) west of the gate. The monastery was later converted into a nunnery, mentioned for the first time in 792. The monastery of Saint Andrew was known under the appellation "by-the-Judgment", after the place where it lay, named "the Judgment" (ή Κρίσις, hē Krisis). Saint Andrew of Crete, a martyr of the fight against Byzantine Iconoclasm, killed on 20 November 766 in the Forum Bovis because of his opposition to the iconoclastic policies of Emperor Constantine V (r. 741–775), was buried there. Due to his popularity after the final triumph of Orthodoxy, the dedication of the church changed from Saint Andrew the Apostle to him. During the second half of the ninth century, Emperor Basil I (r. 867–886) wholly rebuilt the church, which possibly had been damaged during the iconoclastic fights.

Around 1284, Princess Theodora Raoulaina, niece of Michael VIII Palaiologos (r. 1259–1282) and wife of protovestiarios John Raoul Petraliphas, rebuilt the monastery and the church, deserving the appellation of second ktētorissa. She spent the last fifteen years of her life in the monastery, and was buried there. Neglected during the Latin occupation of Constantinople, two Russian pilgrims visiting Constantinople in 1350 and between 1425 and 1450 mention the church, affirming that Saint Andrew was worshiped by many who were afflicted by sickness. At the beginning of the fifteenth century the surrounding area of the monastery was covered with vineyards, confirming the decline of the city.

=== Ottoman period ===
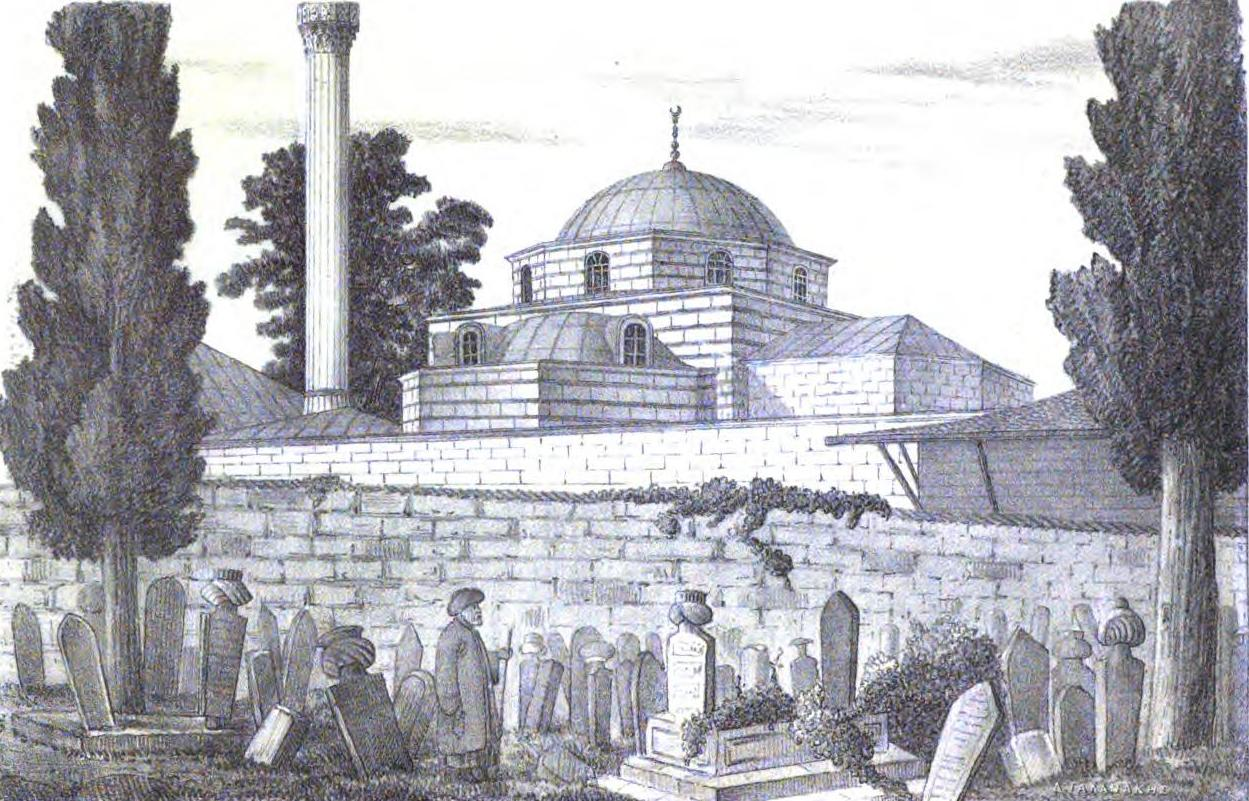
The mosque in a drawing of 1877, from A.G. Paspates' Byzantine topographical studies

After the Ottoman conquest of Constantinople the monastery, known by the Turks as Kızlar Kilisesi ("women's church"), continued to be inhabited for a while. Between 1486 and 1491 Kapicibaşi (and later Grand Vizier) Koca Mustafa Pasha, executed in 1512, converted the church into a mosque. Some years later, the building of the monastery was endowed by his son-in-law, Şeih Çelebi Efendi as Tekke for the Dervishes of the Halveti order. The dervishes were led at that time by the Sufi Master Sünbül Efendi. His türbe, a popular destination for Muslim pilgrims, lies next to the mosque, which is also named after him. At the beginning of the sixteenth century there were quarrels between Sultan Selim I and Şeih Çelebi, since the sultan wanted to pull down part of the monastery to build the Topkapı Palace. He died in 1559 and his wife Safiye Hatun were both buried in a türbe in the yard of the mosque, near the türbe of Mustafa Pasha. Several Halveti Sheiks were buried in the cemetery behind the Mosque.

Also in this period was born the tradition related to a chain hung to a cypress tree. The cypress is since long dead but still stands - together with the chain - inside a small round building in the yard of the mosque. The chain was swung between two people who were affirming contradictory statements, and the chain was said to hit the one who was telling the truth.

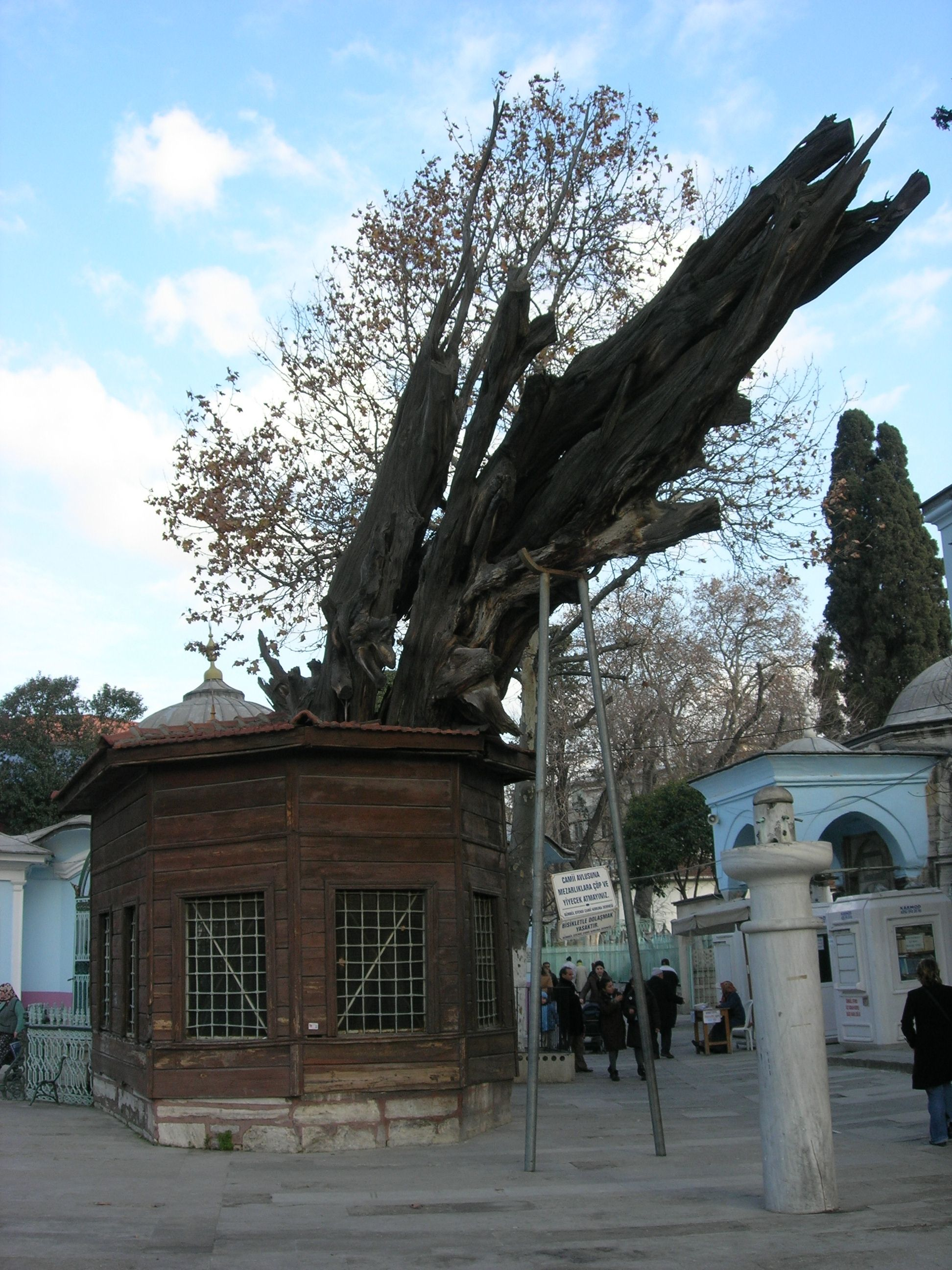
The dead Cypress where the chain once used as "lie detector" (now hidden in the wooden shelter) still hangs. The mosque lies on the right, while in foreground stands a column-shaped fountain. Behind the tree is visible the dome of the türbe of Sünbül Efendi.

This is one among many surviving folk tales concerning the mosque (like those about the çifte Sultanlar, the "twin Sultans"), all with Byzantine roots. They testify the merge between Ottoman and Greek popular culture and beliefs.

At the beginning of the 17th century, Defterdar (treasury minister) Ekmekçizade Ahmet Paşa (d. 1618) let build a Medrese, the gates of the complex, a zaviye, and a mekteb (school). About one century later Hekimbaşı (Sultan's chief physician) Giridli Nuh Efendi (d. 1707) closed the Tekke and enlarged the Medrese, while in 1737 Kızlar Ağası Hacı Beşir Ağa erected in the yard a column-shaped fountain. The earthquake of 1766 destroyed the dome of the building: it was rebuilt in 1768. During the 19th century, Mahmud II (r. 1808-1839) rebuilt the porch. In 1847–1848, Sultan Abdülmecid I (r. 1839–1861) let the wall which encircles the complex be rebuilt. Some years later two fountains were erected in the yard of the mosque. Finally, in 1953, the building was restored again.

The tradition of lighting up the minaret of the mosques on the eve of the anniversary of the birth of Muhammad (Mawlid al-Nabi) was born in the Koca Mustafa Mosque.

== Architecture ==
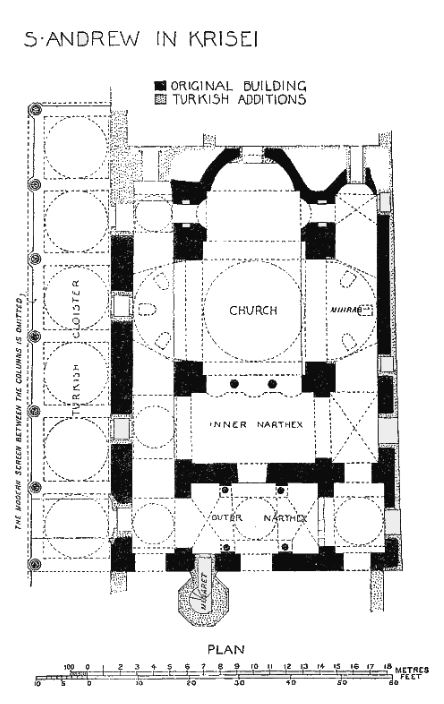
Plan of the mosque, after Van Millingen, Byzantine Churches of Constantinople (1912)

The building was originally of the ambulatory type, and is oriented in east-northeast - west-southwest direction. It has a central dome and a three apses, placed of the east side. An esonarthex and exonarthex are placed in the west side. On the other three sides the dome was originally surrounded by arcades surmounted by barrel vaults. During the Ottoman period the building underwent important alterations. The entrance is on the north side, where the Ottomans built an arcade covered by five domes. After the earthquake of 1766, the central dome was rebuilt. It is circular inside, octagonal outside, and rests on a high drum pierced by eight windows.

On the north and south sides of the main dome, two half domes were added during the Ottoman period. They are also both pierced by three large windows, which outside look like dormers. All the domes rest on arches. The eastern arch sustaining the main dome is prolonged into a barrel vault bema, flanked by niches which originally led to the Prothesis and Diaconicon. Only the diaconicon, covered with a cross-groined vault, survives. The west arch sustaining the dome is filled in with a triple arcade resting on two marble columns topped by cubic capitals.

The inner narthex is divided into three bays. The north one is covered with an Ottoman dome. The central one is surmounted by a barrel vault, while the south one is surmounted by a cross groined vault. The last two are Byzantine.

The outer narthex is divided into five bays, the three central corresponding with those of the inner narthex. The central bay is covered by a central saucer dome resting on pendentives. It is separated by the two intermediate bays by columns set against pilasters. These two bays are covered with groined vaults put on ionic capitals, which resemble those used in the Church of Saints Sergius and Baccus. The two external bays are surmounted by central saucer domes and are separated from the others by projecting pilasters.

The exterior is clearly Ottoman. It is made with finely dressed and polished stone, with no tiles, and has a stone moulded cornice. Above the drum of the halfdomes there is a stone molded cornice. The square base of the drum and the dome itself are faced with polished stone alternating with courses of three bricks set in a thick bed of mortar. Also the dome is crowned with a stone molded cornice. The roof is covered with lead.

The Byzantine monastery has disappeared completely, except for an underground cistern which lies southeast of the mosque. A beautiful Byzantine carved door frame, possibly of the sixth century, belonging to the Medrese, has been brought to the Istanbul Archaeology Museum.

Despite its architectural significance, the building has never undergone a systematic study.
