= John Kantakouzenos (pinkernes) =

John Kantakouzenos (Greek: Ἱωάννης Καντακουζηνός) was a governor of the Thracesian Theme between 1244 and 1249, with the titles of doux and pinkernes. In 1249 he commanded an expedition sent by Emperor John III Vatatzes against the Genoese who had invaded and taken control of Rhodes during the absence of its governor John Gabalas.

Towards the end of his life John Kantakouzenos became a monk, adopting the name Joannikios, and died sometime before 1257.

Donald Nicol provides evidence to support the identification of this John with John Kantakouzenos Komnenos Angelos, who was the husband of Irene Komnene Palaiologina, sister of Michael VIII Palaiologos. Known children of this couple include:

- Theodora, who married (1) George Mouzalon, (2) John Raoul Petraliphas;
- Maria, wife of Constantine Tikh;
- Anna, wife of Nikephoros I Komnenos Doukas;
- Eugenia, wife of Syrgiannes, and was the mother of Syrgiannes Palaiologos; and
- A possible fifth unnamed daughter, who married Theodore Mouzalon.

== Sources ==
- Nicol, Donald M. (1968). The Byzantine Family of Kantakouzenos (Cantacuzenus), ca. 1100–1460: A Genealogical and Prosopographical Study. Dumbarton Oaks studies 11. Washington, DC: Dumbarton Oaks Center for Byzantine Studies. OCLC 390843.
