= Theodora Kantakouzene (disambiguation) =

Theodora Kantakouzene (c. 1340 - after 1390), was the wife of Alexios III of Trebizond.

Theodora Kantakouzene may also refer to:

- Theodora Raoulaina (c. 1240 – 1300), niece of Michael VIII Palaiologos and opponent of the Second Council of Lyon
- Theodora Palaiologina Angelina Kantakouzene, mother of John VI Kantakouzenos
- Theodora Kantakouzene, wife of Orhan (died after 1381), daughter of John VI Kantakouzenos and wife of Orhan of the Ottoman Emirate
- Theodora Kantakouzene (wife of Alexios IV of Trebizond) (died 1426)

== See also ==
- Kantakouzenos family
