= Raoul (Byzantine family) =

Byzantine noble family of Norman origin

Coat of arms of the Byzantine Raoul family

The Raoul family (Greek: Ῥαούλ) was a Byzantine aristocratic family of Norman origin, prominent during the Palaiologan period. From the 14th century on, they were also known as Ral[l]es (Ῥάλ[λ]ης). The feminine form of the name was Raoulaina (Ῥαούλαινα).

== Origin ==
The exact origin of the family is unknown. It has been suggested that it was founded by Rudolph Peel de Lan, a Norman who was sent as ambassador to Emperor Nikephoros III Botaneiates (r. 1078–1081) and whom Anna Komnene records as "Raoul" in her history. However, no source mentions a defection to the Byzantines.

Another view holds that Raoul was another ambassador sent in 1080, and brother of Roger "the son of Dagobert", who defected to the Byzantines at the same time and forced Raoul to flee to the imperial court as well.

== Branches ==
The first member of the family appears in 1108, when "Humbert, son of Graoul [Raoul]", a councillor of Emperor Alexios I Komnenos (r. 1081–1118) was part of the Byzantine delegation that signed the Treaty of Devol. The family is less prominent during the remainder of the century, although they were by all accounts prosperous landowners, with large estates in Thrace, and members of the imperial aristocracy.

In 1195, the sebastos Constantine Raoul supported the usurpation of Alexios III Angelos (r. 1195–1203). His possible son, the protovestiarios Alexios Raoul, was a senior military leader under John III Vatatzes (r. 1222–1254), but was not favoured by Theodore II Laskaris (r. 1254–1258), who stripped him of his title and imprisoned his four sons. The family thus sided with Michael VIII Palaiologos (r. 1259–1282). He appointed Alexios' eldest son, John Raoul Petraliphas, as protovestiarios, while another, Manuel, was made pinkernes. Manuel and a third brother, Isaac, supported Patriarch Arsenios Autoreianos in opposing the Union of the Churches however, and were arrested and blinded. John in the meantime had wed Theodora Palaiologina Kantakouzene, who after his death became a nun and one of the best-known literati of Constantinople in the last decades of the 13th century. Under Andronikos II Palaiologos (r. 1282–1328), their son Alexios was megas domestikos and one of his sons megas stratopedarches.

Another Alexios Raoul was megas domestikos after 1333. Manuel Raoul was a writer and official who spent part of his career in the Despotate of the Morea.

The family declined after the mid-14th century, except for its Moreote branch, which flourished and was active up to the time of the Ottoman conquest. The brothers Thomas and George Rallis led a rebellion against the Ottomans in 1458/1460. Other members of the family accompanied princess Sophia Palaiologina to Muscovy, where they served as diplomats.

== Sources and bibliography ==
- Chatzis, Ch. (1909). Οι Ραούλ, Ραλ, Ράλαι, 1080–1800: ιστορική μονογραφία (in Greek). Kirchhain.
- Fassoulakis, Sterios (1973). The Byzantine Family of Raoul-Ral(l)es. Athens.
- Kazhdan, Alexander, ed. (1991), Oxford Dictionary of Byzantium, Oxford University Press, p. 1771, ISBN 978-0-19-504652-6
