= Theodora Raoulaina =

Byzantine noblewoman, nun and scholar

Theodora Palaiologina Kantakouzene Raoulaina (Greek: Θεοδώρα Κομνηνή Καντακουζηνή Παλαιολογίνα Ραούλαινα, c. 1240–1300) was a Byzantine noblewoman, the niece of Emperor Michael VIII Palaiologos (r. 1259–1282). Widowed twice, she clashed with her uncle over his unionist religious policies, and became a nun. She also restored the monastery of Saint Andrew in Krisei, to where she transferred the relics of Patriarch Arsenios Autoreianos. Highly educated, she was a prominent member of the capital's literary circles at the close of the 13th century.

== Biography ==
=== Family and early life ===
Theodora was born c. 1240 in the Empire of Nicaea, the third daughter of John Kantakouzenos and Irene Komnene Palaiologina. Her father was pinkernes and later doux of the Thracesian theme, while her mother was the second daughter of the megas domestikos Andronikos Palaiologos and thus the sister of the future emperor Michael VIII Palaiologos (r. 1259–1282). After her husband died (some time before 1257), she became a nun by the name Eulogia. Theodora had three other sisters, Anna, Maria, and Eugenia. Anna married the Despot of Epirus, Nikephoros I Komnenos Doukas (r. 1267/1268 – c. 1297), and became regent after his death. Maria married Tsar Constantine Tikh of Bulgaria (r. 1257–1277), while Eugenia married the Cuman megas domestikos Syrgiannes, and was the mother of Syrgiannes Palaiologos.

In 1256, Theodora wedded George Mouzalon in a marriage arranged by Emperor Theodore II Laskaris (r. 1254–1258). Mouzalon was of humble origin, but had risen to the high office of protovestiarios through the favour of the Byzantine emperor, whose childhood friend he was. The marriage, and similar ones for the emperor's other "new men", was designed by Theodore as a means of raising the status of his low-born protégés. However, these unions, and Theodore's consistent anti-aristocratic policies, earned the hostility of the traditional noble families. At Theodore's death in August 1258, Mouzalon became the regent for the Empire and the young John IV Laskaris (r. 1258–1261), but was murdered by soldiers along with other family members in a coup, organized by the aristocrats, only a few days later during a memorial service for the departed emperor. The driving force behind the aristocrats' conspiracy was Michael Palaiologos, Theodora's own uncle, who quickly succeeded Mouzalon as regent and was crowned co-emperor in early 1259. During the coup, Theodora alone reacted to the killings, going to her uncle and asking for her husband to be spared. Michael reproved her, and told her to be silent lest she too share his fate.

In 1261, following the recapture of Constantinople by Michael VIII and his crowning as sole emperor of the restored Byzantine Empire, Theodora was married again to the newly promoted protovestiarios John Raoul Petraliphas, a scion of the noble Raoul family and senior military officer. Before his death in circa 1274, she gave birth to two daughters, Irene and Anna.

=== Clash with Michael VIII ===
Following the usual practice for noble women of the time, when her second husband died, Theodora retired to a monastery. It was at this time, however, that she came to public prominence through the issue that divided Byzantine society: the question of Union with the Roman Church.

Ever since the recovery of Constantinople, Michael VIII's position was precarious: the threat of a renewed Latin effort to take back the city was ever-present, and intensified with the rise of the ambitious Charles of Anjou to dominion over southern Italy and his intention to restore the Latin Empire under his aegis. The only power that could avert such an attack was the Papacy, and thus Michael engaged in negotiations for the Union of the Churches, which finally bore fruit in 1274, at the Second Council of Lyon. The Union, however, and the concessions this entailed to the Papacy in matters of doctrine, were deeply unpopular amongst the Byzantines themselves, and aggravated Michael's already tense relations with the Orthodox clergy on account of his dismissal of the Patriarch Arsenios Autoreianos, who had excommunicated the emperor for his usurpation of the throne from John IV Laskaris.

Opposition to the Union emerged even within Michael's own family: among the most fanatic dissenters was Theodora's mother, Irene, once Michael's favourite sister. Theodora staunchly supported her mother, along with Manuel and Isaac Raoul, brothers of her late husband John. Because of their anti-unionist activities, mother and daughter were exiled to the fortress of St. George on the Black Sea coast. Irene, however, was able to escape from her imprisonment to the court of her daughter Maria in Bulgaria, from where she even plotted a military coalition with the Mamelukes to overthrow her brother.

=== Activities under Andronikos II ===
Theodora's exile lasted until Michael's death in 1282. His son and successor, Andronikos II Palaiologos (r. 1282–1328) overturned his father's religious policies regarding the Union. The problem of the Arsenites, the supporters of deposed Patriarch Arsenios, who refused to recognize his successors, remained. Andronikos II tried to mediate, and convened a Church Council at Adramyttion in 1284. Both Theodora and her mother Irene participated in this, but it failed to alleviate the schism. Theodora herself was an Arsenite, but more moderate than her mother. Indeed, she formed a close bond with the new patriarch, Gregory II, whose scholarly abilities she admired and who would become her spiritual father.

Theodora and her sister Anna returned to Constantinople after the council, while their mother remained behind at Adramyttion, where she died later in the same year. At about the same time, Theodora renovated the monastery of Saint Andrew in Krisei in Constantinople and turned it into a convent. There, she relocated the relics of Patriarch Arsenios (who had died in 1273) from the Hagia Sophia, and spent the remainder of her life, devoted to her monastic duties and scholarly pursuits. In 1289, when her friend, Patriarch Gregory II, resigned, she gave him refuge in the so-called Aristine mansion, which lay alongside the monastery of Saint Andrew.

Theodora's last public action came in 1295. Based on his successes against the Turks and the disaffection of the inhabitants of Asia Minor with the Palaiologoi, the general Alexios Philanthropenos had declared himself emperor. Theodora was sent by Emperor Andronikos II, along with her brother-in-law Isaac Raoul who had also been involved in a failed conspiracy and was blinded, to treat with him and persuade him to surrender. Her embassy failed, and Philanthropenos was soon after betrayed and blinded. Nothing further is known of her life until her death, on 6 December 1300.

== Sources ==
- Geanakoplos, Deno John (1959). Emperor Michael Palaeologus and the West, 1258–1282 – A Study in Byzantine-Latin Relations. Cambridge, Massachusetts: Harvard University Press.
- Katsiampoura, Yanna (1 August 2002). "Theodora Raoulaina". Encyclopedia of the Hellenic World, Asia Minor. Athens, Greece: Foundation of the Hellenic World.
- Kazhdan, Alexander, ed. (1991). The Oxford Dictionary of Byzantium. Oxford and New York: Oxford University Press. ISBN 0-19-504652-8.
- Nicol, Donald M. (1994). "Theodora Raoulaina, Nun and Scholar, c. 1240–1300". The Byzantine Lady: Ten Portraits, 1250–1500. Cambridge and New York: Cambridge University Press. pp. 33–47. ISBN 0-521-45531-6.
