= Khalwa (Sufism) =

Solitary retreat in Sufism

In Sufism, Khalwa (Arabic: خلوة, also khalwat; lit., "solitude"; pronounced in Iran, "khalvat"; spelling in Turkish, halvet) is a solitary retreat, traditionally for forty days, during which a disciple does extensive spiritual exercises under the direction of a shaykh.

A Sufi murid will enter the khalwa spiritual retreat under the direction of a shaykh for a given period, sometimes for as long as 40 days, emerging only for salah (daily prayers) and, usually, to discuss dreams, visions and live with the shaykh. Once a major element of Sufi practice, khalwa has become less frequent in recent years.

It is the act of total self-abandonment in desire for the Divine Presence. In complete seclusion, the Sufi continuously repeats the name of God as a highest form of dhikr, remembrance of God. Then, "Almighty God will spread before him the degrees of the kingdom as a test".

The Khalwati order (Halveti) of Sufism derives its name from the term "khalwa".

== Khalwa in Sudan ==
A religious school is known as a khalwa in Sudanese Arabic. This reflects the former dominance of Sufism in the Sudan, khalwa is also known as self isolation among the Sufi orders. In Sudan this practice of khalwa is directly linked with the Prophets and various Sufi orders and seen as a way of attaining spiritual insights, modelled on various Prophets including the Prophet Muhammed's practice of self isolation in his lifetime in the cave of Hira around Makkah and in his home in Madinah but also Jesus's 40 days in the desert, Yahya's also known as John the Baptist self isolating time in the desert and Moses's 40 years in the desert and various other Prophet's practice of this, Khalwa is only practiced by a devoted student of the Sufi orders who are seeking higher spiritual attainments and not for ordinary Muslims who are only prescribed the 5 pillars hence Sufism in Sudan is seen as an extra curricular practice to the 5 pillars that the Prophet Muhammed practiced in his life time (including fasting on Mondays and Thursdays) according to the sira and hadith, since the rise of the Salafi movement in Sudan and it's anti-Sufi sentiment this practice has declined.

== Historical Origins ==
Despite Persian roots of the word khalwa, the historical origins of the practice are a subject of debate. The Persian mystic Ibrahim al-Zahid is believed to have established the concepts of the khalwa. He indicates that Umar al-Khalwati institutionalized the Sufi tradition and earned his name through frequent retreats, which are thought to be the origins of the khalwa practice. However, the Khalwati order claims Umar's teacher, Muhammad ibn Nur al-Khalwati, to be the founder.

Some devotees of the practice ascribe the origins of the khalwa to the Prophet Muhammad, who was said to have retreated into solitary retreat in the cave of Hira. The Prophet's meditation led to an encounter with Jibril and the reception of revelations, inspiring the practice of the khalwa.

== Different Khalwa Practices ==
The khalwa ceremony in the Demirdashiya al-Khalwatiya order of the Khalwati in Cairo takes place for three days in the month of Sha'ban on the birth date of the founding shaikh under strict rules regarding eating, ascetic involvement, and sexuality. A dinner with the shaikh prior to the first day is organized before a morning of prayer. A ceremony of keys then takes place, in which a naqib identifies a cell in the mosque and a verse of prayer for an adept to enter into for the solitary retreat. Throughout the khalwa, the Qu'ran is recited. Dinner consists of a biscuit and yogurt, or a large meal prepared in the shaikh's house if the khalwa aligns with Ramadan.

Other variations of the khalwa exist, depending on the intention. A more severe version of the khalwa models itself after Ramadan, consisting of a forty-day retreat. Unlike the three-day version, the participant is allowed to break silence during dinner. Another version of the khalwa can be taken to receive something beneficial in return, such as healing.

In Mevlevi tradition, the khalwa consists of 1001 days of uninterrupted service, such as in the kitchen (chella-khâna). Similar to the Demirdash, living in a cell is involved, though for the Mevlevi, it is only offered once the khalwa is complete. Choosing to live in the cell leads to leadership promotion within the Mevlevi order.

Although the khalwa is commonly synonymous with spiritual transcendence, the khalwa can be dangerous if not done correctly or without enough preparation. Najm al-Din Kubra, a Central Asian Sufi master, notes how a man went mad after entering a khalwa without enough guidance, cursing his mother and eating feces. The mental and physical harms that may befall someone are attributed to the idea of Satan entering the cell and corrupting the person. Despite these dangers, many people believe the spiritual and powerful benefits the khalwa achieves outweigh the costs.

== Khalwa in Different Sufi Orders ==
The khalwa holds historical and religious roots in the Khalwati order, or the Khalwatiya. Despite Persian roots of the khalwa, some Islamic history scholars, such as Abu Wafa' al-Taftazani, regard the ascetic practices of the Khalwati, including the khalwa, to stem from the Arab-speaking world and the cultural context of Egypt and Syrian Sufism. Al-Taftazani claims that spiritual influences from Andalucia and Morocco are thought to have informed the practice of khalwa within the Khalwati. The khalwa may have stemmed from the ideas displayed by the Andalusian Sunni Sufi scholar Ibn 'Arabi, rather than Persian or other external influences. However, other scholars note that the practice of fasting and an encounter with a deity provide an expansion of influence outside of Ibn 'Arabi and Syrian Sufism.

The khalwa in the Demirdashiya al-Khalwatiya order in Cairo notably provided an environment for spiritual contemplation and alignment. As the only surviving founding Khalwatiya, the order has roots into the Egyptian spiritual psyche. Saints are reported to have felt the power of the Dermidash line and reached a spiritual enlightenment after seeing the Prophet, thus becoming a saint of Islam. For the Demirdash, the khalwa serves as a meditational orientation for the masses for their Islam and a powerful link to a saintly line. The Demirdashiya and their ascetic influences reached outside of Egypt, such as the Ottoman Empire. In 923 AD, Ottoman Sultan Salim I Yavuz returned to the Empire with books from Demirdash.

The Khalwatiyya Sufi order is known for its emphasis on silent meditation, ritual prayer, and periods of voluntary seclusion, or khalwat, as a means of spiritual purification and closeness to God.

== See also ==
- The White Days
