= Alexios Raoul =

Alexios Raoul (Greek: Ἀλέξιος Ῥαούλ; died c. 1258) was a Byzantine aristocrat and general of the Empire of Nicaea. He attained the rank of protovestiarios during the reign of Emperor John III Vatatzes (r. 1221–1254).

== Biography ==
Alexios Raoul was the scion of a wealthy aristocratic family with large landholdings around Smyrna, and possibly the son of the sebastos Constantine Raoul, who had played a role in the usurpation of Alexios III Angelos (r. 1195–1203). He became the son-in-law of Emperor John III Vatatzes (r. 1221–1254), having married a niece of his. Alexios and Vatatzes's niece together had four sons, three of whom are known by name, John, Manuel and Isaac, and one daughter.

Under Vatatzes, Alexios was raised to the rank of protovestiarios, and was given command of troops in Macedonia. In 1242, he accompanied the emperor in his campaign against the ruler of Thessalonica, John Komnenos Doukas (r. 1237–1244). He appears again in 1252, during Vatatzes's wars against the Despot of Epirus Michael II Komnenos Doukas (r. 1230–1268). After the conclusion of a peace treaty, Alexios apparently remained in Europe along with the future emperor Michael Palaiologos (r. 1259–1282) at Vodena, guarding the approaches to Thessalonica.

As a member of the traditional aristocracy, he and his family suffered under Theodore II Laskaris (r. 1254–1258). Theodore sought to reduce the nobility's power and influence, and favoured men of humble origin, whom he appointed to the highest state offices. In 1255, the emperor stripped him of his title and awarded it to his low-born protégé, George Mouzalon. Furthermore, Theodore married one of Raoul's daughters to George's brother Andronikos Mouzalon, an act regarded as insulting, given the groom's origin. In addition, Theodore II imprisoned Alexios's sons (the exact date is not clear).

Consequently, the family actively supported the murder of the Mouzalon brothers in 1258, following Theodore II's death, and the subsequent usurpation of Michael VIII Palaiologos (r. 1259–1282).

== Sources ==
- Macrides, Ruth (2007). George Akropolites: The History – Introduction, Translation and Commentary. Oxford: Oxford University Press. ISBN 978-0-19-921067-1.
- Kazhdan, Alexander, ed. (1991). The Oxford Dictionary of Byzantium. Oxford and New York: Oxford University Press. ISBN 0-19-504652-8.
- Vougiouklaki, Penelope (20 February 2003). "Alexios Raoul". Encyclopedia of the Hellenic World, Asia Minor. Athens: Foundation of the Hellenic World. Archived from the original on 27 February 2012.
