= Yahya al-Shirvani al-Bakubi =

Azerbaijani scientist and philosopher

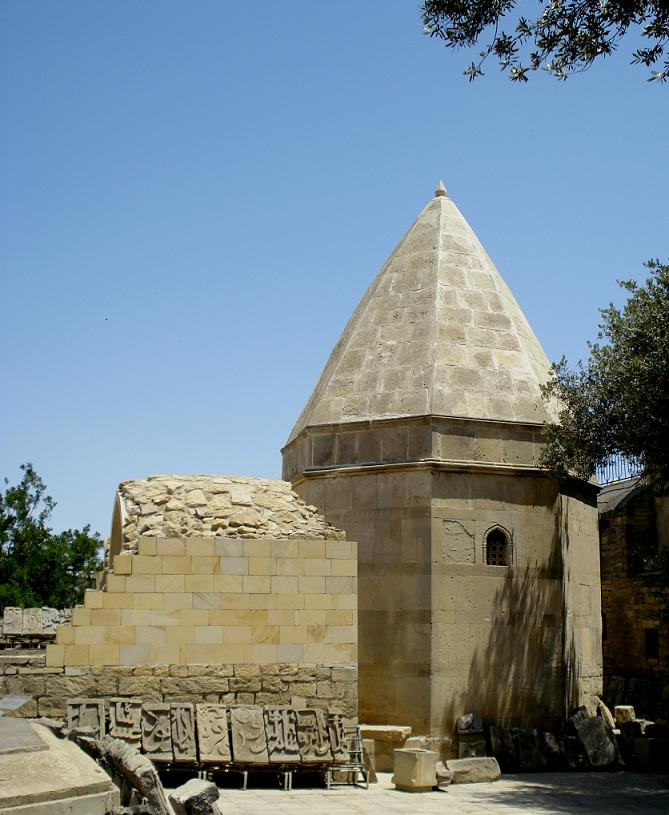
Mausoleum of Yahya al-Shirvani al-Bakubi in Baku, Azerbaijan

Yahya al-Shirvani al-Bakubi (also spelled Bakuvi) was a 15th-century Sufi mystic from Shamakhi, who established the Khalwati order.

== Biography ==
Yahya was born in Shamakhi in the region of Shirvan, then ruled by the Shirvanshahs. "Khalwati" is derived from the Arabic word Khalwa (Khalwat in Persian), which means hermitage. This was connected to a fundamental principle of the order, which instructed members to spend 40 days in a small cell during solitary retreat once a year, during which they were to fast and pray continuously. The Khalwati order consider their founder to be the Sufi master and teacher Umar al-Khalwati, who died in 1397 in the city of Tabriz in northwestern Iran. However, according to German orientalist Hans Joachim Kissling, Umar al-Khalwati's successor Yahya was the real creator of the Khalwati order, and was not given credit for it since the Khalwati members wanted the name of their order to be associated with Umar al-Khalwati. According to Mehrdad Kia, Yahya "is considered to be the brotherhood's actual founder".

Yahya lived in an era when there was a great deal of political unrest and religious activity in the Caucasus, Iranian Azerbaijan, and Anatolia. This was the environment in which Yahya's operations were occurring. Following a disagreement with a rival Sufi, Yahya relocated from Shamakhi to Baku in c. 1460. There he established a prominent religious and political movement. The Ottoman historian and hagiographer Taşköprüzade reported that Yahya "attracted around him ten thousand people. He sent his khalifas [Sufi delegates] to all parts of the region, and was the first person to do this." Yahya is the author of Wird al-Sattar, which members of most Khalwati branches are required to read. He died in Baku in 1464.

Following his death, the Khalwati order's headquarters were relocated to Amasya in north central Anatolia by Yahya's followers Pir Ilyas and Zakariya al-Khalwati. This relocation may have been related to Pir Ilyas's personal background; or due to a conflict with the Shirvanshah at Shamakhi, or it may have been the result of their support of the Safavids during Shaykh Junayd's campaign in 1460, which ended in his defeat and killing at the hands of the Shirvanshah Khalilullah I. Given the Safavid and Khalwati shared origins, rituals, philosophies, and spiritual forefathers, it is difficult to pinpoint their precise relationship.

== Sources ==
- Bosworth, C. E. (2011). "Šervānšāhs". Encyclopaedia Iranica. Routledge & Kegan Paul.
- de Jong, F. (1978). "K̲h̲alwatiyya". In van Donzel, E.; Lewis, B.; Pellat, Ch. & Bosworth, C. E. (eds.). The Encyclopaedia of Islam, Second Edition. Volume IV: Iran–Kha. Leiden: E. J. Brill. ISBN 978-90-04-05745-6. OCLC 758278456.
- Kia, Mehrdad (2017). The Ottoman Empire: A Historical Encyclopedia [2 volumes]. Bloomsbury Publishing. ISBN 978-1610693882.
- Martin, B. G. (1978). "A Short History of the Khalwati Order of Dervishes". In Nikki R., Keddie (ed.). Scholars Saints and Sufis: Muslim Religious Institutions Since 1500. Univ of California Press. ISBN 978-0520036444.
- Waugh, Earle H. (2008). Visionaries of Silence: The Reformist Sufi Order of the Demirdashiya Al-Khalwatiya in Cairo. Oxford University Press. ISBN 978-9774160899.
