= Sunbuliye =

The Sunbuliye is a branch of the Halveti order of Sufi Islam, founded by Sunbul Sinan Efendi, more commonly known in Turkey as 'Sunbul Effendi'. Sunbul Effendi was born in 1464 or between 1475 and 1480 in Merzifon, Turkey. He became a dervish with Shaikh Muhammed Jemaleddin al-Khalwati of the Halveti order at the Koja Mustafa Pasha Dergah/Mosque in Istanbul.

After becoming a Khalif or representative of Sheikh Muhammed Jemaluddin he was sent to Egypt where he spread the Halveti order. Upon hearing of his sheykh's death he returned to Istanbul to serve the Halveti order until his death in 1529. He is buried in the Koja Mustafa Pasha Tekke in the Fatih district of Istanbul. For several hundred years this Tekke served as the centre of the Sunbuli order with all of the grand Sheikhs of the order being buried at the Tekke.

When Turkey became a republic the Sunbuli tekke along with all others was closed. It was later re-opened in the form of a Mosque a position of which it continues to serve. The resting place of Sunbul Effendi remains a place of pilgrimage by pious Muslims in Turkey.

The following is the Sunbuliye's genealogy:

Khalwatiyya: Pir Umar Khalwati

Jemaliye: Pir Muhammed Jemaleddin Halveti

Sunbuliye: Pir Sumbul Sinan (branch of Jemaliye)

Merkeziye: Pir Musa Muslihuddin (known as 'Merkez Effendi')(branch of Sunbuliye) His resting place is at the Merkez Effendi Mosque (formerly the Merkez Effendi Tekke in Istanbul
