= Shaban Veli =

Shaban-i Veli (Turkish: Şaban-ı Veli) also written as Sha’ban Wali (d. 976 AH/1569 AD), was an Ottoman Sufi saint from Kastamonu, and founder of the Shabaniyya branch of the Khalwatiyya order. He was trained under and was a murid (disciple) of Hayreddin Tokadi of Bolu.

== Biography ==
He was born in Taşköprü district of Kastamonu. An important part of the information about his life is based on the work of Ömer Fuâdî, the fifth sheikh of Şaban-ı Velî Dergah, named Menâkıb-ı Şerîf-i Pir-i Halveti Hazret-i Şa'bân-ı Veli. Ömer Fuadi does not give information about his date of birth. In recent sources, the years 902 (1497) and 905 (1499-1500) are mentioned for his birth. It is claimed that he was born in 886 AH (1481 AD) based on a record in a recent Shabani license (icâzetnâme), and it is stated that the same date is given in a series found in the Şaban-ı Velî Museum. Shaban-i Veli lost his mother and father at a young age and was adopted by a sissy (hanım evladı). After completing his primary education in Taşköprü, he studied tafsir and hadith and received his license from Hodja Veli son of Osman, buried in the Abdürrezzak Mosque Tomb in Kastamonu. Later, he went to Istanbul for his studies and stayed at one of the madrasas in Fatih district (Constantinople). Available information points to this school being the Karadeniz Bashkirsunlu Madrasa, where he studied sacred sciences such as the Qur'an, tafsir and hadith for nine years, and was appointed to the posts of sheikh and lecturer at Eyüp Mosque. This info is not included in the old sources.

Along with Ömer Fuâdî, one of the Shabani sheikhs, Ibrahim Has written a menâkıbnâme about Shaban-i Velî, which he called Tezkiretü'l-Has. The last sheikh of the Shabân-ı Veli Dergah, Mehmed Ataullah Efendi (Armay), wrote an addendum to Ömer Fuâdî's Menâkıbname. As the Halvetiyye is the most branched order, the Shabaniyya order within it is the most common order with many branches. Shabaniyya was present in a very wide geography from Anatolia, the Balkans, Iraq, Syria and the Hejaz to the interiors of India and Africa.

== The Four Poles of Anatolia ==
Shaban-i Veli is accepted as one of the four poles (aqtab) of Anatolia by all tariqa circles, the others being Mawlana Rumi, Haji Bektash Veli, and Haji Bayram Veli.
