= Genoese occupation of Rhodes =

Genoese occupation of Rhodes 1248/1250

Coordinates: 36°10′N 27°56′E

- Part of the Nicaean-Latin Wars
Date	1248–1249/50
Location	Rhodes, Greece
Result	Nicaean victory

Belligerents
Empire of Nicaea	Republic of Genoa; Principality of Achaea

Commanders and leaders
John Kantakouzenos; Theodore Kontostephanos	Unknown Genoese leaders William II of Achaea
- Location of Rhodes within Greece

The Genoese occupation of Rhodes, between 1248 and late 1249/early 1250, the city of Rhodes and parts of the island of Rhodes were under Genoese control. The Genoese took possession of the city and island, a dependency of the Empire of Nicaea, in a surprise attack in 1248, and held it, with aid from the Principality of Achaea, against Nicaean attacks until 1250.

== Background ==
In the early 13th century, possibly already before the fall of Constantinople to the Fourth Crusade in 1204, Rhodes and its nearby islands were detached from the control of the central Byzantine government under the rule of the Caesar Leo Gabalas. Although at times Gabalas seems to have acknowledged the suzerainty of the main Byzantine Greek successor state, the Empire of Nicaea, Rhodes became the centre of a practically independent domain.

In an effort to counterbalance Nicaea and strengthen his position, Leo concluded treaties with the Republic of Venice in 1234 and 1236, but his brother John Gabalas, who succeeded him when Leo died in c. 1240, was clearly in a less powerful position, and he soon recognized the overlordship of the Nicaean emperor John III Doukas Vatatzes. In exchange he received the high titles of sebastos and megas doux, and likely the hand of an imperial relative (possibly one of Vatatzes' sisters).

At the same time, the Republic of Genoa, left out of the spoils of the Fourth Crusade and sidelined by Venice in Constantinople, was eager to acquire footholds in the East. The Genoese sent several embassies to Nicaea, but apparently without much success. This failure, as well as the threat posed to the two maritime republics by Frederick II Hohenstaufen, forced Genoa and Venice to a temporary rapprochement: in a treaty signed in 1248 they divided the Mediterranean into spheres of influence. Rhodes was in an area to be jointly controlled by the two republics.

== Occupation and reconquest ==
In 1247 or 1248, John Gabalas left the island with land and naval forces to join in a Nicaean campaign against the Latin Empire in the area of Nicomedia. In his absence, in spring or summer of 1248, (Note: Various incorrect dates have been given in older historical literature for the Genoese assault on Rhodes, from as early as 1246 to as late as the final year of John Vatatzes' reign (i.e. 1254). However, the fact that sailing in winter was extremely unusual, and the "apparently prolonged" siege of Rhodes that followed the Genoese occupation, point to a Genoese arrival on the island in spring or summer 1248.) a Genoese fleet, possibly sailing to join King Louis IX of France's Seventh Crusade, came upon Rhodes, which they found to be virtually unprotected. Given that Genoa had long coveted the island due to its strategic position, the Genoese exploited the opportunity and in a surprise night attack seized the city of Rhodes, the island's capital.

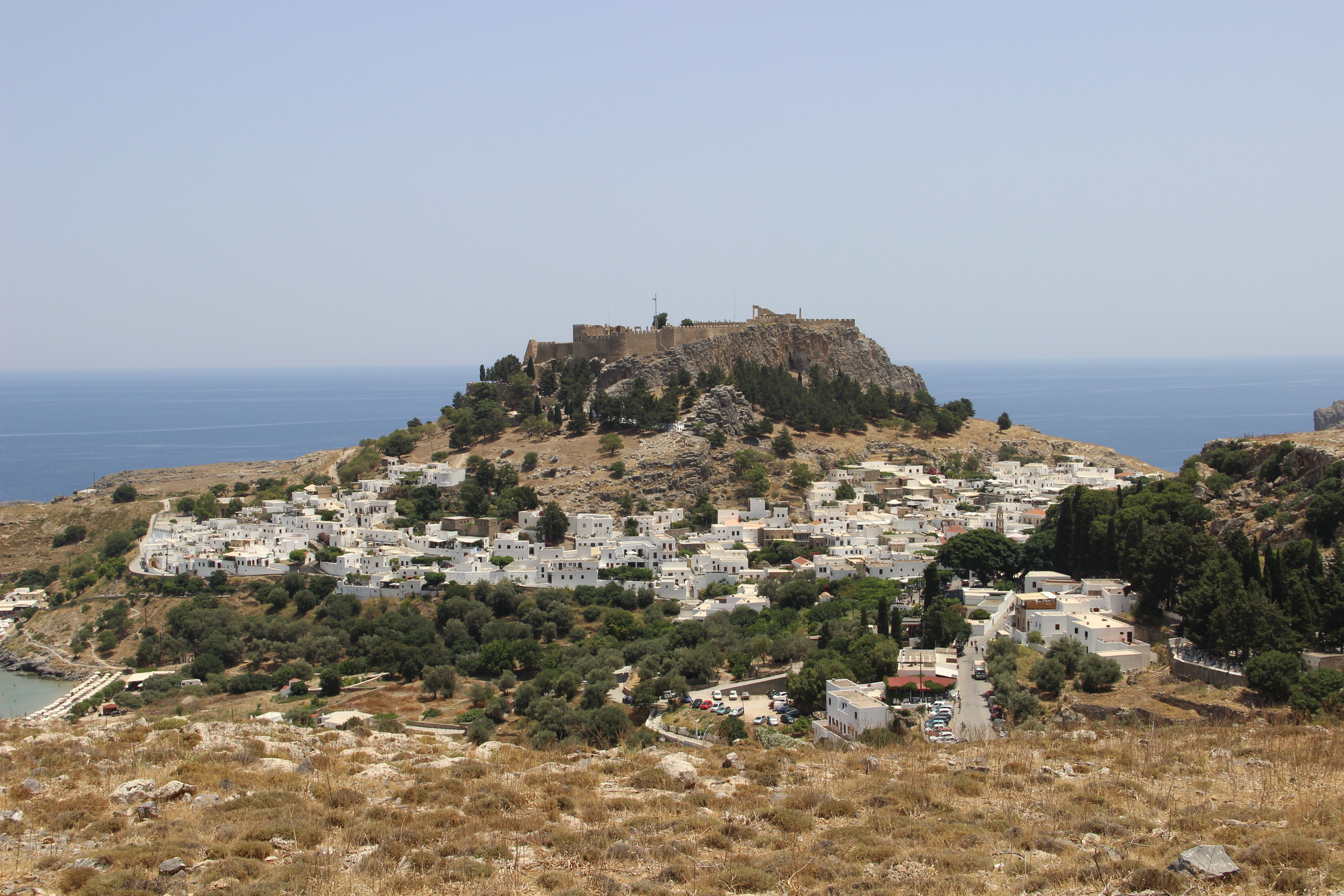
View of the citadel of Lindos (2014)

Vatatzes reacted swiftly, sending a fleet to the island, led by the pinkernes and doux of the Thracesian Theme, John Kantakouzenos. Kantakouzenos set out in late 1248 or early 1249, but did not directly move to Rhodes, instead capturing first the islands of Leros and Kalymnos. Initially Kantakouzenos had only a small army at his disposal, possibly only troops from his own Thracesian Theme. As a result, he apparently first moved to secure the fortresses in the southern part of the island not yet captured by the Genoese, before marching north towards the city of Rhodes. The Nicaeans landed near the fortress town of Lindos, some 40 kilometres (25 mi) south of Rhodes city, and then established their base at Phileremos, 5 kilometres (3.1 mi) southwest of Rhodes city. At this time, reinforcements sent by Vatatzes arrived, allowing Kantakouzenos to blockade the Genoese in the capital.

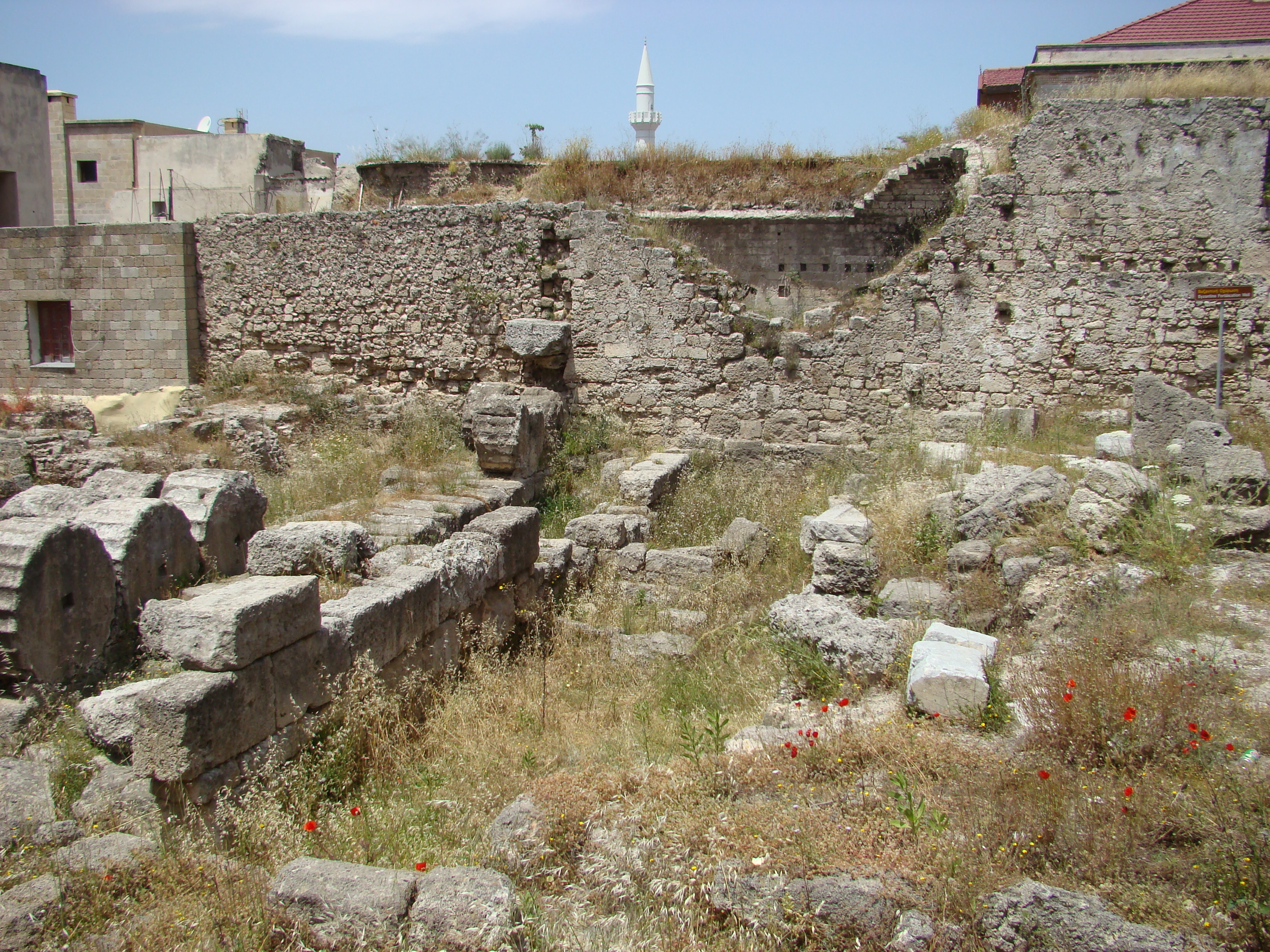
Remnants of the Byzantine fortifications of Rhodes city (2008)

The Genoese defenders were well supplied with food, which they had seized from the inhabitants. As a result, they were not greatly discomfited—the contemporary historian George Akropolites even complains that they slept with the most beautiful local women, expelling the old and ugly ones from the city—and the blockade dragged on into spring. According to Akropolites, the city was on the verge of falling, when, in about the middle of May 1249, (Note: Since Villehardouin arrived in Cyprus on or about 24 May, he must have arrived at Rhodes around 10/15 May.) William II of Villehardouin, the Prince of Achaea, and Hugh IV, the Duke of Burgundy, arrived by chance in Rhodes city, on their way to join the Seventh Crusade then about to sail from Cyprus for Egypt. Of the 400 knights with him, Villehardouin agreed to leave 100 in Rhodes to assist the Genoese. This caused the Nicaeans to raise the siege and fall back to Phileremos, where they were themselves now besieged by the Genoese both by land and sea, while the Achaeans ravaged the countryside.

When Vatatzes was informed of these events at Nymphaion, he ordered another expeditionary force to be prepared in Smyrna, comprising 300 horse under the protosebastos Theodore Kontostephanos, to whom Vatatzes gave written instructions for the campaign. The arrival of Kontostephanos and his men once again tipped the balance: the Nicaean troops caught the Achaeans off guard while they were scattered in the countryside and busy with plundering, and killed them all at Kantakouzenos' orders. The Genoese fled back to the city of Rhodes, but as they were unable to withstand another siege, they agreed to surrender it in exchange for their safe departure. This took place either in late 1249 or early 1250. (Note: The historian Michael Hendy even suggests as late as spring or summer of 1250, judging that Kontostephanos' expedition must have sailed in spring 1250.) The island was certainly recovered soon enough that news reached Vatatzes' ally, Frederick II Hohenstaufen, before September 1250, when he addressed a letter to the Nicaean emperor congratulating him on this success.

== Aftermath ==
Following the eviction of the Genoese, Rhodes became fully incorporated into the Empire of Nicaea, and Gabalas family rule was discontinued. Rhodes may have been briefly restored to John Gabalas, but he died soon after, probably before the year 1250 was out. His son Leo was probably underage at the time. Although a nephew of the Nicaean emperor, he was not allowed to succeed his father, and instead left Rhodes with his mother and settled in Crete. Around 1256, or, according to a different opinion, after the recapture of Constantinople in 1261, the island's government was entrusted to John Palaiologos, the younger brother of Emperor Michael VIII Palaiologos (r. 1259–1282). Nevertheless, already c. 1278, the increasing threat of Turkish raids led Michael VIII to grant Rhodes to John de lo Cavo, a Genoese corsair in Imperial service, as a fief.

Western, and specifically Genoese, interest in Rhodes did not abate. With the rapid enfeeblement of the restored Byzantine Empire under Andronikos II Palaiologos (r. 1282–1328), the Western powers hatched new plans to seize the strategically situated island. In the 1300s, the Venetians began seizing some of the neighbouring islands in the 1300s, and cast their sights on Rhodes as well. At the same time, however, Andronikos II gave some of the islands as fiefs to Genoese corsairs in his service: Andrea Morisco and his uncle Vignolo de' Vignoli. Faced with the threat of Venetian expansion, the latter allied with the Knights Hospitaller, leading to the Hospitaller conquest of Rhodes, begun in 1306 and completed, after a long siege of the capital of Rhodes, in 1309/10.
