= Khizr Rumi Qalandar =

Sufi saint (d. 1349–50)

Shah Khizr Rumi Qalandar
- Title: Khizr Rumi Qalandar

Personal life
- Born: Rum (Anatolia, modern-day Turkey)
- Died: c. 750 AH / 1349–50 CE (traditional) Rum (Anatolia)
- Era: Delhi Sultanate period (reign of Iltutmish: 1210–1236 CE)
- Known for: Introducing the Qalandariyya to India; disciple of Qutb al-Din Bakhtiyar Kaki

Religious life
- Religion: Islam
- Order: Qalandariyya–Chishtiyya

Muslim leader
- Influenced: Bu Ali Shah Qalandar, Qutbuddin Sarandazi, Shah Qutb Jaunpuri

Shah Khizr Rumi Qalandar (Arabic: شاه خضر رومی) was a 13th century Sufi saint of the Qalandariyya path who came from the province of Rum in Anatolia and became one of the earliest Qalandars to arrive in India. He played a foundational role in establishing the Qalandariyya-Chishtiyya fraternity in the Indian subcontinent during the reign of Sultan Iltutmish.

== Biography ==
=== Origin and Qalandari Disposition ===
Khizr Rumi is described as a Qalandar originating from Rum. Many miraculous and extraordinary spiritual acts were witnessed through him, despite the Qalandariyya's characteristic non-conformity toward formal initiation (inabat) and discipleship (bay‘at). Accounts describe Qalandars as outspoken and fiercely independent ascetics, which shaped his distinct spiritual persona.

=== Arrival in Delhi ===
Khizr Rumi reached Delhi when Shaikh-ul-Islam Khwaja Qutb al-Din Bakhtiyar Kaki was alive. Desiring guidance, he directed his devotion toward the Chishti master. Kaki sent him a cap and a robe (khirqa) of spiritual authorization, permitting his entry into the Chishti silsilah while allowing him to retain his Qalandari attire and practices.

Although he intended to visit Kaki physically, the shaykh aware of the uncompromising independence of Qalandars sent the formal spiritual lineage (shajra) to him at a distance, granting him initiation without a meeting in person. Foreseeing potential disruptions inherent to Qalandar temperament, Kaki instructed him to refrain from ostentatious or spiritually questionable miracles.

=== Establishment in Jaunpur ===
After Delhi, Khizr Rumi travelled to Sururpur (Sarharpur) near Jaunpur. There he initiated Saiyid Najm al-Din Ghaus al-Dahr and bestowed upon him the khirqah of Khilafat, after which the order continued through Shah Qutb's descendants. His lineage thus flourished within the Indian subcontinent, while he returned to Rum.

== Sufi Lineage and Influence ==
=== Association with Qalandariyya Founder ===
Traditional narratives describe Khizr Rumi as the disciple of Abdul Aziz Abdullah Alambardar Makki, a semi-legendary figure regarded by Qalandar tradition as extraordinarily long-lived and spiritually connected to early Islamic companions. Through him, Khizr Rumi is linked to the earliest Qalandariyya spirituality.

=== Integration with the Chishti Order ===
Through his acceptance into the Chishti silsilah by Kaki, Khizr Rumi became the source of a new derivative path known as the Qalandariyya-Chishtiyya, which gained particular prominence in Jaunpur and the eastern regions of Uttar Pradesh.

=== Notable Disciples and Successors ===
Prominent successors included Bu Ali Shah Qalandar of Panipat, whose tomb became a major pilgrimage site and who is cited by later writers as a key authority of the order.

== Death ==
Khizr Rumi eventually returned to Rum, where he died. Sufi historians such as S.A.A. Rizvi assign his death to 750 AH / 1349/50 CE, though older biographical dictionaries place his Indian activity earlier, within the period of Sultan Iltutmish.

== Legacy ==
Shah Khizr Rumi Qalandar is regarded as the first Qalandar saints to reach India from Anatolia. His spiritual work contributed to transforming the wandering Qalandar ethos into a more settled form within khanqahs. The silsilah he founded, the Qalandariyya-Chishtiyya, continues in India, particularly through the Jaunpuri branch. Historical records uniformly regard him as a saint of extraordinary power, humility and spiritual integration.
