= Sünbül Efendi =

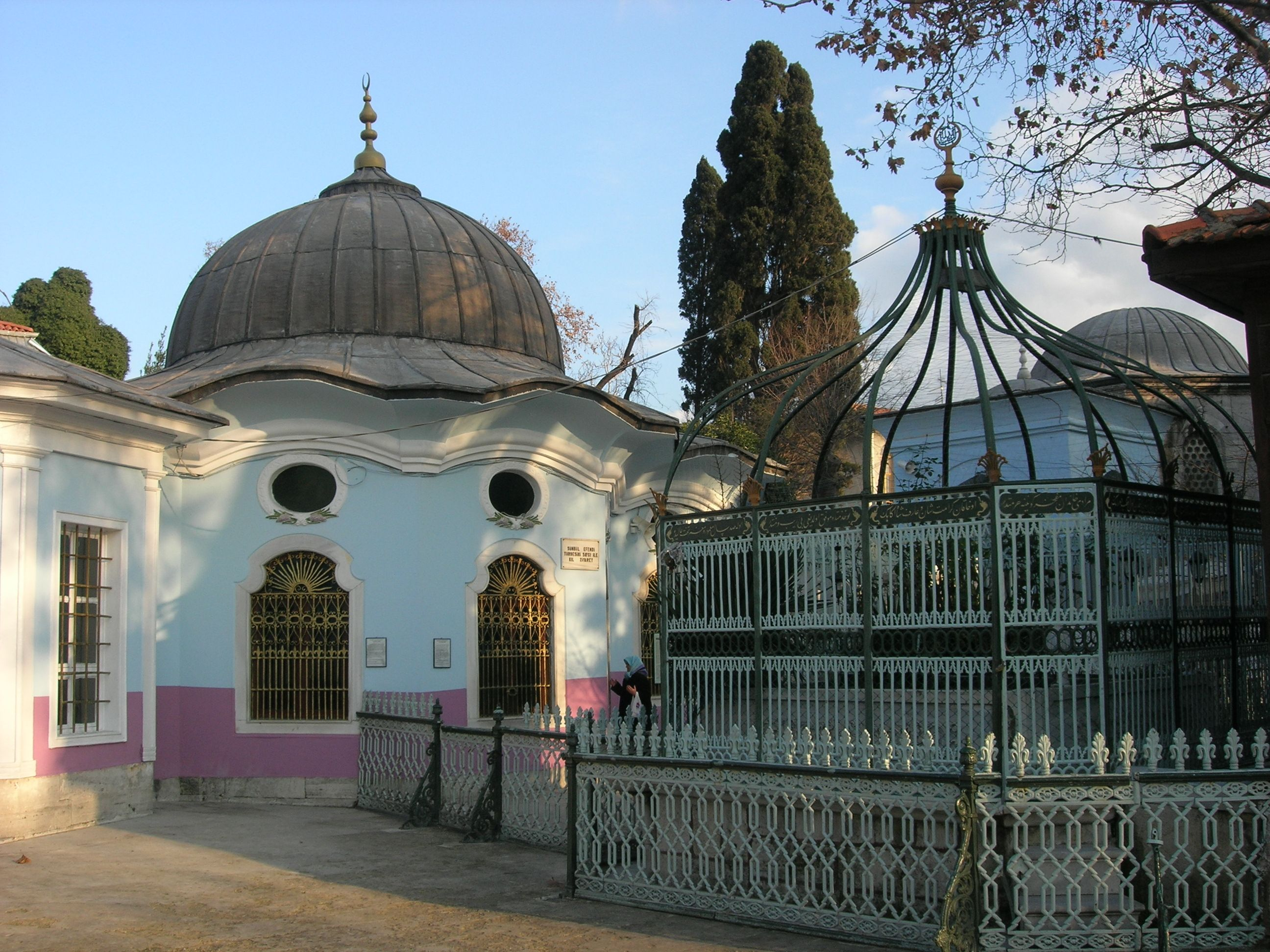
The tomb of Sünbül Efendi in the Koca Mustafa complex in Istanbul.

Sünbül Sinan Efendi (1452 CE, Merzifon – 1529, Istanbul) was the founder of the Sunbuliyye Sufi order (also spelt Sunbuli). The Sunbuliyye were a derivative of the Khalwati (also spelt Halveti and Halvetiye) order. Sünbül Efendi's successors, the next generations were settled in Nurullah town by Konur, Icel Province around 1550.

The tomb of Sümbül Sinan Efendi is next to the Koca Mustafa Pasha Mosque in Istanbul. The site of his tomb was once his Tekke and mosque. The Tekke itself was once a convent that was abandoned and handed over to the Khalwatis by Sultan Bayezid II (1481–1512) to use as a Tekke. Almost all of the sheikhs who sat at the post of grand sheikh of this order are buried at the Tekke, including another noted Sheikh of this order, Merkez Efendi (d.1552) in Yenikapı.

The tomb is frequently visited by Muslims, many of whom consider him to be a saint.

Alternate spellings or transcriptions of this name are: Sümbül Efendi, Sünbül Efendi, Şeyh Sümbül, Sümbül Sinan, and Sünbül Sinan.

Sünbül is the Turkish word for the hyacinth flower which is often purple in color.
