= Manuel Raoul =

Manuel Raoul or Rhales (Greek: Μανουήλ Ῥαούλ or Ῥάλης; fl. ca. 1355–69) was a Byzantine official known through his surviving correspondence with senior Byzantine figures of his time.

Member of an obscure branch of the aristocratic Raoul/Rhales family, Manuel was born possibly at Mystras, but grew up and was educated at Thessalonica. He then served as an official (grammatikos) in the administration of the Despotate of the Morea under Despot Manuel Kantakouzenos until his failing eyesight forced him to resign in ca. 1362. He had a son called Nikephoros.

Twelve of his letters survive, three of which are addressed to Emperor John VI Kantakouzenos, and the rest to other officials, literati, and an abbot. According to the Oxford Dictionary of Byzantium, "[m]ost of the letters are quite conventional in subject matter, but they do provide some prosopographical data and interesting details of everyday life in the 14th-C. Peloponnesos, including the plague of 1361–62, the capture of a friend by bandits, and a fall from a horse that made him lame and prevented him from paying his respects to the emperor".

== Sources ==
- Kazhdan, Alexander, ed. (1991). The Oxford Dictionary of Byzantium. Oxford and New York: Oxford University Press. ISBN 0-19-504652-8.
- Trapp, Erich; Beyer, Hans-Veit; Walther, Rainer; Sturm-Schnabl, Katja; Kislinger, Ewald; Leontiadis, Ioannis; Kaplaneres, Sokrates (1976–1996). Prosopographisches Lexikon der Palaiologenzeit (in German). Vienna: Verlag der Österreichischen Akademie der Wissenschaften. ISBN 3-7001-3003-1.
