= Uşşaki =

Branch of the Khalwatiyya order of Islamic mysticism

Uşşaki (Turkish: Uşşakilik, Ush-Shakilik) is a branch of the Khalwatiyya order of Islamic mysticism, also known as Tasawwuf, founded by Sayyid Hasan Husameddin.

== History ==
The literal translation of the name of the founder of Uşşaki, Hüsameddin, means "sharp sword of the religion". He was born in 880 A.H. (1473 CE) in Bukhara, Uzbekistan. Being the son of a merchant named Hajji Tebaruk, his family lineage extends to Imam Hassan, Caliph Ali, and eventually to the Islamic prophet Muhammad.

Sayyid Hasan Husameddin built the foundation of his Islamic knowledge and his mystic education under his father's supervision. Then, he advanced himself to be a virtuous, well-informed, mature person through an authorized spiritual teacher called Amir Ahmed Semerkand.The death of his father played an important role in his life and he decided to leave the family business to his brother, which was in the eastern city of Erzincan in Turkey.

During this time, he advised the prince Murad of the Ottoman Empire. After becoming the Sultan, Murad, now known as Murad III, insistently invited Husameddin to Istanbul . He accepted the invitation and continued his teachings in Istanbul. Before he became a "perfected teacher" in Tassawuf (Soufism), he met Ibrahim Ummi-Sinan, the leader of the Khalwati path. From him he received the Khilafa title of the Khalwati path, after which Hasan Husameddin founded the Uşşaki path. Although, he was not happy with the attention from the public, with the urge of the Sultan Murad III, he ended up establishing his official Dervish Lodge in Kasımpaşa, Istanbul. He died in Konya aged 121 during the return trip from his last pilgrimage to Mecca in 1001 AH (1593 CE). He is buried in the Uşşaki Dargah, in Kasimpasa.
