= Gulshani =

The Gulshani (Turkish: Gülşenî) is a Halveti sub-order founded by Pir Ibrahim Gulshani, a Turkomen Sufi Sheikh from Eastern Anatolia, who died in Egypt. His family roots reaches to Oguzata shah in Azerbaijan.

When the Ottomans conquered Egypt the Gulshani order became popular with serving soldiers of the Ottoman army in Egypt. The order was later carried back to Diyarbakir and Istanbul where several zawiyas or tekkes were established.

Ibrahim Al-Gulshani is buried at the zawiya in Cairo, which was built in 1519–1524. The building, now abandoned, is included on the World Monuments Fund's 2018 list of monuments at risk.

In Üsküdar at Selamsız, the Gulsheni-Sezai Sufi order was established by Sufis of Romani people in Turkey.
