= Leo Gabalas =

Caesar, Lord of Rhodes and the Cyclades

- Caesar, Lord of Rhodes and the Cyclades
- Rule: ca. 1203 (?) – ca. 1240
- Successor: John Gabalas

Leo Gabalas (Greek: Λέων Γαβαλᾶς) was a Byzantine Greek magnate and independent ruler of a domain, centered on the island of Rhodes and including nearby Aegean islands, which was established in the aftermath of the dissolution of the Byzantine Empire by the Fourth Crusade in 1204. He acknowledged some form of suzerainty by the Empire of Nicaea, but remained virtually independent until his death, sometime in the early 1240s.

== Biography ==
Gabalas belonged to an old aristocratic family, dating at least back to the early 10th century, when Anna Gabala married Emperor Romanos Lekapenos's son and co-ruler Stephen. The family was of relatively low importance thereafter, but produced a series of senior civil and ecclesiastic officials in the 11th and 12th centuries.

Nothing is known of Leo's early life, and he is first securely attested in 1232/3. The origin of Leo's title of "Caesar" and the details of his establishment of control over Rhodes are likewise unclear. Contemporary sources make clear that Rhodes had slipped out of imperial Byzantine control and was held by an independent ruler already at the time of the Fourth Crusade (1203–04). This ruler is usually identified with Leo, but Nikephoros Blemmydes claims that Leo held his title by hereditary right, which may indicate an unknown predecessor who actually seized control of the island. It has been surmised that at some point Leo acknowledged the suzerainty of the Empire of Nicaea, and that the title of Caesar may have been granted by the Nicaean rulers Theodore I Laskaris (ruled 1205–1222) or John III Vatatzes (r. 1221–1254). On the other hand, if he (or a relative) held power on Rhodes since before 1203, the title may have been granted by the Angeloi emperors.

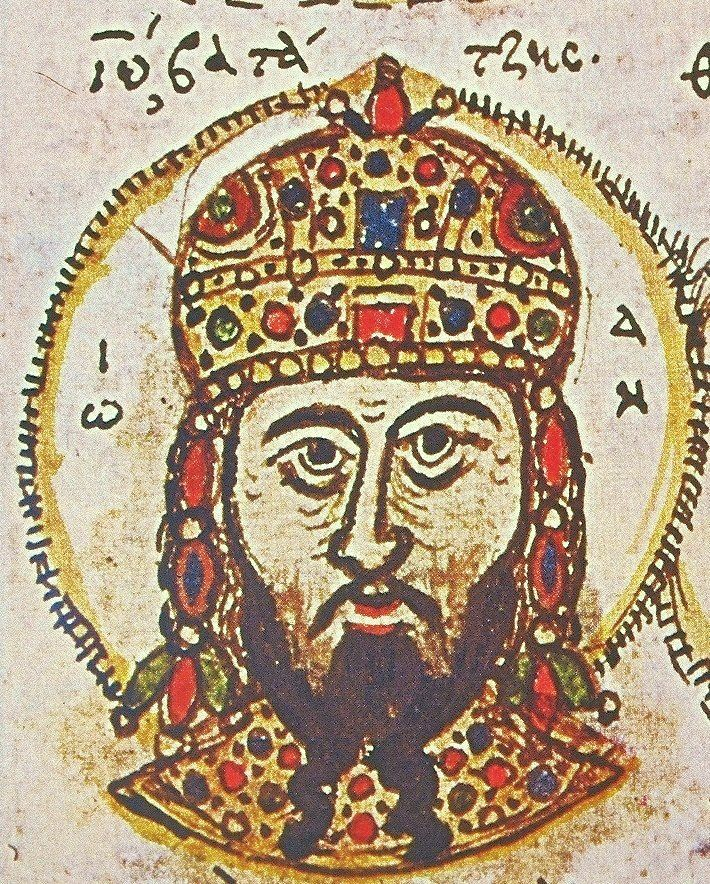
John III Doukas Vatatzes

Whatever the nature of his relations with the Nicaean Empire, it is clear from George Akropolites's account that Gabalas continued to act independently, provoking the ire of Vatatzes, who launched an expedition against Rhodes in 1232/3. It was led by his grand domestic Andronikos Palaiologos and closely supervised by the Emperor himself. The expedition was also accompanied by Blemmydes, who landed on Rhodes with the Nicaean troops. The island was ravaged, and Akropolites presents the expedition as successfully concluded, without giving further details. Nevertheless, Gabalas was apparently left in effective control over Rhodes, since in the very next year (August 1234), he concluded a treaty of alliance with the Venetians. Styling himself as "Caesar" and "Lord of Rhodes and the Cyclades", Gabalas recognized the Doge of Venice as his lord, agreed on mutual assistance against an attack by Vatatzes on their respective domains, and promised assistance in subduing any rebellions on the Venetian colony of Crete. In 1235/6, however, Gabalas joined in Vatatzes's attack on Constantinople, and is even recorded as having fought against the Venetian fleet.

It is unknown when Leo died. He was certainly dead by 1248, when his brother John Gabalas – whom the sources do not call a Caesar but only "Master of Rhodes" – controlled the island and had to call upon the aid of Nicaean troops against a Genoese attack. The Genoese seized the island, and Gabalas family rule over Rhodes ended formally soon thereafter, probably after the final eviction of the Genoese in 1250, when the island became a Nicaean province.

== Coinage ==
The Gabalas brothers issued their own copper coinage, of unknown value or denomination. They were aniconic, and contained only inscriptions, Leo's coins bearing his titles: ΚΑΙϹΑΡ Ο ΓΑΒΑΛΑϹ ("The Caesar Gabalas") on the obverse, and Ο ΔΟVΛΟC ΤΟV ΒΑCΙΛΕ[ΩC] ("Servant of the Emperor") on the reverse.

== Sources ==
- Cheynet, Jean-Claude (1996). Pouvoir et Contestations à Byzance (963–1210) (in French). Paris: Publications de la Sorbonne. ISBN 978-2-85944-168-5.
- Hendy, Michael F. (1999). Catalogue of the Byzantine Coins in the Dumbarton Oaks Collection and in the Whittemore Collection, Volume 4: Alexius I to Michael VIII, 1081–1261 – Part 2: The Emperors of Nicaea and Their Contemporaries (1204–1261). Washington, DC: Dumbarton Oaks Research Library and Collection. ISBN 0-88402-233-1.
- Macrides, Ruth (2007). George Akropolites: The History – Introduction, Translation and Commentary. Oxford: Oxford University Press. ISBN 978-0-19-921067-1.
- Setton, Kenneth M. (1976). The Papacy and the Levant (1204–1571), Volume I: The Thirteenth and Fourteenth Centuries. Vol. 1. Philadelphia: The American Philosophical Society. ISBN 0-87169-114-0.
