= John Gabalas =

Lord of Rhodes, megas doux of the Empire of Nicaea

- Lord of Rhodes, megas doux of the Empire of Nicaea
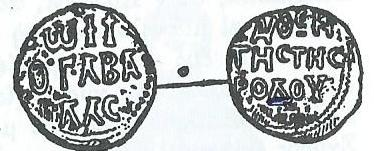
- Coin of John Gabalas
- Rule: ca. 1240 – 1248
- Predecessor: Leo Gabalas
- Successor: Nicaean annexation

John Gabalas (Greek: Ἰωάννης Γαβαλᾶς) was a Byzantine Greek magnate and hereditary ruler of the island of Rhodes in the 1240s. He lost control of the island to the Republic of Genoa in 1248, and called for aid from his suzerain, the Empire of Nicaea. Nicaean troops retook the island, but it was not restored to John's control, becoming a Nicaean province.

== Biography ==
Gabalas belonged to an old aristocratic family, dating at least back to the early 10th century, when Anna Gabala married Emperor Romanos Lekapenos's son and co-ruler Stephen. The family was of relatively low importance thereafter, but produced a series of senior civil and ecclesiastic officials in the 11th and 12th centuries.

Gabalas family rule was established on Rhodes circa 1203, when Byzantine central imperial authority had become weakened, either by John's elder brother Leo Gabalas or by an unnamed relative. John succeeded his brother after the latter's death sometime in the early 1240s. Unlike Leo, who had exercised almost independent authority and even concluded treaties of his own, John was dependent on the Empire of Nicaea. While Leo held the lofty title of "Caesar" and claimed to rule several Aegean islands, John is only attested as "Master of Rhodes". A letter of King Henry I of Cyprus, found in the Vatican Library, appears to refer to John. It addresses him with the titles that he received from the Nicaean emperor, sebastos and megas doux, and indicates that he was an imperial relative by marriage (gambros), probably as a result of a marriage to a Vatatzes lady, which may have taken place already before Leo's death.

Almost nothing else is known of him and his rule except that in 1248, he was with the Nicaean army campaigning against the Latin Empire near Nicomedia, when the Genoese suddenly seized Rhodes. A Nicaean expedition, under the pinkernes John Kantakouzenos, recovered the island in a campaign that probably lasted until 1250. After 1250, Gabalas family rule over Rhodes was terminated formally as well as de facto, and the island became a Nicaean province.

== Coinage ==
The Gabalas brothers issued their own copper coinage, of unknown value or denomination. They were aniconic, and contained only inscriptions, John's coins bearing his name and title: +ΙW[ΑΝΝΗC] Ο ΓΑΒΑΛΑC ("John Gabalas") on the obverse, and Ο ΑVΘΕΝΤΗC ΤΗC ΡΟΔΟV ("The Master of Rhodes") on the reverse. As Alexis Savvides points out, the omission of the formula Ο ΔΟVΛΟC ΤΟV ΒΑCΙΛΕ[ΩC] ("Servant of the Emperor"), that appeared on the coins of Leo, is remarkable, for in reality John's position vis-a-vis the Nicaean emperor was far more subordinate than that of his brother.

== Sources ==
- Cheynet, Jean-Claude (1996). Pouvoir et Contestations à Byzance (963–1210) (in French). Paris: Publications de la Sorbonne. ISBN 978-2-85944-168-5.
- Hendy, Michael F. (1999a). Catalogue of the Byzantine Coins in the Dumbarton Oaks Collection and in the Whittemore Collection, Volume 4: Alexius I to Michael VIII, 1081–1261 – Part 1: Alexius I to Alexius V (1081–1204). Washington, District of Columbia: Dumbarton Oaks Research Library and Collection. ISBN 0-88402-233-1.
- Hendy, Michael F. (1999b). Catalogue of the Byzantine Coins in the Dumbarton Oaks Collection and in the Whittemore Collection, Volume 4: Alexius I to Michael VIII, 1081–1261 – Part 2: The Emperors of Nicaea and Their Contemporaries (1204–1261). Washington, District of Columbia: Dumbarton Oaks Research Library and Collection. ISBN 0-88402-233-1.
- Macrides, Ruth (2007). George Akropolites: The History – Introduction, Translation and Commentary. Oxford: Oxford University Press. ISBN 978-0-19-921067-1.
- Savvides, Alexis (1990). "Η γενουατική κατάληψη της Ρόδου το 1248-1250 μ.Χ.". Παρνασσός (in Greek). 32: 183–199.
