= Nasuhi =

The Nasuhi are a sub-order of the Khalwati Sufi order. Their founder, Pir Nasuhi, was a prolific author who wrote a number of works, including a commentary upon the Qur'an. He died and was buried at his Özbekler Tekkesi in Üsküdar, Istanbul. The order was not a widespread order and had only a number of tekkes in Istanbul and Bursa.

The centre of the Nasuhi order was in Dogancilar, a sub district of Üsküdar, Istanbul, where the grand Sheikh of the order sat at the Nasuhi Tekke.

When Turkey became a republic all tekkes were closed. The Nasuhi tekke was later opened in the form of a mosque, although much of the rear of the tekke complex remains closed to the public. The resting place of Sheikh Nasuhi remains a place of pilgrimage for pious Muslims in Turkey, given he was one of the lesser known Muslim saints in Istanbul (especially in comparison to Aziz Mahmud Hudayi). He is still an important Sheikh in the Khalwati order.
