= Qudusiyah =

Sufi order in Islam

Qudusiyah (Arabic: الْقُدُسِيَّةُ) is a tariqa (Arabic: الطريقة) or Sufi order in Indonesia which was founded in 1968 in Cilegon, Banten.

The murshid (sheikh, spiritual teacher) of the Qudusiyah Order was Suprapto bin Kadis Darmosuharto (1929–2011), known as Suprapto Kadis by his disciples. The position is currently held by Zamzam Tanuwijaya, who received the mandate after Suprapto died.

The name "Qudusiyah" is closely related to the central theme of the teaching of Suprapto, which is to reintroduce and explain the concept of the Ruhul-Qudus (Holy Spirit) as it is written in the Al-Qur'an.

Tariqa Qudusiyah was previously called Tariqa Kadisiyah, a name that was coined by the disciples in the thariqah in reference to the name of the founder. In 2018, Tanuwijaya changed the name of the tariqa to Qudusiyah.
