= Khalwati order =

Sufi mystic order in Sunni Islam

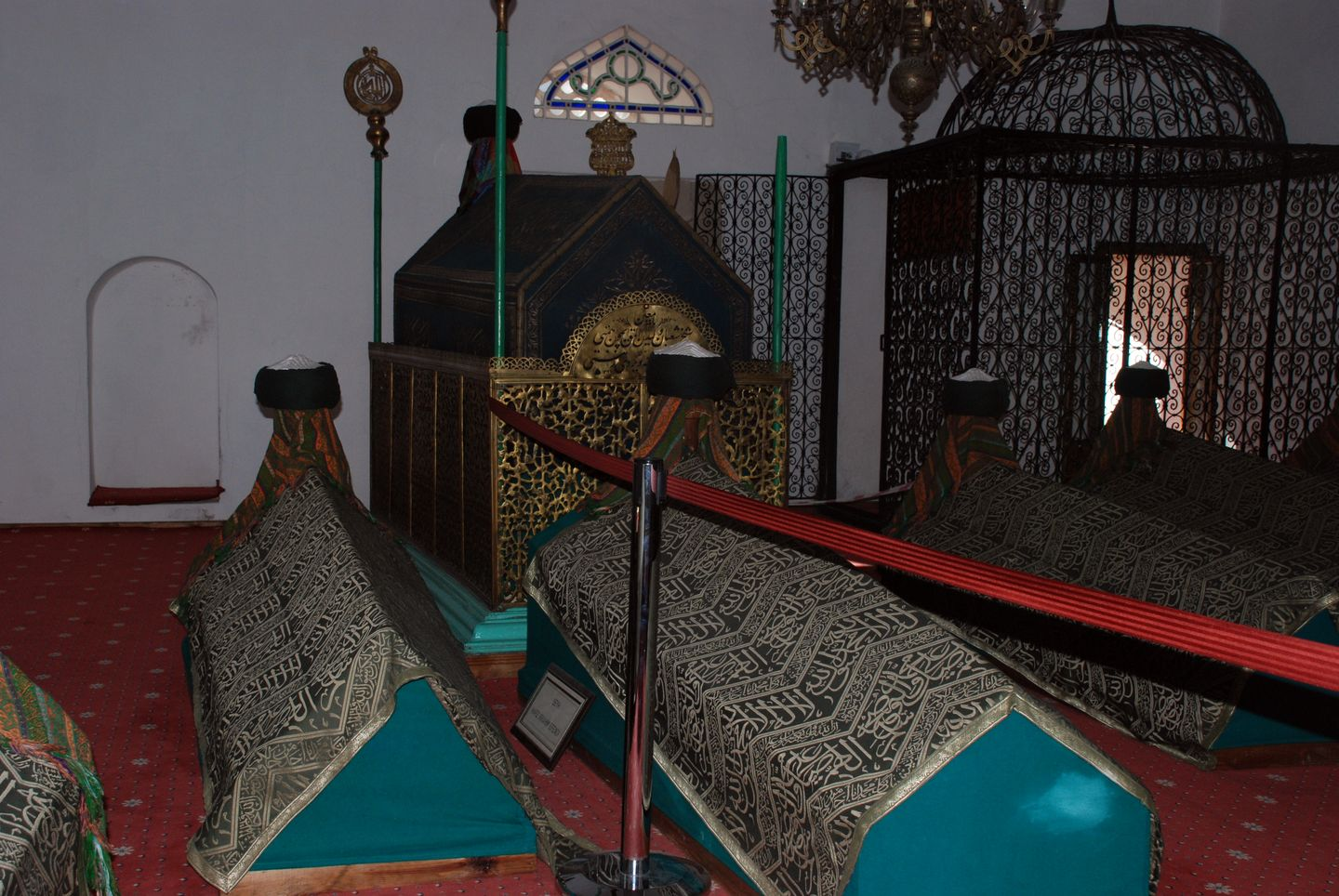
Interior of the türbe of Sheikh Shaban-i Veli in Kastamonu, Turkey

The Khalwati order (also known as Khalwatiyya, Khalwatiya, or Halveti, as it is known in Turkey and Albania) is an Islamic Sufi order (tariqa). It is most widespread in Egypt, Albania, Bosnia, Turkey, and to a lesser extent, Azerbaijan. The order takes its name from the Arabic word khalwa, meaning hermitage. The order emerged from the Safavi-Bektashi milieu and underwent Sunnification under the Ottomans. It was founded by Muhammad-Nur al-Khalwati, and his son Umar al-Khalwati, around the city of Herat in medieval Khorasan (now located in western Afghanistan). It was Umar's disciple, Yahya Shirvani however, who founded the “Khalwati Way” as a practice. Yahya Shirvani wrote Wird al-Sattar, a devotional text read by the members of nearly all the branches of Khalwatiyya.

The Khalwati order is known for its strict ritual training of its dervishes and its emphasis of individualism, their poetry is also notable for being influenced by Hurufis like Naimi and Nesimi. Historically, the order promoted individual asceticism (zuhd) and hermitage (khalwa), differentiating themselves from other orders at the time. The order is known as one of the source schools of many other Sufi orders.

== History ==
=== Origins ===
The Khalwati has two lineages, but it is safe to say that it goes back to Ali, Hasan and Husayn, most likely via the Basran or Baghdadi tradition, out of which the Khorasani Khwajagan generation eventually emerged, the most famous of which being Yusuf Hamadani, Abu al-Hassan al-Kharaqani and Abu Ali Farmadi, from which the students of Ahmad Yasawi taught Zahed Gilani, who then ultimately went on to be the teacher of Muhammad-Nur al-Khalwati and Umar al-Khalwati; the Khwajagan also often connected to Bayazid Bastami, whom the Khalwati have special reverence for.

The lineages of the order are also very frequently linked to the Malamatiyya in some way, and their traditions of khalwa and malamah are believed to be directly related.

=== Sectarianism and the establishment of the Khalwati order ===
Due to the dual lineage of Khalwatis, their early history is heavily disputed, especially due to them being split into Sunni and Shia, with Sunnis generally favoring the Basrid lineage, and Shias favoring the Baghdadi lineage, due to it being connected to Ali al-Rida, as well as the previous Shia imams.

A popular narrative dictates that the orders practice emerged upon the death of Umar al-Khalwati after having died from 40 days in fasting and seclusion. The practice of seclusion in virtually all Sufi orders is traced to at least one Khalwati pir present in their lineage. Despite the authority of Muhammad-Nur al-Khalwati, Umar al-Khalwati is usually considered its founder, or the "first pir". Umar- Khalwati was considered a cryptic and mysterious man who was not very well known and did very little to spread the ordm:ner. Shaykh Yahya Shirvani is considered "the second pir" and was himself the primary person responsible for the spread of the Khalwati order.

Yahya Shirvani lived during a time of great political instability in the wake of the Mongol invasion. After the Mongol invasions, Turkish nomads began to gather into urban centers of the Islamic world. All these cities had Sufi shaykhs performing miracles for the nomads. Thus, these Turkish nomads were easily converted to mystical Islam when the Sufi shaykhs promised them union with Allah. Yahya Shirvani entered Baku at this time of religious fervor and political instability, and he was able to start a movement. Yahya Shirvani was able to gather ten thousand people to his movement. Yahya had many popular, charismatic disciples to spread the order, including Pir Ilyas.

=== Under the Ottomans ===
The time of greatest popularity for Khalwati order was during the thirty-year reign of Sultan Bayazid II (1481–1511) in Ottoman Turkey after undergoing sunnification. During this time, the sultan practiced Sufi rituals which, without a doubt, brought in many people to the order, who wanted to advance their political career. This is the time period where members of the upper class, Ottoman military, and higher ranks of civil services were all involved with the Khalwati order. The Sufi sheikh, Chelebi Khalifa, moved the headquarters of the Khalwati order from Amasya to Istanbul. Here, they rebuilt a former church into a tekke, or Sufi lodge. The tekke became known as the Koca Mustafa Pasha Mosque. These buildings spread throughout the region as Khalwati's popularity grew. The order spread from its origins in the Central Asia and Azerbaijan to the Balkans, especially in Greece, Kosovo and North Macedonia, to Egypt, Sudan and almost all corners of the Ottoman Empire.

=== The period of Sunbul Efendi ===
After Chelebi Khalifa's death, the power was passed to his son-in-law, Sunbul Efendi. He was considered a very spiritual man that saved the Koca Mustafa Pasha Mosque. According to the miraculous account, the new sultan Selim I, was suspicious of the Khalwati order and wanted to destroy its tekke. Selim I sent workers to tear down the tekke, but an angry Sunbul Efendi turned them away. Hearing this, Selim I went down there himself only to see hundreds of silent dervishes gathered around Shaykh Sunbul dressed with his khirqa. Selim was astonished by Sunbul's spiritual power and canceled the plans to destroy the tekke.

The attacks from the ulama, the orthodox religious class, were more serious in the long run. Their hostility were on many Sufi orders, not just the Khalwatiya. Their criticism was a political concern, which suggested that they Khalwatis were disloyal to the Ottoman state, and a doctrinal concern, that the Sufis were thought by the ulama to be too close to folk Islam and too far from the shari'a. The ulama also held a cultural hostility towards them, which made the ulama intolerant of the Sufis.

=== The periods of the Wali Shaʿban-i Kastamoni and ʿOmer el-Fu'ad-i, and the Kadizadeli movement ===
The order began to transform itself over the course of the 16th and 17th centuries as it became more embedded in Ottoman social and religious life. A good example of this is the branch of the order founded by Shaʿban-i Veli (d. 1569) in Kastamonu. Whereas Shaʿban was a retiring ascetic who kept a low profile in the 16th century, by the 17th century his spiritual follower ʿOmer el-Fu'adi (d. 1636) wrote multiple books and treatises that sought to cement the order's doctrines and practices, in addition to combatting a growing anti-Sufi feeling that later took shape in the form of the Kadizadeli movement. Also during this period, the order sought to reassert its Sunni identity, by disassociating itself with the Shi’i enemy. With the reign of Sulayman the Magnificent and Selim II the order entered a revival. They had links with many high-ranking officials in the Ottoman administration and received substantial donations in cash and property, which helped to recruit more members.

=== The influences of Niyazi al-Misri ===
By this time, members of the Khalwati order broke ties with the common people, who they previously aligned themselves so closely. They attempted to rid the order of folk Islam to a more orthodox order. The Khalwati was very conscious of their public image and wanted the order to become more of an exclusive membership for the upper class. From here, the Khalwati order broke off into many suborders. In 1650s rose one of the most famous Anatolian Khalwati shaykhs, Niyazi al-Misri. Niyazi was famous for his poetry, his spiritual powers, and public opposition to the government. He was a leader that represented the old Khalwati order, one for the masses. Niyazi gave the common people and their spiritual aspirations a voice again in the Khalwati order. Niyazi's poetry demonstrates some of the Khalwati's aspects of retreat. He writes in one of his poems:

"I thought that in the world no friend was left for me--
I left myself, and lo, no fiend was left for me"

=== Revival of the Khalwati ===
Most scholars believe that the Khalwati themselves went through a major revival during the 18th century when Mustafa ibn Kamal ad-Din al-Bakri (1688–1748) was in charge. Al-Bakri was considered a great shaykh who wrote many books, invented Sufi techniques, and was very charismatic. He travelled throughout Jerusalem, Aleppo, Istanbul, Baghdad, and Basra. Before he died he wrote 220 books, mostly about adab. It is said that he saw the prophet nineteen times and al-Khidr three times. In many cities, people would mob al-Bakri to receive his blessing. After al-Bakri died, Khalwati dome scholars believe that al-Bakri set “a great Sufi renaissance in motion.” He was considered the reformer who renewed the Khalwati order in the Egypt. The Khalwati order still remains strong in Egypt where the Sufi orders do receive a degree of support from the government. The Khalwati order also remains strong in the Sudan.

However, not all scholars agree with al-Bakri's influence. Frederick de Jong argues in his collected studies that al Bakri's influence was limited. He argues that many scholars speak of his influence, but without much detail about what he actually did. Jong argues that al-Bakri's influence was limited to adding a prayer litany to the Khalwati rituals. He made his disciples read this litany before sunrise and called it the Wird al-sahar. Al-Bakri wrote this prayer litany himself and thought it necessary to add it to the practices of the Khalwati order. Jong argues al-Bakri should not be attributed with the revival of the Sufi order for his limited effect.

After the influence of al-Bakri faded, the Khalwati order began gradually splitting into popular break-off branches, which were led by figures such as Ismail Haqqi Bursevi, Aziz Mahmud Hudayi, Mustafa Gaibi, Mustafa Devati, Osman Fazli and Shaban Veli, whom are nonetheless still highly esteemed and venerated by mainstream Khalwati followers.

== 19th-century political influence ==
Members of the Khalwati order were involved in political movements by playing a huge role in the Urabi insurrection in Egypt. The order helped others oppose British occupation in Egypt. The Khalwati groups in Upper Egypt protested British occupation due to high taxes and unpaid labor, which, in addition to drought, made living very hard in the 1870s. Their protests blended with the large stream nationalist protests that lead up to the Urabi insurrection. It can be said that the Khalwati's fight to improve living conditions eventually lead to the larger nationalist protests.

== 20th century to modern day ==
The situation varies from region to region. In 1945, the government in Albania recognized the principal tariqas as independent religious communities, but this came to an end after the Albanian Cultural Revolution in 1967. In 1939 there were twenty-five Khalwatiyya tekkes in Albania, Macedonia and Kosovo. In 1925 the orders were abolished in Turkey and all tekkes and zawiyas were closed and their possessions confiscated by the government, and there is no data available on the status of the Khalwatiyya. In Egypt there are still many active branches of the Khalwatiyya.

Modernity has affected the orders to have quite different forms in different environments. They vary depending on the locality, personality of the shaykh and the needs of the community. There may also be different prayer practices, patterns of association, and the nature of relations linking the disciples to the shaykh and to each other.

In the contemporary period, the practice and idea of khalwa (spiritual retreat) have been reinterpreted in diverse ways beyond traditional Sufi ṭarīqa frameworks. While classical Khalwati practice emphasized prolonged solitude under the guidance of a shaykh, modern adaptations often focus on inner reflection, ethical self-cultivation, and psychological well-being within broader philosophical or spiritual contexts. These contemporary approaches tend to be less institutionalized, more inclusive, and responsive to modern social conditions, illustrating how Khalwati-inspired concepts continue to evolve while remaining connected to their historical roots.

== Khalwati tekkes ==
The Khalwati order had many tekkes in Istanbul, the most famous being the Jerrahi, Ussaki, Sunbuli, Ramazani and Nasuhi. Although the Sufi orders are now abolished in the Republic of Turkey, the above are almost all now mosques and/or places of visitation by Muslims for prayer.

=== Active branches in the Ottoman era ===
- Pîr İlyas Amâsî branch
- Seyyid Yâhyâ-yı Şirvânî branch
  - Molla Hâbib Karamanî sub-branch
  - Cemâli’îyye sub-branch (Followers of Çelebi Hâlife Cemâl-i Halvetî)
    - Sünbül’îyye
    - Assâl’îyye
    - Bahş’îyye
    - Şâbân’îyye
      - Karabaş’îyye
        - Bekr’îyye
          - Kemal’îyye
          - Hufn’îyye
            - Tecân’îyye
            - Dırdîr’îyye
            - Sâv’îyye
          - Semmân’îyye
            - Feyz’îyye
        - Nasûh’îyye
          - Çerkeş’îyye
            - İbrahim’îyye/Kuşadav’îyye
          - Halîl’îyye
  - Ahmed’îyye sub-branch (Followers of Yiğitbaşı Ahmed Şemseddîn bin Îsâ Marmarâvî)
    - Ramazan’îyye
      - Buhûr’îyye
      - Cerrah’îyye
      - Raûf’îyye
    - Cihângir’îyye
    - Sinan’îyye
    - Muslih’îyye
    - Zeherr’îyye
    - Hayât’îyye
    - Uşşâk’îyye
      - Câhid’îyye
      - Selâh’îyye
    - Niyâz’îyye/Mısr’îyye
    - Beyûm’îyye
  - Rûşen’îyye sub-branch (Followers of Dede Ömer-i Rûşenî)
    - Gülşen’îyye
      - Sezâ’îyye
      - Hâlet’îyye
    - Demirtâş’îyye
  - Şems’îyye sub-branch (Followers of Şemseddîn Ahmed Sivâsî)

== Khalwati practices ==
The hallmark of the Khalwatiyya tariqa way, and its numerous subdivisions is its periodic retreat (khalwa) that is required of every novice. These can last between three days to forty days. The khalwa for some offshoots of the Khalwatiyya is essential in preparing the pupil, murid. The collective dhikr follows similar rules throughout the different branches of the Khalwatiyya order. The practice of dhikr is described as repetitive prayer. The practitioner is to be repeating Allah's name and remembering Allah. The dervish is to be attentive to Allah in their repetitive prayer. They are to be completely focused on Allah, so much so that an early Sufi master says "True dhikr is that you forget your dhikr." Another practice that distinguishes the Khalwatiyya from other tariqas is that for them it is through participation in the communal rites and rituals that one reaches a more advanced stage of awareness, one that the theorists of the order described as a face-to-face encounter with Allah.

== Lineage ==
The following are two commonly cited spiritual chains (silsilas) tracing back to Prophet Muhammad:

1. Muḥammad
2. Alī ibn Abī Ṭālib
3. Hasan ibn Ali
4. Husayn ibn Ali
5. Ḥasan al-Baṣrī
6. Ḥabīb al-ʿAjamī
7. Dāwūd al-Ṭāʾī
8. Maʿrūf al-Karkhī
9. Sari al-Saqaṭī
10. Jūnayd al-Baghdādī
11. Mumshād al-Dīnawarī
12. Muḥammad al-Bakrī
13. Qaḍī Wajīh al-Dīn ʿUmar al-Bakrī
14. Abū al-Najīb al-Suhrawardī
15. Ahmad Ghazali
16. Quṭb al-Dīn al-Abharī
17. Rukn al-Dīn al-Najāshī
18. Shihāb al-Dīn al-Tabrīzī
19. Khwājah Jamāl al-Dīn al-Shīrāzī
20. Zāhed Gilānī
21. Muḥammad ibn Nūr al-Khalwatī
22. ʿUmar al-Khalwatī

Another version of the spiritual lineage is as follows:

1. Muḥammad
2. Alī ibn Abī Ṭālib
3. Ḥasan ibn Alī
4. Ḥusayn ibn Alī
5. Zayn al-ʿAbidīn
6. Muḥammad al-Baqir
7. Jāfar as-Sādiq
8. Mûsa al-Kâzim
9. Alī ar-Rida
10. Maʿrūf al-Karkhī
11. Sari al-Saqaṭī
12. Jūnayd al-Baghdâdî
13. Abū Bakr al-Shiblī
14. Abū Saʿīd ibn al-Aʿrābī
15. Abū ʿAlī al-Kātib
16. Abu Uthman al-Maghribi
17. Abu al-Qasim Gurgani
18. Abu al-Hassan al-Kharaqani
19. Abu Ali Farmadi
20. Arystan Baba
21. Yusuf Hamadani
22. Ahmed Yesevi
23. Shaykh Luqman Perende
24. Zāhed Gilānī
25. Muḥammad ibn Nūr al-Khalwatī
26. ʿUmar al-Khalwatī

== sub-orders ==
- Gulshani
- Jelveti
- Jerrahi
- Nasuhi
- Rahmani
- Sunbuli
- Ussaki

== See also ==
- Naqshbandi
- Bayrami
