= John Raoul Petraliphas =

John Komnenos Raoul Doukas Angelos Petraliphas (Greek: Ἱωάννης Κομνηνός Ῥαούλ Δούκας Ἄγγελος Πετραλίφας; died c. 1274) was a Byzantine noble and military commander during the reign of Emperor Michael VIII Palaiologos (r. 1259–1282).

== Life ==
John Raoul Petraliphas was the eldest son of Alexios Raoul and an unnamed niece of the Emperor of Nicaea John III Vatatzes (r. 1221–1254). He had three other brothers, of which two are known by name, the pinkernes Manuel and Isaac. The Raoul, as all families of the traditional aristocracy, suffered under Theodore II Laskaris (r. 1254–1258) who sought to reduce the nobility's power and influence. Laskaris instead favoured men of humble origin, chief among them the Mouzalon brothers. One of John's sisters was married to the emperor's protégé, George Mouzalon, while John and his brothers were imprisoned (the exact date is not clear).

Consequently, the family actively supported the murder the Mouzalon brothers in 1258, following Theodore II's death. After the subsequent usurpation of Michael VIII Palaiologos (r. 1259–1282), they were rewarded with high state offices: following his military successes in the next few years, John was named protovestiarios, inheriting the title from George Mouzalon. In 1259, Michael sent John along with John Palaiologos and Alexios Strategopoulos in a campaign against the Epirote-Achaean alliance in Macedonia, which ended with the decisive Nicaean victory at the Battle of Pelagonia. Following the victory, Strategopoulos and Raoul marched into Epirus, seizing Arta and besieging Ioannina. Their achievements, however, were quickly undone by John Doukas, the bastard son of the Epirote ruler. Nothing further is known of him, except that he died c. 1274.

== Family ==
In 1261, John married Theodora Palaiologina Kantakouzene, the niece of Michael VIII and widow of George Mouzalon. With her, he had at least two daughters, Irene and Anna. Irene married the porphyrogennetos Constantine Palaiologos, the third son of Michael VIII.

== Sources ==
- Kazhdan, Alexander, ed. (1991). The Oxford Dictionary of Byzantium. Oxford and New York: Oxford University Press. ISBN 0-19-504652-8.
- Macrides, Ruth (2007). George Akropolites: The History – Introduction, Translation and Commentary. Oxford: Oxford University Press. ISBN 978-0-19-921067-1.
- Nicol, Donald M. (1994). "Theodora Raoulaina, Nun and Scholar, c. 1240–1300". The Byzantine Lady: Ten Portraits, 1250–1500. Cambridge and New York: Cambridge University Press. pp. 33–47. ISBN 0-521-45531-6.
- Polemis, Demetrios I. (1968). The Doukai: A Contribution to Byzantine Prosopography. London: The Athlone Press.
- Vougiouklaki, Penelope (2003). "John Raoul". Encyclopedia of the Hellenic World, Asia Minor. Foundation of the Hellenic World.
