= Protovestiarios =

Byzantine court position

Protovestiarios (Greek: πρωτοβεστιάριος, lit. 'first vestiarios') was a high Byzantine court position, originally reserved for eunuchs. In the late Byzantine period (12th–15th centuries), it denoted the Empire's senior-most financial official, and was also adopted by the medieval Serbian state as protovestiyar (прото-вестијар).

== History and functions ==
The title is first attested in 412, as the comes sacrae vestis, an official in charge of the Byzantine emperor's "sacred wardrobe" (Latin: sacra vestis), coming under the praepositus sacri cubiculi. In Greek, the term used was oikeiakon vestiarion (οἰκειακόν βεστιάριον, "private wardrobe"), and by this name it remained known from the 7th century onward. As such, the office was distinct from the public or imperial wardrobe, the basilikon vestiarion, which was entrusted to a state official, the chartoularios tou vestiariou. The private wardrobe also included part of the Byzantine emperor's private treasury, and controlled an extensive staff.

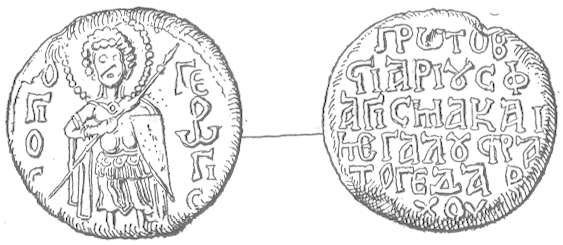
Seal of an anonymous, Palaiologan-era protovestiarios and megas stratopedarches

Consequently, the holders of this office came second only to the parakoimomenos in court hierarchy, functioning as the latter's aides. Until the 11th century, it was reserved for eunuchs, but in the 9th–11th centuries, several protovestiarioi were appointed as generals and ambassadors. In the 11th century, the title rose further in importance, eclipsing the kouropalates; transformed into an honorary title, it also began being given to non-eunuchs, including members of the imperial family. As such, the title survived until the late Palaiologan period, its holders including high-ranking ministers and future emperors. The mid-14th century Book of Offices of Pseudo-Kodinos lists the rank in the sixth place in the palace hierarchy, between the panhypersebastos and the megas doux. The insignia of the protovestiarios as a golden and green staff of office (dikanikion) with gold and coloured glass, green shoes and a green mantle (tamparion), and a green saddle with gold braid similar to the panhypersebastos.

The female equivalent was the protovestiaria (Greek: πρωτοβεστιαρία), the head of the empress' servants. Protovestiarioi are also attested for private citizens, in which case again the title refers to their head servant and treasurer.

=== Notable protovestiarioi ===
- Constantine Leichoudes, later patriarch 1059–63, as Constantine III
- Andronikos Doukas (fl. 1071–77), served Romanos IV and Michael VII
- Alexios Raoul, under John III Vatatzes
- George Mouzalon, chief minister of Theodore II Laskaris and short-lived regent
- Alexios V Doukas, briefly emperor in 1204
- John III Vatatzes, Emperor of Nicaea 1222–54
- Michael Tarchaneiotes, nephew of Michael VIII Palaiologos and general
- Michael Apsaras, chief minister of Despot of Epirus, Thomas Preljubović

== In Serbia ==
The title was also adopted in the medieval Serbian states as protovestijar (Serbian Cyrillic: протовестијар/протовистијар, archaic: протовистіар), and likewise entailed fiscal responsibilities, being the equivalent to a "finance minister". According to historian John V. A. Fine, Jr., "The chief financial official responsible for the state treasury and its income was the protovestijar. This position was regularly held by a merchant from Kotor who understood financial management and bookkeeping. Both protovestijars and logothetes were used as diplomats, the protovestijars in particular being sent west, for as citizens of Kotor they knew Italian and Latin."

It was mentioned during the rule of King Stefan Uroš I (r. 1243–1276). Stefan Dušan (r. 1331–55) elevated the nobility and clergy when crowned Emperor; komornik Nikola Buća from Kotor was appointed protovestijar. The power of the protovestijar is best testified by the proverb derived from Nikola Buća: "Car da – al Buća ne da" (The Emperor gives, but Buća does not). The Buća family produced several protovestijars, including Nikola's nephew Trifun Mihajlov Buća (fl. 1357), one of the most important people in his time, who served Emperor Dušan's successor Uroš V.

== Bosnia ==
Tvrtko I (Ban of Bosnia, 1353–77, King 1377—1391) added the ranks logotet and protovestijar after the Serbian model after crowning himself King. Tvrtko's first protovestijar was a Ragusan, kapedan Ratko, elevated in 1378. Brailo Tezalović (fl. 1392–1433) was a Bosnian knez and merchant, nobleman and diplomat, who served Bosnian magnate Pavle Radinović and his family, with the titles of carinik (customs official).

== Zeta ==
Balša II (Lord of Zeta, 1378–85), added the rank into service after taking Durrazzo in spring 1385, appointing Filip Bareli.

== Principality of Achaea ==
The title of protovestiarios was also adopted in the Frankish Principality of Achaea, where it designated an office equivalent to a Western chamberlain and charged with keeping the list of fief-holders. This office was often given to native Greeks.

== See also ==
- Vestararius, papal office derivative of the protovestiarios
- Logothetes ton oikeiakon

== Sources ==
- Blagojević, Miloš (2001), Državna uprava u srpskim srednjovekovnim zemljama (in Serbian), Službeni list SRJ, ISBN 9788635504971
- Bon, Antoine (1969). La Morée franque. Recherches historiques, topographiques et archéologiques sur la principauté d'Achaïe (in French). Paris: De Boccard.
- Bury, John Bagnell (1911). The Imperial Administrative System of the Ninth Century - With a Revised Text of the Kletorologion of Philotheos. London: Oxford University Press.
- Fine, John Van Antwerp (1994). The Late Medieval Balkans: A Critical Survey from the Late Twelfth Century to the Ottoman Conquest. Ann Arbor: University of Michigan Press. ISBN 978-0-472-08260-5.
- Gibbon, Edward (1860). The History of the Decline and Fall of the Roman Empire. New York, New York: Harper & Brothers.
- Haldon, John F. (1997). Byzantium in the Seventh Century: The Transformation of a Culture. Cambridge, United Kingdom: Cambridge University Press. ISBN 978-0-521-31917-1.
- Holmes, Catherine (2005). Basil II and the Governance of Empire (976–1025). Oxford, United Kingdom: Oxford University Press. ISBN 978-0-19-927968-5.
- Kalezić, Danilo (1970). Kotor (in Croatian). Grafički zavod Hrvatske.
- Kazhdan, Alexander, ed. (1991). "Protovestiarios". The Oxford Dictionary of Byzantium. New York and Oxford: Oxford University Press. p. 1749. ISBN 978-0-19-504652-6.
- Novaković, Stojan (1966), Iz srpske istorije (in Serbian), Matica srpska
- Verpeaux, Jean, ed. (1966). Pseudo-Kodinos, Traité des Offices (in French). Paris: Centre National de la Recherche Scientifique.
- Vizantološki institut (2004). Zbornik radova, Volume 41–42 (in Serbian). Belgrade: Vizantološki institut (Srpska akademija nauka i umetnosti).
