= List of Sufi saints =

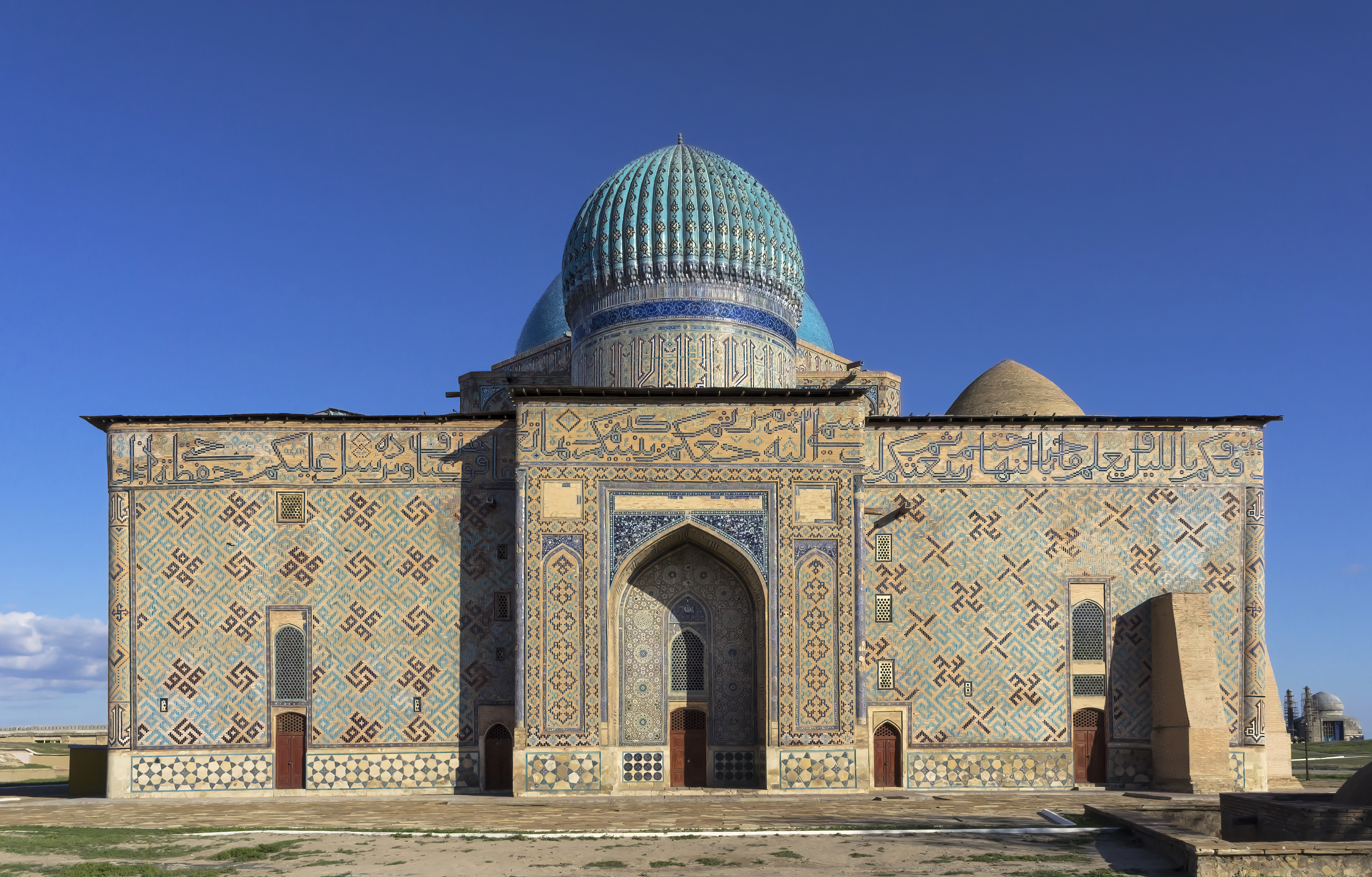
The mausoleum of Ahmad Yasawi who was also considered a Sufi saint and poet in Turkistan, current day Kazakhstan.

Sufi saints or wali (Arabic: ولي, plural ʾawliyāʾ أولياء) played an instrumental and foregrounding role in spreading Islam throughout the world. In the traditional Islamic view, a saint is portrayed as someone "marked by [special] divine favor ... [and] holiness", and who is specifically "chosen by God and endowed with exceptional gifts, such as the ability to work miracles."

== List of Sufi Saints ==
=== 8th century (701–800 AD) ===
Name	Sufi Order	Born / Death year	Region
Hasan al-Basri		b. 642 – d. 728 AD	Basra, Iraq
Habib al-Ajami		d. 738 AD	Basra, Iraq
Rabi'a al-Adawiyya		b. c. 714 – d. 801 AD*	Basra, Iraq
Dawud Tai		d. c. 777–782 AD	Kufa / Baghdad, Iraq
Ibrahim ibn Adham		d. c. 777–782 AD	Balkh (present-day Afghanistan) / Syria
Abu Sulayman al-Darani		b. 726 – d. 815 AD*	Damascus, Syria
al-Fudayl ibn Iyad		d. 803 AD*	Khorasan / Mecca
Shaqiq al-Balkhi		d. 810 AD*	Balkh (present-day Afghanistan)
Abdullah Shah Ghazi		d. 720 AD	Karachi

=== 9th century (801–900 AD) ===
Name	Sufi Order	Born / Death year	Region
Bishr al-Hafi		d. 841 AD	Baghdad, Iraq
Sari al-Saqati		d. 867 AD	Baghdad, Iraq
Bayazid Bastami		b. 804 – d. 874/875 AD	Bistam, Iran
Harith al-Muhasibi		b. 781 – d. 857 AD	Baghdad, Iraq
Junayd of Baghdad		b. c. 830 – d. 910 AD*	Baghdad, Iraq
Abu Bakr al-Shibli		b. 861 – d. 945 AD*	Baghdad, Iraq
Sahl al-Tustari		b. 818 – d. 896 AD	Shushtar, Iran
Abu Yazid (Bayazid) Bastami		b. 804 – d. 874 AD	Bistam, Iran
Shaqiq al-Balkhi		d. 810 AD	Balkh, Afghanistan
Ma'ruf al-Karkhi		d. 815 AD	Baghdad, Iraq

=== 10th century (901–1000 AD) ===
Name	Sufi Order	Born / Death year	Region
Abu Ishaq Shami	Chishti Order	d. 940 AD	Mount Qasioun, Syria
Junayd of Baghdad		b. c. 830 – d. 910 AD	Baghdad, Iraq
Abu Bakr al-Shibli		b. 861 – d. 945 AD	Baghdad, Iraq
Abu Nasr al-Sarraj		d. 988 AD	Tus, Iran
Abu Talib al-Makki		d. 996 AD	Baghdad, Iraq
Muhammad ibn al-Fadl al-Balkhi		d. 931 AD	Balkh, Afghanistan
Ibn Khafif		b. 882 – d. 982 AD	Shiraz, Iran
Hamdun al-Qassar		d. 884 AD*	Nishapur, Iran
Abu al-Husayn al-Nuri		d. 907 AD	Baghdad, Iraq

=== 11th century (1001–1100 AD) ===
Name	Sufi Order	Born / Death year	Region
Abu Sa'id Abu'l-Khayr		b. 967 – d. 1049 AD	Miana, Iran
Al-Qushayri		b. 986 – d. 1072 AD	Nishapur, Iran
Al-Ghazali		b. 1058 – d. 1111 AD*	Tus, Iran
Ahmad Ghazali		b. c. 1061 – d. 1123/1126 AD	Qazvin, Iran
Ali Hujwiri (Data Ganj Bakhsh)		b. c. 1009 – d. c. 1072/1077 AD	Lahore, Pakistan
Abu Ali al-Daqqaq		d. 1015 AD	Nishapur, Iran
Abu al-Hassan al-Kharaqani		b. c. 963 – d. 1033 AD	Semnan Province, Iran
Imam Abu al-Qasim al-Qushayri		b. 986 – d. 1072 AD	Nishapur, Iran
Yusuf Hamdani	(Proto-Naqshbandi / Khwajagan)	b. 1062 – d. 1141 AD*	Merv / Herat
Abu Hamza al-Baghdadi		d. 1019 AD	Baghdad, Iraq
Abu al-Fadl Muhammad ibn Hasan al-Khazin		d. 1033 AD	Damascus, Syria
Baba Kuhi of Shiraz		b. 948 – d. 1037 AD	
Haji Huud		b. 1025 – d. 1141 AD	Patan
Imam Ali-ul-Haq		b. 925 – d. 971 AD	Sialkot

=== 12th century (1101–1200 AD) ===
Name	Sufi Order	Born / Death year	Region
Abdul Qadir Gilani	Qadiriyya	b. 1077 – d. 1166 AD	Baghdad, Iraq
Abdul Khaliq Ghajadwani	(Khwajagan / proto-Naqshbandi)	d. 1179 AD	Bukhara, Uzbekistan
Ahmad Yasawi	(Yasawiyya)	b. c. 1093 – d. 1166 AD	Turkistan, Kazakhstan
Moinuddin Chishti	Chishti Order	b. c. 1141 – d. 1230 AD*	Ajmer, India
Qutbuddin Bakhtiar Kaki	Chishti Order	b. 1173 – d. 1235 AD*	Delhi, India
Fariduddin Ganjshakar	Chishti	b. 1188 – d. 1280 AD	Pakpattan, Pakistan
Alauddin Sabir Kaliyari	Chishti (Sabiri branch)	b. 1196 – d. 1291 AD*	Haridwar, India
Attar of Nishapur		b. c. 1145 – d. 1221 AD*	Nishapur, Iran
Abu al-Najib Suhrawardi	Suhrawardiyya	b. 1097 – d. 1168 AD	Iraq / Persia
Amir Kulal	(Khwajagan)	b. 1278 – d. 1370 AD*	Bukhara, Uzbekistan
Abu Hafs Umar al-Suhrawardi	Suhrawardiyya	b. 1145 – d. 1234 AD*	Baghdad, Iraq
Lal Shahbaz Qalandar		b. 1177 – d. 1274 AD*	Sehwan Sharif, Pakistan
Shah Gardez		b. 1026 – d. 1152 AD	

=== 13th century (1200–1299 AD) ===
Name	Sufi Order	Born / Death year	Region
Abdul Razzaq Gilani	Qadiriyya	b. 1134 – d. 1207 AD	Baghdad
Abu al-Abbas al-Mursi		b. 1219 – d. 1287 AD	Anfoushi
Adam Khaki		14th-century AD	Badarpur
Ahmad al-Badawi		b. 1200 – d. 1276 AD	Ahmad Al-Badawi Mosque
Alauddin Sabir Kaliyari	Chishti	b. 1196 – d. 1291 AD	
Amir Khusrau		b. 1253 – d. 1325 AD	the Nizamuddin Dargah
Attar of Nishapur		b. 1145 – d. 1221 AD	the Mausoleum of Attar of Nishapur
Baba Fakruddin		b. 1169 – d. 1295 AD	Penukonda
Bahauddin Zakariya	Suhrawardiyya	b. 1170 – d. 1267 AD	Multan
Bodla Bahar		b. 1238 – d. 1298 AD	Sehwan Sharif
Bu Ali Shah Qalandar		b. 1209 – d. 1324 AD	Panipat
Iraqī		b. 1213 – d. 1289 AD	
Haji Bektash Veli	Bektashi	b. 1209 – d. 1271 AD	Haji Bektash Veli Complex
Ibrahim al-Dasuqi	Desouki	b. 1255 – d. 1296 AD	Desouk
Ibn Ata Allah	Shadhili	13th-century AD	
Iraqī		b. 1213 – d. 1289 AD	
Jalaluddin Surkh-Posh Bukhari		b. 1192 – d. 1291 AD	
Nizamuddin Auliya	Chishti	b. 1238 – d. 1325 AD	Delhi
Pir Baba		b. 1431 – d. 1502 AD	
Rukn-e-Alam		b. 1251 – d. 1335 AD	Multan
Shah Jalal		b. 1271 – d. 1347 AD	Sylhet
Sharfuddin Shah Wilayat		b. 1255 – d. 1346 AD	

=== 14th century (1300–1399 AD) ===
Name	Sufi Order	Born / Death year	Region
Abd al-Karīm al-Jīlī		b. 1365 – d. 1424 AD	
Adam Khaki		14th-century AD	Badarpur
Amir Kulal		b. 1278 – d. 1370 AD	
Baha' al-Din Naqshband	Naqshbandi	b. 1318 – d. 1389 AD	Bukhara
Bande Nawaz	Chishti	b. 1321 – d. 1422 AD	Gulbarga
Hafez		b. 1315 – d. 1390 AD	Tomb of Hafez
Haji Bayram Veli	Bayramiye	b. 1352 – d. 1430 AD	Ankara
Imam Fassi		14th-century AD	
Imam Fassi	Shadhili	14th-century AD	
Ismail Qureshi al Hashmi		b. 1260 – d. 1349 AD	
Jahaniyan Jahangasht		b. 1308 – d. 1384 AD	
Kasim Baba	Bektashi	15th-century AD	
Makhdoom Ali Mahimi		b. 1372 – d. 1431 AD	
Mir Sayyid Ali Hamadani	Kubrawiya	b. 1314 – d. 1384 AD	Khatlon Region
Nund Rishi		b. 1377 – d. 1438 AD	
Pir Baba		b. 1431 – d. 1502 AD	
Shah Jalal		b. 1271 – d. 1347 AD	Sylhet
Shah Paran		14th-century AD	Chittagong
Shaykh Syed Mir Mirak Andrabi		10th-century AH	

=== 15th century (1400–1499 AD) ===
Name	Sufi Order	Born / Death year	Region
Abu Bakr al-Aydarus	Qadiriyya	b. 1447 – d. 1508 AD	Aden
Akshamsaddin		b. 1389 – d. 1459 AD	Göynük
Ali-Shir Nava'i		b. 1441 – d. 1501 AD	Herat
Amir Kulal		b. 1278 – d. 1370 AD	
Baha' al-Din Naqshband	Naqshbandi	b. 1318 – d. 1389 AD	Bukhara
Gül Baba		d. 1541 AD	Tomb of Gül Baba
Jahanara Begum Sahib		b. 1614 – d. 1681 AD	
Khan Jahan Ali		d. 1459 AD	
Makhdoom Yahya Maneri		b. 1263 – d. 1381 AD	
Makhdoom Ali Mahimi		b. 1372 – d. 1431 AD	
Mohammed al-Hadi ben Issa	Aissawa	b. 1467 – d. 1526 AD	Meknes
Pir Baba		b. 1431 – d. 1502 AD	
Salim Chishti	Chishti	b. 1478 – d. 1572 AD	

=== 16th century (1500–1599 AD) ===
Name	Sufi Order	Born / Death year	Region
Balım Sultan	Bektashi	d. 1519 AD	Nevşehir Province
Bulleh Shah		b. 1680 – d. 1757 AD	Kasur
Daud Bandagi Kirmani		b. 1513 – d. 1575 AD	Shergarh, Punjab
Fuzuli		b. 1494 – d. 1556 AD	
Jahanara Begum Sahib		b. 1614 – d. 1681 AD	
Khwaja Ahrar	Naqshbandi	b. 1404 – d. 1490 AD	
Makhdoom Ali Mahimi		b. 1372 – d. 1431 AD	
Maulana Shahbaz Muhammad	Shattari / Qadiriyya	b. 1549 - d. 1640 AD	Bhagalpur, Bihar
Mian Mir		b. 1550 – d. 1635 AD	
Muhammad Qadiri	Qadiriyya	b. 1552 – d. 1654 AD	
Pir Baba		b. 1431 – d. 1502 AD	
Salim Chishti	Chishti	b. 1478 – d. 1572 AD	
Shah Hussain		b. 1538 – d. 1599 AD	
Shah Jalal Dakhini		d. 1476 AD	
Shahab al-Din Abu Hafs Umar Suhrawardi	Suhrawardiyya	13th-century AD	
Shahab al-Din Yahya ibn Habash Suhrawardi		12th-century AD	
Sultan Bahu		b. 1628 – d. 1691 AD	

=== 17th century (1600–1699 AD) ===
Name	Sufi Order	Born / Death year	Region
Afaq Khoja		b. 1626 – d. 1694 AD	Xinjiang
Azan Faqir		17th-century AD	Sivasagar near the Brahmaputra River
Baba Shadi Shaheed		17th-century AD	
Bibi Jamal Khatun		d. 1647 AD	Sehwan Sharif
Dara Shikoh		b. 1615 – d. 1659 AD	
Hamzah Fansuri		d. 1590 AD	Ujong Pacu, Aceh
Jahanara Begum Sahib		b. 1614 – d. 1681 AD	
Khwaja Baqi Billah	Naqshbandi	b. 1564 – d. 1605 AD	Delhi
Mian Mir		b. 1550 – d. 1635 AD	
Muhammad Qadiri	Qadiriyya	b. 1552 – d. 1654 AD	
Rahman Baba		17th-century AD	
Sarmad Kashani		d. 1661 AD	
Shah Badakhshi		b. 1584 – d. 1661 AD	
Shah Abdul Latif Bhittai		b. 1689 – d. 1752 AD	
Sultan Bahu		b. 1628 – d. 1691 AD	

=== 18th century (1700–1799 AD) ===
Name	Sufi Order	Born / Death year	Region
Abdallah ibn Alawi al-Haddad		b. 1634 – d. 1720 AD	Hadhramaut
Ahmad al-Tijani	Tijaniyyah	b. 1737 – d. 1815 AD	Fez, Morocco
Usman dan Fodio	Qadiriyya	b. 1754 – d. 1817 AD	Sokoto, Nigeria
Ahmadou Bamba		b. 1853 – d. 1927 AD	Touba
Ghulam Ali Dehlavi		b. 1743 – d. 1824 AD	Delhi
Habib Noh		b. 1788 – d. 1866 AD	Keramat Habib Noh
İbrahim Hakkı Erzurumi		b. 1703 – d. 1780 AD	Tillo
Mirza Mazhar Jan-e-Janaan		b. 1699 – d. 1781 AD	
Noor Muhammad Maharvi		b. 1730 – d. 1791 AD	
Shah Abdul Latif Bhittai		b. 1689 – d. 1752 AD	

=== 19th century (1800–1899 AD) ===
Name	Sufi Order	Born / Death year	Region
Muhammad Qasim Sadiq	Naqshbandi	b. 1845 - d. 1943 AD	Mohra Sharif Rawalpindi, Pakistan
Mohammad Abu Bakr Siddique		b. 1845 – d. 1939 AD	Furfura Sharif
Ahmed Raza Khan Barelvi		b. 1856 – d. 1921 AD	Bareilly Sharif Dargah
Ahmad Sirhindi	Naqshbandi	b. 1564 – d. 1624 AD	Sirhind
Ata Hussain Fani Chishti	Chishti	b. 1816 – d. 1893 AD	Gaya (India)
Fazl Ahmad Khan		b. 1857 – d. 1907 AD	India
Ghousi Shah		b. 1893 – d. 1954 AD	Hyderabad
Ghulam Farid		b. 1845 – d. 1901 AD	Mithankot
(Hafez Al-Hajji) Rahim Bukhsh		b. ~1870s - d. ~1930	Reasi, Jammu in India then Jhelum, Punjab in Pakistan
Nazim Al-Haqqani	Naqshbandi	20th-century AD	
Sachal Sarmast		b. 1739 – d. 1827 AD	
Syed Ahmad Ullah Maizbhandari		b. 1826 – d. 1906 AD	Maizbander Dorbar Shoriph,Fotikchadhi, Chottogram

=== 20th century (1900–1999 AD) ===
Name	Sufi Order	Born / Death year	Region
Ameer Muhammad Akram Awan	Naqshbandi	b. 1934 – d. 2017 AD	
Akhundzada Saif-ur-Rahman Mubarak	Saifia	b. 1925 – d. 2010 AD	Lahore
Syed Abul Fazal Sultan Ahmad Chandrapuri	Naqshbandi-Mujaddidi, Sultania-Mujaddidi	b. 1909 – d. 1984 AD	Bangladesh
Khwaja Yunus Ali	Naqshbandi-Mujaddidi	b. 1886 – d. 1952 AD	East Bengal
Ibrahim Niass	Tijaniyyah	b. 1900 - d. 1975 AD	Kaolack, Senegal
Ahamed Muhyudheen Noorishah Jeelani		b. 1915 – d. 1990 AD	Hyderabad, India
Bawa Muhaiyaddeen		d. 1986 AD	Philadelphia
Ghousi Shah		b. 1893 – d. 1954 AD	Hyderabad
Hazrat Babajan		d. 1931 AD	Pune
Muhammad Ilyas Attar Qadri	Qadiriyya	20th-century AD	
Muhammad Alauddin Siddiqui		b. 1936 – d. 2017 AD	
Muhammad Tegh Ali	Qadiriyya	d. 1958	Muzaffarpur
Raquib Shah		b. 1901 – d. 1967 AD	Sylhet, Bangladesh
Sufi Barkat Ali		20th-century AD	
Wasif Ali Wasif		b. 1929 – d. 1993 AD	Lahore
Shareef ud-Din Maqbool i Ilahi		b. 1919 – d. 1969 AD	

| Dr. Muhammad Ishaque Sabri Chisti Qadri Rifai Bayabani || || b. 1917 – d. 1992 AD || Akola Maharastra |}

=== 21st century (2000–2099 AD) ===
Name	Sufi Order	Born / Death year	Region
Muhammad Alauddin Siddiqui		b. 1936 – d. 2017 AD	
Ameer Muhammad Akram Awan	Naqshbandi	b. 1934 – d. 2017 AD	
Akhundzada Saif-ur-Rahman Mubarak	Saifia	b. 1925 – d. 2010 AD	Lahore
Hazart Syed Mir Tayyab Ali Shah Bukhari	Naqashbandi	b. 1967 – d. 2022 AD	Okara
Hazrat Atif shah taji Yousufi	Yousufi	Karachi	
Peer Shoukat Ali Awan	Gullshahi	b.1937 - d. 2006 AD	Lahore

== List ==
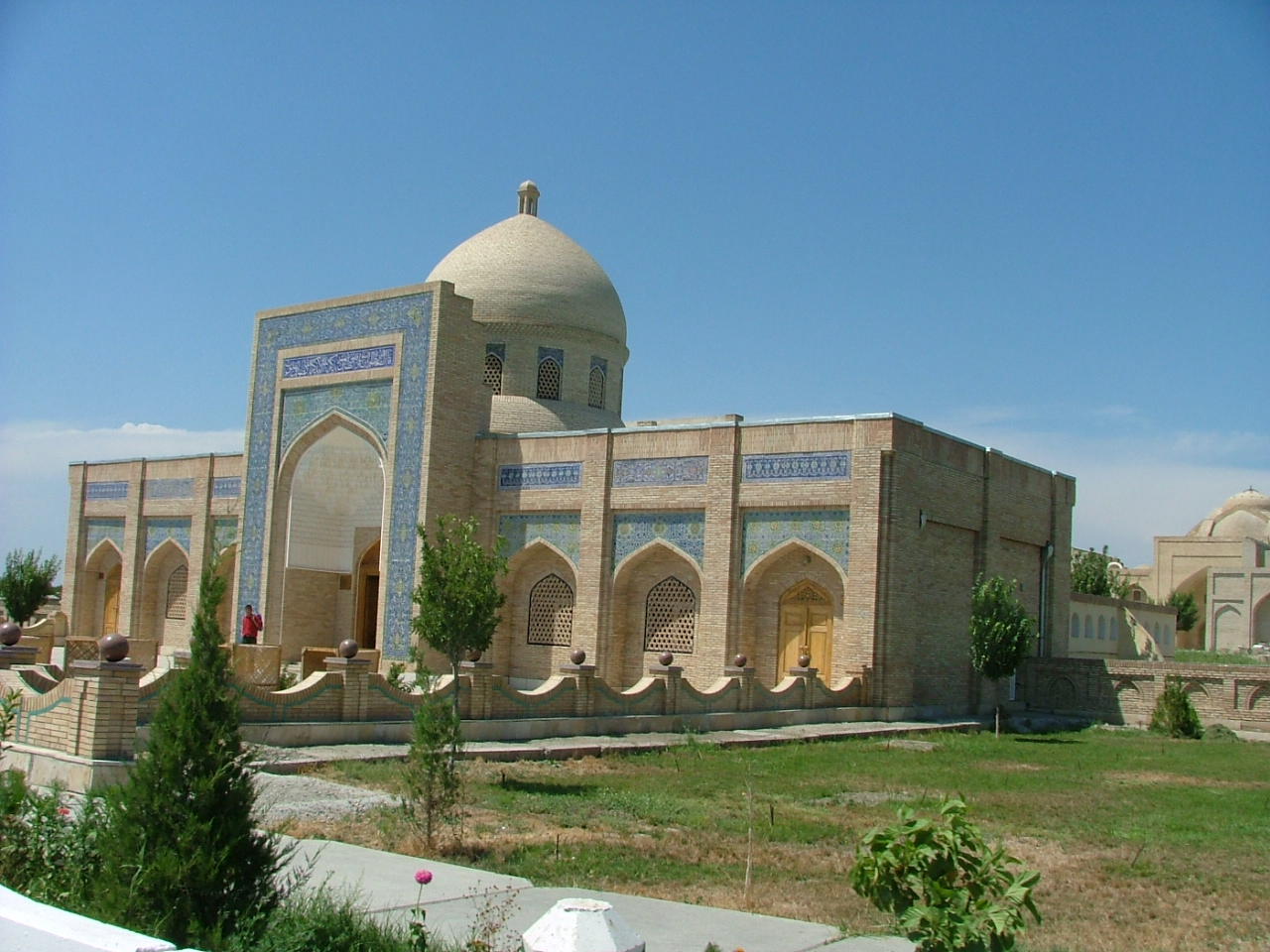
Mosque and shrine of Sayyid Baha ud-Din Naqshband Bukhari in Bukhara, Uzbekistan. After whom the Naqshbandi Golden Chain is named after.

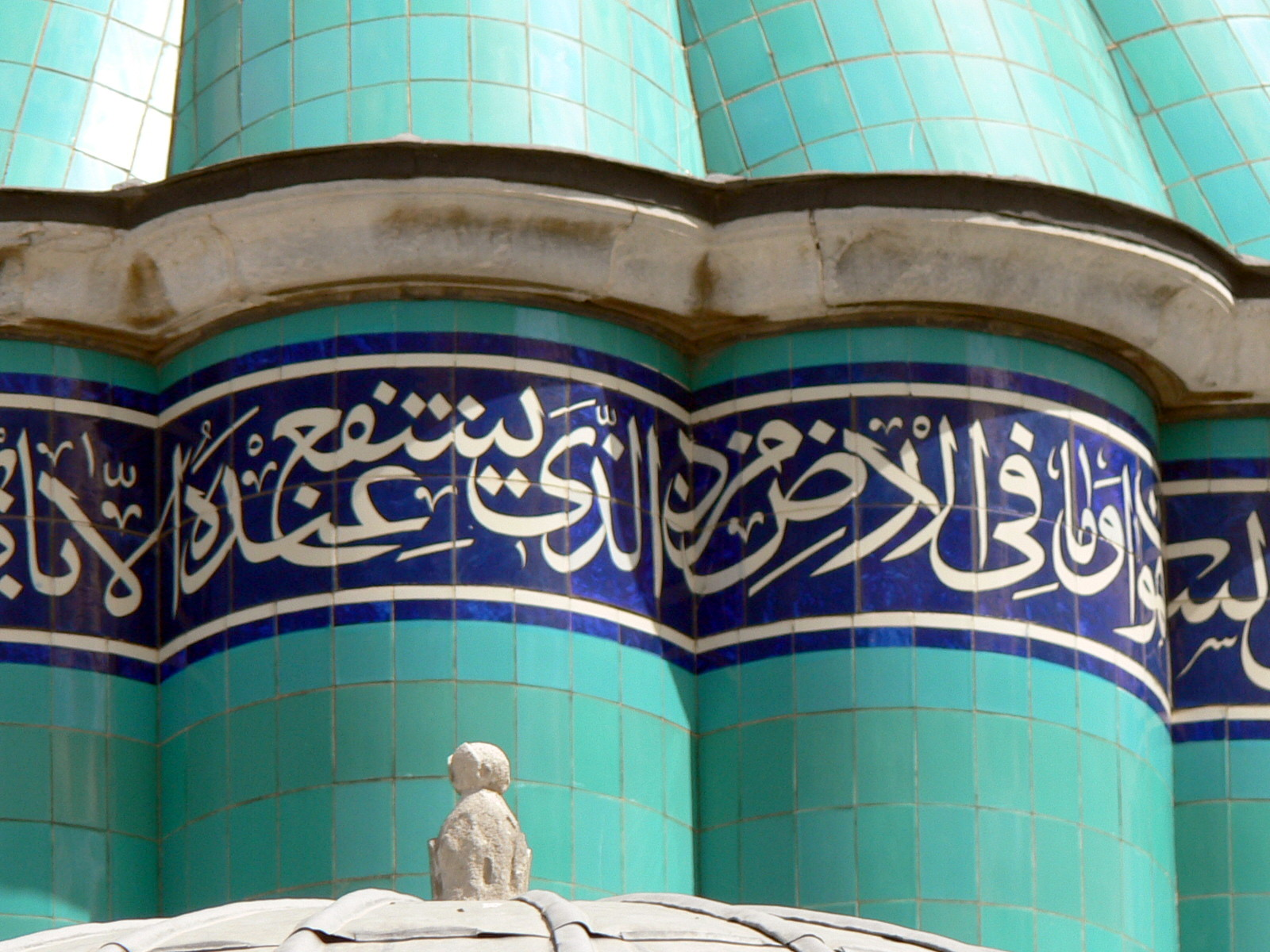
Quranic calligraphy inscribed on the walls of the famous 12th century Islamic saint, scholar, jurist and theologian Jalal ad-Din Rumi in Konya, Turkey.

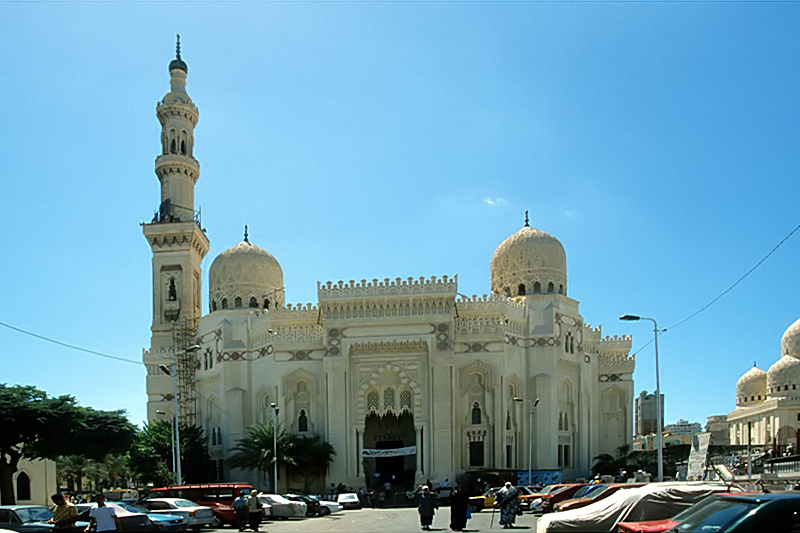
Mosque and shrine of Imam Al-Mursi Abu'l-'Abbas, in ميدان المساجد، الجمرك، Qesm Al Gomrok, Alexandria Governorate, Egypt.

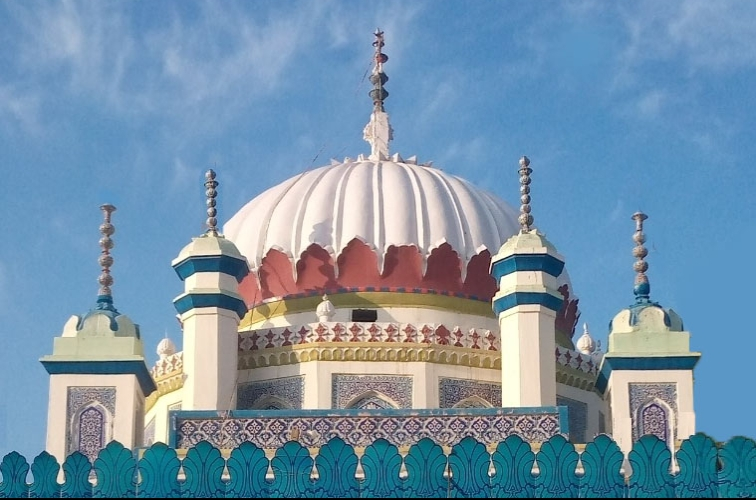
Shrine of Pir Hadi Hassan Bux Shah Jilani in Sindh, Pakistan

=== A ===
- Sheikh Hafiz Amin bin Abdurehman Qutab Al Iqtab Idreesia al badriya Muhammadiya
- Abul Hasan ash-Shadhili
- Ali Hisam-ad-Din Naqshbandi
- Ameer Muhammad Akram Awan (1934–2017, 12th Sheikh of Silsila Naqshbandia Owaisiah and writer of several books and 03 Tafaseer of the Holy Qur'an)
- Abdallah ibn Alawi al-Haddad (1634–1720, buried in Hadhramaut, author on several books on Dhikr)
- Abdullah Ansari
- Abdullah Shah Ghazi (d. 720, buried in Karachi)
- Abdul Khaliq Ghajadwani (d. 1179, buried in Bukhara, one of the Khwajagan of the Naqshbandi order)
- Abdul Qadir Gilani (1077–1166, buried in Baghdad, founder of the Qadiriyya Sufi order)
- Abdul Razzaq Gilani (1134–1207, buried in Baghdad, son of Abdul Qadir Gilani, promoted the Qadiriyya order)
- Abu Ishaq Shami (d. 940, buried on Mount Qasioun, founder of the Chishti Order)
- Abū-Sa'īd Abul-Khayr (967–1049, buried in Miana, Turkmenistan, poet who innovated the use of love poetry to express mystic concepts)
- Abu al-Abbas al-Mursi (1219–1287, buried in Anfoushi, one of the four master saints of Egypt)
- Abul Hasan Hankari (1018–1093, buried in Baghdad, noted scholar and miracle worker)
- Adam Khaki (14th century, buried in Badarpur, Assam, took part in the Conquest of Sylhet and preached at Badarpur)
- Afaq Khoja (1626–1694, buried in Xinjiang, opposed the Chagatai Khanate's attempt to enforce Yassa law on Muslims)
- Ahmad Main Sarkar Qadri Chishti Rehamani Shakoori Abdul Ulai Jahangiri Rehmanpur Sharif Rahimyar Khan
- Ahamed Muhyudheen Noorishah Jeelani (1915–1990, buried in Hyderabad, India, founder of the Nooriya Sufi order)
- Ahmed Raza Khan Barelvi (1856–1921, buried in the Bareilly Sharif Dargah, reformer in British India)
- Ahmad Ghazali (1061 to 1123 or 1126, buried in Qazvin, younger brother of the more famous Al-Ghazali, reasoned that as God is absolute beauty, to adore any object of beauty is to participate in a divine act of love)
- Ahmad al-Tijani (1737–1815, buried in Fez, Morocco), founder of the Tijaniyyah order)
- Ahmadou Bamba (1853–1927, buried next to the Great Mosque of Touba, lead a pacifist struggle against the French colonial empire)
- Ahmad Yasawi (1093–1166, buried in the Mausoleum of Khoja Ahmed Yasawi, poet, founder of Turkish Sufism)
- Akshamsaddin (1389–1459, buried in Göynük, tutor and advisor to Mehmed the Conqueror)
- Akhundzada Saif-ur-Rahman Mubarak (1925–2010, buried in Lahore, founder of the Saifia Sufi order)
- Al-Busiri (1211–1294, buried in Alexandria, poet, author of the Qasida Burda)
- Wasif Ali Wasif (1929–1993, buried in Lahore, was a teacher, writer, poet, and Sufi saint from Pakistan)
- Habib al-Ajami (d. 738, buried in Basra)
- Abu Bakr al-Aydarus (1447–1508, buried in Aden, the patron saint of Aden, credited with introducing Qadiri Sufism to Ethiopia and coffee to the Arab world)
- Ahmad al-Badawi (1200–1276, buried in Ahmad Al-Badawi Mosque, most popular saint in Egypt)
- Khwaja Ahrar (1404–1490 AD), played a significant role in establishing the Naqshbandi Order
- Al-Ghazali (1058–1111, buried in Tus, Iran, considered a Mujaddid, author of The Revival of the Religious Sciences and The Incoherence of the Philosophers, influenced early modern European criticism of Aristotelian physics)
- Al-Hallaj (858–922, ashes scattered in the Tigris, imprisoned and executed after requesting "O Muslims, save me from God" and declaring "I am the Truth")
- Ali Hujwiri (1009–1072/77, buried in Lahore, Pakistan, author of Kashf ul Mahjoob, spread Sufism throughout the Indian Subcontinent)
- Ali-Shir Nava'i (1441–1501, buried in Herat, author of Muhakamat al-Lughatayn and founder of Turkic literature)
- Abu al-Hassan al-Kharaqani (963–1033, illiterate mystic who influenced Avicenna, Rumi, and Jami)
- Al-Qushayri (986–1072, buried in Nishapur, author who distinguished four layers of Quranic interpretation and defended the historical lineage of Sufism)
- Alauddin Sabir Kaliyari (1196–1291, buried near Haridwar, founder of the Sabiriya branch of the Chishti order)
- Amir Khusrau (1253–1325, buried in the Nizamuddin Dargah, influential musician, considered the "father of Urdu literature")
- Amir Kulal (1278–1370, buried near Bukhara, taught Timur and Baha' al-Din Naqshband)
- Attar of Nishapur (1145–1221, buried in the Mausoleum of Attar of Nishapur, author of The Conference of the Birds and the hagiographic Tazkirat al-Awliya)
- Aurangzeb (1618–1707), buried in Khuldabad, also known as Jinda Pir. Author of Fatwa e Alamgir.
- Azan Faqir (17th century, buried in Sivasagar near the Brahmaputra River, reformer who stabilized Islam in the Assam region)
- Abd al-Karīm al-Jīlī (1365–1424, expounded on the works of Ibn Arabi)
- Abu Al Fazal Abdul Wahid Yemeni Tamimi
- Abdul Aziz bin Hars bin Asad Yemeni Tamimi
- Abu al-Najib Suhrawardi
- Abu Bakr Shibli
- Ahmad Zarruq
- Arabati Baba Teḱe
- Ata Hussain Fani Chishti (1816–1893, buried in Gaya (India)) was a Sufi saint of the Chishti Order in South Asia.

=== B ===
- Baba Fakruddin (1169–1295, buried in Penukonda)
- Baba Kuhi of Shiraz (948–1037)
- Baba Shadi Shaheed (17th century, first Chib Rajput to convert to Islam, married a daughter of Babur)
- Sheikh Bedreddin (1359–1420, buried in Istanbul in 1961, revolted against Mehmed I)
- Baha' al-Din Naqshband (1318–1389, buried in Bukhara, founder of the Naqshbandi order)
- Balım Sultan (d. 1517/1519, buried in Nevşehir Province, co-founder of the Bektashi Order)
- Bahauddin Zakariya (1170–1267, buried in the Shrine of Bahauddin Zakariya, spread the Suhrawardiyya order through South Asia)
- Bande Nawaz (1321–1422, buried in Gulbarga, spread the Chishti Order to southern India)
- Khwaja Baqi Billah (1564–1605, buried in Delhi, spread the Naqshbandi order into India)
- Bawa Muhaiyaddeen (d. 1986, founder of the Bawa Muhaiyaddeen Fellowship in Philadelphia)
- Bayazid Bastami (874/5-848/9, buried in Shrine of Bayazid Bostami, noted for his ideas on spiritual intoxication)
- Bibi Jamal Khatun (d. 1639 or 1647, lived in Sehwan Sharif, sister of Mian Mir)
- Bodla Bahar (1238–1298, buried in Sehwan Sharif, features in the miracle stories of Lal Shahbaz Qalandar)
- Bu Ali Shah Qalandar (1209–1324, buried in Panipat)
- Bulleh Shah (1680–1757, buried in Kasur, regarded as "the father of Punjabi enlightenment")

=== D ===
- Dara Shikoh (1615–1659, brother of Aurangzeb, author of Majma-ul-Bahrain)
- Daud Bandagi Kirmani (1513–1575, buried in Shergarh, Punjab)
- Dawūd al-Qayṣarī
- Dawud Tai (d. circa 777-782)
- Dhul-Nun al-Misri

=== F ===
- Fakhr ad-Din ar-Razi
- Fariduddin Ganjshakar (1188–1280, buried in the Shrine of Baba Farid, Pakpattan, Pakistan and developed Punjabi literature through poetry)
- Fazl Ahmad Khan (1857–1907), Indian Sufi teacher
- Fuzuli (1494–1556), considered one of the greatest poets of Azerbaijani literature)
- Imam Fassi

=== G ===
- Ghulam Ali Dehlavi (1743–1824, buried in Delhi)
- Ghulam Farid (1845–1901), buried in Mithankot, poet
- Ghousi Shah (1893–1954, buried in Hyderabad)
- Gül Baba (d. 1541, buried in Tomb of Gül Baba, esoteric author and patron saint of

=== H ===
- Habib Noh (1788–1866, buried in Keramat Habib Noh)
- Hafez (1315–1390, buried in Tomb of Hafez, highly popular antinomian Persian poet whose works are regularly quoted and even used for divination)
- Haji Huud (1025–1141, buried in Patan, Gujarat, helped spread Islam in India)
- Haji Bayram Veli (1352–1430, buried in Ankara, founder of the Bayramiye order)
- Haji Bektash Veli (1209–1271, buried in the Haji Bektash Veli Complex, revered by both Alevis and Bektashis)
- Hamzah Fansuri (d. c. 1590, buried in Ujong Pacu, Aceh)
- Hasan al-Basri (642–728, buried in Az Zubayr, highly important figure in the development of Sunni Sufism)
- Hazrat Babajan (d. 1931, buried in Pune, master to Meher Baba)
- Hayreddin Tokadi
- Yusuf Hamdani (1062–1141, buried in Merv)
- Mir Sayyid Ali Hamadani (1314–1384, buried in Khatlon Region, spread the Kubrawiya order throughout Asia)
- Usman Harooni
- Ali Hujwiri
- Hazarat Baba Gulam Jilani (R.A)

=== I ===
- Iraqī (1213–1289)
- Ibrahim Niass
- Ibrahim ibn Adham
- Ibn Arabi
- Ibn Ata Allah
- Imam Ali-ul-Haq (925–971, buried in Sialkot).
- Ibrahim al-Dasuqi (1255–1296, buried in Desouk, founder of the Desouki order)
- İbrahim Hakkı Erzurumi (1703–1780, buried in Tillo, astronomer and encyclopedist, first Muslim author to cover post-Copernican astronomy)
- Ibrahim ibn Faïd (1396–1453)
- Imadaddin Nasimi
- Ismail Haqqi Bursevi (1653–1725, buried in Bursa, author noted for esoteric interpretations of the Quran)
- Ismail Qureshi al Hashmi (1260–1349)

=== J ===
- Jalaluddin Surkh-Posh Bukhari (1192–1291)
- Jamal-ud-Din Hansvi
- Jabir ibn Hayyan
- Ja'far al-Sadiq
- Jahanara Begum Sahib (1614–1681)
- Jahaniyan Jahangasht (1308–1384)
- Jamī

=== K ===
- Kasim Baba, fifteenth century Bektashi holy man and missionary
- Khalid-i Baghdadi (1779–1827)
- Khalil Ur Rehman (Sohnay Main Sarkar) Qadri Chishti Rehamani Shakoori Abdul Ulai Jahangiri

Rehmanpur Sharif Rahimyar Khan

- Kabir (1398–1518)

=== M ===
- Muhibbullah Allahabadi
- Aisha Al-Manoubya
- Madurai Maqbara
- Merkez Efendi
- Mirza Mazhar Jan-e-Janaan (1699–1781)
- Muhammad Jaunpuri
- Muhammad al-Jazuli
- Syed Abdul Rehman Jilani Dehlvi (1024-1088)
- Abdul Karim Jili
- Junayd of Baghdad
- Khâlid-i Baghdâdî
- Qutbuddin Bakhtiar Kaki
- Alauddin Sabir Kaliyari
- Maruf Karkhi
- Khan Jahan Ali (d. 1459)
- Lal Shahbaz Qalander (1177–1274)
- Maulana Shahbaz Muhammad (1549–1640)
- Machiliwale Shah
- Magtymguly Pyragy
- Noor Muhammad Maharvi (1730–1791)
- Mahmoodullah Shah
- Mahmud Hudayi
- Madurai Maqbara
- Mir Amjad Ibrahim Ash Shadhili
- Meher Ali Shah
- Mian Mir (1550–1635)
- Mian Muhammad Bakhsh
- Sayyid Ali Hamadani
- Muhammad Suleman Taunsvi
- Mohammad Tartusi
- Abu Saeed Mubarak Makhzoomi (1013-1119)
- Muhammad Al-Makki
- Muhammad ibn Tayfour Sajawandi
- Muhammad Ilyas Attar Qadri
- Muqaddam
- Muhammad Qadiri (1552-1654)
- Mustafa Devati
- Mustafa Gaibi
- Mushtaq Ali Shah (?-1792)
- Makhdoom Ali Mahimi (1372–1431)
- Mohammed al-Hadi ben Issa (1467–1526, buried in Meknes, founder of the Aissawa order)
- Moinuddin Chishti (1141–1230, buried in the Ajmer Sharif Dargah, spread the Chishti order throughout India)
- Muhammad ibn `Ali at-Tirmidhi

=== N ===
- Nadir Ali Shah
- Fazlallah Astarabadi
- Najm al-Din Razi
- Najmuddin Kubra
- Nazim Al-Haqqani
- Nasir Khusraw
- Nasreddin
- Nathar Vali
- Shah Niamatullah
- Shah Nimatullah Wali
- Nizamuddin Auliya
- Nasiruddin Chiragh Dehlavi
- Nizamuddin Auliya (1238–1325)
- Nund Rishi (1377–1438)

=== O ===
- Omar Khayyam
- Osman Fazli
- Otman Baba
- Owais al-Qarani

=== P ===
- Pir Baba (1431–1502)
- Pir Sultan
- Pir Yemeni
- Muhammad Alauddin Siddiqui (1936–2017)

=== Q ===
- Qasim ibn Muhammad ibn Abi Bakr
- Qutb ad-Dīn Haydar
- Qutb al-Din al-Shirazi
- Qutbuddin Bakhtiar Kaki(1173–1235)

=== R ===
- Ahmad Sirhindi (a.k.a. Imam Rabbani; ca. 1564–1624)
- Rabia Basri
- Rahman Baba
- Ahmed al-Rifa'i
- Rukn-e-Alam (1251–1335)
- Rumi
- Raquib Shah (1901-1967) Sylhet city, Bangladesh.

=== S ===
- Saadi Shirazi
- Farqad Sabakhi
- Sachal Sarmast (1739-1827)
- Hazrat Syed Rakhyal Shah Sufi Al Qadri (Balochistan) (1262-1359)
- Shaban Veli
- Shah Maroof Khushabi
- Sidi Boushaki
- Sahl al-Tustari
- Salim Chishti (1478–1572)
- Salman the Persian
- Sanai
- Syed Ahmad Sultan (12th-century)
- Sarı Saltık
- Sarmad Kashani (d. 1661)
- Saint Nuri
- Ashraf Jahangir Semnani (1308–1405)
- Shah Abdul Latif Bhittai (1689-1752)
- Shah Badakhshi (1584–1661)
- Sayed Badiuddin
- Shah Gardez (1026–1152)
- Shah Hussain (1538–1599)
- Shah Jalal (1271–1347)
- Shah Jalal Dakhini (d. 1476)
- Shah Amanat (d. 1809)
- Shah Paran (14th century)
- Shams al-Hassan
- Shamas Faqir
- Shams Tabrizi
- Shamsuddin Ahmed, Lastimanika Meghna Comilla, Bangladesh (d 1880-1956)
- Molla Şemseddin Fenari
- Sheikh Edebali
- Şeyh Gâlib
- Shah Syed Muhammad Nurbakhsh Qahistani
- Syed Ahmad Ullah Maizbhandari (1826-1906)
- Soch Kraal
- Sufi Barkat Ali
- Shahab al-Din Abu Hafs Umar Suhrawardi
- Shahab al-Din Yahya ibn Habash Suhrawardi
- Shareef ud-Din Maqbool i Ilahi (1919-1969)
- Sharfuddin Shah Wilayat (1255-1346)
- Shaykh Syed Mir Mirak Andrabi ( 921A.H - 990 A.H)
- Somuncu Baba
- Sirri Saqti
- Sultan Bahu (1628–1691)
- Sultan Walad
- Shah Farid-ud-Din Baghdadi (c. 1551 AD – c. 1733 AD)
- Sadr al-Din al-Qunawi
- Safi-ad-din Ardabili
- Sünbül Efendi

=== T ===
- Tajuddin Muhammad Badruddin
- Telli Baba
- Taj Wali sarkar
- Tahir ul Qadri
- Hazrath Kwajha Sha Tippu Mastan Auliya - Arcot
- Hazrath Office Syed Karimullah Sha Qadiri - Arcot
- Hazrath Office Syed Rahemullah Sha Qadiri - Arcot

=== U ===
- Üftade
- Usman dan Fodio the Founder of the Sokoto Caliphate and the leader of West African Jihad in 1804
- Uthman Sirâj-ud-Dîn Naqshbandi

=== W ===
- Waris Shah
- Waris Ali Shah
- Sayed Wasi-ud-Din

=== Y ===
- Yahya bey Dukagjini
- Yahya Efendi
- Makhdoom Yahya Maneri (1263–1381)
- Khwaja Yunus Ali
- Yunus Emre

=== Z ===
- Zahed Gilani

== See also ==
- Sufism
- Islam in India
- List of Sufis
- Sufism in India
