= Hadayat us Salikeen =

Pakistani

- Author: Akhundzada Saif-ur-Rahman Mubarak
- Language: Urdu,
- Genre: Islam
- Publisher: Jamia Jelania Nadar Abad Lahore Cantt
- Publication place: Pakistan
- Pages: 532 pages

Hidāyat al-Sālikīn (Arabic: ھداية السّالکين في ردّ المنکرين) is a Sufi religious text composed mainly of treatises by the Pakistani Sunni scholar and founder of Saifia Tariqa Saif-ur-Rahman Mubarak on the merits of good deeds and an apologetic response to the critics.
