= Badarpur Railway Town =

- town
- Location in Assam, India Badarpur Railway Town (India)
- Coordinates: 24°51′44″N 92°33′34″E
- Country: India
- State: Assam
- District: Cachar

Population (2001)
  - Total: 9,940

Languages
  - Official: Bengali and Meitei (Manipuri)
- Time zone: UTC+5:30 (IST)
- Vehicle registration: AS

Badarpur Railway Town is a census town in Cachar district in the state of Assam, India. Together with adjacent Badarpur Town, it forms the Badarpur Urban Area, one of two notified urban areas in the district.

== Demographics ==
Bengali and Meitei (Manipuri) are the official languages of this place.

As of 2001 India census, Badarpur Railway Town had a population of 9940. Males constitute 51% of the population and females 49%. Badarpur Town has an average literacy rate of 84%, higher than the national average of 59.5%; with 53% of the males and 47% of females literate. 8% of the population is under 6 years of age. Majority of the population of Badarpur Railway Town is from East Bengal (Bangladesh) who migrated during and after the partition.
