= Akhundzada Saif-ur-Rahman Mubarak =

20th and 21st-century founder of Silsila saifia

Akhundzada Saif ur Rahman Mubarak
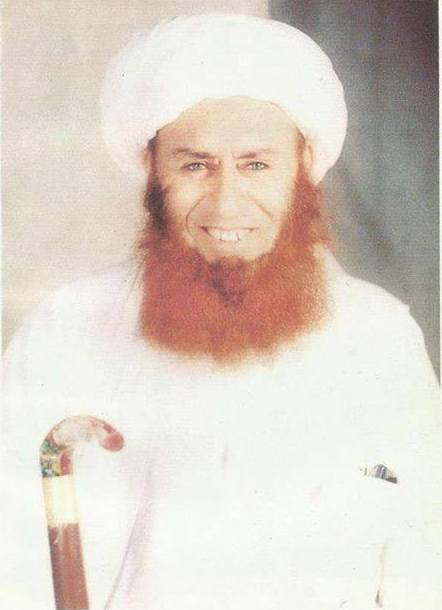

Personal life
- Born: Muharram 20, 1344 AH, August 10, 1925 CE
- Died: Rajab 14, 1431 AH, June 27, 2010 CE
- Era: Modern era
- Region: Afghanistan, Pakistan
- Other names: Peer-e-Archi; Hazrat Sahib; Kajurai Baba; Shah-e-Khurasan; Imam-e-Khurasani; Mubarak Sahab

Religious life
- Denomination: Sunni
- Sect: Saifia
- Jurisprudence: Hanafi
- Tariqa: Naqshbandi
- Creed: Maturidi

Senior posting
- Influenced by: Abu Hanifa, Baha-ud-Din Naqshband Bukhari, Abdul-Qadir Gilani, Moinuddin Chishti, Ahmad Sirhindi, Ahmed Raza Khan Barelvi, Hashim Samangani, Shah Rasul Thaqalayni
- Influenced: Hazrat Peer Saif Ur Rehman Mian Muhammad Hanfi Saifi & others one million Saifi Salikeen

Akhundzada Saif ur Rahman Mubarak (Arabic: آخوندزاده سيف الرحمان مبارك) also known as Mubarak Sahib (1925 – 2010) was a Sufi scholar of the Naqshbandi Tariqa, the founder of the Saifia sect. He adhered to the Hanafi school of thought (Madhhab), the Maturidi creed (Aqidah), and the Naqshbandi order (Tariqa).

He was known for the gatherings of zikr (Remembrance of Allah) he held. Through him many people converted to Islam. His followers observe strict compliance with Sunnah and practice zikr regularly.

== Early life ==
He was born in a small village named Baba Kalai, about 20 km (12 mi) from Jalalabad, Afghanistan, on Muharram 20, 1344 AH (August 10, 1925 CE). Mubarak was the son of Sufi leader Hafiz Muhammad Sarfraz Khan, a disciple of Sheikh Haji Muhammad Amin of the Qadiriyah Sufi order.

== Education ==
Mubarak's basic education from his father included Qur'an study. When he was 13 his mother died. For his formal religious education, he moved to Peshawar in the 1358 AH (early 1940), learning in-depth classic Islamic studies including Tafseer, Hadith, Usul al-fiqa, Aqida and Tajwid.

After completing his education he returned to Afghanistan, living in Kunduz. He was allotted land by the Afghan government in the Archi District. Now a religious scholar, he constructed a mosque and served as its imam (prayer leader) and khatib (leader delivering the Friday sermon). He also started offering free Dars-e-Nizami beginner and advanced level courses to students.

== Entry into Sufism ==
During his stay in Archi, Mubarak developed a special interest in Sufism and began privately studying it to develop a conceptual understanding. Here he met Naqshbandi sheikh and Sufi scholar Shah Rasul Taloqani; At the age of 32, he was instantly granted bay'ah (initiation into the order).

Sheikh Thaqalayni, being at an advanced age, instructed his Salikeeneen (disciples) to remain in the company of one of his murids (apprentices), Maulana Muhammad Hashim Samangani, after his death. Sheikh Thaqalayni passed away in 1381 AH (1961). Following his master's request, Mubarak received bay'ah from Samangani, who renewed the zikr and continued Mubarak's training in the order.

When Sheikh Samangani fell ill in 1387 AH (1967), he accepted Mubarak to share responsibilities of training other disciples, building on the limited Khilafat (successorship) status that Mubarak had already received. Mubarak took this opportunity to build a closer relationship with his murshid (spiritual master), while also elevating his status over the other disciples and indavertently positioning himself as a successor. Mubarak was said to have carried out his duties faithfully and responsibly to the extent that Sheikh Samangani granted him mutliq khilafat (complete successorship).

Mubarak served for roughly three years under Sheikh Samangani until the latter's death in 1391 AH (1971) after which was directed to Sheikh Haji Pachero for training in the Qadiriyah order. Soon he was bestowed with Khilafat of that order too. He then went to Nowshehra, Pakistan, where he spent some time and imparted coaching to the salikeen in the vicinity. After some time, he returned to Afghanistan and traveled in various parts of the country including Nangarhar, Jalalabad, and Laghman. On instructions by his Murshid, Mubarak returned to Archi, where he remained preoccupied with propagating Islam.

In 1398 AH (1978) Akhundzada Mubarak performed Hajj. He also visited Madinah and visited various regions on his journey back to Afghanistan.

== Emigration to Pakistan ==
Saif-ur-Rahman Mubarak opted to leave Afghanistan in 1978, prior to the Soviet–Afghan War, for the sake of his murshid who was buried in Pir Sabaq, a small town near Nowshehra, where for three years he provided religious guidance. In 1409–1410 AH (1988–1990), Afridi tribes of Bara offered him land for a meeting house. At this juncture, the Saifia order originated. He built a mosque, Dar-ul-Ulum, and khanqah (spiritual lodge) to serve as a place where he could continue training his disciples.

In Bara, his preaching was opposed by Munir Shakir, a Deobandi cleric, backed by activists of his armed group, Lashkar-e-Islam, who had earlier been expelled from the Kurram District by the Political Agency due to his active involvement in sectarian violence and who resorted to violence against Mubarak including initiation of propaganda from the Afghan Taliban's pirate radio broadcasters (popularly nicknamed the "FM Mullahs"), attacking and burning property.

== See also ==
- Hadayat us Salikeen
- Saifia
