= Mount Palmer, Singapore =

Former hill in Singapore

Mount Palmer
- Bukit Parsi (Malay for Parsi Hill)
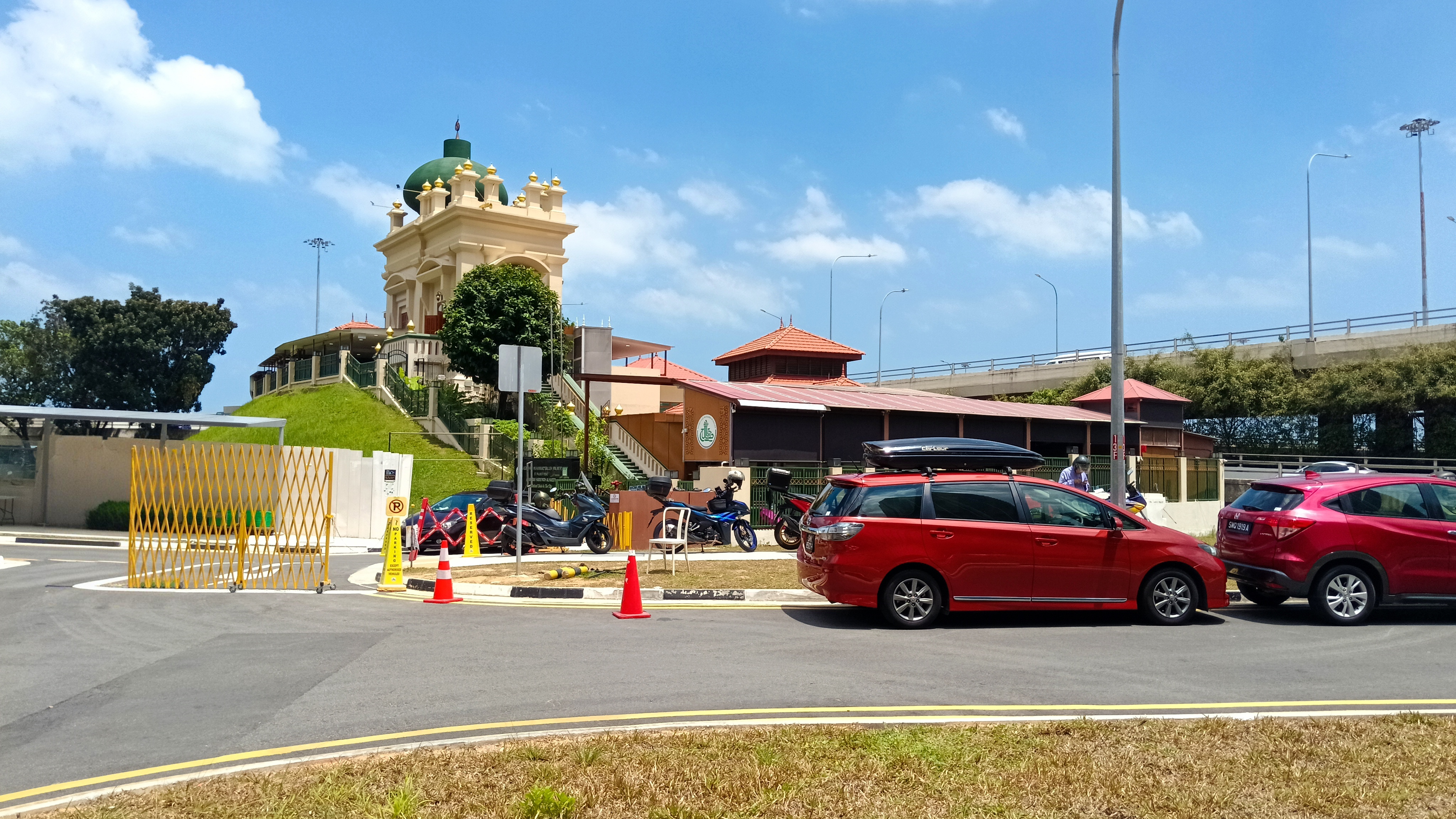
- Keramat Habib Noh, one of the last remnants of Mount Palmer.
- Interactive map of Mount Palmer
- Owner: Singapore Land Authority (SLA)
- Maintained by: SLA
- Nearest Mass Rapid Transit System station: Prince Edward Road MRT station

Other
- Known for: Being a prominent Parsi settlement in pre-war colonial Singapore, as well as containing two religious heritage sites (Keramat Habib Noh and the Fook Tet Soo Khek Temple)

Mount Palmer is a former hill in Tanjong Pagar, Singapore. Named after John Palmer, a merchant from Calcutta, the hill was home to a massive Parsi settlement. The hill was levelled in the early to mid-20th century, with the only sign of its existence remaining being the site of a mosque, a temple, and the nearby Palmer Road, which led to the hill.

== History ==
In the 1820s, a prominent British-Indian merchant from Calcutta named John Palmer built a bungalow at the top of the hill and later established his family business John Palmer & Company there, leading to the hill being named Mount Palmer. Extending his property, Palmer ordered that warehouses and godowns were built at the foothills of Mount Palmer. However, he suffered from financial losses in the mid-1820s, finally selling his properties off to an unknown Parsi entrepreneur in 1828. The bungalow was converted into a Parsi community centre while Parsi establishments and housing were developed on the hill, including religious amenities like a temple and cemetery. It was one of the largest Parsi settlements in the area and became familiar with Malays under the nickname "Bukit Parsi" (Malay for "Parsi Hill"). An 1884 survey map of the area takes note of the fact that there were already several cemeteries and lodging houses belonging to the Parsi community. A Chinese temple, Fook Tet Soo Khek Temple, was also established at the base of the hill in 1844 by Hakka immigrants.

In 1867, British entrepreneur Robert Hardie sold the land to fellow entrepreneurs Hoo Ah Kay, Parsick Joaquim and Cursedjeet Lalla as tenants-in-common, which meant that each tenant controlled his own part of the land that was divided and allocated to him. Cursedjeet Lalla sold his share of the land to the other two tenants in 1871. During this time, a small Muslim cemetery developed at the top of one of the foothills where the earlier surviving godowns from John Palmer's industry were located. The hill was also fortified in 1867 and the fortifications were ready by 1878 in preparation of a prospective war with Russia.

In 1903, a Batavian merchant built a mosque for the Muslim cemetery at the foothill. At the same time, the fortifications around Mount Palmer were demolished, while the hill itself was being gradually levelled for a land reclamation project in the area. The project was completed in 1932, which saw most of Mount Palmer being levelled completely and turned into landfill for the reclamation, except for the religious sites in the area. Japanese pilots bombed Mount Palmer in World War II, causing damage to the Chinese temple while the Muslim cemetery and mosque sustained minor damage and was used as a raid shelter. After the independence of Singapore, Mount Palmer fell under the ownership of the Singapore Land Authority. Throughout the late 1960s, parts of the remaining Parsi settlement were demolished, while the cemetery was exhumed and reinterred in a new plot of land allocated to the Parsi community in the Choa Chu Kang Cemetery.

The Muslim cemetery was exhumed in the 1980s, although the mosque was rebuilt along with a surviving mausoleum and reopened in 1987 as the Keramat Habib Noh religious complex. The temple was restored in the 1970s and was allowed to be preserved under a Temporary Occupation License (TOL) which would be renewed yearly. Both the temple and the mosque are now religious heritage sites along Palmer Road. The Shenton Way Bus Terminal was re-established along Palmer Road in 2010, although it was inaccessible to the public and commuters were required to board or alight at nearby bus stops.

In February 2016, the Prince Edward Road MRT station in the area was officially announced as one of three stations to complete the loop of the Circle Line. To make way for construction of the station, the remaining levels and foothills of Mount Palmer (that did not have any existing construction on it) were razed to the ground, along with remnants of the old Parsi Cemetery. Construction works would skirt around the Fook Tet Soo Khek Temple and Keramat Habib Noh while preserving Palmer Road itself.

== Archaeological discoveries ==
In 2006, the Fook Tet Soo Khek Temple sponsored an archaeological dig in the flat lands surrounding the temple as part of a campaign to preserve the temple. More than a thousand artefacts, mostly ceramics from the 19th and 20th centuries, were discovered. Military artefacts left behind by the Japanese and British from World War II were also found hidden in the soil. In a separate independent project, ruins of godowns from John Palmer's company were also discovered in the small hill that the Keramat Habib Noh stands on.

== Transportation ==
The site of the former Mount Palmer is served by Prince Edward Road MRT station on the Circle Line of the MRT and Shenton Way Bus Terminal for bus services.

== See also ==
- Tanjong Pagar
- Shenton Way
