= 2006 Mumbai sweet seawater incident =

Case of mass hysteria

The 2006 Mumbai "sweet" seawater incident witnessed hundreds of residents of Mumbai drinking the seawater at Mahim Creek, amid claims that the foul-smelling water had suddenly turned sweet by a miracle and could now cure illnesses. Authorities in Mumbai warned against drinking the polluted water because of health risks. Within hours, residents of Gujarat claimed that seawater at Tithal beach had turned sweet as well. This caused a mass hysteria among people who started coming in large numbers to drink the seawater.

== Reactions ==
In the aftermath of the incidents, local authorities feared the possibility of a severe outbreak of water-borne diseases, such as gastroenteritis. The Maharashtra Pollution Control Board had warned people not to drink the water, but despite this many people had collected it in bottles, even as plastic and rubbish had drifted by on the current. The Municipal Corporation of Greater Mumbai had ordered a bacteriological report into the "sweet" water, but suspected that "contamination in the water might have been reduced due to the waters from Mithi river flowing into the mouth of Mahim Bay".

== Possible explanations ==
Geologists at the Indian Institute of Technology Bombay offered the explanation that water turning sweet was a natural phenomenon. Continuous rainfall over the preceding few days had caused a large pool of fresh water to accrue in an underground rock formation near the coast, the pool then discharging into the sea as a large "plume" as fractures in the rocks widened. Because of the differences in density, the discharged fresh water floated on top of the salt water of the sea and spread along the coast. Over time, the two would mix to become normal sea water once more.

According to Valsad District Collector D Rawal, the reason for the water in Gujarat tasting less salty than usual was that because of the monsoon, two rivers (Auranga and Banki) were overflowing into the sea in the region.

A similar natural phenomenon is also observed in the case of halocline.

== Timeline of events ==
- 18 August 8 p.m.: Devotees headed to Mahim Creek amid rumors that the seawater is less salty than usual. Many attribute the phenomenon to divine intervention, particularly because the "miracle" is taking place at the shrine of Haji Maqdoom Baba.
- 19 August, Midnight: Thousands begin to bottle and drink the water despite desperate pleas by political leaders and health officials who stated that the water could be polluted by toxins.
- 19 August 1 a.m.: Police arrive as more devotees arrive to experience the "miracle".
- 19 August, 10:30 a.m.: The tide turns and people admit that the water is "less sweet".
- 19 August 2 p.m.: The phenomenon ends as people acknowledge that the water has turned salty again.
