= Ismail Qureshi al Hashmi =

Indian Sheikh

Shaikh Ismail Quraishi Asadi Hashmi Suharwardi
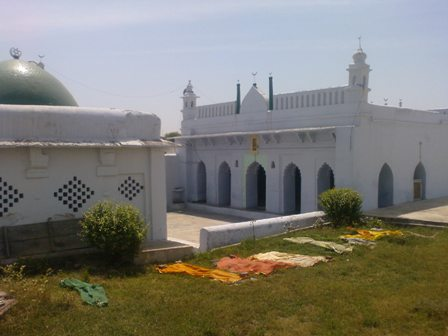
- Mosque & tomb of Shaikh Ismail
- Title: Makhdoom e Hind

Personal life
- Born: 1260 Multan
- Died: 1349 (aged 88–89) Bamhrauli, Allahabad
- Other name: Makhdoom Shah of Bamhrauli/Bamrauli

Religious life
- Religion: Islam
- Denomination: the Suhrawardiyya order of Sufism

Muslim leader
- Based in: Allahabad
- Period in office: Early 14th century
- Predecessor: Shah Rukn e Alam Multani
- Successor: Various, including Shah Karak, Anas saeed Hashmi and Dana Nathan

Imaduddin Ismail Qureshi Asadi al Hashmi, a Suharwardi Shaikh was one of the pioneers of Islamic preaching in the Allahabad district. He was the grandson of Bahauddin Zakaria Multani and the son of Sadruddin Arif Multani. He is commonly known as Makhdoom Shah Bamrauli.

== Birth and education ==
Ismail was born in 1259/1260 AD in Multan and was brought up under the guidance of his father Shaikh Sadruddin and grandfather Shaikh Bahauddin Zakaria.

He was initiated into Suharwardi order at the hands of his grandfather Bahauddin Zakaria and trained by his father and his elder brother Shaikh Ruknuddin Abul Fateh alias Shah Rukn e Alam of Multan. Shah Ruknuddin kept his brother always with him and even in his visits to Delhi at the call of Alauddin Khalji. When Shah Ruknuddin visited Shaikh Nizamuddin Auliya, his younger brother Shaikh Ismail was with him and asked some questions from both the holy men.

== From Multan to Allahabad ==
Shaikh Ismail used to mainly live in Multan looking after the propagation and educative activities of his Khanqaah but a divine intuition propelled him to migrate and shift to Allahabad, called Prayaq at the time, before the death of his brother.

At this distance he travelled first to Delhi where the emperor Alauddin Khalji and his successor welcomed him. From there he travelled to Allahabad via kara and settled in a village named Bamhrauli or Bamrauli (Chail, Allahabad). Thus he is considered to be one of the earliest Shaikhs who settled in the environs of the present city of Allahabad.

== Adherence to Sharia ==
Shaikh Ismail strictly adhered to the basic tenets of Islam and did not like anything outside Sharia. He did not approve of singing or dancing in the name of Sam'a. He exhorted all to live a live of piety respecting their parents and fulfilling the duty of their creation by carrying out the responsibilities as the slave and vicegerent of Allah.

He erected a mosque over a small mound exactly on the banks of the Ganges and it is where he was laid down to rest after his death. To this day the mosque stands as it was erected by the Shaikh with he himself resting there.

After spending more than 50 years in that village and commanding respect from many, he died silently in 1349 AD. He was bestowed with the honorific title as "Makhdoom-i-Hind". Since centuries all the great saints of Allahabad and environs have paid their obeisance to him. No big dome and massive tomb kind of structure was erected as per his wish and no Urs rituals take place at his grave in accordance with the instructions of Shariah. He is the only saint in North India where no Urs rituals are performed; one of the most evident and striking evidence of his adherence and strict following of the Shariah.

The writer of Mirat al Asrar paid a special visit to this mosque and tomb in the reign of Shahjahan and commented " that it is a great place of Barkat".

He never allowed his name and works to be highlighted in books and discourses, so not many people know about him, even in Allahabad.

== Disciples ==
Students from all areas including Kara, Manikpur, Zafarabad, Jaunpur, Jhunsi, and Awadh, thronged to be his student. Though a lot of students were his disciples but he authorized only three students with Khailafat, Shaikh Abdul Rahim, Shaikh Ali, and Sayyid Muhammad, who used the alias Shah Karak, who eventually rose to become his most famous disciple and became popularly known as Shah Karak Majzoob (Abdal) of Kara Manikpur, Allahabad who is resting at Kara and is the most famous saint of Allahabad to this day. The fact is that he is more known than his master and mentor.

Khwaja Karak is alternatively known as Khwaja Gurg of Karra/Kara.
