= Shah Jalal Dakhini =

Sufi saint of Bangladesh

Personal life
- Born: Gujarat or Deccan
- Died: 1476 CE; Dhaka, Bengal Sultanate
- Resting place: Bangabhaban, Dilkusha, Motijheel Thana, Dhaka, Bangladesh

Religious life
- Religion: Islam
- Denomination: Sunni

Muslim leader
- Period in office: 15th century

Shah Jalal Dakhini (Bengali: শাহ জালাল দাখিনী, Arabic: شاه جلال داخني) was a 15th-century Sufi Muslim figure of Dhaka, eastern Bengal (now Bangladesh). Dakhini was one among the many Sufis who spread Islam in eastern India. Saint received an honorifics as a Dakhini as he was the resident of Deccan.

== Biography ==
It is debated whether Dakhini was originally from the Deccan Plateau in South India (as his name suggests) or that he was from Gujarat in Western India. According to 'Abd al-Haqq al-Dehlawi's Akhbar-ul-Akhyar, Dakhini studied under Shaykh Piyara in North India. Piyara was a Bengali Muslim scholar of the Chishti Order.

One day, he set off with a few companions from Gujarat to eastern Bengal, during the reign of the Sultan of Bengal Shamsuddin Yusuf Shah. He established a khanqah in present-day Motijheel, Dhaka in order to propagate Islamic teachings to the local people. He gained a large following in Dhaka, so much so that it was seemingly proportionate to the power of a king. It is said he also started to have a very pompous attitude. According to legend, the Sultan was angered by this, viewing Dakhini as a threat, and so had Dakhini and his comrades executed in 1475. Dakhini is assumed to be buried in the eastern tomb of a single-domed mazar (mausoleum) northeast of the Bangabhaban gateway.

== Legacy ==
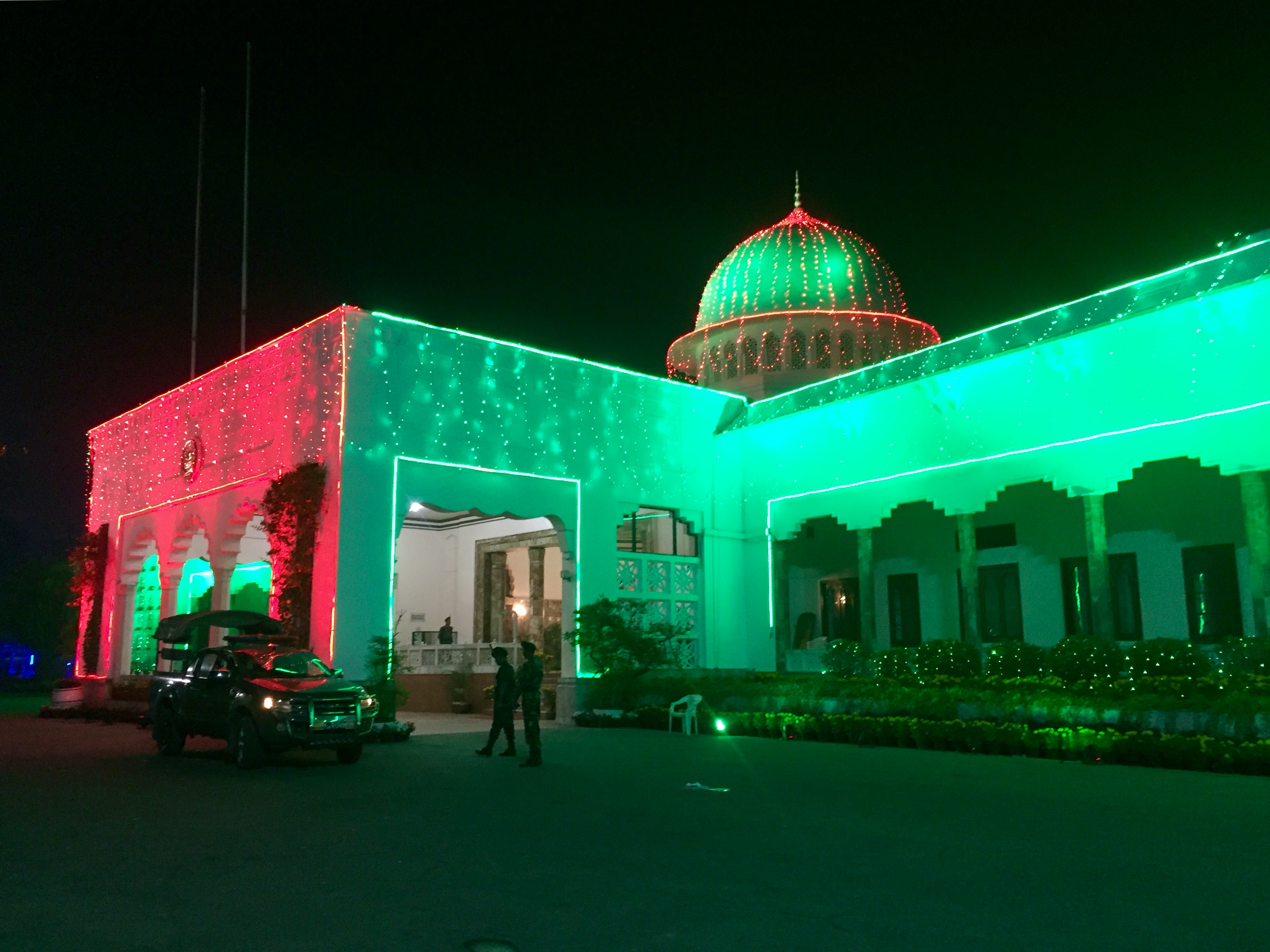
Bangabhaban at night.

Tradition holds that his tomb is within the Bangabhaban compound.
