= Bibi Jamal Khatun =

17th-century female Sufi Muslim saint

Bībī Jamāl Khātūn (Persian: بيبی جمال خاتون), also known as Bībī Jīv (d. 2 May 1647) was a Sufi woman saint of Sindh who lived in Sehwan, Sindh. She was the sister of Mian Mir.

== Biography ==
The only source for Bibi Jamal Khatun's life is Prince Dara Shikoh's book of Qadiri biographies, Sakīnat al-Awliyā, the second chapter of which is about Bibi Jamal.

Bibi Jamal Khatun's mother was called Bibi Fatima, daughter of the prominent Sufi Qazi Qadan (d. 1551). Bibi Fatima's husband died fairly early in their marriage, and Bibi Fatima brought up her children at her father's home in Sind. All of Bibi Fatima's children took an interest in Sufism, the foremost being Mian Mir (d. 1635 CE), who became the spiritual preceptor to his siblings, including Bibi Jamal Khatun. It appears that Bibi was also particularly successful in her spiritual pursuits. Dara Shikoh praised her as the Rābiʻah of her time and described several miracles attributed to her, while her brother Mian Mir referred to her spiritual exercises as an example when instructing his disciples.

Bibi Jamal Khatun did marry, but did not have children. After six years of marriage, she separated from her husband and secluded herself in her room to devote herself to a life of asceticism, prayer, and meditation. Ten years after marrying, her marriage ended, either by divorce or the death of the husband.
