= Hazart Syed Mir Tayyab Ali Shah Bukhari =

Pakistani religious and spiritual figure and former Sajjada Nashin of Karmanwala Sharif

Syed Mir Tayyab Ali Shah Bukhari

Personal life
- Born: Pakistan
- Died: 15 January 2022 Pakistan
- Parent: Syed Usman Ali Shah Bukhari (father)
- Known for: Sajjada Nashin of Karmanwala Sharif
- Relatives: Syed Samsam Ali Shah Bukhari (brother)

Religious life
- Religion: Islam

Syed Mir Tayyab Ali Shah Bukhari (died 15 January 2022) was a Pakistani religious and spiritual figure who served as the Sajjada Nashin (hereditary spiritual custodian) of the shrine of Karmanwala Sharif in Okara District, Punjab, Pakistan. He belonged to the Bukhari Sayyid family associated with the shrine.

== Early life and family ==
Syed Mir Tayyab Ali Shah Bukhari belonged to the Bukhari Sayyid family of Karmanwala Sharif. According to available sources, he was a grandson of Syed Muhammad Ismail Shah Bukhari, commonly known as Karman Walay, and a son of Syed Usman Ali Shah Bukhari.

His elder brother, Syed Samsam Ali Shah Bukhari, was a Pakistani politician who served as a provincial and federal minister.

The available reliable sources used for this article do not establish a sufficiently documented date and place of birth.

== Sajjada Nashin of Karmanwala Sharif ==
According to a study of the shrine of Karmanwala Sharif, Syed Mir Tayyab Ali Shah Bukhari served as its Sajjada Nashin from 1993. The study describes him as the third Sajjada Nashin of the shrine.

During his period as Sajjada Nashin, the shrine remained associated with religious education, spiritual gatherings, social welfare activities and Founded Worldwide Concept of Milad e Mustafa صَلَّى ٱللَّٰهُ عَلَيْهِ وَسَلَّمَ. Sources discussing Karmanwala Sharif mention institutions and facilities associated with the shrine, including a mosque, madrasa, hospital, library, langar and facilities for religious gatherings.

== Religious and social activities ==
Syed Mir Tayyab Ali Shah Bukhari participated in religious gatherings associated with Karmanwala Sharif. A report published by Dawn in 2010 mentioned his address during the annual urs of Karmanwala Sharif.

The shrine's activities have included religious education, spiritual instruction, preaching and charitable services.

== Karmanwala Sharif ==
Karmanwala Sharif is a Sufi centre located in Okara District, Punjab, between Okara and Renala Khurd. The shrine is associated with Syed Muhammad Ismail Shah Bukhari and the Naqshbandi Sufi tradition.

Syed Mir Tayyab Ali Shah Bukhari was associated with plans for the development of educational facilities connected with Karmanwala Sharif, including the proposed Karmanwala University.

== Death ==
Syed Mir Tayyab Ali Shah Bukhari died on 15 January 2022. According to the Associated Press of Pakistan, his funeral prayer was held at Darbar Hazrat Karmanwala Sharif on the same day after the Asr prayer. The report described him as the Sajjada Nashin of Karmanwala Sharif and the younger brother of Syed Samsam Ali Shah Bukhari.

== Annual urs ==
Following his death, annual commemorative gatherings associated with Syed Mir Tayyab Ali Shah Bukhari continued to be reported at Karmanwala Sharif. A report published in 2023 covered the annual urs held at the shrine.

== See also ==
- Karmanwala Sharif
- Sufism
- Naqshbandi
- Islam in Pakistan
- Sajjada Nashin
