= Shah Niamatullah =

Wali of pre-Mughal period

Shah Niamatullah Butshikan
- Resting place: Dilkusha, Dhaka, Bangladesh

Religious life
- Religion: Islam
- Denomination: Sunni

Muslim leader
- Based in: Dhaka

Shah Niamatullah Butshikan (Bengali: শাহ নিয়ামতউল্লাহ বুতশিকন, Persian: شاه نعمت الله بتشكن) was a wali of the pre-Mughal Empire period. He preached Islam in the Indian subcontinent. His grave is situated in Dilkusha, Dhaka.

== Biography ==
The common understanding is that Niamatullah was originally a prince of Baghdad in modern-day Iraq. Adopting a spartan and disciplined lifestyle he went to the Indian subcontinent to preach Islam. Settling in Bengal he established his khanqah in Dhaka. He is credited with converting a large number of people to Islam, becoming known as a wali or saint. His shrine is situated in Dilkusha, Dhaka. Khwaja Abdul Ghani financed the reconstruction of his shrine.
