= Keramat Habib Noh =

Historic mausoleum on Mount Palmer, Singapore

Keramat Habib Noh Maqam Habib Noh (مقام حبيب نوح) Hābǐnuò Shèngfén (哈比诺圣坟)
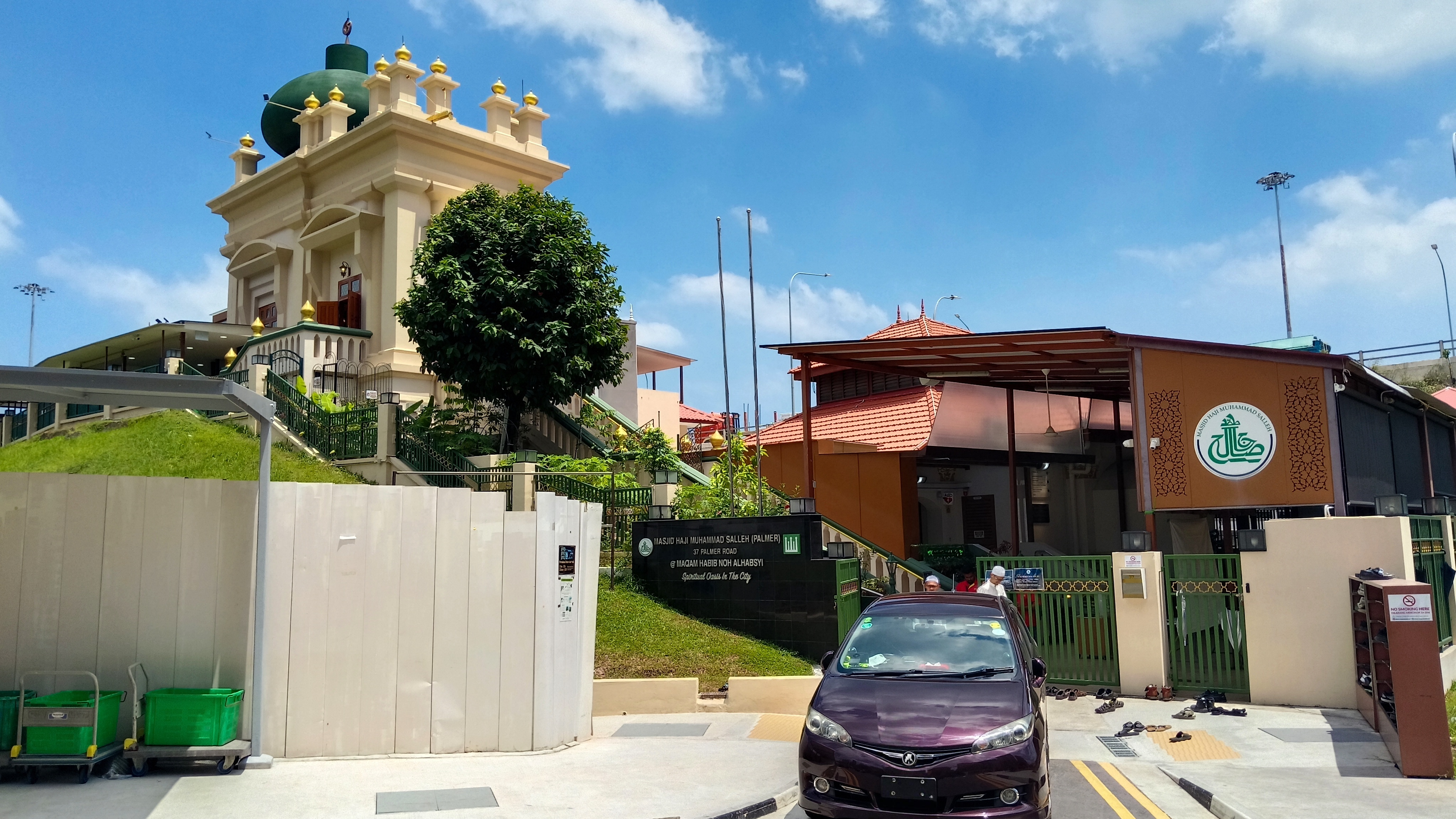

- Location in Singapore

Religion
- Affiliation: Sunni Islam

Location
- Location: 37 Palmer Road, Singapore 079424
- Country: Singapore
- Coordinates: 1.2728335°N 103.8473644°E

Architecture
- Type: Mausoleum, shrine
- Style: Eclectic
- Founder: Syed Mohamed bin Ahmed Alsagoff
- Completed: 1890; 1987 (Reconstruction)
- Dome: 1

Keramat Habib Noh, also known as the Maqam Habib Noh (Jawi: مقام حبيب نوح), is a mausoleum located on Mount Palmer at edge of the Central Area, Singapore. Situated on a foothill, it is built in 1890 over the tomb of a Muslim sage named Habib Noh. Next to the mausoleum, below the hill, is the Haji Muhammad Salleh Mosque, a congregational mosque that is registered under the Majlis Ugama Islam Singapura.

== History ==
Habib Noh al-Habsyi, a sage of the Islamic faith who came from Kedah, was laid to rest on the foothill of Mount Palmer in 1866. Folklore has it that his corpse was originally set to be buried at a royal cemetery in Johor, but his coffin became unmovable until the pallbearers swore to bury him at Mount Palmer. A year later, his cousin Abdul Rahman al-Habsyi was also buried next to him in 1867. Syed Mohamed bin Ahmed Alsagoff, an Arab Muslim diplomat and philanthropist, constructed a domed mausoleum over the tomb of Habib Noh in 1890. One of Habib Noh's followers, a merchant from Batavia named Ḥājji Muḥammad Ṣāliḥ, endowed land next to the mausoleum for a mosque to be built, which was completed in late 1902 and named the Haji Muhammad Salleh Mosque after its founder. Management of the mosque was later handed over to the Majlis Ugama Islam Singapura (MUIS) in 1968. Both the mausoleum and the mosque next to it were rebuilt in 1987 under orders from the MUIS.

In 2017, an elevator was added to the side of Keramat Habib Noh to allow elderly worshippers to visit the shrine of Habib Noh without climbing the staircase to the building. Then in 2024, the mausoleum, now known as the Maqam Habib Noh, was closed down for an extensive renovation project. Reconstruction works on the exterior of Keramat Habib Noh as well as strengthening works on the entrance staircase were completed by 11 January 2026.

== Architecture ==
Keramat Habib Noh sits on a hill that was formerly part of Mount Palmer. A grand staircase of fifty steps leads up to the main entrance. The central chamber of the mausoleum, which contains the tomb of Habib Noh, is topped by a dome, with the grave itself sitting in the centre of the floor, while that of Abdul Rahman al-Habsyi can be found approximately seven meters away outside the chamber in the same building. The grave of Habib Noh is covered with a wooden canopy and adorned with an elaborately carved marble tombstone, known as a dapur, which was a gift from a merchant named Syed Abdul Rahman from the Alsagoff family. The concrete floor of the mausoleum is wide to allow offerings of food such as glutinous rice or fruits, which are then gathered together and distributed to the poor. The design of the structure is also influenced by traditional Hindu temple architecture as well, although with an eclectic blend of European elements.

The congregational mosque, Masjid Haji Muhammad Salleh, sits on a raised ground below the hill. It is built in a traditional Malay architectural style, with tiered a tiered roof and wooden beams. Attached to the mosque is a library which contains a hundred books from the personal collection of Syed Isa Semait, the former Mufti of Singapore. Behind the mosque is an extended prayer space that is covered with a glass canopy. The mosque can also accommodate a total of nine hundred congregants.

== Transportation ==
Keramat Habib Noh is within walking distance from both the Prince Edward Road MRT station and the Shenton Way Bus Terminal.

== See also ==
- Islam in Singapore
- List of mosques in Singapore
