= Habib Noh =

Arab mystic in Singapore (1788–1866)

Wali Habib Noh bin Mohamad Al-Habshi
- حبيب نوح بن محمد الحبشي

Personal life
- Born: Habib Noh bin Mohamad Al-Habshi; 1788 On a ship en-route to Penang Island
- Died: July 27, 1866 (aged 78) Singapore, Straits Settlements

Religious life
- Religion: Islam
- Denomination: Sunni
- School: Shafi'i
- Tariqa: Ba 'Alawiyya

Habib Noh bin Mohamad Al-Habshi (Arabic: حبيب نوح بن محمد الحبشي; 1788 – 27 July 1866) was an Arab mystic who is regarded in Sufism as a wali (Islamic saint). Allegedly a descendant of Muhammad, Habib Noh was raised in Penang. He also spent some time in neighbouring Kedah, before settling down in Singapore.

== Personal life ==
Habib Noh's family allegedly descended from Muhammad and lived in the now-Yemeni part of Hadhramaut. According to tradition, Habib Noh was born in 1788 on a ship en route to Penang Island, where he was raised. His father, Mohamad Alhabshee, worked for the British colonial government in Penang. The family also lived in Kedah for a brief period.

Around 1819, at the invitation of Syekh Salim bin Abdullah Sumayr, and shortly after Singapore had been designated as a British settlement, Habib Noh relocated to Tanjong Pagar. Habib Noh would remain in Singapore for the rest of his life, although he seldom ventured beyond his house and the Arab Street-based Sultan Mosque. He also meditated on Mount Palmer and reportedly enjoyed watching Chinese opera performances at a nearby Buddhist temple.

In his lifetime, Habib Noh was already recognised as a wali or saint in the Sufi tradition, specifically as the "patron saint of Malay sailors".

== Death and legacy ==
Habib Noh died on 27 July 1866 in Telok Blangah, at the age of 78. His funeral was reportedly attended by "thousands of pilgrims". As legend has it, he was to be buried in another Muslim cemetery, but his casket proved to be unmovable until "someone remembered his wish to be laid to rest at the peak of Mount Palmer". Moreover, the putative owner of Mount Palmer died three days after selling the plot of land in which Habib Noh would be buried. A mausoleum was established in 1890 by Arabian philanthropist Syed Mohamad bin Ahmad Alsagoff.

According to Torsten Tschacher, Habib Noh "is certainly the most popular contemporary saint in contemporary Singapore". A 2021 study noted that his tomb "is frequented till today by visitors of various ethnoreligious backgrounds". When the Japanese attacked Singapore in World War II, Habib Noh's tomb "was untouched by bombs or shells that fell about the harbour". According to legend, efforts to redevelop his resting place have allegedly been foiled by the spirit of Habib Noh himself, with extraordinary incidents such as "exploding bulldozers" being reported. In November 2022, teenage student Muhammad Irfan Danyal Mohamad Nor was arrested for, among other things, planning to blow up Habib Noh's tomb because he believed that it was "un-Islamic".
