= Makhdoom Ali Mahimi =

Indian saint and scholar (1372–1431)

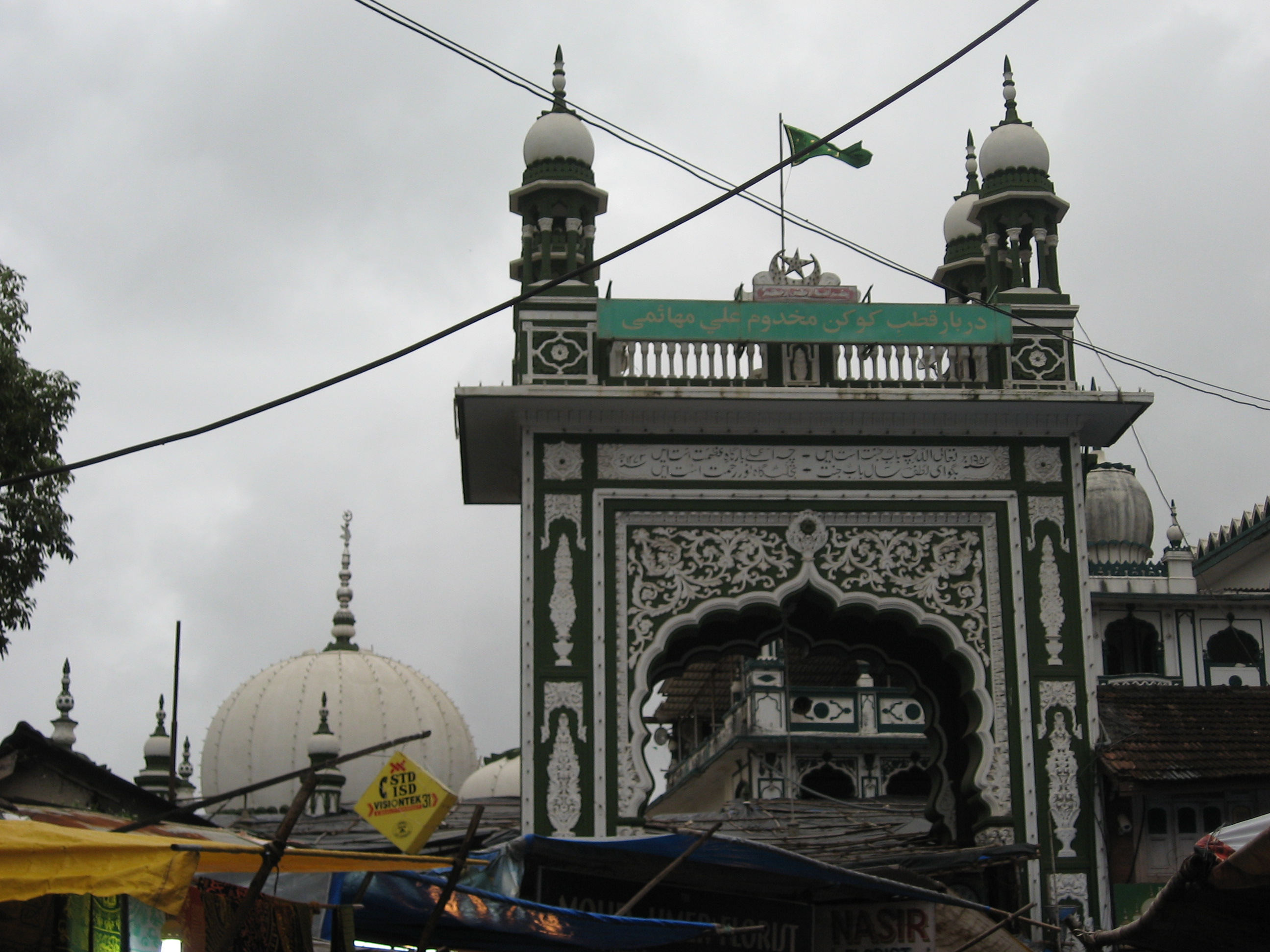
- Dargah of Mahimi in Mahim
- Title: Quṭb-e-Kokan

Personal life
- Born: 1372 Mahim, Bombay Islands, Tughlaq Sultanate
- Died: 1431 (aged 58–59) Mahim
- Resting place: Mahim Dargah, Mumbai
- Notable work(s): Tafsir al-Mahaimi and over 100 treatises
- Known for: First Indian mufassir
- Relatives: Ahmad Shah I (brother-in-law); Muhammad Shah I (father-in-law)
- Website: www.makhdumalimahimi.org

Religious life
- Religion: Islam
- Denomination: Sunni
- Jurisprudence: Shafi'i
- Tariqa: Kubrawi

Muslim leader
- Post: Qazi of Mahim
- Period in office: 14th–15th century
- Influenced by: Mir Sayyid Ali Hamadani

Makhdoom Ali Mahimi Shafi'i (1372–1431 C.E) was a saint and scholar of international repute. He lived during the time of the Tughlaq dynasty and that of Sultan Ahmed Shah of Gujarat, and was married to the Sultan's sister. He is widely acknowledged for his scholarly treatises, liberal views and humanist ideals. Mahimi was born into a family of Arab travelers from Iraq who had settled down on the island of Mahim known as Nawayath, one of the seven islands that later formed the city of Bombay (now Mumbai).

== Biography ==
Not much is known of his early childhood. He later became the follower of disciples of Mir Sayyid Ali Hamadani ShafI'i and became the master of Kubrawiya order. Mahimi's reputation grew after the Sultan of Gujarat, Ahmed Shah of the Muzaffarid dynasty, chose him to be the town's Qazi (the Head Muslim Judge/Cleric of a town).

Mahimi was the first Indian scholar to write an exegesis on the Qur'an, which gained critical acclimation from numerous Islamic scholars including Shah Waliullah Dehlavi. He authored more than 100 books but only 21 books are known, from which only 10 books are available in different libraries in India, he was given the moniker Qutub-e -Kokan (Kokan's Pole Star). He was the first commentator of the Quran in India. His commentary is called "Tafsir al-Mahaimi." It is available in Al Azhar University, Cairo and Ummul-Qura University, Makkah and Markaz Saqafathi sunniyya.

Mahimi is revered by both the Muslims and Hindus. All Muslim sects hold him in high esteem. After his death in 1431, he was buried in Mahim. The site later became a Dargah (shrine) for devotees.

== Urs festival ==
During the annual ten-day Urs festival celebrated on the 13th day of Shawwal as per the Muslim calendar, millions of devotees visit his dargah.

The highlight of this is a procession of around eight thousand begins at the Mahim Police Station, believed to be the site of his residence. Two police officers from each of the eighty four city police stations represent the police whose association with the saint dates back to the saint's era. A representative of the Mumbai police who is the first to offer the "chaddar" (shawl) at the tomb on the first day of the festival. Legend has it that it was a police constable who gave water to the dying saint from his cap. Another story points to some miraculous assistance police officers once received from an old man, who they believed was the saint, in fighting smugglers.

A room adjacent to the office of the senior inspector of police station contains a steel cupboard that houses the saint's preserved belongings such as his chair, a pair of sandals and his hand-written Qur'an which is considered to be a calligraphic work of art. The room is opened once every year to the public. In 1920 the cupboard was purchased by a senior British police inspector, Raymond Esquire as a tribute to the saint he revered.

On 2005-05-21, the government of Maharashtra named the JJ flyover after the saint as a tribute to the saint. The 2.1 kilometre flyover is the longest viaduct in the country.

== See also ==
- Sufism
- Mahim
- 2006 Mumbai "Sweet" Seawater Incident
- Konkani Muslims
- Konkan
- Makhdoom
