= Muhammad Tegh Ali =

Saint of the Qadri Sufi order

Muhammad Tegh Ali (Urdu: محمد تیغ علی; died 14 October 1958) popularly known as Sarkar-e-Surkanhi was an Indian Islamic scholar and sufi saint of the Qadri order. He is buried in Kanti, Muzaffarpur district of Bihar.

== Khanqah Abadaniya ==
He returned to his native and shifted to Surkanhi Sharif and established Khanqah, a center of Sufism with Madarsa Alimia, a centre of education were established. He spread all his teachings to the people and taught them what he regarded as the correct way to preach Islam by doing tabliqh.

== Death ==
Tegh Ali died on 1 Rabi' al-thani 1378 (14 October 1958) at 6:35 pm.

== See also ==
- Islam in India
- Sufism in India
