= Haji Huud =

Hazrat Khwaja Sultan Sayyed Haji Hud
- Title: Sirajul Hind, Shere Saani, Qutbul Aqtab

Personal life
- Born: 1025 Syria
- Died: 16 October 1142 (15 Rajab 536 AH) Patan, Gujarat, India

Religious life
- Religion: Islam
- Order: Chishti Order

Muslim leader
- Based in: Patan, Gujarat, India
- Period in office: Late 11th century and early 12th century

Haji Hud (1025 – 16 October 1142) was a prominent Muslim saint who migrated to India and settled there for propagation of Islam.

== Birth and early life ==
Haji Hud was born in 416 Hijri (1025 A. D.) in Khanfur near Damascus in Syria. His ancestry reaches to Imam Hussain ibn Ali through Imam Mohammad Baqir. His father Sultan Sayyed Avvana Subhani Abdullāh dreamed that he received a message from Mohammad that he would be blessed with a pious son. He was advised to name him 'Hud'.

== As King of Samarqand ==
At a young age Haji Hud was excelled in the administration of Samarkand. He was fully responsible for all the duties as the king but most his time was spent in Ibaadat. In 444 Hijri, he dreamed that Muhammad told him to leave the kingdom and spend the rest of his life in the path of Islamic devotion. Aged 28, he forfeited the throne and traveled to Mecca along with his associates.

== In Mecca and Medina ==
He lived in Mecca for 36 years and went for Hajj 36 times as mentioned in "Pirnama". His days in Mecca and then in Medina were spent in constant Ibadat and Riyazat.

It is mentioned in "Muqasifat e Mohammadiya" that once in Medina, near the shrine of the prophet, Haji Hud was reciting the Durood and spontaneously words came out from his mouth 'Ya Jadadi (O Grandfather)'. In reply a sound came from the Roza 'Ya Waladi (O Son)'. Since then he acquired a Mehboobiyat and then got divine inspiration to go to India for tableegh of Islam.

== Travels ==
From Medina, Haji Hud went to Chisht via Yemen. It was a prominent religious learning center of its time. There, he met Khwaja Sayyed Nasiruddin Abu Yusuf Chishti and pledged Bai'at to him. Haji Hud's spiritual capabilities increased tremendously during this time. He was then given the "Khilafat" from the Peer along with gifts such as a prayer mat, asa mubarak, naalain and is given the title of "Qutub". Peer sahib asked him then to go and settle in Patan, a city in India.

== Arrival in Patan ==
Then he went to Samarqand and got the titles of Abul Barakat, Shere Sani, Qutbul Aqtaab and from there he started journey towards India with 200 other people. Among others he was accompanied by his son Ismail Qadri, his Vazier Haji Hussain Rumi and the prince of Syria.

They eventually arrived in Patan. Patan was the capital of Gujarat at that time and ruled by Karandev Solanki (1064-1092 A.D.). He and his associates were the first Muslims to arrive in Patan.

Before he came to Patan, he went to Samarkand and got the titles of Abul Barakat, Shere Sani, Kutbul Aktaab and he was joined by 200 others in his travel to Patan. Among others he was accompanied by his son Ismail Kadri, his Vazier Haji Hussain, Ruum and the prince of Syria. Patan was then the capital of Gujarat and ruled by Karandev Solanki. He with his associates were the first Muslims to arrive in Patan.

"Shud Musalmani Bina Zaate Paakash Dar Patan Deene Ahmed Gashta Roshan Badare Aalam Shah Huud"

He camped in an open area. In front of it temple. There were idols in the temple that were decorated with precious diamonds and pearls along with a storage of gold and silver.

Haji Huud and his associated arrived there right at Asar time. They prayed the Asar prayer and as soon as they were done, the tiger started running to them. Everyone there was scared, but Haji Huud reassured everyone that the tiger was going to come to him only and he will kill it. Then, when the tiger did attack, Haji Huud got hold of its jaws and tore the animal in two pieces. The priests if the temple watching this ran to the king Karandev and narrated the incident to him. They told him that some foreigners have arrived to out land and they are very strong, good looking and very wise. They have killed our temple's tiger and if these people are allowed to stay, they will take over our kingdom. Hearing this Karandev was furious and ordered his army to arrest the visitors.

As the army started approaching Haji Huud and his accomplices, the soldiers started sinking into the ground. Some went as deep as their chests. They were unable to come out of the ground and gave up. They started requesting Haji Huud for help. On hearing their plea, he asked the earth to release the soldiers. He told them, "I have not come to take something form you, but to show you the straight path ( siratal mustakim ). Allah is one and only the one worthy of worship. Hazrat Mohammad Mustafa is his prophet". These words were so effective that the whole army of Rajputs accepted Islam.

" Sabne padha Kalma, kufar toda, hue sab Musalmeen, Unko nikale kaidse, bujo tume kar kar yakeen, Hai Chavde, Rathod, Solanki, Padhiyar jo, Kai tarahke hai gee so jata hai asav Rajputyo"

When the king Karandev heard about this, he was really amazed. It was said that anyone who saw the holy man, could see a noor in his eyes and could see the kalme tauheed on one eye and shamshire tauheed in the other. They would instantly become his devotee. Raja Karandev arrived there to see him. Haji Huud asked him "Who do your worship?". The king replied, "Our God is in that temple". He then took Haji Huud to the temple and showed him all kinds of idols, and the most prominent and decorated one of them was his main God. Then Haji Huud pointed his finger to that idol and said "So this is your God". With that said, the idol fell to the ground and crumbled to pieces. Seeing this miracle, Karadev was impressed and started to respect the holy man. He gave permission for them to settle down in Patan and gave all the assistance to do that. He accepted Islam and built the first mosque in Patan called Masjid Karana.

"Deed chun Raja Karan aan Shah ra shud moatked az dilo jaan shud Musalmeen sadare aalam Shah Huud" -Hazrat Haji Hussain .

== In Patan ==
Haji Hud stayed in Patan for 51 years. Thousands accepted Islam under his influence. Thereby he earned the title of Mublligh e Azam. He is one of the pioneer peers to spread Islam in Gujarat. Others being Baba Rehan, Peer Sayyed Sharfuddin Mohammad (Peer Faluda), and Peer Sayyed Shahabuddin Ibne Sayyed Zahiruddin from Bharuch, Surat, and Kathiawad respectively.

Haji Hud's son Ismail got khilafat from Ghaus-e-azam Pirane peer dastagir.

There were several notable scholars among the descendants of Haji Hud. Makhdum Qazi Ahmed Jood (One of the four Ahmeds after whom Ahmedabad is named) and Ghaus ul Wara Hasan Faqih were among them.

== Death ==
Haji Hud died on 15th Rajab 536 Hijri (16 October 1142 A.D.) aged 117 years. His mazaar is in Patan near the Khan Sarovar.

== See also ==
- Urs (Ajmer)
- Qadiriyyah
- List of Sufism related topics
- List of famous Sufis
- Sufism
- Sayyid
