= Hazrat Babajan =

Indian Sufi

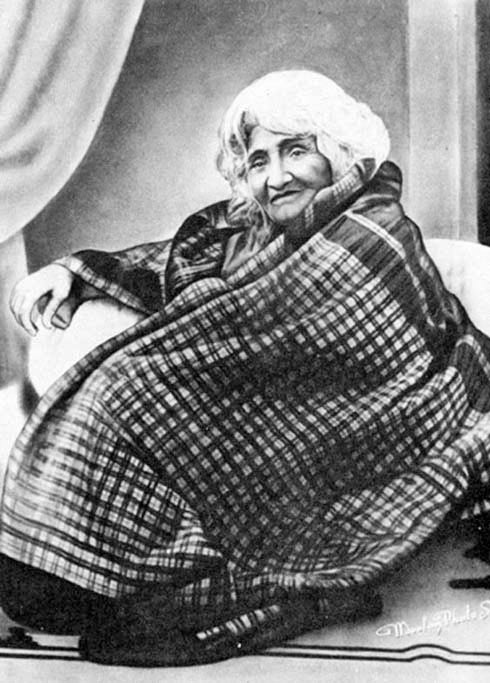
- Babajan in Pune, India
- Born: Balochistan, Afghanistan
- Died: 21 September 1931; Pune, India

Philosophical work
- Era: 20th century
- Region: South Asia
- School: Sufism

Hazrat Babajaan (Balochi/Pashto: حضرت باباجان; various dates claimed – September 21, 1931) was a Pashtun Muslim saint considered by her followers to be a satguru or qutb.

Born in Afghan portion of Balochistan, she lived the final 25 years of her life in Pune, India. She was the original master of Meher Baba, an Indian spiritual master.

== Life ==
=== Early life ===
The earliest recorded account of Hazrat Babajan, who was named at birth Gulrukh ("face like a rose") states that she: "is the daughter of one of the ministers of the Emir of Afghanistan". Later accounts report that Babajan "hails from Afghanistan […] and was the daughter of a well-to-do Afghan of noble lineage"; "born to a royal Muslim family of Baluchistan [sic]". The precise date of Babajan's birth is unclear. Biography variants range from 1790 to around 1820. Her education was in keeping with her family's social status of that time. Well-educated, she was fluent in Arabic, Persian, and Urdu, in addition to her native Pashto. She was also a hafiza, one who learns the Quran by heart. An introspective child and spiritually inclined, from "early life she developed mystical tendencies, and unlike girls of her age, she used to pass a good deal of her time in prayers, meditation and solitude".

Following the conventions of Afghan nobility, Babajan was reared under the strict purdah tradition, in which women were secluded from the outside world, and also subject to a custom of arranged marriages. She opposed an unwelcome marriage planned for her, and ran away from home on her wedding day at the age of eighteen. Disguised in her burqa, she journeyed to Peshawar, the frontier city at the foot of the Khyber Pass. It was in or near Peshawar that she eventually came into contact with a Hindu satguru. Following instruction from the guru:

"She went into seclusion in a nearby mountain outside Rawalpindi and underwent very severe [riyazat] (spiritual austerities) for nearly seventeen months. Thereafter she came down to [the] Punjab and stayed a few months in Multan. It was in Multan, while [Babajan] was 37 years of age, she contacted a Muslim saint […] who put end to her spiritual struggle by giving her God-realisation."

After that experience she returned to Rawalpindi to reconnect with the Hindu guru who, after several years, helped her return to normal consciousness.

=== Travels and pilgrimages ===
After a second stay in Rawalpindi with her earlier Hindu master, Babajan embarked on several long journeys through various Middle Eastern countries Syria, Lebanon, and Iraq, and: "It is said that she traveled to Mecca disguised as a man [apparently to avoid detection] by way of Afghanistan, Iran, Turkey and doubling back into Arabia." At the Kaaba, she offered salah (prayers) five times a day, always sitting at one selected spot. While in Mecca, Babajan often gathered food for the poor and personally nursed hajjis (pilgrims) who had fallen ill.

From Mecca, Babajan made pilgrimage to the tomb of the Islamic prophet Muhammad in Medina, where she adopted the same routine of offering prayers and caring for fellow pilgrims. Leaving Arabia, she passed through Baghdad, Iraq and back to the Punjab. She then traveled south to Nasik and established herself there. From Nasik, Babajan travelled to Bombay (Mumbai), where she stayed for some time and her fame grew.

In April 1903, she made a second pilgrimage to Mecca, this time sailing from Bombay on the SS Haidari. About 1904, Babajan returned to Bombay and soon afterward proceeded to Ajmer in northern India to pay homage at the tomb of the Sufi saint Moinuddin Chishti who established the Chishti Order of Islam in India. From Ajmer she again returned to Bombay and then soon after traveled east to Pune.

=== Residence in Pune ===
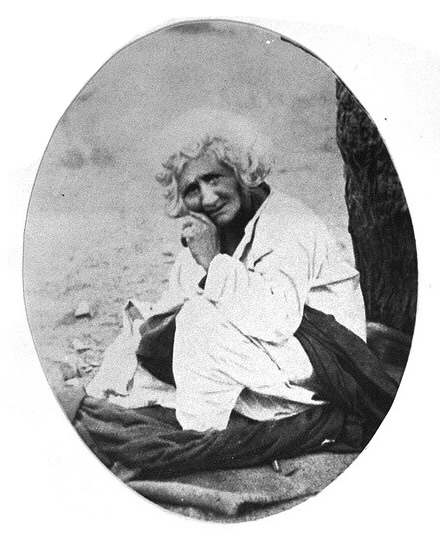
Babajan under her neem tree in Char Bavadi, Pune

By 1905 Babajan arrived in Pune, where she established her final residence. Now an old woman, her back slightly bent, shoulders rounded, with white matted hair, and shabbily dressed, she "was seen sitting or resting at odd places, in different parts of the city". Babajan finally located to a slum area called Char Bawdi ("four wells") on Malcolm Tank Road, part of a British Army cantonment.

The Char Bawdi area at that time has been described as "a picture of dirt, desolation and ugliness, a breeding spot of plague and pestilence and a regular haunt of dangerous riff-raffs by night". After several months’ exposure to the natural elements, Babajan grudgingly allowed her devotees to build a basic shelter of gunny sacks above her. Children were in the habit of throwing stones at her. She was a homeless faqir. The gifts from her devotees were shared among the poor and destitute, and in some instances stolen from her by thieves. She remained indifferent to the material offerings or the loss. Gradually, out of devotion, or mere curiosity, increasing numbers of people from Pune and elsewhere sought her out. Several alleged miracles have been attributed to Babajan.

According to one observer, within a decade of Babajan taking residence:

"The [Char Bawdi] locality underwent a metamorphosis surpassing all expectations. What with the featural changes in the buildings all around, electrified tea-shops ringing with the clatter of cups and saucers, a concourse of peoples consisting of all ranks and creeds waiting for Babajan’s darshana, a street bard entertaining the crowd with his music, the beggars clamouring for alms, easy-going idlers standing indiscriminately hampering vehicular traffic and the whole atmosphere heavily laden with sweet burning incense perpetually kept burning near Babajan, presented a scene typically Eastern, leaving an indelible impression on one’s memory."

=== Master to Meher Baba ===
In May 1913, Merwan Sheriar Irani, then nineteen years old, was riding his bicycle on the way to class at Deccan College, when he looked up and saw Babajan sitting under a neem tree surrounded by a crowd. He had cycled past on previous occasions but had never paid much attention to her, though he was aware that she was regarded by some as a Muslim saint; yet others thought her "a mad woman or a witch or sorceress". His father, Sheriar Irani, held Babajan in high regard. Born into a Zoroastrian family, Sheriar Irani had been an itinerant dervish for a number of years, before finally settling in Pune and marrying.

Babajan beckoned Merwan, who in turn was drawn towards her. For several months thereafter Merwan Irani would visit the saint; they would sit together yet seldom spoke. One night during January 1914, he was about to leave, and before doing so kissed Babajan’s hands, and she in turn held his face in her hands. She then kissed him on the forehead, during which he received her spiritual grace (barakah). The event subsequently left Merwan Irani in an enraptured state in which he remained abstracted from his normal surroundings for nearly nine months. The young man would later become known as Meher Baba.

=== Final years ===
In 1930, several months before Babajan died, then journalist Paul Brunton visited her. He wrote: "She lies, in full view of passers-by, upon a low divan [...] Her head is propped by pillows. The lustrous whiteness of her silky hair offers sad contrast to the heavily wrinkled face and seamed brow". The meeting was brief. Yet Brunton was clearly emotionally affected, and afterwards, in his hotel room, he reflected: "That some deep psychological attainment really resides in the depths of her being, I am certain".

On 18 September 1931, one of Babajan’s fingers was operated on at Sassoon Hospital, but afterwards she did not appear to be recovering. According to one version, a few days before she died, Babajan muttered: "It is time […] time for me to leave now. The work is over […] I must close the shop". One of the devotees pleaded: "Do not say such things Babajan, we need you with us". But she cryptically replied: "Nobody, nobody wants my wares. Nobody can afford the price. I have turned my goods over to the Proprietor".

== Shrine ==
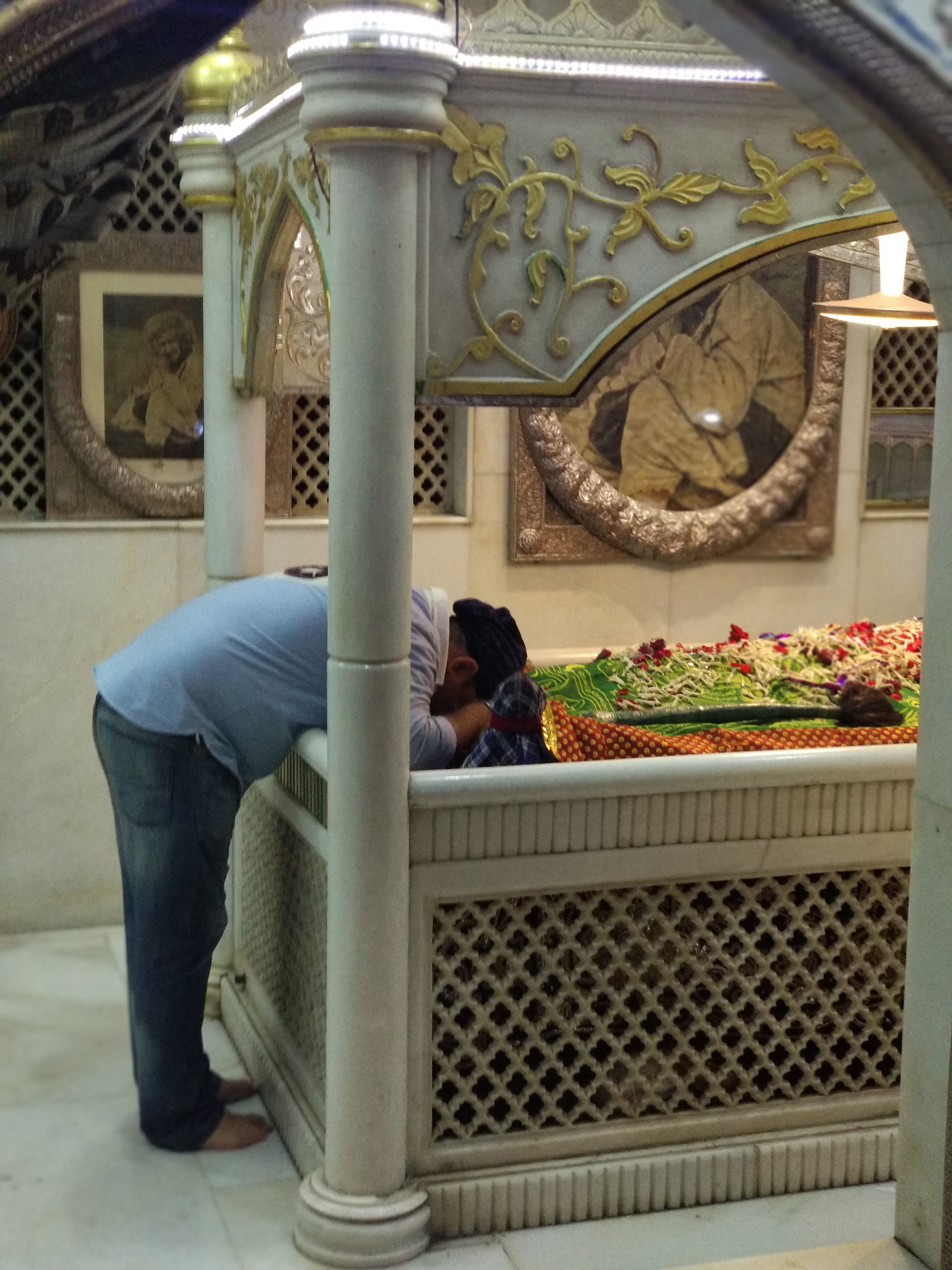
Babajan Shrine in Pune, India

Hazrat Babajan died in the Char Bawdi section of Pune on 21 September 1931. On Wednesday, 23 September, The Evening News of India reported her death. The newspaper article informed that the "Muslim community in [Pune] has been greatly moved by the death of the famous saint [...] Her funeral yesterday […] was very largely attended with thousands of people both Muslims and Hindus taking part in the procession".

The white marble dargah (shrine) of Babajan was built alongside the neem tree under which she had sat, by the roadside which is now a busy thoroughfare. Her dargah is frequented by people of all religions.

== Biographical discrepancies ==
There are a few discrepancies to be found in the current biographies of Hazrat Babajan which require due mention.

Firstly, much of the accepted information about Babajan appears to have been established solely on the authority of Meher Baba, a fact acknowledged by Dr Abdul Ghani Munsiff, who in 1939 wrote the first life-sketch of Babajan. According to Ghani:

"The information gleaned from different sources is meagre, since Babajan herself was never communicative to anyone with regard to her life history. The facts of her early life and those relating to her spiritual career have all been confirmed by Hazrat Meher Baba, her chief disciple and spiritual Chargeman (khalifa)."

Yet, Meher Baba appears to have provided and endorsed two different versions of Babajan’s life.

=== Earliest records ===
Over a decade before Dr Ghani’s life-sketch of Babajan appeared, in 1927 Meher Baba gave a public talk on Babajan, which a devotee had recorded in a diary at that time. This is currently the earliest account of Babajan’s life. The people being addressed were predominantly women, and the story was told to provide a moral. To summarize the essentials of that brief talk:

Hazrat Babajan is the daughter of one of the then responsible and chief ministers of the Emir of Afghanistan at Kabul. From early childhood she had a natural inclination toward spirituality and the realization of Truth. When Babajan was fifteen years of age her guardians began to arrange for her marriage, at this juncture she made bold to leave the family home. For fifty years thereafter she led a life of complete resignation and renunciation.

After wandering from place to place for fifty long years she at last came across her Master, and became God-realized at the age of about sixty-five. After being God-realized Babajan lived for some time […] in the Punjab. During this stay many people began to respect her as a saint. Her occasional remarks, declaring herself to be God [Ana'l-Haqq, "I am the Truth"] upset the Muslim population, and fanatical Muslim Baloch soldiers (sepoys) of a local military regiment buried Babajan alive.

After a lapse of many years, during the World War I, the Baluchi regiment was transferred to Pune, and in that city the same soldiers came face-to-face with Babajan sitting under her neem tree at Char Bawdi. Fanaticism was transformed into devotion, and as long as the regiment remained stationed at Pune, the soldiers came to pay their respects to Babajan.

Ghani’s later, and extended, version of Babajan’s life, published in 1939, provides a different account; She left home at the age of eighteen on her wedding day. Eventually came into contact with a Hindu sadguru at Rawalpindi. Later went down to the Punjab, and when she was thirty-seven met a Muslim saint in Multan who gave her God-Realization. After the Baloch soldiers encountered her again in Pune: "her saintly fame spread far and wide, and she came to be universally known as Hazrat Babajan".

=== Babajan’s age ===
Babajan’s alleged age when she died continues to be a controversial issue. Biography variants for her date of birth range from 1790 to c. 1820. The earliest birth dates are provided by Charles B. Purdom and Bhau Kalchuri. Purdom was merely reporting the opinion of devotees, and so he qualified what he wrote: "her actual date of birth is not known; it is supposed to have been about 1790". Kalchuri is more dogmatic, and states Babajan was born "between 1790 and 1800", and her "physical presence on earth lasted between 130 to 141 years". At the other end of the scale, in his colourful spiritual travel book, A Search in Secret India (1934), the then freelance journalist, Paul Brunton, recounts that he learnt "from former Judge Khandalawalla, who had known [Hazrat Babajan] for fifty years, that her age is really about ninety-five". Brunton had arrived in India, November 1930, and had left several months before Babajan’s death in September 1931.

Regarding Brunton’s report, Kevin R. D. Shepherd observed: "That Khandalawalla had known Babajan for as long as fifty years is questionable; though it need not be doubted that he had encountered her by the time of her second visit to Bombay c. 1900". Shepherd concluded:

"The general computation of her age was about 120 years, though some maintained that it was in excess of this. Purdom cited an approximate date of 1790 for her birth, though Ghani was of the view that she was born later than this. Ghani’s estimate of her age was 125, based on general reminiscences and his own contact with her. In deference to critical tendencies which find the higher estimates indigestible, there seems every ground to believe that the subject was over a hundred by the time of her death."

== See also ==
- Meher Baba
- Paul Brunton
