= Badarpur, Assam =

Badarpur
- Town
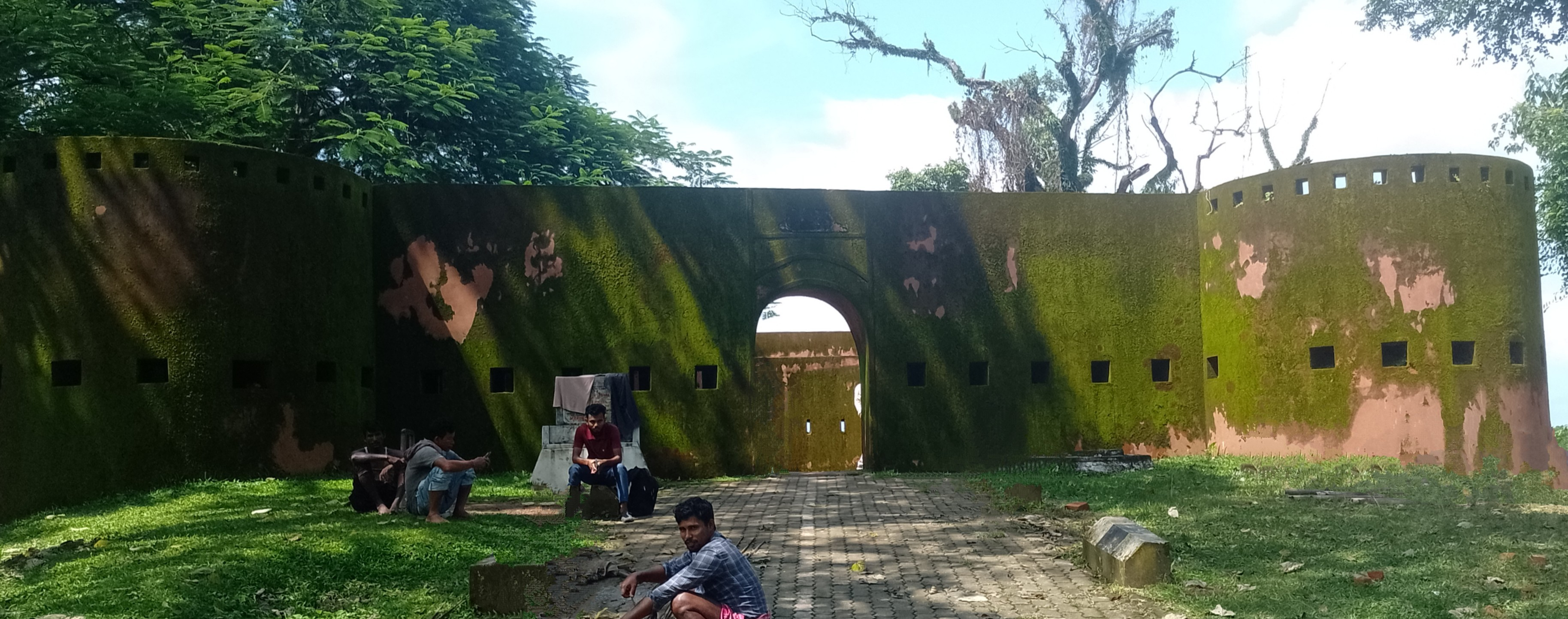
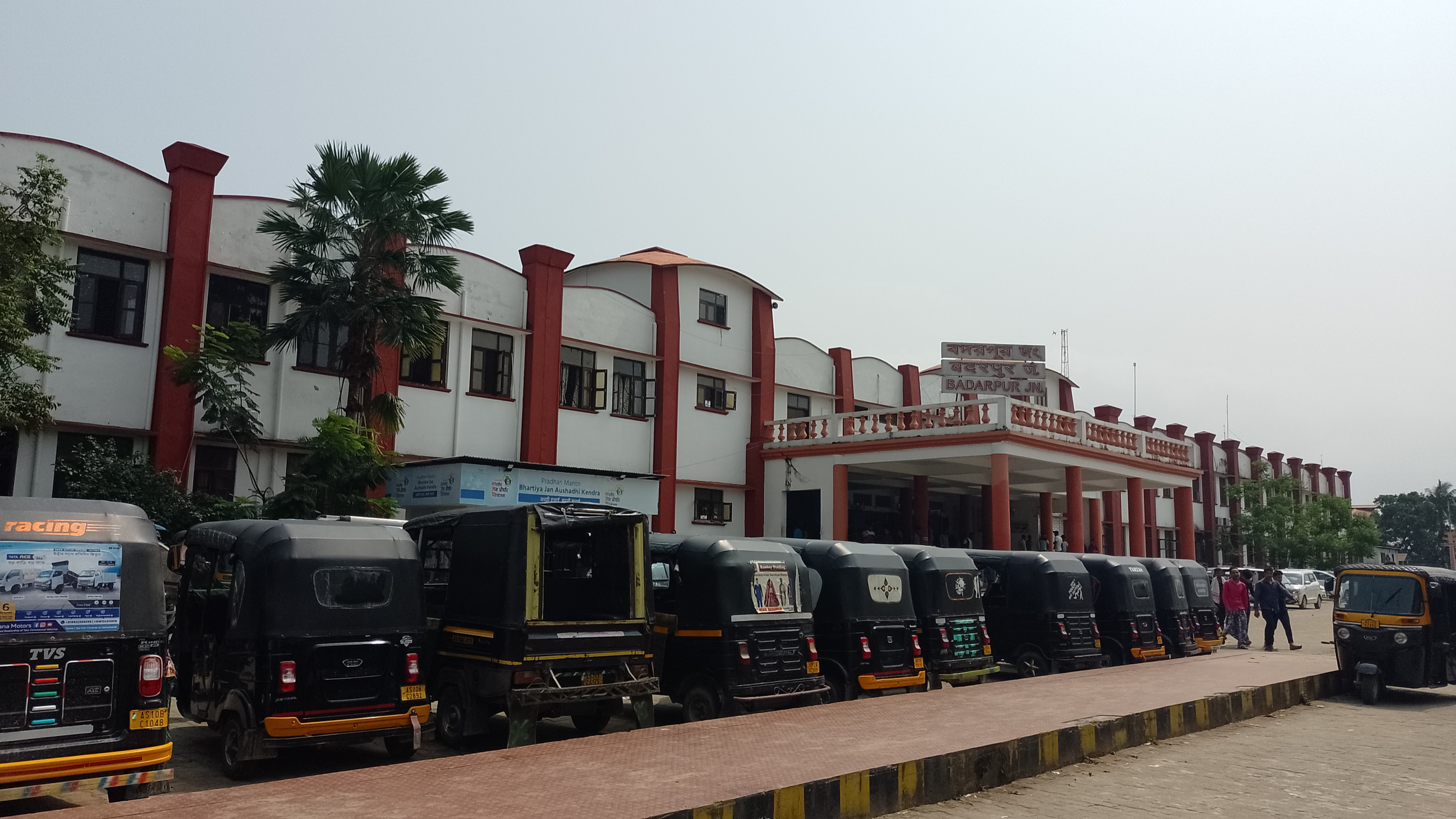
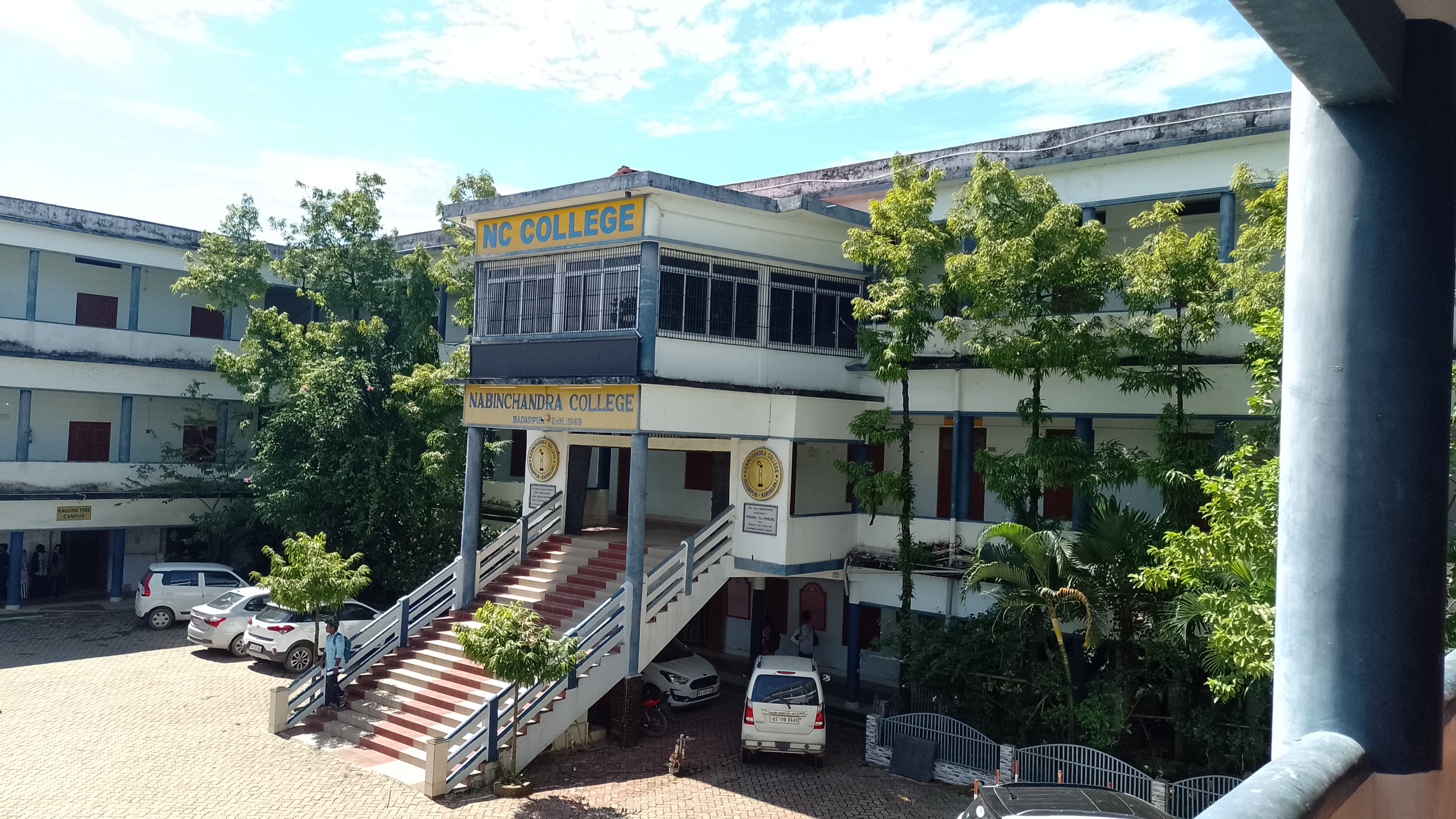
- From Top to Bottom: Badarpur fort, Badarpur Railway Station, Nabinchandra College, Badarpur
- Nickname: Gateway of Barak valley
- Location in Assam, India Badarpur (India)
- Coordinates: 24.9°N 92.6°E
- Country: India
- State: Assam
- District: Cachar
- Founder: Hazrat Shah Badaruddin
- Named for: Hazrat Shah Badaruddin

Government
  - Type: Municipal board
  - Body: Badarpur Municipal Board
- Elevation: 16 m (52 ft)

Population (2011)
  - Total: 33,400
- Demonym: Badarpuri (Bodorpuri/Bodorfuri)

Languages
  - Official: Bengali and Meitei (Manipuri)
- Time zone: UTC+5:30 (IST)
- ISO 3166 code: IN-AS
- Vehicle registration: AS-10
- Website: badarpur.assamurban.in

Badarpur (Bengali pronunciation: [bɔdorpur]), is a town and a municipal board in Cachar district in the state of Assam, India. Badarpur. Together with adjacent Badarpur Railway Town, it forms the Badarpur Urban Area, one of two notified urban areas in the district. The area is also popularly known as "Gateway to the Barak Valley" of Assam. Badarpur was a part of Karimganj district until 31 December 2022.

== History ==
After the Conquest of Sylhet in 1303, a disciple of Shah Jalal known as Adam Khaki migrated and settled in present-day Deorail, Badarpur. Along with him Syed Shah Badaruddin settled in Bundashil area of present day . Badarpur is also popular in the valley because of its geographical point of view. Nowadays it has become the centre for various educational institutions including higher education like B.pharm, D.pharm etc. at Allama TR college of Pharmacy which is located at Hasanpur, Srigauri Hospital Road. Nabin Chandra College is the most reputed educational institute at Badarpur.

The railway junction under the Northeast Frontier Railway, the Badarpur Junction is the first railway station in the valley. It was first enacted and introduced by the then British Government under metre gauge rail lines from Badarpur to Lumding in 1898.

== Geography ==
Badarpur is located at 24.9°N 92.6°E. It has an average elevation of 16 metres (52 feet). Badarpur is surrounded by river Barak on the north, Barail hill range in the east and southeast and villages and paddy field in the west

== Demographics ==
Bengali and Meitei (Manipuri) are the official languages of this place. The majority of the inhabitants of Badarpur speak Sylheti, which is considered either a distinct language or a dialect of Bengali.

As of 2011 India census, Badarpur had a population of around 33,400 consisting of Town Committee, Railway Township and Chapra Census Town. Males constitute 52% of the population and females 48%. Badarpur has an average literacy rate of 84%, higher than the national average of 79.5%. 10% of the population is under 6 years of age.

=== Religion ===
Hinduism is the dominant religion in Badarpur followed by Islam and Christianity.

Religion in Badarpur (2011)
1. Hinduism (62.8%)
2. Islam (35.6%)
3. Christianity (0.91%)
4. Blue (0.68%)

== Politics ==
Badarpur is part of Silchar (Lok Sabha constituency). At present the MLA of Badarpur is Abdul Aziz.

== Tourism ==
Badarpur Fort .

== Notable people ==
- Abdul Jalil Choudhury, Indian Deobandi Islamic scholar, teacher and politician

== Citations ==
- Mahanta, Sakuntala; Gope, Amalesh (2018). "Tonal polarity in Sylheti in the context of noun faithfulness". Language Sciences. 69: 80–97. doi:10.1016/j.langsci.2018.06.010. S2CID 149759441.
