= Saifia =

Sufi sect of Islam

Saifia, (Arabic: سيفية) (Urdu: سیفیہ) also spelled as Saifiya or Saifiyya, is a Sunni Sufi order based in Pakistan, with a following in the United Kingdom, Europe, the United States, Canada, Fiji, India, Bangladesh, Norway, and various other countries around the world.

The order follows the Hanafi school of thought (Madhhab), the Maturidi creed (Aqidah), the Naqshbandi Sufi tradition (Tariqa), and the order's founder is Akhundzada Saif-ur-Rahman Mubarak.

== The Saifia chain of succession ==
The following is the chain of succession of authority (Silsila) of the Saifia order.

#	Name	Buried	Birth	Death
1	Prophet Muhammad	Medina, Saudi Arabia	Mon 12 Rabi al-Awwal (570/571 CE)	2/9 Rabi al-Awwal 11 AH (5/6 June 632 CE)
2	Amir al-Mu'minin Abu Bakr al-Siddiq	Medina, Saudi Arabia	(573 C.E)	22 Jumada al-Thani 13 AH (22 August 634 C.E)
3	Salman Farsi	Mada’in, Iraq	(568 C.E.)	10 Rajab 33 AH (4/5 February 654 C.E)
4	Imam Qasim ibn Muhammad ibn Abi Bakr	Medina, Saudi Arabia	23 Shaban 24 AH (22/23 June 645 C.E)	24 Jumada al-Thani 101/106/107 AH
5	Imam Jafar al-Sadiq	Medina, Saudi Arabia	8 Ramadan 80 AH (5/6 November 699 C.E)	15 Rajab 148 AH (6/7 September 765 C.E)
6	Khwaja Bayazid Bastami	Bistam, Semnan province, Iran	186 AH (804 C.E)	15 Shaban 261 AH (24/25 May 875 C.E)
7	Khwaja Abul-Hassan Kharaqani	Kharaqan, near Bistam, Semnan province, Iran	352 AH (963 C.E)	10 Muharram 425 AH (5/6 December 1033 C.E)
8	Khwaja Abu al-Qasim Gurgani	Gorgan, Golestan, Iran	380 AH (990 C.E)	450 AH (1058 C.E)
9	Khwaja Abu ali Farmadi	Toos, Khurasan, Iran	434 AH (1042/1043 C.E)	4 Rabi al-Awwal 477 or 511 AH (10 July 1084 / 6 July 1117)
10	Khwaja Abu Yaqub Yusuf Hamadānī	Marv, near Mary, Turkmenistan	440 AH (1048/1049 C.E)	Rajab 535 AH (Feb/Mar 1141 C.E)
11	Khwaja Abdul Khaliq Ghujdawani	Ghajdawan, Bukhara, Uzbekistan	22 Shaban 435 AH (24/25 March 1044 C.E)	12 Rabi al-Awwal 575 AH (17/18 August 1179 C.E)
12	Khwaja Arif Reogari	Reogar, near Bukhara, Uzbekistan	27 Rajab 551 AH (15 September 1156 C.E)	1 Shawwal 616 AH (10/11 December 1219 C.E.)
13	Khwaja Mahmood Anjir-Faghnawi	Bukhara, Uzbekistan	18 Shawwal 628 AH (18/19 August 1231 C.E)	17 Rabi al-Awwal 717 AH (29/30 May 1317 C.E)
14	Khwaja Azizan Ali Ramitani	Khwarazm, Uzbekistan	591 AH (1194 C.E)	27 Ramadan 715 or 721 AH (25/26 December 1315 or 20/21 October 1321)
15	Khwaja Muhammad Baba Samasi	Samaas, Bukhara, Uzbekistan	25 Rajab 591 AH (5/6 July 1195 C.E)	10 Jumada al-Thani 755 AH (2/3 July 1354 C.E)
16	Khwaja Sayyid Amir Kulal	Saukhaar, Bukhara, Uzbekistan	676 AH (1277/1278 C.E)	Wed 2 Jumada al-Thani 772 AH (21/22 December 1370 C.E)
17	Khwaja Muhammad Baha'uddin Naqshband Bukhari	Qasr-e-Aarifan, Bukhara, Uzbekistan	4 Muharram 718 AH (8/9 March 1318 C.E)	3 Rabi al-Awwal 791 AH (2/3 March 1389 C.E)
18	Khwaja Ala'uddin Attar	Jafaaniyan, Transoxiana (Uzbekistan)	N/A	Wed 20 Rajab 804 AH (23 February 1402 C.E)
19	Khwaja Yaqub Charkhi	Gulistan, Dushanbe, Tajikistan	762 AH (1360/1361 C.E)	5 Safar 851 AH (21/22 April 1447 C.E)
20	Khwaja Ubaidullah Ahrar	Samarkand, Uzbekistan	Ramadan 806 AH (March/April 1404 C.E)	29 Rabi al-Awwal 895 AH (19/20 February 1490 C.E)
21	Khwaja Muhammad Zahid Wakhshi	Wakhsh	14 Shawwal 852 AH (11/12 December 1448 C.E)	1 Rabi al-Awwal 936 AH (3/4 November 1529 C.E)
22	Khwaja Darwish Muhammad	Asqarar, Uzbekistan	16 Shawwal 846 AH (17/18 February 1443 C.E)	19 Muharram 970 AH (18/19 September 1562 C.E)
23	Khwaja Muhammad Amkanagi	Amkana, Bukhara, Uzbekistan	918 AH (1512/1513 C.E)	22 Shaban 1008 AH (8/9 March 1600 C.E)
24	Khwaja Muhammad Baqi Billah Berang	Delhi, India	5 Dhu al-Hijjah 971 or 972 AH (14 July 1564 / 3 July 1565)	25 Jumada al-Thani 1012 AH (29/30 November 1603 C.E)
25	Imam Rabbani Ahmad al-Fārūqī al-Sirhindī	Sirhind, India	14 Shawwal 971 AH (25/26 May 1564 C.E)	28 Safar 1034 AH (9/10 December 1624 C.E)
26	Imam Khwaja Masum al-Fārūqī	Sirhind, India	1007 AH (1598/1599 C.E)	9 Rabi al-Awwal 1099 AH (13/14 January 1688 C.E)
27	Khwaja Muhammad Sibghatullah al-Fārūqī	Sirhind, India	1033 AH (1624/1710 C.E)	9 Rabi us sani 1122 AH (June 1710 C.E)
28	Khwaja Muhammad Ismail	Sirhind, India	N/A	1136AH ( 1724 C.E)
29	Khwaja Masum al-Fārūqī II	Sirhind, India	(2/3 March 1700 C.E)	5 Dhu al-Hijjah 1161 AH
30	Shah Ghulam Muhammad	Sirhind, India	1101 AH (1690 C.E)	1 Shawal 1175 AH (24 April 1762 C.E)
31	Hajji Muhammad Safi	Hadida, Yamen	4 Dhul-Qa`dah 1156 AH (1744 C.E)	6 Dhu al-Qidah 1212 AH (21 April 1798 C.E)
32	Shah Zia al-Haq	Nijrab, Afghanistan	1101 AH (1690 C.E)	10 Muharram 1225 AH (24 April 1762 C.E)
33	Shams al-Haq	Gulbahar, Pakistan	1101 AH (1690 C.E)	22 Rabi' al-awwal 1350 AH (24 April 1762 C.E)
34	Shah Rasul Thaqalayni	Taloqan, Afghanistan	N/A	1360 AH ( 1942 C.E)
35	Mawlana Muhammad Hashim Samangani'	Pir Sabaq, Pakistan	1349 AH (1930 C.E)	9 Shawal 1391 AH (27 November 1762 C.E)
36	Mawlana Akhundzada Saif-ur-Rahman Mubarak	Lahore, Pakistan	20 Muharram 1344 AH (10 August 1925 C.E)	15 Rajab 1431 AH (27 June 2010 C.E)

== See also ==
- List of tariqa
- Akhundzada Saif-ur-Rahman Mubarak
- Naqshbandi
