= Adam Khaki =

14th-century South Asian Sufi figure

Personal life
- Died: Deorail, Badarpur, Karimganj
- Resting place: Deorail, Badarpur, Karimganj
- Other name: Shah Adom Khaki

Religious life
- Religion: Islam

Muslim leader
- Post: Companion of Shah Jalal
- Period in office: Early 14th century

Ādam Khākī (Bengali: আদম খাকী, romanized: Adom Khākī, Arabic: آدم خاكي), also known as Khaki Pir, was a 14th-century Sufi Muslim figure in the Sylhet region. In 1303, he took part in the final battle of the Conquest of Sylhet led by Shah Jalal. His shrine has become a popular tourist site.

== Legacy ==
It is unclear how and what year he died, but he was buried in a dargah in Badarpur, Karimganj, near the modern-day Badarpur railway station. A mosque was built within the complex, and it became a notable site in Badarpur attracting Muslims and Hindus alike. Those attached to the maqam of Adam Khaki were given Pirmuttara land grants. by Ariyan Choudhury
