= Pir Sabaq =

Pir Sabak sharif
- Pir Sabaq sharif
- Location within Pakistan
- Coordinates: 34°01′36″N 72°02′25″E
- Country: Pakistan
- Province: Khyber-Pakhtunkhwa
- District: Nowshera District
- Time zone: UTC+5 (PST)

Pir Sabaq Sharif or Pir Sabak Sharif is a village in Nowshera District of the Khyber Pakhtunkhwa province in Pakistan. The inhabitants of this village are Muslims. The language spoken in the village is Pashto, and famous for most highly religious Sufi Hazarat Pir Sabaq Baba Jee سلطان الاولیاء حضرت عبد السلام ورحمتہ اللہ وبرکاتہ

== Overview and history ==
Historical Pir Sabaq Sharif, is a village near the city of Nowshera in the Khyber Pakhtunkhwa of Pakistan. It is 7 km away from Nowshera City.

== Location ==
Pir Sabaq is the largest village with respect to both area and population in the region. The village lies just at the banks of Kabul River.

== Religion ==
The entire population of Pir Sabaq are Sunni Muslims. Before the Pakistan-India partition there were several Hindu families residing in the village but most of them left for India after independence. Some Hindu families became Muslims.

== Borders and Population ==
Pir Sabaq is one of the most densely populated villages in District Nowshera. It is a business hub as it is surrounded by several villages, and mostly the nearby villagers come for business, employment, and trading in Pir Sabaq. Some of the main villages located around Pir Sabaq are Zara Miana, Raj Muhammad Kalli, Misri Banda, and Pir Sabaq Dheri.
