= History of Sufism =

Aspect of Islamic history

Sufism is the mystical branch of Islam in which Muslims seek divine love and truth through direct personal experience of God. This mystic tradition within Islam developed in several stages of growth, emerging first in the form of early asceticism, based on the teachings of Hasan al-Basri, before entering the second stage of more classical mysticism of divine love, as promoted by al-Ghazali and Attar of Nishapur, and finally emerging in the institutionalised form of today's network of fraternal Sufi orders, based on Sufis such as Rumi and Yunus Emre. At its core, however, Sufism remains an individual mystic experience. A Sufi can be characterized as one who seeks fana' (annihilation of the ego in God, dissolving individual ego-consciousness) followed by baqa' (subsistence in God, returning to ordinary human existence where one's life, character, and actions are entirely sustained by and aligned with the Divine). Both occur without ontological union or indwelling; the union Sufis actually speak of—despite any ecstatic language suggesting otherwise—is strictly one of love, will, and conscious accord. This state is illustrated by many scriptural sections such as Sahih al-Bukhari 6502 (a Hadith Qudsi where God describes the culmination of this closeness):

He who bears enmity toward a Friend of Mine (Saint), I have indeed proclaimed war against him. My servant draws not near to Me with anything more beloved to My heart than what I have made obligatory upon him. Yet my servant continues to draw closer to Me through devotion in the supererogatory until I love him. And when I love him, I become the hearing through which he listens, the sight through which he sees, the hand with which he strikes, and the foot upon which he walks.

== Early history ==
The exact origin of Sufism is disputed. Some sources state that Sufism is the inner dimensions of the teachings of Muhammad whereas others say that Sufism emerged during the Islamic Golden Age from about the eighth to tenth centuries. According to Ibn Khaldun Sufism was already practised by the Sahaba, but with the spread of material tendencies, the term Sufi was just applied to those who emphasize the spiritual practice of Islam.

=== Origins ===
Abu Bakr Muhammad Zakaria states in his book "Hindusiyat wa Tasur" that Kamel Amiel al-Shaibi and Abdullah Waris Bin Ishaq in separate texts say that the first person to use the word Sufi was Abu Hashem al-Kufi (2nd century AH), and Ibn Taymiyya said in his Majmual Fatwa that Basra was a center of Sufism at that time.

Ahmet Karamustafa describes renunciation (زُهد zuhd) as a widespread form of piety in Muslim communities in the first century of Abbasid rule. Ibrahim ibn Adham al-Balkhi (d. 777-8) took on an ascetic lifestyle with a "radical aversion" to mainstream social life. The followers of the preacher Hasan al-Basri founded a ribat on Abadan Island on the Tigris near Basra. Karamustafa also cites Rābiʿa al-ʿAdawiyya, Shaqiq al-Balkhi, Al-Darani, Dhul-Nun al-Misri, Yahya ibn Mu'adh al-Razi, and Bayazid Bastami as some of the pioneering figures in the introspective trends that would lead to what would later be called Sufism.

Orientalists proposed a variety of origin theories regarding Sufism, such as that it originated as an Indo-European response to Semitic influence, Buddhism, Neo-Platonism, and Christian ascetism or Gnosticism. Modern academics and scholars however, have rejected early Orientalist theories asserting a non-Islamic origin of Sufism, Carl Ernst states that the tendency to try and disassociate Islam from Sufism was an attempt by Orientalists to create a divide between what they found attractive within Islamic civilization (i.e. Islamic spirituality) and the negative stereotypes of Islam that were present in Britain. Hosein Nasr states that non-Islamic origin theories are false according to the point of view of Sufism. Many have asserted Sufism to be unique within the confines of the Islamic religion, and contend that Sufism developed from people like Bayazid Bastami, who, in his utmost reverence to the sunnah, refused to eat a watermelon because he did not find any proof that Muhammad ever ate it. According to William Chittick, Sufism can simply be described as "the interiorization, and intensification of Islamic faith and practice."

=== Sufis of Baghdad ===
A distinct practice of piety associated with introspection, drawing from different practices and ideas, took form in Baghdad in the second half of the 9th century. Members of the first generation of Sufis in Baghdad included Harith al-Muhasibi, Abu Hamza al-Baghdadi, Abu Sa'id al-Kharraz, Abu al-Husain al-Nuri, Junayd al-Baghdadi, Ruwaym, and Khayr an-Nassaj. A following generation included Abu Bakr al-Shibli, Al-Jurayri, Rudbari, and Ja'far al-Khuldi.

=== Codification of doctrine ===
Towards the end of the 1st millennium CE, a number of manuals began to be written summarizing the doctrines of Sufism and describing some typical Sufi practices. Two of the most notable are Kashf al-Mahjûb (Revelation of the Veiled) of Hujwiri, and Al-Risala al-Qushayriyya (The Message) of Al-Qushayri. According to the late medieval mystic Jami, Abd-Allah ibn Muhammad ibn al-Hanafiyyah (died c. 716) was the first person to be called a "Sufi".

Two of al Ghazali's finest treatises, the "Revival of Religious Sciences" and the "Alchemy of Happiness," depicted Sufism as the complete fulfilment of Islamic Law. This became the mainstream position among Islamic scholars for centuries, challenged only recently on the basis of Orientalism and Wahhabism.

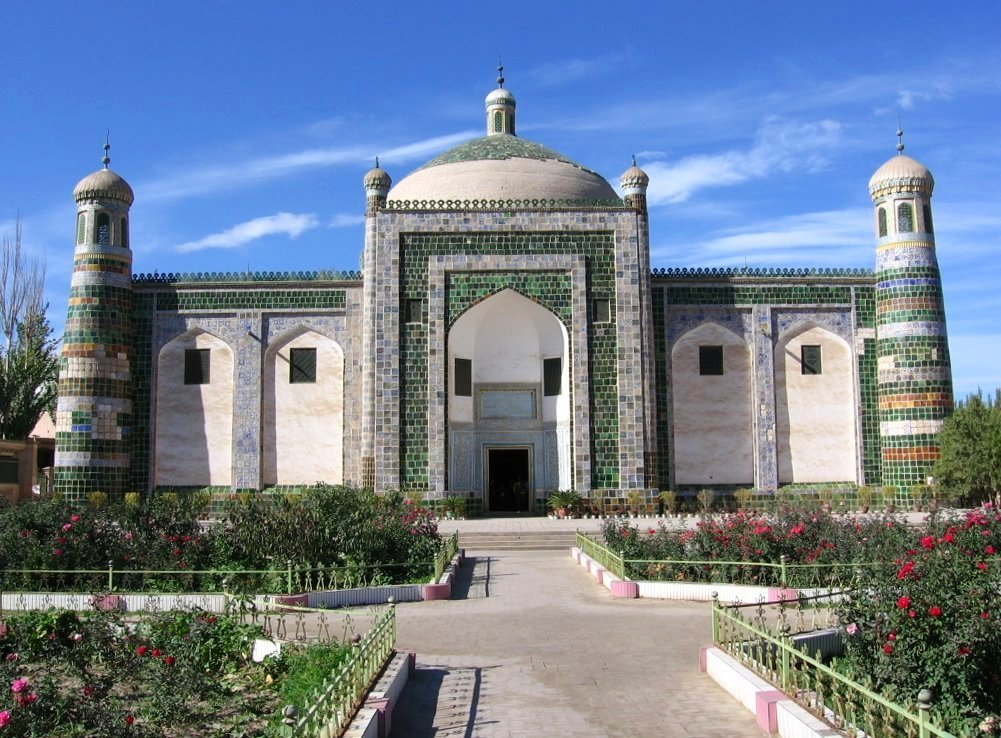
The tomb of Khoja Afāq, near Kashgar, China.

All Sufi orders claim a direct chain of leadership to Muhammad, through Ali, with the exception of the Naqshbandis who claim a direct connection to Muhammad through Abu Bakr. In the eleventh century, Sufi orders (Tariqa) were instrumental in the institutional spread of Sufism.

=== Muslim Spain ===
Beginning in the ninth century and continuing throughout the tenth century, al-Andalus was home to fairly strict, orthodox beliefs and practices. Quranic studies and jurisprudence (fiqh) were the accepted and promoted types of scholarship that shaped the region's beliefs and practices. Early fuqaha in Spain were somewhat skeptical of philosophical thought as well as of Sufism. In later centuries, especially the twelfth and thirteenth, Sufism became more accepted and somewhat assimilated into Andalusi Islam. Scholars have generally seen this later flourishing in two different ways. For some, it reflects the influence of the mystical tradition in Cordoba attributed to Ibn Masarra. Others give exclusive credit to the influence of eastern mystics, most often including al-Ghazali's thoughts and teachings.

One figure in particular has often been credited as being the earliest introduction of Sufism to Spain: Ibn Masarra. He lived from 883 to 931 and was born outside of Cordoba. Many consider him to have established the first Sufi school in the province; however, his teachings were outside of the so-called "mainstream" Sufism that was more common in the East during his lifetime.

With Ibn Masarra there was a “brief flowering” of Sufism in Spain, and later Spanish Sufis reflected his influence on them. After Ibn Masarra's death, in 940 his followers fell under heavy persecution by the jurists who destroyed Ibn Masarra's works and also forced his followers to recant. The effects of his thought and that of his disciples would appear again in the twelfth and thirteenth centuries amidst later Sufis such as Ibn Arabi.

By the twelfth century, shifts towards the acceptance—or at least tolerance—of philosophy and Sufism into what had previously been strictly orthodox beliefs were occurring. Many people began to read and translate the works of philosophers such as Aristotle and Plato. At the forefront of the philosophical movement in Spain were Ibn Bajjah, Ibn Tufail, Ibn Rushd, and a Jewish scholar named Ibn Maimun. Ibn Tufail introduced the element of Sufism into this philosophical way of thinking. Andalusi Sufism was at its peak at this time. Also at this time, eastern Sufism was developing more as a communal movement, whereas that of the West (including in al-Andalus), it remained largely an individual pursuit.

A group of Sufi masters who defended the works of theosophists such as Ghazali and al-Qushayri began emerging in the late eleventh and early- to mid-twelfth centuries. Abu l-‘Abbas ibn al-‘Arif (1088-1141) was one of the most prominent Sufis in Spain and one of the earliest ones during Sufism's peak in the peninsula. He belonged to what Spanish scholar of Islam, Miguel Asin Palacios, termed the "School of Almeria," so named for its geographical location.

Ibn al-Arif was one of the first to interpret Ghazali in the West, and he also founded a method of spiritual training called tariqah. Ibn al-‘Arif's disciple Ibn Qasi set up a group of religious followers in Portugal and built a monastery in Silves. He authored the Khal al-Na’lain, which Ibn ‘Arabi would later write a commentary on. Ibn Barrajan (d. 1141), who a student and friend of Ibn al-‘Arif, lived and taught in Seville but was originally from North Africa, has been called the Ghazali of the West. Ibn Barrajan and Ibn al-‘Arif were both tried for heresy because their views conflicted with those of the Almoravids in power; however, Ibn Barrajan appears to have been more active in using Sufism as a means of challenging Quranic scholars and jurists.

Ibn Arabi, another key figure of this period of Sufism in the region, was born in Murcia in 1165 at the beginning of the Almohad reign. He is one of the most important Sufis of Spain, although he--like many other Andalusi Sufis--would eventually leave the peninsula and travel throughout North Africa and the East. His works in Andalusia focused mainly on the perfect human individual, monastic metaphysics, and mystical path to spiritual and intellectual perfection. Central themes of Ibn 'Arabi's were the unity of all beings, or “wahdat al-wujud,” and also how God reflects God's self in the world. According to Ibn ‘Arabi, the main practices of Andalusi Sufis included ascesis, poverty, and devotion to the Qur’an.

Not long after the death of Ibn ‘Arabi, al-Andalus experienced a “spiritual aridity” in the mid-fourteenth century. The one exception to that trend was Ibn Abbad al-Rundi (1332-1390), a member of the Shadhiliyya order who was born in Ronda and whose scholarship brought together mystical and juridical paths. His work helped Sufism become more accepted within the Islamic sciences.

Although Sufism would no longer directly be a part of Andalusi life after the Catholic Monarchs reconquered all Spain, some have seen Sufism's lasting influence in Spain.

=== Medieval Age and Turko-Mongol period ===
In the medieval period, Islam and Sufism were practically synonyms and a distinction between Sufism and Islamic orthodoxy virtually absent. The heterodoxy of mysticism, in contrast to formal theology, enabled Islam to survive during the Turko-Mongol period in the thirteenth-Century. Under Turko-Mongolian rulership, Sufi authors and teachings such as those of Ahmad Yasawi, Abu al-Najib Suhrawardi, Rumi and Sultan Walad, a leading interpreter of the ibn Arabi, flourished throughout the Islamic world. During this period, Sufism became focused on the purification of the soul to achieve the status of the "perfect human" (al-Insān al-Kāmil).

Authors such as Ahmad Yasawi and Yunus Emre spread Sufism and Perso-Arabic ideas through Anatolia and Central Asia. The idea of syncretism between Turko Shamanic religion and Islam, upheld by many earlier scholars has been challenged in recent scholarship. There is, arguably, a lack of similarities between Shamanism and Anatolian Sufism, as well as a lack of unified orthodoxy of Islam and Sufism during this period.

== 13th to 16th centuries ==
Between the 13th and 16th centuries CE, Sufism produced a flourishing intellectual culture throughout the Islamic world, a "Golden Age" whose physical artifacts are still present. In many places, a lodge (known variously as a zawiya, khanqah, or takya) would be endowed through a pious foundation in perpetuity (waqf) to provide a gathering place for Sufi adepts, as well as lodging for itinerant seekers of knowledge. The same system of endowments could also be used to pay for a complex of buildings, such as that surrounding the Süleymaniye Mosque in Istanbul, including a lodge for Sufi seekers, a hospice with kitchens where these seekers could serve the poor and/or complete a period of initiation, a library, and other structures. No important domain in the civilization of Islam remained unaffected by Sufism in this period.

Sufism was an important factor in the historical spread of Islam, and in the creation of regional Islamic cultures, especially in Africa and Asia. Recent academic work on these topics has focused on the role of Sufism in creating and propagating the culture of the Ottoman world, including a study of the various branches of the Naqshbandi and Khalwati orders, and in resisting European imperialism in North Africa and South Asia.

=== Spread to India ===
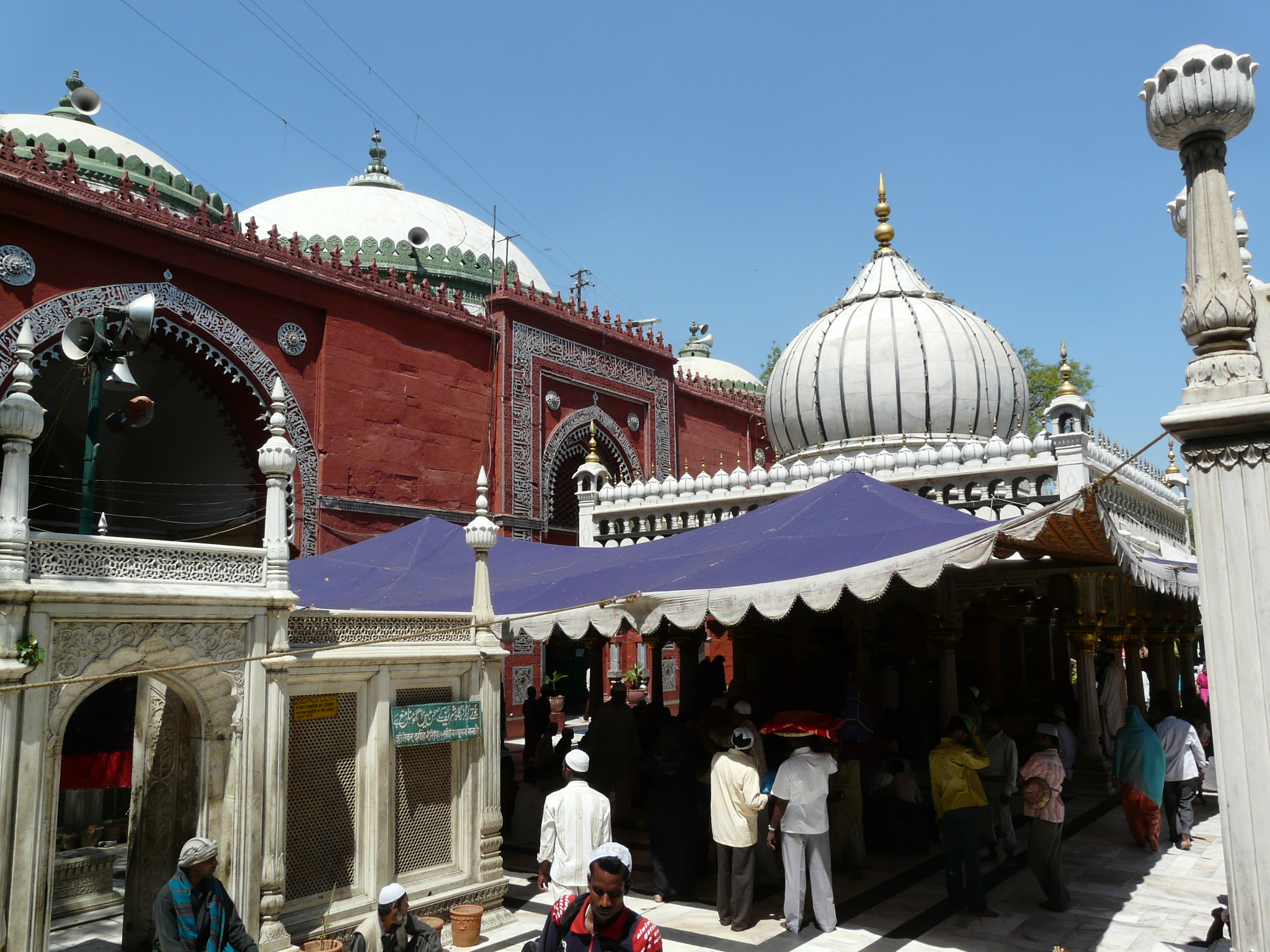
Nizamuddin Auliya's tomb (right) and Jama'at Khana Masjid (background), at Nizamuddin Dargah complex, in Nizamuddin West, Delhi

Muslims of South Asia prominently follow the Chishtiyya, Naqshbandiyyah, Qadiriyyah and Suhrawardiyyah orders. Of them the Chishti order is the most visible. Khwaja Moinuddin Chishti, a disciple of Khwaja Usman Harooni, the propounder of this order, introduced it in India. He came to India from Afghanistan with the army of Shihab-ud-Din Ghuri in 1192 AD and started living permanently in Ajmer from 1195. Centuries later, with the support of Mughal rulers, his shrine became a place of pilgrimage. Akbar used to visit the shrine every year.

Turkic conquests in South Asia were accompanied by four Sufi mystics of the Chishtiyya order from Afghanistan: Moinuddin (d. 1233 in Ajmer), Qutbuddin (d. 1236 in Delhi), Nizamuddin (d.1335 in Delhi) and Fariduddin (d.1265 in Pakpattan now in Pakistan). During the reign of Muhammad bin Tughluq, who spread the Delhi Sultanate towards the south, the Chistiyya spread its roots all across India. The Sufi shine at Ajmer in Rajasthan and Nizamuddin Auliya in Delhi, Ashraf Jahangir Semnani in Kichaucha Shariff belong to this order.

The Suharawardi order was started by Abu al-Najib Suhrawardi, a Persian Sufi born in Sohrevard near Zanjan in Iran, and brought to India by Baha-ud-din Zakariya of Multan. The Suhrawardiyyah order of Sufism gained popularity in Bengal. In addition, the Suhrawardiyyah order, under the leadership of Abu Hafs Umar al-Suhrawardi (d. 1234), also bequeathed a number of teachings and institutions that were influential in shaping other order that emerged during later periods.

The Khalwati order was founded by Umar al-Khalwati, an Azerbaijani Sufi known for undertaking long solitary retreats in the wilderness of Azerbaijan and northwestern Iran. While the Indian subcontinent branches of the order did not survive into modern times, the order later spread into the Ottoman Empire and became influential there after it came under persecution by the rise of the Safavid Shahs during the sixteenth century.

The Qadiriyyah order was founded by Abdul Qadir Gilani, whose tomb is at Baghdad. It is popular among the Muslims of South India. Baha-ud-Din Naqshband (1318-1389) of Turkestan founded the Naqshbandi Sufi order. Khwaja Baqi Billah, whose tomb is in Delhi, spread the Naqshbandi order to India. The essence of this order was insistence on rigid adherence to Sharia and nurturing love for Muhammad. It was patronized by the Mughal rulers, as its founder was their ancestral Pir (spiritual guide). "The conquest of India by Babur in 1526 gave considerable impetus to the Naqshbandiyya order". Its disciples remained loyal to the throne because of the common Turkic origin. With the royal patronage of most of the Mughal rulers, the Naqshbandi order caused the revival of Islam in its pure form. Sufi orders were sometimes close to the ruling powers such as the Ottoman Empire, helping their spread and influence.

== Modern history ==
Current Sufi orders include Ba 'Alawiyya, Chishti, Khalwati, Naqshbandi, Nimatullahi, Oveyssi, Qadria Noshahia, Qadiria Boutshishia, Qadiriyyah, Qalandariyya, Sarwari Qadiri, Shadhliyya, Tijaniyyah, and Suhrawardiyya.

Sufism is popular in such African countries as Morocco and Senegal, where it is seen as a mystical expression of Sunni Islam. Sufism is traditional in Morocco but has seen a growing revival with the renewal of Sufism around contemporary spiritual teachers such as Sidi Hamza al Qadiri al Boutshishi. Sufism suffered setbacks in North Africa during the colonial period; the life of the Algerian Sufi master Emir Abd al-Qadir is instructive in this regard. Notable as well are the lives of Amadou Bamba and Hajj Umar Tall in sub-Saharan Africa, and Sheikh Mansur Ushurma and Imam Shamil in the Caucasus region. In the 20th century some more modernist Muslims have called Sufism a superstitious religion that holds back Islamic achievement in the fields of science and technology. A number of western converts to Islam have also embraced Sufism, sometimes resulting in considerable syncretism or generic spiritualism detached from Islam, as in the case of "Universal Sufism" or the writings of René Guénon or G. I. Gurdjieff.

One of the first to return to Europe as an official representative of a Sufi order, and with the specific purpose to spread Sufism in Western Europe, was the Ivan Aguéli. Other noteworthy Sufi teachers who were active in the West include Bawa Muhaiyaddeen, Inayat Khan, Nazim Al-Haqqani, Javad Nurbakhsh, Bulent Rauf, Irina Tweedie, Idries Shah and Muzaffer Ozak. Currently active Sufi academics and publishers include Llewellyn Vaughan-Lee, Nuh Ha Mim Keller, Abdullah Nooruddeen Durkee, Abdal Hakim Murad, Syed Waheed Ashraf and the Franco-Moroccan Faouzi Skali.

== See also ==
- Ashraf Jahangir Semnani
- Moinuddin Chishti
- Nizamuddin Awliya
