= Tazkirat al-Awliya =

Persian biographical book by Farīd al-Dīn 'Aṭṭar

Tazkirat al-Awliyā (Persian: تذکرةالاولیا or تذکرةالاولیاء, lit. "Biographies of the Saints") – variant transliterations: Tadhkirat al-Awliya, Tazkerat-ol-Owliya, Tezkereh-i-Evliā etc. – is a hagiographic collection of ninety-six Sufi saints (wali, plural awliya) and their miracles (karamat) authored by the Sufi Iranian poet and mystic Farīd al-Dīn ‘Aṭṭar of Nishapur who lived from 1145 to 1221.

Aṭṭar's only surviving prose work comprises 72 chapters, beginning with the life of Jafar al-Sadiq and ending with the Sufi martyr, Mansur Al-Hallaj's. Included in the list are four eponymous Sunni madhab founders, namely Sufyan al-Thawri, Abu Hanifah, Al-Shafi'i and Ahmad ibn Hanbal.

== Translations ==
- Muslim Saints and Mystics: Episodes from the Tadhkirat Al-Auliya‘ (1990); An abridged English translation by A.J. Arberry.
- Farid ad-Din ‘Attār’s Memorial of God's Friends: Lives and Sayings of Sufis (2009); Translated and introduced by Paul Losensky.
- Le Memorial des saints (1889); A French translation by Pavet de Courteille.

== List of biographies ==
- Jafar Sadiq
- Uwais al-Qarni
- Hasan Basri
- Malik Dinar
- Muhammad Ibn Wasi' Al-Azdi
- Habib Ajami
- Abu Hazim Makki
- Atabah Ibn Qolam
- Rabia al-Adawiyya
- Ibrahim ibn Adham
- Bishr Hafi
- Dhul-Nun al-Misri
- Bayazid Bastami
- Abd Allah ibn al-Mubarak
- Sufyan al-Thawri
- Sari al-Saqati
- Shaqiq al-Balkhi
- Abu Hanifah
- Al-Shafi'i
- Ahmad ibn Hanbal
- Dawud Tai
- Harith al-Muhasibi
- Abu Soleiman Darayi
- Muhammad Ibn Sammak
- Muhammad Aslam Al-Tusi
- Ahmad ibn Harb
- Hatam Asam
- Sahl al-Tustari
- Maruf Karkhi
- Fath Museli
- Ahmad Hevari
- Ahmad Khezruyah
- Abutorab Nokhshabi
- Yahya ibn Ma'az
- Shah Shoja Kermani
- Yusef Ibn Al-Huseyn
- Abu Hafs Haddad
- Abu Muhammad Jariri
- Mansur Al-Hallaj

== See also ==
- Persian literature
- Al-Majdi fi Ansab al-Talibiyyin
