= Islam and poverty =

Peaking whilst in the Middle Ages, the religion of Islam has a tenuous relationship with the idea of voluntary poverty. While Sufism has encouraged the renunciation of material wealth, Sunni and Shi'ite scholars have traditionally held that self-denial is inconsistent with the Quran's admonition against those who would forbid the good that God has put in this world for his people to enjoy.

Some scholars have suggested that Islam began with the message of "sharing with the poor and...the necessity of sacrificing worldly possessions", but following the Hijra flight from Mecca, morphed into a political character extolling conquest.

As scholars began to venerate those who abandoned material wealth in order to pursue full-time worship of God, the idealization of poverty grew to such a point that it began to colour Islamic ideas about the nature of poverty.

== Early Muslims ==
Muhammad's wife Aisha was noted to have adopted voluntary poverty. Some traditions relate her actions to a hadith which claims Muhammad told her "A'isha if you want to be joined with me, take of this world as little as a rider's provisions, beware of associating with the rich, and do not deem a garment worn out until you have patched it". Likewise, his wife Zaynab bint Jahsh was said to have viewed wealth as fitna, a temptation, and gave away all her possessions and took Umar's 12,000 Dirham annual money given to her, and distributed it among the poor.

The first two successors to Muhammad, Abu Bakr and Umar, were noted for their voluntary poverty. Abu Bakr was a rich merchant but after he became the companion of Muhammed he became poor because of the Quraish tribe's opposition. At the time of Abu Bakr's daughter marriage, Ayisha had only threadbare clothing which she mended herself. Umar was noted for wearing a frequently patched cloak, rather than a new one. When 'Umar arranged for 1,000 dinars to be sent, he is said to have wept because he had heard Muhammad say that the poor would enter Jannah 500 years before the rest of the Muslims.

There is a story that claims that a Muslim saw in a dream Malik Bin Deenar and Muhammad Ibn Wasi' being led into Jannah, and noticed that Malik was more honored and allowed to enter first. When he inquired, noting that he believed Ibn Wasi' was the nobler, he was told that it was true, "but Mohammed ibn Wasi possessed two shirts, and Malik only one. That is the reason why Malik is preferred".

== Sufi scholars ==
To have as few worldy goods as possible seemed the surest means of gaining salvation

— Reynold A. Nicholson, The Mystics of Islam, 1914.

Sufis referred to the voluntary abstinence of food as "the white death", the refusal to new clothes as "the green death" and the purposeful burdening of oneself with trouble as "the black death".

The saint Rabia al-Adawiyya was said to have spent her life preaching voluntary poverty and complete reliance upon Allah for all needs. Dawud al-Tai, a scholar of Sharia and Hadith who died in 777, was said to own nothing except a mat of bullrushes, a leather water vessel used for wudu and drinking, and a brick which he tucked beneath his head to sleep.

One apocryphal story claims that a novice and a Sheikh were walking in the woods, and the novice was carrying money. When they came to a dark valley with two roads, the novice asked the Sheikh which path should be taken, and was told "Throw away the [money], then you'll be free to take any road you wish". The story teaching that those who own material wealth are ruled by the fear of losing it.

The Sufi Ali Hujwiri wrote a prayer asking God to "first bestow on me goods that I may give thanks for them, and then help me to abstain from them for Your sake...that my poverty may be voluntary, not compulsory".

Dread the loss of poverty more than the rich man dreads the loss of wealth

— Dervish maxim.

al-Ghazzali's book "Revival of the Religious Sciences" (Ihya 'ulum al-din) contained a section entitled "The virtue of poverty", (Fadilat al-faqr) which contains a number of stories, such as Ibrahim Bin Adham sending away a sizable monetary donation, noting "I don't want to strike my name from the list of the poor for 60,000 dirhams".

Some Sufi ascetics rely solely on charity for their sustenance, and the Chishti sect forbids them to keep any gift for longer than a day without distributing it to the needy.
