= Sufi psychology =

Islamic and Sufi concept

There are four central ideas in Sufi Islamic psychology, which are the Nafs (self, ego or psyche), the Qalb (heart), the Ruh (spirit), and the 'Aql (intellect). The origin and basis of these terms is Qur'anic and they have been expounded upon by centuries of Sufic commentaries.

== Overview ==
Nafs is considered to be the lowest principle of man. Higher than the nafs are the Qalb (heart), and the Ruh (spirit). This tripartition forms the foundation of later, more complicated systems; it is found as early as the Koranic commentary by Ja'far al-Sadiq. He holds that the nafs is peculiar to the zalim (tyrant), the qalb to the muqtasid (moderate), and the rūh to the sābiq (preeminent one, winner); the zālim loves God for his own sake, the muqtasid loves Him for Himself, and the sābiq annihilates his own will in God's will. Bayezid Bistami, Hakīm at-Tirmidhī, and Junayd have followed this tripartition. Kharrāz, however, inserts between nafs and qalb the element tab', "nature," the natural functions of man. The spiritual body (soul) was created in adult form of the living body.

At almost the same time in history, Nūrī saw in man four different aspects of the heart, which he derived from the Quran:

Sadr (chest) is connected with Islam (Sūra 39:23); qalb (heart) is the seat of īmān (faith) (Sūra 49:7; 16:106); fuad (heart) is connected with marifa (gnosis) (Sūra 53:11); and lubb (innermost heart) is the seat of tauhīd (Sūra 3:190).

The Sufis often add the element of sirr, the innermost part of the heart in which the divine revelation is experienced. Jafar introduced, in an interesting comparison, reason, aql, as the barrier between nafs and qalb—"the barrier which they both cannot transcend" (Sūra 55:20), so that the dark lower instincts cannot jeopardize the heart's purity. Each of these spiritual centers has its own functions, and Amr al-Makkī has summed up some of the early Sufi ideas in a myth:

God created the hearts seven thousand years before the bodies and kept them in the station of proximity to Himself and He created the spirits seven thousand years before the hearts and kept them in the garden of intimate fellowship (uns) with Himself, and the consciences—the innermost part—He created seven thousand years before the spirits and kept them in the degree of union (waṣl) with Himself. Then he imprisoned the conscience in the spirit and the spirit in the heart and the heart in the body. Then He tested them and sent prophets, and then each began to seek its own station. The body occupied itself with prayer, the heart attained to love, the spirit arrived at proximity to its Lord, and the innermost part found rest in union with Him.

== Nafs ==
"Nafs" (self or ego) is the aspect of the psyche that can be viewed along a continuum, and has the potential of functioning from the grossest to the highest level. The self at its lowest level refers to our negative traits and tendencies, controlled by emotions, desires and its gratification. Sufic psychology identifies seven levels of the nafs, which have been identified in the Quran. The process of growth depends on working through these levels. These are: tyrannical self, regretful/self-accusing self, inspired self, serene self, pleased self, pleasing self and the pure self.

== Qalb ==
In Sufi psychology the heart refers to the spiritual heart or qalb, not the physical organ. It is this spiritual heart that contains the deeper intelligence and wisdom. It holds the Divine spark or spirit and is the place of gnosis and deep spiritual knowledge. In Sufism, the goal is to develop a heart that is sincere, loving and compassionate, and to develop the heart's intelligence, which is deeper, and more grounded than the rational, abstract intelligence of the mind. Just as the physical heart supplies blood to the body, the spiritual heart nourishes the soul with wisdom and spiritual light, and it also purifies the gross personality traits. According to Sufic psychology emotions are from the self or nafs, not from the heart. The qalb mediates between the Nafs and spirit. Its task is to control the nafs and direct the man toward the spirit.

== Ruh ==
The spirit ruh is in direct connection with the Divine, even if one is unconscious of that connection. The spirit has seven levels or facets of the complete spirit. These levels are: mineral, vegetable, animal, personal, human, secret and secret of secret souls. Each level represents the stages of evolution, and the process that it goes through in its growth. The spirit is holistic, and extends to all aspects of the person, i.e. the body, the mind and the soul. Each level of the spirit has valuable gifts and strengths, as well as weaknesses. The goal is to develop the strengths and to achieve a balance between these levels, not forgoing the lower ones to focus only on the higher ones. In traditional psychology, ego psychology deals with the animal soul, behavioral psychology focuses on the conditioned functioning of the vegetable and animal soul, cognitive psychology deals with the mental functions of the personal soul, humanistic psychology deals with the activities of the human soul and transpersonal psychology deals with ego-transcending consciousness of the secret soul and the secret of secret souls.

Spirit is beyond the realm of creation. It is directly connected with Alam e Lahoot (Unity of attributes and names) which is from Amr Allah (Command of Allah), Therefore, Spirit already knows everything including its own source.

== 'Aql ==
Aql is used in Islamic philosophy and theology for the intellect or the rational faculty of the soul that connects humans to God. According to Islamic beliefs, 'aql is what guides humans towards the right path (sirat al-mustaqim) and prevents them from deviating. In jurisprudence, it is associated with using reason as a source for sharia and has been translated as 'dialectical reasoning'.

== An Islamic model of psychology ==
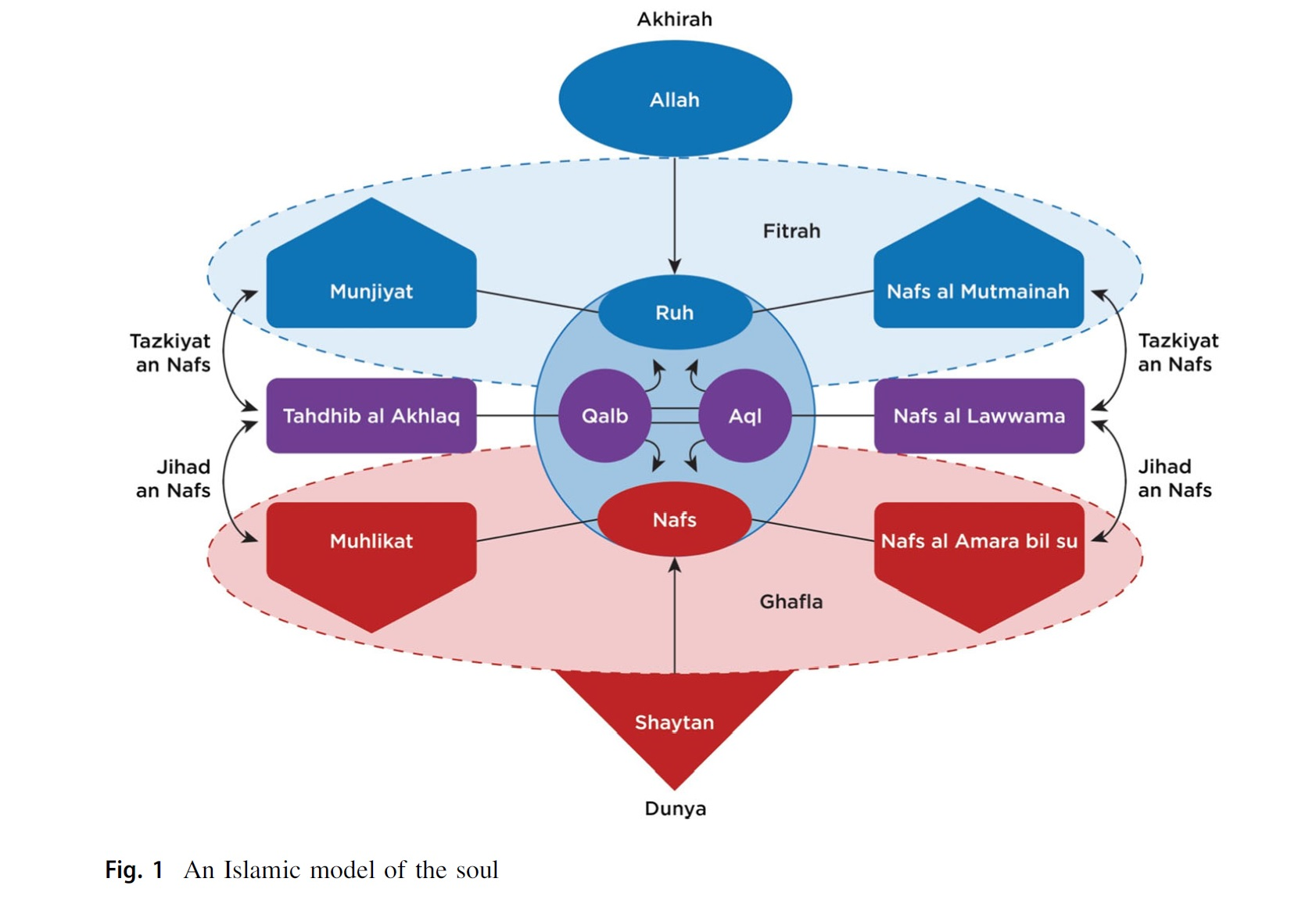
A visual rendition of the Islamic model of the soul based on a consensus of 18 surveyed academic and religious experts

There is now a substantial literature on combining these elements—ruh, qalb, nafs, and aql (mind)—to create an Islamic model for human behavior which can be the basis for an Islamic Psychology and Psychotherapy. A detailed overview of this work is available in Abdallah Rothman, Developing a Model of Islamic Psychology and Psychotherapy Islamic Theology and Contemporary Understandings of Psychology (2021). The diagram to the right provides a compact pictorial representation of the model.

== Lataif ==
The Laṭāʾif (Arabic: اللطائف) are special organs of psycho-physiological functioning in Sufi spirituality. Depending on context, the Laṭāʾif (plural) are also understood to be the experiential qualities or forms of those functions.

The Arabic word Laṭīfa (singular) means “subtlety” and the phrase Laṭā’if-e-sitta means “six subtleties” (although the number of Laṭāʾif can differ depending on the specific Sufi tradition).

The Laṭāʾif are viewed as aspects of Man's spiritual “Organ of Evolution”, known as Qalb (Heart).

The explicit realization of the Laṭāʾif in Qalb is considered by some Sufi orders -- especially the Naqshbandi -- to be a central part of the comprehensive spiritual development that produces the Sufi ideal of a Complete Human Being (Al-Insān al-Kāmil).

== Happiness in Sufism ==
Sufism aspires towards developing a soft, feeling, compassionate heart. Understanding through the ‘‘heart’s intelligence’’ is superior to understanding through the intelligence of the head. Indeed, the intelligence of the heart is the only instrument that can be used to discover the ultimate truth. To Sufis, reason is limited in many ways and cannot outgrow its inherent limitations. In particular, when reason denies intuitive knowledge and ‘‘blinds the eye of the heart’’, it becomes the target of strong criticism from Sufism. This stands in stark contrast to the Aristotelian and contemporary western emphasis on logical reasoning as the highest human faculty, which should rule the whole personality. On this basis, happiness cannot be achieved by reason and intellect, rather happiness is pursued via intuition and mystical experience. Another important concept in Sufism is the ego (the self or the nafs). The ego is a part of our psyche that consistently leads us off the spiritual path, a part of the self which commands us to do evil. The ego can impede the actualization of the spiritual potential of the heart if not controlled by the divine aspects of the personality. To achieve authentic happiness, the ego should be actively fought against throughout life. The ultimate state of happiness for a Sufi is the annihilation of the individual self. This state refers to the destruction of the individual self to become one with the Divine Being.

== Al-Ghazali ==
One of the most influential Sufi psychologists was Al-Ghazali (1058–1111). He discussed the concept of the self and the causes of its misery and happiness.

== See also ==
- Psychology in medieval Islam

== Literature ==
- Bakhtiar, Laleh (2019), Quranic Psychology of the Self: A Textbook on Islamic Moral Psychology (ilm al-nafs), Kazi Publications, ISBN 978-1567446418
- Frager, Robert, Heart, Self & Soul: The Sufi Psychology of Growth, Balance, and Harmony
- Frager, Robert, Essential Sufism
- Rahimi, Sadeq (2007). Intimate Exteriority: Sufi Space as Sanctuary for Injured Subjectivities in Turkey., Journal of Religion and Health, Vol. 46, No. 3, September 2007; pp. 409–422
- Haque, Amber (2004), "Psychology from Islamic Perspective: Contributions of Early Muslim Scholars and Challenges to Contemporary Muslim Psychologists", Journal of Religion and Health, 43 (4): 357–377, doi:10.1007/s10943-004-4302-z, S2CID 38740431
