= Zuhd =

Islamic concept of worldly renunciation

Zuhd (Arabic: زهد) is the Islamic ideal of unconcern for worldly things, usually translated as "asceticism" or "renunciation". Those who practise it are called zāhids (plural zuhhād), and the tradition is closely bound up with the beginnings of Sufism.

== Meaning ==
In Melchert's account, zuhd is better understood as "unconcern", chiefly toward the world, than as austerity, and in early sources the zāhid is the counterpart of the rāghib, the person who craves it. He prefers "renunciants" to "ascetics" partly because askētēs literally means "athlete", which suggests the Arabic mujtahid (one who exerts himself in devotion) rather than zāhid. Leah Kinberg's much-cited study, which collects many definitions, mostly from Sufi-period sources, concludes that zuhd is best understood as a general way of conduct; Melchert finds that conclusion unhelpfully vague.

== Origins and early development ==
Britannica ties the growth of zuhd to the early conquests: new wealth and luxury prompted calls to return to the example of Muhammad and his Companions, and the civil conflicts that followed led some religious men to condemn the bloodshed and favour abstinence. It adds that the Quran repeatedly stresses the transience of worldly life, even though lawful enjoyment is permitted. Some students of Islam have argued for influence from Christian hermits, and others for the pre-Islamic Arabian ḥanīfs.

According to Britannica, zuhd and zāhid were not used by the earliest Muslims for elaborate, systematic ascetic doctrines, which belong to the 8th century onward. Melchert, for his part, cites reports about figures who died between the late 7th century and the 730s that already set the zāhid against the rāghib. Hasan al-Basri (d. 728) was among the first to be called a zāhid, and later ascetics long treated his sayings as their main guide. Many scholars credit Ibrahim ibn Adham, who left his father's wealth behind for a life of poor wandering, and his disciple Shaqiq al-Balkhi (d. 810) with shaping zuhd into the form known in later periods.

== Zāhids and Sufism ==
Zāhids and the earliest Sufis were closely connected, and the two are often identified, the Sufi name being traced to wool garments. Sufi writers of later periods drew a distinction, dismissing zāhids as motivated by fear of hell or hope of paradise instead of love of God.

== Khorasan ==
In Melchert's account, Nishapur in the later 9th century saw two pious currents apparently vie for supremacy, the discreet Malāmatiyya and the more popular Karrāmiyya, while Sufism arrived from Baghdad. A scholarly view associated with Jacqueline Chabbi treats the three as distinct traditions.

=== Karrāmiyya ===
Muhammad ibn Karram (d. 869) gave his name to the Karrāmiyya, a movement with theological and legal dimensions that was influential in Khorasan and Afghanistan from about the 10th to the 13th century; communal living and strict asceticism were among its hallmarks. He was known as the imām-e zāhedān ("imam of the ascetics"), and his followers lived in khānaqāhs and showed their asceticism in how they dressed. They taught that complete trust in God (tawakkul) made earning even a minimum livelihood permitted but not obligatory, a position that was not new but with which they became closely identified. In time, some of the educated elite within the movement softened this severity and placed scholarship above devotional practice.

=== Malāmatiyya ===
The Malāmatiyya, by contrast, kept their renunciation discreet. Abu Hafs al-Haddad (d. 870s) of Nishapur, whom some sources describe as having worked for a time as a blacksmith, dressed unobtrusively and, unlike many ascetics of his day, avoided popular preaching. A now-lost 10th-century history of Nishapur called him a zāhid rather than a wāʿiẓ (preacher) and observed that his generation did not use the label ṣūfī.

=== Relation to Sufism ===
Whether Karrāmism and Sufism were truly distinct is debated. One view holds that Sufism absorbed Malāmatī teaching but stayed hostile to the Karrāmiyya, whose movement lacked an inner dimension; Zysow thinks this needs correcting, pointing to al-Sulami's citing Ibn Karram on tawakkul and to recent scholarship on Karrāmī mysticism, and Shafiʿi Kadkani sees no essential difference between the two. Melchert observes that by the early 11th century Sufism had taken in the Malāmatī current and possibly the Karrāmī one too.

== See also ==
- Asceticism

== Sources ==
- Melchert, Christopher (2020). Before Sufism: Early Islamic Renunciant Piety. Berlin/Boston: De Gruyter. doi:10.1515/9783110617962. ISBN 978-3-11-061651-4.
