= Tawakkul =

Islamic concept of the reliance on God or Trusting in God's plan

In the Arabic language, tawakkul (Arabic: تَوَكُّل) is a verbal noun of the verb tawakkala (Arabic: تَوَكَّلَ), meaning "to put trust" or "to rely" (into or on something or someone). It is also the word for the Islamic concept of the reliance on God or "trusting in God's plan". It is seen as "perfect trust in God and reliance on Him alone." It can also be referred to as God-consciousness. In fact, the Qur'an speaks of the fact that success is only achieved when trust is in God and the believer is steadfast and obeys God's commands.

== Etymology ==
The Arabic word tawakkul is a masdar (verbal noun) derived from the fifth form of the Arabic root وكل (w-k-l). It translates to "to give oneself over to, to rely/depend on, or have confidence in another".

== Concept ==
Tawakkul as a theological concept was formalized by Shaqiq al-Balkhi (d. 810), who defined it as a spiritual state or hal. Tawakkul is also considered a natural result of extreme zuhd. Zuhd can be described as being based on tawakkul or "trust in God alongside love of poverty." This has led to an argument over whether tawakkul is a consequence of perfect faith. An author wrote that someone that trusts in God is like a baby seeking its mother's breast and always finds it. He says that just like the infant, the one who trusts God is always led to God.

It has been said that there are three ranks of tawakkul: the trust of the believers, the trust of the select, and the trust of the select of the select. Each of these ranks are achieved through active reformation of the mind and self. The trust of the believers is simply living one day at a time and not worrying what tomorrow will bring you; simply trusting in what God has planned. The trust of the select is trusting God with no motives or desires. It is casting aside all wants. And finally the trust of the select of the select is giving yourself over to God completely so that His desires become yours. In other words, "trust in God is to be satisfied with and rely on God Most High." It is said that because God created everything and therefore everything belongs to him, it is selfish to want anything other than what God wants or not want something God gives to you.

Since early times in Islam there has been debate as to the extent of tawakkul as a virtue in everyday life. This debate centered around questions such as whether or not tawakkul allowed for God to use intermediary causes, and the degree of reliance on God. Views of extreme and total dependence on God to the point of pure fatalism were popular among rejectionist ascetics. Thinkers such as Bayazid Bastami instead advocate the virtue of "kasab", or "earning a living".

== Muslim tradition ==
=== Quran ===
The active participle form of tawakkul is used in 38 passages in the Qur'an.

- And whoever puts all her or his trust in Allah, s/he will be enough for him. (Quran 65:3)
- And put all your trust [in Allah], if you truly are believers. (Quran 5:23)
- He is Rabb of the east and west, there is no deity except Him, so take him as your Protector. (Quran 73:9)
- Put your trust in the living Allah who never dies, and celebrate His praise. (Quran 25:58)
- In Allah should the trustful trust. (Quran 14:12)

=== Hadith ===
Umar bin Khattab said: I heard Muhammad (peace be upon him) saying, "If you all depend on Allah with due reliance, He would certainly give you provision as He gives it to the birds who go forth hungry in the morning and return with full bellies at dusk." (At-Tirmidhi)

Anas bin Malik narrated that a man said: "O Messenger of Allah! Shall I tie it (my camel) and rely (tawakkul) (upon Allah), or leave it loose and rely(upon Allah)?" He said: "Tie it and rely(upon Allah)." (Tirmidhi 2517)

In another hadith relayed to Ibn Abbas, the Prophet Muhammad describes how one should put all trust in Allah as not the entire world can grant benefit or harm to an individual except by the will of Allah:

“O young man, I shall teach you some words [of advice]: Be mindful of Allah and Allah will protect you. Be mindful of Allah and you will find Him in front of you. If you ask, then ask Allah [alone]; and if you seek help, then seek help from Allah [alone]. And know that if the nation were to gather together to benefit you with anything, they would not benefit you except with what Allah had already prescribed for you. And if they were to gather together to harm you with anything, they would not harm you except with what Allah had already prescribed against you. The pens have been lifted and the pages have dried.” (At-Tirmidhi)

There is a hadith "Tie it and Rely" that says: Anas ibn Malik narrated that a man said: "O Messenger of Allah! Shall I tie it [a camel] and rely [upon Allah], or leave it loose and rely [upon Allah]?" He said: "Tie it and rely [upon Allah]."

=== Fiqh ===
Many Muslim legends such as those of Rabi'a illustrate tawakkul. Of Rabi'a, it is said that when her donkey died in the desert while she was on the hajj, she refused aid from a caravan, instead depending on God to provide for her. Sahl al-Tustarī claimed that perceiving secondary causes was a sign of a lack of reliance on God.

Imam Ibn Qayyim al-Jawziyya said:

“At-Tawakkul on Allah was thus made a condition of Imaan; its absence therefore indicates the lack of Imaan. So, whoever does not have at-Tawakkul does not possess Imaan.”

== See also ==
- Taqwa
- Insha'Allah
