= Abou Ben Adhem (poem) =

1834 poem by Leigh Hunt

- by Leigh Hunt
- First published in: The Amulet
- Country: England
- Genre: Romantic Orientalism
- Meter: Iambic pentameter (most of it)
- Rhyme scheme: AABB CCDD
- Publication date: 1834
- Lines: 18

"Abou Ben Adhem" is a poem written in 1834 by the English critic, essayist and poet Leigh Hunt. It concerns a pious Middle Eastern sheikh who finds the 'love of God' to have blessed him. The poem has been praised for its non-stereotypical depiction of an Arab. Hunt claims through this poem that true worship manifests itself through the acts of love and service that one shows one's fellowmen and women. The character of Abou Ben Adhem is said to have been based on the ascetic Sufi mystic Ibrahim bin Adham. The poem, due to its Middle Eastern setting and spiritualistic undertones, can be considered an example of Romantic Orientalism. The first known appearance of this poem is in an album kept by the writer Anna Maria Hall, whose husband, Samuel Carter Hall published it in 1834, in his gift book The Amulet.

== Analysis ==
Abou Ben Adhem (may his tribe increase!)

Awoke one night from a deep dream of peace,

And saw, within the moonlight in his room,

Making it rich, and like a lily in bloom,

An angel writing in a book of gold:—

Exceeding peace had made Ben Adhem bold,

And to the presence in the room he said,

"What writest thou?"—The vision raised its head,

And with a look made of all sweet accord,

Answered, "The names of those who love the Lord."

"And is mine one?" said Abou. "Nay, not so,"

Replied the angel. Abou spoke more low,

But cheerly still; and said, "I pray thee, then,

Write me as one that loves his fellow men."

The angel wrote, and vanished. The next night

It came again with a great wakening light,

And showed the names whom love of God had blest,

And lo! Ben Adhem's name led all the rest.

The poem shows a surprisingly liberal attitude for its time, and espouses the belief that true worship is in the service of others. The angel is said to be a representation of God's omnipresence, which observes anything and anyone.

Apart from the end rhyme scheme, Hunt uses alliteration to enrich the cadence of the poem. Some examples are:

Abou Ben Adhem (Line 1)

Deep dream of peace (Line 2)

Nay, not so (Line 11)

I pray thee then (Line 13)

The poem is written in a narrative style, and it is structured into four stanzas of 5, 5, 4 and 4 lines. Here, the stanzas are 'closed' and so are the couplets (the pairs of rhyming lines), — i.e., they end with punctuation. While the poem is metrically flexible, it essentially displays an iambic pentameter style.

The poem draws from Arabian lore, where in the Islamic month of Nous Sha'ban, God takes the golden book of mankind and chooses those dear to Him who He will call in the coming year. Thus indirectly, this is also a poem about a 'blessed death'. Leigh Hunt's source for this was Barthélemy d'Herbelot, Bibliothèque orientale, first published in 1697. However, while d'Herbelot has Abou-Ishak-Ben-Adhem ask God to write him down as one who is a friend of those who love the Lord ('écrivez-moi, je vous prie, pour l'amour d'eux, en qualité d'ami de ceux qui aiment Dieu'), the poem has him say "Write me as one, that loves his fellow men".

Russell Jones, in the Journal of the Royal Asiatic Society, writes that the identification of Abou Ben Adhem with Ibrahim ibn Adham was through two notes by Henry Beveridge and Vincent Arthur Smith in the same journal in 1909 and 1910.

== Legacy ==
The verse "Write me as one who loves his fellow men" came to be used in Hunt's epitaph, unveiled by Lord Haughton in 1869 at Kensal Green in North Kensington.

The poem is mentioned as a subject for public recital by a child character in Arnold Bennett's novel Hilda Lessways (1911).

The composer Edgar Bainton set an edited version of the text in his composition of the same name, published in 1919.

The musical Flahooley (1951) features a genie named Abou Ben Atom, based on either Ibrahim or Abou played in the original Broadway production by Irwin Corey.

The 1966 film Alfie features Michael Caine's titular character reciting the poem at bedtime to the infant son he had with Julia Foster's character.

In the Not the Nine O'Clock News episode "Don't Get Your Vicars in a Twist" (1980), a sketch featured a reading of the poem, with Rowan Atkinson's part delivered in mock-Welsh gibberish.
