= Jeff Stilwell =

American novelist (born 1967)

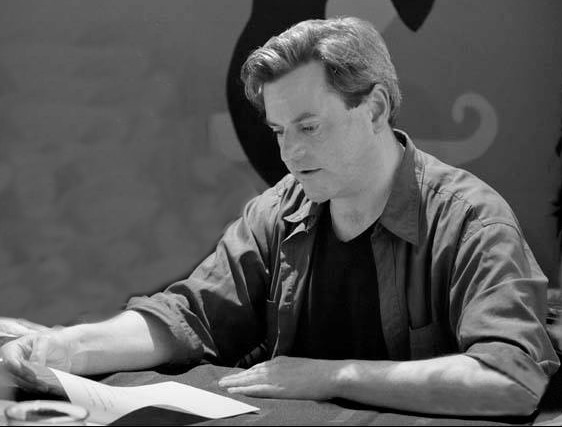
- Stilwell reading from one of his works. (2014)
- Born: Jeffrey Carlyle Stilwell; June 21, 1967 (age 59); Wisconsin, United States
- Spouse: Manya Vee (1994-present)

Jeff Stilwell (born June 21, 1967) is an American humanist thinker, author, and illustrator.

== Background ==
Stilwell was born in the Midwest and went "searching for God" at the age of ten on his paper route. His search continued throughout the next decades. He investigated several denominations of Christianity, then classical Buddhism, Taoism, and Confucianism. He lived in Asia for a number of years to observe those belief systems in action. He claims to have been influenced by the Chan master Huineng, the Taoist storyteller Zhuangzi, and the Confucian thinker Mengtzu. Returning to the United States, he attended the Christian seminary at Seattle University's School of Theology and Ministry, focusing heavily on the writings of thinkers such as Augustine, Anselm, Thomas Aquinas, and Karl Rahner. He earned a Master's in Pastoral Studies but did not pursue ministry because he felt that he "was helping no one." After seminary, he pursued studies in Hinduism, particularly the writings of Adi Shankara and the Bhagavad Gita. He also studied Islam, particularly the thoughts of Sufi poet Rabia Basri.

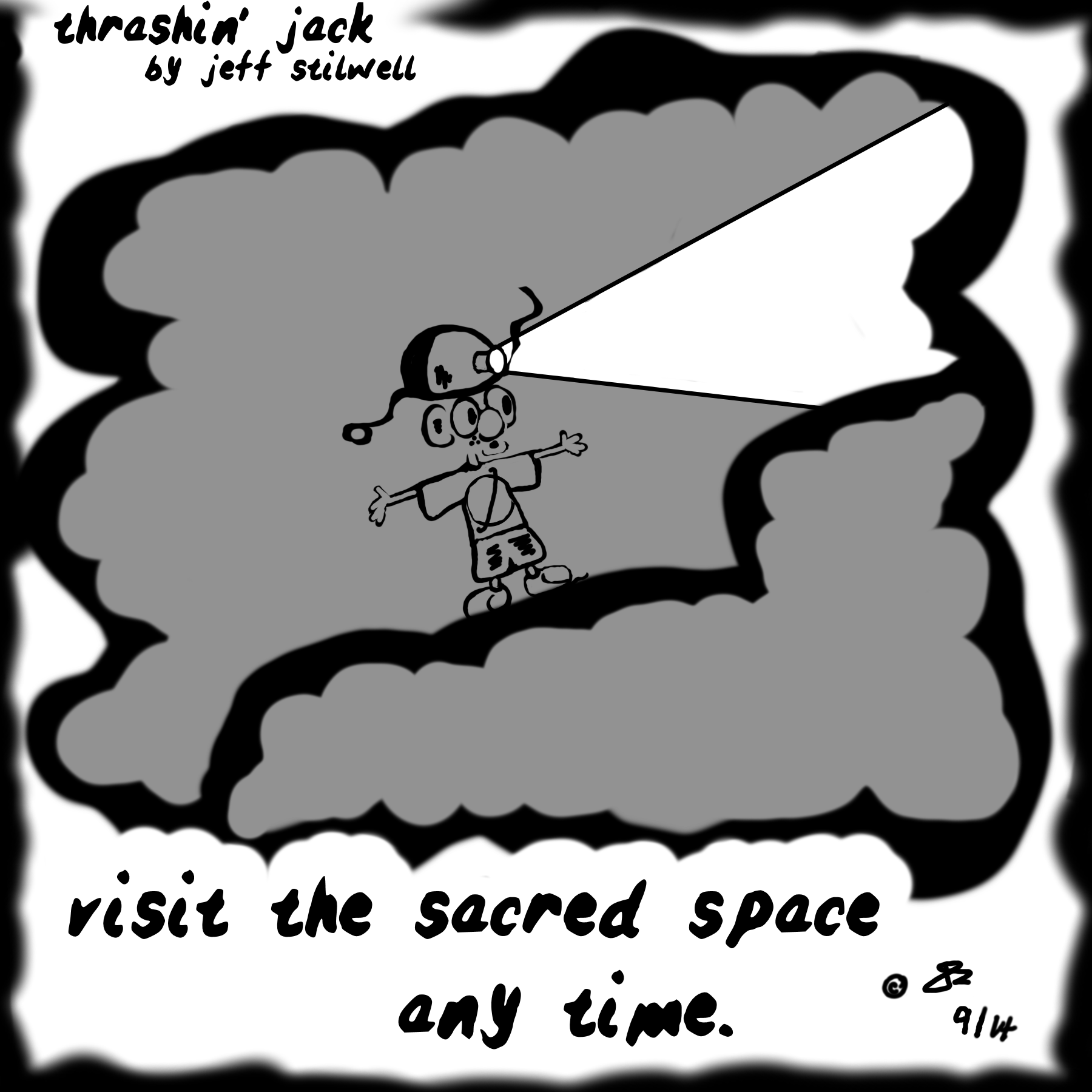
One of Stilwell's Sacred Space comics.

== Thrashin' Jack Comics ==
Stilwell's first cartoon character "Bosatsu" was featured in My Edmonds News in 2013. Stilwell soon made some changes, saying, "My character threatened to walk out of the strip if he didn't get a name change. Something less abstruse and more fun. So, I caved. As of today, "bosatsu" is set aside in favor of "thrashin' jack". (He's also demanding lighter, sillier content. And, he wants more than one t-shirt to wear. We'll see...)"

Thrashin' Jack was later featured in Stilwell's humanist work Here and Now: A Whimsical Take on God. Radio personality Sam Mulvey featured Stilwell on his program Ask An Atheist, saying that Here and Now is "A really neat book...It's got really nice art...It tells a really good story..." Critic Dave Brouillette writes of Here and Now: "While the elementary level language and comic-strip style artwork makes it easy to miss the complex ideas just under the surface, there are deep currents hiding beneath what at first glance seems like a very shallow experience."

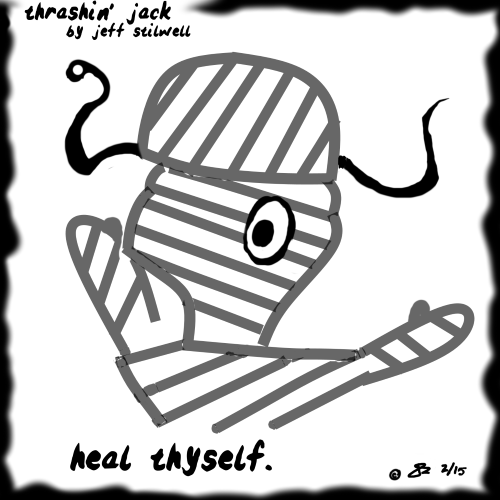
Healing Circles logo: Jeff Stilwell's Thrashin' Jack has embraced his own healing so enthusiastically that he has wrapped himself entirely in bandages.

== Work with veterans ==
Stilwell also collaborates with the Fullness Circles Foundation in moderating Healing Circles with wounded and returning veterans.

== Stage plays ==
In the early 2000s Stilwell was involved in theatre in the Seattle area, earning "critical acclaim from reviewers" in the Pacific Northwest for his stage plays.

Stilwell's plays Teacup Tipsy, One Tile Short and Traffic Stop received positive notice from local media. A local production of his play Traffic Stop received two awards at the Kaleidoscope 2007 competition: Best Actress and Best Overall Production (second runner up).

A complete list of his staged works follows...

- A Dropped Stitch – New Classics Theatre, October 2010
- Mural Mania – New Classics Theatre, May 2010
- Teacup Tipsy – Driftwood Players, April 2010
- Granny Knot (a revival) – New Classics Theatre, January 2010
- Fatimah's Scarf – Seattle Prep, December 2009
- One Tile Short – New Classics Theatre, July 2009
- Do Buddhists Drink Beer? – Driftwood Players, April 2009
- Gabby's Notion – Broadview Players, March 2009
- The Promise of Pittesville – Driftwood Players, April 2008
- A Warp-ed Door – Edmonds Repertory Theatre, October 2007
- Granny Knot – Driftwood Players, July 2007
- Traffic Stop – Driftwood Players, March 2007
- Hand Off – Kindred Circle Players, August 2005
- Penny Upstart and the Widget War – Kindred Circle Players, February 2005
- No Middle Ground – Matamadu Productions, November 2002
- To Be Tempted – Pilgrim Productions, October 1986

== Live performance ==
He and his wife, Manya, founded a live music scene in Edmonds, called Edmonds Tunes. For much of the first year, Stilwell played the Happy Ham, performing stand up comedy every Friday night. Stilwell also founded Edmonds Story Time, which gives writers the chance to share their new material with a sympathetic audience in local coffee shops.

== Philanthropy in the visual arts ==
Stilwell has organized artistic opportunities for artists, raising money, scheduling and curating exhibitions. With his wife, he founded and directed the Edmonds Art Walk, one of the largest art walks in the Pacific Northwest. The couple also founded the Edmonds Mural Society, which has mounted seventeen murals celebrating the beauty, history and people of picturesque Edmonds, Washington.
