= Abou Ben Adhem Shrine Mosque =

- U.S. National Register of Historic Places
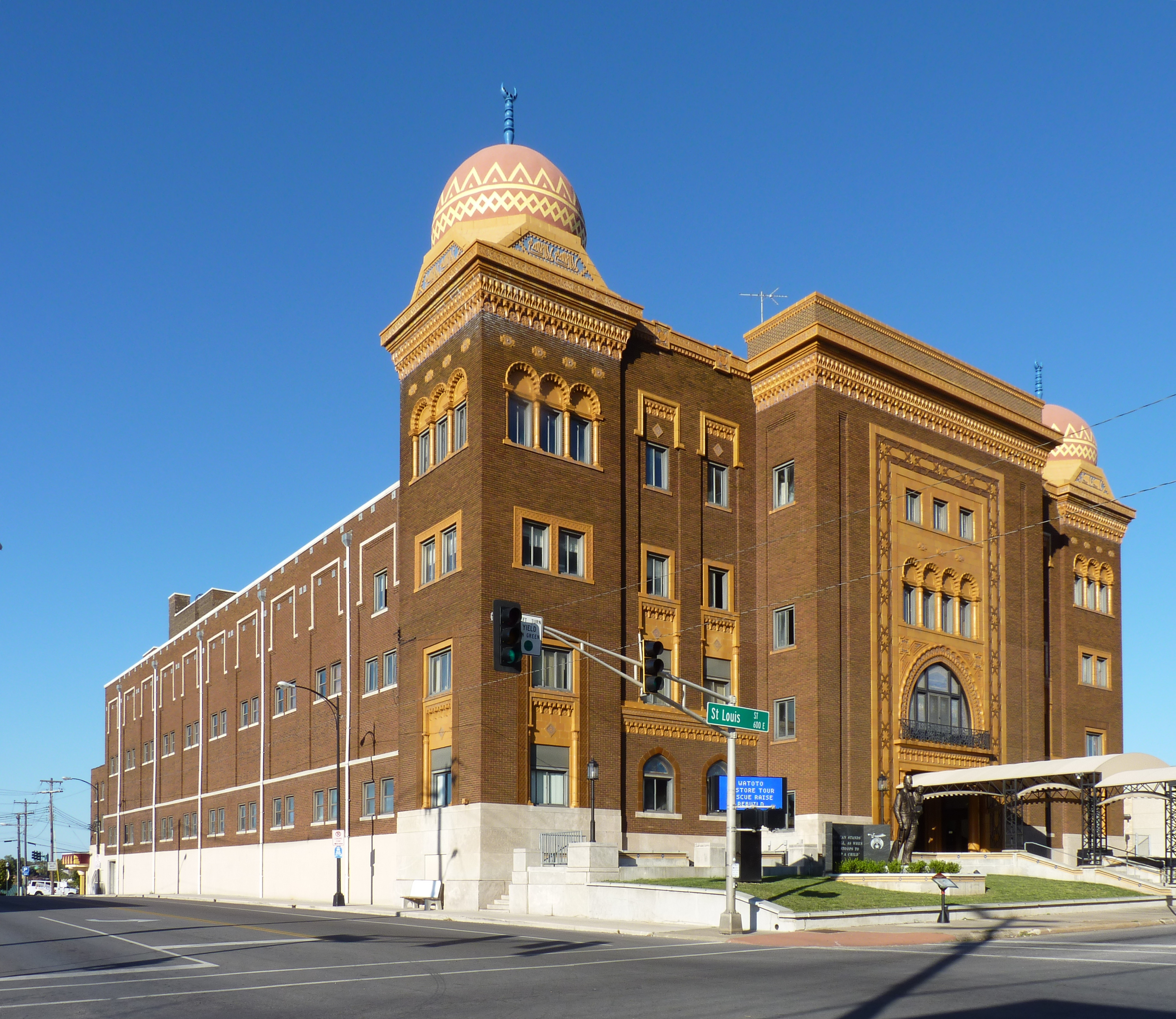
- The Abou Ben Adhem Shrine Mosque is located in downtown Springfield, Missouri on St. Louis Street.

- Location within Missouri Location within the United States
- Location: Springfield, Missouri
- Coordinates: 37°12′33.94″N 93°17′10.5″W
- Area: less than one acre
- Built: 1920
- Architect: Heckenlively & Mark; Olson, John
- Architectural style: Moorish
- Website: https://www.abashrine.com/
- NRHP reference No.: 82003137
- Added to NRHP: September 9, 1982

The Abou Ben Adhem Shrine Mosque (often known locally as "the Shrine Mosque" or simply "the Shrine") is a building of arabesque design located in downtown Springfield, Missouri, United States. It was built in 1923 for a cost of $600,000. It is owned by the Abou Ben Adhem Shriners and for many years was the site of the annual Shrine Circus. The five-story building includes a large auditorium with seating for over 4,000. The name derives from Ibrahim ibn Adham, taken from the poem "Abou Ben Adhem" by Leigh Hunt.

It was listed on the National Register of Historic Places in 1982.
