= Russell Jones (orientalist) =

British orientalist (1926–2019)

Russell Jones (14 April 1926 – 9 June 2019) was a British Orientalist who researched Malay and Indonesian languages and culture in the broad sense. He is a noted scholar of pre-modern Malay literature, particularly when it comes to relating the texts to the manuscripts. His other interests include foreign influences on Malay and Indonesian, the Chinese in the Nanyang, and the history of papermaking. His research was focused on the paper and watermarks of Malay manuscripts.

== Life and career ==
Jones was born in England, near the Welsh border, and brought up on a farm in Shropshire. He left school aged of 16, and aged 18 he enlisted in the Royal Marines. He was posted to Singapore in 1945, then to Batavia, Dutch East Indies, which inspired a lasting interest in Malay and Indonesian. On returning to England, he studied Malay at the School of Oriental and African Studies in London.

For ten years, from 1948, he served in the Colonial Service, in the Federation of Malaya Immigration Department. He was stationed, amongst other places, in Perlis and Kelantan, and in 1950 had the task of introducing immigration control for the first time in Johor. This was the time of the Emergency (the communist uprising), and security matters inevitably impinged on the work of the Immigration Department. For the latter part of his service he held the post of Senior Assistant Controller of Immigration at the headquarters in Penang.

His interest in Chinese arose during this period. He acquired a knowledge of the Hokkien dialect of Chinese (Minnanhua), and took the government examinations in spoken Amoy Hokkien following private tuition in Singapore and Penang. This enabled him to introduce a system of recording Chinese names in the department, based on the Chinese characters, and eventually led to the publication of a book on Chinese names, and another on Chinese loan-words in Malay and Indonesian.

Returning to Europe after Merdeka, he resumed his studies which included Malay, Dutch and Arabic languages, and Islamic history, at the School of Oriental and African Studies, followed by three years of doctoral research at the University of Leiden. In 1961 he went to Australia, where he was a lecturer in Malay in the Department of Indonesian and Malay Studies under F. H. van Naerssen at the University of Sydney until 1965. His subsequent academic career, until he retired in 1984, was in SOAS, University of London, and where he subsequently remained an honorary Research Fellow. Altogether he published about sixty articles and books.

In 1973 he was instrumental in founding the international Indonesian Etymological Project, which gathered a corpus of about twenty thousand loan-words in Indonesian and Malay, leading to the publication of a book in 2007, and embodied in a web site in Bangkok, http://sealang.net/indonesia. Also in 1973 he was instrumental in founding a newsletter which over the years was transformed into the academic journal Indonesia and the Malay World, published by Routledge.

His Ph.D., on the legend of the Sufi, Ibrahim ibn Adham, relied extensively on Malay (and some Arabic) manuscript sources. This and subsequent research into Malay manuscripts, nearly all written on Dutch or British or Italian paper, brought a realisation of the need to study the watermarks to establish the date they were written, or copied - known as the science of filigranology. He studied the filigranology of Malay/Indonesian manuscripts for more than forty years, becoming an authority in this field. As he approached the end of his working life, he dedicated himself to passing on his knowledge to the next generation of Indonesian and Malay codicologists.

In retirement, he lived in Cornwall, England.

== Selected publications ==
- Jones, Russell (1959) Chinese Names: Notes on the Use of Surnames and Personal Names by the Chinese in Malaya. Singapore: Malayan Branch of the Royal Asiatic Society. This offprint of the Society's Journal (Vol. XXXII, Part 3, Aug. 1959) is based on research carried in Penang in 1958-59 and covers components of names, variations in those, characters used, Western spellings and the changing of names and mainly concentrates on names used in Mandarin, Cantonese, Hokkien and Teochew.
- Jones, Russell. (1979) Ten Conversion Myths from Indonesia in N. Levtzion ed., "Conversion to Islam", pp. 129–58.
- Jones, Russell (1985) Hikayat Sultan Ibrahim Ibn Adham =: Ḥikāyat Sulṭān Ibrāhīm Ibn Adʹham : an Edition of an Anonymous Malay Text with Translation and Notes. Berkeley, Calif: Center for South and Southeast Asia Studies, University of California, Print.
- Jones, Russell, Carstairs Douglas, and Thomas Barclay. (2007) Loan-words in Indonesian and Malay. Leiden: KITLV Press.
- Jones, Russell. (1997) Chinese Names: The Traditions Surrounding the Use of Chinese Surnames and Personal Names. Petaling Jaya, Selangor Darul Ehsan, Malaysia: Pelanduk Publications
