= Psychology in the medieval Islamic world =

Historical Islamic psychological studies

Islamic psychology or ʿilm al-nafs (Arabic: علم النفس), the science of the nafs ("self" or "psyche"), is the medical and philosophical study of the psyche from an Islamic perspective and addresses topics in psychology, neuroscience, philosophy of mind, and psychiatry as well as psychosomatic medicine. In Islam, mental health and mental illness were viewed with a holistic approach. This approach emphasized the mutual connection between maintaining adequate mental wellbeing and good physical health in an individual. People who practice Islam thought it was necessary to maintain positive mental health in order to partake in prayer and other religious obligations.

Concepts from Islamic thought have been reexamined by Muslim psychologists and scholars in the 20th and 21st centuries.

== Terminology ==
In the writings of Muslim scholars, the term Nafs (self) was used to denote individual personality and the term fitrah for human nature. Nafs encompassed a broad range of faculties including the qalb (heart), the ruh (soul), the aql (intellect) and irada (will). Muslim scholarship was strongly influenced by Greek as well as by the study of scripture, drawing particularly from Galen's understanding of the four humors of the body.

In medieval Islamic medicine in particular, the study of mental illness was a speciality of its own, and was variously known as A‘ilaj al-nafs (approximately "curing/treatment of the soul/self/ideas), al-tibb al-ruhani ("the healing of the spirit," or "spiritual health") and tibb al-qalb ("healing of the heart/self," or "mental medicine").

The Classical Arabic term for the mentally ill was "majnoon" which is derived from the term "Jenna", which means "covered". It was originally thought that mentally ill individuals could not differentiate between the real and the unreal. However, due to the nuanced nature of individual cases, the treatment of the mentally ill could not be generalized as it was in medieval Europe. This term was gradually redefined among the educated, and was defined by Avicenna (Ibn Sīnā) as "one who suffers from a condition in which reality is replaced with fantasy".

== Ethics and theology ==
In the Islamic world, special legal protections were given to the mentally ill. This attitude was reinforced by scripture, as exemplified in Sura 4:5 of the Qur'an:

Do not give your property which God assigned you to manage to the insane: but feed and clothe the insane with this property and tell splendid words to them.

— "

This Quranic verse summarized Islam's attitudes towards the mentally ill, who were considered unfit to manage property but must be treated humanely and be kept under care by either a guardian or the state.

== Psychology during the Islamic Golden Age ==
The period comprising the 8th to the 15th centuries of the Gregorian calendar is known to scholars as the Islamic Golden Age. This marked a time of numerous advances and discoveries in the Islamic arts and sciences, during which Islamic scholars came to understand that certain conditions can alter an individual's spiritual and psychological states (those seen as majnoon (mad) being perceived as having imbalances in these states). A prominent philosopher during this time was al-Ghazali(1058–1111), who proposed that maintaining a balanced connection between the spiritual and psychological conditions within the body was vital in order to sustain a close relationship with God. al-Ghazali further explained that divergence from this interconnectedness could result in abnormalities within an individual's mental health.

== Major contributors ==
=== Muhammad ibn Zakariya al-Razi ===
Muhammad ibn Zakariya al-Razi (865–925), known as Rhazes in the western tradition, was an influential Persian physician, philosopher, and scientist during the Golden Age of Islam, and among the first in the world to write on mental illness and psychotherapy. As chief physician of Baghdad hospital, he was also the director of one of the first psychiatric wards in the world. Two of his works in particular, El-Mansuri and Al-Hawi, provide descriptions and treatments for mental illnesses.

=== Abu-Ali al-Husayn ibn Abdalah ibn-Sina ===
Abu-Ali al-Husayn ibn Abdalah ibn-Sina (980–1030), known to the west as Avicenna, was a Persian polymath who is widely regarded for his writings on such diverse subjects as philosophy, physics, medicine, mathematics, geology, Islamic theology, and poetry. In his most widely celebrated work, the Canon of Medicine (Al-Qanun-fi-il-Tabb), he provided descriptions and treatments for such conditions as insomnia, mania, vertigo, paralysis, stroke, epilepsy, and depression as well as male sexual dysfunction. He was a pioneer in the field of psychosomatic medicine, linking changes in mental state to changes in the body.

=== Abu Zayd al-Balkhi ===
Abu Zayd al-Balkhi (850-934) was a Muslim psychologist and physician during the Islamic Golden Age. His many contributions were vital to the understanding of mental health as well as how to treat various mental illnesses. Al-Balkhi is famous for his work titled “Sustenance of the Body and Soul.” In it, he encouraged other physicians to treat the body and mind as a whole and thus take a holistic approach to medicine. This thinking is significant because it laid the foundation for a psychophysiological approach to healthy living in Medieval Islam. In al-Balkhi’s writings, he explains that the soul experiences an array of emotions such as distress, sadness, and fear when the body undergoes physical illnesses.

The establishment of cognitive therapy is credited to al-Balkhi. When his patients experienced distress, he developed an approach that motivated them to think positively using healthy cognitions. al-Balkhi and other important Islamic scholars also implemented the technique of reciprocal inhibition when treating their patients. Furthermore, al-Balkhi also places emphasis on how environmental factors, such as housing, exercise, and nutrition, can affect a person’s mental wellbeing. al-Balkhi’s contributions also consisted of identifying the difference between psychosis and neurosis. He categorized neuroses into four groups: obsessions, sadness and depression, fear and anxiety, and anger and aggression. The analysis al-Balki made in medieval Islamic psychology is still relevant to modern psychology.

== Melancholia ==
The mental health disorder melancholia came under intensive study in the Islamic world of the Middle Ages. Islamic scholars described melancholia as a condition the principal symptom of which was a state of constant sadness, the cause of which was believed to be an excess of black bile in the body. The varied symptoms of melancholia were believed to derive from the particular area of the body in which the (conjectural) black bile had become concentrated. The resulting state of sadness experienced by sufferers was categorized into three different types: first sadness originating in trauma or stress, secondly sadness caused by external (organic/physiological) factors, such as inadequate nourishment of the body and thirdly the everyday sadness inherent in the human condition. This classification system is similar to the way in which present models analyze depression. In the medieval Islamic world, however, a diagnosis of melancholia could also encompass such varied cerebral phenomena as epilepsy and mania.

== Mental healthcare ==
The earliest bimaristans were built in the 9th century, and large bimaristans built in the 13th century contained separate wards for mentally ill patients.

=== Treatment of mental illness ===
In addition to medication, treatment for mental illness might include baths, music, talk therapy, hijama (cupping), and aromatherapy. Scholars and physicians of this time period were some of the first to emphasize psychosomatic medicine, the emphasis placed on the relationship between illness of the mind and problems in the body. Medicine would be prescribed in order to re-balance the four humors of the body, an imbalance of which might result in psychosis. Insomnia, for example, was thought to result from excessive amounts of the dry humors which could be remedied by the use of humectants.

== See also ==
- Islamic philosophy
- Medicine in the medieval Islamic world
- Ophthalmology in medieval Islam
- Science in medieval Islam
- Sufi psychology
