= Dhu'l-Nun al-Misri =

Egyptian Sufi saint (859–862)

Dhū'l-Nūn al-Miṣrī
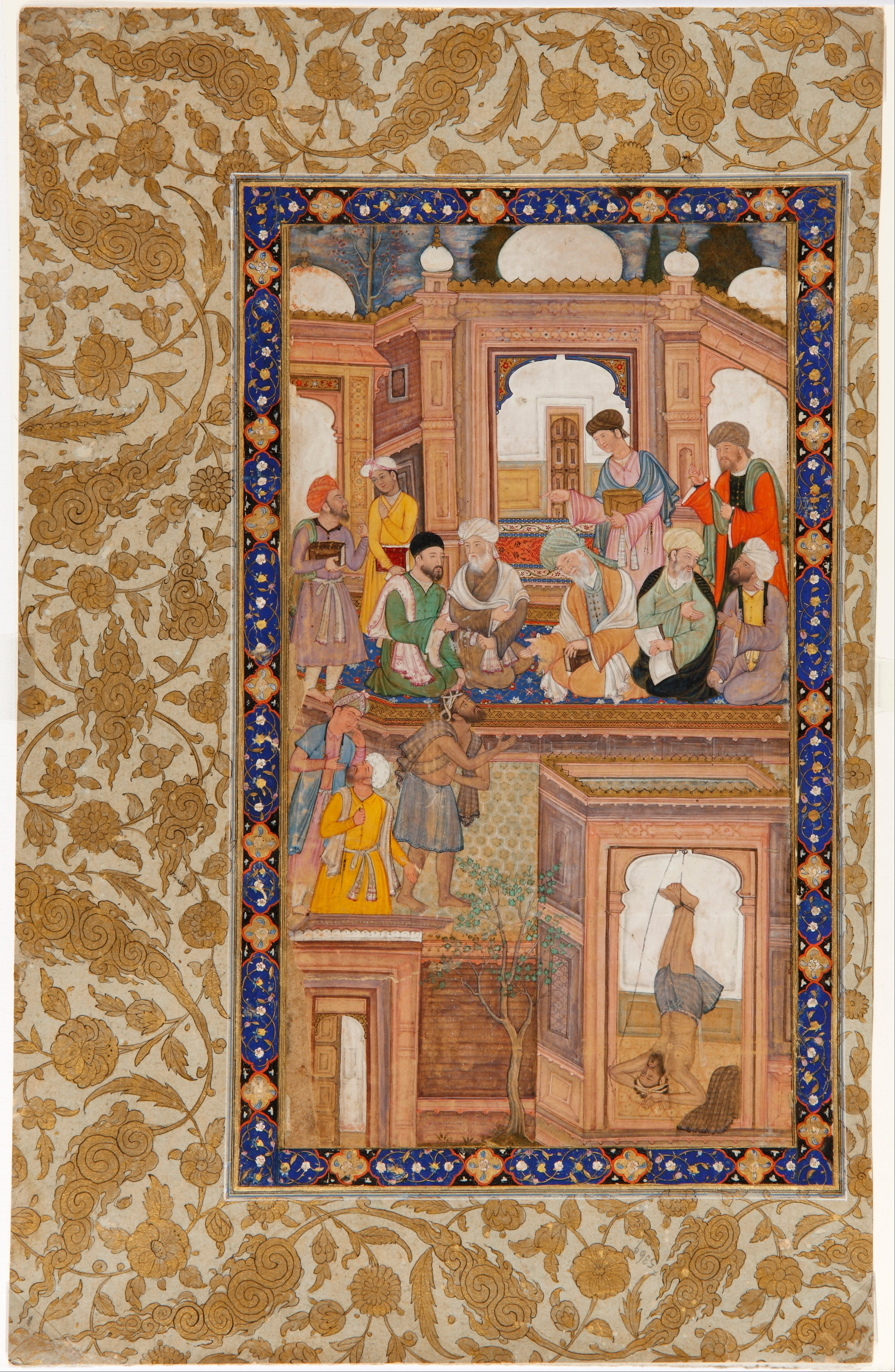
- This 17th-century Mughal miniature illustrates a pivotal episode from the life of Dhu'l-Nun al-Misri, where he encounters an ascetic suspended upside down from a tree. Dhu'l-Nun is depicted as one of the Muslim mystics holding a closed book, a symbol of his realization that direct spiritual experience supersedes written scholarship.
- Born: 796; Akhmim, Upper Egypt
- Died: 859-862 (aged 63-66); Giza, Upper Egypt
- Resting place: City of the Dead, Cairo, Egypt
- Other names: Dhū'n-Nūn al-Miṣrī, Zūl-Nūn al-Miṣrī
- Education: Ancient Egyptian disciplines of alchemy, medicine, and Greek philosophy
- Known for: Early Sufi mystic and alchemist

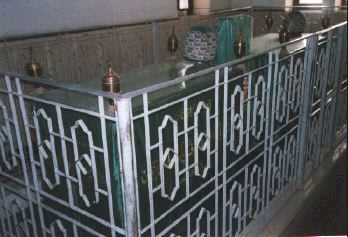

Dhū'l-Nūn al-Miṣrī (Note: Full name: Dhū'l-Nūn Abū l-Fayḍ Thawbān b. Ibrāhīm al-Miṣrī Arabic: ذو النون المصري, romanized: Ḏū n-Nūn al-Miṣrī) (d. Giza, 859-862), often rendered in English literature as Dhū'n-Nūn al-Miṣrī or Zūl-Nūn al-Miṣrī, was an early Egyptian Sufi mystic and alchemist. His surname al-Miṣrī means "the Egyptian".

He was born in Akhmim, Upper Egypt in 796 and is said to be of Nubian descent. Dhu'l-Nun is said to have made some study of the scholastic disciplines of alchemy, medicine, and Greek philosophy in his early life, before coming under the mentorship of the mystic Saʿdūn of Cairo, who is described in traditional accounts of Dhu'l-Nun's life as both "his teacher and spiritual director."

Celebrated for his legendary wisdom both in his own life and by later Islamic thinkers, Dhu'l-Nun has been venerated as one of the greatest saints of the early era of Sufism.

== Name ==
It has been speculated by scholars whether "Dhu'l-Nun" was an honorific (laqab) for the mystic rather than his name proper, which is sometimes believed to be Thawbān. As "Dhu'l-Nun," literally meaning "the one of the fish [or whale]," or an abbreviation of "from Nineveh" as in the Quranic reference to the Hebrew prophet Jonah in Islamic tradition, it is sometimes believed that this title was given to Dhu'l-Nun in commemoration of Jonah.

== Life ==
Dhu'l-Nun is one of the most prominent saints of early Islamic tradition, appearing "in the earliest accounts of Ṣūfism as the leading figure of his generation." Often depicted as the spiritual master of Sahl al-Tustari (c. 818–896), the traditional hagiographies relate that the latter refused to engage in mystical discourse until after Dhu'l-Nun's death, on account of his recognition of Dhu'l-Nun's elevated rank in wisdom and gnosis.

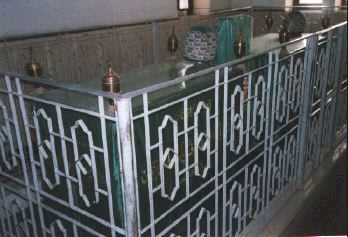
Tomb of Dhu'l-Nun al-Misri (AD 796–859) in Cairo's City of the Dead.

Dhu'l-Nun al-Misri is considered among the most prominent saints of early Sufism and holds a position in the Sufi chronicles as high as Junayd Baghdadi (d. 910) and Bayazid Bastami (d. 874). He studied under various teachers and travelled extensively in Arabia and Syria. The Muslim scholar and Sufi Sahl al-Tustari was one of Dhu'l-Nun al-Misri's students. In 829 he was arrested on a charge of heresy and sent to prison in Baghdad, but after examination he was released on the caliph's orders to return to Cairo, where he died in 859; his tombstone has been preserved.

Dhu'l-Nun's name came about in relation to an incident on a sea voyage. He was falsely accused of stealing a jewel from a merchant. He cried out "O Creator, Thou knowest best", whereupon a large number of fish raised their heads above the waves, each bearing a jewel in its mouth.

A legendary alchemist and thaumaturge, he is supposed to have known the secret of the Egyptian hieroglyphs. His sayings and poems, which are extremely dense and rich in mystical imagery, emphasize knowledge or gnosis (marifah) more than fear (makhafah) or love (mahabbah), the other two major paths of spiritual realization in Sufism. None of his written works have survived, but a vast collection of poems, sayings, and aphorisms attributed to him continues to live on in oral tradition.

Osho mentions him as "an Egyptian Sufi mystic, one of the greatest who has ever walked on the earth".

== In Yazidism ==
In Yazidism, Dhū'l-Nūn al-Miṣrī (known in Yazidi tradition as Denûnê Misrî or Danūn of Egypt) is venerated as a key holy figure and precursor among early Sufi mystics highly revered in the religion alongside figures such as Hasan al-Basri, Rabi'a al-'Adawiyya, Bayazid Bastami, and Mansur al-Hallaj. Yazidi oral tradition draws a distinction between these early pre-institutional ascetics (zahids)—whose teachings on spiritual poverty and gnosis (ma'rifa) prefigured Yazidi theology—and later medieval Sufis, who are viewed as fully Islamicized.

=== Qawlē Danūnē Miṣrī ===
Dhū'l-Nūn is the central figure of a dedicated 41-stanza hagiographic sacred hymn (qawl) in Kurmanji, titled Qawlē Danūnē Miṣrī ("The Hymn of Danūnē Miṣrī"). He is also commemorated in other sacred texts, such as the hymn of Pīr Sīnī Bahrī—where the saint identifies himself with Dhū'l-Nūn— as well as in the Beyt of Shēkh Ālē Shamsā, and the liturgical text Diroze, which recount the spiritual suffering (hālē Danūn) of the mystic. In Yazidi tradition, Dhū'l-Nūn's spiritual initiation into the faith is commemorated by his receiving of the sacred woolen robe (Xerqe/Kharqa) associated with Sheikh 'Adī. According to the narrative, Dhū'l-Nūn was a pious ruler in Egypt who fell madly in love with a woman named Khazal after seeing her naked. Realizing his worldly lust was a betrayal of his divine devotion, he blinded himself with a knife out of remorse. Khazal, who had also fallen in love with him, began to weep and blame herself for his misfortune and, taking a knife, also blinded herself. His spiritual brother, Emir Ibrahim, miraculously restored the sight of both through prayer. To overcome his earthly passions, Dhū'l-Nūn renounced his wealth, donned the dervish robe, and began wandering the world. When Khazal encountered him again, he explained that his love for her had served as a path leading him toward mystical love for God. Inspired by his transformation, Khazal dedicated herself to God as a righteous woman, eventually guiding 40 dervishes through a 40-day blizzard to Lalish to seek the blessing of Sheikh 'Adī.

=== Mystical Significance ===
Scholars note that the allegory of Dhū'l-Nūn and Khazal represents core mystical themes: overcoming carnal desire (şahwet) and accepting suffering as a prerequisite for attaining divine love. The presence of these narratives and classical Sufi terminology in Yazidi oral texts demonstrates the deep historical ties and shared mystical roots between early, unformalized Sufism and the formative period of Yazidism.

== See also ==
- List of Sufi saints
- List of Sufis
