= Hal (Sufism) =

Sufi concept

A ḥāl (Arabic: حَال, meaning "state" or "condition", sometimes anglicized as haal; plural أَحْوَال aḥwāl, sometimes anglicized as ahwaal) is a special-purpose, temporary state of consciousness, generally understood to be the product of a Sufi's spiritual practices while on his way toward God.

== Overview ==
A ḥāl is by nature transient and one should not attempt to prolong it. It results from psychological or spiritual influences which affect the man during his progress towards God. Related concepts are ecstasy (wajd), annihilation (istilam), happiness (bast), despondency (qabd), awakening (sahû), intoxication (sukr), etc. They arise like flashes on the horizon, blinding flashes of lightning which disappear immediately. However, these stages are necessary for the liberating experience of Man; thanks to them he may distinguish the contingent from the consciousness anything, except that which is destined to endure. According to Ibn Arabi, Fanaa (al-fanâ) (extinction) is the apex of the aḥwāl.

== Ḥāl in Sufism ==
Since aḥwāl are considered in Sufism to be gifts from God, there is nothing on the part of human beings that can be done to ensure that they are granted, for man is merely the receiver. Yet, unlike material gifts exchanged among men, man cannot do anything to avoid experiencing these special states. No prerequisites have been determined for man to receive any particular ḥāl since it has been noted that even the unreligious occasionally experience states that have been granted by God. The explanation given for this phenomenon follows from the idea that there is an overabundance of divine grace and, thus, it must necessarily come into contact with nonbelievers at times. Likewise, those that are in the early stages of their spirituality may experience aḥwāl just as much as the more advanced Sufis.

When enduring a particular ḥāl, such as that of ecstasy, one must note that only those who have already experienced that state can truly comprehend what it is like. As well, for the one experiencing a state of ecstasy to be understood, only those that are in a similar state will understand what is being said. This also applies to one's work, since someone who is viewing a piece of art or reading a particular passage must be in the same ḥāl as the creator was at the time of work's creation. Failing to do this will only result in a lack of understanding between the creator and his audience.

It is generally thought that aḥwāl are only experienced intermittently for a short time, but others such as Abd al-Karīm ibn Hawāzin Qushayri argue that each state is continuous, and that there is a necessary succession from one state to the other. For him, once a state has been granted by God, man maintains that state, or condition, until he has been given a new state that is spiritually higher than the previous. Others would argue that his definition of a state actually pertains to a station or spiritual stage (maqām) which is a completely separate notion in Sufism as, in contrast to a ḥāl, it is usually not granted by God but only achieved on the basis of individual merit and efforts. His reason for making this claim, however, comes from a hadith given by Muhammad, as well as an explanation of that hadith from Abu Ali ad-Daqqaq. The passage is written as follows:

My heart becomes shrouded, so that I ask God Most High for pardon seventy times a day. In regard to this hadith, I hears Abu 'Ali ad-Daqqaq, God's mercy upon him, say: “The prophet (God’s mercy and blessings upon him) was continually rising in his states. When he rose from one condition (ḥāla) to a higher one, he might glance at the condition he has risen beyond, and he would count it as a covering or shroud in relationship to what he had attained. His states were continually being intensified."

Given this passage from Muhammad, it would appear that Qushayrī is correct in making his claim, but many Sufis still consider each state to come and go like a flash of lightning. Still others would claim that while most aḥwāl are short-lived, the more advanced aḥwāl can remain with man for a longer period of time.

=== Important aḥwāl ===
==== Ḥāl of murāqaba (watching) ====
This ḥāl is one in which its receiver can experience a feeling of joy or of fear depending on which aspect of God has been revealed to him.

==== Ḥāl of qurb (nearness) ====
Experiencing this ḥāl causes one to lose consciousness of his acts, and to concentrate only on the acts of God. The spirits of Awliaa' Allah (Friends of God) are able to give their qurb and suhbat to the seekers of God either while living or having left this world. Their attention towards the salik (seeker) or student causes the state of estacsy (wajd), but if someone gets control it's better and more fruitful.

==== Ḥāl of wajd (ecstasy) ====
A state that is described by its opposites, as the one experiencing it can feel either fear or love, sorrow or joy, or contentment or restlessness.

==== Ḥāl of sukr (intoxication) ====
Followed by a ḥāl of ṣahw (sobriety), this state is characterized by an association with God that inhibits man from being fully aware of his surroundings.

==== Ḥāl of wudd (intimacy) ====
A state that includes a feeling of awe coupled with content from the divine presence that fills the receiver's heart.

=== Other aḥwāl ===
Additional aḥwāl found in Sufism include: grief, expansion, vexation, contraction, or need.

== Distinction from maqām ==
Generally in Sufism there is a clear distinction between the various aḥwāl given by God and the Sufi term for a stage, maqām. The main difference between the two terms is the idea that a ḥāl is a gift from God, and cannot be sought after, whereas a maqām is only attained through rigorous spiritual practice. In this way, a maqām is something that can be pursued and whose attainment relies heavily on the actions of man. As well, once one has achieved a particular station, they remain in that station until they have moved onto a higher one; thus making it more permanent than the different aḥwāl that man can experience.

== Ḥāl outside Sufism ==
Outside the realm of Sufism, the term ḥāl is used more generally in Arabic and Persian to describe any positive experience of one's soul that transcends reality. In other words, it could be thought of as a state in which man has an unexplained feeling. In this sense such states are not necessarily linked with a divine experience, or encounter, and they are always desired states.

=== Ḥāl in the Persian arts ===
As the Persian use of a ḥāl simply constitutes a leaving of one's normal consciousness, it maintains a great importance when speaking of Persian art, both musically and visually. In fact, it has become so common in among Persian artists that it is now used synonymously with an artist's ability to achieve authenticity (eṣālat). It is therefore possible for one to make the statement that an artist ‘has ḥāl’, ‘plays with ḥāl’, or even that he is ‘experiencing his own ḥāl.’ Especially in Persian music ḥāl is significant because musicians tend to follow the notion that the harmonies and melodies found in their works are able to bring a listener from one state to another. Reaching certain states also allows the musician himself to perform a piece exactly as it was originally written, either by him or someone else. This idea is heavily based on the Sufi use of the term, though it does not follow it strictly.

== Resources ==
- Theophanies and Lights in the Thought of Ibn 'Arabi
