= Abu Hafs Amr Haddad =

Abu Hafs 'Amr ibn Salama al-Haddad

Personal life
- Born: Nishapur, Persia
- Died: 879 Nishapur, Persia
- Known for: Sufi mystic, blacksmith
- Occupation: Blacksmith

Religious life
- Religion: Islam
- Denomination: Sufism
- School: Baghdad School

Senior posting
- Influenced by: Junayd of Baghdad Abu Bakr al-Shibli

Abu Hafs 'Amr ibn Salama al-Haddad, commonly known as Abu Hafs Amr Haddad, was a sufi and blacksmith from Nishapur. He lived during the 9th century and died in 879 AD. His profession as a blacksmith earned him the title "al-Haddad," which means "the blacksmith."

== Spiritual journey and encounters ==
Abu Hafs Amr Haddad's spiritual journey began in earnest after an encounter with a Jew who converted him to Sufism. He subsequently visited Baghdad, where he encountered several notable mystics of the Baghdad school, including Junayd of Baghdad and Abu Bakr al-Shibli.

=== Relationship with Al-Junaid and other mystics ===
During his time in Baghdad, Abu Hafs met and earned the admiration of al-Junaid, one of the most prominent Sufi scholars of the time. Al-Junaid was impressed by Abu Hafs's devotion and spiritual practices. Abu Hafs also encountered other mystics, such as al-Shebli, further enriching his spiritual experience.

=== Return to Nishapur ===
After his time in Baghdad, Abu Hafs returned to Nishapur. There, he continued his spiritual practices and teachings, leaving a lasting impact on the local Sufi community. His eloquence in Arabic and his deep spiritual insights amazed his fellow Sufis.

== Death ==
Abu Hafs Amr Haddad died in 879 AD.
