= Muhammad lbn Wasi' al-Azdi =

Muhammad Ibn Wasi' Al-Azdi (660-740) was a tabi'i Islamic scholar of hadith, judge, and soldier who was noted for his asceticism (zuhd). His statement, 'I never saw anything without seeing Allah therein' was much discussed by later Sufis. He fought under Qutaybah Ibn Muslim (d.715) during the Umayyad conquest of Transoxiana, and later became a judge.

There is a story that claims that a Muslim saw in a dream Malik Bin Deenar and Ibn Wasi being led into Jannah, and noticed that Malik was more honoured and allowed to enter first. When he enquired, noting that he believed Ibn Wasi' was the more noble, he was told that it was true, "but Mohammed ibn Wasi possessed two shirts, and Malik only one. That is the reason why Malik is preferred".

== Sayings about or attributed to Ibn Wasi' ==
Qutaybah Ibn Muslim said of him, "That the finger of Muhammad ibn Wasi' points to the sky in battle is more beloved to me than one hundred thousand renowned swords and strong youths." Abu Hamid Al-Ghazali (d. 1111) also mentioned him in his writings: If a man finds himself sluggish and averse from austerity and self-discipline, he should consort with one who is a proficient in such practices so as to catch the contagion of his enthusiasm. One saint used to say, "When I grow lukewarm in self-discipline, I look at Muhammad Ibn Wasi, and the sight of him rekindles my fervour for at least a week." Muhammad ibn Wasi said; “Only three things do I wish for in this world; a brother to set me straight if I go crooked; a livelihood for, which I do not have to beg; and a congregational prayer in, which I am relieved of absent mindedness and, which is recorded in my favor.”
