= Abu Sa'id al-Kharraz =

Abū Sa‘īd al-Kharrāz (Arabic: أبو سعيد الخراز), also known as "the Cobbler", was a pseudonym of Aḥmad bin ‘Īsā. He was an Arab native of Baghdad. He had a devotion toward Sufism, and so went to Egypt and resided piously by the Ka‘bah. His profession was that of a shoemaker, and he was a disciple of Muḥammad bin Manṣūr al-Ṭūsī. He associated with Dhū al-Nūn al-Miṣrī, al-Sarī al-Saqaṭī, Abū ‘Ubayd al-Baṣrī, and Bishr bin al-Ḥārith, and derived much spiritual instruction from them.

To him is attributed the formulation of the mystical doctrine of passing away (from human attributes) and continuance (in God). He was the author of several books, some of which have survived. The date of his death is uncertain, but probably was between 279 A.H. (890 AD) and 286 (899).

He was the first person to speak of the states of “passing-away” (fanā’) and “continuance” (baqā’) in the mystical sense, summing up his whole doctrine in these two terms.

== Among his works ==
- Kitāb al-Ṣidq (The Book of Truthfulness): A description of the moral qualities a sincere Muslim must acquire if he “hopes to meet his Lord.” An English translation by A.J. Arberry.
- Rasā’il al-Kharrāz (The Writings of al-Kharrāz): A collection of 6 books: Kitāb al-Ṣafā’ (The Book of Purity), Kitāb al-Ḍiyā’ (The Book of Light), Kitāb al-Kashf wa al-Bayān (The Book of Revelation and Exposition), Kitāb al-Farāgh (The Book of Emptiness), Kitāb al-Ḥaqā’iq (The Book of Realities), and Kitab al-Sirr (The Book of the Secret).
