= Shaqiq al-Balkhi =

Afghan Sufi scholar and saint (died 910)

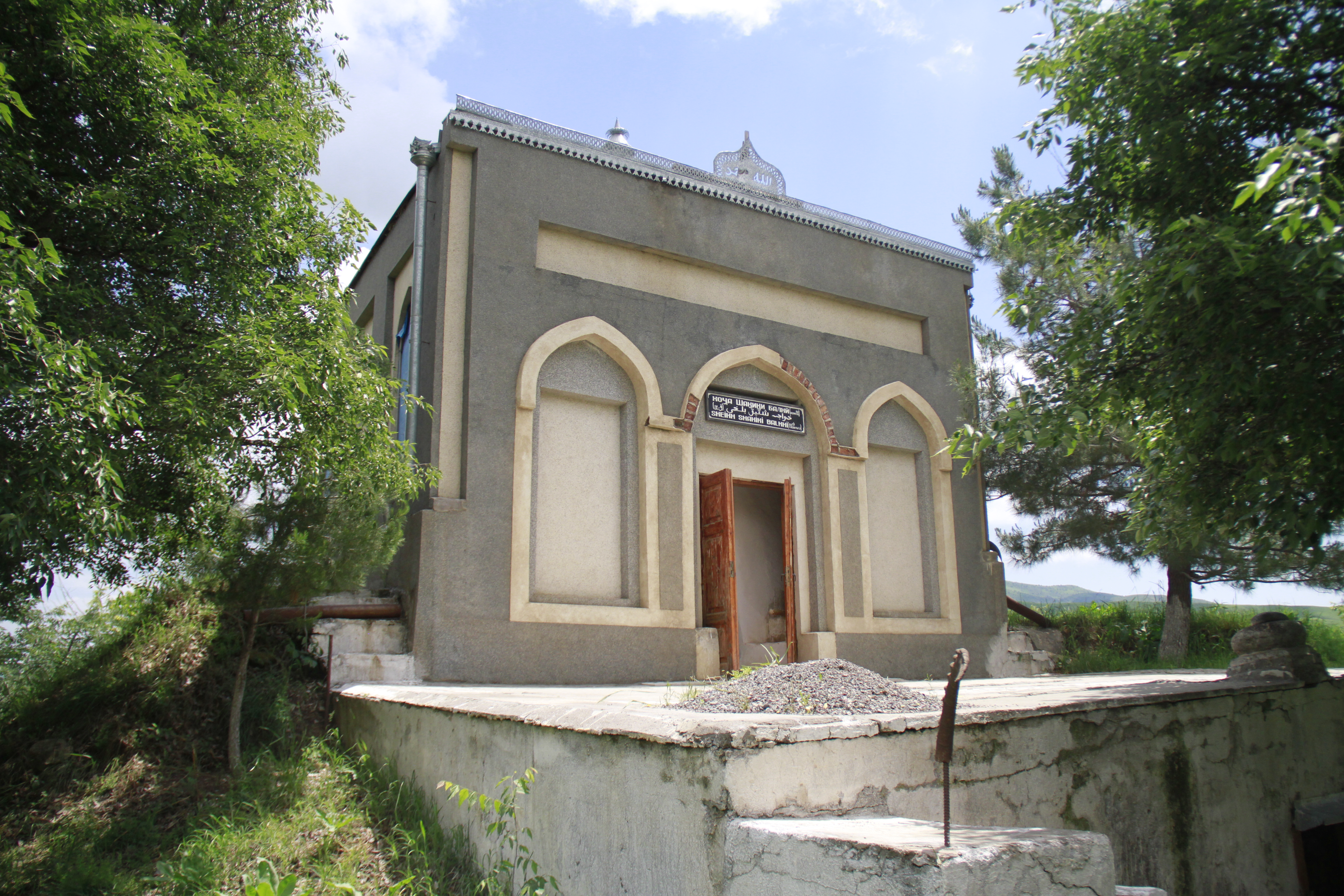
- Born: 8th Century; Balkh
- Died: 810 CE
- Venerated in: Islam
- Influences: Ibrahim ibn Adham, Rabia Basri
- Influenced: Hatim al Assam and Other saints in Basra

Shaqiq al-Balkhi (Arabic: شقيق البلخي; d. 810 / AH 194) was an early Sufi saint of the Khorasan school. Tradition makes him the disciple of Ibrahim ibn Adham. He emphasized the importance of tawakkul or reliance upon God. Some sources state he was a teacher of Bayazid Bastami.

He was a student of Abu Hanifa and a lifelong companion of his classmate and later Abbasid chief justice Abu Yusuf.
