= Bayazid Bastami =

9th-century Persian Sufi mystic

Bāyazīd Basṭāmī
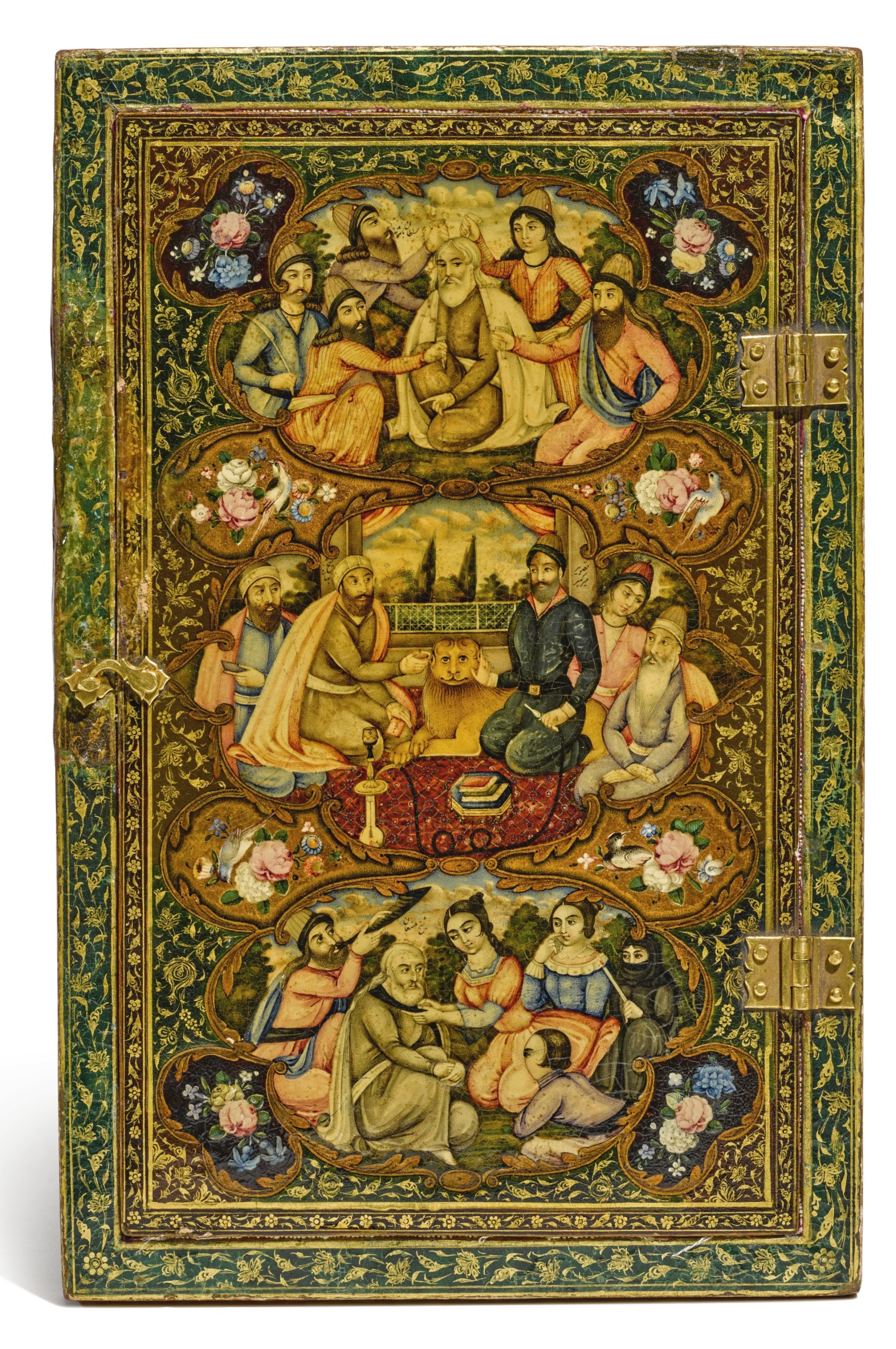
- Cover from a lacquer mirror case with multiple scenes, attributed to Mohammad Esmail Esfahani; the top scene depicts Bayazid Bastami and disciples. Created in Qajar Iran in the second half of the 19th century
- Born: 804 CE; Bastam, Qumis region, Abbasid Caliphate (modern Bastam, Semnan Province, Iran)
- Died: 874 CE; Bastam, Kumis area, Abbasid Caliphate (Present-day Semnan province of Iran)

Philosophical work
- Era: Abbasid Era (Islamic Golden Age)
- Region: Western Asia
- School: Sunni Sufi Naqshbandi
- Main interests: Mysticism, Philosophy
- Notable ideas: Sukr (see→)

Bāyazīd Basṭāmī, (Note: Full name: Bayazīd Ṭayfūr bin ʿĪsā bin Surūshān al-Bisṭāmī Persian: بایزید بسطامی) (d. 875), commonly known as the Sultān-ul-Ārifīn (King of Those Who Know) (Note: Sultān-ul-Ārifīn) was a Persian Sufi who became famous for his bold articulation of fanāʾ–the Sufi notion of self-annhilation.

Abu Ali al-Sindhi, a Buddhist convert from Sindh, was one of the tutors of Bayazid al-Basṭāmī, and he taught him the concept of fanaa.

Many "ecstatic utterances" (شطحات shatˤħāt) have been attributed to Basṭāmī, which lead to him being known as the "drunken" or "ecstatic" (Arabic: سُكْر, sukr) school of Islamic mysticism. Such utterance may be argued as Basṭāmī dying with mystical union and the deity speaking through his tongue. Bisṭāmī also claimed to have ascended through the seven heavens in his dream. His journey, known as the Mi'raj of Basṭāmī, is clearly patterned on the Mi'raj of the Islamic prophet Muhammad. Basṭāmī is characterized in three different ways: a free thinking radical, a pious Sufi who is deeply concerned with following the shari'a and engaging in "devotions beyond the obligatory," and a pious individual who is presented as having a dream similar to the Mi'raj of Muhammad. The Mi'raj of Bisṭāmī seems as if Bisṭāmī is going through a self journey; as he ascends through each heaven, Basṭāmī is gaining knowledge in how he communicates with the angels (e.g. languages and gestures) and the number of angels he encounters increases.

His grandfather, Surūshān, was born a Zoroastrian, an indication that Basṭāmī had Persian heritage, despite the fact that his transmitted sayings are in Arabic. Very little is known about the life of Basṭāmī, whose importance lies in his biographical tradition, since he left no written works. The early biographical reports portray him as a wanderer but also as the leader of teaching circles. The early biographers describe him as a mystic who dismissed excessive asceticism; but who was also scrupulous about ritual purity, to the point of washing his tongue before chanting God's names. He also appreciated the work of the great jurists. A measure that shows how influential his image remains in posterity is the fact that he is named in the lineage (silsila) of one of the largest Sufi brotherhoods today, the Naqshbandi order.

== Background ==
The name Bastami means "from Bastam". Bayazid's grandfather, Sorūshān, was a Zoroastrian who converted to Islam. His grandfather had three sons, who were named: Adam, İsa and Ali. All of them were ascetics. Bayazid was the son of İsa. Not much is known of Bayazid's childhood, but he spent most of his time isolated in his house, and the mosque. Although he remained in isolation from the material world, he did not isolate himself from the Sufi realm. He welcomed people into his house to discuss Islam. Like his father and uncles, Bayazid led a life of asceticism and renounced all worldly pleasures in order to be one with Allah The Exalted. Ultimately, this led Bayazid to a state of "self union" which, according to many Sufi orders, is the only state a person could be in order to attain unity with God.

== Influence ==
Bastami's predecessor Dhul-Nun al-Misri (d. CE 859) was a murid "initiate" as well. Al-Misri had formulated the doctrine of ma'rifa (gnosis), presenting a system which helped the murid and the sheikh (guide) to communicate. Bayazid Bastami took this a step further and emphasized the importance of religious ecstasy in Islam, referred to in his words as drunkenness (Sukr or wajd), a means of self-annihilation in the Divine Presence of the Creator. Before him, the Sufi path was mainly based on piety and obedience and he played a major role in placing the concept of divine love at the core of Sufism.

He was known to have studied with Shaqiq al-Balkhi when he was younger.

When Bayazid died, he was over seventy years old. Before he died, someone asked him his age. He said: "I am four years old. For seventy years, I was veiled. I got rid of my veils only four years ago."

Bayazid died in 874 CE and is likely buried in Bistam. There is also a shrine in Kirikhan, Turkey in the name of Bayazid Bastami. His corpus of writings is minimal when compared to his influence. His ascetic approach to religious studies emphasizes his sole devotion to the almighty.

== Shrine in Chittagong, Bangladesh ==
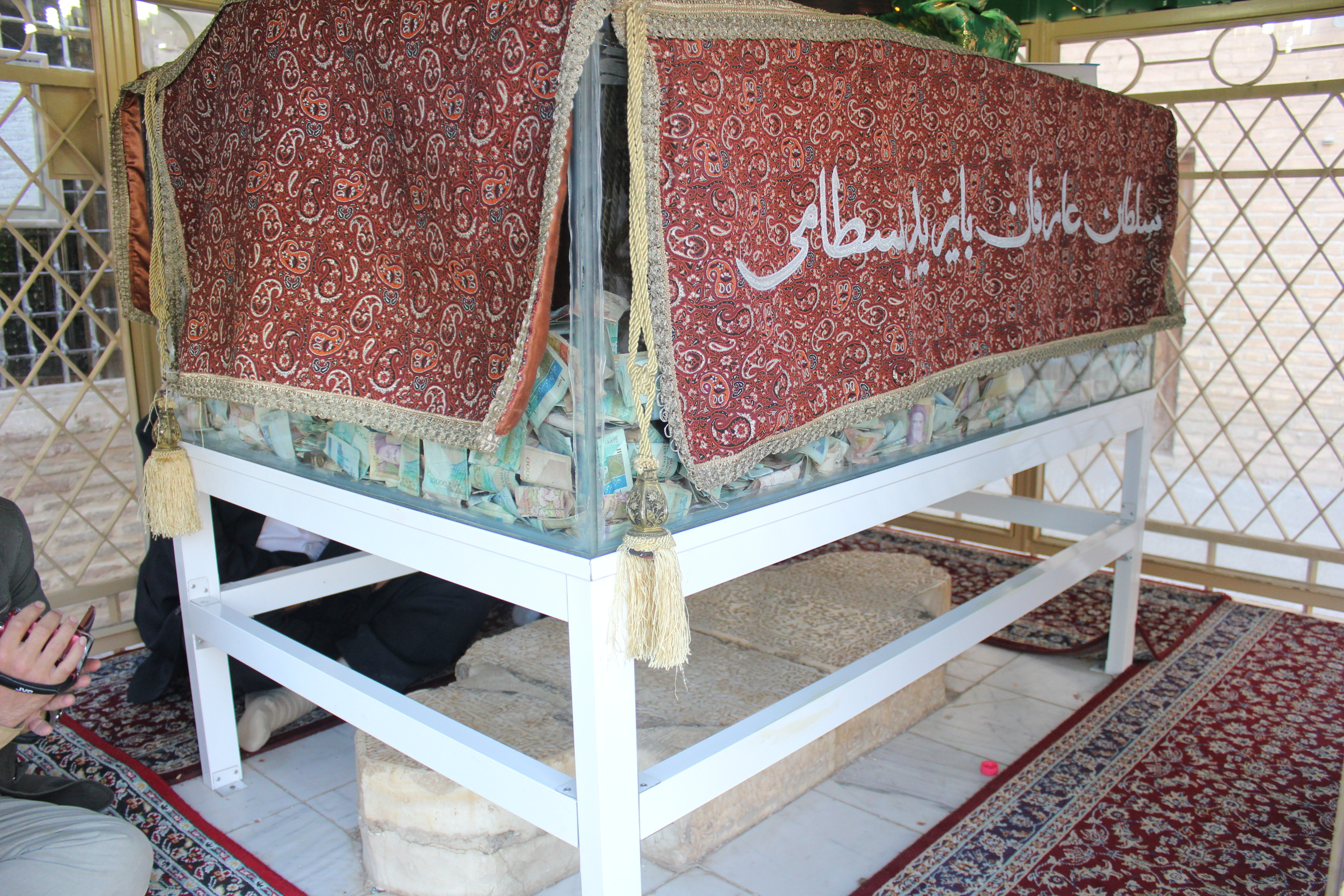
Tomb of Bayazid Bastami in Bastam near Shahroud.

Bastami's tomb is a Sufi shrine in Chittagong, Bangladesh, dating back to 850. Chittagong was a major port on the southern silk route connecting India, China and the Middle East, and the first Muslims to travel to China used the Chittagong-Burma-Sichuan trade route. Chittagong was a religious city and also a center of Sufism and Muslim merchants in the subcontinent since the 9th century, and Bayazid visited the port city around the middle of the 9th century.

== Gallery ==
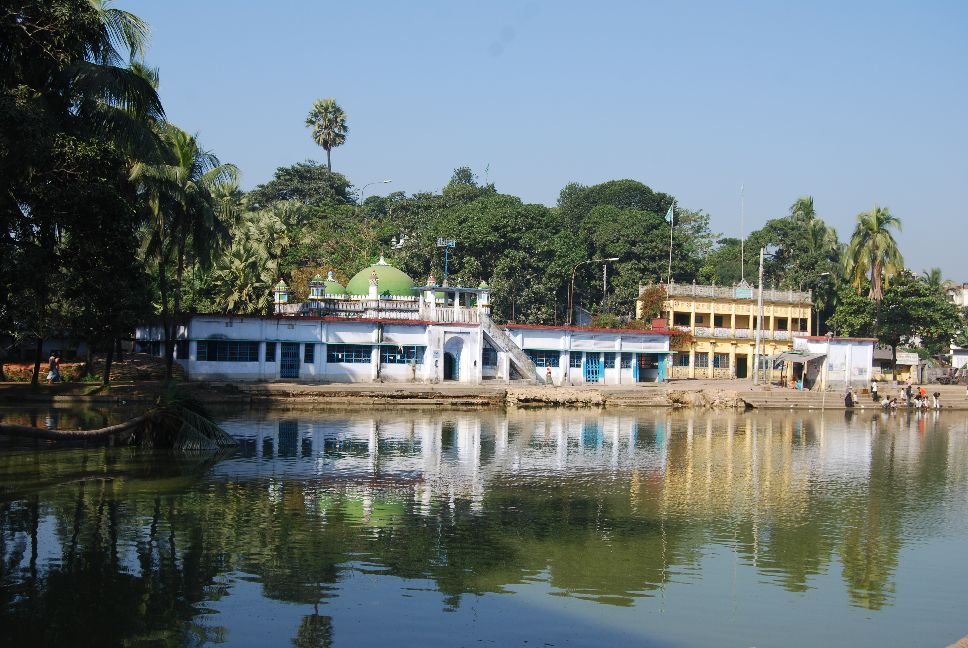
Bayazid Bastami's shrine in Chittagong, Bangladesh

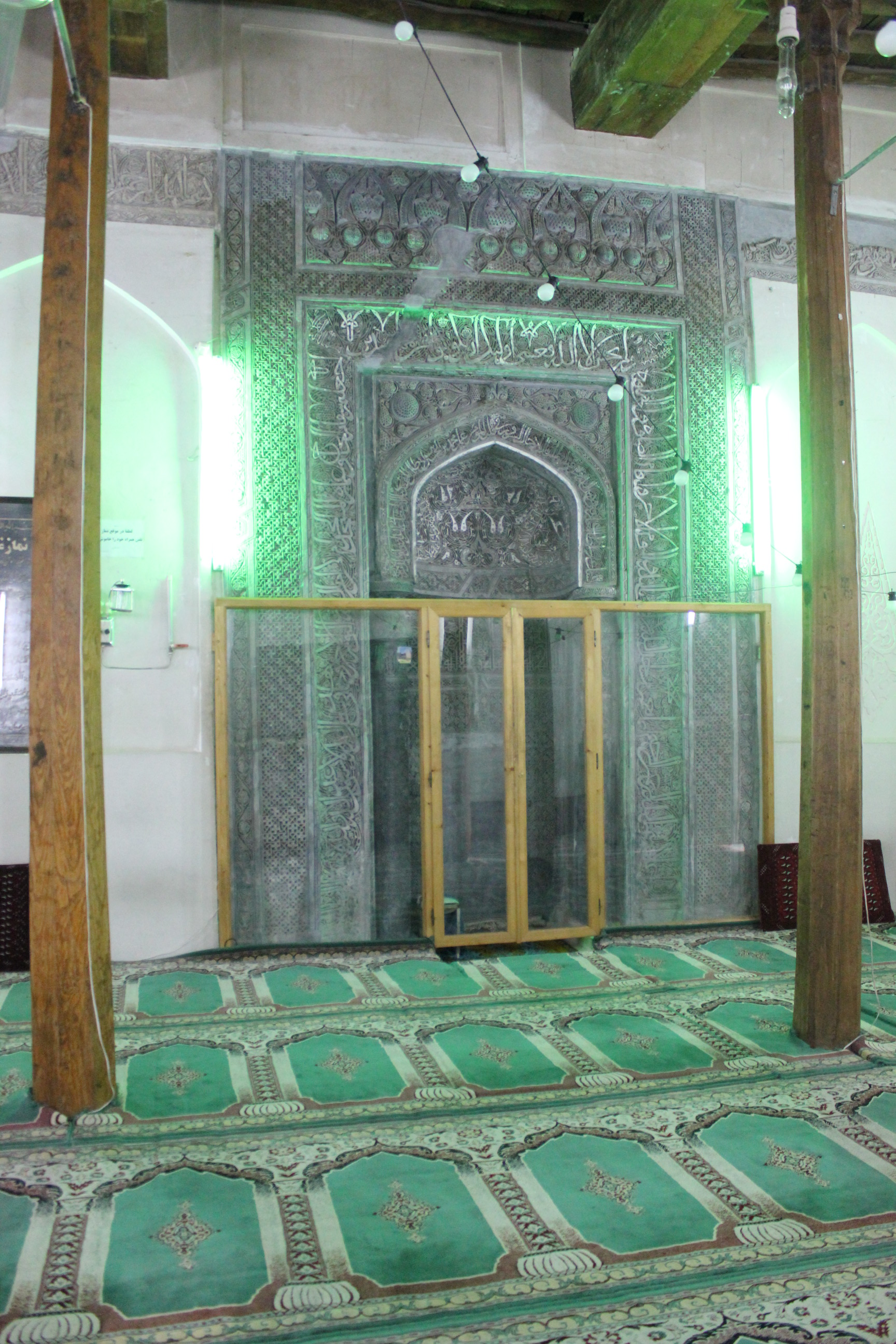
Interior of Bayazid's Mosque

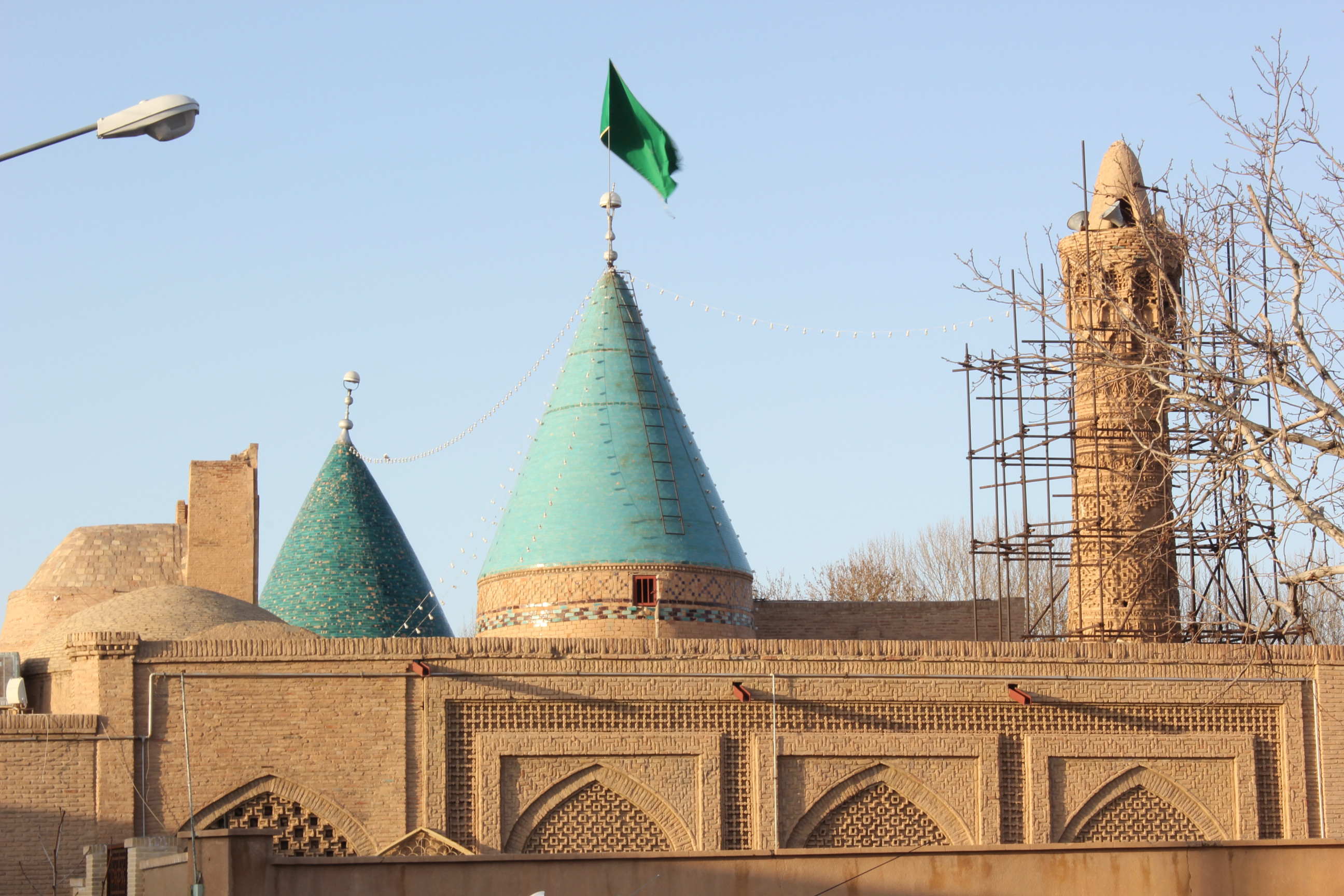
Dome of Bayazid's Mosque

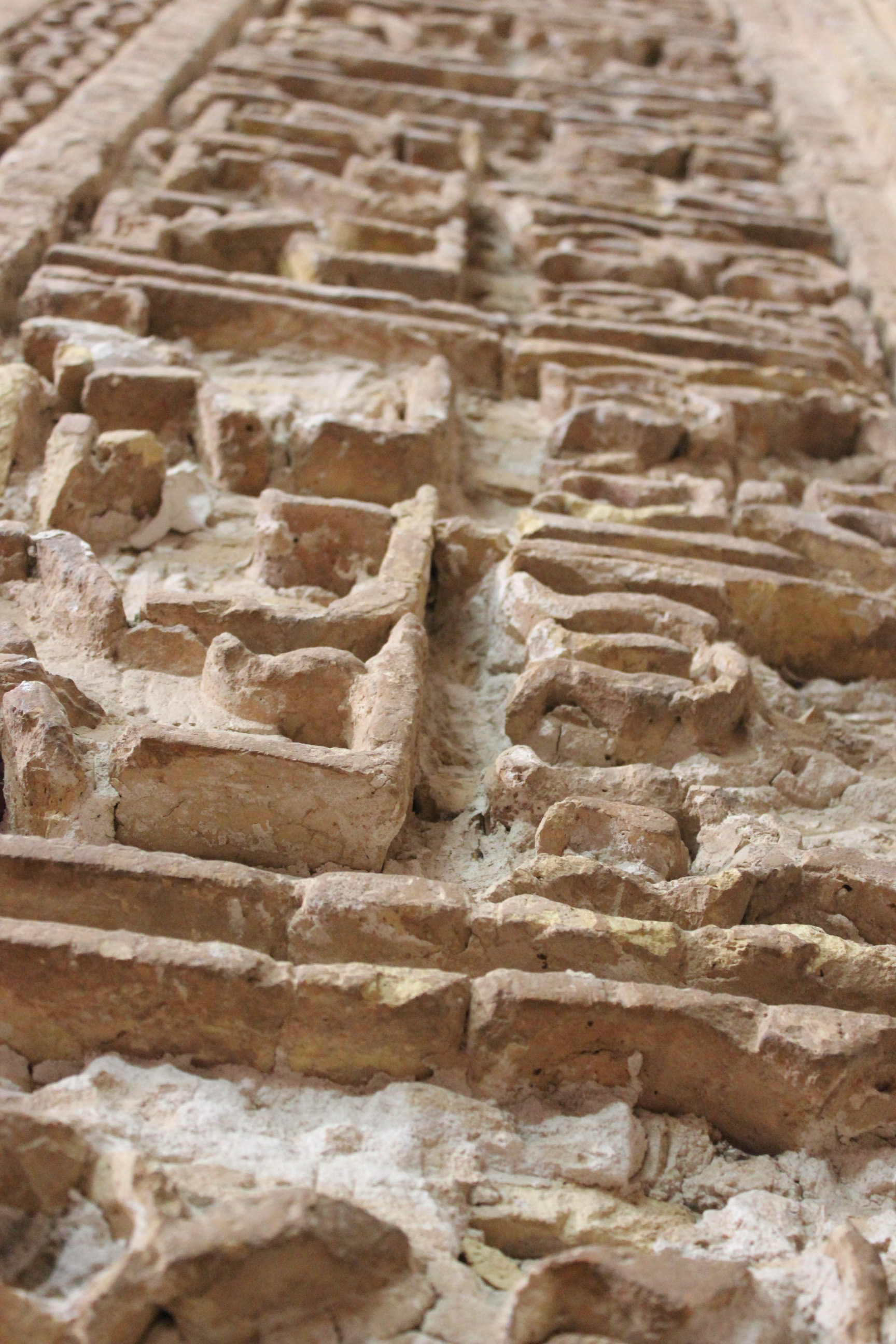
Carving of Bayazid's Mosque
