= Ibrahim ibn Adham =

Arab Sufi saint (718–782)

Ibrahim ibn Adham (إبراهيم بن أدهم)
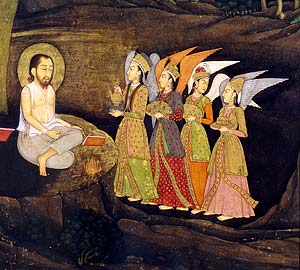
- A miniature depicting Sultan Ibrahim ibn Adham of Balkh visited by angels, 1760-70.

Mystic
- Born: Ibrahim ibn Mansour ibn Zayd ibn Jabir Al-'Ijli c. 718; Balkh
- Died: c. 782
- Venerated in: Islam
- Major shrine: Mosque of Sultan Ibrahim Ibn Adham, Jableh, Syria
- Influences: Al-Fuḍayl ibn ʻIyāḍ
- Influenced: Khwaja Sadid ad-Din Huzaifa al-Marashi, Shaqiq al-Balkhi

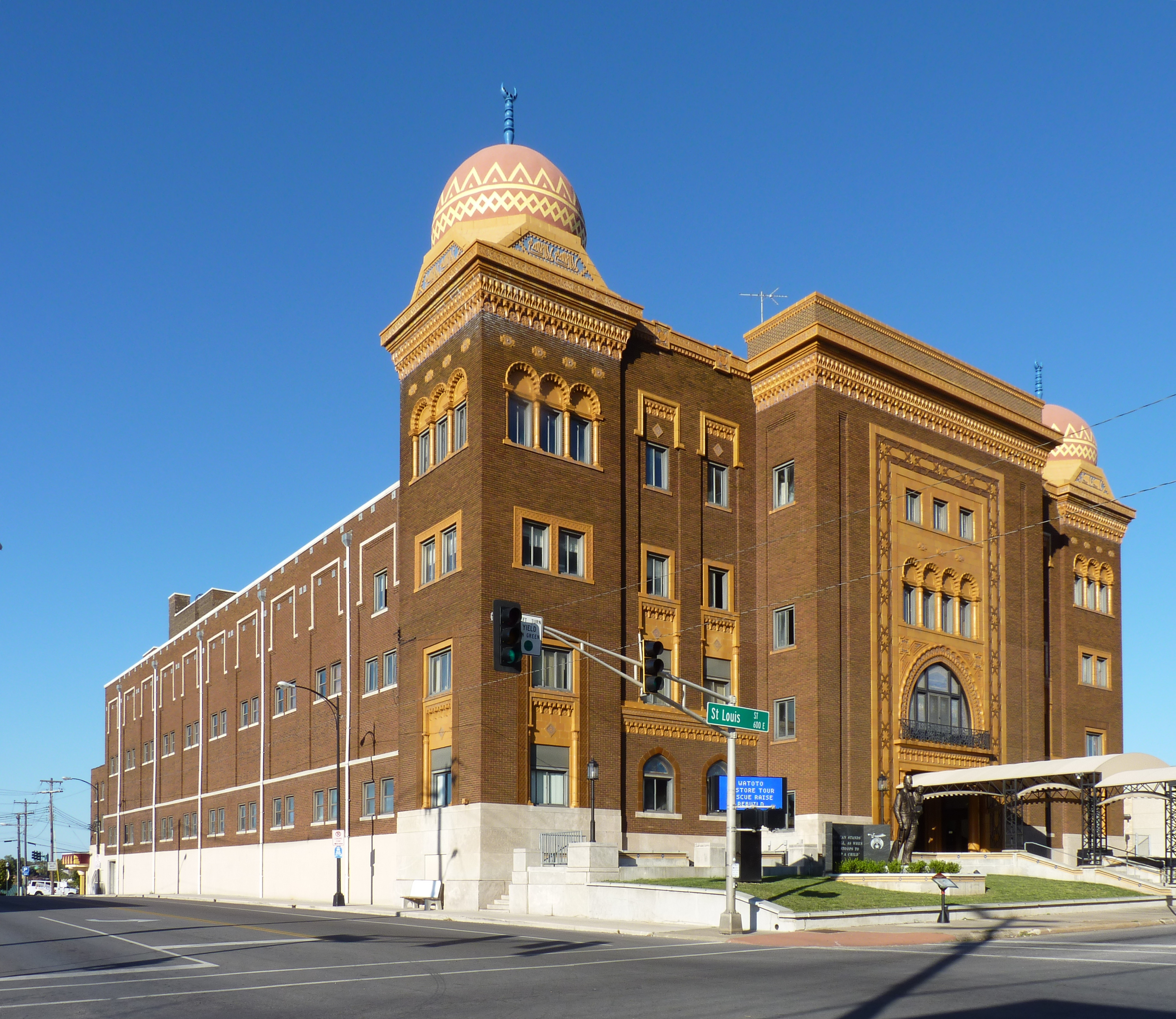
Abou Ben Adhem Shrine Mosque, United States

Ibrahim ibn Adham (Arabic: إبراهيم بن أدهم); also called Ibrahim al-Balkhi and Ebrahim-e Adham (Persian: ابراهیم ادهم); c. 718 – c. 782 / AH c. 100 – c. 165 is one of the most prominent of the early Sufi saints known for his zuhd (asceticism).

The story of his conversion is one of the most celebrated in Sufi legend, mentioned in the Tazkirat al-Awliya of Attar of Nishapur. Sufi tradition ascribes to Ibrahim countless acts of righteousness and a humble lifestyle, which contrasted sharply with his early life as the king of Balkh. As recounted by Abu Nu'aym al-Isfahani, Ibrahim emphasized the importance of stillness and meditation for asceticism. Rumi extensively described the legend of Ibrahim in his Masnavi. The most famous of Ibrahim's students is Shaqiq al-Balkhi (d. 810).

== Life ==
Ibrahim was born in Balkh, in present-day Afghanistan. Historical and academic sources establish that his family was of Arab descent, tracing their lineage to the tribes of Banu Tamim or Banu Ijl, having migrated from Kufa to settle in the region. In Sufi hagiographies, he is widely celebrated as the ruler or king of Balkh who dramatically renounced his throne to pursue a life of asceticism. According to traditional accounts, he was maternally descended from the second Rashidun caliph, Umar. Accounts of Ibrahim's life are recorded by medieval authors such as ibn Asakir and Muhammad al-Bukhari.

In Sufi hagiographies, Ibrahim is widely celebrated as the ruler of Balkh who dramatically abandoned his throne to become an ascetic. Legend states he received a warning from God through Khidr, who appeared to him twice, prompting him to abdicate and take up an ascetic life in Syria. Migrating around 750 CE, he lived the rest of his life as a semi-nomad, often traveling as far south as Gaza. Ibrahim abhorred begging and worked tirelessly for his livelihood, frequently grinding grain or tending orchards. He is also recorded as having engaged in military operations on the border with Byzantium, and his death is said to have occurred during one of these naval expeditions.

Sufi hagiographies often recount Ibrahim's encounters with various figures who imparted moral lessons on his path to asceticism. One such celebrated dialogue occurred with a Christian monk named Simeon, from whom Ibrahim drew a lesson in spiritual endurance. Ibrahim recounted this encounter to illustrate the value of persistence:

I visited him in his cell, and said to him, "Father Simeon, how long hast thou been here?" "For seventy years," he answered. "What is thy food?" I asked. "O Hanifite," he countered, "what hast caused thee to ask this?" "I wanted to know," I replied. Then he said. "Every night, one chickpea." I said, "What stirs thee in thy heart so that this pea suffices thee?" He answered, "They come to me one day in every year and adorn my cell and process about it, so doing me reverence; and whenever my spirit wearies of worship, I remind it of that hour, and endure the labors of a year for the sake of an hour. Do thou, O Hanifite, endure the labor of a year for the glory of eternity."

Regarding his formal spiritual training within the Islamic tradition, records such as those of the Chishti Order note that he was taught by early Muslim ascetics, most notably al-Fuḍayl ibn ʻIyāḍ.

== Purported graves ==
As is often with the graves of saints, numerous locations have been placed as the burial place of Ibrahim ibn Adham. Ibn Asakir stated that Ebrahim was buried on a Byzantine island, While other sources state his tomb is in Tyre, in Baghdad, in the "city of the prophet Lot," in the "cave of Jeremiah" in Jerusalem and, in the city of Jablah on the Syrian coast, where a mosque bearing his name is located (35.3626975, 35.9244253). However, in the city of Sur in the Sultanate of Oman, a small shrine is a place of pilgrimage (22.5528326, 59.5295567).

== Namesakes ==
Among the later namesakes of Ibrahim ibn Adham, one tradition in Bengal speaks of a figure known as Hazrat Ibrahim Adham who settled in the Dacca region in 281 AH (894 CE), particularly around Azimpur in Old Dhaka, where local accounts associate him with an ancient mosque and mazar (mausoleum).

The medieval narratives of the life of Ibrahim are semi-historical. Ibrahim may have been a historical Sufi of the 8th century whose legend was embellished in later accounts. Early Arabic biographical dictionaries and historical texts, such as those by Abu Nu'aym al-Isfahani, Al-Sulami, and Ibn Asakir, preserved the foundational anecdotes of his life, teachings, and asceticism.

These early foundational accounts were later expanded into elaborate hagiographies and poetic narratives within Persian literature. Attar of Nishapur's Tazkirat al-Awliya and Rumi's Masnavi remain among the most prominent sources detailing the legendary embellishments of his conversion and early life as the king of Balkh. Through this extensive Persian literary tradition, narratives about Ibrahim passed into the Islamic literature of South and Southeast Asia, inspiring biographies in Urdu, Awadhi, and Malay, which laid the basis for short biographies in Javanese and Sundanese.

English poet Leigh Hunt's poem "Abou Ben Adhem" is a story of Ibrahim ibn Adham. In turn, the musical Flahooley features a genie named Abou Ben Atom, played in the original 1951 Broadway production by Irwin Corey.

== See also ==
- List of Sufis
- Khwaja Sadid ad-Din Huzaifa al-Marashi
- Sultan Ibrahim Ibn Adham Mosque
- Beit Hanina
- Abou Ben Adhem Shrine Mosque
- Abou Ben Adhem (poem)
