= Rabia Basri =

Female Sufi scholar and saint (died 801)

Rābiʼa al-ʼAdawiyya al-Qaysiyya
- رابعة العدوية القيسية
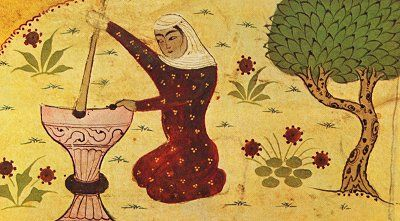
- Depiction of Rabiʼa grinding grain from a Persian dictionary
- Born: between 714 and 718 CE
- Died: 801 CE

Academic background
- Influences: Hasan of Basra

Academic work
- Era: Islamic Golden Age; (Umayyad and Abbasid era)
- Main interests: Asceticism, divine love
- Notable ideas: Divine love

Rābiʼa al-ʼAdawiyya al-Qaysiyya (Arabic: رابعة العدوية القيسية; c. 716 – 801 CE) or Rabia Basri was a poet, one of the earliest Sufi mystics and an influential religious figure from Basra. Her kunya was Umm ʿAmr (or Umm al-Khayr), her wilāya was al-ʿAtakiyyah, and her nisba was al-ʿAdawiyya or al-Qaysīyya because she was a freed slave of the tribe of Qays ibn ʿAdī. She is regarded as one of the three preeminent Qalandars of the world.

== Biography ==
Very little is known about the life of Rabi'a, notes Rkia Elaroui Cornell.

What historical information can be ascertained from the earliest sources on Rabi'a? As stated above, there is very little except to confirm that a Muslim woman ascetic and teacher named Rabi'a al-'Adawiyya or Rabi'a al-Qaysiyya (the name 'Adawiyya refers to her clan and the name Qaysiyya refers to her tribe) lived in or around the city of Basra in southern Iraq in the eighth century CE. [...] The commonly accepted birth date of 717 CE and death date of 801 CE come from a much later period and the ultimate source of these dates is unclear.

Cornell further notes that she was mentioned by two early Basran authors. "Because of this, they were familiar with her reputation. This local reputation is the best empirical evidence we have that Rabi'a actually existed." She also writes, "To date, no written body of work has been linked conclusively to Rabi'a al-'Adawiyya."

Despite this, narratives about Rabiʿa grew over the centuries, and a considerable hagiography developed. Attar of Nishapur, a Sufi saint and poet who lived some four centuries later, recounted a now-famous story of her early life. Many of her hagiographies depict her using literary or philosophical tropes where she, like her Christian counterparts, embodied idealized religious individuals.

According to Margaret Smith, she is said to have died in Basra in 185 AH/801 CE. Others report that she passed around 180 AH, at about 80 years old.

In his work, Dhikr al-niswat al-mutaʿabbidāt al-ṣūfiyyāt (pp. 27, 54, 59), Sulamī mentions two other female Sufis with the same name besides Rābiʿa al-ʿAdawiyya. One of them is Rābiʿa al-Azdiyya from Basra, the wife of ʿAbd al-Wāḥid b. Zayd (d. 177/793), one of the famous Sufis of the time, and the other is Aḥmad b. Abū al-Ḥawārī's wife was Rābiʿa bint Ismāʿīl of Damascus (d. 228/844). The existence of three different Rābiʿas in the same period has led to conflicting information about Rābiʿa al-ʿAdawiyya in the sources.

== Early life ==
Her father had three daughters, and Rābiʿa was the fourth. And so they called her Rābiʿa, meaning "the fourth one."

Born into a poor home, she was stolen as a child (another account narrates that her parents died and a great famine occurred in Basra, separating the sisters), and sold into slavery (she is even sometimes made into a qayna [female singer]), but her sanctity secured her freedom, and she retired to a life of seclusion, and celibacy, at first in the desert and then in Basra.

== Philosophy and religious contributions ==
Often noted as having been the single most famous woman in Islam, Rabiʿa was renowned for her high virtue and piety. A devoted ascetic, when asked why she performed a thousand ritual prostrations both during the day and at night, she is said to have answered, "I desire no reward for it; I do it so that the Messenger of God, may God bless him and give him peace, will delight in it on the day of Resurrection and say to the prophets, 'Take note of what a woman of my community has accomplished.'"

Rabiʿa was described as being intense in her self-denial and devotion to God. Explaining her refusal to lift her head toward the heavens (towards God) as an act of modesty, she's noted as having said: "Were the world the possession of a single man, it would not make him rich ... because it is passing away."

According to Sufi accounts, she was the first to set forth the doctrine of divine love known as Ishq and is widely considered as being the most important of the early renunciants, a form of piety that would eventually be labelled Sufism.

== Poetry and stories ==
Much of the poetry attributed to her is of unknown origin. There is no evidence in the historical archive that Rabia ever met Hasan al-Basri; however, the following stories, which first appeared in Attar of Nishapur's Tazkirat al-Awliya, is a common trope in the modern period: After a life of hardship, she spontaneously achieved a state of self-realization. When asked by Hasan al-Basri how she discovered the secret, she responded by stating "you know of the how, but I know of the how-less."

One of the many stories that surround her life is that she was freed from slavery because her master saw her praying while surrounded by light, realized that she was a saint and feared for his life if he continued to keep her as a slave.

Biographer Rkia Elaroui Cornell discovered four main characterizations of Rabia: Rabia the Teacher, Rabia the Ascetic, Rabia the Lover, and Rabia the Sufi.

=== Asceticism ===
Rabia is often described as being an ascetic, where "the ascetic attains the otherworldly not by rejecting the world but by treating it as unimportant. The ascetic avoids the World not because it is evil per se but because it is a distraction from God."

== Legacy ==
In a Sufi narrative, Sufi leader Hasan al-Basri explained, "I passed one whole night and day with Rabi'a ... it never passed through my mind that I was a man nor did it occur to her that she was a woman... when I saw her I saw myself as bankrupt and Rabi'a as truly sincere."

She decided to stay celibate in order to live life unlike other Muslim women of her time, and devote herself completely to God. Among her most notable qualities besides her devotion to God were her humility and celibacy. Living alone with divine love, she is adored by many for her religious passion and the example she set for the growing Muslim population. However, her importance and legacy remain prominent through tales of her life, modern references, and her standing in Muslim culture, while no physical evidence was found of her, Rabia's story and poetry remain an inspiration to women and Muslim people today.

== In popular culture ==
The life of Rabia has been the subject of several motion pictures of Turkish cinema. One of these films, Rabia, released in 1973, was directed by Osman F. Seden, and Fatma Girik played the leading role of Rabia.

Rabia, İlk Kadın Evliya (Rabia, The First Woman Saint) is another Turkish film on Rabia. It was also released in 1973 and was directed by Süreyya Duru, starring Hülya Koçyiğit.

The Indonesian song "Jika Surga dan Neraka Tak Pernah Ada" (transl. "If Heaven and Hell Never Existed") sung by Ahmad Dhnani and Chrisye on their 2004 album Senyawa, is based on Rabia's quotes about worshipping God out of love, not out of fear of punishment or desire for a reward.

Rabia appears in 2025's Civilization VII as a Great Person for the Abbasid civilization. When used on a building, +10% happiness is added to the settlement.

Spanish musician Rosalía included the phrase "Ninguna mujer pretendió ser Dios" (transl. "No woman ever claimed to be God"), attributed to Rabia Basri, inside the physical release of her 2025 album Lux. The full quote she refers to reads: "(...) women have never been so infatuated with themselves as men, nor have they ever claimed divinity." In the album's 11th track "La Yugular" she references Rabia with Arabic lyrics that refer to Rabia's wish to burn down heaven and quench the fires of hell, saying she'd do that for the divine love she has for God, for no promises or threats. The song is a deeply personal tribute to Rabia and Rosalía's journey to finding the God that's "as close to her as her jugular vein", a reference to a passage in the Quran that says the same.

== See also ==
- Zawiyat al-'Adawiyya, Jerusalem – a tomb venerated as Rabia's
- Rabaa al-Adawiya Mosque, Cairo
- List of Sufis
