= Gumbazi Sayidon Mausoleum =

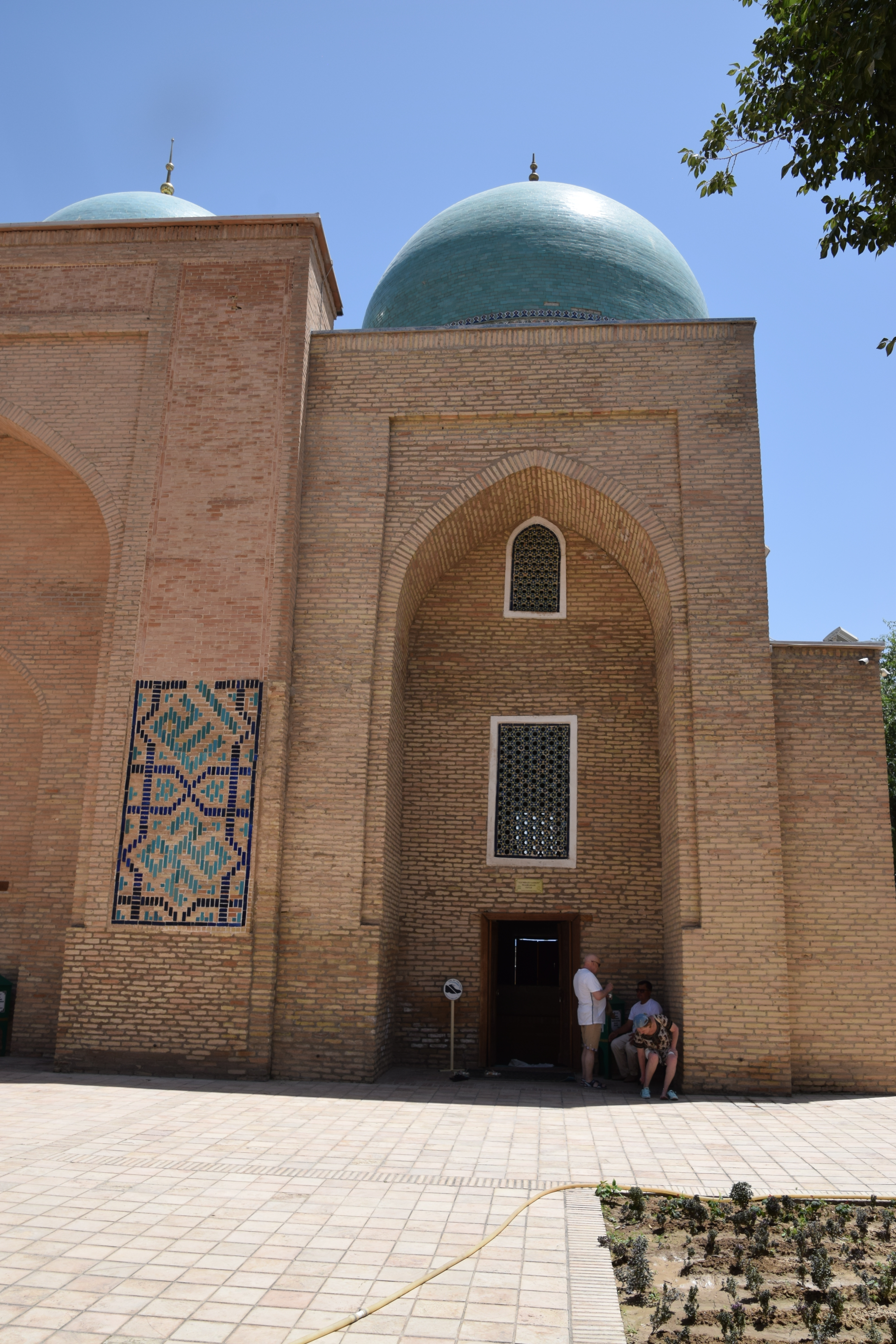
- Interactive map of the Gumbazi Sayidon Mausoleum area
- Alternative names: Sayidlar Gumbaz, Ulugbek's mausoleum, Gumbazi Seyidon

General information
- Status: under the protection of the state
- Type: Maausoleum
- Architectural style: Central Asian architecture
- Location: Qoʻshxovuz MFY, Shahrisabz, Uzbekistan
- Coordinates: 39.25930°N 66.493825°E
- Construction started: 1437
- Construction stopped: 1438

Gumbazi Sayidon (or "Sayidlar Gumbazi" mausoleum) is an architectural monument located in Shahrisabz. This mausoleum is also popularly known as Sayidlar Gumbaz, Ulugbek's mausoleum, Gumbazi Seyidon.

== Location ==
Gumbazi Sayidon mausoleum is part of the Dorut Tilavat complex located south of the central square of Shahrisabz city. It is located in the southern part of the complex, on the opposite side of the Kuk Gumbaz Mosque (Shahrisabz). Gumbazi Seyidon mausoleum is the smallest mausoleum in the Dorut Tilovat complex.

== Architecture ==
It was built between 1437 and 1438 by order of Mirzo Ulugbek.

According to some sources, the Gumbazi Sayidon mausoleum was built by Mirzo Ulugbek instead of the cemetery belonging to the Sayid dynasty and was intended only for the Timurids and their families.

On the graves of the Sayyids of Termez located in this mausoleum, saghanas were erected by local residents and visitors. Most of these tombs have disappeared to this day. But their photos have been preserved.

== Structure ==
The Gumbazi Sayyidan mausoleum is rectangular in shape, the outer size is 9 x 9 meters, and the inner side is 5.75 x 5.75 meters. The base is covered with an octagonal prismatic dome. The pediment and outer dome collapsed (today the dome has been restored). Kufic inscriptions are written between the girish and Islamic motifs on the base. The arches on the inner walls of the mausoleum are located in two rows, and holes and wide shelves are placed in the corners above them. Twelve and six-sided gyrikhs can be found inside the circular pillars on the wall.

The floor of the central hall in the Gumbazi Sayyidan mausoleum is equipped with blue hexagonal panels. The walls are decorated with elegant paintings in red and blue colors.

Beneath the brick wall on the western side of the mausoleum, there are vault-like tomb structures (saganas). Most of these legends have been destroyed.

The entrance to the mausoleum is decorated with exquisite carvings.

== Nomenclature ==
In the inscriptions inside the mausoleum (15th - 18th century), the names of the Sayyids of Termiz (Amir Abdul Muani, Muhammad Syed and Magrufjan Muani) from the descendants of Mirza Ulugbek are written. For this reason, the mausoleum was named "Sayidlar Dome".

In some sources, the mausoleum is also called the Ulugbek Mausoleum.

The mausoleum of Gumbazi Sayidan and Shamsuddin Kulol Mausoleum is a special "religious-ideological center" of Shahrisabz's huge shrine.

== See also ==
Dorut Tilavat
