= Shamsuddin Kulol Mausoleum =

Historic site in Qashqadaryo Region, Uzbekistan

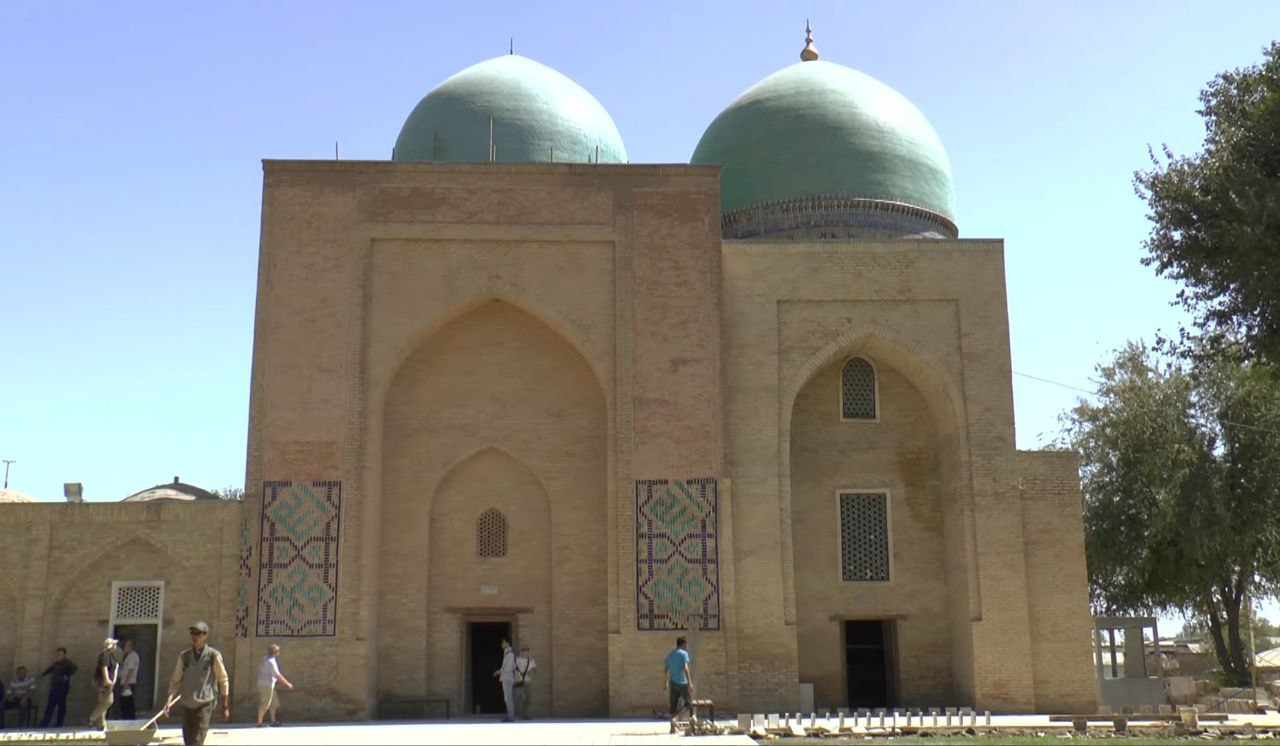
- Shamsuddin Kulol Mausoleum (left)
- Interactive map of the Shamsuddin Kulol Mausoleum area

General information
- Location: 89, Ipak yuli st., Koshhovuz neighborhood, Shahrisabz, Qashqadaryo Region, Uzbekistan
- Coordinates: 39°02′59″N 66°49′40″E
- Construction started: 1373
- Construction stopped: 1374
- Demolished: 20th century

Technical details
- Floor area: 12.1x10.6 m

Shamsuddin Kulol Mausoleum is a 15th-century architectural monument in the city of Shahrisabz, Qashqadaryo Region, Uzbekistan. It was built on the grave of Amir Temur's father Amir Taragoi and Shamsuddin Kulol, Temur's teacher. The Shamsuddin Kulol Mausoleum is the first example of a new architectural style formed during the period of Amir Temur, especially the structure under the dome inside the building – intersecting arches and shield-like decorations between them had an important influence on the architectural style. Shamsuddin Kulol mausoleum is located in the "Dorut Tilavat" complex.

== Architecture ==
The mausoleum was built in a rectangular shape, the total area is 12.1 × 10.6 meters. The building is completely built of brick. The entrance door is carved with flower-like patterns. It contains Islamic motifs and Kufic inscriptions. The wooden gate was made by craftsmen from Bukhara.

The dome of the mausoleum was demolished at the beginning of the 20th century, and replaced by a single-columned flat roof.

The burial chamber of Shamsiddin Kulol was also decorated with Arabic inscriptions and is considered the main building of Dorut Tilavat complex. The second building was made of shaped bricks. In the past, the gates of the mosque, special places for prayers, an octagonal pool for ablution, and a minaret with a height of 10.5 meters were built in the mausoleum. There was also a small garden with marble steps and brick paths around the mausoleum.

== History ==
The construction of this mausoleum began in 1373 by the decree of Amir Temur. Construction work was completed in 1374. The mausoleum and mausoleum of Gumbazi Sayidon, built by Mirzo Ulug Beg, which is part of the complex, also consists of several rooms. Here are the graves of Amir Temur's father Muhammed Taragai and Amir Temur's teacher Sheikh Shamsiddin Kulal.

In the early years of independence of Uzbekistan, a simple mausoleum was built in the area near the burial place of Shamsiddin Kulol by religious leaders of Kagan and Naqshbandi sect. However, the exact burial place of the sheikh had not been determined. In 2008, the certain area was identified and current two-story mausoleum was built on the 6-hectare area.

== Gallery ==
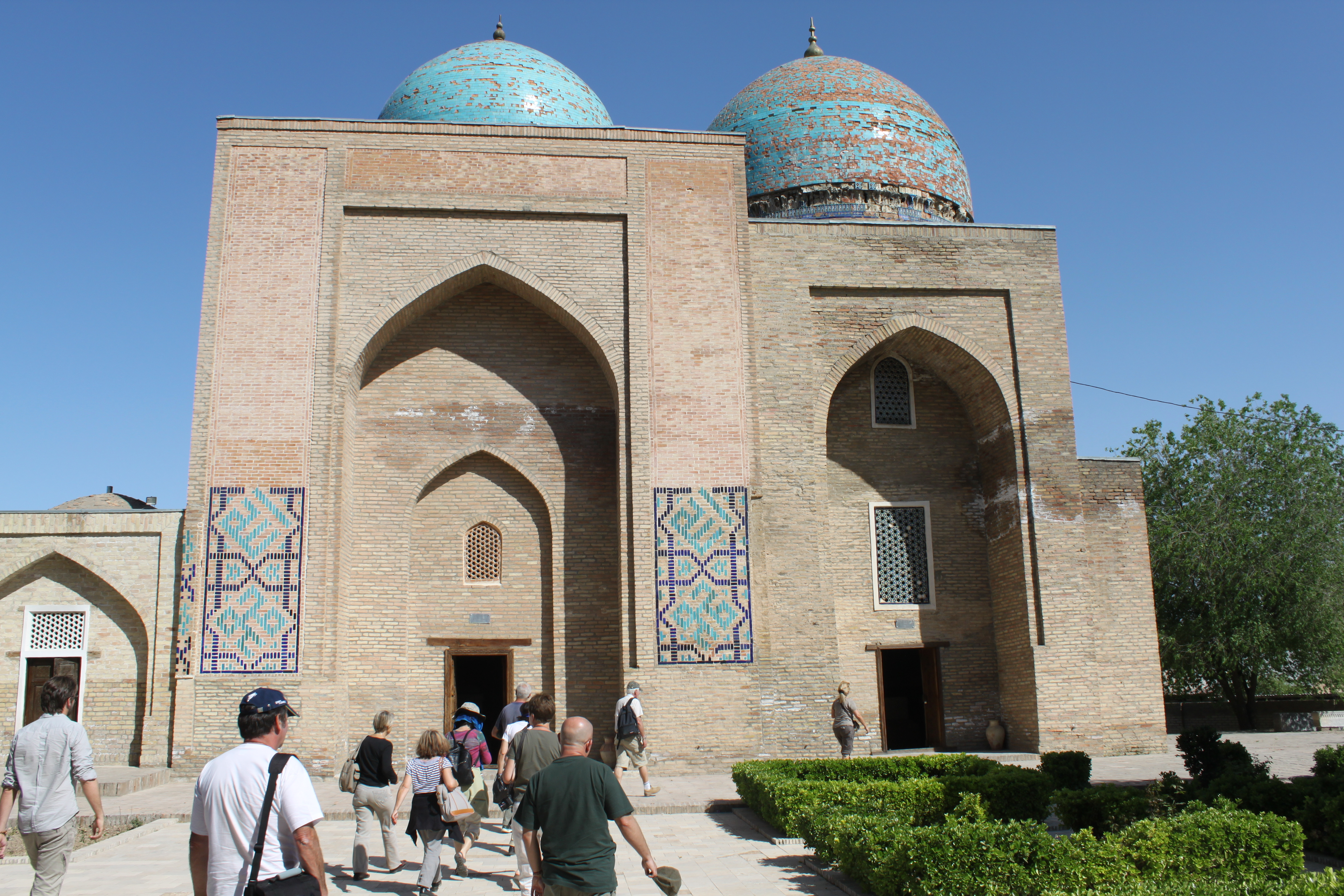
External view of Shamsuddin Kulol Mausoleum (left)

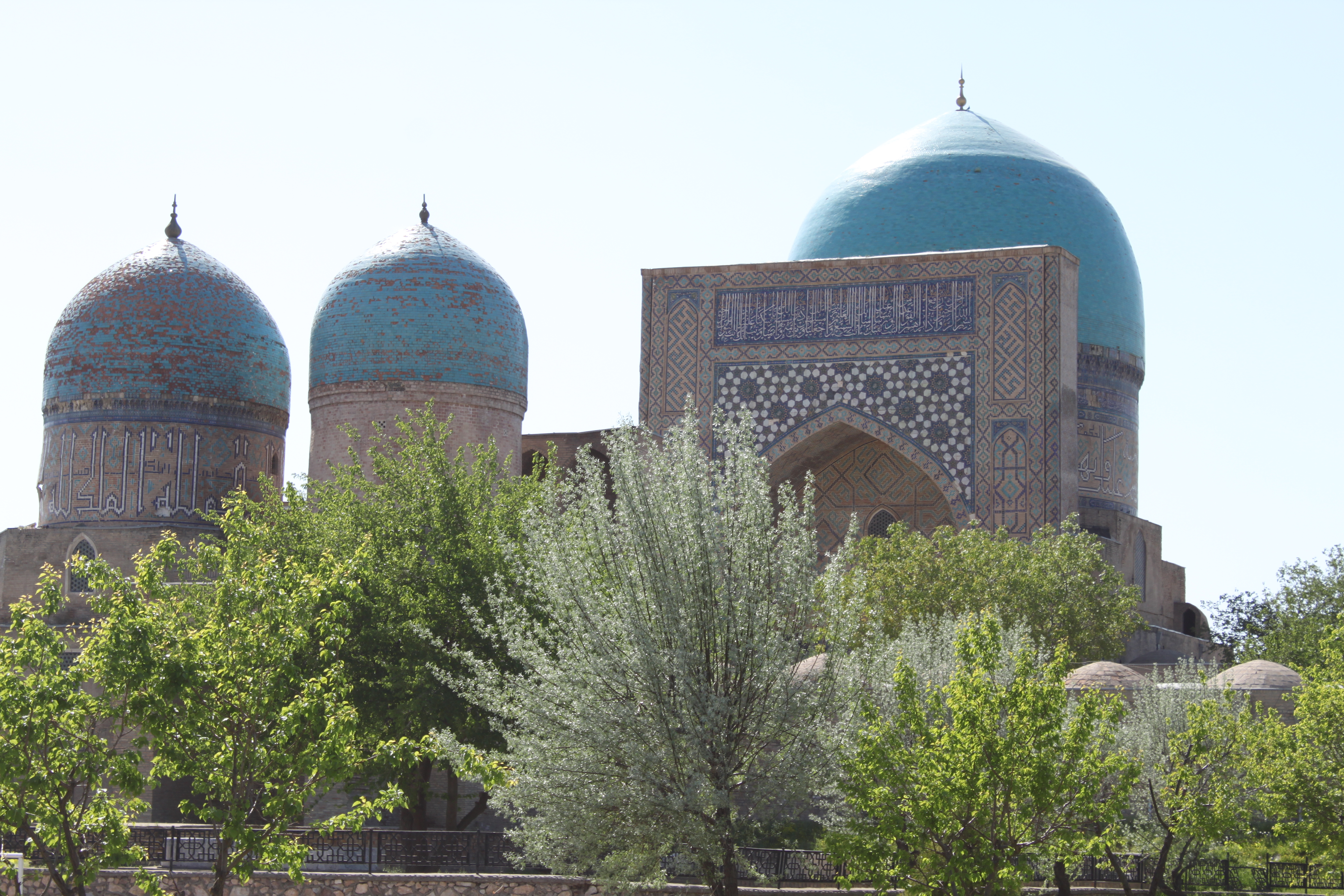
Dorut Tilavat Complex

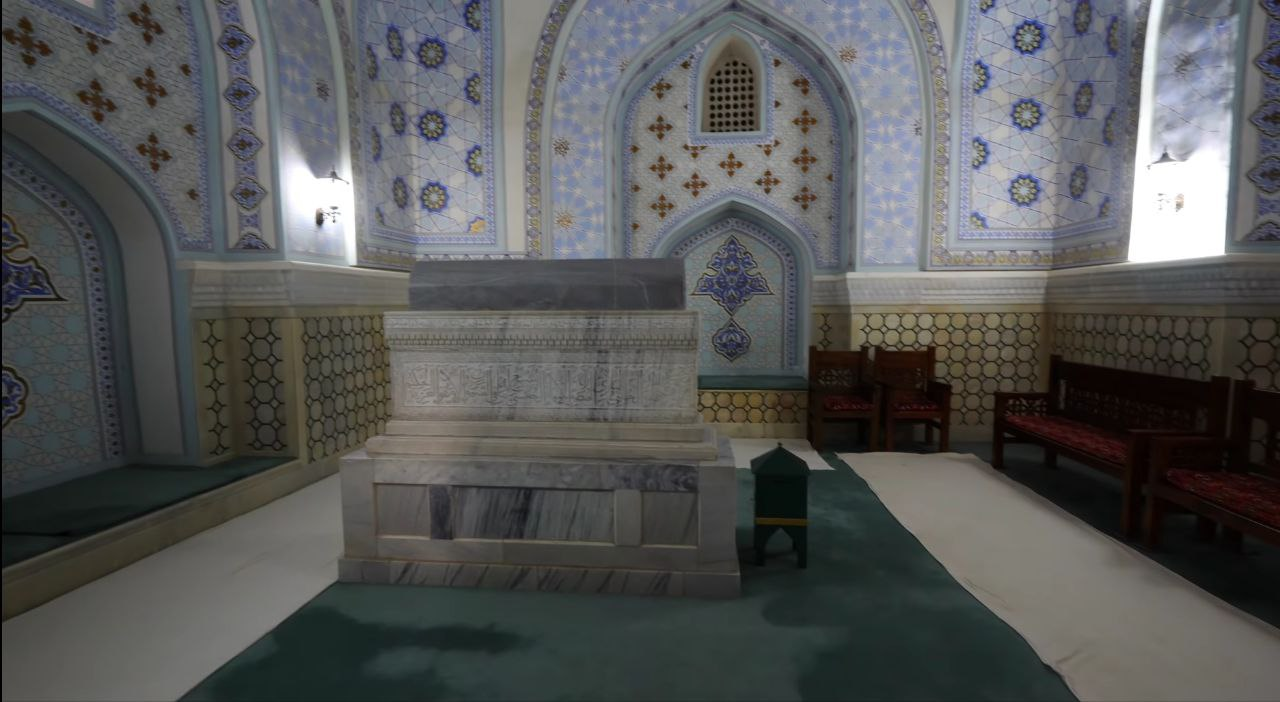
Tomb of Shamsuddin Kulol

== See also ==
- Gumbazi Sayidon Mausoleum
- Kuk Gumbaz Mosque (Shahrisabz)
- Dorut Tilavat
