= Kuk Gumbaz Mosque (Shahrisabz) =

Mosque in Shahrisabz, Qashqadaryo, Uzbekistan

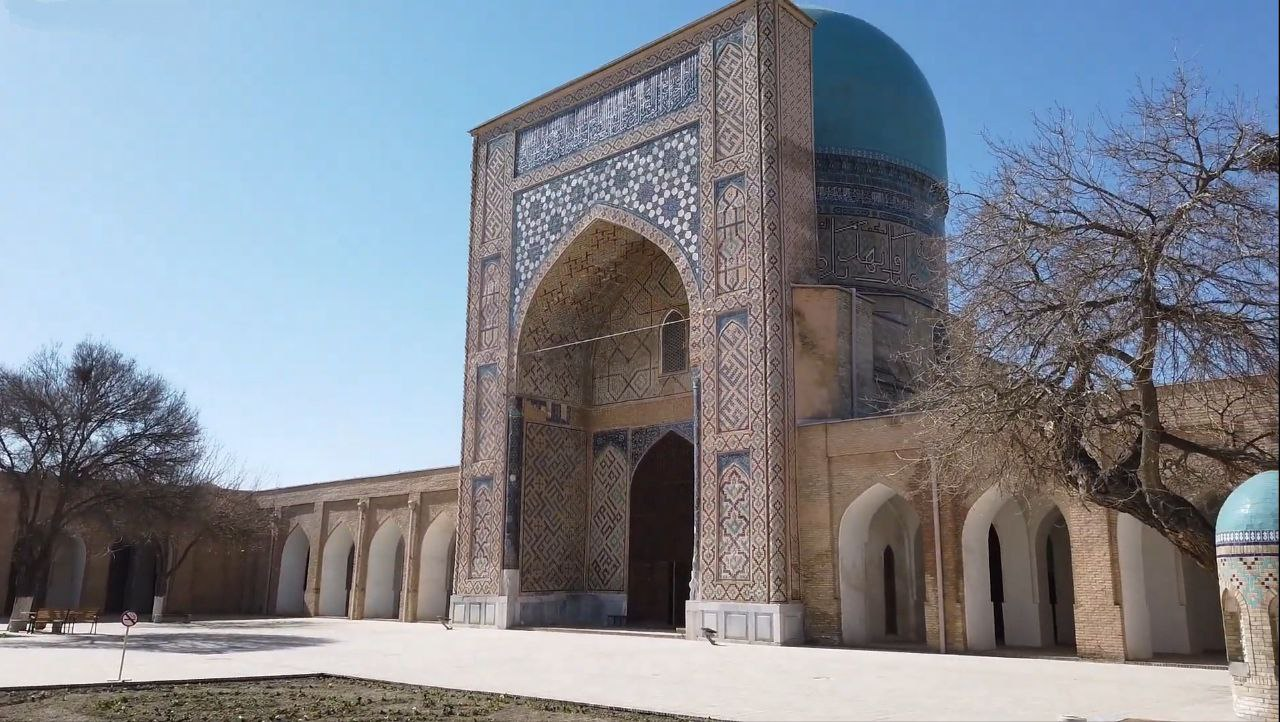
- Interactive map of the Kuk Gumbaz Mosque area

General information
- Location: Koshhovuz neighborhood, Shahrisabz, Qashqadaryo Region, Uzbekistan
- Coordinates: 39°02′59″N 66°49′38″E
- Construction started: 1434
- Construction stopped: 1435

Technical details
- Floor area: 12.60 × 12.61 m

Kuk Gumbaz Mosque is an architectural monument located in Shahrisabz, Qashqadaryo Region, Uzbekistan. The mosque was built between 1434 and 1435 by Ulug Beg Mirzo for his father Shah Rukh Mirzo. Historical inscriptions with the names of the Timurids and the time of construction have been preserved in the porch of the mosque.

== Location ==
Kuk Gumbaz Mosque is the main mosque in the ensemble of Dorut Tilavat (located in the south of Shahrisabz, near the "Chorsu" shopping complex). It was built on the opposite side of Gumbazi Sayidon Mausoleum and Shamsuddin Kulol Mausoleum.

This mosque is the main monument of the Dorut Tilavat complex.

== Etymology ==
Mosque has a large dome covered with blue tiles which inspired the mosque's name.

== Architecture ==
The structure of the Kuk Gumbaz Mosque is square and the total area is 12.50 x 12.61 meters. The mosque was covered with a dome of blue tiles. The four sides of the building are equipped with deep tunnels.

The columns on the right and left sides of the facade of the mosque and the bulakhona were damaged. The building is entered from the east through a porch (10 meters wide). A lot of geometric decorations were used on the pediment. The tiles are single-layered on the facade and interior of the building. Arabic script is decorated with traditional patterns of various types. Floral ceramics were used on the columns and arches. The total area of the mosque's interior is 12.7 x 12.7 meters, and its outer dome is decorated with blue, blue and white decorations. Quranic verses were written between them. The 8 small arches in the inner part of the hall are interconnected with rhombic shield-shaped arches and supported by sixteen arches. There are 4 spiral staircases built in the corners of the brick wall. The side walls of the porch were accessed through a wide archway. All of them are now closed.

=== Inscriptions on the dome ===
The dome of the mosque is lined with mosaic brick tiles with inscriptions written in the Kufic script. In the middle of the border, verses 1–3 of Surah "Fath" of the Holy Qur'an were written in large white letters on a yellow background. Under the dome of the mosque, the text of the Holy Qur'an "Sura Juma" was written in small letters on a blue background. This part was later repaired.

=== Inscriptions on the facade ===
There are inscriptions written in the Kufic Bannai script on the pediments, where the sentence "Allah is great" was repeatedly written. At the same time, verses 127–128 of the Qur'anic Surah Al-Baqarah are written in suls script on a blue background. These inscriptions were restored during the renovation in 1995.

== Renovation ==
Kuk Gumbaz Mosque has been renovated several times. In particular, it was renovated in the 1970s and in 1995–1996 in connection with the 660th anniversary of Amir Temur [4]. Some inscriptions were damaged as a result of poor quality repairs carried out in 1975 and in 1992–1999. As a result, the original appearance of the mosque was lost.

== Gallery ==
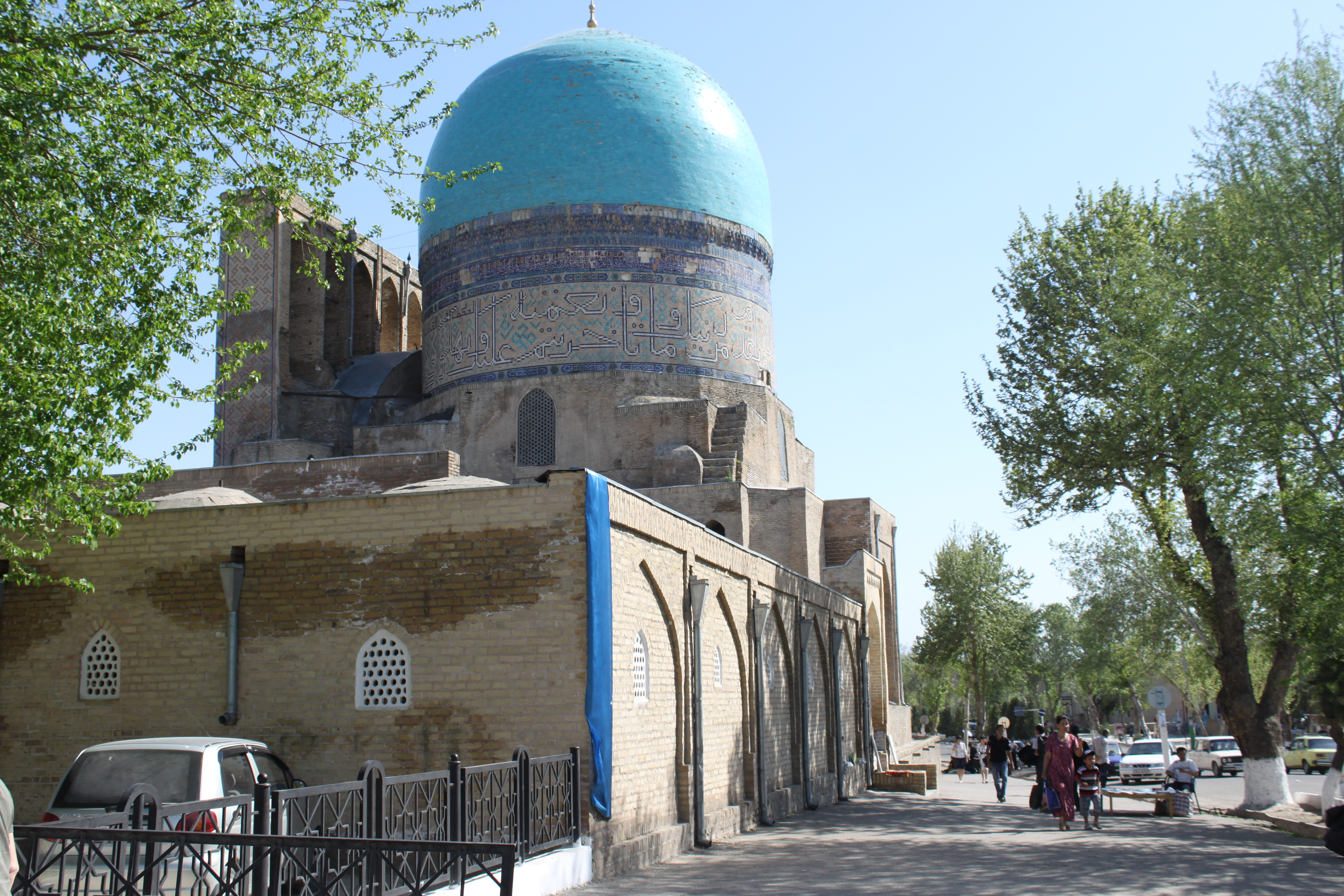
Outside view of the mosque

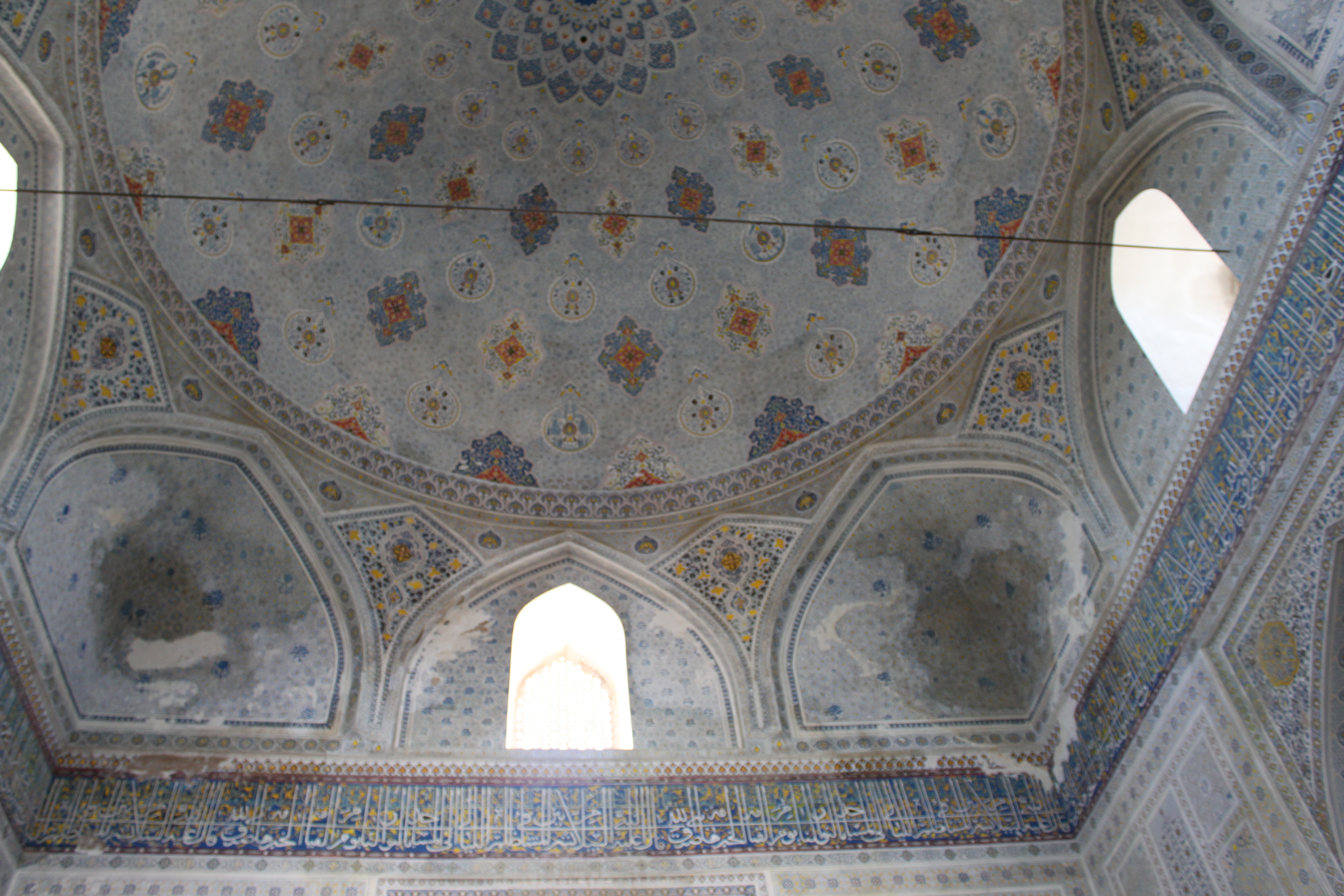
Pediment of the Mosque

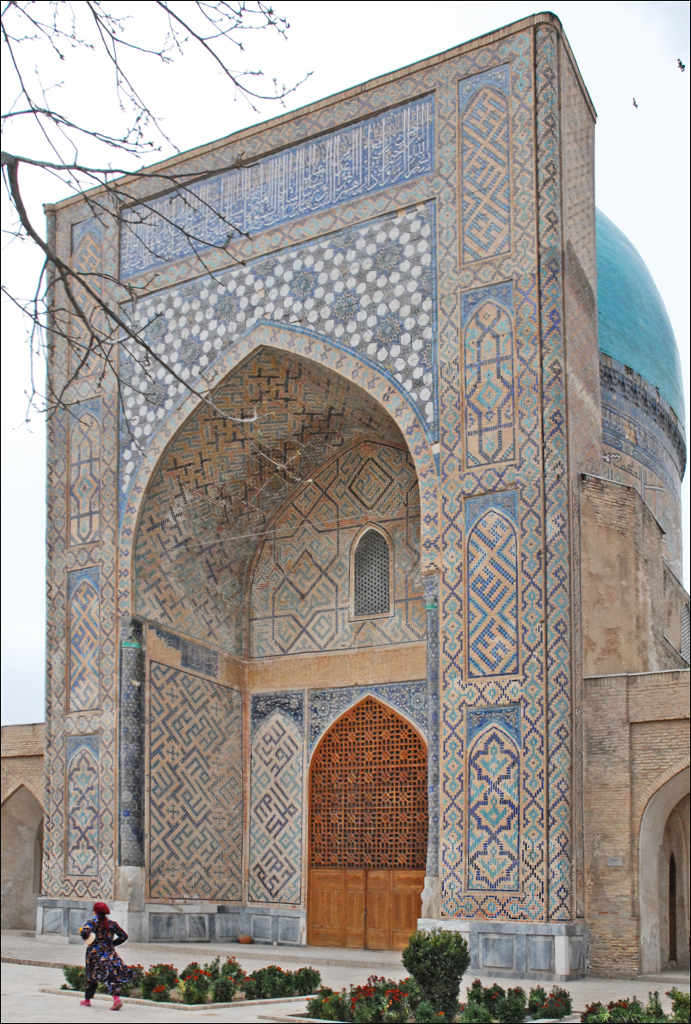
Main facade

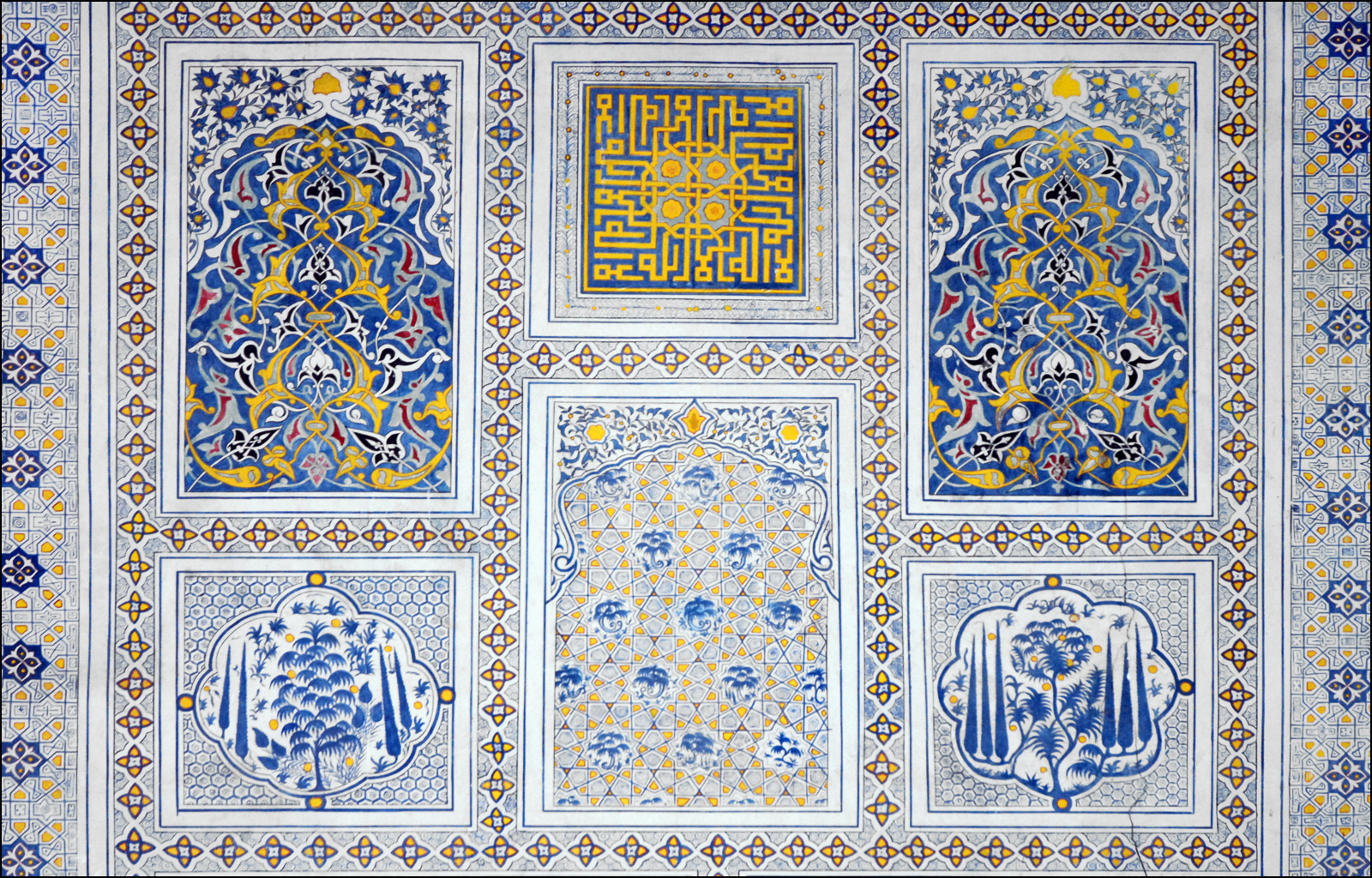
Decorations of the Mosque

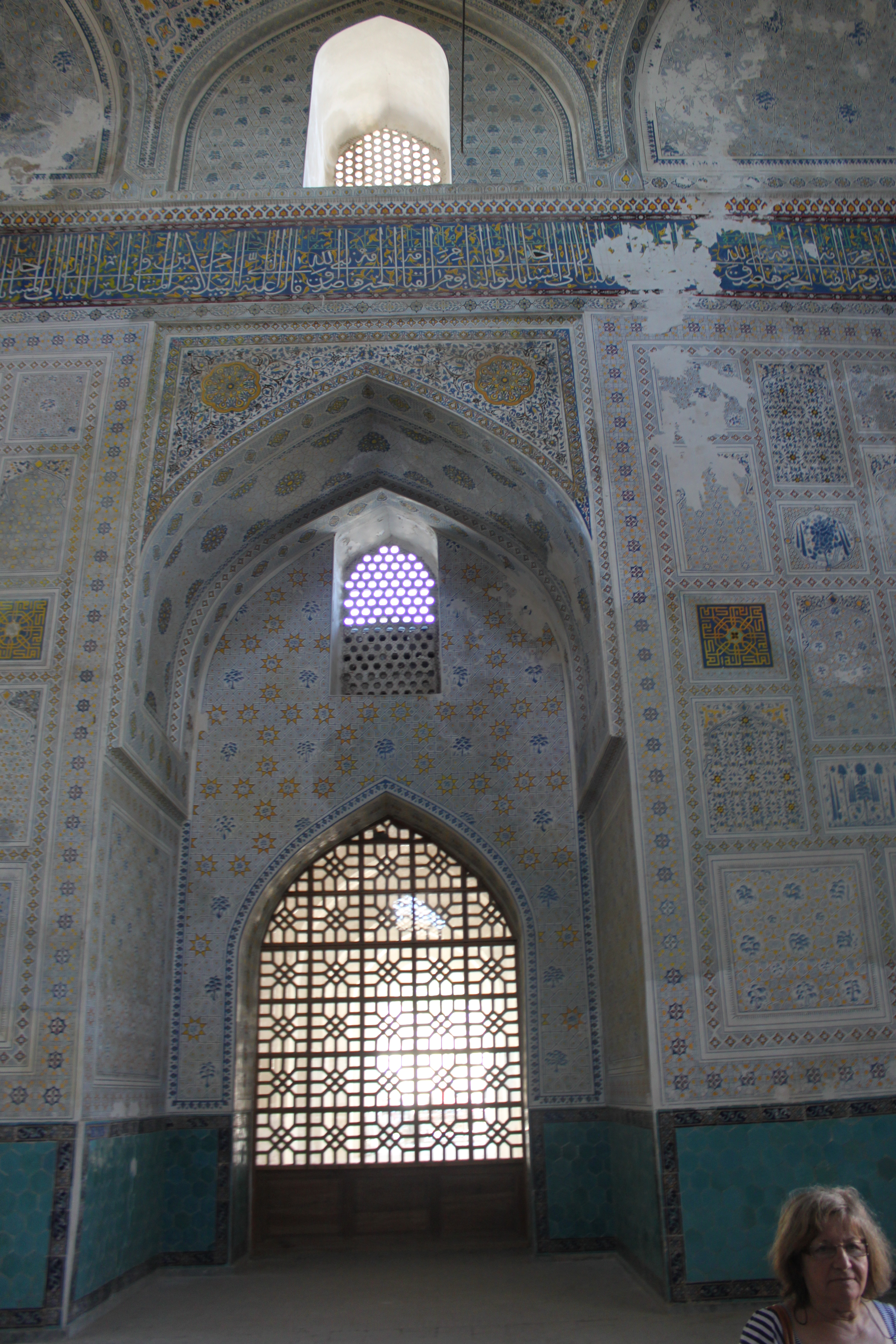
Interior of the Mosque

== See also ==
- Gumbazi Sayidon Mausoleum
- Shamsuddin Kulol Mausoleum
- Kuk Gumbaz Mosque (Qarshi)
