= Amir Kulal =

Persian Sufi Islamic scholar (1278–1370)

Amir Kulāl
- امیر کلال
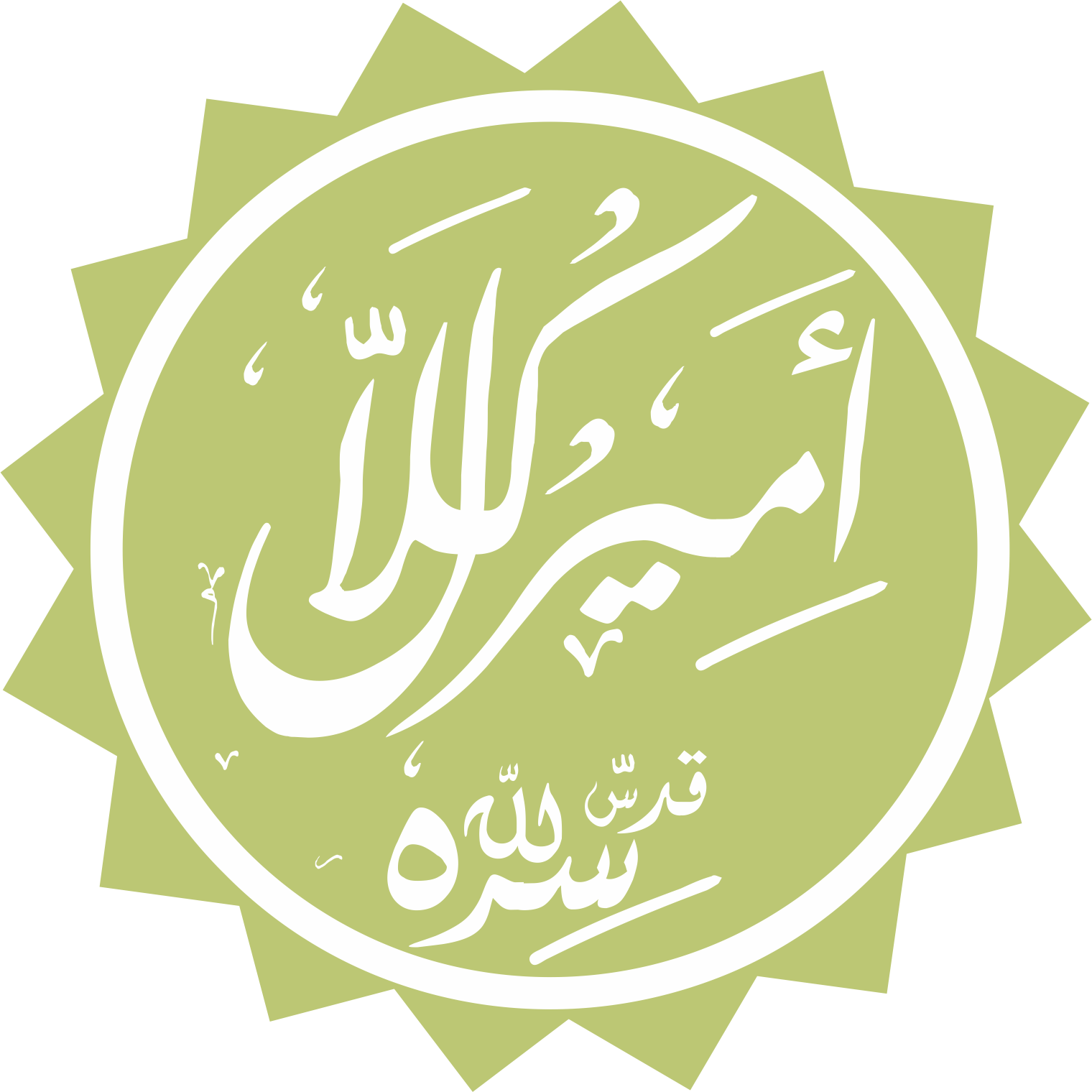
- Born: Shams ud-Dīn; 1278; Bukhara, Chagatai Khanate
- Died: 1370 (aged 91–92); Sokhar, present-day Uzbekistan

Amir Kulāl (1278–1370), Persian: امیر کلال, Arabic: امیر کلال, birth name Shams ud-Dīn (Persian: شمس الدین, Arabic: شمس الدین), was a Persian Sufi Islamic scholar, widely considered to be one of the most influential in history. He was a member of the mystical Khajagan order. His father was the Sufi scholar Saif ud-Dīn Hamza (سیف الدین حمزہ), a sayyid descendant of Muhammad. Saif ud-Dīn Hamza was amir (chieftain) of the Persian Kulal-Tribe, his full title being Amir-i-Kulal. After his father's death, Shams ud-Dīn became the amir and head of the tribe. By this time his reputation as a scholar and religious figure had spread through Chagatai Khanate and the title Amir-i-Kulal, had become his common name. Because he made earthenware, he was popularly referred to as “Kulāl”, which means "potter" in Persian.

Kulal had a number of students who later became prominent figures in history, including Baha-ud-Dīn Naqshband. After the rise of the Timurid dynasty, a close relationship began between the houses of Amir Timur and Amir Kulal and continued through the Mughal line in India. Kulal is buried at Sokhar, near Bukhara, Uzbekistan.

== Family lineage and Kulal tribe ==
The Kulal tribe settled in the area of modern-day Vabkent near the end of the twelfth century. Around 1340, the city was visited by Ibn Battuta who spent a night there as a guest. Battuta described it as beautiful, saying that it had "... many gardens and rivers". The tribe's date of settlement can be approximated with the remains of the madrasa (a form of Mosque) which was constructed at Vabkent in 1198 under the patronage of Burhan ud-Din Abdul Aziz II (whose name adorns the Madrasa's minaret, the only surviving segment of the building). The builders of the madrasa were members of the Kulal tribe and copied the Kalyan mosque (Po-i-Kalyan) style, making upgrades in the design and technology. This made the Vabkent madrasa a more refined form of Kalyan mosque.

The tribe quickly established a small industrial base at the central market of Vabkent and built mills in the surrounding areas, which continued to operate well into the sixteenth century. The city's main industries were coin minting; alloying of steel; creating pottery; and milling. Their highly glazed pottery and tiles, unmatched in quality and quantity, were their main export. This earned the tribe the title of Kulal (potter) and gave them their name. Their kiln designs were highly efficient and were able to produce up to 1500 pots in each batch. Utilizing wind and water resources for milling and industrial processes coupled with efficient kiln designs resulted in considerably higher earnings per capita, leading to a healthy lifestyle for the entire tribe.

Despite a history of wars and conflict in the area, the Kulal tribe was not once attacked. There are three main reasons for this:

- The tribe was famous as being entirely composed of descendants of Muhammad, gaining them considerable respect from the neighboring tribes; this was a considerable advantage in a Muslim dominated country.
- The city was surrounded by a terrain of gardens and greenery criss-crossed by numerous rivers and streams at one side and an endless desert at the other, which was barren and uninhabited. This, coupled with the lack of substantial material value in the small city, was a big enough deterrent for any invading army which would have to travel at least one day to reach the city which lied at the boundary of the Kyzyl Kum desert.
- The social system was devised into three sections—the political system, monetary system, and publicity system. Their political system was simple. The most learned of the tribe was chosen as the head. The goal of the head, other than being the qazi and administrator was to represent the tribe and politically maneuver through times of war. Also, the post was not hereditary. No hereditary claim to the "throne" meant there wasn't one family in the tribe which would grow up to have amassed huge portions of tribe wealth in a couple of generations, in case the head turned out to be corrupt. Also, this avoided any mutual tussles between heirs of any deceased chieftain, as there was nothing to fight for. Their monetary system was even more advanced (for their time) than the political system. All of the mills and manufacturing plants were owned in essence by the community. Anyone willing and skilled was allowed to operate and earn a living as long as he kept the structure maintained and donated for construction of newer structures. The system worked superbly well and at least at a smaller scale of a couple of thousand individuals proved could be sustained for a number of centuries. Strict codes of intermarriages within the tribe, relatively small birthrates (compared to the one prevalent at the times), single marriages and continuous outward migration meant the population stayed nearly constant throughout the time period.

By the time of Amir Kulal wrestling had become a Kulal trademark sport. The tribe held regular contests both at Vabkent and Bukhara in which outsiders also competed. The Kulal youth were almost always successful, instilling the idea of the Kulal tribe as superior and fierce warriors.

== Early life ==
Shams ud-Dīn Amir Kulal was born at Bukhara. His father Saif ud-Dīn Hamza was head of the Kulal tribe and a renowned scholar. As head of the tribe, Saif ud-Dīn Hamza was titled Amir-i-Kulal (Leader of Kulal tribe). Shams ud-Dīn was educated in his childhood and early in his life took the position of head of the madrasa at Vabkent. He was also known as a great wrestler. By the time he became the head of Kulal tribe his fame as a scholar and religious figure had spread through the surrounding region with many noble and powerful families sending their children to study under him, most notably from the Barlas Tribe.

== Amir-i-Kulal ==
Shams ud-Dīn Kulal was elected as tribe's head after his father's death. Although all the heads of Kulal were titled Amir-i-Kulal, it was Shams ud-Dīn whose name has become synonymous with the title-name. Today, he is mostly remembered as Amir Kulal, rather than his birth name.

Kulal continued to teach at the madrasa, even when he was head of the tribe. One of his most famous disciples was Baha-ud-Din Naqshband Bukhari, who used to work as an executioner in Bukhara under the rule of Qazan Khan ibn Yasaur. Legend says that Baha ud-Dīn was ordered to execute a man who had angered the king, but right before his execution the accused called upon Amir Kulal, identifying him as his teacher. Amir Kulal intervened and the accused was set free on his intercession. This was Baha ud-Dīn's first encounter with Amir Kulal. Impressed by him, Baha ud-Dīn became his student.

Amir Kulal also had a sizable following of spiritual protégés. Of these the most prominent was Turghai who had previously been influenced by Amir Kulal's grandfather. After Turghai's death his son Timur held Amir Kulal in the same esteem, holding him as his spiritual guide.

Around the year 1340, Ibn Battuta made a day stop at Vabkent who later described the city as beautiful with many rivers and gardens. He was Amir's guest at the city and was guided towards Bukhara, then at a day's travel from Vabkent.

In the year 1357, Timur approached Amir Kulal for his advice on strategic maneuvers for attacking Uzbeks. It was under his advice that Timur changed his attack plan.

Amir Kulal died in 770/1370 and was buried in Sukhar (Sokhar) near Bukhara. Sometimes Amir Kulal's tomb is confused with the tomb of his grandfather (also Shams ud-Dīn Kulal). It is Shams ud-Dīn Kulal (Amir Kulal's grandfather) who is buried at Shahrisabz(Kesh); the Green City. Amir Kulal's grandfather had constructed the madrasa Dor-i-Tilavat/Dorut Tilavat (House of Mediation) and was buried here after his death. Later, Timur transferred the body of his father Turghai, to be near the grave of Shams ud-Dīn (Amir Kulal's grandfather). Amir Kulal's grandfather was Turghai and Barlas Tribe's spiritual mentor. Majority of Timur's family is also buried at the same place. Recently, his tomb had been renovated under the orders of Uzbekistan's president.

None of the books written by Amir Kulal still exist, although some excerpts and essays have survived in the family library. Three copies of a biography of Amir Kulal "Maqamat-i-Amir Kulal" written by his great-grandson Shihab ul-Dīn have survived.

== Descendants ==
After Amir Kulal's death his descendants, propagated from his four sons (Burhanudeen, Shah, Hamzah, and Omar), continued to associate with the Timurid and then Mughal dynasty kings and princes as their friends and teachers. Amir Kulal's grandson Amir Kalan (Muhammad ibn Shah ibn Amir Kulal) was entrusted with the education of young Ulugh Beg. Although Amir Kalan is renowned for his religious scholarship he was also well versed in mathematics and astronomy, and introduced these sciences to the young prince. At Ulugh Beg's madrasa Amir Kalan was considered one of the top ten teachers with unparalleled proficiency in ulum-i-yaainia, dinia and ulum-i-shariat. Amir Sultan (Muhammad Shmsudeen ibn Ali ibn Burhanudeen ibn Amir Kulal), another grandson of Amir Kulal married Ottoman Sultan, Bayezid I's daughter. After Babur established the Mughal Empire in India many of Amir Kulal's descendants moved there and continued to enjoy an influence in the Mughal dynasty. They remained as teachers and mentors of Mughal princes and kings or their close friends. Last of these was Shah Abbas, tutor of Mughal King Farrukhsiyar. By the time Farrukhsiyar was enthroned, the family had parted ways from the Mughals. After about one hundred years the family comes to prominence with Sheikh Samad Ali, one of the prominent students of Shah Abdul Aziz. Although his exploits as an engineering entrepreneur overshadows his scholarly work, his son Hakim Qadir Ali earned fame both as a scholar and doctor. His great-grandson Shah Altaf was renowned as a scholar and scientist in the area around Delhi, and his school attracted many students from this area. After its founding, the majority of Amir Kulal's descendants emigrated to Pakistan.

=== Shaykhan family ===
The Shaykhan family claims ancestry from the Naqshbandi Sufi saint of Bukhara Shaykh Shams ud-Dīn Muhammad Amir Kulal. During the early period of Islamic history the ancestors of Amir Kulal migrated from Al Madinah and settled in Shaykhan Ninawa, Iraq where successive generations lived for over five centuries. The entire family later emigrated to Janah, Iran and thereafter to Bukhara in modern Uzbekistan.

The generations following Amir Kulal lived in Bukhara for more than a century. Some notable descendants included: Amir Hamzah Ibn Amir Kulal (d800H), known as Baba Mir, a leading Naqshbandi Sufi saint with large following of spiritual protégés; Amir Hasan Zaman Ibn Amir Hamzah (d 825H), buried in Sokhar near Bukhara. Amir Masud Zaman Ibn Amir Hasan Zaman (d 875H), buried in Samarkand; and Amir Muhammad Arifullah Ibn Amir Masud Zaman (847-909H), fourth in descent from Amir Kulal, a prominent Naqshbandi Sufi saint and a spiritual mentor of Umar Shaykh Mirza (1456-1494AD), ruler of the province of Fergana and father of Zahir ud-Dīn Muhammad Babur (1483-1530AD), founder of the Mughal empire in India.

Emperor Babur, fifth in descent from Amir Timur and founder of the Timurid dynasty which ruled northern India for nearly four centuries, was mindful of his Central Asian origin and, following in the steps of Timur, gave extensive patronage to descendants of Amir Kulal.

Shaykh Sayyid Zain ud-Dīn Ibn Amir Muhammad Arifullah (d.940H/1533AD) was a writer, a poet and belonged to Naqshbandi Sufi Order. Translated memoirs of Mughal Emperor Babur into Persian and was author of the book Tabaqat-e-Baburi. Shaykh Zain ud-Dīn was part of Babur's entourage when he occupied Kabul in 910H/1504AD and later in 932H/1525AD in his fifth expedition to Hindustan accompanied him to India. In his memoirs Babur writes that on entering Delhi after the victorious battle of Panipat in 932H/1526AD against Sultan Ibrahim Lodi he asked Shaykh Zain ud-Dīn to lead the Friday prayers and recite the Khutba (proclamation) in his name. Decrees of the Emperor announcing victories at the battle of Panipat and against Rana Sanga and the Rajput coalition at the battle of Khanua 933H/March 17, 1527AD were composed by Shaykh Zain ud-Dīn which were copied and dispatched to the entire realm.

Shaykh Zain ud-Dīn was "Sadr-us-sudur" responsible for the judicial administration and religious affairs of the Mughal Empire and also for drafting and issuing emperors decrees in accordance with the Quran and Sunnah. He died in Agra, India and was buried in the courtyard of a Madrasa built by him. Khwaja Sultan Ali Ibn Shaykh Zain ud-Dīn (d. 970H) was a minister with second Mughal emperor Humayun (1508-1556AD) and later ambassador to Iran during the reign of emperor Akbar (1556-1605AD). Amir Mansoor Khan Ibn Khawaja Sultan Ali (d. 982H) was a senior general in the Mughal army. He died while hunting near Hyderabad Deccan. Shaykh Sayyid Muhammad Adil Khan Ibn Amir Mansoor Khan (d. 1019H) served as a Mughal high-ranking military official in the provinces of Lahore, Multan, Kashmir and Kabul. Shaykh Sayyid Abu Saeed Ibn Shaykh Sayyid Mohammad Adil Khan (d.1043H) was a general in emperor Jahangir's (1569-1627AD) army and later performed important ministerial duties at Jehangir's court. Amir Shaykh Farrukh Zaman Khan Ibn Shaykh Sayyid Abu Saeed (d. 1089H) rose to the illustrious position of the Captain of the Mughal Red Fort at Shahjahanabad in emperor Shah jahan's reign (1627-1659AD) Amir Shah Sajawal Ibn Amir Shaykh Farrukh Zaman Khan (d. 1120H) eleventh in direct descent from Amir Kulal was a Naqshbandi Sufi saint and a tutor to Mughal princes during the reign of emperor Awrangzeb (1659-1707AD) apart from being officer in charge of administration of Mughal court.

Amir Shaykh Muhammad Zaman Sikandrabadi Ibn Amir Shah Sajawal was a leading noble of Sikandrabad (Bulandshahr / India). He lived in the reign of emperor Muhammad Shah (1719-1748AD) and was awarded with an estate at Akbarpur, Salarpur near Delhi. This was a time when the Mughal empire was under severe decline. Nadir Shah and Ahmed Shah Abdali had sacked Delhi and many noble Muslim families were facing severe economic decline and disorder. However, Amir Shaykh Muhammad Zaman Sikandrabadi's descendants preserved the family traditions of Sufism and were notable sadaats (descendants of Muhammad) of Chehel Amiran (later Koocha Chelan) in Delhi.

During the later Mughal period, the family continued to produce eminent men of learning who distinguished themselves in various walks of life. Shaykh Samad Ali ibn Amir Shaykh Mohammad Zaman an accomplished religious scholar and graduate of Rahimiya college (Delhi), a centre of Islamic Renaissance in the subcontinent under Shah Abdul Aziz Ibn Shah Waliullah (1746-1828 AD). Shaykh Mohammad Ali Ibn Shaykh Samad Ali a prominent Naqshbandi Sufi saint of Sikandarabad (Bulandshahr) India. Shaykh Karamat Hussain Ibn Shaykh Mohammad Ali (d. 1898AD) was Kotwal (Chief of Police) in Gwalior the capital of Gwalior State. Another elder of the family Shaykh Nabi Buksh a tutor to Mughal princes was awarded an estate near Delhi in the reign of last Mughal emperor Bahadur Shah (1837-1857).

During the traumatic year of 1857 AD when the War of Independence started, the family played a significant role against the British. Many died, others fled Delhi and took refuge in small towns / villages namely lncholi, Hapur, Danpur, Aounla, Sambhal, Amroha, Badarpur, Malyana and Jalali. Shaykh Karamat Hussain along with his entire family including his eldest son Shaykh Altaf Hussain (d. 1956AD) and buried in grave yard Bibi Pak Daman, Lahore, Pakistan who was barely seven years old proceeded to Sikandarabad but feeling unsafe due to close proximity of Bulandshahr settled in his ancestor's maternal town Dibai. Shaykh Karamat Hussain died in 1898 and was buried in family graveyard Gulabi Bagh (Dibai). The family lived in Mohalla Shaykhan (Dibai) and later also in Sikandarabad till 1947 AD when on founding of Pakistan migrated to Karachi.

In memory of their ancestor Amir Kulal, the family's farm located near the village Sarhali Kalan, 37 kilometers south of Lahore, Pakistan, is named Kulal Bagh.

=== Gallery ===
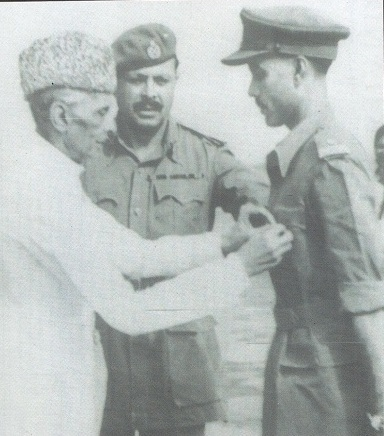
Major Mohammad Ahmed, grandson of Shaykh Altaf Hussain 18th in direct descent from Amir Kulal being awarded Military Cross by Quaid-e-Azam at DACCA (Former East Pakistan) 1948

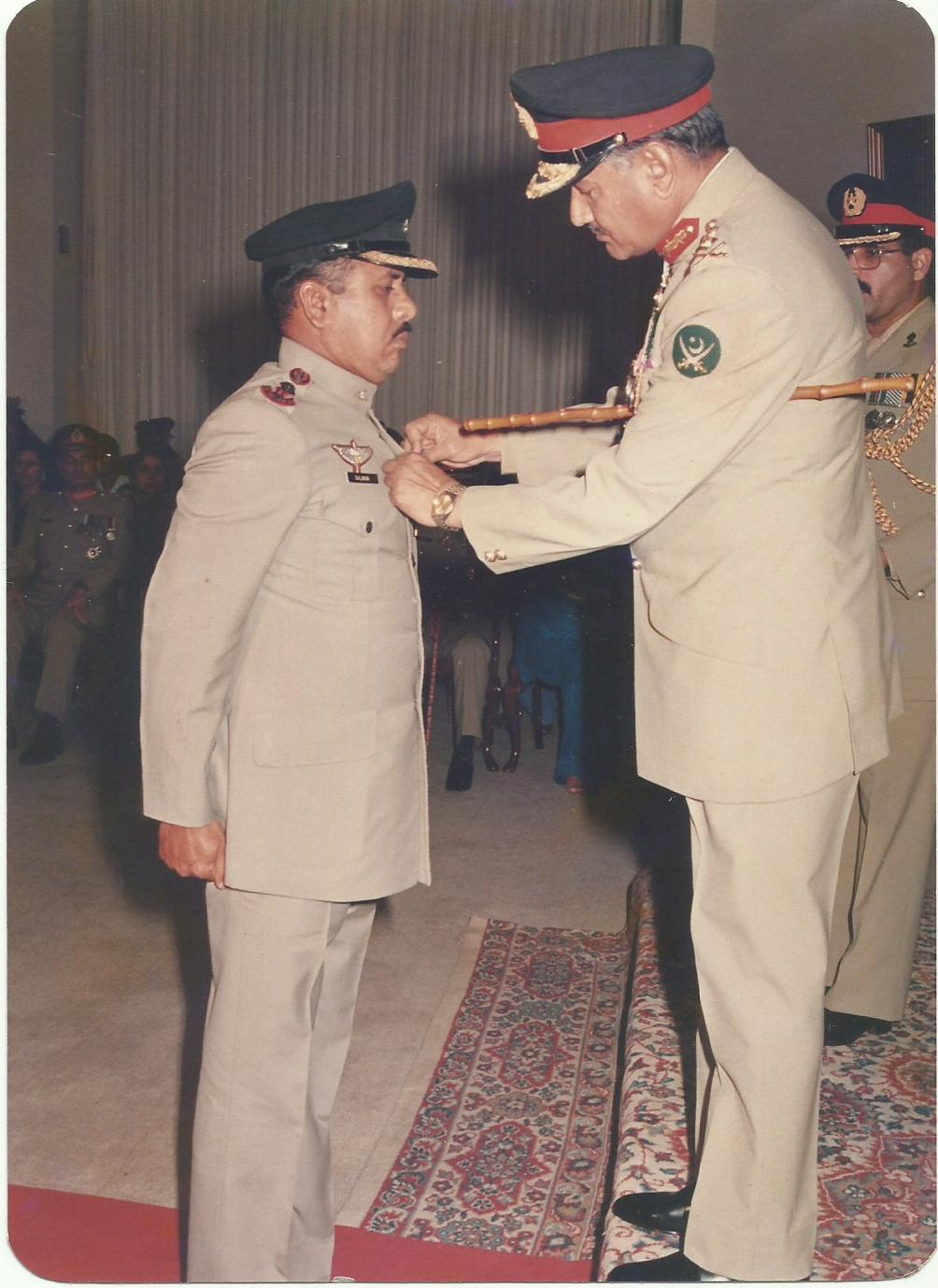
Colonel Salman Ahmed, great-grandson of Shaykh Altaf Hussain 19th in direct descent from Amir Kulal being awarded Sitara-e-Basalat by the Vice Chief of Army Staff at Rawalpindi, 1985

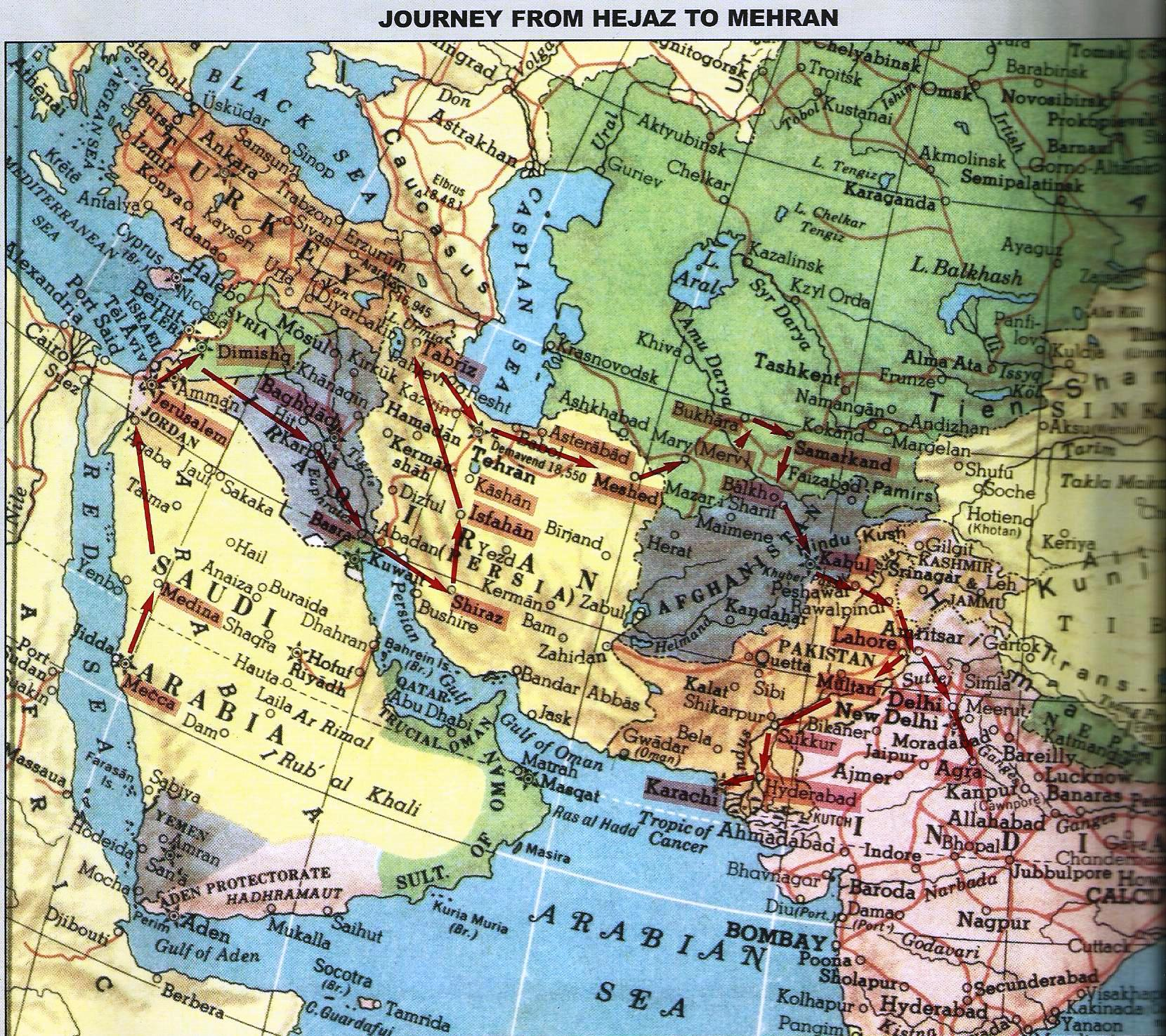
Journey of Shaykhan Family from Hejaz to Mehran

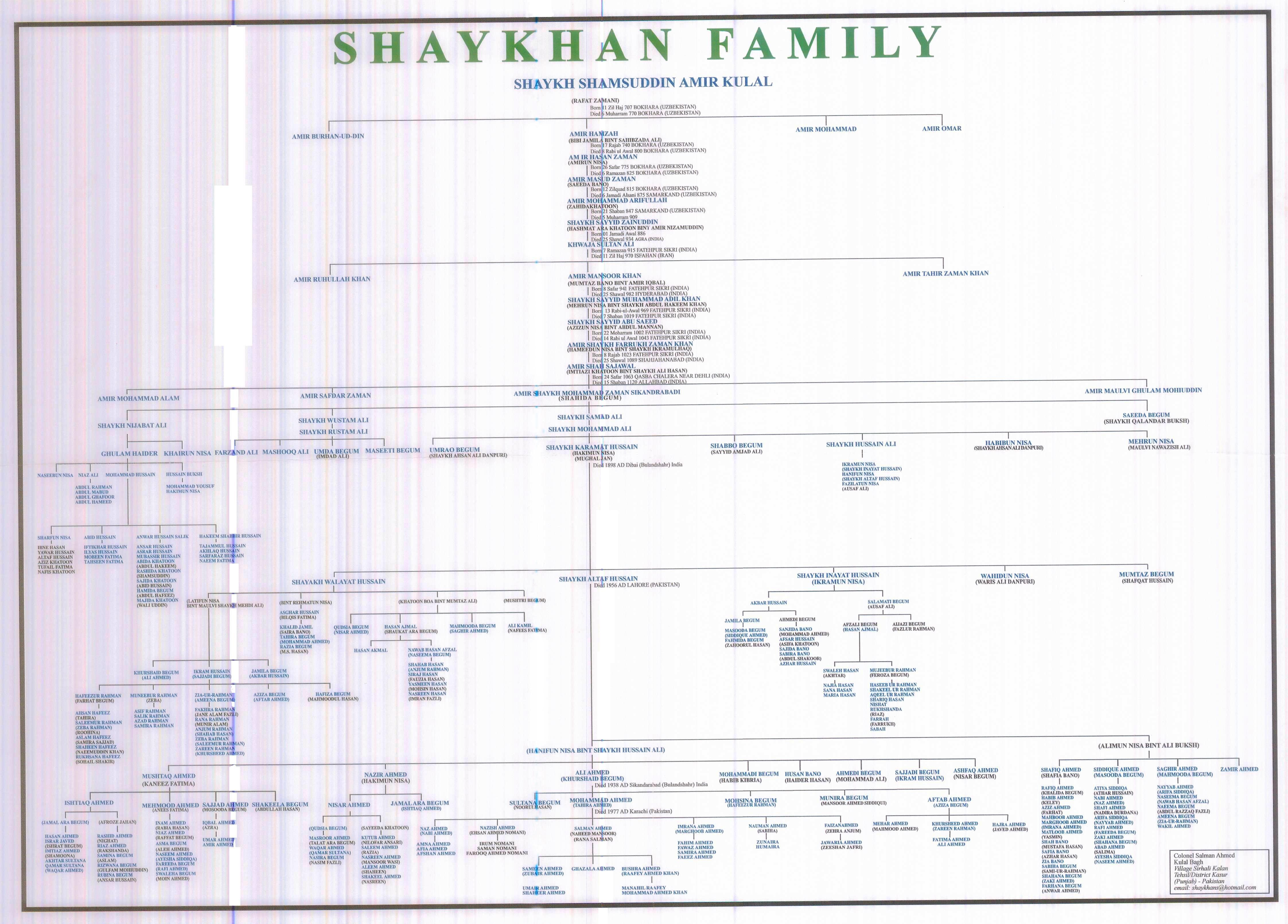
Genealogy of Shaykhan Family

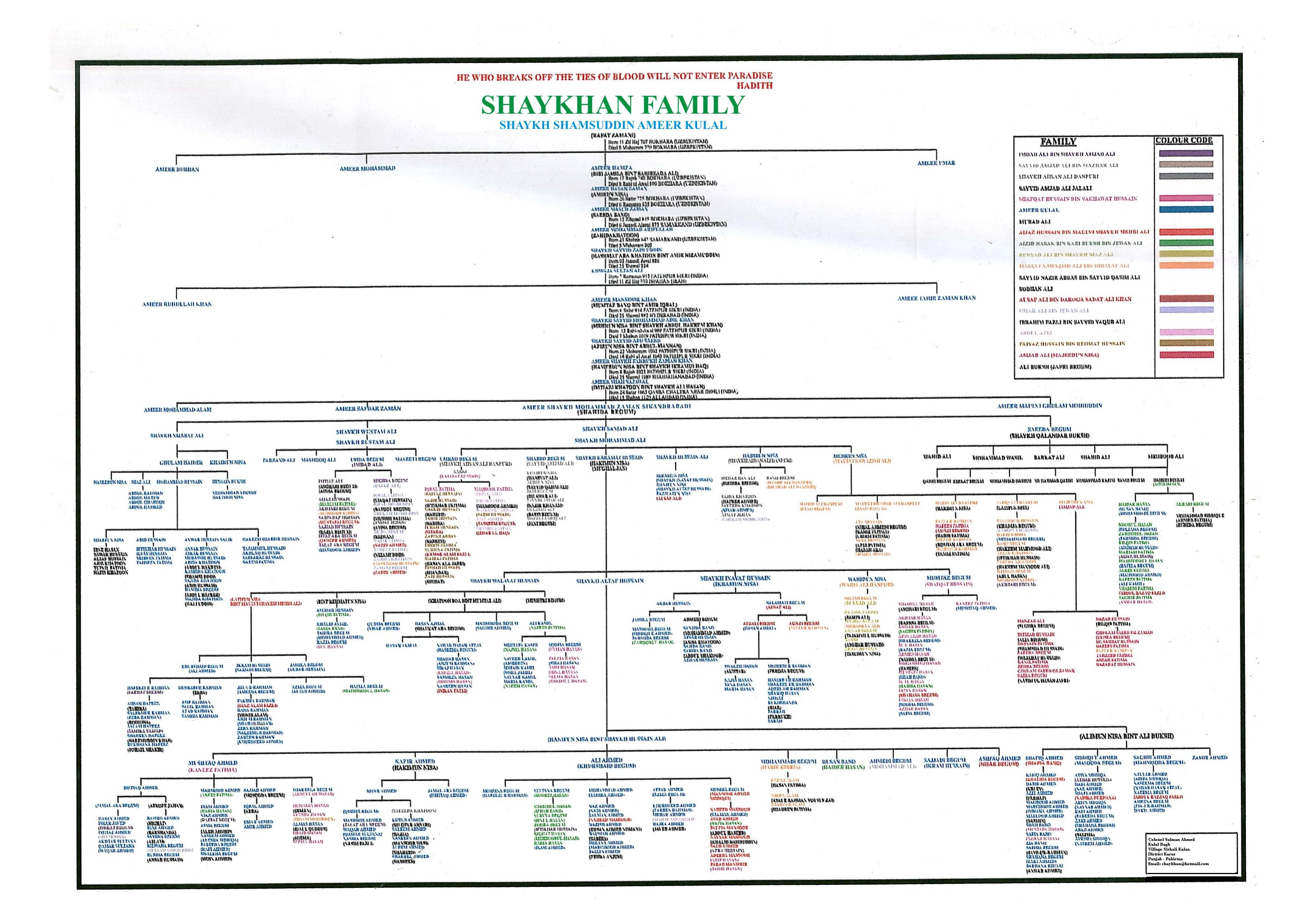
Comprehensive Genealogy of Shaykhan Family

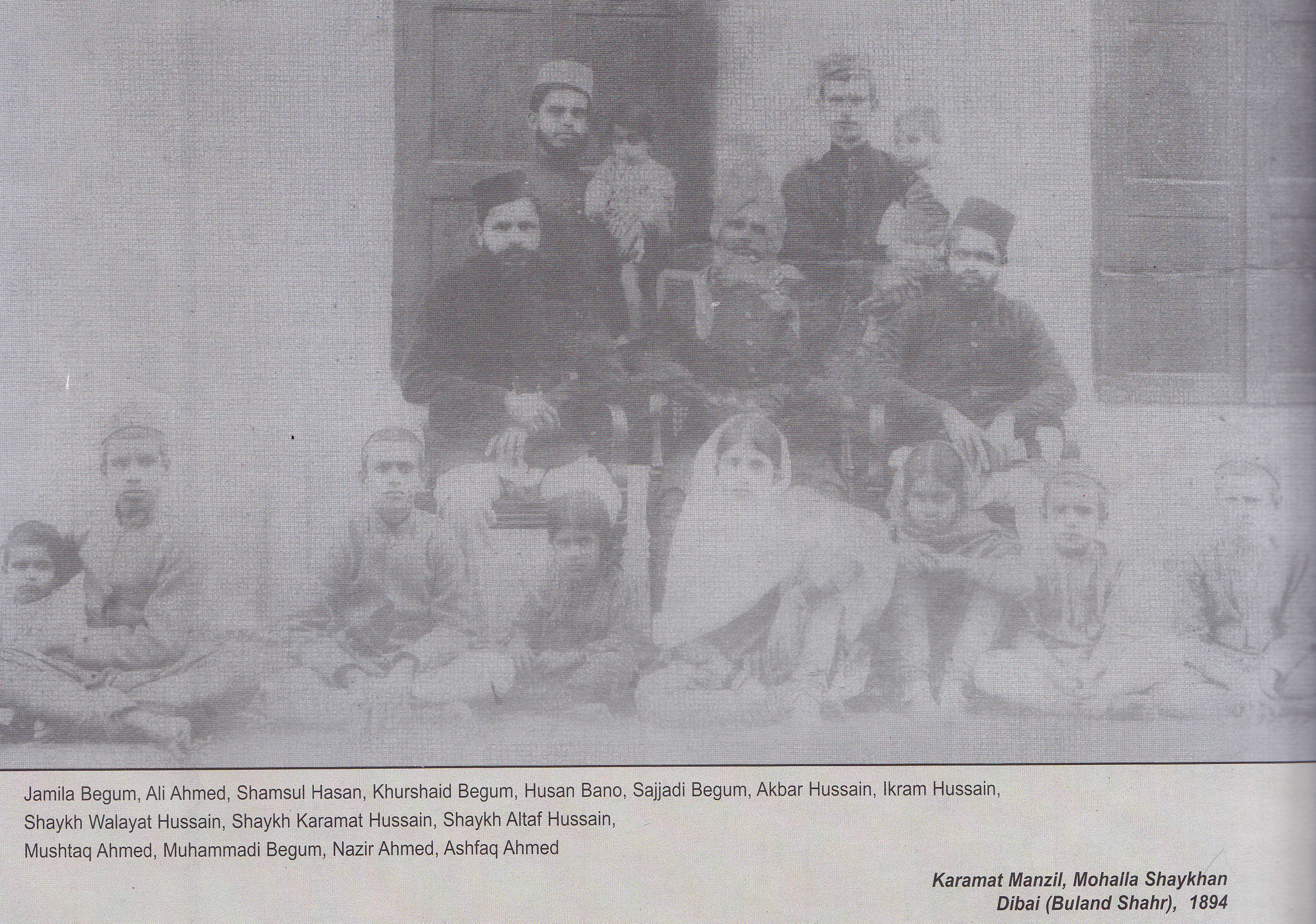
Descendants (1894 photo)

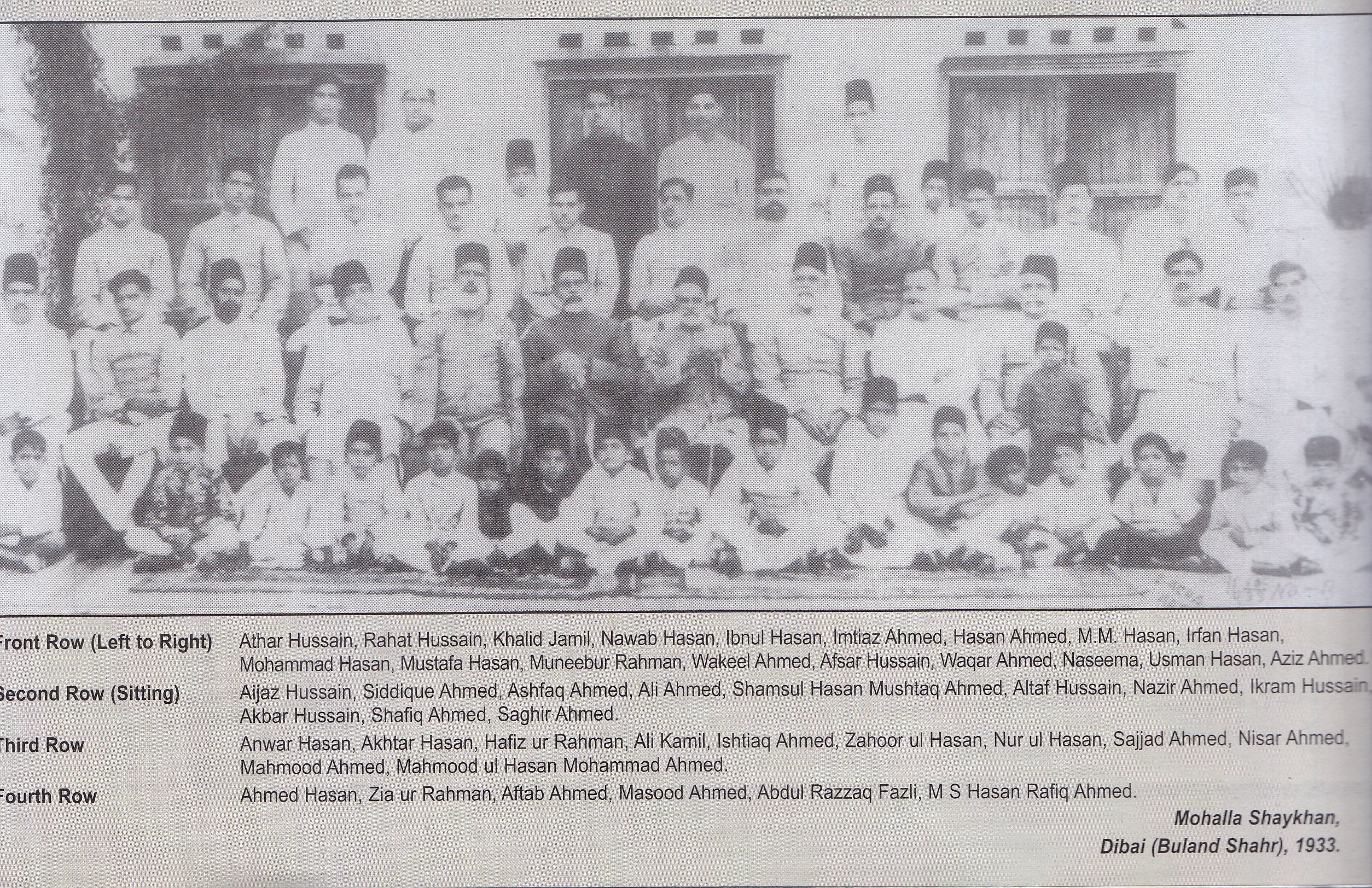
Descendants (1933 photo)

== See also ==
- Sufism
- Naqshbandi
- Islam in Uzbekistan
- Amir Timur
- Vabkent
- History of Uzbekistan
