= Shahrisabz Museum of History and Material Culture =

Museum in Shahrisabz, Uzbekistan

- Established: 1996
- Location: Shahrisabz, Uzbekistan
- Coordinates: 39.0568°N 66.8302°E
- Type: History museum
- Collections: Archaeology; ethnography; numismatics

The Shahrisabz Museum of History and Material Culture, also known as the Amir Temur Museum of Shahrisabz, is a museum in the city of Shahrisabz, Uzbekistan. It was founded in 1996 on the 660th anniversary of Amir Timur's birth and contains archaeological, ethnographic, and numismatic collections. Archeological excavations were conducted in connection with the anniversary celebrations and more than 6,500 items of mosaic, majolica, ceramic, copper, iron, and wooden carved items were collected and made part of the museum's collection. The museum is located in the historic centre of Shahrisabz, which is a UNESCO World Heritage Site.
