= Kuk Gumbaz Mosque (Qarshi) =

Mosque in Qarshi, Qashqadaryo, Uzbekistan

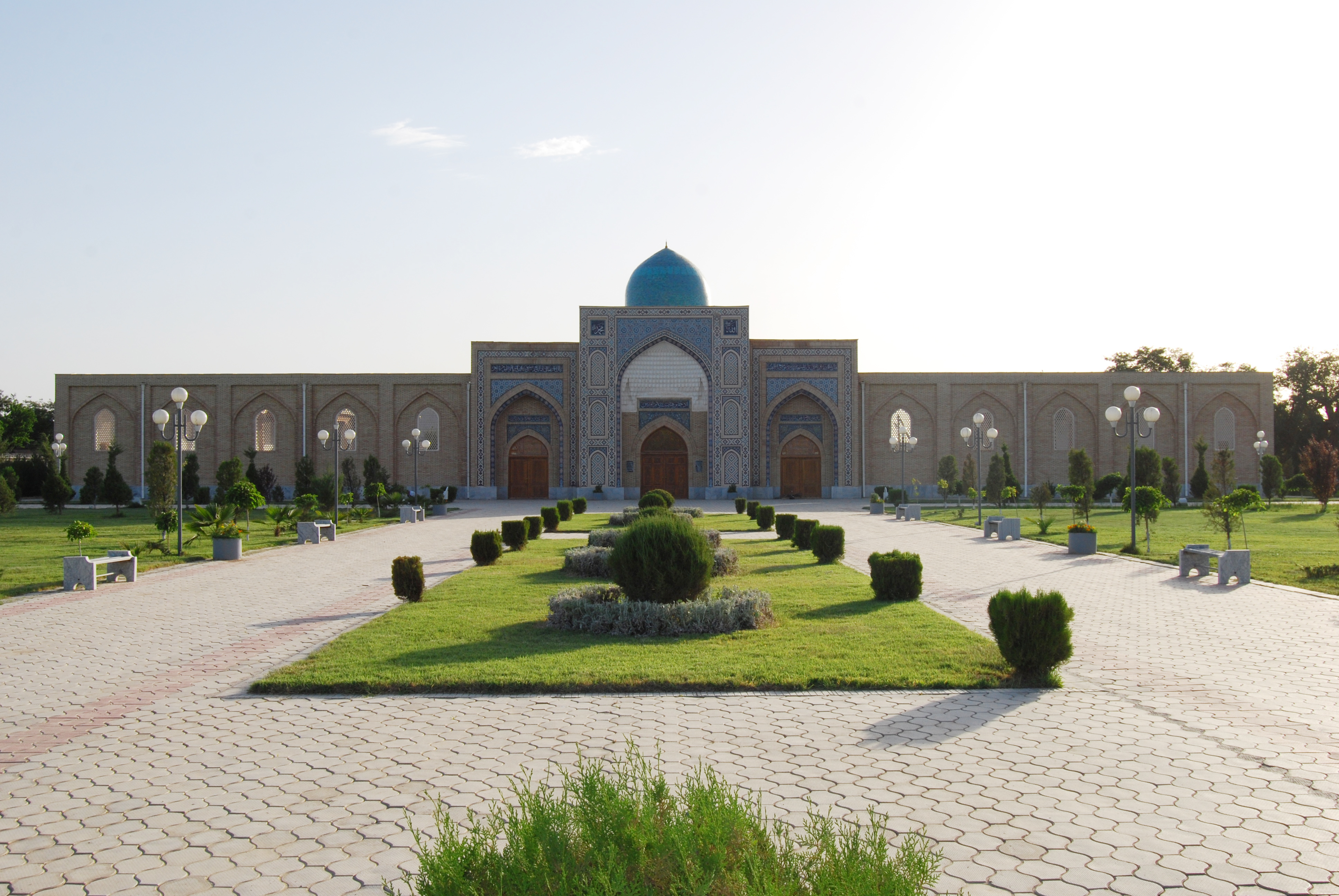
- Kuk Gumbaz Mosque (2023)
- Interactive map of the Kuk Gumbaz Mosque area

General information
- Location: Qarshi, Qashqadaryo Region, Uzbekistan
- Coordinates: 38.8638°N 65.7916°E
- Completed: 1590—1591
- Renovated: 1957, 1971, 1975, 1982, 2005–2006

Height
- Height: 14m

Technical details
- Material: baked brick

Kuk Gumbaz Mosque is an architectural monument (16th century) in the city of Qarshi, Qashqadaryo Region, Uzbekistan. By the decision of the President of the Republic of Uzbekistan on 19 December 2018, the Khojash Mahram Madrasah was included in the national list of real estate objects of tangible cultural heritage and received state protection.

== History ==
It was built at the end of the 16th century during the reign of Abdullah Khan II (1557–1598). The name of Abdullah Khan II and the year 999 AH (1590–1591) were written on the facade of the mosque. Starting from 1953, "Kuk Gumbaz" began to function again as a mosque for Friday prayers. Because the dome of the Kuk Gumbaz Mosque was covered with blue tiles, it is popularly called "Kuk Gumbaz Mosque". The mosque's blue-covered outer dome was badly damaged in the 1898 earthquake and collapsed. The mosque was renovated several times in different years, including partial renovation in 1957, 1971, 1975, and complete renovation in 1982. In 1967, the dome of the mosque was restored by master carpenter Hamdam. In 1982, the master painter from Samarkand, Nusratillo Asadov, wrote the verses from the "Mulk" chapter of the Qur'an on the top of the dome with a blue glaze tile, and installed a golden dome. In 1996, in connection with the celebration of the 660th anniversary of Amir Temur, among other historical monuments in the city of Karshi, construction and repair work was also carried out in the Kuk Gumbaz Mosque. In 2005–2006 was renovated in accordance with the decree of the President of the Republic of Uzbekistan and the decision of the government and got its current appearance. In the 20s of the 20th century, Eshon Porsokhan, Eshon Ahmadkhan, in 1930–1940s Numonkhan Qori from Samarkand, in 1956–1968 Ne'matkhan Turdimatov from Kokand, in 1968–1974 Khoji Akmalkhan Otakhanov from Namangan were the imams of mosque. Khadji Ismail Rayhonov and Rahmatullo Usmanov have been imams until now.

== Architecture ==
The complex of the Kuk Gumbaz Mosque consists of a hall with a high dome built in the shape of a murabba in the middle, and a row of buildings on both sides. The total length of the buildings was 25–38 meters. The width of the buildings in the wings was different. It was 14 meters on the north-western side, and 14.6 meters on the south-eastern side. The building was built with 26x26x5 and 28x28x6 cm bricks.

In the center of the mosque, according to the plan, the main room was 8 meters square and 14 meters high. Each wing consists of four rooms arranged in two rows. The top of the rooms is covered with domes. The front of the rooms on the top and sides of the building were once open like a porch. The rooms, in turn, were built to open to each other through arched spaces. There was a mihrab on the wall facing the qibla of the main room, and a pulpit next to it. The wall behind the building is a little wider because the mihrab was made deeper in width.

== Gallery ==
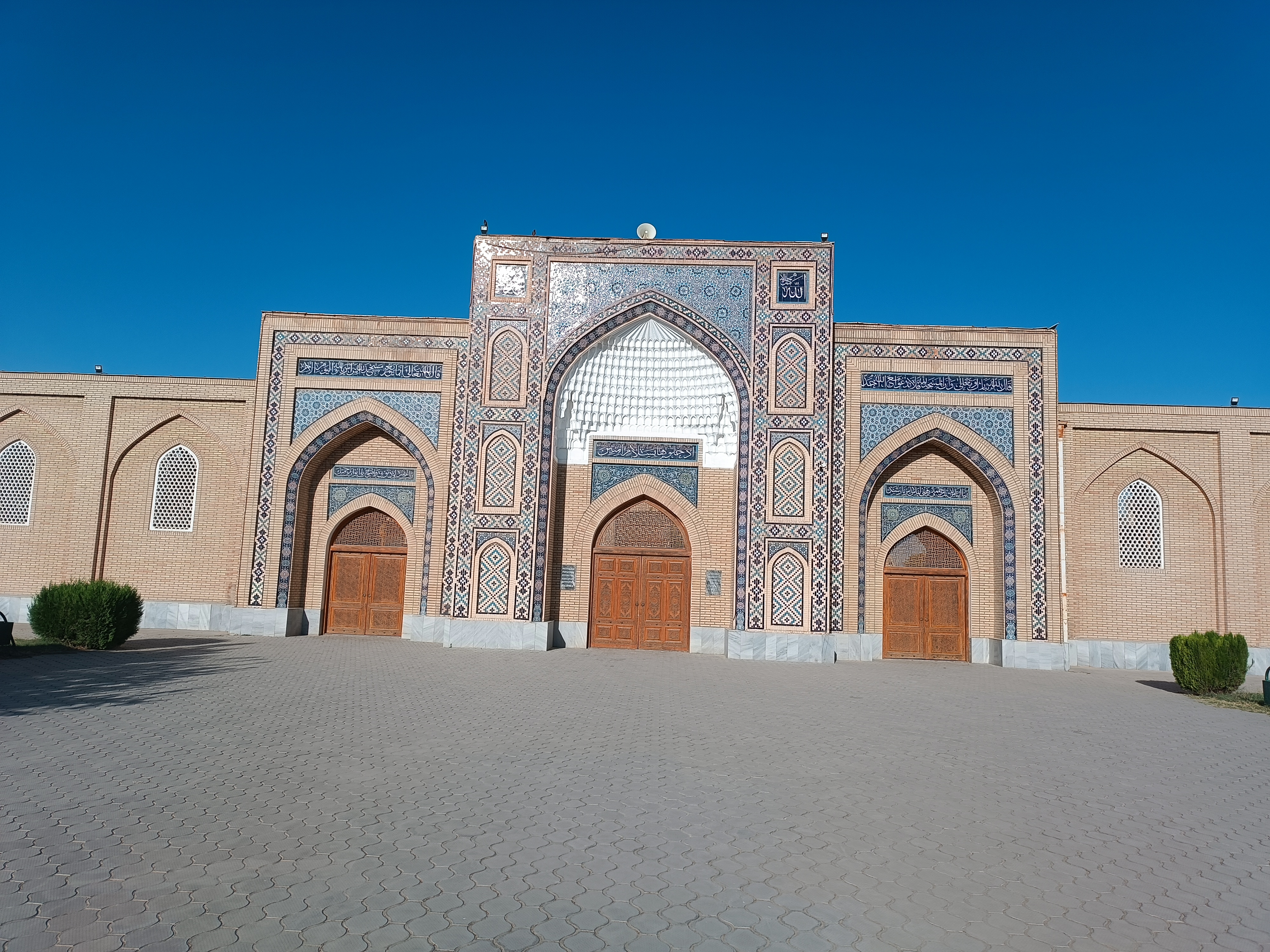
The entrance Kuk Gumbaz Mosque

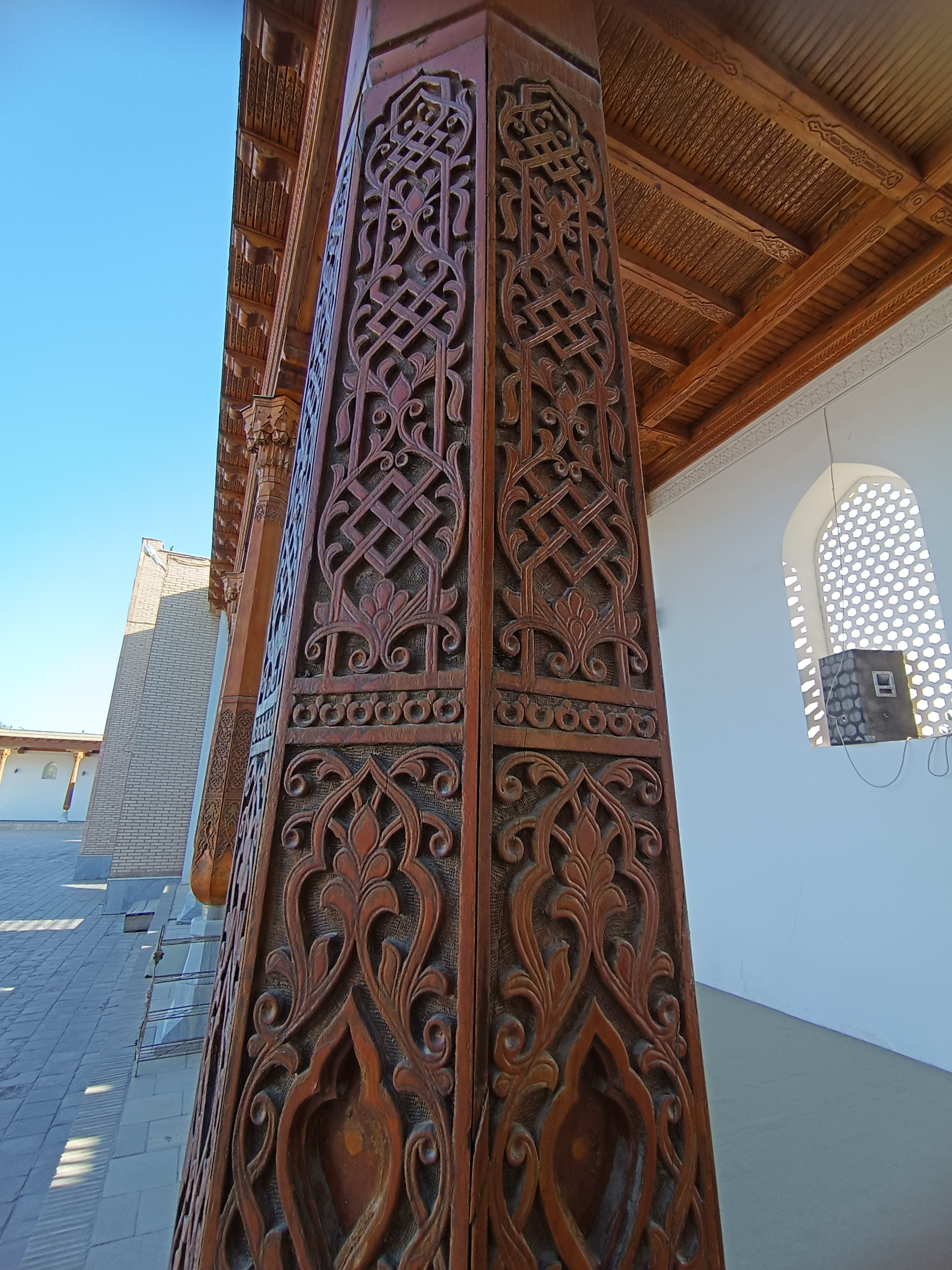
Column of the Kuk Gumbaz Mosque

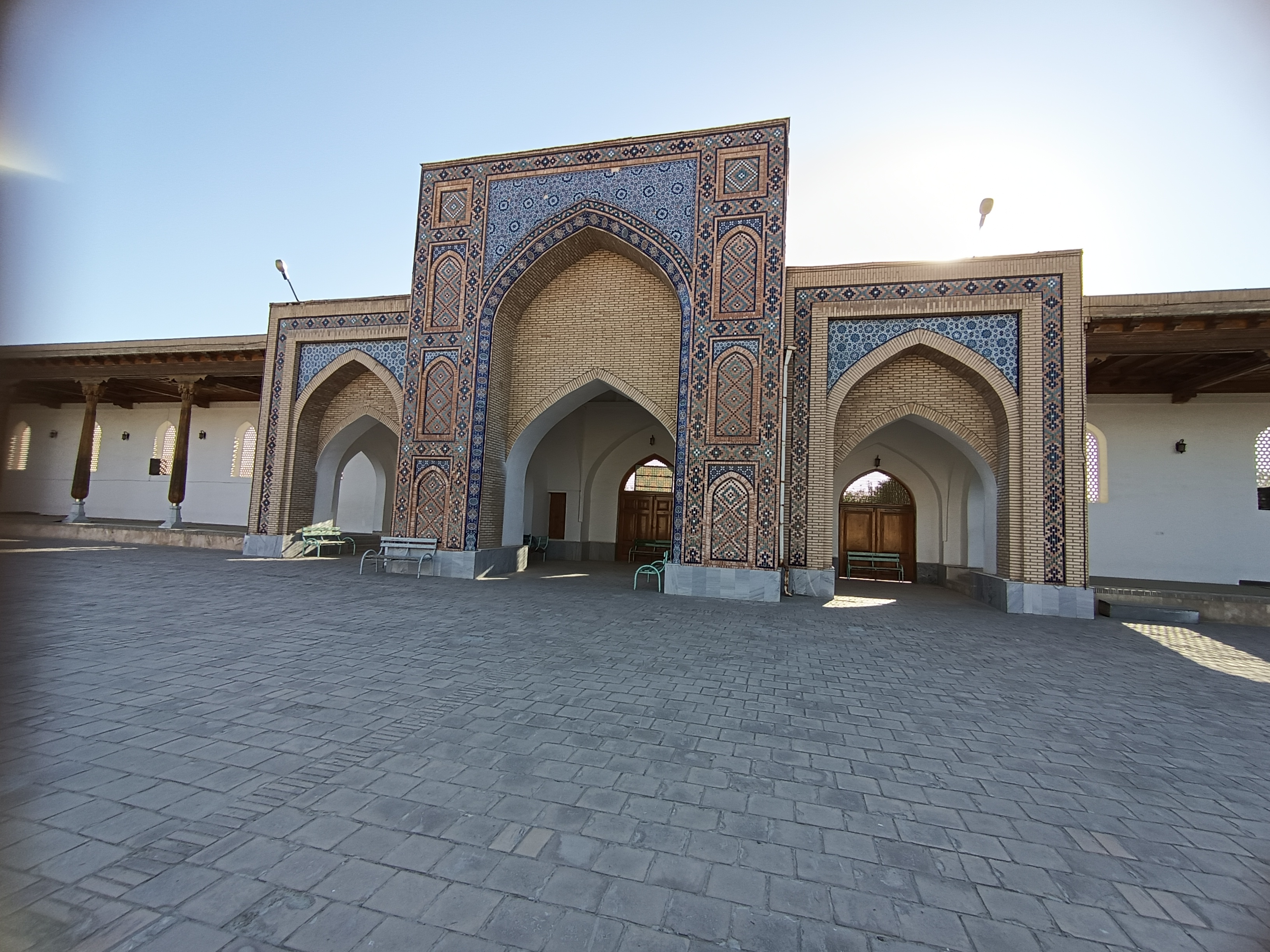
Interior of the Kuk Gumbaz Mosque

== See also ==
- Abu Mu'in an-Nasafi Memorial Complex
- Kuk Gumbaz Mosque (Shahrisabz)
