= Shahrisabz =

Shahrisabz Shahrisabz / Шаҳрисабз (Uzbek)
- District-level city
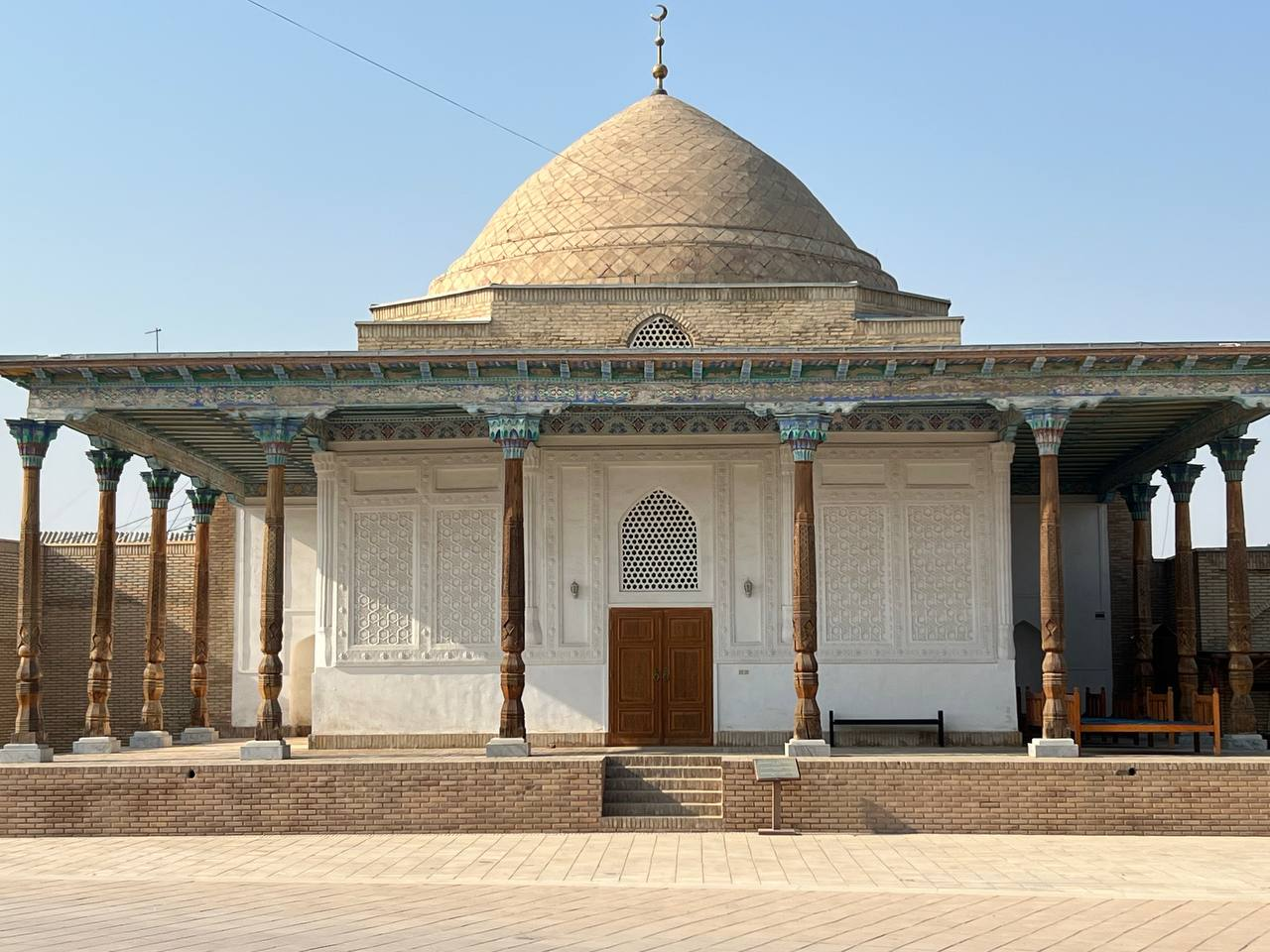
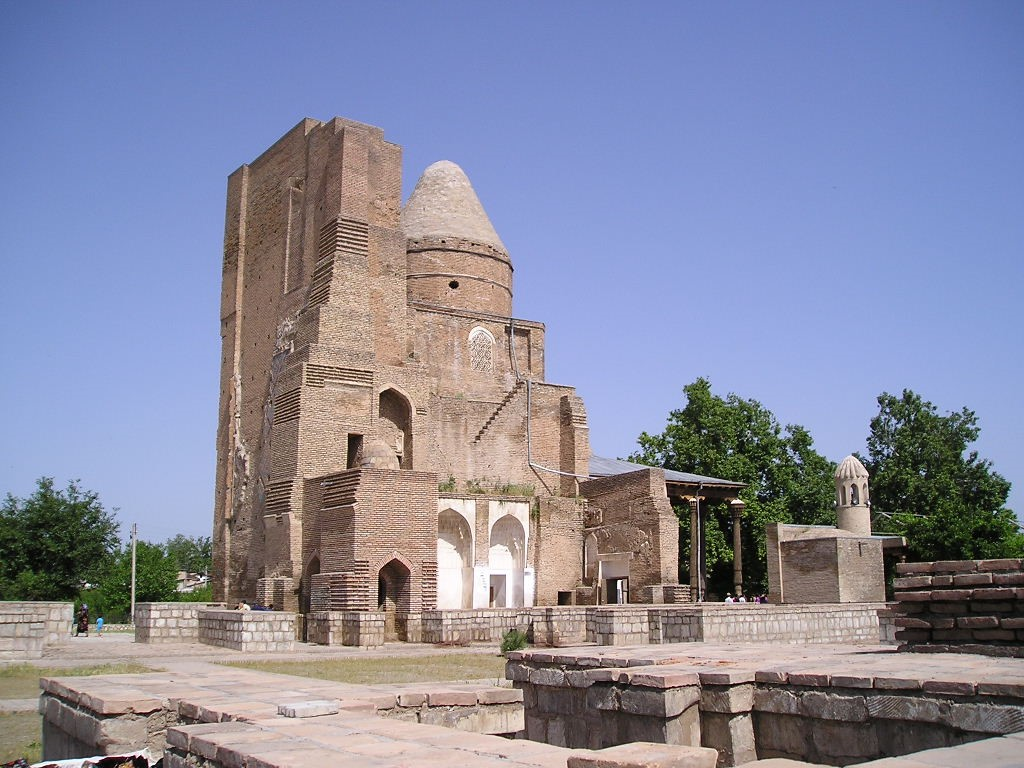
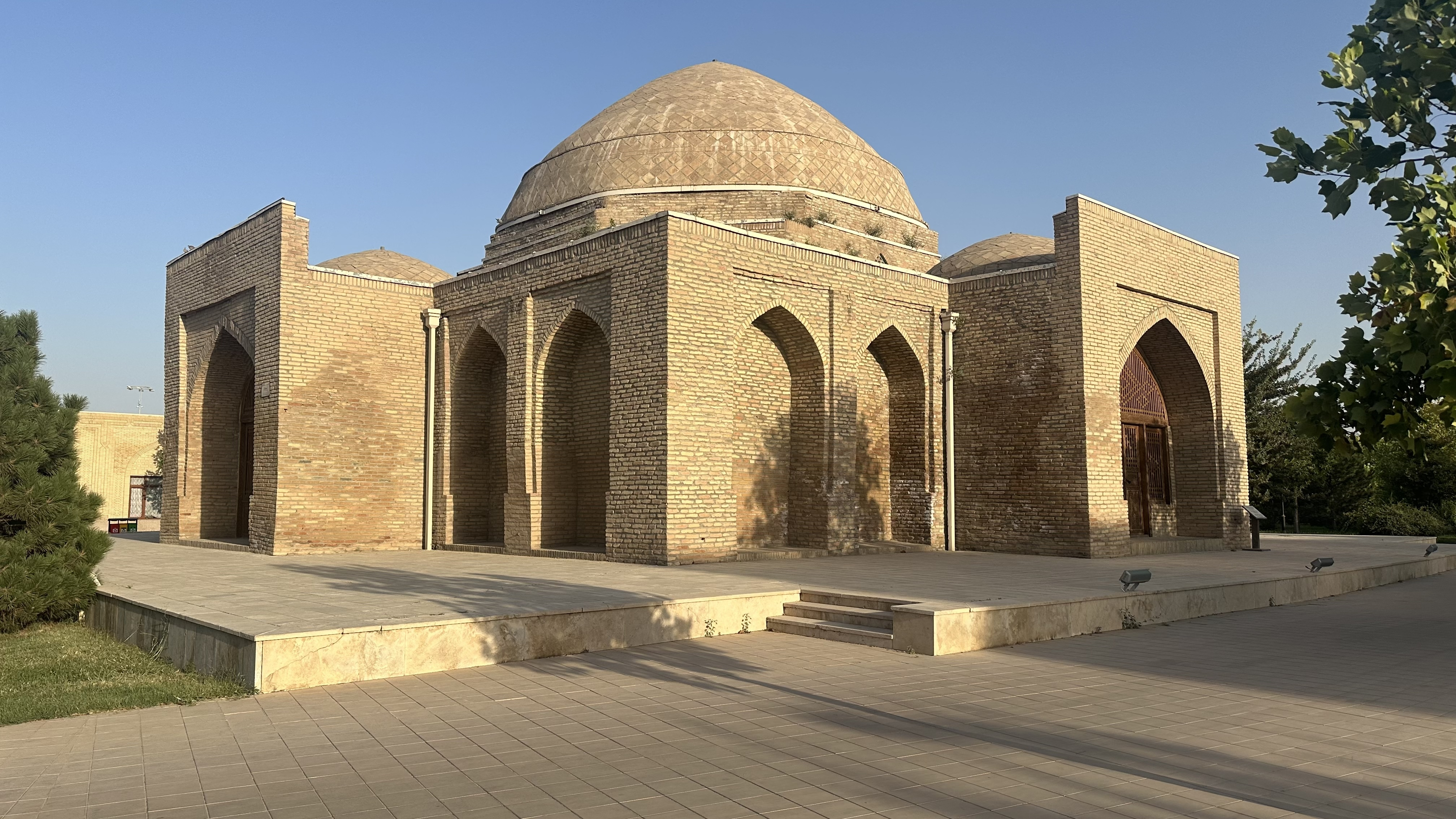
- Dorut Tilavat Complex Abdushukur Agalik Madrasah Khojamurod Bakhshi Mosque Dorus-Saodat Complex Chorsu Bazaar Ak-Saray Palace Park

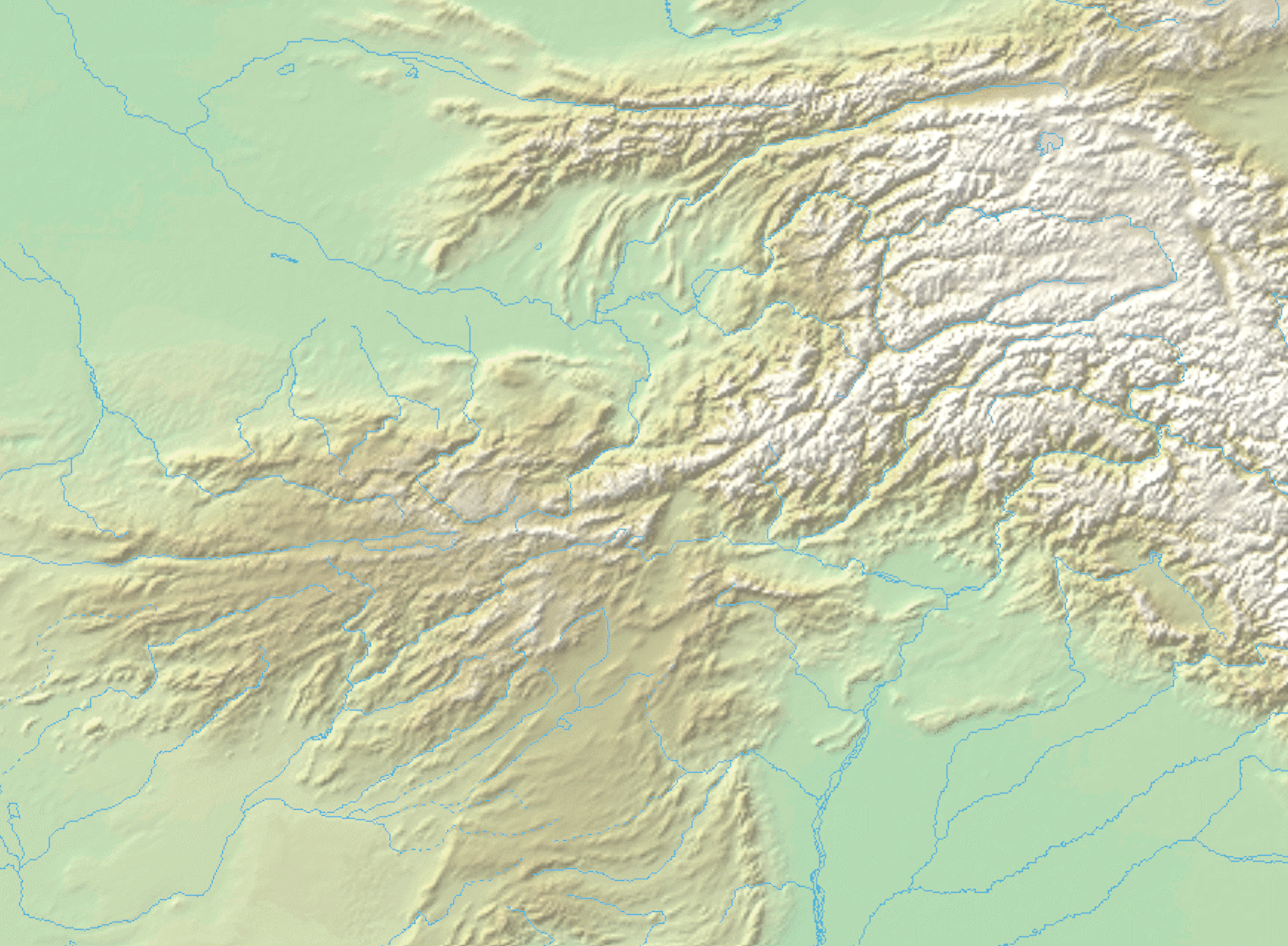
- Location within Uzbekistan Location within West and Central Asia Location within Hindu-Kush
- Coordinates: 39°03′N 66°50′E
- Country: Uzbekistan
- Region: Qashqadaryo
- Founded: 8th century BC

Government
  - Type: City Administration
  - Hokim: Sherzod Boriyev

Area
  - Total: 46.19 km^{2} (17.83 sq mi)
- Elevation: 622 m (2,041 ft)

Population (1 January 2026)
  - Total: 152,700
  - Density: 3,306/km^{2} (8,562/sq mi)
- Demonym(s): Shahrisabzlik (Uzbek); Shahrisabzian
- Time zone: UTC+5
  - Summer (DST): UZT
- Award: Order of Amir Temur (1996)
- Website: gov.uz/oz/shakhrisabzgov

UNESCO World Heritage Site
- Official name: Historic Centre of Shakhrisyabz
- Criteria: Cultural: (iii), (iv)
- Designated: 2000 (24th session)
- Reference no.: 885
- Endangered: 2016–
- Area: 240 ha (590 acres)
- Buffer zone: 82 ha (200 acres)

Shahrisabz (Note: Uzbek Cyrillic and Tajik: Шаҳрисабз, pronounced [ʃæhɾɪˈsæbz]; Persian: شهر سبز, romanized: Šahr-e-sabz; lit. 'Verdant City'; Russian: Шахрисабз) is a district-level city in Qashqadaryo Region in southern Uzbekistan. The Economic Cooperation Organization (ECO) selected Shakhrisabz as its tourism capital for 2024.

It is located approximately 80 km south of Samarkand at an elevation of 622 m. Its permanent population was 152,700 as of 1 January 2026. Historically known as Kesh or Kish, Shahrisabz was once a major city of Central Asia and was an important urban center of Sogdiana, a province of the Achaemenid Empire of Persia. It is primarily known today as the birthplace of 14th-century Turco-Mongol conqueror Timur.

== History ==
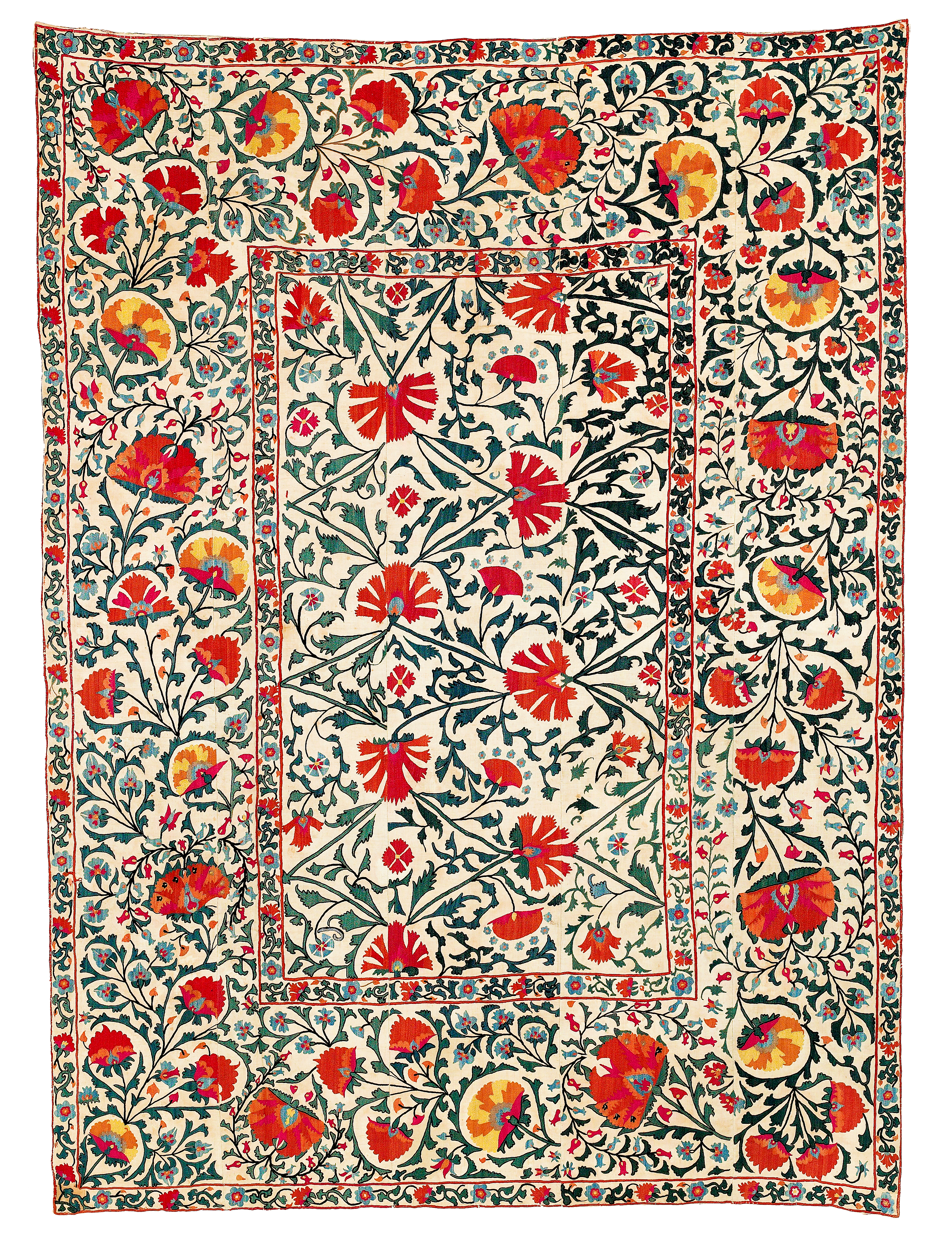
Shahrisabz suzani, first half of 19th century. Suzanis played a central role in the lives of the people of Uzbekistan. This suzani derives its particular appeal from its high proportion of light and brilliant colours: golden yellow, orange, ochre and light blue.

Formerly known as Kesh or Kish ("heart-pleasing") and tentatively identified with the ancient Nautaca, Shahrisabz is one of Central Asia’s most ancient cities. It was founded more than 2,700 years ago and formed a part of the Achaemenid Empire or Persia from the 6th to 4th centuries BC. Throughout this period Kesh remained an important urban center of Sogdiana, a major province within the Empire. Documents from the late Achaemenid period speak of the renovation of the city's walls. It has been known as Shahrisabz since the Timurid era.

Alexander the Great's general Ptolemy captured the satrap of Bactria and pretender to the Persian throne, Bessus, at Nautaca thus ending the once great Achaemenid Empire. Alexander the Great chose to spend his winters and met his wife Roxanna in the area around 328–327 BC. Between 567 and 658 AD, rulers of Kesh paid taxes to khagans of Turkic and Western Turkic khaganates. In 710 the city was conquered by the Arabs and following the Mongol conquest of Khwarezmia in the 13th century, the region came under the control of the Barlas tribe, all of whose lineages seem to have been associated with this region.

=== As part of the Turkic Kaganate ===
From the 6th to 8th centuries, Kesh was a part of the Turkic and West Turkic Kaganates. In the 8th century the ruler-malik of Khuzar (Kesh) was Turk Subugra. Under Ton-Yabgu-Kagan (618–630) the power of Turks strengthened in Sogdia. New campaigns to Tokharistan and Afghanistan pushed the borders of the state to northwestern India. Ton-Yabgu Kagan carried out administrative reform and appointed his representatives - tuduns - in the regions, including Sogdia, to monitor and control the collection of tribute. It is assumed that he issued his coins with the inscription "Tun yabgu kagan".

An ancient Turkic tribe were the Khalaj people, who in the Early Middle Ages lived in Tokharistan – the modern territories of southern Uzbekistan, Tajikistan and northern Afghanistan.

The Turks of Central Asia worshiped the following deities: Tengri (sky), Umai (Mother Goddess), Yer-sub (Earth-Water) and Erklig (Lord of Hell), among which Tengri held the predominant position. Tengri was the most important.

=== Arab conquest ===
Kesh was conquered by the Arabs in the 8th century. During the Arab invasion, the Kashkadarya Valley and especially Kesh was the epicenter of an anti-Arab and anti-Islamic liberation movement led by Al-Muqanna, known in history as the "Revolt of the Men in White Clothes".

The resistance eventually led to the decline of the capital city. Around 701–704, there were battles between Turks and Arabs at Nessef and Kesh.

During the Samanid dynasty, urban life gradually moved to the southwest of old Kesh, the site of the large village of Barknon.

=== Karakhanid era ===
In 1038, Ibrahim ibn Nasr, who also was known as Böritigin, son of the conqueror of Transoxiana, captured Chaghaniyan, from where he invaded central Transoxiana. In 1040 he conquered Kesh. By the 10th century, the Karakhanid state had a literary language that continued the traditions of ancient turkic written texts. The official Karakhanid language of the 10th century was based on the grammatical system of ancient Karluk dialects. The Islamization of the Karakhanids and their turkic subjects played a major role in the cultural development of turkic culture. In the late 10th and early 11th centuries, for the first time in the history of the turkic peoples, the Tafsir, a commentary on the Quran, was translated into the turkic language. The 11th century scholar Mahmud Kashgari laid the foundations of turkic linguistics. He lists the names of many turkic tribes of Central Asia.

One of the famous scholars was the historian Majid al-Din al-Surhakati, who wrote "History of Turkestan", which outlined the history of the Karakhanid dynasty.

During the reign of the Karakhanids, the new capital of medieval Kesh was finally formed. During the hegemony of the Khwarazmshahs (early 13th century), Kesh-Shahrisabz was first enclosed by defensive walls.

=== Modern history ===
During World War II, in 1942, the 6th Infantry Division of the Polish Anders' Army was stationed and organized in Shahrisabz, before it was evacuated from Uzbekistan to fight against Nazi Germany. There is a Polish military cemetery in the city.

== The birthplace of Timur ==
Kesh was the birthplace of Timur in between late-1320s to 1336, to the family of a minor nobility local Barlas Confederation Chief Taraqai Barlas, and during the early years of the Timurid dynasty, the city enjoyed his considerable patronage. Timur regarded Kesh as his “home town” and planned it eventually to be the location of his tomb. However, during his reign, the center of activity shifted to Samarkand instead. In the era of Timur, masterpieces of world architecture were built: the Ak-Saray palace, the Dorusiodat memorial complex. The city struggled for autonomy under Bukharan rule and the Russians helped the Bukharan emir conquering the city in 1870.

== Historical sites ==
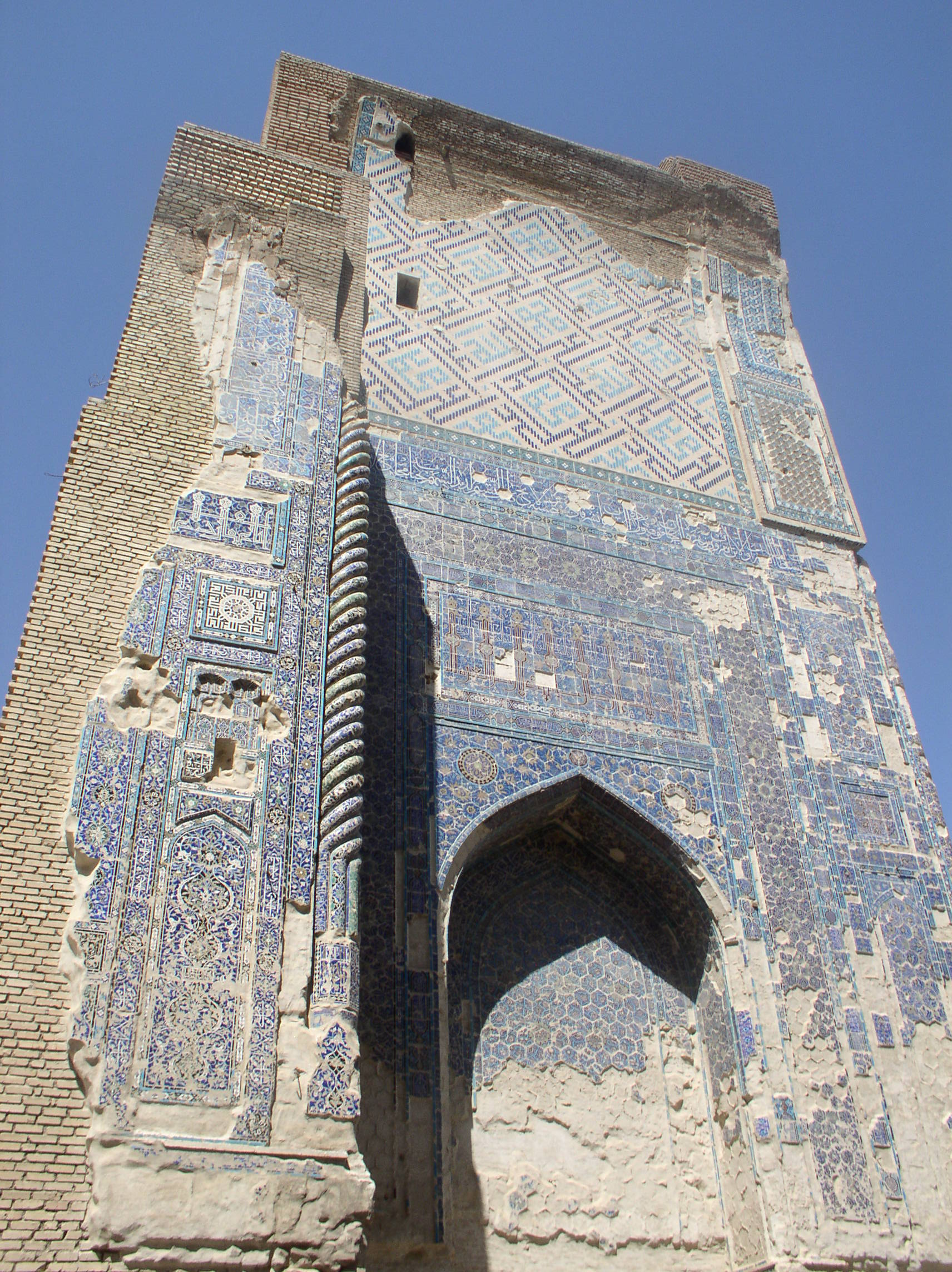
Remains of the Ak-Saray Palace

Several remaining impressive monuments from the Timurid dynasty have enabled the old part of the city to be inscribed on the UNESCO World Heritage List. However, destruction of vast areas of the medieval townscape in 2015 to create a park and tourist facilities have led to concern from UNESCO.

The Historic Centre of Shakhrisyabz was inscribed on the World Heritage List in 2000. UNESCO placed it on the List of World Heritage in Danger in 2016 because of the impact of tourism infrastructure development on the historic townscape. The World Heritage Committee retained it on the danger list in its 2026 decision 48 COM 7A.26.

- Ak-Saray Palace

Timur's Summer Palace, the “White Palace” was planned as the most grandiose of all Timur's constructions. It was started in 1380 by artisans deported by Timur from the recently conquered Khwarezm. Unfortunately, only parts of its gigantic 65 m gate-towers survive, with blue, white and gold mosaics. Above the entry of the Ak-Saray are big letters saying: "If you challenge our power – look at our buildings!"

- Kok Gumbaz Mosque / Dorut Tilovat (Dorut Tilavat) Complex

A Friday mosque built in 1437 by Ulugh Beg in honor of his father Shah Rukh, its name meaning “Blue Dome”. Located immediately behind the Kok Gumbaz Mosque is the so-called “House of Meditation”, a mausoleum built by Ulugh Beg in 1438 but apparently never used for burials.

- Hazrat-i Imam Complex

East of the Kok Gumbaz is another mausoleum complex called Dorus-Saodat (Seat of Power and Might), which contains the Tomb of Jehangir, Timur's eldest and favorite son. The adjacent mosque is said to house the tomb of a revered 8th century imam Amir Kulal.

- Tomb of Timur

Behind the Hazrat-i Imam Emsemble is a bunker with a door leading to an underground chamber, discovered by archaeologists in 1943. The room is nearly filled with a single stone casket, on which inscriptions indicate that it was intended for Timur. However, the conqueror was buried in Samarkand, not at Shahrisabz, and mysteriously, his tomb in Shahrisabz contained two unidentified corpses.

Also of interest are medieval baths and an 18th-century bazaar.

- Shahrisabz Museum of History and Material Culture

=== Archaeological sites near Kitob ===
To the north of the small village of Kumyrtepa in the Kitab District of the Kashkadarya Region, along the left bank of the small, low-water Shurabsay River, which originates from the Zarafshan Mountains, there are three hills of varying configurations running from north to south. Together, they constitute three parts of the ancient capital city of Nautaka (Padayaktepa, Uzunkyr, and Sangirtepa).

In the mid-1980s, archaeological sites in the Shurabsay micro-oasis, which are scattered within 5 kilometers of each other, were first surveyed by N.I. Krasheninnikova, a member of the KATE (Kesh Archaeological and Topographical Expedition). At that time, these three hills were identified as a citadel, the actual city, and the temple of Nautaka.

- Padayaktepa

The citadel of the city measures 270x74 meters and is located in the northern part on a high, rugged bank of the Shurabsay River. As a result of archaeological work at the site, four construction horizons have been identified. The oldest cultural layers of the settlement date back to the 9th to 8th centuries BCE. In one of the excavations in the western part of Padayaktepa, a section of a defensive wall from the Achaemenid and Hellenistic periods can be traced. These walls indicate that the city of Nautaka had an aristocratic section, enclosed by a separate wall - an acropolis, similar to the ancient site of Afrasiab in Samarkand. With the end of Alexander the Great's rule, the city was abandoned, and only the acropolis of Padayaktepa continued to be inhabited. A new city emerged on the high right bank of the Aksu River, on the site of the Kalandartepa settlement, within the boundaries of the modern city of Kitab.

- Uzunkyr

Remnants of the fortification wall of the city are visible near the village of Kumyrtepa in the form of a low mound measuring more than 650 meters in length and 20 meters in width. At one time, this wall encircled the entire city, covering an area of more than 70 hectares. The original wall of the settlement was constructed from adobe-like raw bricks dating back to the 10th-9th centuries BCE, which were characteristic of ancient cities in Sogd, such as Koktepa, and Kesh. Later, during the rule of the Achaemenid, Seleucid, and Greco-Bactrian kingdoms, extensive repairs were carried out on the fortification walls of the city.

- Sangirtepa

A standalone hill, located beyond the city walls, is situated about 650 meters to the southwest of Uzunkyr. It consists of a central hill with dimensions of 84x62 meters and a height of around 8 meters. The surrounding wall encloses an area within 3 hectares. Archaeological excavations have been conducted on this site by the Department of Archaeology at Tashkent State University (now the National University of Uzbekistan) since 1983. As a result of these excavations at Sangirtepa, a unique Zoroastrian temple was uncovered, featuring a hall in the center, an altar, and auxiliary rooms. The temple is one of the oldest religious structures in Central Asia.

== Administration and population ==
Shahrisabz is administered separately from Shahrisabz District. The city hokimiyat was established under Presidential Resolution No. PP-3124 of 11 July 2017. Its official website is hosted on the government portal.

According to the National Statistics Committee, the city's permanent population was 147,200 in 2024, 150,100 in 2025 and 152,700 on 1 January 2026.

== Culture and tourism ==
The Economic Cooperation Organization selected Shahrisabz as its tourism capital for 2024 at a meeting of tourism ministers in December 2022.

In August 2026, Uzbekistan's Tourism Committee reported that the World Crafts Council had recognised Shahrisabz as a World Craft City for embroidery. The announcement was made at the closing ceremony of the international IROQI embroidery festival.

The city received the Order of Amir Temur in 1996.

== Economy ==
The city's economy is primarily focused on the processing of agricultural raw materials, including cotton cleaning and canning, among other activities. Additionally, traditional and cottage industries are well-developed in the area.

== Climate ==
Shahrisabz has a Mediterranean climate (Köppen: Csa) with chilly winters and very hot, dry summers.

Climate data for Shahrisabz (1991–2020)
Month	Jan	Feb	Mar	Apr	May	Jun	Jul	Aug	Sep	Oct	Nov	Dec	Year
Mean daily maximum °C (°F)	9.0 (48.2)	11.4 (52.5)	16.9 (62.4)	22.9 (73.2)	28.8 (83.8)	34.8 (94.6)	36.9 (98.4)	35.5 (95.9)	30.6 (87.1)	23.6 (74.5)	16.1 (61.0)	10.9 (51.6)	23.1 (73.6)
Daily mean °C (°F)	3.6 (38.5)	5.5 (41.9)	10.8 (51.4)	16.5 (61.7)	21.9 (71.4)	27.3 (81.1)	29.4 (84.9)	27.5 (81.5)	22.1 (71.8)	15.4 (59.7)	9.3 (48.7)	5.1 (41.2)	16.2 (61.2)
Mean daily minimum °C (°F)	−0.2 (31.6)	1.1 (34.0)	6.1 (43.0)	11.0 (51.8)	15.5 (59.9)	19.7 (67.5)	21.7 (71.1)	19.6 (67.3)	14.5 (58.1)	9.0 (48.2)	4.5 (40.1)	1.1 (34.0)	10.3 (50.5)
Average precipitation mm (inches)	71.8 (2.83)	86.0 (3.39)	98.2 (3.87)	80.8 (3.18)	45.0 (1.77)	7.2 (0.28)	1.1 (0.04)	1.2 (0.05)	2.7 (0.11)	18.4 (0.72)	60.2 (2.37)	62.2 (2.45)	534.8 (21.06)
Average precipitation days (≥ 1.0 mm)	14	13	15	12	9	4	1	1	2	6	10	12	99
Mean monthly sunshine hours	115.1	133.3	170.1	232.0	305.1	349.9	377.1	361.8	308.7	243.2	154.3	120.1	2,870.7
Source: NOAA

== In music ==
Shahrisabz was celebrated in the well-known eponymous song by the Uzbek VIA "Yalla," with music by Farrukh Zokirov and lyrics by Yevgeny Berezikov.

== See also ==
- List of World Heritage Sites in Uzbekistan
