= Dorut Tilavat =

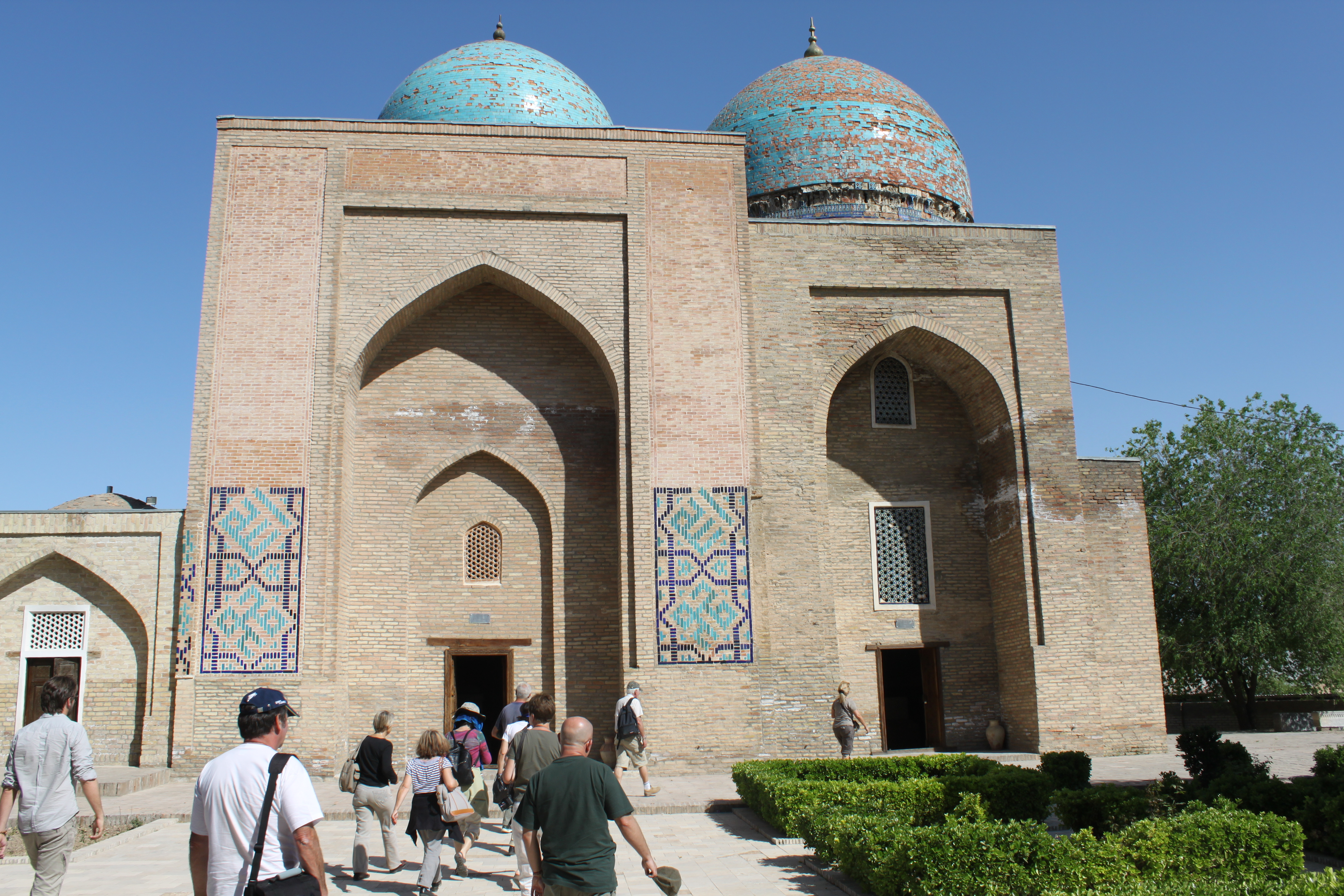
Gumbazi Sayidon Mausoleum (right), Shamsuddin Kulol Mausoleum (left)

Dor-i-Tilavat (the place where the Qur'an is read and recited) - in the center of Shahrisabz, in the west of the Darussiodat complex, there is a complex consisting of ancient structures belonging to the Timurid dynasty - the tomb of Shamsuddin Kulol, Gumbazi Sayyidon, and the Blue Dome Mosque, built on the site of the old madrasa here.

== History ==
The mausoleum within the complex, established by Amir Timur, is the final resting place for Shaykh Shamsiddin Kulol, a revered spiritual leader who died in 1370. Later, his father, Amir Tarag'oy, was also interred by his feet. The construction of the mausoleum took place during the reign of Ulugh Beg. Adjacent to it, there is a mosque, and to the south, another mausoleum was built. Inscriptions within the mausoleum bear the words: "This mausoleum of the great saints (rulers) a summit in justice and knowledge, in religion and belief, there is no equal to the high and noble Hazrat Sultan Ulugh Beg Karagi. It was constructed with the order of Allah for his sovereignty and rule to be long-lasting, 841 Hijri year," and these inscriptions have been preserved to this day. Inside the mausoleum, several saghanas (gravestones) have been placed, which were transferred from a supplementary cemetery in the 15th and 18th centuries. The names of certain virtuous Sayyids have been inscribed on some of these gravestones.

== Completion of the complex in the reign of Ulugh Beg ==
During the reign of Ulugh Beg (1394-1449), a mausoleum with a dome was erected over the burial place of Shamsuddin Kulol. During archeological research, double walls of the mausoleum were discovered, which confirmed the indication in historical sources that the basis for the tomb of Shamsuddin Kulol was the building of an old mosque of X-XII centuries.

In 1435-1436 Ulugh Beg on behalf of his father Shahruh (according to the inscription on the portal) builds a mosque on the system of "kosh" - opposite Shamsuddin Kulol's mausoleum. The spacious square hall of the new mosque was covered with a large dome covered with blue tiles. Therefore, the mosque was called Kok Gumboz ("Blue Dome") and played the role of Friday cathedral mosque of Shahrisabz.

To the right and left of the main room of the building were wings of canopies supported by pillars, which could accommodate a large number of worshippers. The entrance peshtak faces east. The decorative design was very restrained in contrast to other buildings of Ulugh Beg, with the inscription: "The rule belongs to Allah, wealth belongs to Allah". A small minaret was built in the courtyard part.

The Dorut Tilavat complex received its final design in 1438. At that time, close to the mausoleum of Shamsuddin Kulol, Ulugh Beg began the construction of a mausoleum for relatives and descendants of Ulugh Beg himself, as the inscription under the dome informs. The building is graceful, slender, with a high drum on which the outer dome, which was lancet at that time, rested.

Ancient inscriptions on marble tombstones mentioning the names of sayids have been preserved. Hence the name of the mausoleum - Gumbazi sayidon ("Sayid Dome").

Thus, around the closed inner courtyard of Dorut Tilavat madrasa during XIV-XV centuries the united memorial complex was formed, which consists of Shamsuddin Kulol mausoleum, the madrasa itself with Emir Taragay gurkhana, mosque and dynasty tomb.

== Structure ==
The current appearance of the Dorut Tilovat complex is described as a square with a total area of 500 m^{2}, and this area stands at a height of 2.25 meters above the city surface. Some of the architectural elements within the complex resemble those found in Shah-i-Zinda. The Dorut Tilovat complex includes the mausoleum of Shamsuddin Kulol, the mausoleum of Gumbazi Sayidon, and the Kok Gumbaz Jami Mosque.

=== Shamsuddin Kulol Mausoleum ===
The mausoleum of Shamsuddin Kulol is considered the oldest structure within the complex. Its construction began in 1373 under the order of Amir Timur. The construction work was completed in 1374. According to Sharaf al-Din Ali Yazdi, the cemetery of Shamsuddin Kulol, as well as the grave of Amirzoda Umarshaykh Mirzon, is also located at this site. This grave is located on the qibla side of the mausoleums of Shamsuddin Kulol and Amir Tarog'oy. In 1376, Amir Timur's eldest son, Mirzo Jahangir, was also buried at this location. Whenever Amir Timur visited the city of Shahrisabz, he and his family would visit the graves of Shamsuddin Kulol, his father Amir Tarog'oy, his son, and other relatives.

=== Gumbazi Sayidon Mausoleum ===
The Gumbazi Sayidon mausoleum is situated in the southern part of the Dorut Tilovat complex. The construction of the mausoleum's walls was completed between 1437 and 1438, and the mausoleum was built under the orders of Mirza Ulugh Beg.

=== Kok Gumbaz Jami Mosque ===
Located in the opposite direction from the mausoleums of Shamsuddin Kulol and Gumbazi Sayidon, the Kok Gumbaz Jami Mosque stands tall. This mosque was built under the rule of Mirzo Ulugh Beg, under the order of his father, Shahrukh Mirzo, who was the ruler of Khurasan. Various inscriptions were written on the walls of the mosque, including the ones in Suls and Kufic scripts.

== Archaeological research ==
In the years 1994 to 1996, archaeological excavations revealed the remnants of decayed walls on either side of the Jame Mosque of Dorut Tilovat. These findings included the ruins of a madrasa, a gatehouse, and portions of the walls surrounding the minaret. The restoration work was carried out on the mosque's facades, part of the madrasa, and the minaret in an effort to preserve and restore the historical appearance of the complex. Similar restoration efforts have also been conducted on the Kok Gumbaz and Gumbazi Sayidon mausoleums.
