= Mujaddidi Order =

Sufi mystic order in Sunni Islam

- الطريقة المجددية al-Ṭarīqa al-Mujaddidīyya
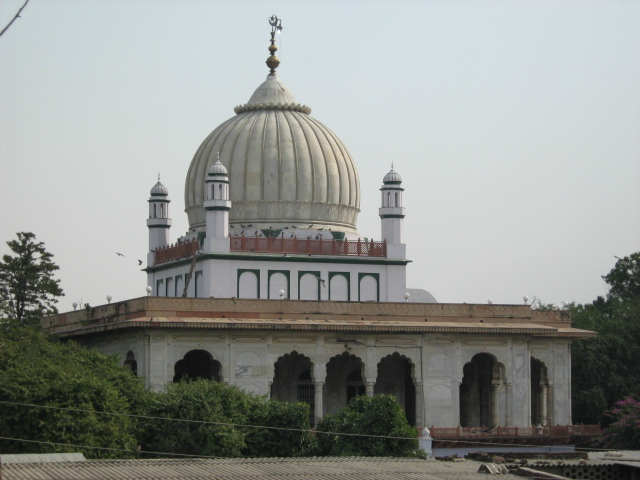
- The shrine of Ahmad Sirhindi
- Abbreviation: Mujaddidīya
- Type: Sufi order
- Classification: Sunni Islam
- Region: Indian sub-continent, Middle East
- Founder: Ahmad Sirhindi
- Origin: 17th century Mughal Empire
- Branched from: Naqshbandi

The Mujaddidi Order (Arabic: مجددی; Mujaddidīyya) or the Naqshbandiyya-Mujaddidiyya (Persian: نقشبندیه مجددیه; Naqshbandīyya-Mujaddidīyya) is a prominent and major reformist branch of the Naqshbandi Sufi order, one of the major spiritual lineages (tariqa) of Sunni Islam. It was established in the 17th century by the Indian Islamic scholar and sufi mystic Shaykh Ahmad Sirhindi (1564–1624), who is widely venerated as Mūjaddīd al-Alf al-Thanī (The Reviver of the Second millennium).

The order originated in the Mughal Empire as a reformist movement aimed at revitalizing Sunni orthodoxy within Sufism. It is distinguished from other Sufi lineages by its emphasis on the strict adherence to Islamic law (Sharia), its rejection of religious innovation (bid'ah), and its philosophical adherence to Wahdat al-Shuhud ("Unity of Witness") as opposed to the concept of Wahdat al-Wujud ("Unity of Being") prevalent in other orders.

By the 18th and 19th centuries, the Mujaddidi lineage had become the dominant branch of the Naqshbandi Order, spreading from India to Central Asia, the Ottoman Empire, China and the broader Islamic world.

== History ==
=== Origin ===
The order traces its spiritual genealogy (silsila) through the Naqshbandi chain back to the Islamic prophet Muhammad through the first Caliph Abu Bakr and later through the 14th-century mystic Baha' ad-Din Naqshband Bukhari, distinguishing it from most other Sufi orders which trace their lineage through Ali ibn Abi Talib. In the late 16th century, the Naqshbandi order was introduced to India by Khawaja Baqi Billah (1564–1603).

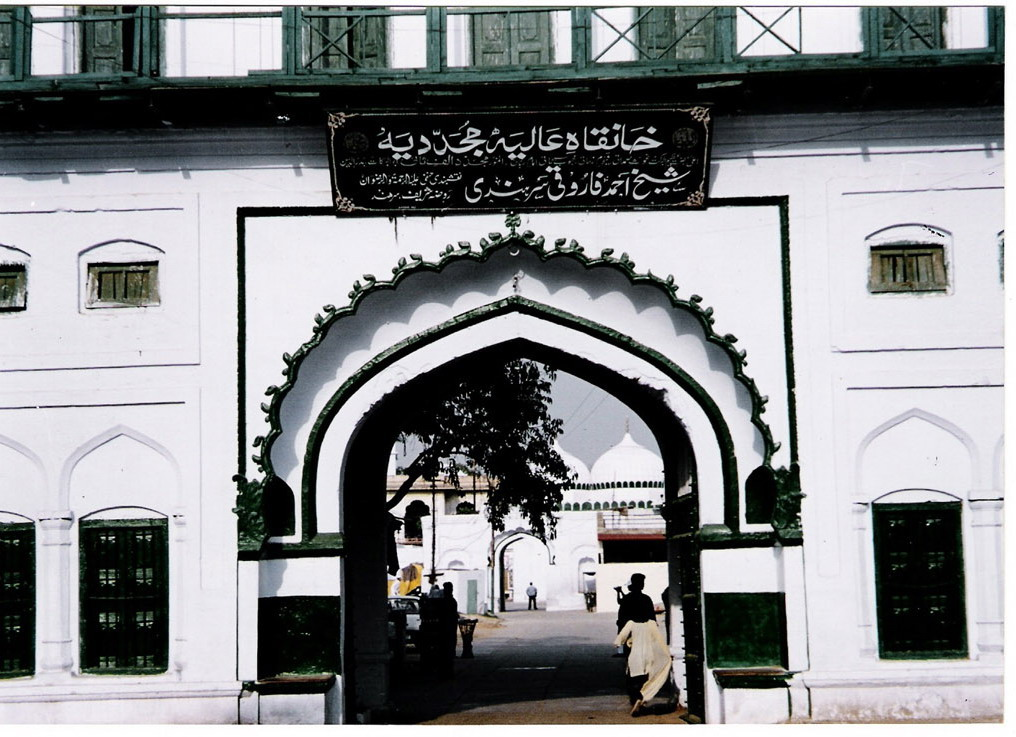
Mosque and tomb of Ahmad Sirhindi in Punjab, India;founder of the Naqshbandiyya-Mujaddidiyya sufi order also known as Mujaddidi order.

The specific Mujaddidi branch began with Ahmad Sirhindi, a disciple of the Naqshbandi master Khawaja Baqi Billah in Delhi. During the reign of the Mughal Emperor Akbar (r. 1556–1605), Sirhindi became critical of the syncretic religious environment of the court, particularly the Din-i Ilahi and the influence of pantheistic philosophy on Indian Sufism, which he viewed as a threat to Islamic monotheism.

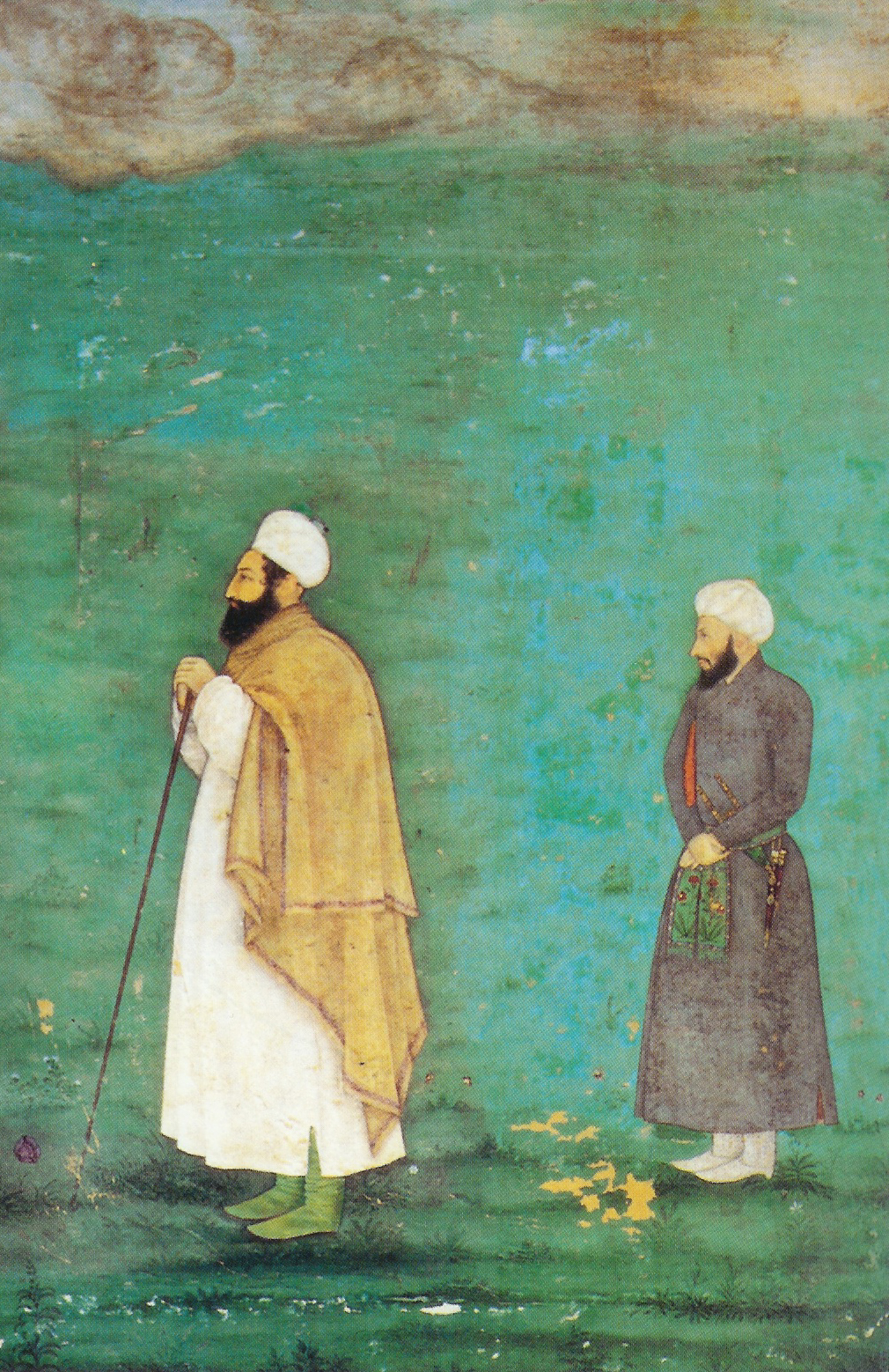
Painting of Shaykh Ahmad al-Faruqi al-Sirhindi; c. 16th–17th century

After Baqi Billah's death, Sirhindi organized the order to focus on spiritual purification through strict observance of the Sunnah and the elimination of bid'ah (religious innovations). His efforts to revitalize Islam earned him the title Mujaddid Alf-e-Sani and his specific lineage became known as the Naqshbandīyya-Mujaddidīyya. His letters, collected as the Māktūbat-i Rābbanī and his speeches and lectures known as Khūtbat-e-Mujaddidīyya, laid the foundational texts for the order.

=== Mughal era and Expansion ===
Following Sirhindi's death, the order was propagated by his sons and deputies (khalifas), most notably Khawāja Muḥammad Maʿṣūm (d. 1668), who is credited with expanding the order's influence into Central Asia and the Middle East. It gained significant traction among the Muslim elite and the Mughal nobility, serving as a counter-movement to the more liberal and syncretic Qadiri and Chishti orders favored by Shahzada Dara Shikoh. The Mujaddidi order became influential in the Mughal court, particularly during the reign of Emperor Aurangzeb (r. 1658–1707), who was a patron of the order and a disciple of Muhammad Masum's son, Khawaja Saifuddin.

In the 18th and 19th centuries, the order continued to evolve. Mirza Mazhar Jan-e-Janaan (1699–1781) founded the Mazhari sub-branch, which further refined the order's spiritual practices. His disciple, Shah Ghulam Ali (1743–1824), was instrumental in training Khâlid-i Baghdâdî, a Kurd who took the Mujaddidi teachings to the Ottoman lands, establishing the Khalidi sub-order. The Khalidīyya-Mujaddidīyya branch eventually became one of the most widespread Sufi networks in the Islamic world, influencing regions from Turkey to Indonesia.

== Teachings and methodology ==
=== Wahdat ash-Shuhud ===
A central pillar of Mujaddidi theology is the concept of Wahdat ash-Shuhūd ("Unity of Witness" or "Apparentism"). This was proposed by Ahmad Sirhindi as a critique of Waḥdat al-Wujūd ("Unity of Being"), a doctrine associated with Ibn Arabi that suggests that God and creation are ultimately one reality.

Sirhindi argued that the doctrine of Ibn Arabi is incompatible with Islam. In his book, Ahmad Sirhindi criticized the doctrine of Waḥdat al-Wujūd, by saying in his book, Al-Muntakhabaat Min Al-Maktubaat, that God is never united with anything, and nothing can be united with God. Ahmad Sirhindi argued that forms of pantheism were components of Hinduism. He rejected the core idea of Ibn Arabi that the creation could unite with the Creator, i.e., God.

Despite this, Sirhindi still used Ibn al-'Arabi's vocabulary without hesitation. William C. Chittick, an expert of Ibn 'Arabi biography, argued that Ahmad Sirhindi seems oblivious of Ibn 'Arabi doctrines, as he insisted that Wahdat al-Wujūd were "inadequate expression" which should be supplanted by his concept of Wahdat ash-Shuhūd which Chittick claimed is just similar in essence. Ahmad Sirhindi advanced the notion of Wahdat ash-Shuhūd (oneness of appearance). According to this doctrine, the experience of unity between God and creation is purely subjective and occurs only in the mind of the Sufi who has reached the state of fana' fi Allah (to forget about everything except Almighty Allah). Sirhindi considered Wahdat ash-Shuhūd to be superior to Wahdat al-Wujūd (oneness of being), which he understood to be a preliminary step on the way to the Absolute Truth.

=== Adherence to Sunnah ===
The order places a paramount emphasis on Ittiba-i Sunnah (following the prophetic tradition). Unlike some Sufi groups that might view legal obligations as secondary to spiritual truths, Mujaddidis maintain that the Haqiqa (Truth) serves the Sharia (Law). Practices such as Sama (musical listening) and ecstatic dancing, common in the Chishti order, are generally rejected by Mujaddidis as incompatible with the Sunnah.

=== Sunnah, Shari'ah and Tariqah ===
The Mujaddidi order emphasizes that the Tariqa (the Sufi path) is entirely subordinate to the Shari'ah. Sirhindi famously stated that the "Shari'ah has three parts: knowledge, action and sincerity" and that the purpose of Sufism is merely to achieve the third part sincerity (ikhlas).

=== Rejection of Music and Vocal Dhikr ===
Unlike the Chishtiyya or Suhrawardiyya orders, the Mujaddidiyya strictly prohibit the use of music (Sama) and vocal chanting. They practice Dhikr-i Khafi (silent remembrance), believing it to be the practice of Muhammad and the first Caliph Abu Bakr.

=== Spiritual practices ===
==== Dhikr-e-Khafi (silent remembrance) ====
Adhering to the Naqshbandi tradition, the Mujaddidis practice Dhikr-i Khafi (silent remembrance of God). This is performed individually or in a group (Khatm-i Khwajagan), focusing on the heart without vocalizing the names of God. This silence is based on the Quranic verse —

وَاذۡكُرْ رَّبَّكَ فِىۡ نَفۡسِكَ تَضَرُّعًا وَّخِيۡفَةً وَّدُوۡنَ الۡجَـهۡرِ مِنَ الۡقَوۡلِ بِالۡغُدُوِّ وَالۡاٰصَالِ وَلَا تَكُنۡ مِّنَ الۡغٰفِلِيۡنَ ٢٠٥

— Surah Al-ʾAʿraf 7:205
Translation:

Remember your Lord inwardly with humility and reverence and in a moderate tone of voice, both morning and evening. And do not be one of the heedless.

— Sahih International English translation

==== Lataif-e-Sitta (the six subtleties) ====
The Mujaddidi path involves the purification of six subtle centers of consciousness (Lataif) located in the human body. The seeker focuses on these points in a specific sequence during meditation:

1. Qalb (Heart) – Yellow/Gold – Located on the left side of the chest.
2. Ruh (Spirit) – Red – Located on the right side of the chest.
3. Sirr (Secret) – White – Located above the Heart.
4. Khafi (Hidden) – Black – Located above the Spirit.
5. Akhfa (Most Hidden) – Green – Located in the center of the chest.
6. Nafs (Self) – Located at the forehead or navel.

==== Rabita (spiritual connection) ====
The practice of Rabita-i Sharif involves the student establishing a heart-to-heart spiritual connection with the Sheikh (master). The student visualizes the Sheikh to receive spiritual effulgence (faiz), which is believed to flow from Muhammad through the chain of masters.

==== Suhbah (companionship) ====
High importance is placed on the physical company of the spiritual master to facilitate spiritual transmission.

== Global influence ==
=== South Asia ===
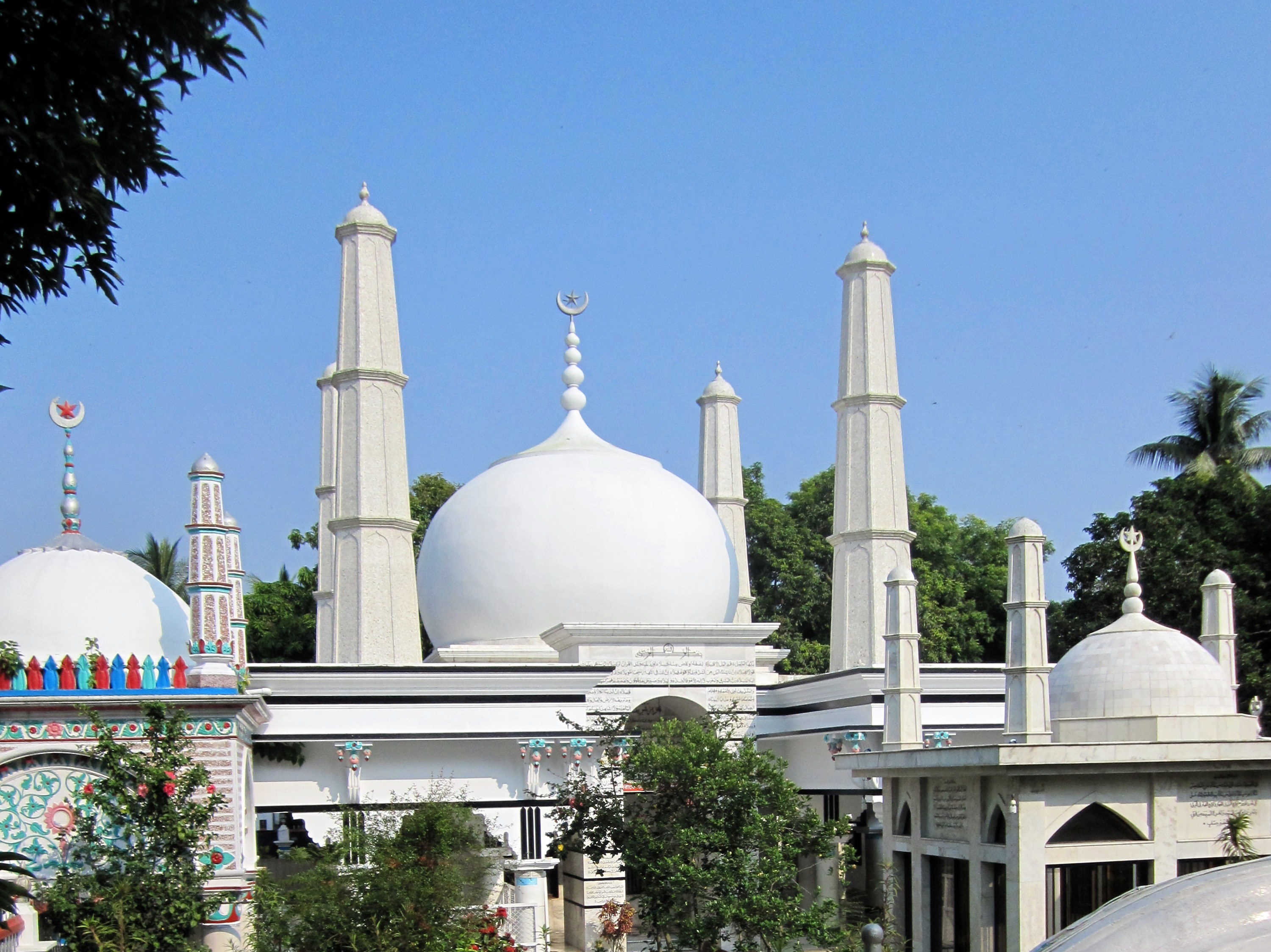
Shrine of Khawaja Yunus Ali Enayetpuri in Bangladesh.

The Mujaddidi order was a driving force behind Islamic revivalism in India. Key figures such as Shah Waliullah Dehlawi (1703–1762), though initiated into multiple orders, were heavily influenced by Mujaddidi reformism. The order is also often credited with influencing the more orthodox policies of Emperor Aurangzeb. The order also played a role in anti-colonial resistance movements with various localized uprisings led by Sufi leaders trained in the Mujaddidi tradition.

=== Southeast Asia ===
The Mujaddidi branch of the Naqshbandi order reached Southeast Asia primarily from the late 17th century onward through scholarly, commercial, and pilgrimage networks linking the region with India, the Hijaz, and the Ottoman world. Mujaddidi influence was transmitted largely by Southeast Asian scholars who studied in the Middle East or South Asia and later returned to regions such as Aceh, Java, and the Malay Peninsula with Naqshbandī-Mujaddidī affiliations. In the Indonesian and Malay worlds, Naqshbandī-Mujaddidī teachings interacted with existing Sufi traditions, including the Shattarīyya and Qadirīyya, and were often associated with reformist emphases on Sunni orthodoxy, disciplined spiritual practice, and adherence to Islamic law (Sharīʿah).

=== Central Asia and China ===
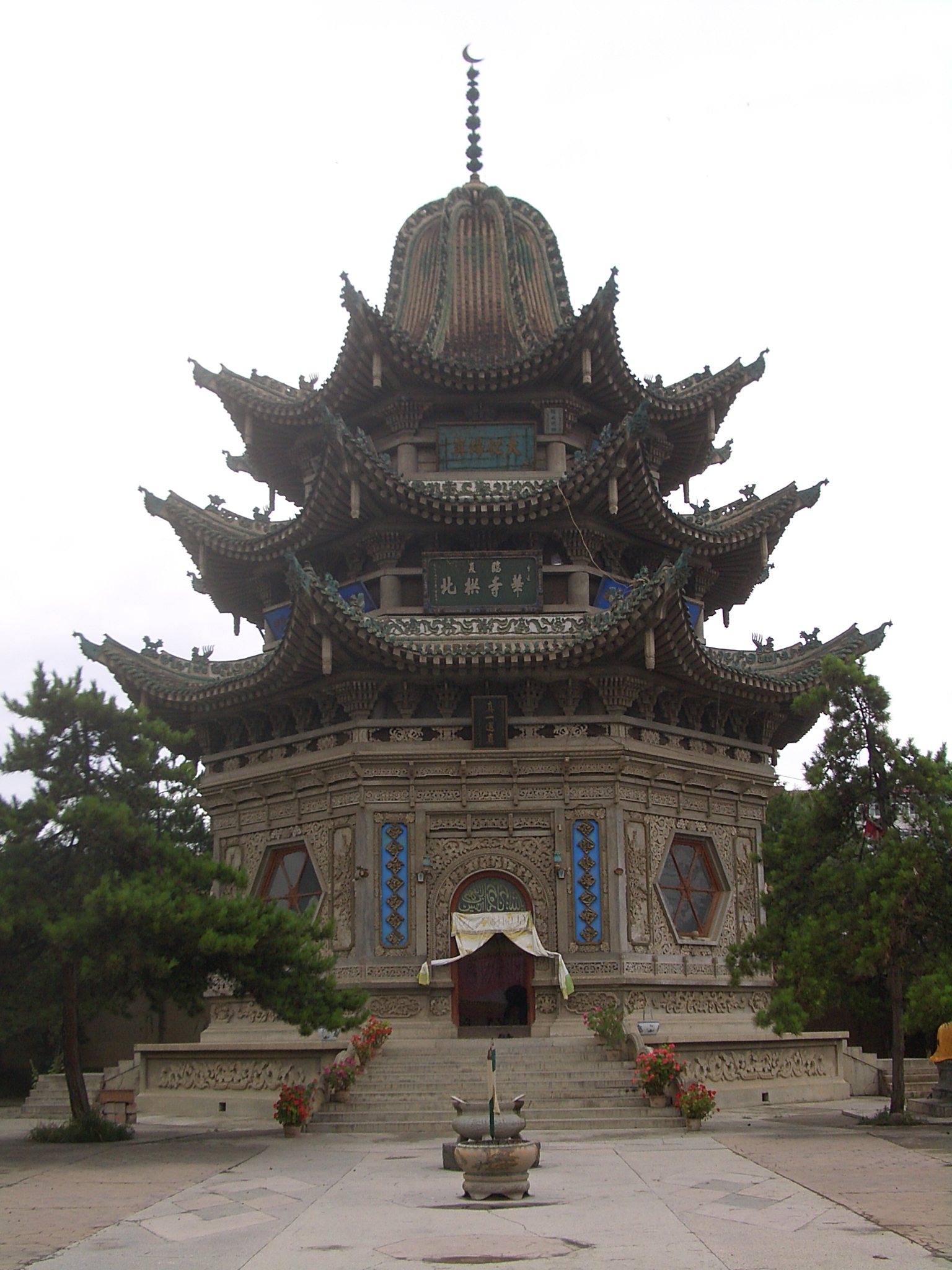
Ma Laichi's mausoleum (Hua Si Gongbei) in Linxia City, is the earliest and most important Naqshbandi monument in China.

The order made a "reverse migration" back to Central Asia, the original home of the Naqshbandiyya, through the efforts of Indian deputies. It also penetrated China, where it influenced the "New Teaching" (Xinjiao) movements among the Hui people, sometimes leading to friction with traditionalist Chinese Muslim communities (Gedimu). The Menhuan system of Chinese Sufism includes several lineages, such as the Jahriyya, that trace their roots to Mujaddidi teachers, specifically via the Central Asian missionaries like Ma Laichi.

=== Middle East and Ottoman Empire ===
A key figure in the establishment of the Mujaddidi lineage in Ottoman lands was Muḥammad Murād al-Bukhārī (d. 1720), a Central Asian Naqshbandī-Mujaddidī shaykh who settled in Istanbul and attracted followers among Ottoman scholars and officials. Through his activities and those of his disciples, the Mujaddidi interpretation of the Naqshbandi path gained influence in Anatolia, the Balkans, Syria and Iraq.

In the late 18th and early 19th centuries, the Mujaddidi legacy strongly influenced the emergence of the Khalidīyya branch of the Naqshbandi order, founded by Khālid al-Baghdādī (d. 1827). Although the Khalidiyya developed distinct institutional characteristics, it traced its spiritual genealogy to the Mujaddidi lineage and played a major role in expanding Naqshbandī influence across Ottoman territories during the final century of the empire.

=== Modern era ===
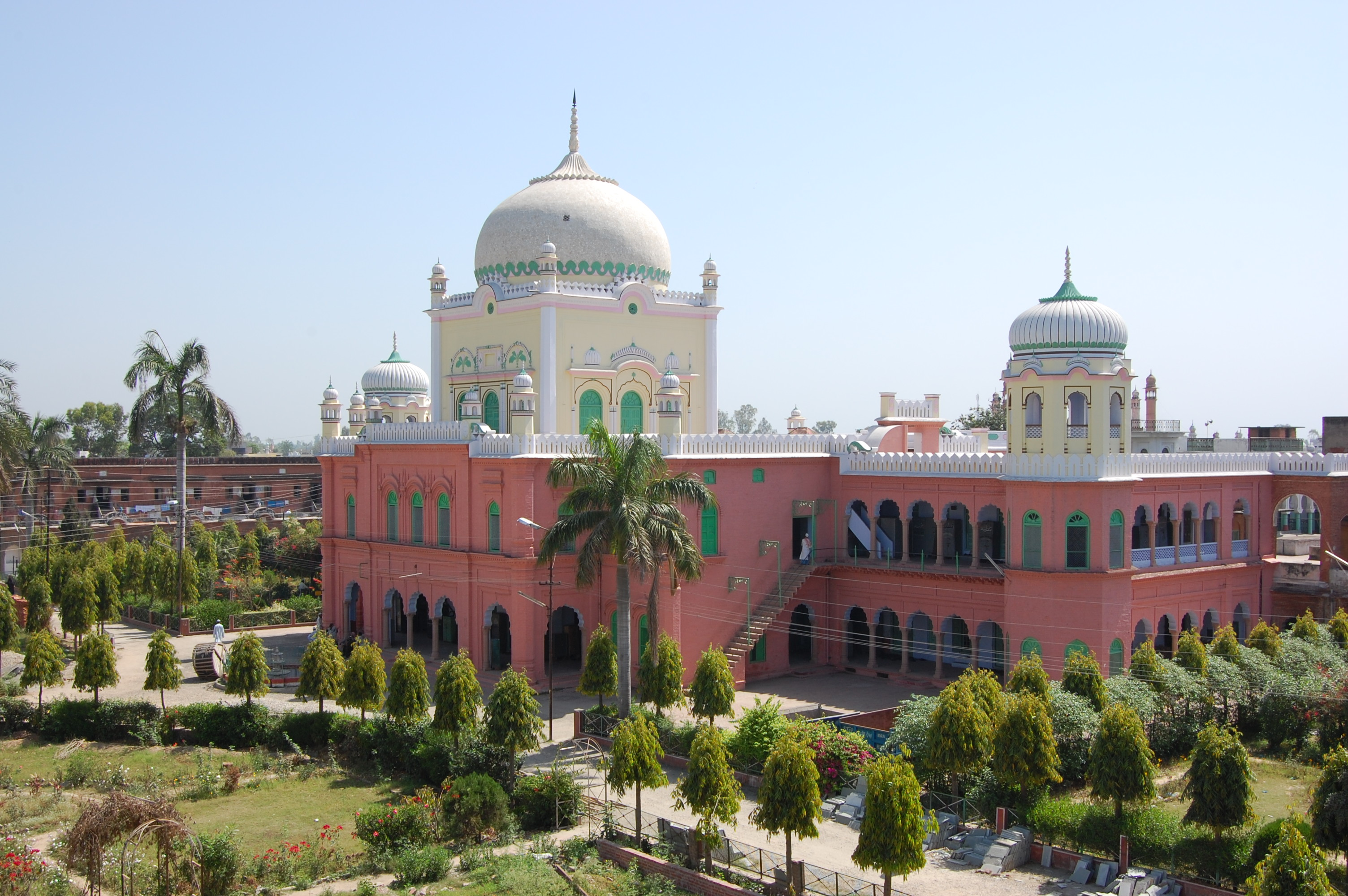
Darul Uloom Deoband in India.

The Mujaddidi order remains one of the most widespread Sufi lineages in the contemporary world. It has significantly influenced modern Islamic revivalist movements. For example, the Deobandi movement in South Asia, while primarily a legal and scholastic school, incorporates the Mujaddidi spiritual lineage in its curriculum for self-purification. Today, the Mujaddidi order and its sub-branches (such as the Khalidi, Haqqani, and Saifi) remain active globally. They maintain a strong presence in Pakistan, India, Turkey and Western countries, operating madrasas, publishing houses, and spiritual centers (khanqahs).

== Prominent figures ==
Several key figures have shaped the development and spread of the Mujaddidi order:

Name	Lifespan	Region/Activity	Contribution	Reference
Ahmad Sirhindi	d. 1624	North India	Founder of the order and the Naqshbandī-Mujaddidī branch.	
Khawāja Muḥammad Maʿṣūm	d. 1668	North India	Son of Ahmad Sirhindi; responsible for global expansion and consolidated Mujaddidi networks and managed khānqāhs.	
Syed Adam Banuri	d. 1643	North India	Spiritual adviser to Ahmad Sirhindi.	
Muḥammad Murād al-Bukhārī	d. 1720	Ottoman Empire (Istanbul)	Central Asian shaykh who transmitted Mujaddidi teachings to Ottoman lands.	
Shah Waliullah Dehlawi	d. 1762	North India	Islamic sunni scholar and sufi reformer.	
Ma Laichi	d. 1766	Northwest China	Chinese sufi saint who brought the Khufiyya tariqa to China and created the Huasi menhuan.	
Ma Mingxin	d. 1781	Northwest China	Chinese sufi saint, the founder of the Jahriyya menhuan.	
Mirzā Mazhar Jān-i Jānān	d. 1781	North India	Urdu poet and Sufi saint, established the Mazhari branch.	
Shah Ghulam Ali Dehlavi	d. 1824	North India	A pivotal figure in Delhi who trained international scholars.	
Khālid al-Baghdādī	d. 1827	Ottoman Empire	Founder of the Khalidiyya branch, integrating Mujaddidi principles and spreading them widely.	
Syed Ahmad Barelvi	d. 1831	North India	A 19th-century saint and military commander involved in the resistance against the British rule.	
Noor Muhammad Nizampuri	d. 1858	Bengal	A 19th-century saint and one of the three Ghazis of Syed Ahmad Barelvi.	
Fateh Ali Waisi	d. 1886	Bengal	Persian poet and sufi saint, author of the Diwan-i-Waisi.	
Khawaja Yunus Ali Enayetpuri	d. 1952	East Bengal	A 20th-century bengali saint and one of the most influential sufis in the Naqshbandī-Mujaddidī order.	
Syed Abul Fazal Sultan Ahmad Chandrapuri	d. 1984	Bangladesh	Bangladeshi sufi saint and the founder of Chandrapara Pak Darbar Sharif in Bangladesh.	

== Spiritual genealogy ==
Naqshbandi Sufis claim that Mujaddidi order is descended from a long line of "spiritual masters" which were claimed by the order:

1. Muhammad, d. 11 AH, buried in al-Masjid al-Nabawī, al-Madinah al-Munawwarah, Kingdom of Saudi Arabia (570/571–632 CE).
2. Abī Bakr al-Ṣiddīq, d. 13 AH, buried in al-Masjid al-Nabawī, al-Madinah al-Munawwarah, Kingdom of Saudi Arabia (573–634 CE).
3. Salman al-Farsi, d. 35 AH, buried in Al-Mada'in, Iraq (568–653 CE).
4. Al-Qāsim ibn Muḥammad ibn Abī Bakr, d. 107 AH, buried in Medina, Saudi Arabia (668–738 CE).
5. Ja'far ibn Muhammad al-Sadiq, d. 148 AH, buried in Medina, Saudi Arabia (702–765 CE).
6. Bāyazīd Basṭāmī, d. 261 AH, buried in Bastaam, Iran (804 – 874 CE).
7. Abu 'l-Hassan Ali ibn Ahmad ibn Salmān al-Kharaqāni, d. 425 AH, buried Kharqaan, Iran (963–1033 CE).
8. Abu ali Farmadi, d. 477 AH, buried in Tous, Khorasan, Iran (1016–1084 CE).
9. Abū Yaʿqūb Yūsuf al-Hammandinā, d. 535 AH, buried in Maru, Khorasan, Iran (1048–1140 CE).
10. Abdul Khaliq Ghijduwani, d. 575 AH, buried in Ghajdawan, Bukhara, Uzbekistan.
11. Khawaja Muhammad Arif Riwgari, d. 616 AH, buried in Reogar, Bukhara, Uzbekistan.
12. Khwaja Mahmood al-Anjir al-Faghnawi, d. 715 AH, buried in Waabakni, Mawarannahr, Uzbekistan (1231–1317 CE).
13. Azizan Ali Ramitani, d. 715 AH, buried in Khwarezm, Bukhara, Uzbekistan (1194–1315 CE).
14. Mohammad as-Samasi, d. 755 AH, buried in Samaas, Bukhara, Uzbekistan (1195–1257 CE).
15. Sayyid Shams ud-Dīn Amir Kulāl, d. 772 AH, buried in Saukhaar, Bukhara, Uzbekistan (1278–1370 CE).
16. Imam Baha' al-Din Naqshband Bukhari, d. 791 AH, buried in Qasr-e-Aarifan, Bukhara, Uzbekistan (1318–1389 CE).
17. Sayyid Alauddin Attar Bukhari, buried in Jafaaniyan, Mawranahar, Uzbekistan (1338–1402 CE).
18. Yaʿqūb ibn ʿUthmān ibn Maḥmūd al-Charkhī, d. 851 AH, buried in Dushanbe, Tajikistan (1360–1447 CE).
19. Nāṣir ad-Dīn ʿUbaydullāh ibn Maḥmūd ibn Shihāb ad-Dīn Khawaja Ahrar, d. 895 AH, buried in Samarkand, Uzbekistan (1404–1490 CE).
20. Muhammad Zahid Wakhshi, d. 936 AH, buried in Wakhsh, Malk Hasaar, Tajikistan (1448–1530 CE).
21. Khawaja Darwish Muhammad, d. 970 AH, buried in Samarkand, Uzbekistan (1443–1562 CE).
22. Khwaja Muhammad Amkanagi, d. 1008 AH, buried in Akang, Bukhara, Uzbekistan.
23. Khwaja Muhammad Baqi Billah, d. 1012 AH, buried in Delhi, India (1564–1603 CE).
24. Imām Rabbānī Aḥmad ibn 'Abd al-Ahad al-Fārūqī al-Sirhindī Mūjaddīd al-Alf al-Thanī, d. 1034 AH, buried in Sirhindi, Punjab, India (1564–1624 CE).

== See also ==
- Naqshbandi
- Sufism in India
- Ahmad Sirhindi
