= Khalidiyya =

Naqshbandiyya Sufi lineage

Naqshbandiyya-Khalidiyya (or Mujaddidiyya-Khalidiyya) or simply known Khalidiyya is a branch of the Naqshbandiyya-Mujaddidiyya Sufi lineage. The branch stems from Mevlânâ Muhammad Khâlid-i Baghdâdî.

== The Khalidiyya silsila ==
#	Name	Buried	Birth	Death
1	Sayyiduna Muhammad	Madinah, Saudi Arabia	Mon 12 Rabi al-Awwal (570/571 CE)	12 Rabi al-Awwal 11 AH (5/6 June 632 CE)
2	Sayyiduna Abu Bakr Siddiq	Madinah, Saudi Arabia	c. 573	22 Jumada al-Thani 13 AH (22 August 634 C.E)
3	Sayyiduna Salman al-Farsi	Mada'in, Iraq	c. 568 CE	10 Rajab 33 AH (4/5 February 654 C.E)
4	Imām Qasim ibn Muhammad ibn Abi Bakr	Madinah, Saudi Arabia	23 Shaban 24 AH (22/23 June 645 C.E)	24 Jumada al-Thani 101/106/107 AH
5	Imām Jafar Sadiq	Madinah, Saudi Arabia	8 Ramadan 80 AH (5/6 November 699 C.E)	15 Rajab 148 AH (6/7 September 765 C.E)
6	Khwaja Bayazid Bastami	Bistam, Semnan province, Iran	186 AH (804 C.E)	15 Shaban 261 AH (24/25 May 875 C.E)
7	Khwaja Abul-Hassan Kharaqani	Kharaqan, near Bistam, Semnan province, Iran	352 AH (963 C.E)	10 Muharram 425 AH
8	Khwaja Abu al-Qasim Gurgani	Gorgan, Golestan, Iran	380 AH (990 C.E)	450 AH (1058 C.E)
9	Khwaja Abu ali Farmadi	Toos, Khurasan, Iran	434 AH (1042/1043 C.E)	4 Rabi al-Awwal 477 or 511 AH (10 July 1084 / 6 July 1117)
10	Khwaja Abu Yaqub Yusuf Hamadānī	Marv, near Mary, Turkmenistan	440 AH (1048/1049 C.E)	Rajab 535 AH (Feb/Mar 1141 C.E)
11	Khwaja Abdul Khaliq Ghujdawani	Ghajdawan, Bukhara, Uzbekistan	22 Shaban 435 AH (24/25 March 1044 C.E)	12 Rabi al-Awwal 575 AH (17/18 August 1179 C.E)
12	Khwaja Arif Riwgari	Reogar, near Bukhara, Uzbekistan	27 Rajab 551 AH (15 September 1156 C.E)	1 Shawwal 616 AH (10/11 December 1219 C.E.)
13	Khwaja Mahmood Anjir-Faghnawi	Bukhara, Uzbekistan	18 Shawwal 628 AH (18/19 August 1231 C.E)	17 Rabi al-Awwal 717 AH (29/30 May 1317 C.E)
14	Khwaja Ali Ramitani	Khwaarizm, Uzbekistan	591 AH (1194 C.E)	27 Ramadan 715 or 721 AH (25/26 December 1315 or 20/21 October 1321)
15	Khwaja Mohammad Baba As-Samasi	Samaas, Bukhara, Uzbekistan	25 Rajab 591 AH (5/6 July 1195 C.E)	10 Jumada al-Thani 755 AH (2/3 July 1354 C.E)
16	Khwaja Sayyid Amir Kulal	Saukhaar, Bukhara, Uzbekistan	676 AH (1277/1278 C.E)	Wed 2 Jumada al-Thani 772 AH (21/22 December 1370 C.E)
17	Khwaja Muhammad Baha'uddin Naqshband Bukhari	Qasr-e-Aarifan, Bukhara, Uzbekistan	4 Muharram 718 AH (8/9 March 1318 C.E)	3 Rabi al-Awwal 791 AH (2/3 March 1389 C.E)
18	Khwaja Ala'uddin Attar Bukhari	Jafaaniyan, Transoxiana (Uzbekistan)	1338–1339	Wed 20 Rajab 804 AH (23 February 1402 C.E)
19	Khwaja Yaqub Charkhi	Gulistan, Dushanbe, Tajikistan	762 AH (1360/1361 C.E)	5 Safar 851 AH (21/22 April 1447 C.E)
20	Khwaja Ubaidullah Ahrar	Samarkand, Uzbekistan	Ramadan 806 AH (March/April 1404 C.E)	29 Rabi al-Awwal 895 AH (19/20 February 1490 C.E)
21	Khwaja Muhammad Zahid Wakhshi	Wakhsh	14 Shawwal 852 AH (11/12 December 1448 C.E)	1 Rabi al-Awwal 936 AH (3/4 November 1529 C.E)
22	Khwaja Darwish Muhammad	Asqarar, Uzbekistan	16 Shawwal 846 AH (17/18 February 1443 C.E)	19 Muharram 970 AH (18/19 September 1562 C.E)
23	Khwaja Muhammad Amkanagi	Amkana, Bukhara, Uzbekistan	918 AH (1512/1513 C.E)	22 Shaban 1008 AH (8/9 March 1600 C.E)
24	Khwaja Muhammad Baqi Billah Berang	Delhi, India	5 Dhu al-Hijjah 971 or 972 AH (14 July 1564 / 3 July 1565)	25 Jumada al-Thani 1012 AH (29/30 November 1603 C.E)
25	Shaikh Ahmad al-Farūqī al-Sirhindī, Imām Rabbānī	Sirhind, India	14 Shawwal 971 AH (25/26 May 1564 C.E)	28 Safar 1034 AH (9/10 December 1624 C.E)
26	Imām Khwaja Muhammad Masum Faruqi	Sirhind, India	1007 AH (1598/1599 C.E)	9 Rabi al-Awwal 1099 AH (13/14 January 1688 C.E)
27	Khwaja Muhammad Saifuddin Faruqi	Sirhind, India	1049 AH (1639/1640 C.E)	19 or 26 Jumada al-awwal 1096 AH (April 1685 C.E)
28	Sayyid Nur Muhammad Badayuni	Delhi, India		11 Dhu al-Qi'dah 1135AH (12/13 August 1723 C.E)
29	Shaheed Mirza Mazhar Jan-e-Janaan, Shams-ud-Dīn Habībullāh	Delhi, India	11 Ramadan 1111 AH (2/3 March 1700 C.E)	10 Muharram 1195 AH (Fri 5 January 1781 C.E)
30	Khwaja Abdullah Dehlavi, alias Shah Ghulam Ali Dehlavi	Delhi, India	1156 AH (1743 C.E)	22 Safar 1240 AH (15/16 October 1824 C.E)
31	Mevlânâ Muhammad Khâlid-i Baghdâdî	Damascus, Syria	Sharazur, Sulaymaniyah, Iraq (1779 C.E)	(1827 C.E)
