= Ameer Abul Ula =

Indian Sufi saint Naqshbandi order (1583–1651)

Syedna Ameer Abulola Naqshbandi Ahrari
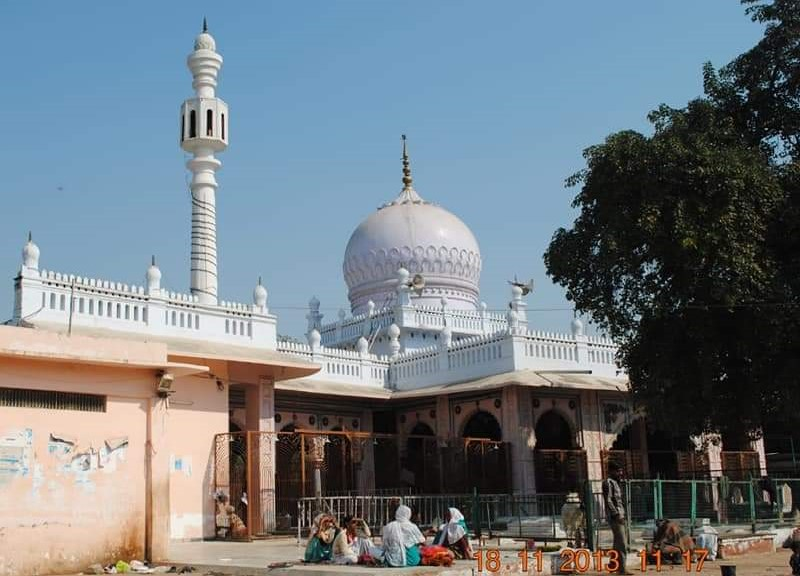
- Dargah of Ameer Abulola in Agra, Uttar Pradesh

Administrator of Burdwan, Bengal
- Preceded by: Khwaja Faizi
- Official name: Syedna Ameer Abul Ula Naqshbandi Ahrari

Personal life
- Born: 1583 (990 AH) Narela
- Died: 1651 (1061 AH) Uttar Pradesh
- Resting place: Agra, Uttar Pradesh
- Home town: Agra
- Main interest: Sufism

Religious life
- Religion: Islam
- Jurisprudence: Hanafi
- Tariqa: Naqshbandi, Chishti
- Creed: Maturidi

Muslim leader
- Influenced by: Baha' al-Din Naqshband, Mu'in al-Din Chishti, Khwaja Ubaydullah Ahrar, Sharfuddin Yahya Maneri
- Influenced: Syed Dost Muhammad, Shah Muhammad Farhad Dehlavi, Munam Pak, Ata Hussain Fani Chishti

Sayyid Ameer Abul Ula (1583 – 1651 CE) was an Indian Sufi shaykh of the Naqshbandi order and the eponymous founder of the Naqshbandi Abul Ulai lineage, one of the largest Naqshbandi branches in the Indian subcontinent. He is regarded as a descendant of the Ahl al-Bayt and is widely known in Sufi literature for his spiritual connection with the Chishtiyya through the saint Khwaja Moinuddin Chishti. His synthesis of Naqshbandi and Chishti influences led to his silsila being described as Majmaʿ al-Baḥrayn (“the Meeting of the Two Seas”).

== Early life & Background ==
=== Birth ===
Ameer Abul Ula was born in 990 AH / 1592 CE in Narela, near Delhi into a family tracing its descent to the Prophet Muhammad through the Ahl al-Bayt. His given name was Amīr Abū al-ʿUlā, and his pen-name was Insān. He came to be known by various honorifics such as “Mīr Ṣāḥib”, “Sayyidnā Sarkār”, “Maḥbūb-e-Jall-o-Ilā”, and “Sartāj-e-Āgra”. His father was Amīr Abū al-Wafā and his mother was Bībī ʿĀrifa.

=== His Lineage ===
On his father's side, Sayyid Ameer Abul Ula traced his descent to Imām Zayn al-ʿĀbidīn and through him to Husayn ibn Ali and Ali ibn Abi Talib. On his mother's side, he traced his lineage to Abu Bakr, through Khwāja Muḥammad al-Nāmī al-Baghdādī and ultimately to Ubaydullah Ahrar of the Naqshbandī order.

According to traditional accounts, he resigned from this position following a visionary dream in which Ali, Hasan and Husayn instructed him to adopt the spiritual life (dariweshī).

=== Family Background ===
His ancestors originally lived in Kirman, Iran. The shrine of Sayyid Amīr ʿImād al-Dīn (ancestor of Ameer Abul Ula) still exists in the region.

During the Timurid period, Amīr Taqī al-Dīn Kirmānī (his great-great-great-grandfather), a close companion of Khwāja ʿUbaydullāh Aḥrār, migrated from Kirman to Samarkand. He studied under Qutb al-Dīn Rāzī and mastered both exoteric and esoteric sciences. He and Aḥrār are buried in Samarkand, and traditional accounts state that Aḥrār personally carried his bier.

In the early 10th century AH, instability in Central Asia under Shāh Beg Khān led many descendants to migrate toward Kashghar and then to Hindustan.

=== Arrival in India ===
Sayyid Ameer Abul Ula's grandfather, Amīr ʿAbd al-Salām, settled in India during the reign of Akbar (1556–1605). He moved from Samarkand to Lahore and finally settled in Narela, where Ameer Abul Ula was born.

The family later lived in Fatehpur Sikri, where his father passed away and was buried near Madrasa Lāl Darwāza in Delhi, though the precise grave location was later lost. His grandfather died during Ḥajj and was buried in al-Baqīʿ, Medina.

=== Upbringing and Education ===
After his grandfather's death, Ameer Abul Ula was taken to Bardhaman by his maternal grandfather Khwāja Faiz al-Maʿrūf Faizī, a Mughal administrator under Mān Singh. There he received extensive education in the transmitted and rational sciences.

He excelled in religious sciences and also in martial arts, including archery and horsemanship.

== Youth, Administrative Career, and Turn Toward Sufism ==
In his youth, he briefly served as a governor under the Mughal Emperor Akbar. When Ameer Abul Ula's heart became fully inclined toward a life of worship and detachment, he resolved to leave Bardhaman and abandon worldly service. Around this time, in 1014 AH / 1605 CE, Emperor Akbar passed away and Nūr al-Dīn Jahāngīr ascended the Mughal throne. Jahangir issued a decree requiring all governors, nobles, and officials of Agra to present themselves in the royal court so their abilities could be assessed. As Abul Ula held no interest in administrative or worldly appointments, he regarded this order as a divine indication to withdraw from worldly affairs.

He departed Bardwan and travelled first to Azimabad (Patna) and then to Maner Sharif, where he learned of the presence of Hazrat Abu Yazīd Makhdūm Shah Daulat Manerī (d. 1017 AH/1608 AD), a descendant of the early conqueror of Maner and closely related to the eminent Firdawsi master Makhdūm-e-Jahān Sharafuddin Ahmad Yahyā Manerī (d. 782 AH/1380 AD). The sources note that the Sajjāda-nashīn (custodian) family of Khanqah Sajjadia Abulolaiya, Danapur descends from these notable saints.

== Sufi Training and Initiation ==
According to Syed Shah Muradullah Maneri, Ameer Abul Ula first visited the renowned Firdawsi master Makhdūm Sharafuddin Yahya Maneri (d. 782 AH) after hearing of his spiritual rank, and received his earliest spiritual instruction from him.This early training, according to the source, contributed to the later prominence of the Abul-Ulā’iyyah branch.

=== Affiliation with the Naqshbandi order ===
Ameer Abul Ula later entered the Naqshbandi Sufi Order through his maternal uncle Ameer Abdullah Naqshbandi (d. 1033 AH/1623AD), to whom he formally gave bayʿah. He received complete authorization (khilāfah) from him along with the inherited family relics (tabarrukāt). At the time of his death, Ameer Abdullah appointed Ameer Abul Ula as his successor and spiritual inheritor, handing over to him “the trust of Qutbiyyah.”

Through his teachings and disciples, the Naqshbandi Abul Ulai lineage later became a major sub-branch of the Naqshbandiyya in India, parallel to the more widely known Mujaddidi branch associated with Shaykh Ahmad Sirhindi.

=== Visit to Ajmer and connection with the Chishti order ===
Accounts preserved by Mawlana Abdul Hai Shah Jahangiri describe a transformative event in Ameer Abul Ula's life. Troubled by spiritual anxiety, he traveled to the dargah of Moinuddin Chishti at Ajmer.

He reportedly implored Khwaja Moinuddin Chishti for spiritual blessing, noting that the Prophet had honoured the Chishti master with extraordinary gifts. After initially leaving the shrine without perceiving an answer, he experienced an inner call to return. Upon his return, he is said to have witnessed a visionary ziyārat (visitation) in which Khwaja Moinuddin Chishti conveyed to him a spiritual trust (amānat) symbolized as a shining egg-like light.

=== Chishti Affiliation and Uwaisī Transmission ===
His connection to the Chishtī Order is described in multiple sources. His spiritual initiation in the Chishti path occurred through an Uwaisī transmission (faiz-i-Uwaisī) attributed to Khwāja Muʿīn al-Dīn Chishti Ajmeri (d. 633 AH), whom he is said to have spiritually encountered. When seekers requested Chishti bayʿah from him, he would record his own name immediately after that of Khwāja Muʿīn al-Dīn, indicating a direct esoteric transmission. Shah Hayātullāh Munʿamī noted that old genealogical scrolls (shajara) of the Chishtiyyah Abul-Ulā’iyyah sequence in Ajmer show the same structure.

=== Famous Incident in the Court of Emperor Jahangir ===
When Ameer Abul Ula later arrived in Agra (then Akbarābād), reports of his personal grace and presence reached the court of Emperor Jahangir. Anfās al-ʿĀrifīn and Nijāt-e-Qāsim recount a notable incident: Jahangir invited him to the court's archery trial. After Ameer Abul Ula successfully struck the target on the second attempt, the emperor, pleased, offered him wine. Ameer Abul Ula discreetly poured it into his sleeve rather than drinking it. Jahangir noticed and rebuked him; Ameer Abul Ula replied that he feared “the wrath of God and His Messenger, not the wrath of a king.” The narrative describes that this bold response created a fearful stir in the court.

=== Integration of the Two Orders ===
After what is recorded as a powerful spiritual encounter at the shrine of Khwāja Muʿīn al-Dīn Chishti in Ajmer, Ameer Abul Ula was initiated into the Chishtiyyah as well. From that point, his lineage was called Majmaʿ al-Baḥrayn (“The Confluence of Two Seas”), referring to the union of Naqshbandi and Chishti spiritual transmissions.

Through these combined authorizations, Ameer Abul Ula transmitted a distinct spiritual current that later became known as the Naqshbandi Abul-Ula’iyyah path, widely spread in the Indian subcontinent through his successors.

== Teachings ==
Ameer Abul Ula dedicated his life to the spiritual training of disciples, service to society, and propagation of Islamic teachings. His lineage spread widely through his authorised deputies (khulafā’), particularly through Khawaja Shah Muhammad Farhad, who served as one of his principal khalifas.

Makhdum Shah Muneem Pakbaz, studied Naqshbandi Abul Ulai practices under Shah Muhammad Farhad for a decade.

== Death and legacy ==
Sayyid Ameer Abul Ula passed away on 9 Safar 1061 AH (31 January 1651). His shrine is located in Agra, India, where it remains a place of visitation for followers of the Naqshbandi and Chishti traditions. His Urs is celebrated at his dargah and in many Khanqah

Another prominent saint was Khwaja Hasan Sarkar of his Abul Olai Sufi Spiritual lineage. His shrine is located in Bhainsori Sharif.

== Naqshbandi-Abul Ulai ==
Naqshbandi Silsila of Ameer Abul-Ula

Prophet Muhammad
Imam Ali ibn Abi Talib
Imam Hussain
Imam Zain-ul Abideen
Imam Muhammad al-Baqir
Imam Jafar al-Sadiq
Bayazid Bastami
Abu al-Hassan al-Kharaqani
Abul Qasim Gurgani
Abu Ali Farmadi
Yusuf al-Hamadani
Abdul Khaliq Ghijduwani
Khwaja Arif Riwgari
Khwaja Mahmood Abul Khair Faghnavi
Khwaja Azeezan Ali Ramitni
Khwaja Muhammad Baba Samasi
Hazrat Syed Ameer Nooruddin Kulal
Khwaja Bahauddin Naqshband
Khwaja Yaqub al- Charkhi
Khwaja Ubaydullah Ahrar
Khwaja Abdul Haq al-Mubashshir Muhiuddin
Khwaja Muhammad Yahya
Khwaja Sayyid Abdullah Akbarabadi
Sayyid Ameer Abul Ula

== See also ==
- Naqshbandi
- Ahmad Sirhindi
- Chishti Order
- Moinuddin Chishti
- Sufi orders
