= Ahmad Sirhindi =

Indian Naqshbandi Sufi (1564–1624)

Imam Rabbani Ahmad ibn 'Abd al-Ahad al-Fārūqī al-Sirhindī
- أحمد بن عبد الأحد
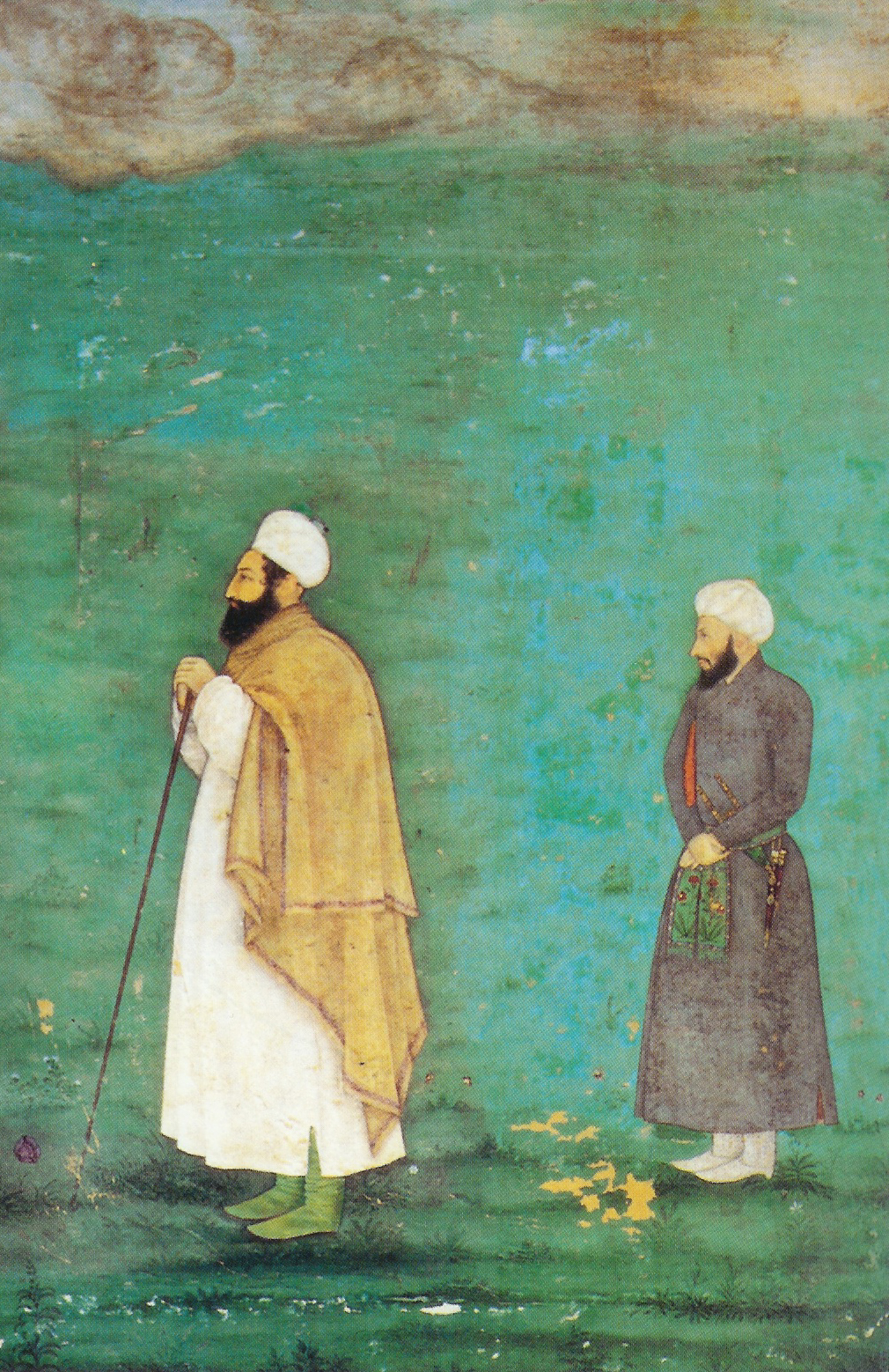
- Painting of Shaykh Ahmad al-Sirhindi c. 16th-17th Century
- Title: Mūjaddīd al-Alf al-Thanī (Reviver of the Second Millennium).

Personal life
- Born: 26 May 1564/1563 Sirhind, Punjab, Mughal Empire (modern-day Punjab, India)
- Died: 10 December 1624 (aged 60) Sirhind, Lahore Subah, Mughal Empire
- Era: Mughal India
- Main interest(s): Islamic Law, Islamic philosophy
- Notable idea: Evolution of Islamic philosophy Application of Islamic law

Religious life
- Religion: Islam
- Denomination: Sunni
- Jurisprudence: Hanafi
- Tariqa: Naqshbandi-Mujaddidi
- Creed: Maturidi

Muslim leader
- Teacher: Shaykh Yaqub Sarfi Kashmiri
- Predecessor: Khwaja Baqi Billah
- Successor: Khawaja Muhammad Masum
- Influenced: Jahangir Aurangzeb Shah Waliullah Shah Abdul Aziz Imam Ahmad Raza Khan
- Arabic name
- Personal (Ism): Ahmad أحمد
- Patronymic (Nasab): Abd al-Ahad عبد الأحد
- Epithet (Laqab): Imām Rabbānī الإمام رباني
- Toponymic (Nisba): al-Fārūqī al-Sirhindī الفاروقي السرهندي

Imām Rabbānī Shāykh Aḥmad ibn 'Abd al-Ahad al-Fārūqī al-Sirhindī Mūjaddīd al-Alf al-Thanī or simply known as Ahmad Sirhindi (Note: Full name Aḥmad ibn 'Abd al-Ahad al-Fārūqī al-Sirhindī; he is also known by the titles Imām Rabbānī or Mūjaddīd al-Alf al-Thanī (Reviver of the Second Millennium).) (1564 – 1624/1625) was an Indian Islamic scholar, Hanafi jurist, and member of the Naqshbandī Sufi order who lived during the era of Mughal Empire.

Ahmad Sirhindi opposed heterodox movements within the Mughal court such as Din-i Ilahi, in support of more orthodox forms of Islamic Law. His act of preserving and urging the practice of Islamic orthodoxy and challenging Akbar and later Jahangir by rejecting Din-i Ilahi has cemented his reputation among South Asian Muslims as a Mujaddid, or a "reviver".

While early and modern South Asian scholarship credited him for contributing to conservative trends in Indian Islam, more recent works, such as Abul Hasan Ali Hasani Nadwi and commentaries from western scholars such as Ter Haar, Friedman, and Buehler, have pointed to Sirhindi's significant contributions to Sufi epistemology and practices.

== Biography ==
Sirhindi was born on 26 May 1564 in the village of Sirhind, Punjab to a Punjabi Muslim family. A descendant of 13th-century Sufi saint and poet Baba Farid, he claimed ancestry from the second Rashidun caliph, Umar (634–644). Sirhindi received most of his early education from his father, 'Abd al-Ahad, his brother, Muhammad Sadiq and from a Lahore-based scholar Muhammad Tahir al-Lahuri. He also memorised the Qur'an. He then studied in Sialkot, which had become an intellectual centre under the scholar Kamaluddin Kashmiri. Qazi Bahlol Badakhshani taught him jurisprudence, Seerah and history. He eventually joined the Naqshbandī order through the Sufi missionary Khwaja Baqi Billah when he was 36 years old, and became a leading master of the order. His deputies traversed the Mughal Empire in order to popularize the order and eventually won favour with the Mughal court. Sirhindi underwent his first Hajj pilgrimage in 1598, after the death of his father.

During the reign of emperor Akbar, Ahmad Sirhindi wrote hundreds of letters which were aimed towards his disciples, Mughal nobles, and even the emperor himself, to denounce the participations of Hindu figures in the government. Annemarie Schimmel recorded about 534 letters has been wrote by Ahmad Sirhindi regarding the subject of Syncretism. His efforts influenced Abul Fazl, the protegee of emperor Akbar, to support Ahmad Sirhindi in an effort to convince Jahangir, the successor of Akbar, to reverse the policies of Akbar of tolerating Hindus in Mughal court. According to the modern Syrian Salafi jurist Ali al-Tantawi, Ahmad Sirhindi never aspired to depose the emperor despite his fierce criticism; instead, he wanted to reform the religious policies of the late emperor so he sent letters inflamed with religious fervor and faith towards young commanders and courtiers and to gather them into his cause to reverse the emperor's religious policy to persuade the emperor.

Ahmad Sirhindi's letters contain heavy tone of support towards this spirit of religious reform by restoring Sharia and departure from Akbar's policy under the rule of Jahangir, as shown of the letter has stated: 'Today there is a revolution/transformation in the state (':wa lamma vaqa'a al-anabal-inqilabu fi al-duwali')'.

According to jesuit missionary Pierre de Jarric, Ahmad Sirhindi also sent letters to his disciple, Shaikh Farid Bukhari, a Mir Bakshi official who had been appointed as representative of the muslim orthodox faction of Mughal court, to support the future emperor Jahangir. The orthodox faction extracted promise from Jahangir that he would support the cause of orthodox faction's cause if he succeeded his father. It is also known through his letter correspondence with the imperial government figures that Ahmad Sirhindi routinely attended the court debates to counteract some religious beliefs and doctrines which were prevalent in the court. In the process, it is recorded from these correspondence which compiled in 1617, that Farid Murtaza Khan took Ahmad Sirhindi advices regarding this matter. Ahmad Sirhindi also wrote a letter to Mughal Emperor Jahangir emphasizing that he is now correcting the wrong path taken by his father, emperor Akbar.

At some point during the reign of Jahangir, Ahmad Sirhimdi sent many pupils for academic missionaries into various places, such as:

- 70 individuals which led by his pupil named Muhammad Qasim to Turkestan.
- 40 individuals under another pupil named Faruh Hussain into Arabian Peninsula, Yemen, Syria, and Anatolia.
- 10 individuals under another pupil named Muhammad Sadiq into Kashgar.
- 30 individuals under another pupil named Shaykh Ahmad Bakri into the outskirt of Turkestan, Badakhshan, and Khurasan.

Later, Ahmad Sirhindi was imprisoned by the emperor. This happened in 1618, Emperor Jahangir, who distanced himself from the Islam orthodoxy and admired Vaishnavite ascetic, Chitrarup. But later the emperor rectified his order and freed Ahmad Sirhindi. However, Ahmad Sirhindi was imprisoned once again in 1622, suggested to be due to the jealousy of several nobles for his popularity, before being released again after spending one year in Gwalior prison and another three years in a prison within emperor Jahangir army entourage.

After his release and restoration of favor and honor, Ahmad Sirhindi accompanied emperor Jahangir in his entourage into Deccan Plateau. Modern Indian historian Irfan Habib considers the efforts of Ahmad Sirhindi to bear success as emperor Jahangir started changing the policies which were criticized by Ahmad Sirhindi. Ahmad Sirhindi likely stayed to accompany the emperor for three years before his death. He continued to exercise influence over the Mughal court along with his son, Shaikh Masum, who tutored the young prince Aurangzeb. Ahmad Sirhindi died in the morning of 10 December 1624.

Another son of Ahmad Sirhindi, Khawaja Muhammad Masum, supported Aurangzeb during the Mughal succession conflict, by sending his two sons, Muhammad Al-Ashraf, and Khwaja Saifuddin, to support Aurangzeb in war. Aurangzeb himself provided Khwaja Muhammad and his youngest son, Muhammad Ubaidullah, with fifteen ships to seek refugee during the conflict to embark for Hajj pilgrimage, and Khwaja Muhammad returned to India after Aurangzeb won the conflict two years later.

== Personal views ==
Modern writer Zahid Yahya al-Zariqi has likened Ahmad Sirhindi's personal views to Muhammad ibn Ali al-Sanusi, Ibn Taymiyya, Muhammad ibn Abd al-Wahhab, Ibn Qayyim al-Jawziyya, Abd al-Razzaq al-San'ani, and Al-Shawkani, due to his orthodox stance, and his opposition to emperor Akbar in terms of religious practice. Similarly, Aḥmad ʻArafāt Qāḍi from Cairo University also likened the thoughts of Ahmad Sirhindi to the views of Ibn Taymiyya. Salah Shu'air, an Egyptian writer, suggested Sirhindi's views were similar to the Wahhabism movement that arose two centuries after Ahmad Sirhindi's death, with both arguing for the resurrection and revival of religious discourse, which also influenced Shah Waliullah Dehlawi.

Ahmad Sirhindi repeatedly emphasised his proud ancestry to Rashidun caliph Umar ibn al-Khattab to show he was similarly in favour of orthodoxy. Abul Hasan Ali Hasani Nadwi, an Islamic scholar, thinker, writer, preacher, reformer and a Muslim public intellectual of 20th century India, wrote a biography of Ahmad Sirhindi in his book, Rijal al-Fikr wa l-Da'wah fi al-Islam, which mostly covers Ahmad Sirhindi's efforts to revive Islam and his opposition to Bid'ah (heresy). On another occasion, in a letter to Lãlã Beg (a Subahdar of Bihar), he described Akbar's prohibition of cow-slaughter as interference against the religious freedom of Muslims.

In particular, Ahmad Sirhindi believed that every ritualistic practice which is not documented in Sunnah, such as the annual prophet anniversary, was forbidden in Islam. He also criticized practices such as Sufi whirling (Raqs), the tradition of Sujud or prostrating towards the ruler, and other rituals which he deemed unislamic.

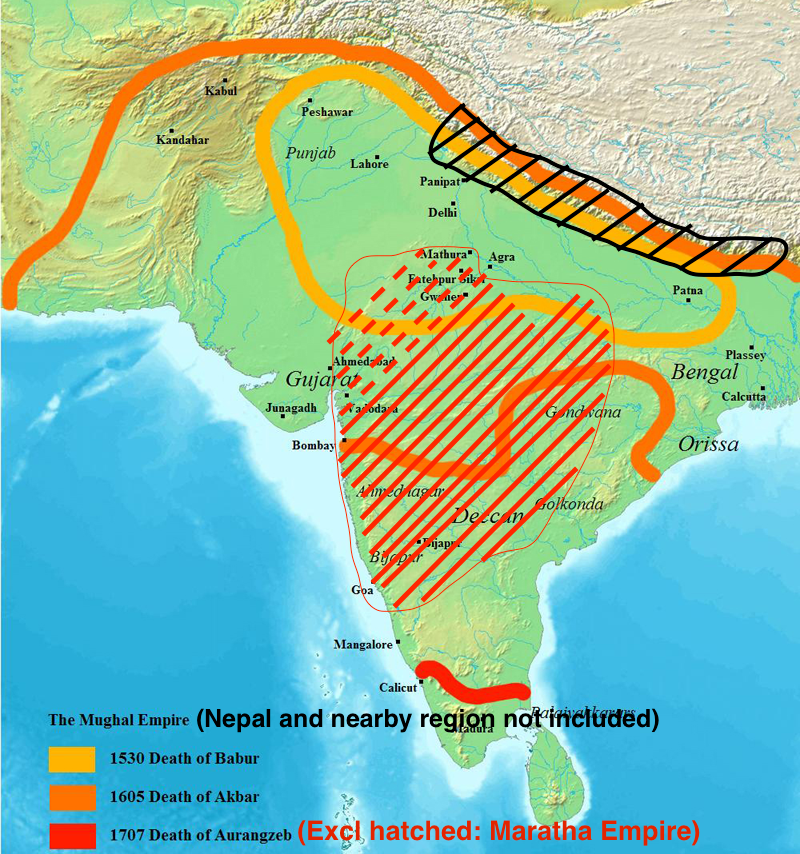
Territoriy of the Mughal Empire from time to time

The societal reforms of the Mughal empire following Ahmad Sirhindi's methodology had several targets which he aimed to convey. He believed that to reform society, one must convey his thoughts to the following six types of people, in various societal positions:

1. The non-governmental influential class
2. Members of the imperial courts
3. The king
4. Scholars
5. Heretics and ignorant Sufis
6. Liberal scholars

At the same time, Ahmad Sirhindi personally accepted the use of Ijtihad and Qiyas in Fiqh and defended the use of both. Ahmad Sirhindi argued that Qiyas and Itjihad are not Bidʻah (heresy).

Regarding Hindu practice, Ahmad Sirhindi condemned the idea put forward by some Hindu thinkers, such as Hardai Ram, that the Bhakti movement was identical with Islamic mysticism.

=== Philosophy ===
Ahmad Sirhindi's opposition to emperor Akbar regarding Din-i Ilahi's syncretic belief were recorded in fourth volume of Tarikh-e-Dawat-o-Azeemat. Ahmad Sirhindi also rejected the ideas of philosophy, particularly those rooted from Greek philosophy. Furthermore, Sirhindi criticize the method of interpretating the meaning of Quran with philosophy.

Ahmad Sirhindi view regarding some of teachings found in Ibn Arabi's teaching in Waḥdat al-Wujūd. He argued that the doctrine of Ibn Arabi is incompatible with Islam. In his book, Ahmad Sirhindi criticized the doctrine of Waḥdat al-Wujūd, by saying in his book, Al-Muntakhabaat Min Al-Maktubaat, that God is never united with anything, and nothing can be united with God. Ahmad Sirhindi argued that forms of pantheism were components of Hinduism. He rejected the core idea of Ibn Arabi that the creation could unite with the Creator, i.e., God.

Despite this, Sirhindi still used Ibn al-'Arabi's vocabulary without hesitation. William C. Chittick, an expert of Ibn 'Arabi biography, argued that Ahmad Sirhindi seems oblivious of Ibn 'Arabi doctrines, as the Imam insisted that Wahdat al-Wujud were "inadequate expression" which should be supplanted by his concept of Wahdat ash-Shuhud which Chittick claimed is just similar in essence. Ahmad Sirhindi advanced the notion of Wahdat ash-Shuhūd (oneness of appearance). According to this doctrine, the experience of unity between God and creation is purely subjective and occurs only in the mind of the Sufi who has reached the state of fana' fi Allah (to forget about everything except Almighty Allah). Sirhindi considered Wahdat ash-Shuhūd to be superior to Wahdat al-Wujūd (oneness of being), which he understood to be a preliminary step on the way to the Absolute Truth.

Aside from the doctrine of pantheism of Ibn 'Arabi, Ahmad Sirhindi also expressed his opposition towards the idea of Metempsychosis or the migration of soul from one body to another.

=== Shia ===
Sirhindi also wrote a treatise under the title "Radd-e-Rawafiz" to justify the execution of Shia nobles by Abdullah Khan Uzbek in Mashhad. Ahmad Sirhindi argues that since the Shiite were cursing the first three Rashidun caliphs; Abu Bakr, Umar, and Uthman, and also chastising the Wives of Muhammad, he advocated for the oppression towards Shiite and supported the destruction of their buildings and confiscating their properties. Ahmad Sirhindi also expressed his hate towards Shias in his letters, where according to him, the worst distorters of faith "are those who bear malice against the companions of Prophet Muhammad. God has called them Kafirs in the Quran." In a letter to his discple Sheikh Farid, the Mir Bakhshi of the Mughal Empire, he said that showing respect to the distorters of faith (Ahl-e-Bidʻah) amounted to destruction of Islam. Ahmad Sirhindi believed the Shia, Mahdawi, and the mystics were responsible for the decline of Sunni Muslim unity in India.

=== Sikh ===
Ahmad Sirhindi recorded his hostility towards the Sikhs. In his Makutbat letter 193, he is said to have stated [sic]:

"The execution of the accused Kafir of Goindwal at this time is a very good achievement indeed and has become the cause of a great defeat of hateful Hindus. With whatever intention they are killed and with whatever objective they are destroyed it is a meritorious act for the Muslims. Before this Kafir was killed, I have seen a dream that Emperor of the day had destroyed the crown of the head of Shirk or infidelity. It is true that this infidel was the chief of the infidels and a leader of the Kafirs. The object of levying Jazia on them is to humiliate and insult the Kafirs and Jehad against them and hostility towards them are the necessities of the Muhammedan faith."

— Ahmad Sirhindi, No. 193 in Part III of Vol. I of Muktubat-i-Imam Rubbani Hazrat Mujaddid-i-Alf-i-Sani

As a hard-line supporter of Islamic orthodoxy and a highly influential religious revivalist, Ahmad Sirhindi had opposed Akbar's policy of religious tolerance. He had concerns about the spread of Sikhism in Punjab. So, he cheered on the murder of the Guru, thus giving it a religious rather than political colour.

=== Sufi ===
One of the biggest criticism of Ahmad Sirhindi towards the ritual and practice of his contemporary Sufi community was their neglection of Sharia, since he viewed those who followed Sufi Tariqa viewed that Sharia is not enough for pursuing Ma'rifa. Ahmad Sirhindi even goes so far that in his book he branded such kind of Sufi who abandon Sharia as apostates.

Ahmad Sirhindi's teaching emphasized the inter-dependence of both the Sufi path and Sharia, stating that "what is outside the path shown by the prophet is forbidden." In his criticism of the superficial jurists, he states: "For a worm hidden under a rock, the sky is the bottom of the rock." Meanwhile, Muhammad ibn Ahmad Hamid ad-Din al Farghani ad-Dimasyqi al-Hanafi, a Hanafite scholar who lived during 9th AH, recorded in his book, Jihad Ulama al-Hanafiyat fi 'Ibthal 'Aqaa'id al-Quburiyya, that Ahmad Sirhindi were one of Hanafite Imam who opposed the practice of Quburiyyun among Sufist.

According to Simon Digby, "modern hagiographical literature emphasizing Ahmad Sirhindi effort for strict Islamic orthodoxy, Sharia and religious observance." modern scholar Yohanan Friedmann also noted about the commitment of Ahmad Sirhindi in exhotation about Sharia or practical observance Islam remains extreme, despite his huge focus on the discourse about Sufi experience. However, Friedman in his other works claims Ahmad Sirhindi was primarily focusing on towards discourse of Sufism in mysticism instead.

Ahmad Sirhindi had originally declared the "reality of the Quran" (haqiqat-i quran) and "the reality of the Kaaba" (haqiqat-i ka'ba-yi rabbani) to be above the reality of Muhammad (haqiqat-i Muhammadi). This notion were deemed controversial by his contemporary, as it caused furor and opposition among certain Sufi followers and Ulama in Hejaz. Sirhindi responded to their criticism by stating that while the reality of Muhammad is superior to any creature, he is not meant to be worshipped through Sujud or prostrations, in contrast with Kaaba, which God commanded to be the direction of prostration or Qibla.

== Legacy ==
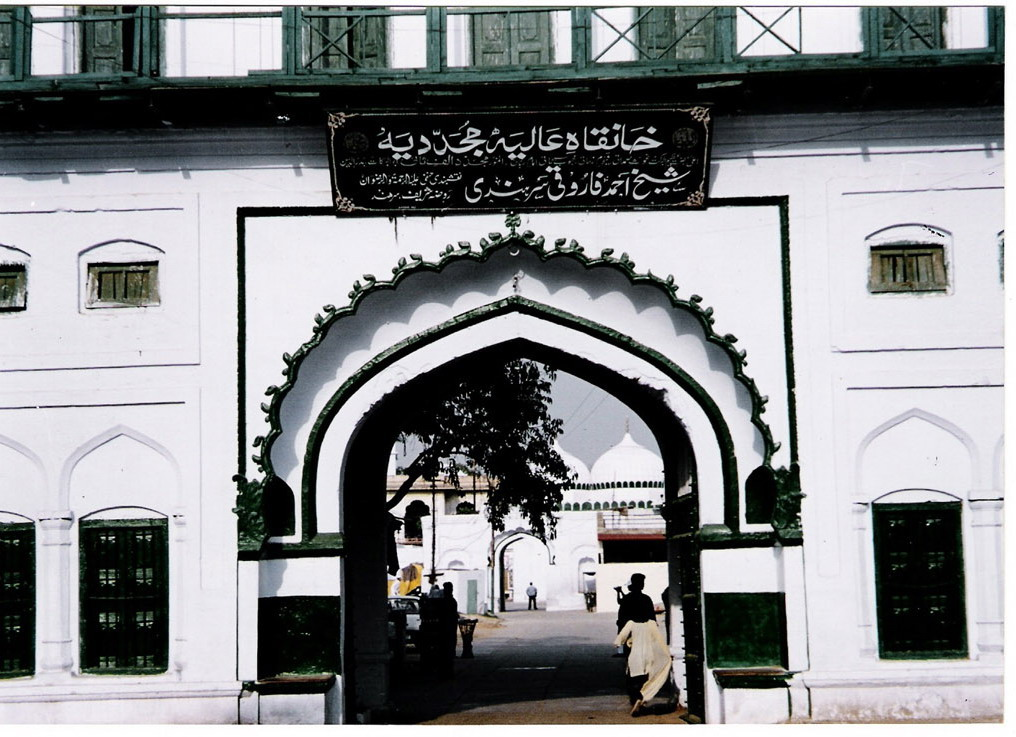
Tomb of Ahmad Sirhindi, Sirhindi's Shrine, known as Rauza Sharif

The shrine of Ahmad Sirhindi, known as Rauza Sharif, is located in Sirhind, Punjab, India.

Ahmet Özel from Atatürk University has reported in his work on Diyanet İslâm Ansiklopedisi, el-Alemgiriyye, that some of Ahmad Sirhindi works were compiled in Fatawa 'Alamgiri.

=== Islamic orthodoxy ===
There are at least 60 kind of Maktubat (letters) recorded from Ahmad Sirhindi which he delivered to various notables, officials, and shaykhs during his life.

Due to his fervent orthodoxy, Ahmad Sirhindi's followers bestowed him the title of Mujaddid. For his role to the medieval southeast Asia Islamic community, the Islamic politician Muhammad Iqbal called Ahmad Sirhindi as "the Guardian of the wherewithal the Community". During 16th century, a Pantheism religious movements of Wahdat al wajood that are championed by Dara Shikoh, Sarmad Kashani, and Bawa Lal Dayal. However, these movement were opposed by Ahmad Sirhindi, Khwaja Muhammad Masum and Ghulam Yahya. Ahmad Sirhindi was noted as being influential here as his release of strong criticism of Ibn Arabi pantheism caused the movement received significant setbacks.

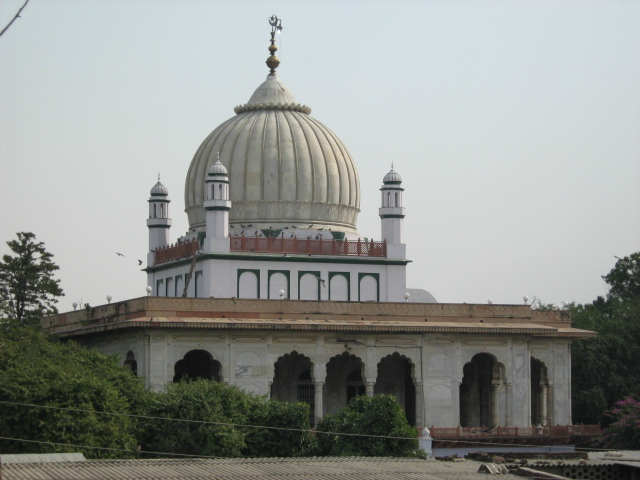
Tomb of Mujaddid-e-Alf-e-Sani

According to Mohammad Yasin in his work, A Social History of Islamic India, the impact of Ahmad Sirhindi in Muslim community in 17th century for reversing the spread of heterodox thinking was seen as huge success. Yohanan Friedmann has noted that according to many modern historians and thinkers, the puritanical thought of Ahmad Sirhindi has inspired the religious orthodoxy of emperor Aurangzeb. This was noted by how Ahmad Sirhindi managed to influence the successor of emperor Akbar, starting from Jahangir, into reversing Akbar's policies, such as lifting marriage age limits, mosque abolishments, and Hijra methodology revival which was abandoned by his father. It is noted by historians that this influence has been significantly recorded during the conquest of Kangra under Jahangir, that at the presence of Ahmad Sirhindi who observed the campaign, the Mughal forces had the Idols broken, a cow slaughtered, Khutbah sermon read, and other Islamic rituals performed. Further mark of Jahangir's departure from Akbar's secular policy was recorded by Terry, a traveller, who came and observed the Indian region between 1616 and 1619, where he found the mosques full of worshippers, the exaltation of Quran and Hadith practical teaching, and the complete observance of Fasting during Ramadan and Eid al-Fitr celebrations.

Gerardus Willebrordus Joannes Drewes argues that the influences of Ahmad Sirhindi idea of Islamic reformation and anti Ibn Arabi's pantheism has spread as far as Aceh, with the indication of how Aceh Sultanate scholar Nuruddin ar-Raniri seems held the similar view with Ahmad Sirhindi regarding he rejection against Ibn Arabi.

His letters (Maktubat) also circulated and was translated into Turkish by a historian and dervish named Müstakimzade Sa'deddin Efendi (d. 1788). His influence was also noted to have reached the Naqshbandis of the Ottoman Empire, as the order, adhering the view of Ahmad Sirhindi, completely reject Ibn Arabi's Wahdat al-Wujd doctrine in the early 18th century.

Abul A'la Maududi, modern Hanafite thinker and political activist, were recorded to quote Ahmad Sirhindi role in opposing the "religious impurities" which were introduced by Akbar earlier:

This [Akbar's din-i dewa] was the first great sedition (fitna) that sought to absorb Muslims in territorial nationalism by spreading atheism and irreligiosity.... Shaykh Ahmad Sirhindi unfurled the flag of jihad precisely against this. It was the impact of that very impious era that gave birth to Dara Shikoh [Akbar's great grandson who carried on theological eclecticism]. To eradicate this poison, Alamgir [popularly known as Aurangzeb, Dara Shikoh's brother] struggled for fifty years. And this very poison eventually destroyed the political power of Muslims. (1938: 61)

Abul A'la Maududi

According to Chanfi Ahmed, many historians regards Ahmad Sirhindi as the pioneer of Islamic reformism of Salafism in seventeenth century India. Although Chanfi Ahmed regards the movement were marked by Shah Waliullah Dehlawi instead. Gamal al-Banna instead opined that Ahmad Sirhindi was influencing Shah Waliullah Dehlawi in reviving the science of Hadith in northern India.

In field of Hadith scholarships, Ahmad Sirhindi also wrote commentary or sharh of Sahih al-Tirmidhi.

=== Naqshbandi Sufism ===
By the latter part of the nineteenth century, the consensus of the Naqshbandi community had placed the prophetic realities closer to God than the divine realities. The rationale for this development may have been to neutralize unnecessary discord with the large Muslim community whose emotional attachment to Muhammad was greater than any understanding of philosophical fine points.

Ahmad Sirhindi criticize the practice of Khalwa or ascetism by calling it as heresy, due to no arguments that showed that the early generations of Muslims practiced it.

Naqshbandi Sufis claim that Ahmad Sirhindi is descended from a long line of "spiritual masters" which were claimed by the order:

1. Muhammad, d. 11 AH, buried in Medina, Saudi Arabia (570/571–632 CE)
2. Abu Bakar Siddique, d. 13 AH, buried in Medina, Saudi Arabia
3. Salman al-Farsi, d. 35 AH, buried in Madaa'in, Saudi Arabia
4. Qasim ibn Muhammad ibn Abi Bakr, d. 107 AH, buried in Medina, Saudi Arabia.
5. Jafar Sadiq, d. 148 AH, buried in Medina, Saudi Arabia.
6. Bayazid Bastami, d. 261 AH, buried in Bastaam, Iran (804 - 874 CE).
7. Abu al-Hassan al-Kharaqani, d. 425 AH, buried Kharqaan, Iran.
8. Abul Qasim Gurgani, d. 450 AH, buried in Gurgan, Iran.
9. Abu ali Farmadi, d. 477 AH, buried in Tous, Khorasan, Iran.
10. Abu Yaqub Yusuf Hamadani, d. 535 AH, buried in Maru, Khorosan, Iran.
11. Abdul Khaliq Ghujdawani, d. 575 AH, buried in Ghajdawan, Bukhara, Uzbekistan.
12. Arif Riwgari, d. 616 AH, buried in Reogar, Bukhara, Uzbekistan.
13. Mahmood Anjir-Faghnawi, d. 715 AH, buried in Waabakni, Mawarannahr, Uzbekistan.
14. Azizan Ali Ramitani, d. 715 AH, buried in Khwarezm, Bukhara, Uzbekistan.
15. Mohammad Baba As-Samasi, d. 755 AH, buried in Samaas, Bukhara, Uzbekistan.
16. Amir Kulal, d. 772 AH, buried in Saukhaar, Bukhara, Uzbekistan.
17. Baha-ud-Din Naqshband Bukhari, d. 791 AH, buried in Qasr-e-Aarifan, Bukhara, Uzbekistan (1318–1389 CE).
18. Sayyid Alauddin Atar Bukhari, buried in Jafaaniyan, Mawranahar, Uzbekistan.
19. Yaqub al-Charkhi, d. 851 AH, buried in Tajikistan
20. Khwaja Ahrar, d. 895 AH, buried in Samarkand, Uzbekistan.
21. Muhammad Zahid Wakhshi, d. 936 AH, buried in Wakhsh, Malk Hasaar, Tajikistan
22. Darwish Muhammad, d. 970 AH, buried in Samarkand, Uzbekistan
23. Muhammad Amkanagi, d. 1008 AH, buried in Akang, Bukhara, Uzbekistan
24. Khwaja Baqi Billah, d. 1012 AH, buried in Delhi, India
25. Ahmad al-Farūqī al-Sirhindī (Ahmad Sirhindi, subject of this article)

== Works ==
Title	Original language	English title	Brief description
Maktubat-e-Imam Rabbani (مکتوبات امام ربانی)	Persian	Letters of Imam Rabbani	A collection of letters addressing theology, Sufism, religious reform, and adherence to Sunni orthodoxy; regarded as his principal work.
Ithbat al-Nubuwwa (اثبات النبوت)	Persian	Affirmation of Prophethood	A theological treatise defending the necessity and finality of prophethood against philosophical and mystical interpretations.
Asrar al-Tashahhud (اسرار التشہد)	Arabic	The Mysteries of the Tashahhud	A short work interpreting the spiritual meanings of the tashahhud prayer formula.

== See also ==
- Mujaddid
- Ali Hujwiri
- Shaykh Yaqub Sarfi Kashmiri

== Bibliography ==
- Abdul Haq Ansari (2001). Merajut Tradisi Syari'ah Sufisme: "Mengkaji Gagasan Mujaddid Syeikh Ahmad Sirhindi" [Weaving the Sharia Tradition of Sufism: "Examining the Ideas of Mujaddid Sheikh Ahmad Sirhindi"] (in Indonesian). Translated by Achmad Nashir Budiman. Jakarta, Indonesia: Raja Grafindo Persada. ISBN 979-421-236-9.
- Annemarie Schimmel (2004). K. Waghmar, Burzine (ed.). The Empire of the Great Mughals: History, Art and Culture (illustrated, reprint, revised ed.). Reaktion Books. ISBN 1-86189-185-7.
- Dr. Burhan Ahmad Faruqi, Mujaddid's Conception of Tawhid, 1940
- Shari'at and Ulama in Ahmad Sirhindi's Collected Letters by Arthur F. Buehler.
- Heehs, Peter (2002). Indian Religions: A Historical Reader of Spiritual Expression and Experience. New York University Press. ISBN 978-0-8147-3649-4.
- Malik, Adnan; Zubair, Muhammad; Parveen, Uzman (2016). "Effects of social reforms of shaykh Ahmad sirhindi (1564-1624) on muslim society in the sub continent". Journal of Social Sciences and Humanities. 55 (2): 155–164. doi:10.46568/jssh.v55i2.70.
- Ahmad, Aziz (1999) [1964]. Studies in Islamic Culture in the Indian Environment. Oxford University Press. ISBN 0-19-564464-6.
- Friedmann, Yohannan (2000). Shaikh Aḥmad Sirhindī: An Outline of His Thought and a Study of His Image in the Eyes of Posterity. New Delhi: Oxford University Press. ISBN 0-19-565239-8.
- Haar, J.G.J. ter.; Friedmann, Yohanan (1992). "Follower and Heir of the Prophet: Shaykh Ahmad Sirhindi (1564-1624) as Mystic". Journal of the American Oriental Society. 114 (3). Leiden: 460. doi:10.2307/605091. JSTOR 605091.
- Buehler, Arthur (2011). Revealed Grace: The Juristic Sufism of Aḥmad Sirhindi (1564-1624). Louisville, Kentucky: Fons Vitae.
- K. Mishra, Ravi (2019). "Islam in India and the Rise of Wahhabism". India International Centre Quarterly. 46 (2): 1–30. JSTOR 26856495.
- M. Sharif, M. (1966). A History of Muslim Philosophy Volume 2. Kempten, Germany: Pakistan Philosophical Congress; Allgauer Heimatverlag GmbH. pp. 873–883.
- Ahmad, Aziz (1961). "Religious and Political Ideas of Shaikh Ahmad Sirhindī". Rivista degli studi orientali. 36: 259–270. JSTOR 41879388.
- Sajida S. Alvi (1989). "Religion and State during the Reign of Mughal Emperor Jahǎngǐr (1605-27): Nonjuristical Perspectives". Studia Islamica. 69 (69): 95–119. doi:10.2307/1596069. ISSN 0585-5292. JSTOR 1596069.
- Babar Sultan Asadullah Ph.D; Taswar Hussain Ph.D; Uzma Akhlaq Assistant professor (2021). "Religious and Political Reforms and Reconstruction of Mujaddid Alf e Thani in Muslim of sub-continent". Al Aijaz Research Journal of Islamic Studies & Humanities. 5 (3). ISSN 2707-1219.
