= Muhammad Murad Bukhari =

Ottoman Naqshbandi-Mujaddidi Sufi (1640–1720)

Muḥammad Murād al-Bukhārī
- محمد مراد البخاري

Personal life
- Born: c. 1640 Samarkand, Khanate of Bukhara
- Died: c. 1720 Constantinople, Ottoman Empire
- Era: Ottoman era
- Region: Middle East
- Main interest(s): Islamic Law, Islamic philosophy
- Known for: development of tafsir, hadith, fiqh, and other intellectual and traditional sciences.

Religious life
- Religion: Islam
- Denomination: Sunni
- Jurisprudence: Hanafi
- Tariqa: Mujaddidi
- Creed: Maturidi

Muḥammad Murād al-Bukhārī (1640–1720; Arabic: محمد مراد البخاري) was a Central Asian-born Sufi scholar and shaykh of the Naqshbandi-Mujaddidi order, active in the late 17th and early 18th centuries. He played a significant role in spreading Mujaddidi order throughout the Ottoman lands, including Syria and Anatolia.

== Birth and early life ==
Murad was born in Samarkand in 1640 (1050 AH) into a sayyid family. His father was named Ali bin Dawood. He began his religious education at a young age. He was a great scholar of Islamic sciences and had memorized 10,000 Hadith with their chains of narration.

== Spiritual journey ==
Murad migrated to Mughal India to adopt the Mujaddidi order from Khawaja Muhammad Masum, son of Shaykh Ahmad Sirhindi. He completed his spiritual journey in only a week and was given deputyship and asked to teach the order to seekers in the Middle East. He traveled to many lands and places and performed the Hajj pilgrimage multiple times. He established the Naqshbandi-Mujaddidi order in Makkah, Damascus, and Istanbul and stayed at these places for long periods of his life.

== Legacy and influence ==
Murad gained a formidable following among the Ottoman scholarly and bureaucratic elite, including some of the Sultan's close circles. His order, with its strong emphasis on the Sunna and promise of renewal, appealed to reforming circles and the general rise of piety during the "Tulip Period" of the empire. Sultan Mustafa II granted him some villages in Damascus, which remained in the hands of his descendants until the 20th century. He is the ancestor of the al-Muradi family of Damascus, one of their famous members being Muḥammad Khalīl al-Murādī. The Muradiyyah School is attributed to him and among the conditions he stipulated in its endowment deed was that "no tobacco user should reside there." He also built a school in his house in the Souq Sarouja neighborhood, known as the Naqshbandiyya al-Barraniyya, along with a mosque there.

== Literary works ==
Murad authored many books, treatises, articles and letters. One of his well known books is al-Mufarridāt al-Qur’ānīya, written in three languages (Arabic, Persian, Turkish).

== Death and burial ==
Murad eventually settled permanently in Constantinople, where he died in 1720 at the age of 80. He is buried in the Fatih District of Istanbul. The branch of the Mujaddidiiyya order he founded became known as the Muradiyya, and was led by his descendants after his death.
