= Khâlid-i Shahrazuri =

Kurdish Sufi mystic and poet (1779–1827)

Khâlid-i Baghdâdî

Personal life
- Born: c. 1779 Qaradagh, near Sulaymaniyah, Ottoman Iraq
- Died: 5 June 1827 A.D/11th Dhu'l-Qa'da, 1242 A.H (aged 48) Damascus, Ottoman Syria

Religious life
- Religion: Islam
- Denomination: Sunni
- Jurisprudence: Shafi'i
- Tariqa: Naqshbandi
- Creed: Ash'ari
- Profession: Islamic scholar, Sufi

Muslim leader
- Influenced by: Shaykh Abdul Karam al-Barzinji, Shaykh Abdur Rahim al-Barzinji, Shah Waliullah Dehlawi
- Influenced: Ismail Sirajuddin Shirvani

Mawlana Khâlid Shahrazuri also known as Khâlid-i Baghdâdî and Mawlana Khalid (Kurdish: مەولانا خالیدی نەقشبەندی, romanized: Mewlana Xalîdî Neqişbendî; 1779–1827) was a Kurdish Sufi, and poet by the name of Shaykh Diya al-Dīn Khalid al-Shahrazuri, the founder of a branch of the Naqshbandi Sufi order - called Khalidi after him - that has had a profound impact not only on his native Kurdish lands but also on many other regions of the western Islamic world. His writings are among the earliest examples of prose and poetry in Central Kurdish. His full name was generally given as Abū al-Bahāʾ Ḍiyāʾ al-Dīn Khālid ibn Aḥmad ibn Ḥusayn al-Shahrazūrī al-Kurdī.

Shahrazuri acquired the epithet Baghdadi through his frequent stays in Baghdad, for it was in the town of Karadağ (Qaradagh) in the Shahrizur region, about 5 miles from Sulaymaniyah, that he was born in 1779.

== Biography ==
He was born in the year 1779 in the village of Karadağ, near the city of Sulaymaniyah, in what is now Iraqi Kurdistan. His family belonged to the Jaff tribe that claimed descent from the 3rd caliph Uthman. Hence, the attribution al-'Uthmani is sometimes added to his name. He was raised and trained in Sulaymaniyah, where there were many schools and many mosques and which was considered the primary educational city of his time. Young Khalid studied with the two great scholars of his time, Shaykh `Abdul Karam al-Barzinji and Shaykh `Abdur Rahim al-Barzinji, and he read with Mullah Muhammad `Ali. He became a respected teacher in Sulaymaniyah before undertaking his famous journey to India. There he met the renowned Naqshbandi-Mujaddidi master Shah Waliullah Dehlawi in Delhi. Khalid spent approximately a year with him and received initiation into the Naqshbandi order.

One of his disciples, Ismail Sirajuddin Shirvani facilitated the spread of the Khalidiyya branch of the Order to the Caucasus, triggering the Murid War.

He died in Damascus in 1827, during an outbreak of plague, and was buried on Mount Qasioun.

== See also ==
- Sharh al-'Aqa'id al-Nasafiyya
- List of famous Sufis
- List of Kurdish people
- List of Kurdish philosophers
- List of Ash'aris and Maturidis
- List of Muslim theologians

== Sources ==
- Classical Islam and the Naqshbandi Sufi Tradition, Shaykh Muhammad Hisham Kabbani, Islamic Supreme Council of America (June 2004), ISBN 1-930409-23-0.
- E.F. Haydari, Al-Majd al-taled fi manaqeb al-sheikh Khalid, Istanbul 1874
- S. M. Stern, Islamic Philosophy & the Classical Tradition, Oxford 1972
- Hamid Algar, The Naqshbandi Order, Studia Islamica 1976
