= Khwaja Baqi Billah =

Naqshbandi Sufi saint

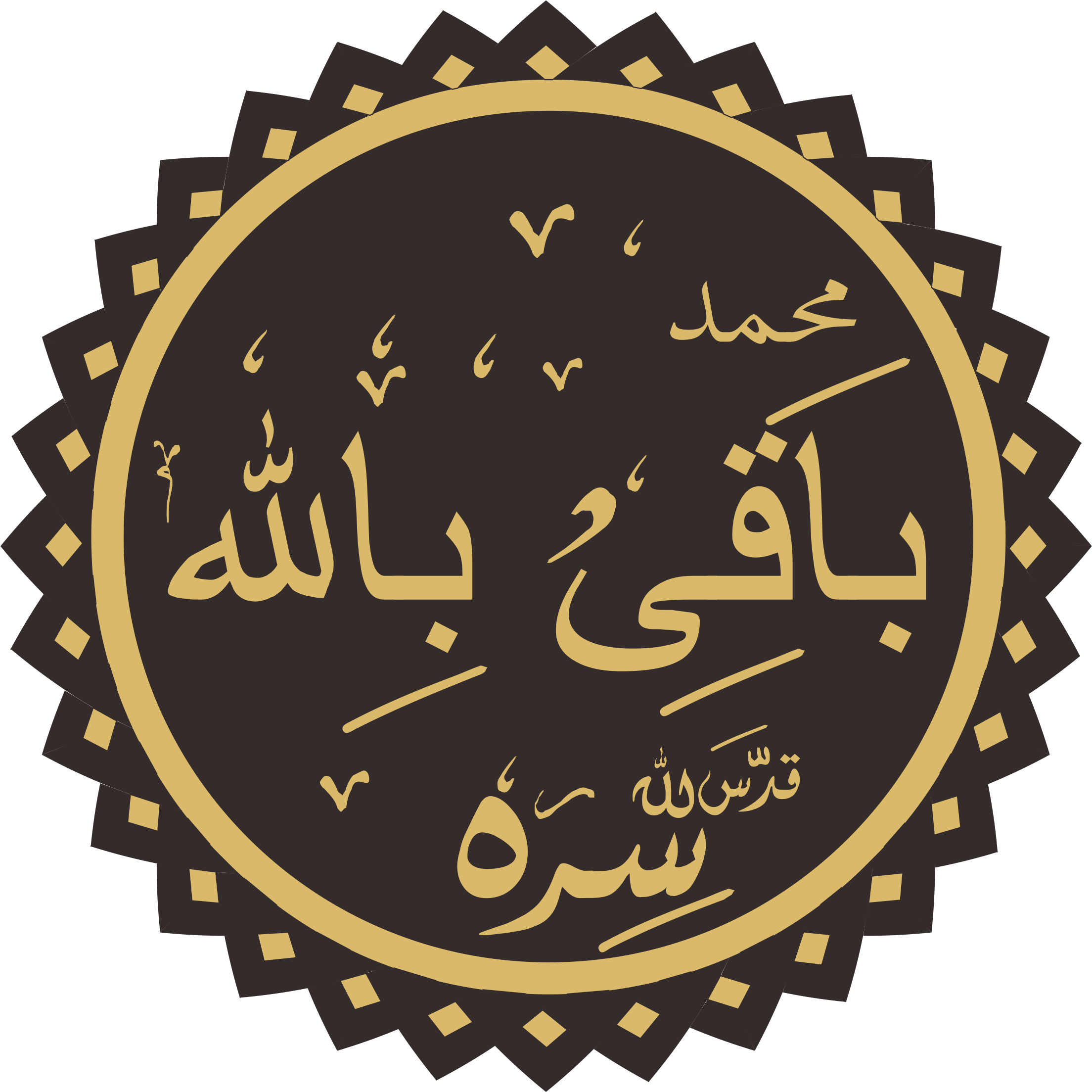

Personal life
- Born: 14 July 1564 Kabul, Mughal Empire
- Died: 29 November 1603 (aged 39) Delhi, Mughal Empire
- Resting place: Nabi Karim, Delhi
- Parent: Qāzī Abd as-Salām Khalji Samarqandī Quraishi (father)
- Main interest(s): Implementation of Islamic law, Islamic statehood
- Notable idea(s): Evolution of Islamic philosophy, application of Sharia
- Pen name: Berang

Religious life
- Religion: Islam
- Denomination: Sunni
- Jurisprudence: Hanafi
- Tariqa: Naqshbandi
- Creed: Maturidi

Muslim leader
- Influenced by: Muhammad Amkanagi
- Influenced: Ahmad Sirhindi

Khwaja Baqi Billah (Persian: خواجه باقی بالله) also known as Khwaja Muhammad Baqi, with his pen name Berang, (14 July 1564– 29 November 1603), was a Sufi saint from Kabul. He was a disciple of Khwaja Muhammad Amkanagi and the pioneer of the Naqshbandi Order in the Indian subcontinent.

== Birth ==
Baqi Billah was the originator and pioneer of the Naqshbandi Order in the Indian subcontinent. His father Abd as-Salām Khalji Samarqandī Quraishi was a scholar and saint from Kabul. His Takhallus (pen name) was "Berang", which literally means colorless or invisible.

== Death ==
He died on 14 Jumada II 1012 AH (29 November 1603) and is buried in the Nabi Karim area of Delhi.

== Works ==
| Title | Original language | English title | Brief description |
|---|---|---|---|
| Maktubat-e-Khwaja Baqi Billah | Persian | Letters of Khwaja Baqi Billah | A collection of letters addressing spiritual training, Sufi discipline, and Naqshbandi teachings; considered his principal work. |
| Risala-e-Ahwal wa Ma‘arif | Persian | Treatise on Spiritual States and Knowledge | A short Sufi treatise discussing inner states, spiritual awareness, and the path of self-purification. |
| Ta‘limat-e-Naqshbandiyya | Persian | Teachings of the Naqshbandi Order | A concise exposition of Naqshbandi principles, practices, and ethical discipline. |
