= Khawaja Muhammad Masum =

Indian Naqshbandi-Mujaddidi Sufi (1599–1668)

Khawāja Muḥammad Maʿṣūm ibn Ahmad al-Fārūqī al-Sirhindī
- محمد معصوم بن أحمد
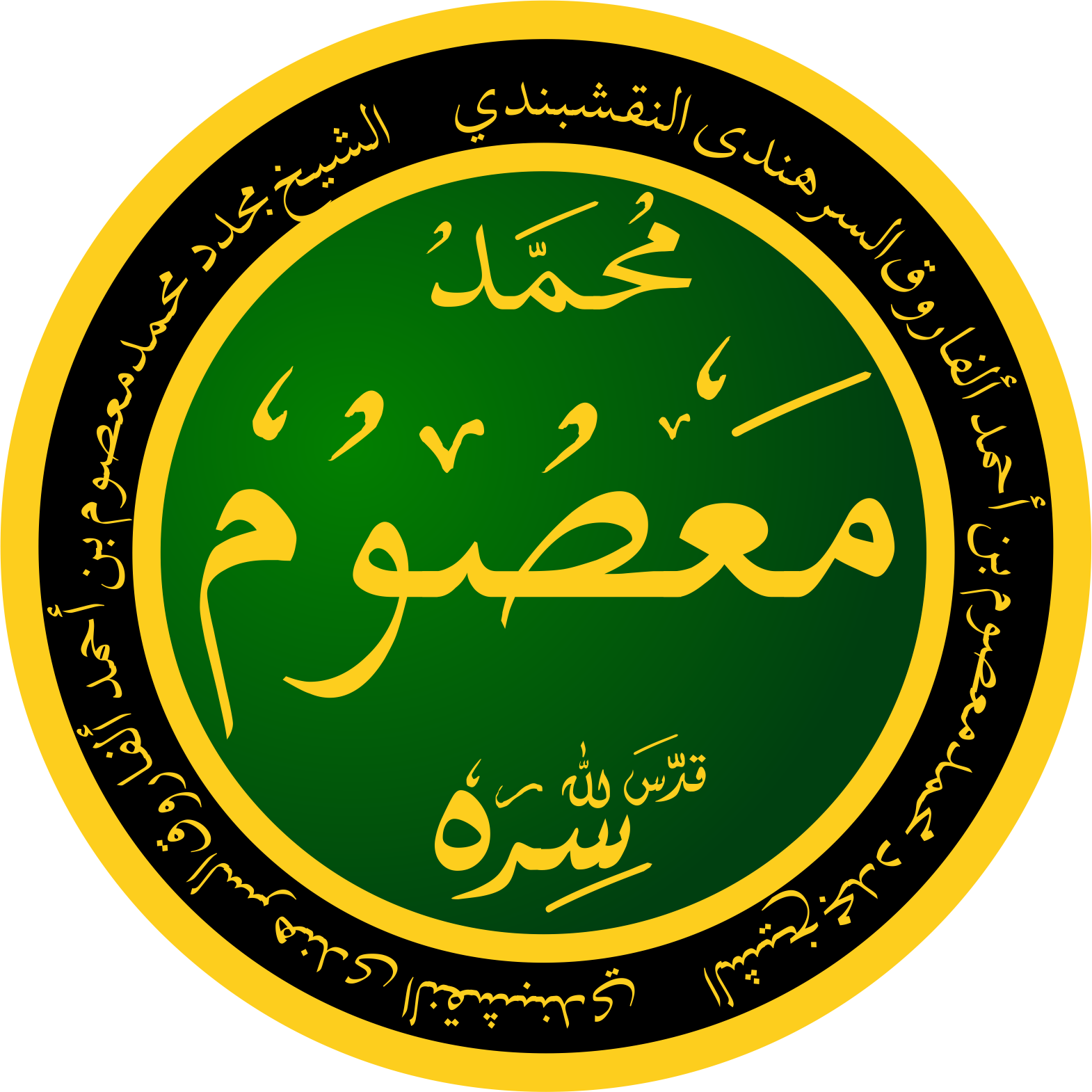
- Title: Maʿṣūm-i Thānī

Personal life
- Born: 26 May 1599 Sirhind, Lahore Subah, Mughal Empire (modern-day Punjab, India)
- Died: 16 August 1668 (aged 69) Sirhind, Lahore Subah, Mughal Empire
- Children: 12
- Era: Mughal India
- Region: Indian sub-continent
- Main interest(s): Islamic Law, Islamic philosophy
- Notable idea: Evolution of Islamic philosophy Application of Islamic law

Religious life
- Religion: Islam
- Denomination: Sunni
- Jurisprudence: Hanafi
- Tariqa: Naqshbandi-Mujaddidi
- Creed: Maturidi

Muslim leader
- Predecessor: Ahmad Sirhindi
- Successor: Khawaja Muhammad Saif ad-Dīn
- Influenced: Aurangzeb
- Arabic name
- Personal (Ism): Muḥammad Maʿṣūm محمد معصوم
- Patronymic (Nasab): Ahmad أحمد
- Epithet (Laqab): Khawāja خواجة
- Toponymic (Nisba): al-Fārūqī al-Sirhindī الفاروقي السرهندي

Khawāja Muḥammad Maʿṣūm (Urdu/Persian: خواجہ محمد معصوم ;1599–1668), also known as Maʿṣūm-i Thānī (“the Second Maʿṣūm”), was an Indian Naqshbandī-Mujaddidī Sufi master, Islamic scholar and the son and principal successor of Shaykh Ahmad Sirhindi (d. 1624), the founder of the Mujaddidi branch of the Naqshbandi order. He is widely revered in South Asian Islamic history as the Urwat-ul-Wuthqa (The Unbreakable Bond/Rope of Allah) and the Qayyum-i-Thani (The Second Qayyum).

== Personal life ==
Masum had six sons and six daughters. The sons were:

1. Shaykh Muḥammad Ṣibghat-Allāh Sirhindī
2. Shaykh Muḥammad Ḥujjat-Allāh Sirhindī
3. Shaykh Muḥammad ʿUbayd-Allāh Sirhindī
4. Shaykh Muḥammad ʾAshraf Sirhindī
5. Shaykh Muḥammad Saif ad-Dīn Sirhindī
6. Shaykh Muḥammad Ṣiddīq Sirhindī

== Death and burial ==
He died on 16th August 1668 CE (9th Rabīʿul ʾAwwal 1079 Hijrī). He was buried alongside his father.

== Succession and legacy ==
He was succeeded by his son, Khawaja Muhammad Saif ad-Dīn, who continued his father's work. His shrine serves as a major site of reverence in Sirhind, located near his father's mausoleum. His descendants became known collectively as the Maʿṣūmī family, many of whom remained important religious figures.
