= Pierre de Jarric =

Pierre de Jarric (1566 – 2 March 1617), also known as Pierre du Jarric, was a French Catholic missionary writer from Toulouse.

Jarric entered the Society of Jesus on 8 December 1582 and taught philosophy and moral theology at Bordeaux for many years. Although he desired to join the missionaries of his order, his wish was not fulfilled. Instead, he dedicated himself to writing on their behalf. The result was Histoire des choses plus memorables advenues tant ez Indes orientales, que autres païs de la descouverte des Portugois, which appeared in three parts: the second of which appeared in 1610 and the third in 1614.

Jarric's work gives a comprehensive picture of the missionary enterprises of the Jesuits up to 1610, chiefly within the sphere of Portuguese interests. It contains much valuable data on colonial history, geography, and ethnography, taken from Spanish and Portuguese reports, and from the works of Luis de Guzman (Hist. de las Missiones que han hecho los religiosos de la Compañia de Jesús), and of Ferdinand Guerreiro (Relação Annal das cousas que fizeram os Padres da companhia de Jesus na India e Japão, Brazil, Angola, Cabo Verde, Guiné). By dedicating the second part to King Louis XIII, Jarric hoped to encourage the French king to imitate Spain and Portugal in their colonization efforts. His work was frequently reprinted and widely circulated, particularly after it was translated into Latin by Martino Martinez III around 1615. Jarric died in Saintes, Charente-Maritime two years later.
