= Muhammad Zahid Wakhshi =

15th and 16th-century Indian Sufi philosopher, in Central Asia

Personal life
- Born: 852 AH (1448/1449 CE) Vakash Tajikistan
- Died: 936 AH (1529/1530 CE)
- Main interest(s): Islamic Law, Islamic philosophy

Religious life
- Religion: Islam
- Denomination: Sunni
- Jurisprudence: Hanafi
- Tariqa: Naqshbandi
- Creed: Maturidi

Muslim leader
- Influenced by: Khwaja Ahrar
- Influenced: Darwish Muhammad

Muhammad Zahid Vakhshi (Persian: محمد زاهد وخشی; 852-936 AH) was a Sufi of the Naqshbandī Sufi order. He lived in Vakhsh (or Vakash), a small town in present-day Tajikistan, about 100 km South of the capital Dushanbe. Naqshbandī The Sufi order from Khwaja Ahrar transferred to him and he transferred to Darwish Muhammad. He was a close relative of Yaqub al-Charkhi, and according to some sources, he was his maternal grandson. His tomb is in Vakhsh.
