= Sayyid Alauddin Attar =

Sufi saint

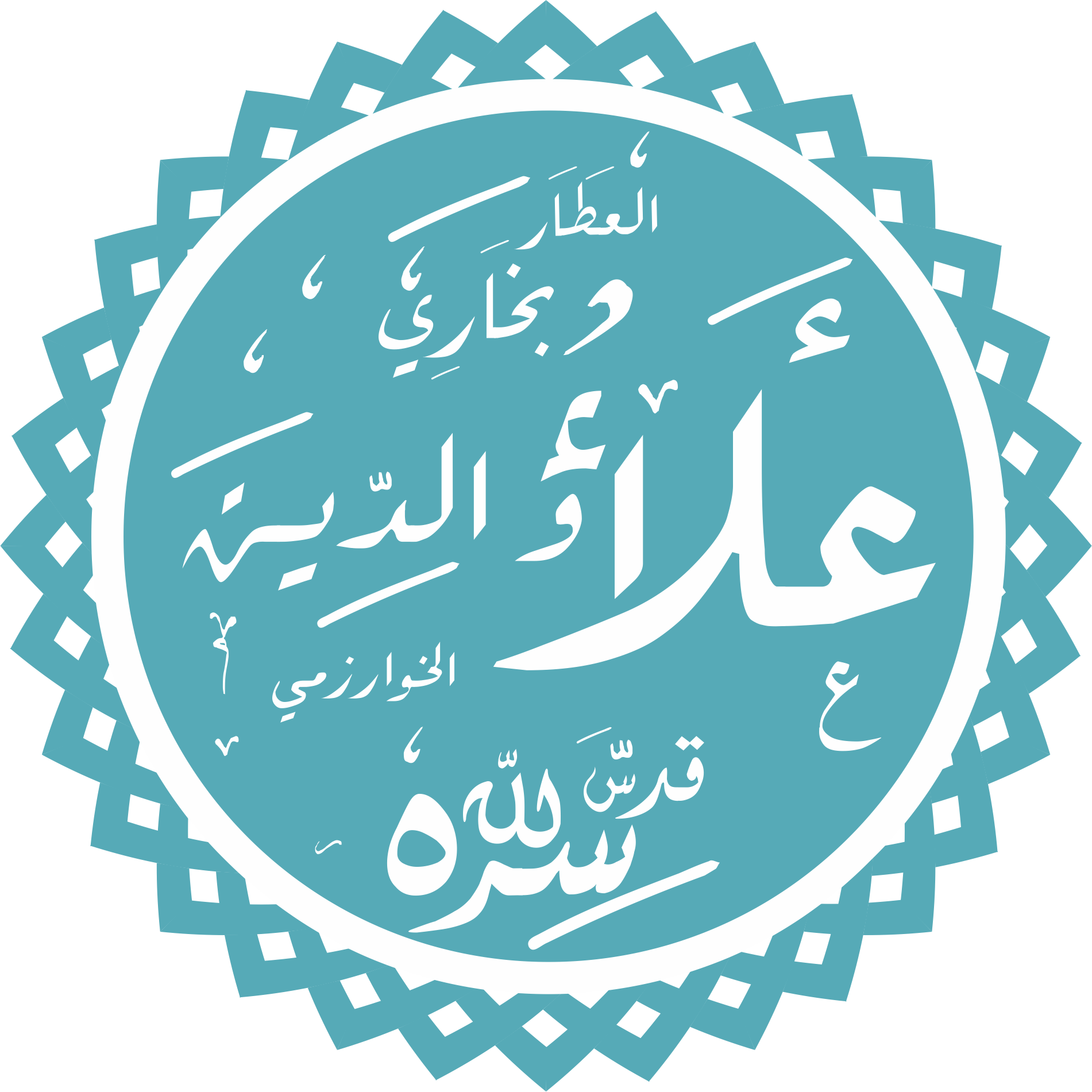
- Born: 1338–1339; Khwarezm
- Died: February 1400–1402
- Resting place: Jafaaniyan, Uzbekistan
- Predecessor: Baha' al-Din Naqshband
- Successor: Yaqub al-Charkhi
- Parent: Sayyid Mir Muhammad Khwarezmi

Sayyid Alauddin Attar was a Sufi Saint from Bukhara and Shaykh of the Naqshbandi Sufi order. He was a descendant of Muhammad and son in law of his master and predecessor Khwaja Bahauddin Naqshband.

== Biography ==
Alauddin Attar was born in Khwarezm in a Sayyid household. His father was Khwaja Muhammad Khwarezmi who has also been an Islamic scholar and Sufi Saint. Khwaja Alauddin Attar was born as Muhammad ibn Muhammad, who then changed his name with the grace of his master Bahauddin Naqshband, due to his superiority as Sufi Saint. Ala, denotes superiority, and din, religion, which was entitled to him.

Alauddin Attar started learning Islamic Sciences from a very young age and accomplished his studies as a young teenager graduating from all contemporary teachers in Bukhara. After his father's demise, he gave all his inheritance from his father to his little brothers. He then got to know Bahauddin Naqshband, who realized his talent.

Alauddin and his master had a very strong emotional relationship that held lifelong. Historical sources compare this relationship with the relationship Jacob had to his son Joseph, for Bahauddin had no son of his own. Bahauddin was so anstonished because of Alauddin's potential as Saint that legends say, he had seen Muhammad himself in a dream, who ordered him to give his daughter's hands in marriage to his descendant Alauddin.

Alauddin issued Khwaja Hasan and Khwaja Hussein, who were the spiritual and judicial heirs of Bahauddin, for he only had two daughters.

== Ancestry ==
According to old historical sources Khwaja Alauddin's ancestry traces back to Muhammad after 19 generations. His lineage is as follows:

- Muhammad
- Fatima al Zahra and Ali ibn Abi Talib
- Imam Hussein ibn Ali
- Imam Ali ibn Hussein Zayn al Abideen
- Imam Muhammad Al-Baqir
- Imam Jafar al-Sadiq
- Imam Musa Al-Kadhim
- Al-Amir Sayyid Mir Ibrahim ibn Musa al-Murtadha
- Sayyid Abu Bakr
- Sayyid Abdul-Haq
- Sayyid Jafar
- Sayyid Muhammad Rumi
- Sayyid Abdullah
- Sayyid Musa
- Sayyid Hussein
- Sayyid Qasim
- Sayyid Abu Bakr Reza
- Sayyid Abdullah Zarbaksh
- Sayyid Muhammad Khwarezmi
- Sayyid Alauddin Attar

== Legacy ==
He taught many accomplished scholars, like Khwaja Yaqub Charkhi, dedicated himself to many charity projects and advised the contemporary rulers, who asked him for advices. His descendants follow his footsteps until today. His descendants are prominent Sufi saints, Islamic scholars, Grand Muftis, preachers, commanders and diplomats. His bloodline and line of succession goes through his two sons Hasan and Hussein.

== Sources ==
- Falahati, Maryam (2015). "ʿAlāʾ al-Dīn ʿAṭṭār Bukhārī". In Madelung, Wilferd; Daftary, Farhad (eds.). Encyclopaedia Islamica Online. Brill Online. ISSN 1875-9831.
