= Khwaja Ahrar =

Sufi master and Islamic scholar (1404–1490)

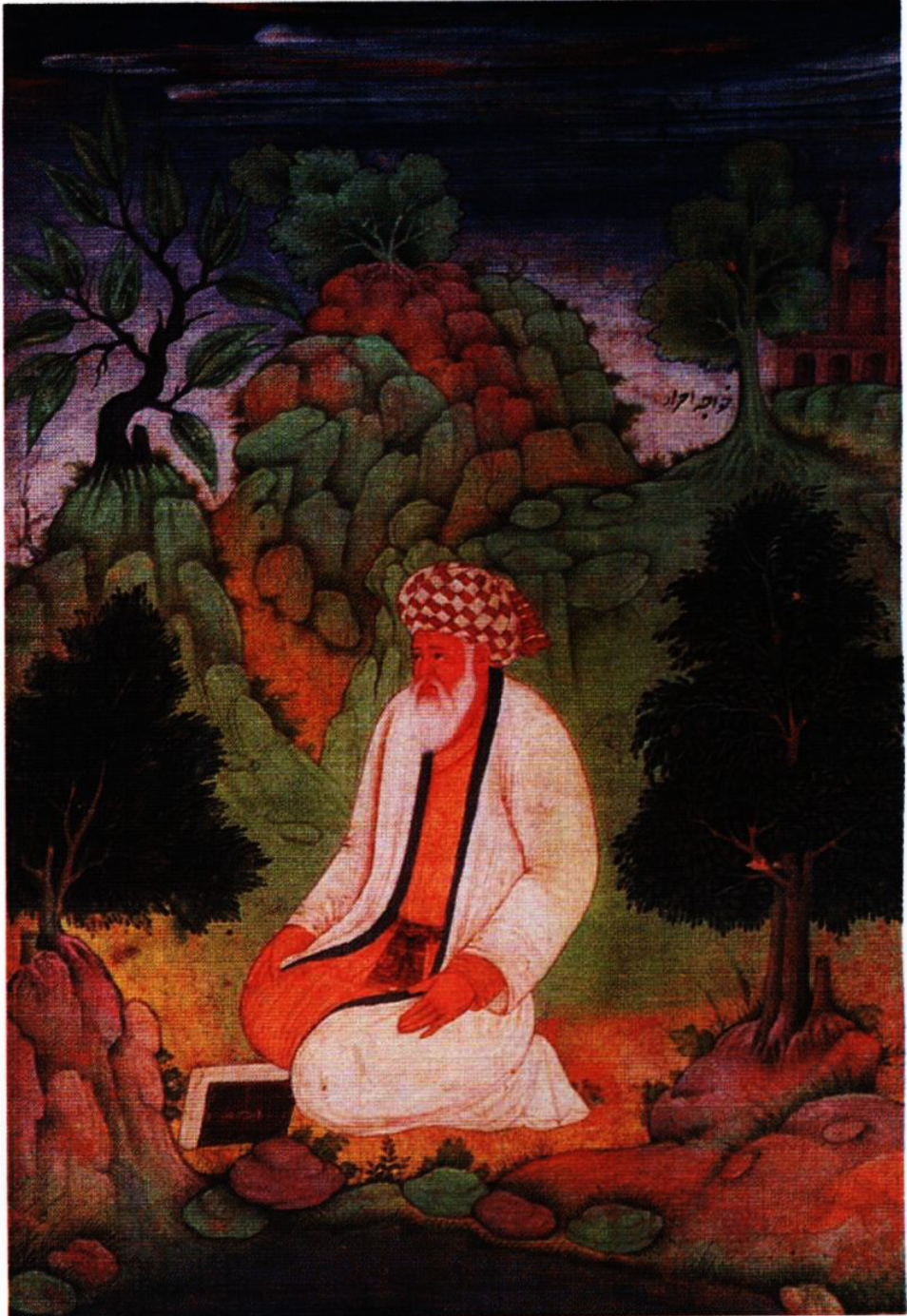
- Khwaja Ahrar, Mughal Empire Archives, British Museum

Personal life
- Born: March 1404 AD Samarkand, Uzbekistan
- Died: 1490 (aged 85–86) AD Samarkand, Uzbekistan

Religious life
- Religion: Islam
- Denomination: Sunni
- Jurisprudence: Hanafi
- Creed: Maturidi

Muslim leader
- Predecessor: Yaqub al-Charkhi
- Successor: Muhammad Zahid Wakhshi
- Arabic name
- Personal (Ism): ʿUbaydullāh عبيد الله
- Patronymic (Nasab): ibn Maḥmūd ibn Shihāb ad-Dīn بن محمود بن شهاب الدين
- Epithet (Laqab): Aḥrār أحرار; Nāṣir ad-Dīn ناصر الدين
- Toponymic (Nisba): at-Tūrānī التوراني

Nāṣir ad-Dīn ʿUbaydullāh ibn Maḥmūd ibn Shihāb ad-Dīn (1404–1490; Arabic: ناصرالدین عبیدالله احرار) more popularly known as Khwaja Ahrar (Persian: خواجه احرار) was a member of the Golden Chain of the Naqshbandi Sufi spiritual order of Central Asia. He was born in Samarkand, a city in Central Asia, to a Muslim family. He was born to Khwaja Mehmood Shashi bin Khwaja Shihabuddin. His forefathers had migrated from Baghdad, and his lineage was connected to Abu Bakr Siddique from his paternal side and Umar Farooq from the maternal side. Khwaja Ahrar was deeply involved in the social, political and economics activities of Transoxania. He was born into a relatively poor yet highly spiritual family and, at the age of maturity, he was probably the richest person in the kingdom. He was a close associate of all the leading dervishes of the time. Maulana Abdur Rahman Jami was a disciple of his. He learned and practiced the secrets of spirituality under his father and later under Khwaja Yaqub Charkhi.

== Birth and family ==
Khwaja's father was a farmer by profession who made the pilgrimage to Mecca. His paternal grandfather, Shahabuddin Shashi was also a farmer and trader. His maternal grandfather Khwaja Daud was the son of Khwaja Khawand Tahur who was an established Sufi mystic and the son of Umar Baghistani, a famous shaikh honoured by Bahauddin Naqshband. His birth took place during the ramadan of 806 Hijri (March 1404) in village near Tashkent called Baghistan. His birth was accompanied by a number of miracles and many saints had predicted the coming of a saint.

He had two sons, Khwaja Khwajgan and Khwaja Yahya.

== Education and learning ==
Initially, Ahrar studied in Tashkent and was taught by his uncle, Ibrahim Shashi. In 1425, his uncle took him to Samarqand for his studies. He repetitively fell sick during studies, making him quit altogether, but his spiritual states developed until he once saw prophet Jesus in his dreams where he said "I will teach you." He interpreted this to mean he would receive religious knowledge but others disagreed and said it meant medical knowledge.

Khwaja Ahrar took his spiritual bayah (spiritual oath) from Yaqub al-Charkhi. He had many disciples but the most famous was the Sufi poet Mawlana Abdur Rahman Jami. Maulana Jami wrote a book dedicated to Ahrar called Tuhfa tul Ahrar. Khwaja Ahrar is also mentioned in Jami's most famous work Yusuf and Zulekha. Khwaja Ahrar is also known to have negotiated peace many times. His spiritual disciples are recorded to have shown extremely high etiquette and morality in his presence.

== Business ==
After returning from Herat, at the age of 29, he completed his training. He bought a piece of cultivable land and began farming. His land produced a great deal of yield very fast. Within a decade, he owned many farming lands, businesses, Turkic baths, khanqahs, and was sending trading caravans to trade with China. Historians contend he had become one of the richest men of Central Asia. He used to spend most of his money on philanthropy. Most of his wealth was invested in Waqf (religious endowments) and was used for the needy.

The height of Khwaja Ahrar's career coincided with the cultural efflorescence of Herat during the reign of Sultan Husayn Bayqara. Many of his enemies accused him of amassing a large amount of wealth. However, he always spent his wealth for the poor. Regardless he became a very rich man owning more 3500 acres of cultivable land at one time. He had many properties, including mosques and madrassas that were waqf.

== Influence on Mughal empire ==
A Timurid prince was the sultan of Samarqand at the time. Khwaja Ahrar met him to discuss the condition of the people. However, the chief aid of the sultan had no interest, so Khwaja Ahrar told him "I have been commanded by God and His messenger to come here". The sultan's aid still did not show any sign of talking and said the sultan was not concerned about the people. At this, the Khwaja wrote the name of the Sultan on the wall, erased it with his saliva, said "God will replace you with a King who is concerned for his people", and left. Some days later, as history records, Sultan Abu Sa'id Mirza, another Timurid King gathered his forces and attacked Samarqand. Sultan Abu Saeed later became the grandfather of Zahiruddin Muhammad Babur, the conqueror of India and founder of the Mughal Empire. This alliance of Abu Sa'id Mirza and Khwaja Ahrar lasted for decades and proved fruitful for the whole kingdom.

Khwaja Ahrar also named Babur in his infancy as Zahiruddin Muhammad, literally 'Defender of Religion'.

== Death ==
Khwaja Ahrar died when he was 89 years old in Samarqand in 1490 (896 Hijri). His chronogram is خلدِ برین which was discovered by Ali Shernawai. He left a huge fortune, and his family continued his preachings. He was buried at a secluded spot in Samarkand, where a madrasa and mosque were built at his grave in the 1630s, now known as the Khoja Ahrar Complex.

== Famous quotes ==
"Everyone enters through a different door; I entered this Spiritual Order through the door of service."

"Love and follow Lovers. Then you will be like them and their love will reflect on you."

"Sufism requires you to carry everyone’s burdens and not to put yours on anyone."
