= Darwish Muhammad =

Indian Sufi philosopher (1443–1562 CE)

Personal life
- Born: 16th Shawwal 846 AH (17/18 February 1443)
- Died: 19th Muḥarram 970H (17 September 1562). Kitab, Uzbekistan
- Main interest(s): Islamic Law, Islamic philosophy

Religious life
- Religion: Islam
- Denomination: Sunni
- Jurisprudence: Hanafi
- Tariqa: Naqshbandi
- Creed: Maturidi

Muslim leader
- Influenced by: Muhammad Zahid Wakhshi
- Influenced: Muhammad Amkanagi

Khwaja Darwish Muhammad (Persian: درویش محمد; 846–971 AH) (1443 − 1562 CE) famous Sufi of Naqshbandī Sufi order .

He was the nephew of Khwaja Muhammad Zahid Wakhshi. Khwaja Darwish Muhammad died on 1562 AD in Kitab, 100 km from Samarkand in the Shakhrisabz region of Uzbekistan. He passed his spiritual order to his son, Khwaja Muhammad Amkanagi. His shrine is located in Kitab, Uzbekistan.

== See also ==
- Ahmad Sirhindi
