= Abu Ali Farmadi =

Muslim saint

Hazrat Khwāja Abu Ali Farmadi
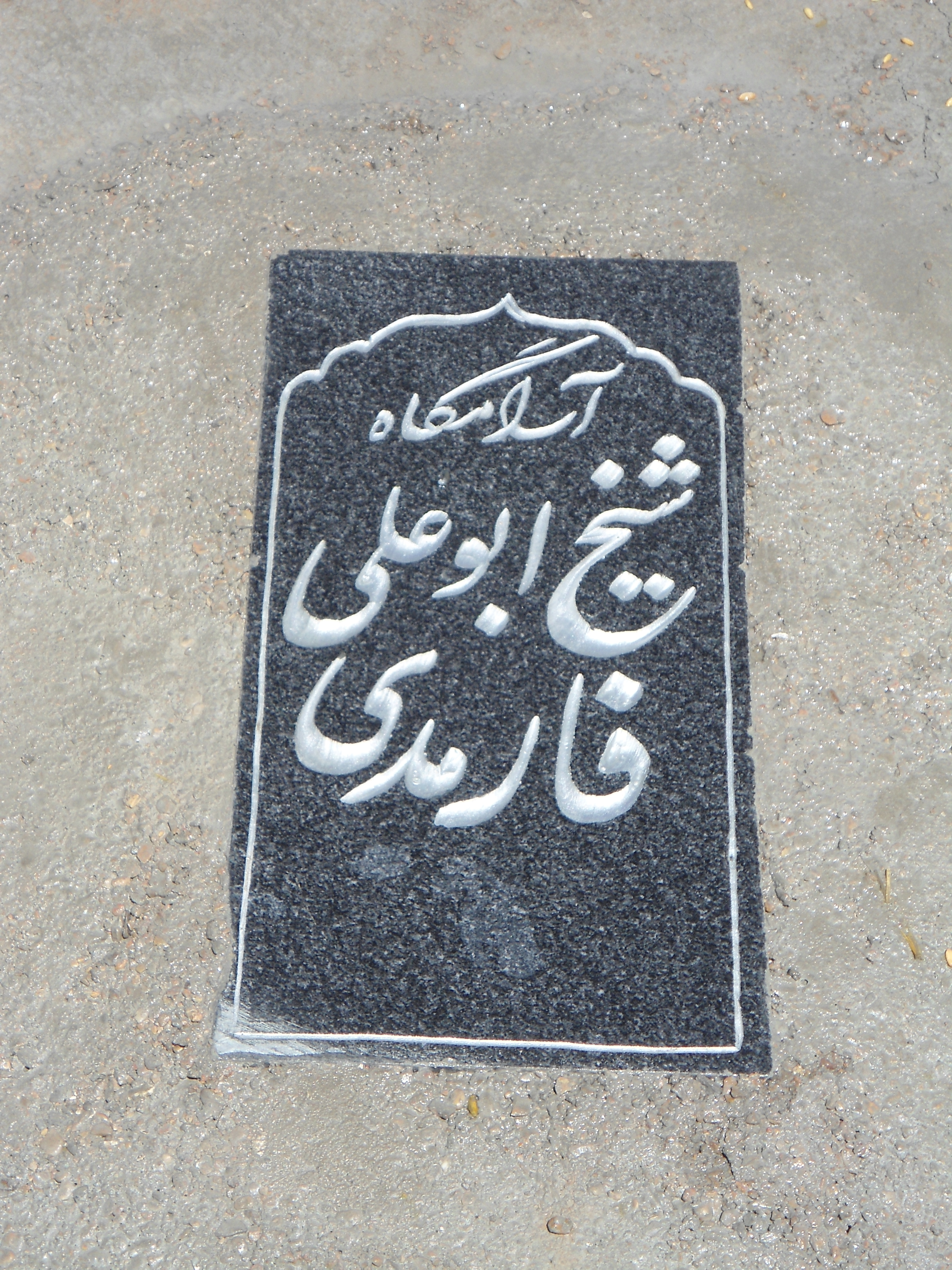
- Shrine of Abu Ali Farmadi
- Born: 1016 AD (407 AH); Farmad, Tus, Iran
- Died: 1084 AD (477 AH) (aged 68)

Philosophical work
- School: Islamic philosophy
- Main interests: Implementation of Islamic Law, Islamic Statehood
- Notable ideas: Evolution of Islamic philosophy, Application of Sharia

Fazal bin Muhammad bin Ali (Arabic: فضل بن محمد بن علي,; born 1016 - 1084) commonly known as "Abu Ali Farmadi" or just "Abu Ali" was a saint of the Naqshbandi Golden Chain, and a prominent Sufi master and preacher from Ṭūs, Khorasan Iran. He is well known for being a teacher of Al-Ghazali during his youth.

== Birth ==
He was born in the year 407 AH. He was called al-Fārmadī on account of his place of birth, Fārmad, a village in the vicinity of Ṭūs.

== Education ==
After completing his elementary education he entered the madrasah of the famous Sufi Abdulkarim Qushayri in Nishapur and then he was a follower of Abu Al-Hassan Al-Kharqani. He was the disciple of Imam Abu Qasim Qaisheri and Sheikh Abu Qasim Jurjani. In his last days he got spiritual favours from Sheikh Abdul Hasan Qarqani.

== Biography ==
Abu ali Farmadi is called the Knower of the Merciful and the Custodian of Divine Love. He was a scholar of the Shafi’i school of jurisprudence and a unique `arif (endowed with spiritual knowledge). He was deeply involved in both the School of the Salaf (scholars of the first and second centuries AH) and that of the Khalaf (later scholars), but he made his mark in the Science of Tasawwuf. From it he extracted some of the heavenly knowledge which is mentioned in the Qur’an in reference to al-Khidr salla: “and We have taught him from our Heavenly Knowledge” [18:65].

== Death ==
He died on 4 Rabi-Ul-Awwal 477 AH on Thursday.
