= Baha' al-Din Naqshband =

Muslim preacher, mystic and theologian (1318–1389)

Baha' al-Din Muhammad Naqshband بهاءالدین محمد نقشبند
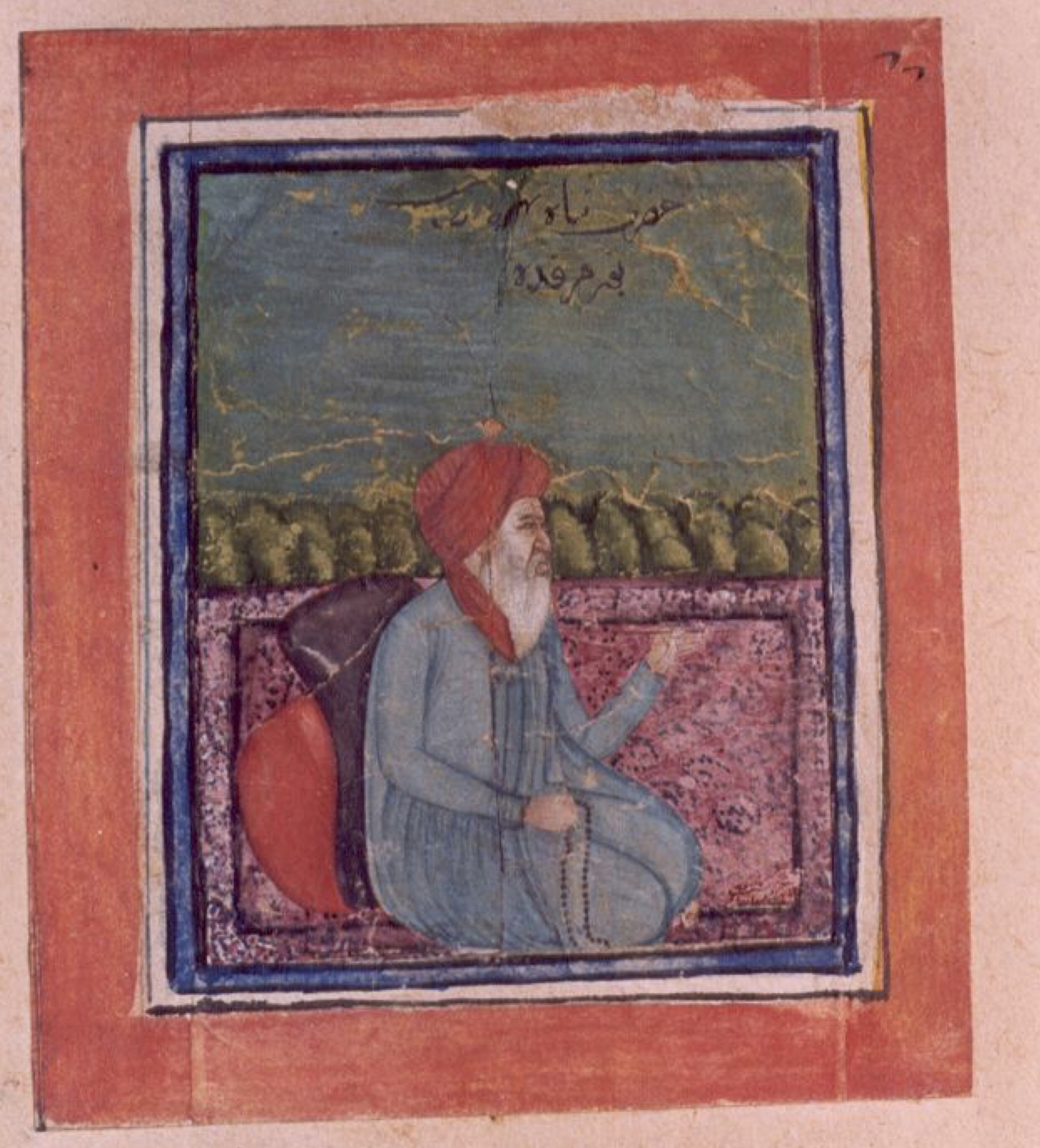
- Painting of Hazrat Shah Bahauddin, from a manuscript in the collection of Rampur Raza Library

Personal life
- Born: March 1318 CE Qasr-i Hinduvan, Chagatai Khanate (present-day Uzbekistan)
- Died: 2 March 1389 CE Bukhara, Timurid Empire (present-day Uzbekistan)
- Resting place: Bahoutdin Architectural Complex, Uzbekistan
- Home town: Kasri Orifon (present-day Uzbekistan)
- Main interest: Sufism
- Known for: Founder of the Naqshbandi Sufi Order

Religious life
- Religion: Sunni Islam
- Denomination: Sunni
- Order: Sufi
- Jurisprudence: Hanafi
- Tariqa: Naqshbandi (founder)
- Creed: Maturidi

Senior posting
- Successor: Sayyid Alauddin Attar
- Disciple of: Amir Kulal
- Disciples: Sayyid Alauddin Attar

Baha' al-Din Muhammad Naqshband (Persian: بهاءالدین محمد نقشبند; 1318–1389) was the eponymous founder of what became one of the largest Sufi Sunni orders, the Naqshbandi.

== Early life ==
Baha al-Din was born in March 1318 in the village of Qasr-i Hinduvan, near Bukhara. Like the majority of the region's sedentary population, Baha al-Din was a speaker of Persian and a participant in its culture. According to H. Algar in Encyclopædia Iranica, the texts that claim Baha al-Din was descended from the Islamic prophet Muhammad through Ja'far al-Sadiq (died 765), should be "treated with reserve". Early texts do not mention Baha al-Din's supposed ancestry to Muhammad, but they do imply that his teacher Amir Kulal (died 1370) was a descendant of Muhammad through Ja'far al-Sadiq, which may suggest that their genealogies were later conflated. However, Annemarie Schimmel highlights the descent of Bahauddin from Hasan al-Askari, referring to Khwaja Mir Dard's family and "many nobles, from Bukhara; they led their pedigree back to Baha al-Din Naqshband, after whom the Naqshbandi order is named, and who was a descendant, in the 13th generation of the 11th imam al-Hasan al-Askari".

Three days after his birth, Baha al-Din was adopted as a spiritual son by Baba Mohammad Sammasi, a master of the Khwajagan, a Sufi order founded by Yusuf Hamadani (died 1140). Baha al-Din's paternal grandfather brought him to Sammasi, where he was the latter's murid (novice). Sammasi later entrusted Baha al-Din's training to his distinguished student Amir Kulal.

== Career ==
Early texts do not mention how Baha al-Din gained the nickname "Naqshband", nor its meaning. An agreement was later partly reached that it referred to the naqsh (imprint) of the name of Allah that is embedded in the heart through constant prayer. In Bukhara, Baha al-Din became its patron saint and was commonly referred to as "Khwaja Bala-gardan" by its inhabitants.

Some historians agree that the original Naqshbandi had a particularly Iranian or Khurasanian attitude, which according to Encyclopædia Iranica is supported by the fact that Baha al-Din was surrounded by a company of urban dwellers who mostly spoke Tajik. However, the Naqshbandi had been influenced by Turkic Sufi order, the Yasawiyya. Three generations after Baha al-Din's death, the Naqshbandi started receiving support among the Turkic inhabitants of Central Asia, thus displaying an all-inclusive appeal.

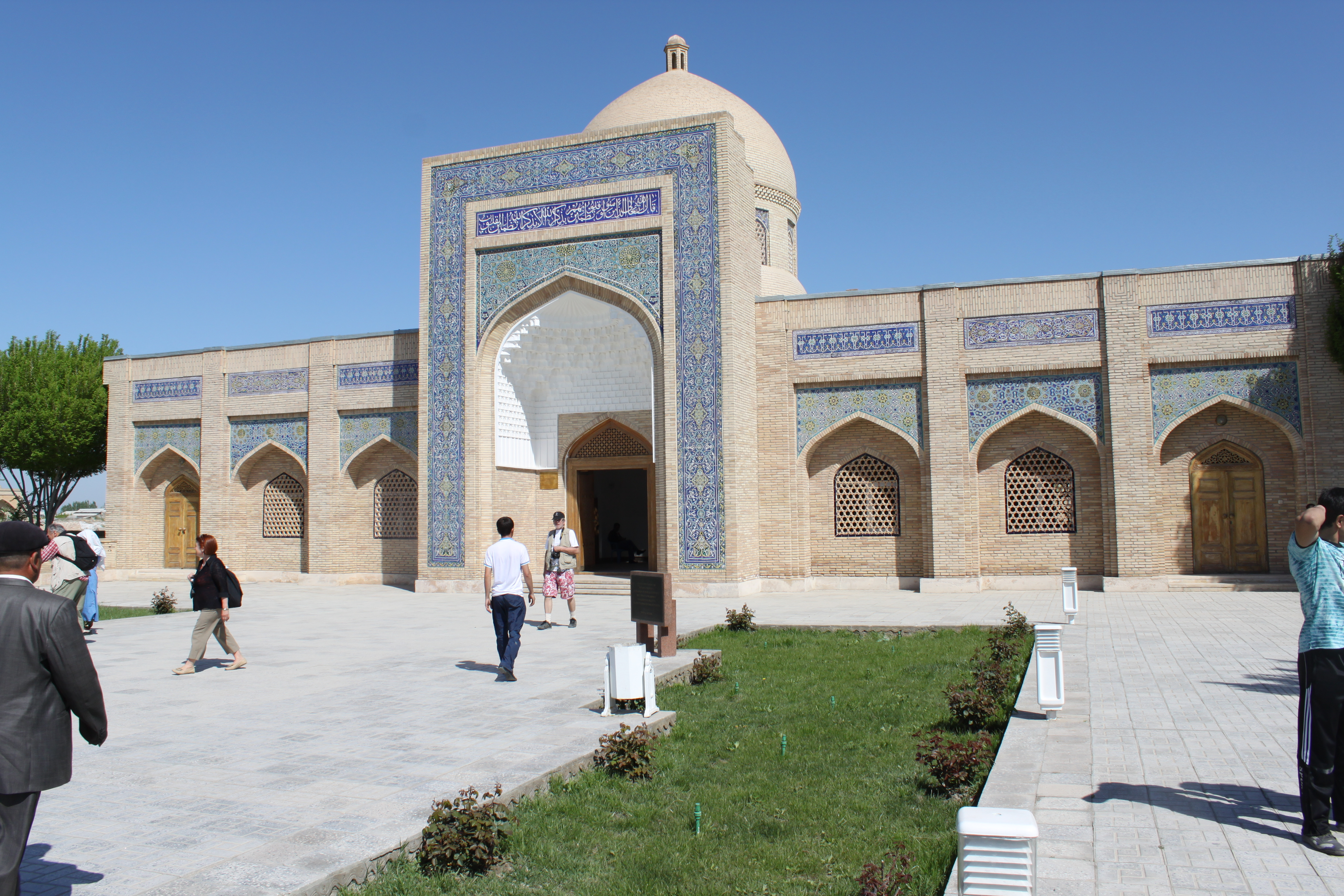
The mausoleum of Baha al-Din Naqshband in Bukhara, present-day Uzbekistan

Baha al-Din died on 2 March 1389 in Qasr-i Hinduvan, which was later renamed Qasr-i Arifan out of respect to him.

== Sources ==
- Algar, H. (1988a). "Bahāʾ-al-Dīn Naqšband". Encyclopædia Iranica, online edition, Vol. III, Fasc. 4. New York. pp. 433–435.
- Algar, H. (1988b). "Bābā Sammāsī". Encyclopædia Iranica, online edition, Vol. III, Fasc. 3. New York. pp. 294–295.
- Soucek, Svat (2000). A History of Inner Asia. Cambridge University Press. ISBN 978-0521657044.
- Schimmel, Annemarie (1976). Pain and Grace: A Study of Two Mystical Writers of Eighteenth-Century Muslim India. Brill. ISBN 978-90-04-04771-6.
