= Yaqub al-Charkhi =

Sufi master and Islamic scholar

- Born: 1360; Logar, Afghanistan
- Died: 1447 (aged 86–87); Dushanbe, Tajikistan
- Predecessor: Sayyid Alauddin Atar
- Successor: Khwaja Ahrar

Yaʿqūb ibn ʿUthmān ibn Maḥmūd al-Charkhī (Persian: یعقوب بن عثمان بن محمود چرخی) was a Naqshbandi Sufi pir and student of Khwaja Sayyid Alauddin Atar. Yaqub Charkhi was born in 762, in a village called Charkh in Logar, Afghanistan AH and died in 851. He was a Sufi master and also a reputed Islamic scholar.

He was born around 762 AH (1360/61) and died on Saturday 5 Safar 851 AH (22 April 1447). His shrine, according to some research scholars, lies 5 kilometres West of Dushanbe the capital of Tajikistan. Yaqub al-Charkhi was teacher of famous Sufi Khwaja Ahrar
