= Naqshbandi Tahiri Golden Chain =

Naqshbandi Tahiri Golden Chain is the spiritual chain of successors of the Naqshbandi Sufi order which descends from Khwaja Muhammad Tahir Bakhshi Naqshbandi commonly known as Sajjan Saeen. The recitation of this golden chain in poetic form is part of the daily practices of a follower in the Naqshbandi Tahiri Sufi order.

== The Golden Chain ==
#	Name	Buried	Birth	Death
1	Muhammad	Medina, Saudi Arabia	Mon 12 Rabi al-Awwal (570/571 CE)	14 Rabi al-Akhir 11 AH (5/6 July 632 CE)
2	Sayyadna Abu Bakr Siddiq	Medina, Saudi Arabia		22 Jumada al-Thani 13 AH (22 August 634 C.E)
3	Sayyadna Salman al-Farsi	Mada'in, Iraq		10 Rajab 33 AH (4/5 February 654 C.E)
4	Imām Qasim ibn Muhammad ibn Abi Bakr, son of son of (2)	Medina, Saudi Arabia	23 Shaban 24 AH (22/23 June 645 C.E)	24 Jumada al-Thani 101/106/107 AH
5	Imām Jafar Sadiq, son of granddaughter of (2)	Medina, Saudi Arabia	8 Ramadan 80 AH (5/6 November 699 C.E)	15 Rajab 148 AH (6/7 September 765 C.E)
6	Khwaja Bayazid Bastami	Bistam, Semnan province, Iran	186 AH (804 C.E)	15 Shaban 261 AH (24/25 May 875 C.E)
7	Khwaja Abul-Hassan Kharaqani	Kharaqan, near Bistam, Semnan province, Iran	352 AH (963 C.E)	10 Muharram 425 AH (5/6 December 1033 C.E)
8	Khwaja Abul Qasim Gurgani	Gurgan, Iran		23 Safar 450 AH (19/20 April 1058 C.E)
9	Khwaja Abu ali Farmadi	Toos, Khurasan, Iran	434 AH (1042/1043 C.E)	4 Rabi al-Awwal 477 or 511 AH (10 July 1084 / 6 July 1117)
10	Khwaja Abu Yaqub Yusuf Hamadānī	Merv, near Mary, Turkmenistan	440 AH (1048/1049 C.E)	Rajab 535 AH (Feb/Mar 1141 C.E)
11	Khwaja Abdul Khaliq Ghujdawani	Ghajdawan, Bukhara, Uzbekistan	22 Shaban 435 AH (24/25 March 1044 C.E)	12 Rabi al-Awwal 575 AH (17/18 August 1179 C.E)
12	Khwaja Arif Riwgari	Reogar, near Bukhara, Uzbekistan	27 Rajab 551 AH (15 September 1156 C.E)	1 Shawwal 616 AH (10/11 December 1219 C.E.)
13	Khwaja Mahmood Anjir-Faghnawi	Bukhara, Uzbekistan	18 Shawwal 628 AH (18/19 August 1231 C.E)	17 Rabi al-Awwal 717 AH (29/30 May 1317 C.E)
14	Khwaja Azizan Ali Ramitani	Khwaarizm, Uzbekistan	591 AH (1194 C.E)	27 Ramadan 715 or 721 AH (25/26 December 1315 or 20/21 October 1321)
15	Mohammad Baba As-Samasi	Samaas, Bukhara, Uzbekistan	25 Rajab 591 AH (5/6 July 1195 C.E)	10 Jumada al-Thani 755 AH (2/3 July 1354 C.E)
16	Khwaja Sayyid Amir Kulal	Saukhaar, Bukhara, Uzbekistan	676 AH (1277/1278 C.E)	Wed 2 Jumada al-Thani 772 AH (21/22 December 1370 C.E)
17	Khwaja Muhammad Baha'uddin Naqshband Bukhari	Qasr-e-Aarifan, Bukhara, Uzbekistan	4 Muharram 718 AH (8/9 March 1318 C.E)	3 Rabi al-Awwal 791 AH (2/3 March 1389 C.E)
18	Khwaja Ala'uddin Attar Bukhari, son-in-law of (17)	Jafaaniyan, Transoxiana (Uzbekistan)		Wed 20 Rajab 804 AH (23 February 1402 C.E)
19	Khwaja Yaqub Charkhi	Gulistan, Dushanbe, Tajikistan	762 AH (1360/1361 C.E)	5 Safar 851 AH (21/22 April 1447 C.E)
20	Khwaja Ubaidullah Ahrar	Samarkand, Uzbekistan	Ramadan 806 AH (March/April 1404 C.E)	29 Rabi al-Awwal 895 AH (19/20 February 1490 C.E)
21	Khwaja Muhammad Zahid Vakhshi	Vakhsh, Tajikistan	14 Shawwal 852 AH (11/12 December 1448 C.E)	1 Rabi al-Awwal 936 AH (3/4 November 1529 C.E)
22	Khwaja Darwish Muhammad, son of sister of (21)	Asqarar, Uzbekistan	16 Shawwal 846 AH (17/18 February 1443 C.E)	19 Muharram 970 AH (18/19 September 1562 C.E)
23	Khwaja Muhammad Amkanagi, son of (22)	Amkana, Bukhara, Uzbekistan	918 AH (1512/1513 C.E)	22 Shaban 1008 AH (8/9 March 1600 C.E)
24	Khwaja Muhammad Baqi Billah Berang	Delhi, India	5 Dhu al-Hijjah 971 or 972 AH (14 July 1564 / 3 July 1565)	25 Jumada al-Thani 1012 AH (29/30 November 1603 C.E)
25	Shaikh Ahmad al-Farūqī al-Sirhindī, Imām Rabbānī	Sirhind, India	14 Shawwal 971 AH (25/26 May 1564 C.E)	28 Safar 1034 AH (9/10 December 1624 C.E)
26	Imām Khwaja Muhammad Masum Faruqi, 3rd son of (25)	Sirhind, India	1007 AH (1598/1599 C.E)	9 Rabi al-Awwal 1099 AH (13/14 January 1688 C.E)
27	Khwaja Muhammad Saifuddin Faruqi, son of (26)	Sirhind, India	1049 AH (1639/1640 C.E)	19 or 26 Jumada al-awwal 1096 AH (April 1685 C.E)
28	Hafiz Muhammad Mohsin Dehlavi	Delhi, India		
29	Sayyid Nur Muhammad Badayuni	Delhi, India		11 Dhu al-Qi'dah 1135AH (12/13 August 1723 C.E)
30	Shaheed Mirza Mazhar Jan-e-Janaan, Shams-ud-Dīn Habībullāh	Delhi, India	11 Ramadan 1111 AH (2/3 March 1700 C.E)	10 Muharram 1195 AH (Fri 5 January 1781 C.E)
31	Khwaja Abdullah Dehlavi, alias Shah Ghulam Ali Dehlavi	Delhi, India	1156 AH (1743 C.E)	22 Safar 1240 AH (15/16 October 1824 C.E)
32	Hāfīz Abu Sā‘īd Fāruqī Mujaddidī	Delhi, India	2 Dhu al-Qi'dah 1196 AH (9/10 October 1782 C.E)	1 Shawwal 1250 AH (30/31 January 1835 C.E)
33	Khwaja Shah Ahmed Sā‘īd Fāruqī Mujaddidī, son of Hāfīz Abu Sā‘īd Fāruqī	Medina, Saudi Arabia		2 Rabi al-Awwal 1277 AH (18/19 September 1860 C.E)
34	Khwaja Haji Dost Muhammad Qandhari	Mussa Zai Sharif, Dera Ismail Khan, Pakistan	1216 AH (1801/1802 C.E)	22 Shawwal 1284 AH (16/17 February 1868 C.E)
35	Khwaja Muhammad Usman Damani	Mussa Zai Sharif, Dera Ismail Khan, Pakistan	1244 AH (1828/1829 C.E)	22 Shaban 1314 AH (26/27 January 1897 C.E)
36	Sayyad Laal Shah Hamdani (Not included in Naqshbandi Ghafori Golden Chain)	Danda Shah Bilawal, district Chakwal, Pakistan		27 Shaban 1313 AH (11/12 February 1896 C.E)
37	Khwaja Muhammad Sirajuddin, son of (35)	Mussa Zai Sharif, Dera Ismail Khan, Pakistan	15 Muharram 1297 AH (29/30 December 1879 C.E)	26 Rabi al-Awwal 1333 AH (11/12 February 1915 C.E)
38	Pir Muhammad Fazal Ali Shah Qureshi	Miskeenpur, district Muzaffargarh, Punjab, Pakistan	1270 AH (1853/1854 C.E)	1 Ramadan 1354 AH 28 November 1935
39	Khwaja Abdul Ghaffar Naqshbandi, alias Pir Mitha	Rahmatpur, Larkana, Pakistan	1880 C.E. (1297 A.H)	12 December 1964 8 Shaban 1384 AH
40	Khwaja Allah Bakhsh Abbasi Ghaffari alias Sohna Saeen	Allahabad, Kandiaro, Sindh, Pakistan	10 March 1910 (27/28 Safar 1328 AH)	12 December 1983 6 Rabi al-Awwal 1404 AH
41	Khwaja Muhammad Tahir Abbasi Bakhshi, alias Sajjan Saeen, son of (40)	Born at Rahmatpur, Larkana, Pakistan Residing at Allahabad, Kandiaro, Sindh, Pakistan	21 March 1963 (24/25 Shawwal 1382 AH)	

== Notes ==
- Sayyad Laal Shah Hamdani (36) and Khwaja Sirajuddin Naqshbandi (37) were both Khulafa of Khwaja Muhammad Usman Damani (35). Pir Fazal Ali Qureshi (38) first received khilafat from Sayyad Laal Shah Hamdani (36) and then from Khwaja Sirajuddin Naqshbandi (37). Some other spiritual chains do not mention Sayyad Laal Shah Hamdani as he is not a shaykh of Khwaja Sirajuddin Naqshbandi.
- Similarly, Hafiz Abu Saeed (32) and Shah Ahmed Saeed (33) who was his son, both received Khilafat from Shah Ghulam Ali Dehlavi (31). But since Hafiz Abu Saeed (32) succeeded Shah Ghulam Ali first, and then was followed by Shah Ahmed Saeed, both names are mentioned in the chain.
- Khwaja Ala'uddin Attar (18) and Khwaja Yaqub Charkhi (19) both received Khilafat from Shah Baha'uddin Naqshband (17). But since Khwaja Yaqub Charkhi also received spiritual training from Khwaja Ala'uddin, his name comes after Khwaja Ala'uddin.

== See also ==
- Silsila
- Hadith of Golden Chain
- Naqshbandi-Haqqani Golden Chain
