= Süleymancılar =

Sufi mystic order in Sunni Islam

The Süleymancılar or Sülaymanlilar is a Sunni Muslim Movement focusing on Quran Education globally, based in Turkey. It takes its name from Süleyman Hilmi Tunahan who started Quranic Education in Turkey despite secularist bans in 1930's. In the early 1990s it was estimated that there were over two million members in Turkey. There are also several sub-orders of the Süleymancılar in Germany and United States.

== Süleymancılar Silsila ==
The Süleymancılar Silsila or chain of succession is as follows:

#	Name	Buried	Birth	Death
1	Sayyiduna Muhammad	Madinah, Saudi Arabia	Mon 12 Rabi I (570/571 CE)	12 Rabi I 11 AH (5/6 June 632 CE)
2	Sayyiduna Abu Bakr Siddiq	Madinah, Saudi Arabia		22 Jumada II 13 AH (22 August 634 CE)
3	Sayyiduna Salman al-Farsi	Mada'in, Iraq		10 Rajab 33 AH (4/5 February 654 CE)
4	Imām Qasim ibn Muhammad ibn Abi Bakr	Madinah, Saudi Arabia	23 Sha'ban 24 AH (22/23 June 645 CE)	24 Jumada II 101/106/107 AH
5	Imām Jafar Sadiq	Madinah, Saudi Arabia	8 Ramadan 80 AH (5/6 November 699 CE)	15 Rajab 148 AH (6/7 September 765 CE)
6	Khwaja Bayazid Bastami	Bistam, Semnan province, Iran	186 AH (804 CE)	15 Sha'ban 261 AH (24/25 May 875 CE)
7	Khwaja Abul-Hassan Kharaqani	Kharaqan, near Bistam, Semnan province, Iran	352 AH (963 CE)	10 Muharram 425 AH
8	Khwaja Abu al-Qasim Gurgani	Gorgan, Golestan, Iran	380 AH (990 CE)	450 AH (1058 CE) (5/6 December 1033 CE)
9	Khwaja Abu Ali Farmadi	Toos, Khurasan, Iran	434 AH (1042/1043 CE)	4 Rabi I 477 or 511 AH (10 July 1084 / 6 July 1117)
10	Khwaja Abu Yaqub Yusuf Hamadānī	Marv, near Mary, Turkmenistan	440 AH (1048/1049 CE)	Rajab 535 AH (Feb/Mar 1141 CE)
11	Khwaja Abdul Khaliq Ghujdawani	Ghajdawan, Bukhara, Uzbekistan	22 Sha'ban 435 AH (24/25 March 1044 CE)	12 Rabi I 575 AH (17/18 August 1179 CE)
12	Khwaja Arif Riwgari	Reogar, near Bukhara, Uzbekistan	27 Rajab 551 AH (15 September 1156 CE)	1 Shawwal 616 AH (10/11 December 1219 C.E.)
13	Khwaja Mahmood Anjir-Faghnawi	Bukhara, Uzbekistan	18 Shawwal 628 AH (18/19 August 1231 CE)	17 Rabi I 717 AH (29/30 May 1317 CE)
14	Khwaja Azizan Ali Ramitani	Khwaarizm, Uzbekistan	591 AH (1194 CE)	27 Ramadan 715 or 721 AH (25/26 December 1315 or 20/21 October 1321)
15	Khwaja Mohammad Baba As-Samasi	Samaas, Bukhara, Uzbekistan	25 Rajab 591 AH (5/6 July 1195 CE)	10 Jumada II 755 AH (2/3 July 1354 CE)
16	Khwaja Sayyid Amir Kulal	Saukhar, Bukhara, Uzbekistan	676 AH (1277/1278 CE)	Wed 2 Jumada II 772 AH (21/22 December 1370 CE)
17	Khwaja Muhammad Baha'uddin Naqshband Bukhari	Qasr-e-Arifan, Bukhara, Uzbekistan	4 Muharram 718 AH (8/9 March 1318 CE)	3 Rabi I 791 AH (2/3 March 1389 CE)
18	Khwaja Ala'uddin Attar Bukhari	Jafaniyan, Transoxiana,Uzbekistan		Wed 20 Rajab 804 AH (23 February 1402 CE)
19	Khwaja Yaqub Charkhi	Gulistan, Dushanbe, Tajikistan	762 AH (1360/1361 CE)	5 Safar 851 AH (21/22 April 1447 CE)
20	Khwaja Ubaidullah Ahrar	Samarkand, Uzbekistan	Ramadan 806 AH (March/April 1404 CE)	29 Rabi I 895 AH (19/20 February 1490 CE)
21	Khwaja Muhammad Zahid Wakhshi	Wakhsh	14 Shawwal 852 AH (11/12 December 1448 CE)	1 Rabi I 936 AH (3/4 November 1529 CE)
22	Khwaja Durwesh Muhammad	Asqarar, Uzbekistan	16 Shawwal 846 AH (17/18 February 1443 CE)	19 Muharram 970 AH (18/19 September 1562 CE)
23	Khwaja Muhammad Amkanaki	Amkana, Bukhara, Uzbekistan	918 AH (1512/1513 CE)	22 Sha'ban 1008 AH (8/9 March 1600 CE)
24	Khwaja Muhammad Baqi Billah Berang	Delhi, India	5 Dhu'l-Hijja 971 or 972 AH (14 July 1564 / 3 July 1565)	25 Jumada II 1012 AH (29/30 November 1603 CE)
25	Shaikh Ahmad al-Fārūqī al-Sirhindī, Imām Rabbānī	Sirhind, India	14 Shawwal 971 AH (25/26 May 1564 CE)	28 Safar 1034 AH (9/10 December 1624 CE)
26	Imām Khwaja Muhammad Masum Fārūqī	Sirhind, India	1007 AH (1598/1599 CE)	9 Rabi I 1099 AH (13/14 January 1688 CE)
27	Khwaja Muhammad Saif ud-Dīn Fārūqī	Sirhind, India	1049 AH (1639/1640 CE)	19 or 26 Jumada I 1096 AH (April 1685 CE)
28	Sayyid Nur Muhammad Badayuni	Delhi, India		11 Dhu'l-Qa'da 1135AH (12/13 August 1723 CE)
29	Shaheed Mirza Mazhar Jan-e-Janaan, Shams-ud-Dīn Habībullāh	Delhi, India	11 Ramadan 1111 AH (2/3 March 1700 CE)	10 Muharram 1195 AH (Fri 5 January 1781 CE)
30	Khwaja Abdullah Dehlavi, alias Shah Ghulam Ali Dehlavi	Delhi, India	1156 AH (1743 CE)	22 Safar 1240 AH (15/16 October 1824 CE)
31	Hāfīz Abu Sā‘īd Fāruqī Mujaddidī	Delhi, India	2 Dhu'l-Qa'da 1196 AH (9/10 October 1782 CE)	1 Shawwal 1250 AH (30/31 January 1835 CE)
32	Khwaja Shah Ahmed Sā‘īd Fāruqī Mujaddidi ibn Hāfīz Abu Sā‘īd Fāruqī	Madinah, Saudi Arabia		2 Rabi I 1277 AH (18/19 September 1860 CE)
33	Khwaja Muhammed Mazhar İş’an Can-ı Cânân ibn Khwaja Ahmed Sā‘īd Fāruqī	India	1248 AH (1832 CE)	Madina (1883 CE)
34	Khwaja Selahüddin İbn-i Mevlana Siracüddin	Osh - Kyrgyzstan	(1843 CE)	Osh - Kyrgyzstan (13 November 1910, CE)
35	Süleyman Hilmi Tunahan	Istanbul, Turkey	(1888 CE)	(September 16, 1959 CE)
