= Süleyman Hilmi Tunahan =

Turkish Islamic scholar (1888–1959)

Süleyman Hilmi Tunahan (1888, Silistre, Bulgaria – 16 September 1959; Kısıklı, Üsküdar, Istanbul) was the founder of the Süleymancılar Sufi order, a Turkish Islamic scholar, and mystic.

== Biography ==
Süleyman Hilmi Tunahan was a distinguished figure in Islam, known for his guidance and courage. He dedicated his entire life, which spanned seventy-one years from 1888 to 1959, to the service of Islam. His grandfather was Hafız Kaymak, and his family traced its lineage back to his great-grandfather İdris Bey, who was allegedly a descendant of Muhammad. Upon finding İdris Bey, he married him to his sister and appointed him as a khan, or prince, over the Tuna (Danube) region. Thus, İdris Bey's title became Tunahan, and he was tasked with collecting taxes. İdris held this position, passing it down to his grandchildren until Osman Bey, the father of Süleyman Efendi, came. All of them were scholars. Osman Efendi married and had four sons: Fehmi, İbrahim, Halil, and Süleyman.

Süleyman was born in the village of Ferhatler in Silistra, Bulgaria, in 1888. He attended Satırlı School with his brothers, where his father was a teacher. Distinguished by his brilliance from a young age, Süleyman completed his primary and secondary education at Silistra School before being sent to Istanbul by his father to continue his studies. His father gave him three pieces of advice:

1. To be economical and not waste money
2. To strive to master the science of principles

He joined the Fatih School and lived in a basement with no light or windows. He studied under Sheikh Ahmed Efendi of Bafra, who greatly admired him. Süleyman Hilmi's extreme intelligence and love of study were so evident that the Sheikh wanted to marry him to his daughter, but she died in an accident. Subsequently, Süleyman married a righteous woman named Hatice. After graduating, he joined the Dârü'l-hilâfeti'l-aliyye Madrasa in 1913. He excelled among the top students, passed the judicial exam, and ranked first. He was appointed as a judge in Kastamonu, but his father sent him a letter saying, "O Süleyman, know that I did not send you to Istanbul to be in Hell." Here, his father reminded him of the hadith of Muhammad, "Two judges in Hell and one judge in Paradise" - narrated by Abu Dawood, Al-Tirmidhi, and Ibn Majah. His father was pleased to learn that Süleyman did not want to continue in the position of judge. Süleyman was so dedicated to knowledge that he would resist sleep until his eyes bled and would drink coffee to stay awake. In winter, he would place ice between his shirt and his back to keep himself alert.

He graduated from the Süleymaniye School in Istanbul, with a focus on Interpretation and Hadith, in 1919. He also obtained a judge's certificate and became a public teacher. Additionally, he studied Roman law, maritime law, commercial law, and comparative international law alongside Islamic law at Süleymaniye College. He began teaching in 1921, but his teaching career was cut short by the closure of religious schools under the law issued during Atatürk's rule in 1924. His generosity was such that he fed the policemen who came to arrest him, and some of them became his students. He was also very kind to his students, often taking them to the doctor if they fell ill, and he enjoyed telling dignified jokes to his students and family.

The Ottoman coup occurred in 1909 while he was still a student. He opposed the coup. In just five years, significant events unfolded, including the formation of the Grand National Assembly, the abolition of the Sultanate, the end of the Ottoman Empire, the exile of Sultan Mehmed Vahideddin, the declaration of the Republic, and the implementation of the Schools Unification Law.

The closure of 520 religious schools necessitated finding alternative jobs such as imams or preachers or referring teachers to retirement. Süleyman continued his Islamic and educational services, preaching in numerous mosques in Istanbul, including Sultan Ahmed, Süleymaniye, the New Mosque, Şehrazadebaşı, and Kasım Pasha. He taught his students secretly to avoid government persecution following the unification law, enduring many hardships to provide education. He once remarked to his students, "I taught you and moved you from place to place like a cat moving her kittens." He rented the Kapakça farm, hiding his students in workers' clothes to cultivate land by day and study by night. When the police discovered their secret, they would flee to a new location. The students, in turn, opened Quranic schools wherever they went, spreading Islamic education throughout the country.

During the Republican era, Turkey saw several measures by Atatürk to eradicate Islamic influences and Ottoman ancien régime in an attempt to separate religion from the state. On March 3, 1924, a law was enacted to transfer all educational institutions affiliated with various ministries to the Ministry of National Education, known as the Schools Unification Law, which centralized scientific control. Süleyman Hilmi opposed this law, as it led to the closure of 465 religious schools and 29 imam and preacher schools, with severe penalties for religious education.

Süleyman Hilmi was first arrested in 1939 when the police took him from his home, detained him for three days, tortured him, and dismissed him from preaching. In prison, he endured various forms of torture, including being prevented from sleeping and having his cell sprayed with water, which caused him rheumatism. In 1936, the police learned he had rented Halid Pasha farm for teaching, so he fled to the top of Kuşkaya Mountain in the Istranca Mountains, but was caught and arrested.

== Süleymanite schools ==
In 1949, the government reopened religious schools due to pressure from Muslims. Süleyman Hilmi's dream came true, and official education resumed in these schools. The first Quran memorization school affiliated with Süleyman Hilmi opened in 1951 unofficially, with the official opening in 1952. Süleyman Hilmi was eager to open schools in Anatolia and would prostrate in thanks to God upon learning of new school openings. During this time, the Presidency of Religious Affairs held preaching and fatwa competitions, where Süleyman's students consistently excelled, prompting the President of Religious Affairs and senior officials to visit him. Süleyman's students attained prominent religious positions in the country, including Hosni Yilmaz, who became the Mufti of Balikesir at eighteen. The teaching method in Süleyman Hilmi's schools was notably effective, allowing students to master Quranic sciences in a short time. Süleyman's approach involved active student participation, where students read the lesson themselves, and the teacher completed the missing parts, fostering confidence and reinforcing the subject. His teaching was so consuming that he wrote only one book titled "A New Arrangement and Modern Method for Teaching Reading the Letters and Vowels of the Holy Quran."

== Later life and death ==
Despite suffering from diabetes, Süleyman Hilmi Tunahan continued to serve his students, traveling daily using four different means of transportation to teach them while constantly evading the police. His life was marked by a relentless commitment to preserving the Islamic identity in Turkey, and he continued his work until he died on September 16, 1959, during the sunset prayer.

== Silsila ==
The Sheikh Süleyman's Silsila or chain of succession is as follows:

#	Name	Buried	Birth	Death
1	Sayyiduna Muhammad	Madinah, Saudi Arabia	Mon 12 Rabi al-Awwal (570/571 CE)	12 Rabi al-Awwal 11 AH (5/6 June 632 CE)
2	Sayyiduna Abu Bakr Siddiq	Madinah, Saudi Arabia		22 Jumada al-Thani 13 AH (22 August 634 CE)
3	Sayyiduna Salman al-Farsi	Mada'in, Iraq		10 Rajab 33 AH (4/5 February 654 CE)
4	Imām Qasim ibn Muhammad ibn Abi Bakr	Madinah, Saudi Arabia	23 Shaban 24 AH (22/23 June 645 CE)	24 Jumada al-Thani 101/106/107 AH
5	Imām Jafar Sadiq	Madinah, Saudi Arabia	8 Ramadan 80 AH (5/6 November 699 CE)	15 Rajab 148 AH (6/7 September 765 CE)
6	Khwaja Bayazid Bastami	Bistam, Semnan province, Iran	186 AH (804 CE)	15 Shaban 261 AH (24/25 May 875 CE)
7	Khwaja Abul-Hassan Kharaqani	Kharaqan, near Bistam, Semnan province, Iran	352 AH (963 CE)	10 Muharram 425 AH
9	Khwaja Abu Ali Farmadi	Toos, Khurasan, Iran	434 AH (1042/1043 CE)	4 Rabi al-Awwal 477 or 511 AH (10 July 1084 / 6 July 1117)
10	Khwaja Abu Yaqub Yusuf Hamadānī	Marv, near Mary, Turkmenistan	440 AH (1048/1049 CE)	Rajab 535 AH (Feb/Mar 1141 CE)
11	Khwaja Abdul Khaliq Ghujdawani	Ghajdawan, Bukhara, Uzbekistan	22 Shaban 435 AH (24/25 March 1044 CE)	12 Rabi al-Awwal 575 AH (17/18 August 1179 CE)
12	Khwaja Arif Riwgari	Reogar, near Bukhara, Uzbekistan	27 Rajab 551 AH (15 September 1156 CE)	1 Shawwal 616 AH (10/11 December 1219 CE)
13	Khwaja Mahmood Anjir-Faghnawi	Bukhara, Uzbekistan	18 Shawwal 628 AH (18/19 August 1231 CE)	17 Rabi al-Awwal 717 AH (29/30 May 1317 CE)
14	Khwaja Azizan Ali Ramitani	Khwaarizm, Uzbekistan	591 AH (1194 CE)	27 Ramadan 715 or 721 AH (25/26 December 1315 or 20/21 October 1321)
15	Khwaja Mohammad Baba As-Samasi	Samaas, Bukhara, Uzbekistan	25 Rajab 591 AH (5/6 July 1195 CE)	10 Jumada al-Thani 755 AH (2/3 July 1354 CE)
16	Khwaja Sayyid Amir Kulal	Saukhaar, Bukhara, Uzbekistan	676 AH (1277/1278 CE)	Wed 2 Jumada al-Thani 772 AH (21/22 December 1370 CE)
17	Khwaja Muhammad Baha'uddin Naqshband Bukhari	Qasr-e-Aarifan, Bukhara, Uzbekistan	4 Muharram 718 AH (8/9 March 1318 CE)	3 Rabi al-Awwal 791 AH (2/3 March 1389 CE)
18	Khwaja Ala'uddin Attar Bukhari	Jafaaniyan, Transoxiana,Uzbekistan		Wed 20 Rajab 804 AH (23 February 1402 CE)
19	Khwaja Yaqub Charkhi	Gulistan, Dushanbe, Tajikistan	762 AH (1360/1361 CE)	5 Safar 851 AH (21/22 April 1447 CE)
20	Khwaja Ubaidullah Ahrar	Samarkand, Uzbekistan	Ramadan 806 AH (March/April 1404 CE)	29 Rabi al-Awwal 895 AH (19/20 February 1490 CE)
21	Khwaja Muhammad Zahid Wakhshi	Wakhsh	14 Shawwal 852 AH (11/12 December 1448 CE)	1 Rabi al-Awwal 936 AH (3/4 November 1529 CE)
22	Khwaja Durwesh Muhammad	Asqarar, Uzbekistan	16 Shawwal 846 AH (17/18 February 1443 CE)	19 Muharram 970 AH (18/19 September 1562 CE)
23	Khwaja Muhammad Amkanaki	Amkana, Bukhara, Uzbekistan	918 AH (1512/1513 CE)	22 Shaban 1008 AH (8/9 March 1600 CE)
24	Khwaja Muhammad Baqi Billah Berang	Delhi, India	5 Dhu al-Hijjah 971 or 972 AH (14 July 1564 / 3 July 1565)	25 Jumada al-Thani 1012 AH (29/30 November 1603 CE)
25	Shaikh Ahmad al-Fārūqī al-Sirhindī, Imām Rabbānī	Sirhind, India	14 Shawwal 971 AH (25/26 May 1564 CE)	28 Safar 1034 AH (9/10 December 1624 CE)
26	Imām Khwaja Muhammad Masum Fārūqī	Sirhind, India	1007 AH (1598/1599 CE)	9 Rabi al-Awwal 1099 AH (13/14 January 1688 CE)
27	Khwaja Muhammad Saif ud-Dīn Fārūqī	Sirhind, India	1049 AH (1639/1640 CE)	19 or 26 Jumada al-awwal 1096 AH (April 1685 CE)
28	Sayyid Nur Muhammad Badayuni	Delhi, India		11 Dhu al-Qi'dah 1135AH (12/13 August 1723 CE)
29	Shaheed Mirza Mazhar Jan-e-Janaan, Shams-ud-Dīn Habībullāh	Delhi, India	11 Ramadan 1111 AH (2/3 March 1700 CE)	10 Muharram 1195 AH (Fri 5 January 1781 CE)
30	Khwaja Abdullah Dehlavi, alias Shah Ghulam Ali Dehlavi	Delhi, India	1156 AH (1743 CE)	22 Safar 1240 AH (15/16 October 1824 CE)
31	Hāfīz Abu Sā‘īd Fāruqī Mujaddidī	Delhi, India	2 Dhu al-Qi'dah 1196 AH (9/10 October 1782 CE)	1 Shawwal 1250 AH (30/31 January 1835 CE)
32	Khwaja Shah Ahmed Sā‘īd Fāruqī Mujaddidi ibn Hāfīz Abu Sā‘īd Fāruqī	Madinah, Saudi Arabia		2 Rabi al-Awwal 1277 AH (18/19 September 1860 CE)
33	Khwaja Muhammed Mazhar İş’an Can-ı Cânân ibn Khwaja Ahmed Sā‘īd Fāruqī	India	1248 AH (1832 CE)	Madina (1883 CE)
34	Khwaja Selahüddin İbn-i Mevlana Siracüddin	Osh - Kyrgyzstan	(1843 CE)	Osh - Kyrgyzstan (13 November 1910, CE)
35	Süleyman Hilmi Tunahan	Istanbul, Turkey	(1888 CE)	(September 16, 1959 CE)
