= Haji Dost Muhammad Qandhari =

Afghan saint

Dost Muhammad Qandhari

Personal life
- Born: 1801 Kandahar, Durrani Empire (Now Afghanistan)
- Died: 17 February 1868 (aged 66–67) Mussa Zai Sharif, Punjab, British India (Now Khyber Pakhtunkhwa, Pakistan)

Religious life
- Religion: Islam
- Denomination: Sunni
- Jurisprudence: Hanafi
- Tariqa: Naqshbandi

Muslim leader
- Influenced by: Abul-Hassan Kharaqani Baha-ud-Din Naqshband Bukhari Mir Sayyid Ali Hamadani Ahmad Sirhindi Abu Hanifa Shah Ahmed Saeed Mujaddidi
- Influenced: Khwaja Muhammad Usman Damani Jan-Fishan Khan Muhammad Tahir Bakhshi

Khwaja Haji Dost Muhammad Qandhari (Pashto: حاجی دوست محمد قندھاری) was an Afghan Sufi master in the Naqshbandi tradition in the 19th century (1801–1868).

== Biography ==
Dost Muhammad was born and received his early education in Kandahar in Afghanistan. While still a young man he encountered the great Indian Naqshbandi master Ghulam Ali Dehlavi (1743–1824) in the Prophet's Mosque in Medina. He reported that Ghulam Ali's spiritual energy (fayz) was so strong that it caused him to become restless and disturbed, to the extent that he was hardly able to move from his place. Returning to India, he continued to be subject to ecstatic states, some of which lasted for several weeks. Ghulam Ali died, however, before Dost Muhammad could become a disciple. So instead he applied to Ghulam Ali's successor Abu Sa'eed Mujaddidi Rampuri. At the time Abu Sa'eed was leaving for the Hajj and sent Dost Muhammad to his son (and successor) Shah Ahmed Sa'eed Dehlvi (1802–1860).

Within 14 months of staying with his Shaykh, Haji Dost Muhammad became Ahmed Sa'eed's khalifa in the Qandahar region of Afghanistan. Following the assassination in 1842 of Shah Shuja, the ruler of Afghanistan (and client of the British), Dost Muhammad was forced to leave the country. (These same events also forced the departure from Afghanistan of his most celebrated disciple, Sayyid Muhammed Shah Jan-Fishan Khan Paghmani). Ahmed Sa'eed advised Dost Muhammad to establish himself in a place where "both Pashto and Punjabi are spoken". Following this instruction, Dost Muhammad settled in the village of Musazai Sharif, near to Dera Ismail Khan (now in Pakistan), where he established a teaching centre and is buried.

=== Death and Successor ===
Dost Muhammad's successor was Khwaja Muhammad Usman Damani, to whom he gave unrestricted permission to teach "the methods of the Naqshbandiyya Mujaddidiya Ma'sumiyya Mazhariyya and the Qadiriyya, Chistiyya, Suhrawardiyya, Kubrawiyya, Shattariyya, Madariyya, Qalandariyya and other Sufi lineages". He also handed over to him all his Islamic centers including Musazai Sharif, his personal library and other assets.

Haji Dost Muhammad died on 22 Shawwal 1284 AH (17 February 1868) and was buried in Mussa Zai Sharif, district Dera Ismail Khan in present-day Pakistan.

In The Way of the Sufi, Idries Shah attributes this "sentence of the Khajagan" to Dost Muhammad (who he calls Qandahari):

"You hear my words. Hear, too, that there are words other than mine. These are not meant for hearing with the physical ear. Because you see only me, you think there is no Sufism apart from me. You are here to learn, not to collect historical information."

== Spiritual chain of succession ==
Haji Dost Muhammad Qandhari belonged to the Mujaddidi order of Sufism, which is the main branch of Naqshbandi Sufi tariqah. His spiritual lineage goes to Muhammad, through Shaikh Ahmad Sirhindi, the Mujaddid of eleventh Hijri century. The complete lineage is as under:

1. Sayyadna Muhammad (died 11 AH, buried Madinah SA (570/571 - 632 CE))
2. Sayyadna Abu Bakr Siddiq, (d. 13 AH, buried Madinah, SA)
3. Sayyadna Salman al-Farsi, (d. 35 AH, buried Madaa'in, SA)
4. Imam Qasim ibn Muhammad ibn Abi Bakr (d. 107 AH, buried Madinah, SA)
5. Imam Jafar Sadiq, (after which moved to Iran; d. 148 AH buried Madinah, SA)
6. Shaikh Bayazid Bastami, (d. 261 AH, buried Bistaam, Iraq (804 - 874 CE))
7. Shaikh Abul Hassan Kharqani, (d. 425 AH buried, Kharqaan, Iran)
8. Shaikh Abul Qasim Gurgani, (d. 450 AH, buried Gurgan, Iran)
9. Shaikh Abu Ali Farmadi, (after which he moved to Turkmenistan; d. 477 AH, buried Tous, Khorasan, Iran)
10. Khwaja Abu Yaqub Yusuf Hamadani, (d. 535 AH, buried Maru, Khorosan, Iran)
11. Khwaja Abdul Khaliq Ghujdawani, (d. 575 AH, buried Ghajdawan, Bukhara, Uzbekistan)
12. Khwaja Arif Reogari, (d. 616 AH, buried Reogar, Bukhara, Uzbekistan)
13. Khwaja Mahmood Anjir-Faghnawi, (d. 715 AH, buried Waabakni, Mawralnahar)
14. Shaikh Azizan Ali Ramitani, (d. 715 AH, buried Khwaarizm, Bukhara, Uzbekistan)
15. Shaikh Muhammad Baba Samasi, (d. 755 AH, buried Samaas, Bukhara, Uzbekistan)
16. Shaikh Sayyid Amir Kulal, (d. 772 AH, buried Saukhaar, Bukhara, Uzbekistan)
17. Shaikh Muhammad Baha'uddin Naqshband, (d. 791 AH, buried Qasr-e-Aarifan, Bukhara, Uzbekistan (1318–1389 CE))
18. Shaikh Ala'uddin Attar Bukhari, (buried Jafaaniyan, Mawranahar, Uzbekistan)
19. Shaikh Yaqub Charkhi, (d. 851 AH, buried Charkh, Bukhara, Uzbekistan)
20. Shaikh Ubaidullah Ahrar, (d. 895 AH, buried Samarkand, Uzbekistan)
21. Shaikh Muhammad Zahid Wakhshi, (d. 936 AH, buried Wakhsh, Malk Hasaar)
22. Shaikh Durwesh Muhammad, (d. 970 AH, buried Samarkand, Uzbekistan)
23. Shaikh Muhammad Amkanaki, (after which moved to India; d. 1008 AH, buried Akang, Bukhara, Uzbekistan)
24. Shaikh Muhammad Baqi Billah Berang, (d. 1012 AH, buried Delhi, India)
25. Shaikh Ahmad Faruqi Sirhindi, (d. 1034 AH, buried Sarhand, India (1564–1624 CE))
26. Muhammad Masum Sirhindi, (d. 1079 AH, buried Sarhand, India)
27. Muhammad Saifuddin Faruqi Mujaddidi, (d. 1096 AH, buried Sarhand, India)
28. Hafiz Muhammad Mohsin (Delhi, India, d. 1147 AH)
29. Sayyid Nur Muhammad Badayuni, (India, d. 1135 AH)
30. Mirza Mazhar Jan-e-Janaan, (Delhi, India, d. 1195 AH)
31. Abdullah Dahlawi, alias Shah Ghulam Ali Dehlavi, (d. 1240 AH)
32. Shaikh Abu-Saeed Faruqi Mujaddidi, (buried in Delhi, India, d. 1250 AH)
33. Shaikh Shah Ahmed Saeed Faruqi Mujaddidi, (buried in Madinah, d. 1277 AH)
34. Khwaja Dost Muhammad Qandhari, Musa Zai Sharif, (Dera Ismail, Pakistan, d. 1284 AH)

== His Khulafa ==
- Khwaja Muhammad Usman Damani, his successor
- Mawlana Rahim Bakhsh Punjabi, who was sent to take charge of Khanqah Mazharia in Delhi
- Mawlana Amanullah Herati (his spiritual legacy is still active in Iran)
- Mawlana Ahmed Deen, teacher of Sayyad Laal Shah Hamdani
- Mawlana Muhammad Adil (he entered the tariqah after a long debate with the shaykh)
- Mawlana Nizamuddin
