= Sayyid Ghulam Hussain Shah Bukhari =

Pakistani Sufi cleric (1932–2023)

Syed Ghulam Hussain Shah Bukhari
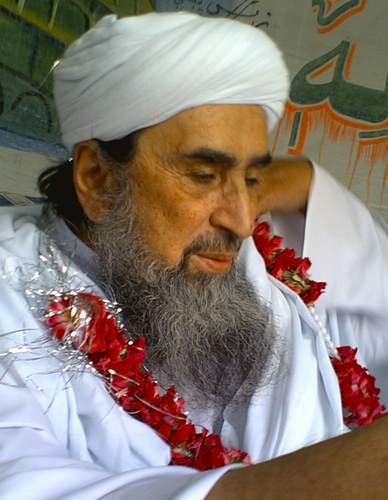
- Bukhari in 2014
- Born: 1932; Deh Drib Chandia, Qambar Shahdadkot, Bombay Presidency, British India
- Died: 26 January 2023 (aged 90); Karachi, Sindh, Pakistan

Philosophical work
- School: Sunni Islam, Hanafi, Sufi, Naqshbandi

Syed Ghulam Hussain Shah Bukhari (Sindhi: سيّد غلام حسين شاهه بخاري; 1932 – 26 January 2023) was a Sindhi Pakistani Islamic scholar. He belonged to the Naqshbandi Sufi school of thought. He managed the Dargah Hussainabad,.

== Biography ==
Syed Ghulam Hussain Shah Bukhari was born in 1932 in the village of Drib Chandia, Qambar Shahdadkot, Bombay Presidency, British India.

In 1980, he built a masjid and madrassa titled Dargah Hussainabad where religious education and accommodation is free of all political associations. He was also the head of Tanzeem Islahul Fuqra Al-Hussainia, that also provides religious education to people.

In 2013 Bukhari was attacked by terrorists.

Bukhari died at Karachi's private hospital on 26 January 2023, at the age of 90.

== See also ==
- Pir Fazal Ali Qureshi
- Khwaja Abdul Ghaffar Naqshbandi
