= Inamullah Khan Yaqeen =

Mughal Indian poet

- Born: 1727; Maratha Empire, Mughal India
- Died: 1755 (aged 27–28); Maratha Empire, Mughal India
- Occupation: Poet
- Parent: Nawab Azharuddin Khan
- Writing career
- Pen name: Yaqeen
- Language: Urdu
- Genre: Ghazal

Inamullah Khan Yaqeen (1727 – 1755) was a Mughal Indian poet. He wrote one hundred seventy ghazals, a genre of Urdu poetry. Most of his ghazals include five couplets, leading his writings to become one of the distinguished poetry. In 2007, Dr Md. Zahidul Haque, presently Associate Professor in the Urdu Department of the University of Hyderabad wrote a book titled Inamullah Khan Yaqeen: Ahad aur Shairi (Inamullah Khan Yaqeen: Age and Poetry) on Yaqeen's life which was published by Rao Publishing House.

== Biography ==
A disciple of Mirza Mazhar Jan-e-Janaan, he was born around 1827-28 in Maratha Empire (in modern-day Delhi). He died in Delhi at the age of 28 around 1755-56, however some uncertain literary historians claim that he was murdered by his father Nawab Azharuddin Khan.
