= Tunahan =

Tunahan is a Turkish surname and given name. Notable people with the name include:

- Süleyman Hilmi Tunahan (1888–1959), Ottoman Islamic scholar
- Tunahan Cicek (born 1992), Swiss footballer
- Tunahan Kuzu (born 1981), Turkish-Dutch politician
- Tunahan Taşçı (born 2002), Dutch footballer
