= Jumada =

Jumada may refer to:

- Jumada I, the fifth month of the Islamic calendar
- Jumada II, the sixth month of the Islamic calendar
