= Ghulam Ali Dehlavi =

Indian Islamic scholar (1743–1824)

Shah Ghulam Ali Dehlavi

Personal life
- Born: 1743 Patiala, Sikh Confederacy
- Died: 16 October 1824 (aged 80–81) Dehli, Mughal Empire

Religious life
- Religion: Islam
- Denomination: Sunni
- Jurisprudence: Hanafi
- Tariqa: Naqshbandi
- Creed: Maturidi

Muslim leader
- Influenced by: Abul-Hassan Kharaqani Baha-ud-Din Naqshband Bukhari Ahmad Sirhindi Abu Hanifa al-Maturidi Mirza Mazhar Jan-e-Janaan
- Influenced: Abu Saeed Ahmadi Khalid al-Baghdadi Muhammad Tahir Bakhshi

Shah Abdullah alias Shah Ghulam Ali Dehlavi (1743–1824, Urdu:شاہ غلام علی دہلوی) was a Sufi Shaykh in Delhi during the early 19th century. He was a master of the Naqshbandi tradition. His father wanted to make him a disciple of Qādri.

== Biography ==
He was born in 1156 AH (1743 C.E.) in Patiala, Punjab, in present-day India. His father was Shah Abdul-Latif, a scholar and Sufi shaykh belonging to the Qadri tariqah. It is reported in his biographies that his father had a dream before his birth in which he saw Sayyadna Ali, who told him to name the baby on his name (Ali). After he grew up, he modified his own name to be Ghulam Ali (literally meaning slave of Ali, a common name in Indian Muslims today).

He is reported to have memorized the Quran in a single month's duration. In 1170 AH he came to Delhi to take the oath of allegiance to Mirza Mazhar Jan-e-Janaan, who was a famous Shaykh of Naqshbandi tariqah in Delhi at that time. After getting trained in the major Sufi orders including Naqshbandi for 15 years, he received complete Khilafat (spiritual Ijazah) from his Shaykh.

He had many Khulafa (deputies) who spread the Naqshbandi Sufi order to a vast number of people in the whole Muslim world at that time. His Khulafa went to Bukhara, Baghdad, Madinah and Turkey. His famous khalifa was Mawlana Khalid al-Baghdadi, who had hundreds of thousands of followers in his lifetime, and many Naqshbandi's today in Turkey and nearby countries follow him. His chief deputy and successor was Hafiz Abu-Saeed-Ahmadi Faruqi Mujaddidi Naqshbandi (Delhi) and his next successor was Hafiz Shah Ahmed Saeed Faruqi Mujaddidi, son of Hafiz Shah Abu Saeed (Medina)

He is quoted to have said: "My Faid (spirituality) has reached far off countries. Our Halqa is held in Makkah and our Halqa is held in Madinah. Similarly our Halqa is held in Baghdad, Rome (now Turkey and Cyprus) and Maghrib (Parts of Europe and Africa facing Asia). And Bukhara is our parental home."

He died on 22 Safar 1240 AH (15/16 October 1824) and was buried alongside his Shaykh's grave in Khanqah Mirza in Delhi.

=== Writings ===
He wrote books, the best known being Mazhari in Persian, which is a complete biography of his shaykh Mirza Mazhar Jan-e-Janaan Shaheed.

His other books are:

- Edah-e-Tariqat
- Ahwal-e-Buzurgaan
- Risalah dar Tariqah Ba'yat wa Azkar
- Risalah dar Tariqah Naqshband
- Risalah Sitri Chand dar Ahwal-e-Shah-e-Naqshband
- Risalah-e-Azkar
- Risalah-e-Muraqbat
- Risalah dar Aitarazat Shaykh Abdul-Haq bar Hazrat Mujaddid
- Risalah Mashgooliyah
- Sulook Raqia Naqshbandia
- Makateeb Shareefa (collection of his letters)
- Kamalat-e-Mazhariya
- Malfoozat-e-Sharifa

=== Naqshbandi chain ===
#	Name	Buried	Birth	Death
14	Khwaja Azizan Ali Ramitani	Khwaarizm, Uzbekistan	591 AH (1194 C.E)	27 Ramadan 715 or 721 AH (25/26 December 1315 or 20/21 October 1321)
15	Khwaja Muhammad Baba Samasi	Samaas, Bukhara, Uzbekistan	25 Rajab 591 AH (5/6 July 1195 C.E)	10 Jumada al-Thani 755 AH (2/3 July 1354 C.E)
16	Khwaja Sayyid Amir Kulal	Saukhaar, Bukhara, Uzbekistan	676 AH (1277/1278 C.E)	Wed 2 Jumada al-Thani 772 AH (21/22 December 1370 C.E)
17	Khwaja Muhammad Baha'uddin Naqshband Bukhari	Qasr-e-Aarifan, Bukhara, Uzbekistan	4 Muharram 718 AH (8/9 March 1318 C.E)	3 Rabi al-Awwal 791 AH (2/3 March 1389 C.E)
18	Khwaja Ala'uddin Attar Bukhari, son-in-law of (17)	Jafaaniyan, Transoxiana (Uzbekistan)		Wed 20 Rajab 804 AH (23 February 1402 C.E)
19	Khwaja Yaqub Charkhi	Gulistan, Dushanbe, Tajikistan	762 AH (1360/1361 C.E)	5 Safar 851 AH (21/22 April 1447 C.E)
20	Khwaja Ubaidullah Ahrar	Samarkand, Uzbekistan	Ramadan 806 AH (March/April 1404 C.E)	29 Rabi al-Awwal 895 AH (19/20 February 1490 C.E)
21	Khwaja Muhammad Zahid Wakhshi	Wakhsh	14 Shawwal 852 AH (11/12 December 1448 C.E)	1 Rabi al-Awwal 936 AH (3/4 November 1529 C.E)
22	Khwaja Durwesh Muhammad, son of sister of (21)	Asqarar, Uzbekistan	16 Shawwal 846 AH (17/18 February 1443 C.E)	19 Muharram 970 AH (18/19 September 1562 C.E)
23	Khwaja Muhammad Amkanaki, son of (22)	Amkana, Bukhara, Uzbekistan	918 AH (1512/1513 C.E)	22 Shaban 1008 AH (8/9 March 1600 C.E)
24	Khwaja Muhammad Baqi Billah Berang	Delhi, India	5 Dhu al-Hijjah 971 or 972 AH (14 July 1564 / 3 July 1565)	25 Jumada al-Thani 1012 AH (29/30 November 1603 C.E)
25	Shaikh Ahmad al-Farūqī al-Sirhindī, Imām Rabbānī	Sirhind, India	14 Shawwal 971 AH (25/26 May 1564 C.E)	28 Safar 1034 AH (9/10 December 1624 C.E)
26	Imām Khwaja Muhammad Masum Faruqi, 3rd son of (25)	Sirhind, India	1007 AH (1598/1599 C.E)	9 Rabi al-Awwal 1099 AH (13/14 January 1688 C.E)
27	Khwaja Muhammad Saifuddin Faruqi, son of (26)	Sirhind, India	1049 AH (1639/1640 C.E)	19 or 26 Jumada al-awwal 1096 AH (April 1685 C.E)
28	Hafiz Muhammad Mohsin Dehlavi	Delhi, India		
29	Sayyid Nur Muhammad Badayuni	Delhi, India		11 Dhu al-Qi'dah 1135AH (12/13 August 1723 C.E)
30	Shaheed Mirza Mazhar Jan-e-Janaan, Shams-ud-Dīn Habībullāh	Delhi, India	11 Ramadan 1111 AH (2/3 March 1700 C.E)	10 Muharram 1195 AH (Fri 5 January 1781 C.E)
31	Khwaja Abdullah Dehlavi, alias Shah Ghulam Ali Dehlavi	Delhi, India	1156 AH (1743 C.E)	22 Safar 1240 AH (15/16 October 1824 C.E)

=== Qadri chain ===
Extracted from Maqamat Mazhari by Shah Ghulam Ali Dehlavi

1. Shah Ghulam Ali Dehlavi
2. Mirza Mazhar Jan-e-Janaan
3. Muhammad Abid Sanami
4. Abdul Ahad
5. Muhammad Said
6. Ahmed Sirhindi
7. Abdul Ahad Faruqi
8. Shah Kamal Kethali
9. Shah Fuzail
10. Gada e Rahman Sani
11. Shamsuddin Arif
12. Gada e Rahman Awal
13. Shamsuddin Sehrai
14. Aqeel
15. Abdul Wahhab
16. Sharfuddin
17. Abdur Razzaq
18. Abdul-Qadir Gilani

=== Chishti chain ===
Extracted from Maqamat Mazhari by Shah Ghulam Ali Dehlavi

1. Shah Ghulam Ali Dehlvi
2. Mirza Mazhar Jan-e-Janaan
3. Muhammad Abid Sanami
4. Abdul Ahad Sirhindi
5. Muhammad Said
6. Ahmed Sirhindi
7. Abdul Ahad Faruqi
8. Ruknuddin
9. Abdul Quddus Gangohi
10. Muhammad Arif
11. Ahmed Abdul Haq
12. Jalaluddin Panipati
13. Shamsuddin Turk Panipati
14. Alauddin Sabir Kaliyari
15. Fariduddin Ganjshakar
16. Qutbuddin Bakhtiar Kaki
17. Khwaja Moinuddin Chishti

== His Khulafa ==
His Khulafa were numerous and many of them were prominent Shaykhs at their times. Following is a list of his most prominent Khulafa as extracted from various sources.

1. Mawlana Hafiz Abu-Saeed-Ahmadi Faruqi Mujaddidi Naqshbandi, his successor (Delhi)
2. Mawlana Hafiz Shah Ahmed Saeed Faruqi Mujaddidi, son of Hafiz Shah Abu Saeed (Medina)
3. Shah Rauf Ahmed Raaft Faruqi Mujaddidi Rampuri (Bhopal)
4. Mawlana Khalid al-Baghdadi al-Kurdi al-Rumi (Turkey)
5. Mawlana Ismaeel Madani (Medina)
6. Mawlana Ghulam Mohiuddin Qusoori
7. Mawlana Bashartullah Behra'ichi
8. Mawlana Shah Gul Muhammad Ghaznavi (Bukhara)
9. Mawlana Muhammad Sharif (Sirhind)
10. Mawlana Pir Muhammad (Kashmir)
11. Mawlana Jan Muhammad (Herat)
12. Mawlana Muhammad Jan (Makkah, d.1266 AH), whose Khulafa spread up to Turkey
13. Shah Saad'ullah Naqshbandi (Hyderabad)
