= Osama Abdel Azim =

Egyptian Islamic scholar (1948–2022)

Osama Muhammad Abd al-Azim Hamza
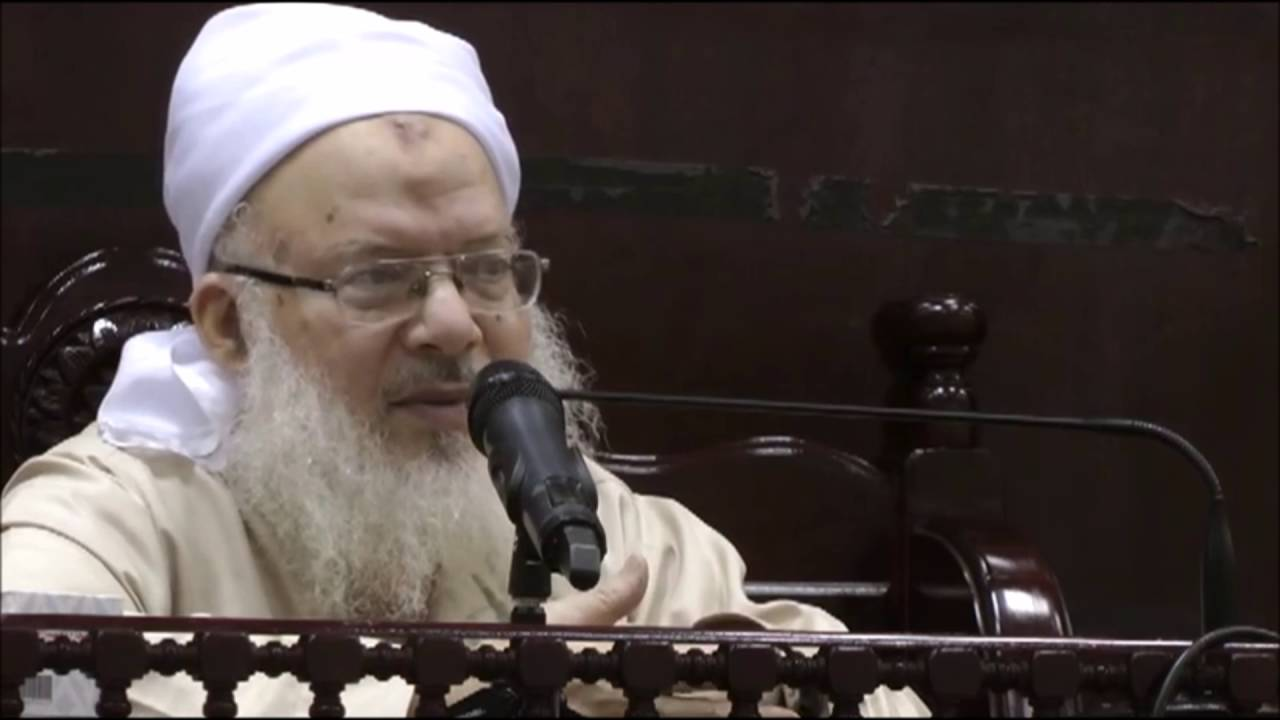
- Born: 25 January 1948; Khalifa district, Cairo, Egypt
- Died: 3 October 2022 (aged 74)
- Education: Higher Department of Islamic and Arabic Studies, Al-Azhar University (1969) Master's degree in the principles of jurisprudence, Al-Azhar University (1974) Bachelor of Engineering, Al-Azhar University (1976) Doctorate in Usul al-Fiqh, Al-Azhar University (1983)
- Occupation: Islamic scholar
- Notable work: al-Mankhūl min taʻlīqāt al-uṣūl al-Masāʼil al-ʻaskarīyah al-Baṣāʼir al-Nuṣayrīyah fī ʻilm al-manṭiq
- Title: Former Head of the Sharia Department and Professor of Jurisprudence at the Faculty of Islamic Studies for Boys in Al-Azhar University, Cairo

Osama Muhammad Abd al-Azim Hamza (25 January 1948 – 3 October 2022) was an Egyptian Islamic scholar and former head of the Sharia Department and Professor of Jurisprudence at the Faculty of Islamic Studies for Boys in Al-Azhar University, Cairo.

== Early life and education ==
He was born on 25 January 1948 in the Khalifa district of Cairo. He graduated from the Higher Department of Islamic and Arabic Studies at the Faculty of Sharia and Law at Al-Azhar University in 1969. Then he obtained a master’s degree in the principles of jurisprudence from the Department of Fundamentals of Jurisprudence at the Faculty of Sharia and Law in Cairo in 1974, and the subject of the supplementary research was “the authenticity of the words of the companion.” He received his Bachelor of Engineering from the Department of Mechanical Engineering at the Faculty of Engineering, Al-Azhar University in Cairo in 1976, he obtained his doctorate in Usul al-Fiqh from the Department of Fundamentals of Jurisprudence at the College of Sharia and Law at Al-Azhar University in Cairo, with first honors in 1983, and the topic of his thesis was "The Book of Liberation for what is in the curricula of assets from what is movable and reasonable" by Wali al-Din al-Orabi, investigation and study.

== Career ==
He was appointed a teacher of the principles of jurisprudence at the College of Islamic and Arabic Studies for Boys in Cairo on September 2, 1986. He obtained the rank of assistant professor in the principles of jurisprudence on September 2, 1992. He obtained a professorship in the principles of jurisprudence on June 5, 1999. He headed the Islamic Sharia Department at the College of Islamic and Arabic Studies for Boys in Cairo from July 9, 1999 to July 21, 2008. He became a full-time professor since August 1, 2008.

== Writings ==
Osama Abdel Azim has authored many fundamentalist books and scientific researches, including:

- al-Mankhūl min taʻlīqāt al-uṣūl
- al-Masāʼil al-ʻaskarīyah
- al-Baṣāʼir al-Nuṣayrīyah fī ʻilm al-manṭiq
- Durr al-asrār fī tafsīr al-Qurʼān bi-al-ḥurūf al-muhmalah
- al-Muntakhab fī al-nuwab
- al-Mughnī fī uṣūl al-fiqh
- al-Sīrah al-Nabawīyah: minhāj ḥayāh
- al-Ṭabaqāt al-kubrá: al-musammāh bi-Lawāqiḥ al-anwār fī ṭabaqāt al-akhyār
- L'Accord unanime de la communauté comme fondement des statuts légaux de l'Islam d'après Abū l-Husayn al-Basrī
- Taḥqīq kalimat al-ikhlāṣ
- al-Ṣūfīyah wa-al-fuqarā
- Yaqaẓat ulī al-iʻtibār: mimmā warad fī dhikr al-nār wa-aṣḥāb al-nār
- al-Qasas al-Qur'ani wa-atharuha fi istinbat al-ahkam
- Mushkil iʻrāb al-Qurʼān

== Death ==
He died on the seventh of Rabi' al-Awwal 1444 AH corresponding to the third of October 2022 AD, after a struggle with illness. Thousands attended his funeral in a majestic scene, and hundreds gathered in the Eid prayer hall in Al-Tunisi area in Cairo to perform the funeral prayer, while social media was buzzing with messages of condolences for his death.
