= Sitta min Shawwāl =

Islamic practice

Sitta min Shawwal (Hausa: Sita Shawwal, Arabic: ستة من شوال, lit. 'six of Shawwal') is the Islamic practice of observing six voluntary days of fasting (sawm) during the month of Shawwal, the tenth month of the Islamic lunar calendar, which follows immediately after the month of Ramadan. The practice is grounded in a hadith attributed to the Prophet Muhammad recorded in Sahih Muslim, which states that observing the fast of Ramadan followed by six days of fasting in Shawwal is equivalent in reward to fasting for an entire year. The fasts are widely described as Sunnah Mu'akkadah, an emphasised voluntary act by the majority of Islamic scholars across all four major Sunni schools of jurisprudence (madhabs).

In the Hausa-speaking Muslim communities of West Africa particularly in northern Nigeria, Niger, and neighbouring Sahel countries the practice is commonly known by its Hausa name Sita Shawwal (sita meaning 'six' in Hausa). It is observed annually following the celebration of Eid al-Fitr and is regarded as one of the most meritorious voluntary acts of worship in the Islamic calendar.

== Etymology and nomenclature ==
The term Sita Shawwal is a Hausa-Arabic compound. In Hausa, sita (from the Arabic sitta, ستة) means 'six', while Shawwal (شوال) is the name of the tenth Islamic lunar month. The Arabic term most commonly used in classical jurisprudence is Sitta min Shawwāl (ستة من شوال), meaning 'six [days] from Shawwal'. The name Shawwal derives from the Arabic root shāla (شال), meaning 'to lift' or 'to carry'. Spiritually, the month is understood as a period in which believers carry the good habits and devotion of Ramadan forward into the remainder of the year. The practice is also referred to in English-language Islamic literature as the six days of Shawwal, the six voluntary fasts of Shawwal, or simply Shawwal fasting. The term Sitta Shawwal (with a long a in sitta) is also encountered in scholarly Arabic sources.

== Religious basis ==
=== Primary hadith ===
The doctrinal basis for the six fasts of Shawwal is a hadith narrated by Abu Ayyub al-Ansari and recorded in Sahih Muslim (No. 1164). The Prophet Muhammad ﷺ said:

"Whoever fasts the month of Ramadan and then follows it with six days of fasting in the month of Shawwal, it will be as if he has fasted the year through."

— Sahih Muslim, Kitab al-Siyam, No. 1164

The same tradition is also recorded in several other major hadith collections, including Sunan Abu Dawud, Sunan al-Tirmidhi, Sunan al-Nasa'i, and Sunan Ibn Majah, all of which authenticate the narration.

=== Supporting hadith and Qur'anic basis ===
A complementary hadith narrated by Thawban and recorded in Sahih Ibn Khuzaymah (No. 2115) and Sunan al-Nasa'i al-Kubra (No. 2860) makes the arithmetic basis of the reward explicit. The Prophet ﷺ stated:

"The fast of Ramadan is like observing ten months of fasting. Fasting six days of Shawwal is like observing two months of fasting. This together is like fasting throughout the year."

— Sahih Ibn Khuzaymah, No. 2115

Scholars ground this calculation in the Qur'anic principle outlined in Surah Al-An'am (6:160), which states that every good deed is multiplied at least tenfold in divine reward. Accordingly, thirty days of Ramadan fasting is equivalent to 300 days, and six days of Shawwal fasting is equivalent to 60 days, together totalling 360 days approximately a full lunar year.
