= Sayyad Laal Shah Hamdani =

Sufi saint (died 1896)

- Died: 27 Shaban 1313 AH (29 January 1896); Danda Shah Bilawal, Punjab, Pakistan

Philosophical work
- Region: Islamic scholar/Sufi
- School: Islam, Sufi

Sayyad Laal Shah Hamdani was an Islamic scholar and prominent Sufi shaykh of Naqshbandi tariqah in South Asia (Present day Pakistan).

Sayyad Laal Shah studied the Islamic sciences from Shaykh Ahmed Deen who was a khalifa of Haji Dost Muhammad Qandhari. Afterwards, he took oath of allegiance with Haji Dost Muhammad Qandhari at the khanqah Daman in Naqshbandi tariqah. After the death of his first shaykh, he took second oath of allegiance with Khwaja Muhammad Usman Damani Naqshbandi and received Khilafat from him. He is considered one of the major Khulafa of Khwaja Damani.

He died on 27 Shaban 1313 AH (29 January 1896). His shrine is in Danda Shah Bilawal and is a place often visited.

== His Khulafa ==
- Khwaja Pir Fazal Ali Qureshi Naqshbandi who received first Khilafat from him, and later from Khwaja Sirajuddin Naqshbandi
