= Sanaullah Panipati =

Sunni Muslim scholar (1765–1847)

Qāzi Muhammad Sanaullah Panipati

Personal life
- Born: 1730
- Died: 1810 (aged 79–80)
- Main interest(s): Tafsir, Tasawwuf
- Notable work: Tafsir al-Mazhari

Religious life
- Religion: Islam
- Denomination: Sunni
- Jurisprudence: Hanafi
- Tariqa: Naqshbandi
- Creed: Maturidi

Muslim leader
- Influenced by: Ahmed Sirhindi, Mir Sayyid Ali Hamadani, Ghazali, Mirza Mazhar Jan-e-Janaan, Shah Waliullah Dehlawi

Sanaullah Panipati (1765–1847) was a Sunni Muslim scholar and an exegete from Panipat who authored the Tafsir al-Mazhari. According to Islamic foundation Bangladesh, kazi Muhammad Sanaullah Panipathee was born in the year 1730 and died in the year 1810.

== Biography ==
Pānipati was born in 1143 AH, or 1795 A.D.. Aged seven, he memorized the Quran and then completed the studies of hadith under Shah Waliullah. He became a "murid" of Muhammad Abid Sinani, and became a disciple of Mirza Mazhar Jan-e-Janaan after Sinani's death.

Pānipati died in 1225 AH and was buried in Panipat.

== Literary works ==
- Tafsir al-Mazhari
- Mala Budda Minhu (Translated into Urdu by Kafilur Rahman Nishat Usmani and Ishtiaque Ahmad Qasmi.)
- Fasal e Khitab
- Irshad al-Talibeen
- Tazkara tul Miaad (Abridgment of Al badoor al Safira fi Amoor al Akhira by Jalal al-Din al-Suyuti)
- Tazkara tul Uloom Wal Mua'arif
- Khujista Guftaar Dar Manaqib e Ansar (A risala about manaqib of ansar his maternal forefathers)
- Taqdees ba Walid e Mustafa (Risala about the parents of Islamic prophet Muhammad)

== Views ==
In his work Ma La Budda Minhu, Qadi Thanaullah emphasized that it is kufr (an act of unbelief) "to suppose that something other than Allah is the true creator of any part of creation". This applies to whatever a human being strives to build, create, or make happen, because it is actually not them but Allah who "creates that act and brings it into existence".

The attributes of God, (his throne, his hand and face, presence in the hearts of believers, descent into the lowest heaven) mentioned in the

Quran and hadith must not be understood in their literal sense, and neither should we attempt to find interpretations (Ta'weel) for them. We should simply have faith in these things and ... we should entrust their interpretation to the knowledge of the Almighty. Man's lost in these matters ... is no more than ignorance and confusion."

He believed that the Prophets and angels are ma'soom or divinely protected from wrongdoing, but not the Shaaba (companions of the prophets) or Ahl al-Bayt (family of Muhammad). However to believe that the Shaaba did not get along is "to deny the Quran".

== Bibliography ==
- Muhammad Hanīf Gangohi. "Sāhib-e-Tafsīr-e-Mazhari". Zafrul Muhassilīn bi ahwāl il-Musannifīn (in Urdu). Deoband: Maktaba Dānish. pp. 47–49.
