= Allahabad Sharif =

Mosque and shrine in Kandiaro, Sindh, Pakistan

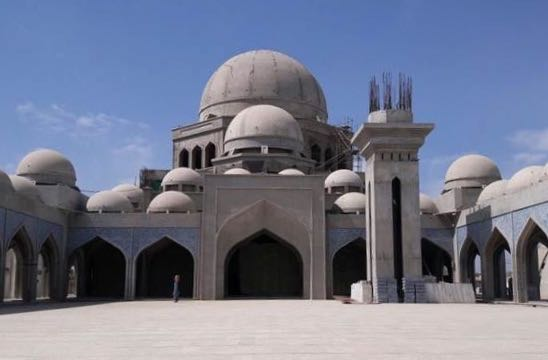

Religion
- Affiliation: Sunni Islam
- Sect: Sufism
- Ecclesiastical or organizational status: Mosque
- Leadership: Khwaja Muhammad Tahir Bakhshi Naqshbandi; Sufi Manzoor Qadir
- Status: Active

Location
- Location: Kandiaro, Sindh
- Country: Pakistan

Architecture
- Architect: Manzoor Qadir
- Type: Mosque architecture
- Style: Islamic; Ottoman; Saffavid

Specifications
- Capacity: 10,000 worshippers
- Length: 100 m (330 ft)
- Width: 55 m (180 ft)
- Dome: 101
- Dome height (outer): 35 m (115 ft)
- Dome dia. (outer): 20 m (64 ft)
- Minaret: 1
- Minaret height: 37 m (120 ft)
- Materials: Fair-faced concrete

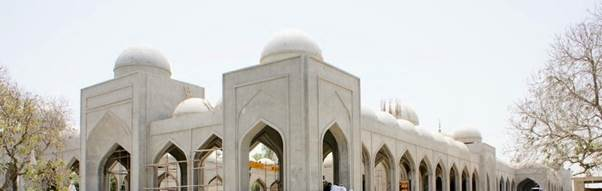
GMA Mosque panoramic

Allahabad Sharif, also known as Grand Mosque Allahabad (Sindhi: الهه آباد درٻار) is a mosque and shrine in Kandiaro, Naushahro Feroze District, Sindh, Pakistan. It is located on National Highway 415 kilometres (258 mi) from Karachi. The premises also house an education system up till Islamic University level, a hospital, an old age residence and an orphanage.

== Patronage ==
Khwaja Muhammad Tahir Bakhshi Naqshbandi (Urdu: حضرت خواجہ محمد طاہر بخشی نقشبندی), also known as Sajjan Saeen (Urdu: سجن سائیں, Sindhi: سڄڻ سائين), a prominent Naqshbandi Sufi shaykh in Pakistan is the main patron of the masjid.

== Architecture ==
The inspiration of Grand Mosque Allahabad has been drawn from the most traditional Islamic architectural sites. Preserving the (Kashi) hand painted tile heritage of the Indus valley Civilization while utilizing the most advanced technology of fair-finish concrete.

The mosque consists of 101 domes. The main dome is at a height of 35 metres (115 ft), the second dome 24 metres (78 ft), and the remaining 99 domes are 7.9 metres (26 ft), with one symbolic minaret at 37 metres (120 ft) indicating the unity of Allah. The domes and the sole minaret comprise the main design of the mosque.

== Finish ==
Allahabad Mosque is unique in design incorporating a fair finish concrete structure combined with hand painted porcelain tile work. Floral patterns have been preferred over geometric designs which require inch by inch details to transfer them onto porcelain tiles.

A group of senior artists volunteered to set up a production unit using hand painting techniques, selection of colours and the firing process to create masterpieces of kashi tiles. They produced kashi tiles for 12 years and continue to produce signature designs, floral and calligraphic patterns on Kashi tiles to adorn the mosque.

== Gallery ==
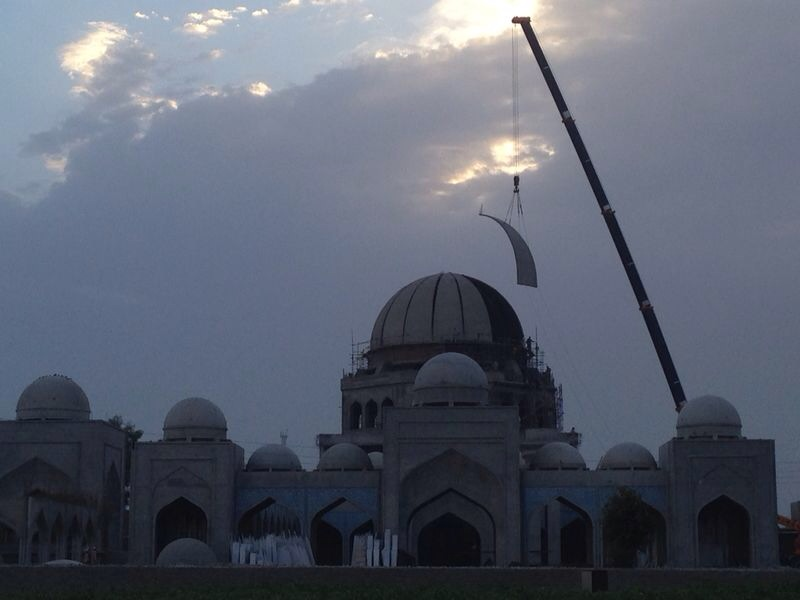
The final dome marked the completion of the mosque

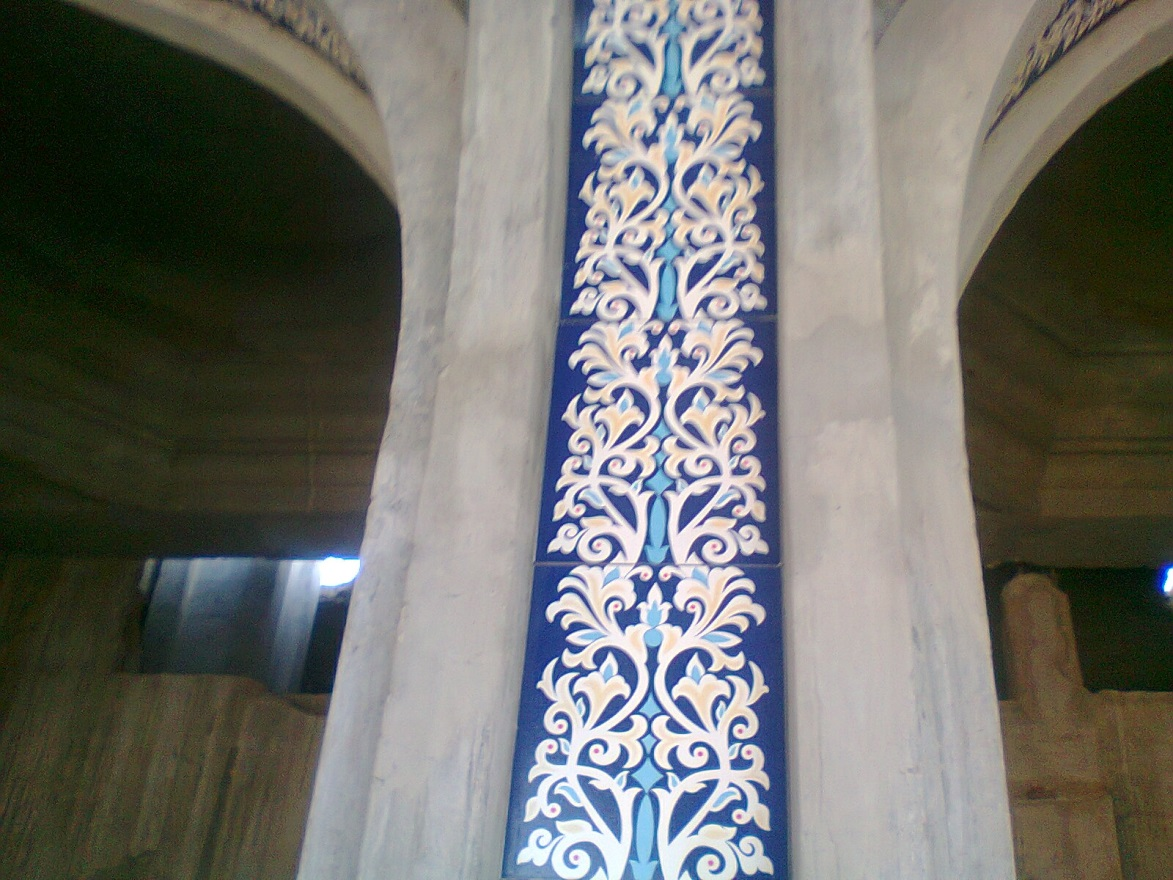
Hand-painted tile patterns

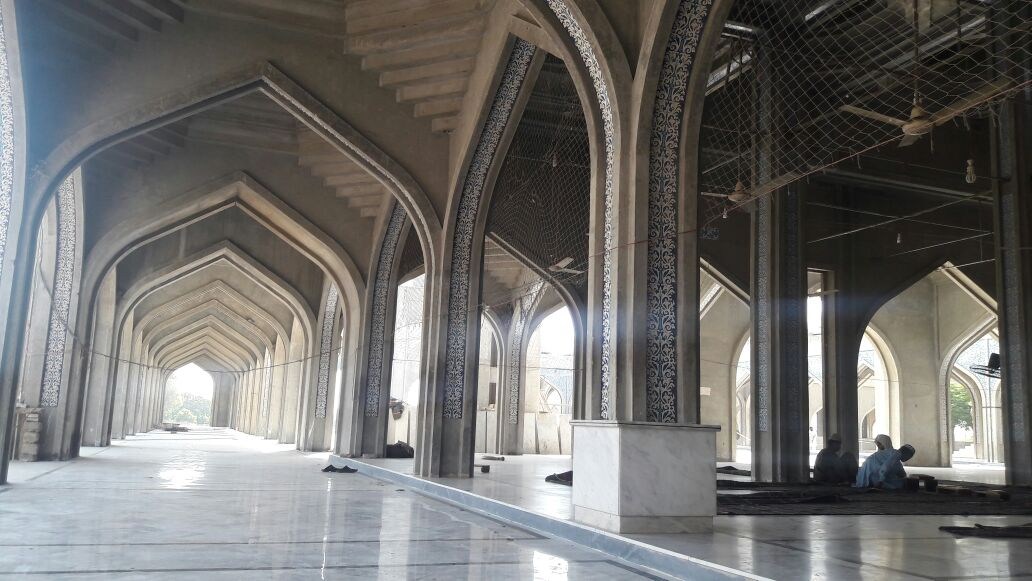
Inner corridor detail

== See also ==
- Islam in Pakistan
- List of mosques in Pakistan
