= Fazal Ali Qureshi =

Sufi scholar and saint (1853–1935)

Fazal Ali Qureshi Naqshbandi
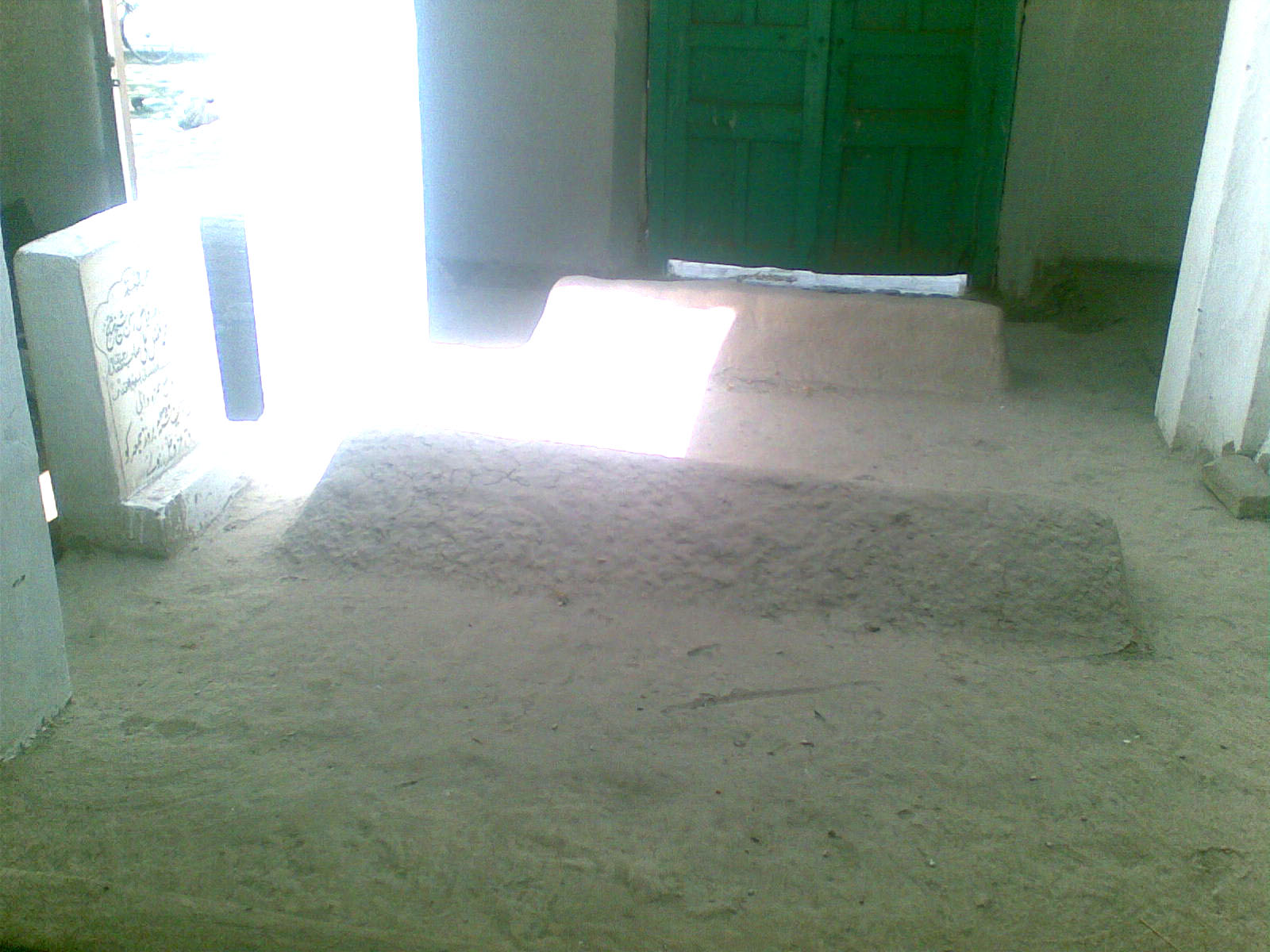
- Grave of Pir Fazal Ali Qureshi
- Born: Daud Khel, Punjab, Pakistan
- Died: 28 November 1935 = 1 Ramadan 1354 AH; Miskeenpur, Punjab, Pakistan

Philosophical work
- Region: Islamic scholar/Sufi
- School: Sunni Islam, Hanafi, Sufi, Naqshbandi

Hazrat Mawlana Pir Fazal Ali Shah Qureshi (Urdu: پیر فضل علی قریشی) was an Islamic scholar and the leading Naqshbandi Shaikh of colonial India in the early twentieth century. He was born to Murad Ali Shah in 1270 AH (1853 or 1854) in Daud Khel, Punjab, and died at 84 in the first night of Ramadan 1354 AH (28 November 1935) and was buried at Miskeenpur shareef, district Muzaffargarh, Punjab.

== Tariqat ==
He was a Shaikh of Naqshbandi Sufi order. He first went to Khwaja Muhammad Usman Damani for Ba'yah, but he was too old to take new followers. So he took the oath of allegiance with Sayyad Laal Shah Hamdani, who was a khalifa of Khwaja Usman. After the death of his Shaikh, he then did second oath of allegiance with the son and successor of Khwaja Usman, Khwaja Sirajuddin Naqshbandi and received Ijazah and Khilafat from him.

== Tabligh (Preaching) ==
He established the first spiritual center (Dargah/Khanqah) named Faqirpur Shareef in 1892 AH in district Muzaffargarh, Punjab. Due to the hard-to-reach location of Faqirpur, he established another spiritual center named Miskeenpur Shareef in the same district, near Shahar Sultan. He lived there for the rest of his life and was buried there.

His biographers have written that the number of days he spent in traveling for preaching, was greater than the days he spent at home. He traveled to many places of Sindh and Punjab, and also traveled to (current day) India for multiple times. He followed Hanafi school of law, and avoided the local schools of thought in India namely Deobandi Barelvi, rather followed the Naqshbandi school in all matters.

== Deobandi school ==
Shrine of Pir Fazal Ali Qureshi at Miskeenpur

The sheikh' biography states that he followed deobandi branch of the Hanafi school of thought, a view also held by his followers.

=== Shaykh Pir Qureshi and scholars of Deoband ===
Mawlana Abdul Malik writes in Tajalliyat that once the shaykh was in madrasah of Deoband, and at the time of Zuhr prayer, Qari Muhammad Tayyab came to lead the congregation. He had covered his head with a cap. After the prayer, the Shaykh said "Lack of following the great Sunnah even in the center of learning?", pointing to the lack of following the Sunnah of Amama (turban) during prayer. At this, Qari sahib asked someone to bring the Amama and put it near the place of Imam, so whoever would lead the congregation, would take that and place it on the head.

In the same book, Mawlana Siddiqi narrates that the mentioned scholar Qari Muhammad Tayyab was indeed too happy to see the shaykh and invited him at his home for food. Pir Qureshi accepted it and visited him. When the shaykh was leaving from his home, Qari Tayyab, out of pleasure and deep respect, helped the shaykh put on his shoes.

Another famous Deobandi scholar, Syed Ata Ullah Shah Bukhari was also devoted to the shaykh. Once he was traveling and passed near the village of shaykh and visited him. Pir Qureshi was ploughing his farm at the time. When Syed Bukhari met him and requested for praying for him, the shaykh taught him the Zikr-e-Qalbi (the remembrance of heart, the first lesson of Naqshbandi Sufi order). Syed Ata'ullah narrates that his heart immediately started doing this Zikr. From that time, Syed Bukhari was deeply devoted to the shaykh and is reported to have met him multiple times.

=== Beliefs ===
Shaykh Fazal Ali Sahib built himself a covered room meant to be his final burial place, and told this to Pir Mitha and Mawlana Abdul Sattar (brothers and khulafa of Pir Qureshi) and asked them to bury him there. At the time of death, Mawlana Abdul Sattar was there and he told the people the Shaykh's will, so they buried him there. This is in contradiction to the Deobandi rulings that the grave must not be covered.

== Spiritual chain of succession ==
Shaykh Pir Fazal Ali Qureshi belongs to the Mujaddidi order of Sufism, which is the main branch of Naqshbandi Sufi tariqah. His spiritual lineage goes to Muhammad, through Shaikh Ahmad Sirhindi, the Mujaddid of eleventh Hijri century.

== Khulafa ==
He is said to have about 66 Khulafa, many of whom became prominent Shaikhs after his demise. The most famous of them was Khwaja Abdul Ghaffar Naqshbandi.

Khwaja Abdul Ghaffar and his brother Khwaja Abdul Sattar were both Khulafa of Pir Qureshi. Pir Qureshi once told Khwaja Abdul Ghaffar that I have never given Khilafat (Ijazah) to any two brothers before. You belong to such a family that if your elder brother (Mawlana Muhammad Ashraf) and your father (Mawlana Yar Muhammad) were alive, I would have given Khilafat to both of them.
