= Tafsir al-Mazhari =

Religious text by Qadi Thanaullah Panipati

- An all-collection of the Tafsir al-Mazhari
- Author: Qadi Thanaullah Panipati
- Original title: تفسير المظهري
- Language: Arabic
- Series: tafsir of the Qur'an
- Publisher: Nadwatul Musannifeen

Tafsir al-Mazhari (Arabic: تفسير المظهري) is a tafsir of the Qur'an, written by the Sunni Islamic scholar Qadi Thanaullah Panipati. The tafsir was published by Nadwatul Musannifeen.

== Overview ==
Tafsīr Mazhari was published by Nadwatul Musannifeen in ten volumes. It was later translated by Abd al-Dā'im Jalāli in to Urdu and published by Nadwatul Musannifeen in twelve volumes.

== See also ==
- List of Sunni books
