= Mussa Zai Sharif =

Coordinates: 31°40′56″N 70°21′47″E

Mussazai
- Town and union council
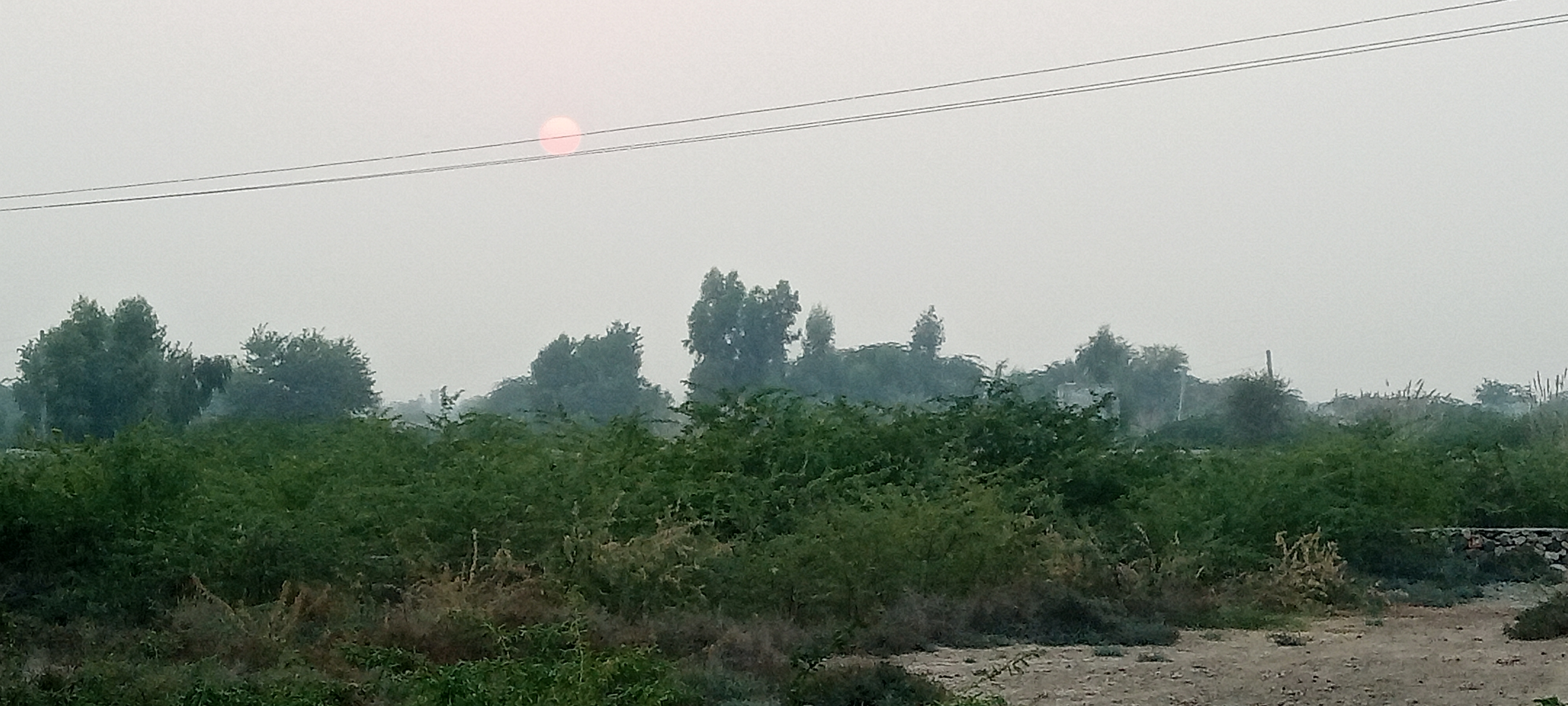
- Nature in Mussa Zai Sharif
- Interactive map of Mussazai
- Country: Pakistan
- Province: Khyber Pakhtunkhwa
- District: Dera Ismail Khan District
- Established: since 2006

Government

Population
  - Total: around 20,000
- Time zone: UTC+5 (PST)

Musazai sharif is a town and union council of Dera Ismail Khan District in Khyber Pakhtunkhwa province of Pakistan. It is located at 31°40'56N 70°21'47E and has an altitude of 216 metres (711 feet).

Musazai Sharif is about 65 km (40 miles) southwest of Dera Ismail Khan, it lies 7 kilometers south of Daraban Tehsil. Musazai is a small, peaceful town, fresh water streams criss-cross the village, abundant water and gardens give Musazai green looks. Musazai is famous all across Pakistan for its Naqshbandiyya Ahmadiyya Saeediya Monastery, which was founded by Khawaja Dost Muhammad Kandahari . Musazai is named after most powerful of miankhel tribes. History of Musazai is intertwined with that of Daraban, Or Draban. Currently in Musazai apart from Miankhels, Kheshgi Akhundzadah, Durani Achakzai, Machhankhel (Sheikh) and Faqir Sheikh also live.
