= Khwaja Abdul Ghaffar Naqshbandi =

Khwaja Abdul Ghaffar Fazali Naqshbandi (Sindhi: خواجه عبدالغفار نقشبندي) alias Pir Mitha (1880-1964) was a Naqshbandi Sufi of Sindh, Pakistan.

== Related Books ==
- Dīvān-e-Ghaffāriā (Urdu and Saraiki), Sufi poetry of Hazrat Pīr Mithā, published by Sāhibzādā Muhammad Deedah-Dil Ghaffārī, 2011, pages: 406
- Malfūzāt-e Fazaliā (Urdu), speeches of Hazrat Pīr Fazal Alī Qureshī, written by Hazrat Pīr Mithā, edited by Pīr Karamullāh Ilāhī alias Dilbar Sāeen, published in 1433 AH (2012), 530 pages. An old partial edition
- Malfūzat-e Ghaffāriā (Sindhi), by Muftī Abdur-Rahmān Allāhābādī, published by Idārat-ul-Ma’rifat, Allahabad sharif, Kandiaro, March 2010. 200 pages.
- Malfūzāt-e Ghaffārī (Sindhi), by Khalīfā Sa’adullāh Soomro, edited by Pīr Karamullāh Ilāhī alias Dilbar Sāeen, published in 1432 AH, 200 pages. Speeches of Hazrat Pīr Mithā.
- Noor-us-Sudoor (Sindhi), Malfūzāt of Hazrat Pīr Mithā, written by Maulānā Ghulām Farīd Ghaffārī, edited by Pīr Karamullāh Ilāhī alias Dilbar Sāeen, published in 1432 AH, 50 pages. Another link
- Hazrat Pīr Mithā Sāeen (Sindhi) comprehensive biography written by Pīr Karamullāh Ilāhī alias Dilbar Sāeen, published in 2010, 608 pages.
- Gulistān-e Ghaffāriā (Urdu), biography written by Bedar Morai, published in 2008, 144 pages.
- Ganjeena-e Hayāt-e Ghaffāriā (Sindhi), biography written by Bedar Morai, published in 1974, 150 pages.
- Tazkirāh Khulafā-e Ghaffāriā (Sindhi), by Pīr Karamullāh Ilāhī alias Dilbar Sāeen, published in 1431 AH. 826 pages. Biographies of one hundred khulafa of Hazrat Pīr Mithā and their spiritual descendants.
- Maktūbāt Ghaffāriā (Urdu), selected letters written by Hazrat Pīr Mithā.

== See also ==
- Sayyid Ghulam Hussain Shah Bukhari
- Naqshbandi Hussaini Golden Chain
