= Muhammad Sirajuddin Naqshbandi =

Islamic scholar (1879–1915)

- Born: 30 December 1879; Mussa Zai Sharif, Dera Ismail Khan, British India
- Died: 12 February 1915 (aged 35); Mussa Zai Sharif, Dera Ismail Khan, British India

Philosophical work
- Region: Islam
- School: Sunni Islam, Hanafi, Sufi, Naqshbandi

Muhammad Sirajuddin Naqshbandi (30 December 1879 – 12 February 1915) was a prominent Islamic scholar and Sufi shaikh of the Naqshbandi Sufi order in South Asia (present day Pakistan). He was born in 1879 and died in 1915 at Mussa Zai Sharif, Dera Ismail Khan. His legacy and influence are still widespread around the world in terms of his followers and his methodology.

== Biography ==
Born on 15 Muharram 1297 AH (30 December 1879) at Mussa Zai Sharif, Dera Ismail Khan (present day Pakistan), Muhammad Sirajuddin Naqshbandi was the son and successor of the famous Naqshbandi Sheikh Muhammad Usman Damani. He studied with Mullah Shah Muhammad and graduated at the age of fourteen. He took sulook (spiritual guidance) from his father and studied the books of tasawwuf such as the Maktubat (letters) of Imam Rabbani Shaykh Ahmed Sirhindi and the Maktubat (letters) of Khawaja Muhammad Masum. His father awarded him a khilafat (ijazah in Sufism) on 3 Dhū al-Qa‘dah 1311 AH (10 May 1894) and gave him a written ijazat-nama (sanad).

In 1324 AH, he went to Makkah and Madinah for the Muslim pilgrimage hajj and visited the Roza of the Islamic prophet Muhammad with thirty-six other companions. His companion, Haji Mullah Sadr, wrote that when Muhammad Sirajuddin Naqshbandi was visiting Madinah one day, the sheikh took a bath and then went to visit the grave of Muhammad. There he met with the Mujawirs (persons responsible for maintaining a shrine) and spoke with them. During this time the Mujawirs gave Muhammad Sirajuddin Naqshbandi an Arabic dress as well as a burning candle. Using the candle he lit two cressets and entered the Roza of the shrine of Muhammad while wearing the dress he was given. After praying for long while, he came out and expressed gratitude to the Mujawirs.

Sirajuddin awarded approximately thirty-six persons with khilafat. His most famous khalifa and successor was Pir Fazal Ali Qureshi - a prominent sheikh whose spiritual legacy is still active throughout the world.

At age thirty-five, Sirajuddin fell severely ill. Seeking help, he consulted with Hakim Ajmal Khan, but unfortunately was unable to recover and died as a result of his illness - pneumonia and fever - on Friday 26 Rabi al-Awwal 1333 AH (12 February 1915). He was buried alongside his father's grave at Mussa Zai Sharif in Dera Ismail Khan.

His letters, written to various persons, are published with an Urdu translation. The collection is part of the book in which letters of his father are also included.

== Spiritual chain of succession ==
Khwaja Sirajuddin Naqshbandi belongs to the Mujaddidi order of Sufism, which is the main branch of Naqshbandi Sufi tariqah. His spiritual lineage goes to Muhammad, through Sheikh Ahmad Sirhindi, the Mujaddid of the eleventh Hijri century.

== See also ==
- Muhammad Tahir
