= Mohammad Baba As-Samasi =

Uzbek Sufi (1195–1257)

- Born: 1195; Uzbekistan

Mohammad Baba as-Samasi (Urdu: محمد بابا السماسی ) was a Sufi of the Naqshbandi order. He was born in Sammas, a village on the outskirts of Ramitan, three miles (4.8 km) from Bukhara, Uzbekistan. He memorized the Qur'an and the hadith (sayings of Muhammad), and become an expert in jurisprudence, then studied speculative theology, logic, philosophy (‘ilm al-Kalam) and history. He followed Shaykh Ali Ramitani. Shaykh 'Ali Ramitani quddisa sirruhu chose him as his successor before his death and ordered all his disciples to follow him.
