= Mahmood Anjir Faghnawi =

Islamic philosopher (1231–1317)

Hazrat Khwāja Mahmood Anjir Faghnawi Naqshbandī (quddisa sirruhū)
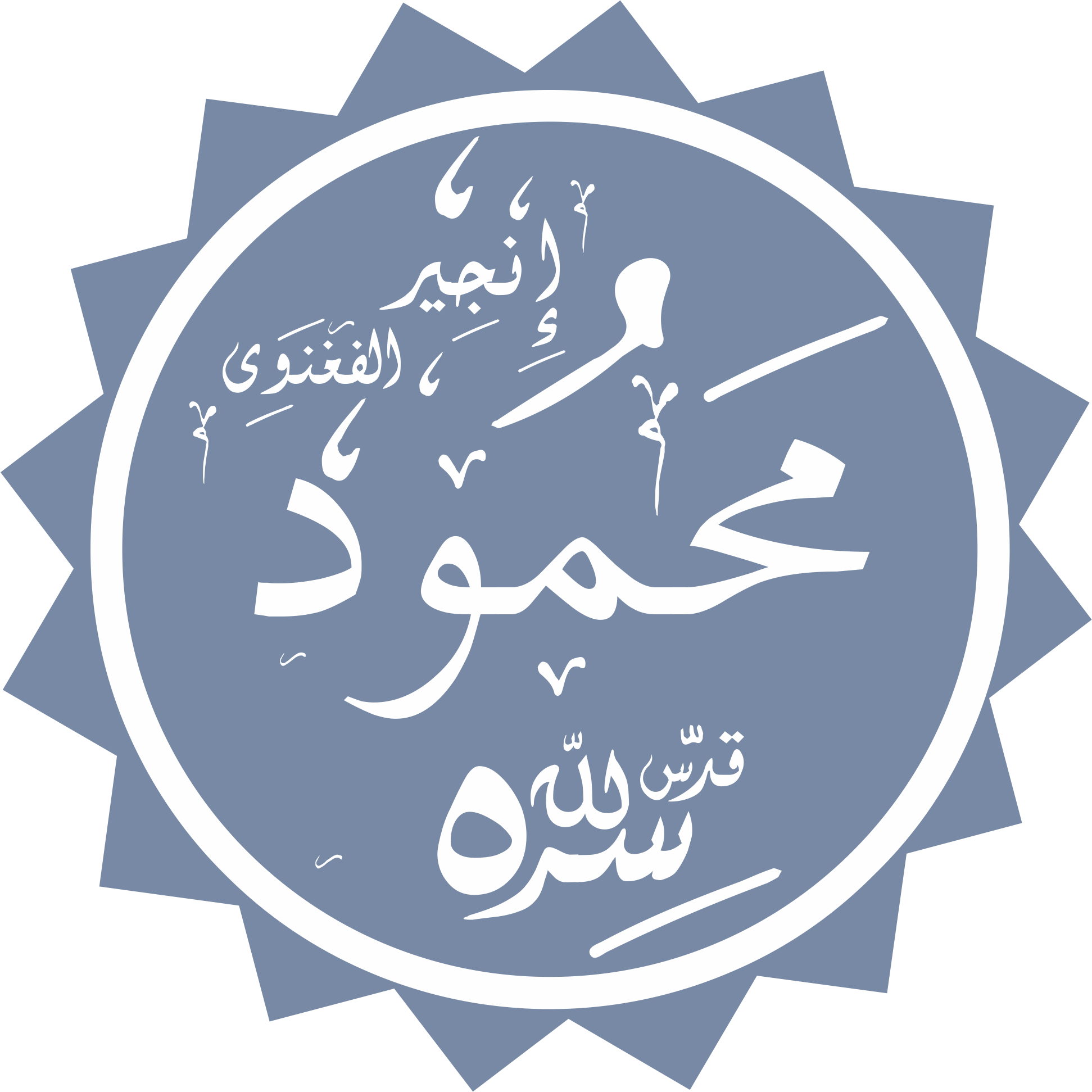
- Born: 18 Shawal 628 AH, 19 August 1231 CE; Mahmood Anjir; Bukhara, Uzbekistan
- Died: 17 Rabi al-Awal 717 AH, 30 May 1317 (aged 85)
- Family: Yahya Efendi (father)

Philosophical work
- School: Hanafi Maturidi
- Main interests: Implementation of Islamic Sacred Law
- Notable ideas: Evolution of Islamic philosophy, application of Sharia'h

Khwaja Mahmood al-Anjir al-Faghnawi was the 13th sheikh in the chain of the masters of the Naqshbandi Order, one of the largest Sufi Muslim orders.

== Birth ==
Mahmud Anjir Faghnawi was born in Bukhara, Uzbekistan. He was reported to have been from the lineage of Muhammad. He devoted his life to guiding people to Allah's presence.

== Biography ==
After he stayed for a short time in his village, he moved to Wabkent. There, he earned his livelihood as a builder. He started the training with Khaja Arif Riwgari, there completing his sayr-u suluk (spiritual training), and becoming his successor. For years he guided the people in the masjid of Wabkent and trained his students. It is said he was always smiling and his face was filled with light. During his last days, Arif Riwgari permitted Mahmood Anjir Faghnawi to perform dhikr, or devotional prayer. As a requirement of the times and in accordance with the state of his students, he spent most of his time performing dhikr.

== Death ==
Anjir Faghnawi died on 17 Rabi-ul-Awwal 717 AH (1317 CE). His tomb is located in the village of Anjirbag, in the suburb of Wabkent in Bukhara. Next to his tomb, there is a masjid and a well and it is believed that this water has healing properties.
