= Arif Riwgari =

Central Asian Sufi teacher

Khwaja Muhammad Arif Riwgari is the first of the group of Central Asian Sufi teachers known simply as Khajagan (the Masters) of the Naqshbandi Order. He is the 12th master in the chain of the Order. His shrine is at Riwgar, known as Shofirkon today, about 45 km north of Bukhara, Uzbekistan.

== Life ==
He was born in Riwgar and studied under the supervision of the master of his time, Khawaja Abdul Khaliq Ghajadwani. Khawaja Muhammad Arif was one of his four deputies. When Abdul Khaliq Ghajadwani died, his first deputy Khwāja Ahmad Siddīq succeeded him and took over the seat of spiritual directorship and trained the seekers in this noble path. When he was close to dying, he urged all his followers to seek the company of Khwaja Muhammad Arif Riwgari.

== Contribution ==
Arif Riwgari wrote a treatise on tasawwuf, called Ārif Nāma, and one of its manuscripts is located in the library of Khāniqāh Mūsā Zaī, district Dera Ismail Khan, Pakistan. At the end of his times, Arif Riwgari appointed Mahmud Anjir Faghnawi as his deputy and all his companions associated themselves with Mahmūd Faghnawī following his death.

== Death ==
Arif Riwgari died on 1st Shawwāl 616 AH (December 1219 CE). He was buried in his hometown Riwgar (Shafirkon, Bukhara, Uzbekistan), where his noble tomb is a place of blessings and is visited by many.

== Sources ==
- The Naqshbandi Order, Hamid Algar
- Wafayat al-A'yan, Ibn Khallikan

== Bibliography ==
- Hadhrāt al-Quds, by Shaykh Badr ad-Din Sirhindī
- http://maktabah.org/blog/?p=1507
- Rashahāt Ain al-Hayāt, by Mawlānā Alī ibn Husain Safī
