= Muhammad Usman Damani =

Islamic scholar (c.1828–1897)

- Born: 1828/1829; Looni, Tehsil Kulachi Dera Ismail Khan
- Died: 1897 (aged 68–69) ) Mussa Zai Sharif, Dera Ismail Khan, British India

Philosophical work
- Region: Islam
- School: Sunni Islam, Hanafi, Sufi, Naqshbandi

Muhammad Usman Damani was a prominent Muslim scholar and Sufi shaykh of Naqshbandi tariqah of the 19th century (1828–1897) in South Asia (present day Pakistan).

== Early life ==
He was born to Mawlana Moosa Jan in 1244 AH at Looni town in Kulachi Dera Ismail Khan District, present day Pakistan. His father belonged to the Damani tribe and his mother belonged to the family of the Indian Sufi saint Bande Nawaz. He was a khalifa and successor of Haji Dost Muhammad Qandhari, and was the successor of khanqah Mussa Zai Sharif in Dera Ismail Khan.

== Work ==
His shaykh awarded him with ijazah (khilafat) of eight Sufi orders, namely Naqshbandi Mujaddidi, Qadri, Chishti, Suhrawardi, Shattari, Madaria, Kibrawiya and Qalandari.

His letters are published in a collection named Tuhfa Zahidia with an Urdu translation. In the last years of his life, he did not take the oath of allegiance from newcomers and referred them to one of his two leading khulafa, namely Muhammad Sirajuddin Naqshbandi his son and Sayyad Laal Shah Hamdani.

He died on Tuesday 22 Shaban 1314 AH (26 January 1897) and was buried in Mussa Zai Sharif alongside the grave of his shaykh Haji Dost Muhammad Qandhari. His janazah prayer was led by his son Muhammad Sirajuddin Naqshbandi.

== Chain of succession ==
Khwaja Muhammad Usman Damani belonged to the Mujaddidi order of Sufism, which is the main branch of Naqshbandi Sufi tariqah. His spiritual lineage goes to Muhammad, through Shaikh Ahmad Sirhindi, the Mujaddid of eleventh Hijri century.

== Khulafa ==
- Muhammad Sirajuddin Naqshbandi, his son and successor (d. 1915)
- Sayyad Laal Shah Hamdani (d. 1896)
- Mawlana Shirazi
- Abdur-Rahman Bahadur Kilmi (d. 1922)

== See also ==
- Abu Hanifa
