= Ali Ramitani =

13th century Sufi religious leader

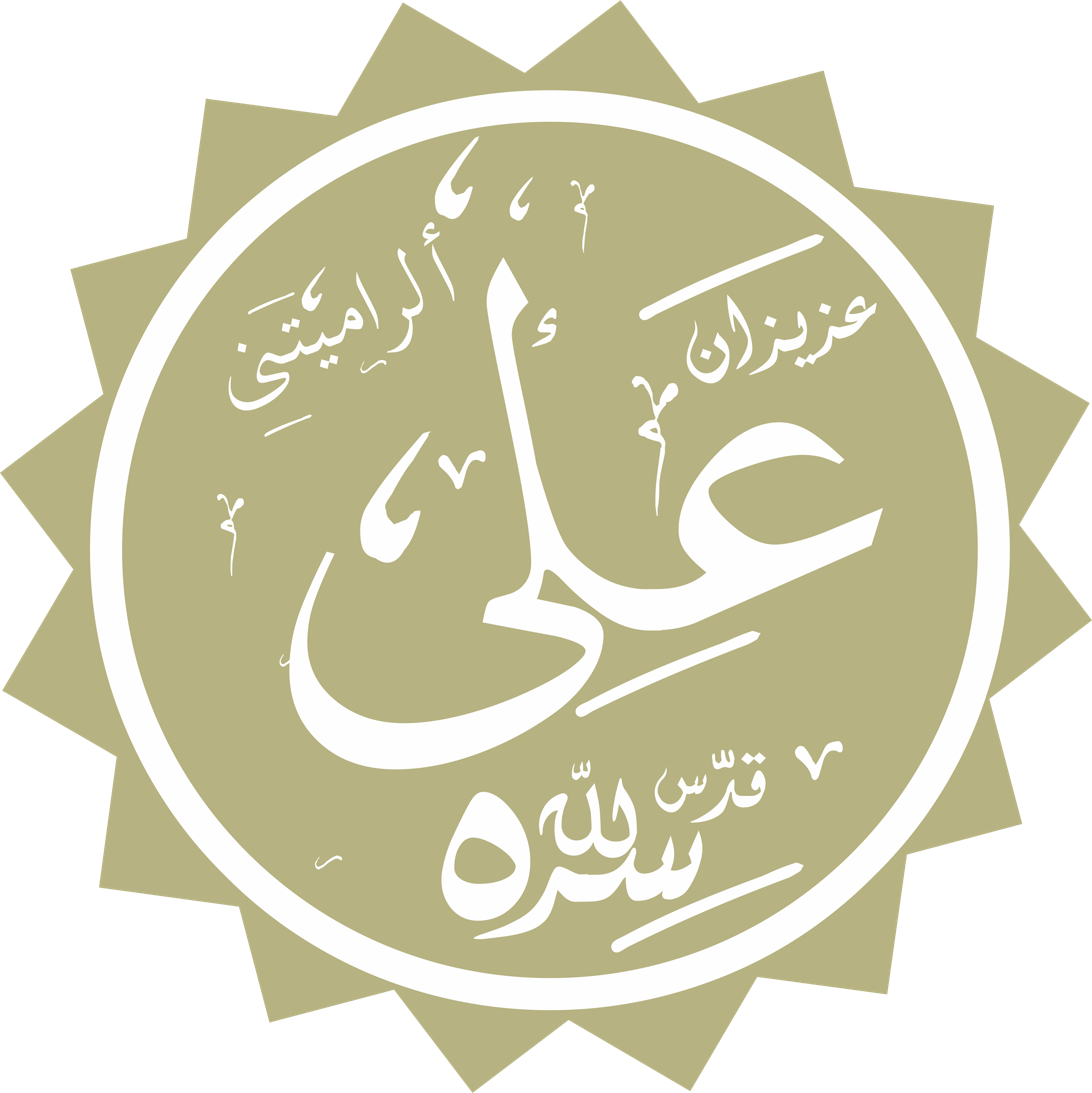
- Born: 1194; Uzbekistan
- Died: 1315 (aged 120–121)

Sheikh Ali Ramitani (Urdu عزیزان شیخ علی الرامتانی ) was born in the Ramitan area around Bukhara Uzbekistan. Due to his specialty in weaving cloth, Sheikh Ali Ramitani is often called Sheikh Nessac (weaver). After studying religious science, Sheikh Ali Ramitani conferred on Mahmood Anjir-Faghnawi quddisa sirruhu When Sheikh Mahmud Injir Faghnawi quddisa sirruhu was about to die, he handed over his ordination (tabligh) to Sheikh Ali Ramatini quddisa sirruhu followed by the observance of the other disciples.
