= Sha'ban =

Eighth month of the Islamic calendar

- Native name: شَعْبَان (Arabic)
- Calendar: Islamic calendar
- Month number: 8
- Number of days: 29–30 (depends on actual observation of the moon's crescent)
- Significant days: Shab-e-Barat

Shaʽban (Arabic: شَعْبَان Šaʿbān) is the eighth month of the Islamic calendar. It is called the month of 'separation', as the word means 'to disperse' or 'to separate' because the pre-Islamic Arabs used to disperse in search of water.

The fifteenth night of this month is Mid-Sha'ban, which coincides with the celebration of Shab-e-Barat in Muslim communities all over Asia.

Sha'ban is the last lunar month before Ramadan, and so Muslims determine in it when the first day of Ramadan fasting will be. In the second Hijri year (624 CE), fasting during Ramadan was made obligatory during this month.

In the post-Tanzimat Ottoman Empire context, the word was, in French, the main language of diplomacy and a common language among educated and among non-Muslim subjects, spelled Chaʼban. The current Turkish spelling today is Şâban.

== Virtues ==
The virtues of Sha'ban is mentioned in various traditions of the Islamic prophet Muhammad.

Aisha, the wife of Muhammad, narrated that "(she) did not see him fasting in any month more than in the month of Sha'ban," except Ramadan.

In another narration Muhammad said, "Do those deeds which you can do easily, as Allah will not get tired (of giving rewards) till you get bored and tired (of performing religious deeds)."

== Timing ==
The Islamic calendar is a lunar calendar, and months begin when the first crescent of a new moon is sighted. Since the Islamic lunar calendar year is 11 to 12 days shorter than the solar year, Sha'ban migrates throughout the seasons. The estimated start and end dates for Sha'ban, based on the Umm al-Qura calendar of Saudi Arabia, are:

Sha'ban dates between 2024 and 2028
AH	First day (CE/AD)	Last day (CE/AD)
1445	11 February 2024	10 March 2024
1446	31 January 2025	28 February 2025
1447	20 January 2026	17 February 2026
1448	10 January 2027	7 February 2027
1449	29 December 2027	27 January 2028
1450	17 December 2028	15 January 2029

== Islamic events ==
- 01 Sha'ban, birth of Zaynab bint Ali
- 02 Sha'ban, death of (Imam Azam) Abu Hanifa
- 03 Sha'ban, birth of Husayn ibn Ali
- 04 Sha'ban, birth of Abbas ibn Ali
- 05 Sha'ban, birth of Ali ibn Husayn
- 05 Sha'ban, death of Fizza, the hand-maiden (Qaneez) of Fatimah
- 07 Sha'ban, birth of Qasim ibn Hasan
- 11 Sha'ban, birth of Ali al-Akbar ibn Husayn
- 15 Sha'ban, holiday known as Laylat al-Bara'at or Nisfu Sha'ban; birth of Muhammad al-Mahdi
- 21 Sha'ban, death of Lal Shahbaz Qalandar
- 22 Sha'ban, death of Muhammad Usman Damani
- 27 Sha'ban, death of Sayyad Laal Shah Hamdani

== See also ==
- Maahefun
