= Shawwal =

Tenth month of the Islamic calendar

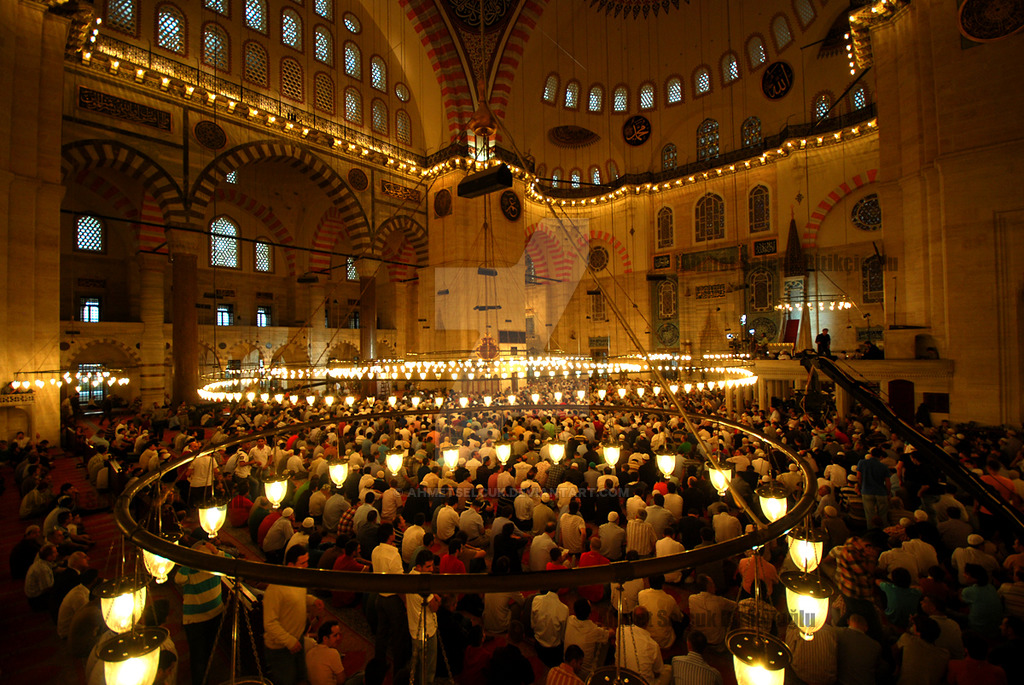
- Eid al-Fitr prayer, Suleymaniye Mosque, Istanbul
- Native name: شَوَّال (Arabic)
- Calendar: Islamic calendar
- Month number: 10
- Number of days: 29–30 (depends on actual observation of the moon's crescent)
- Significant days: Eid al-Fitr

Shawwal (Arabic: شَوَّال, romanized: Shawwāl) is the tenth month of the Islamic calendar. It comes after Ramadan and before Dhu'l-Qa'da.

Shawwāl stems from the Arabic verb shāla (شَالَ), which means to 'lift or carry', generally to take or move things from one place to another.

== Fasting during Shawwāl ==
The first day of Shawwāl is Eid al-Fitr; fasting is prohibited. Some Muslims observe six days of optional fasting during Shawwāl beginning the day after Eid al-Fitr since fasting is prohibited on this day. These six days of fasting together with the Ramadan fasts are equivalent to fasting all year round. The reasoning behind this tradition is that a good deed in Islam is rewarded 10 times, hence fasting 30 days during Ramadan and 6 days during Shawwāl is equivalent to fasting the whole year in fulfillment of this obligation.

The Shia scholars of the Ja'fari school do not place any emphasis on the six days being consecutive, while among the Sunnis, the majority of Shafi`i scholars consider it recommended to fast these days consecutively. They based this on a hadith related by Tabarani and others, wherein Muhammad is reported to have said, "Fasting six consecutive days after Eid al-Fitr is like fasting the entire year." Other traditional scholarly sources among the Hanafiyya and Hanbaliyya do not place an emphasis on consecutive days, while the strongest opinion of the Malikiyya prefers any six days of the month, consecutively or otherwise.

== Timing ==
The Islamic calendar is a purely lunar calendar, and its months begin when the first crescent of a new moon is sighted. Since the Islamic lunar year is 11 to 12 days shorter than the solar year, Shawwāl migrates throughout the seasons. The estimated start and end dates for Shawwāl, based on the Umm al-Qura calendar of Saudi Arabia, are:

Shawwāl dates between 2024 and 2028
| AH | First day (CE/AD) | Last day (CE/AD) |
|---|---|---|
| 1445 | 10 April 2024 | 8 May 2024 |
| 1446 | 30 March 2025 | 28 April 2025 |
| 1447 | 20 March 2026 | 17 April 2026 |
| 1448 | 9 March 2027 | 7 April 2027 |
| 1449 | 26 February 2028 | 26 March 2028 |

== Islamic events ==
Shawwāl begins with Eid al-Fitr and includes a number of significant historical and religious events observed by Muslims around the world.

- Every 1st day of Shawwāl, Eid al-Fitr is celebrated throughout the Muslim World for the first three days of this month (but celebrations last until the 29th/30th day as per the festive season's duration).
- 7 Shawwāl 3 AH, early Muslims took part in the Battle of Uhud.
- 10 Shawwal, birth of Ahmed Raza Khan.
- 13 Shawwāl, primary traditionist of the Sunni Muslims, Muhammad al-Bukhari, was born in 194 AH.
- 18 Shawwal, urs of Sufi Mystic And Poet Amir Khusro.
- 22 Shawwāl 1284 AH, death of Haji Dost Muhammad Qandhari, an Afghan Sufi master of Naqshbandi tradition.
- 25 Shawwāl 148 AH, martyrdom of Imām Ja‘far as-Sādiq.

== See also ==
- Sitta min Shawwāl
