= Mirza Mazhar Jan-e-Janaan =

Indian author

Mirzā Mazhar Jān-i Jānān

Personal life
- Born: 11th Ramadan, 1111 A.H/ 13 March 1699 Mughal Empire
- Died: 10th Muharram, 1195 A.H/ 6 January 1781 (aged 81)

Religious life
- Religion: Islam
- Denomination: Sunni
- Jurisprudence: Hanafi
- Tariqa: Naqshbandi
- Creed: Maturidi
- Profession: Islamic scholar, Sufi

Muslim leader
- Influenced by: Bahauddin Naqshband, Ahmad Sirhindi
- Influenced: Shah Ghulam Ali Dehlavi, Qadi Thanaullah Panipati, Shah Waliullah Dehlawi, Ibn Abidin, Mahmud al-Alusi

Mirzā Mazhar Jān-i Jānān (Urdu: مرزا مظہر جانِ جاناں), also known by his laqab Shamsuddīn Habībullāh (13 March 1699 – 6 January 1781), was a renowned Hanafi Maturidi Naqshbandī Sufi poet of Delhi, distinguished as one of the "four pillars of Urdu poetry." He was also known to his contemporaries as the sunnītarāsh, "Sunnicizer", for his absolute, unflinching commitment to and imitation of the Sunnah.

== Birth and early life ==
The date of birth is variously given as 1111 or 1113 A.H, and it took place in Kālā Bāgh, Mālwa, according to one source, while according to another source he was born in Agra. Shaikh Muhammad Tahir Bakhshi notes his date of birth as 11th Ramadan 1111 AH. He was born into a noble family of Alvi Syed Awan parentage that served in the administration of the Mughals. His father Mirzā Jān was employed in the army of the mighty Mughal Emperor Aurangzeb. Following a custom according to which the Emperor had the right to name the sons of his officers, Aurangzeb is reported to have said:

"A son is the soul of his father. Since the name of his father is Mirzā Jān, the name of the son will be Jān-i Jānān."

His early religious instruction was entrusted to hājjī Afzal Siyālkōtī (hadith) and hāfiz Abd al-Rasūl Dihlawī (Qur'an). At the age of 18, he joined the Naqshbandī order under Nūr Muhammad Bada'ūni, who was closely connected to the teachings of Shaykh Ahmad Sirhindī, and completed his studies in four years. He was also initiated in the Qādirī, Chishtī and Suhrawardī orders.

In his prime, Mazhar was advised to write poetry in Urdu rather than Persian as the days of the latter language were said to be numbered in India. Besides authoring poetry and polemics, Mazhar also wrote a large number of letters relating to Sufi thought and practice.

== Legacy and influence ==
Among his 'disciples' or Muridin was the Hanafī scholar, Qādī Thanāullāh Panipatī, who wrote a famous Tafsir of the Qur'an by the name Tafsir-i Mazharī, which he named after his teacher. Also in his spiritual lineage (silsila) came the great Hanafī jurist Imam Ibn 'Abidīn and the Qur'an exegete Allāma al-Alusī.

He founded a sub-order within the Naqshbandi Tariqa known as the Naqshbandiyya Mazhariyya. Mazhar authorized more disciples than any of his predecessors. He regularly corresponded with his deputies, and his letters form much of the basis of our knowledge about his life and ideas.

He was succeeded by his khalifa (deputy) Abdullah alias Shah Ghulam Ali Dahlavi, who is considered Mujaddid of the 13th Islamic century by most Naqshbandi followers today. His tariqah spread to whole India and Middle East.

== Death ==
Mirzā Mazhar was shot and seriously injured on the 7th of Muharram, of the year 1195 AH/1780 CE. The author of Āb-i Ḥayāt writes:

"The cause of this murder was widely rumored in Delhi among high and low: that according to custom, on the seventh day [of Muḥarram], the standards were carried aloft [in procession]. Mirzā Mazhar sat by the side of the road in the upper veranda of his house, with some of his special disciples. Just as ordinary barbarous people do, his [Sunni] group and the [Shia] procession group may perhaps have hurled some insults and abuse, and some barbarous person was offended. Among them was one stony-hearted person named Faulād [=steel] Ḳhān, who was extremely barbarous. He did this evil deed. But Ḥakīm Qudratullāh Ḳhān 'Qāsim', in his anthology, says that in his poetry Mirzā Sahib used to compose a number of verses in praise of Hazrat ʿAlī, and some Sunni took this amiss and did this evil deed.

The author of Āb-i Ḥayāt, a determined Shi'a, has been suspected of indulging in partisan religious bias. Professor Frances Pritchett has noted that the latter account of the death of Mirzā Mazhar in Āb-i Ḥayāt is a deliberate distortion. Professor Friedmann, as well as Annemarie Schimmel and Itzchad Weismann, have all noted that Mirzā Mazhar was killed by a Shi'ite zealot.

Most of his Urdu biographers have also written that he was killed by a gunshot by a Shi'ite on 7th Muharram, and he died on 10th Muharram 1195 AH.

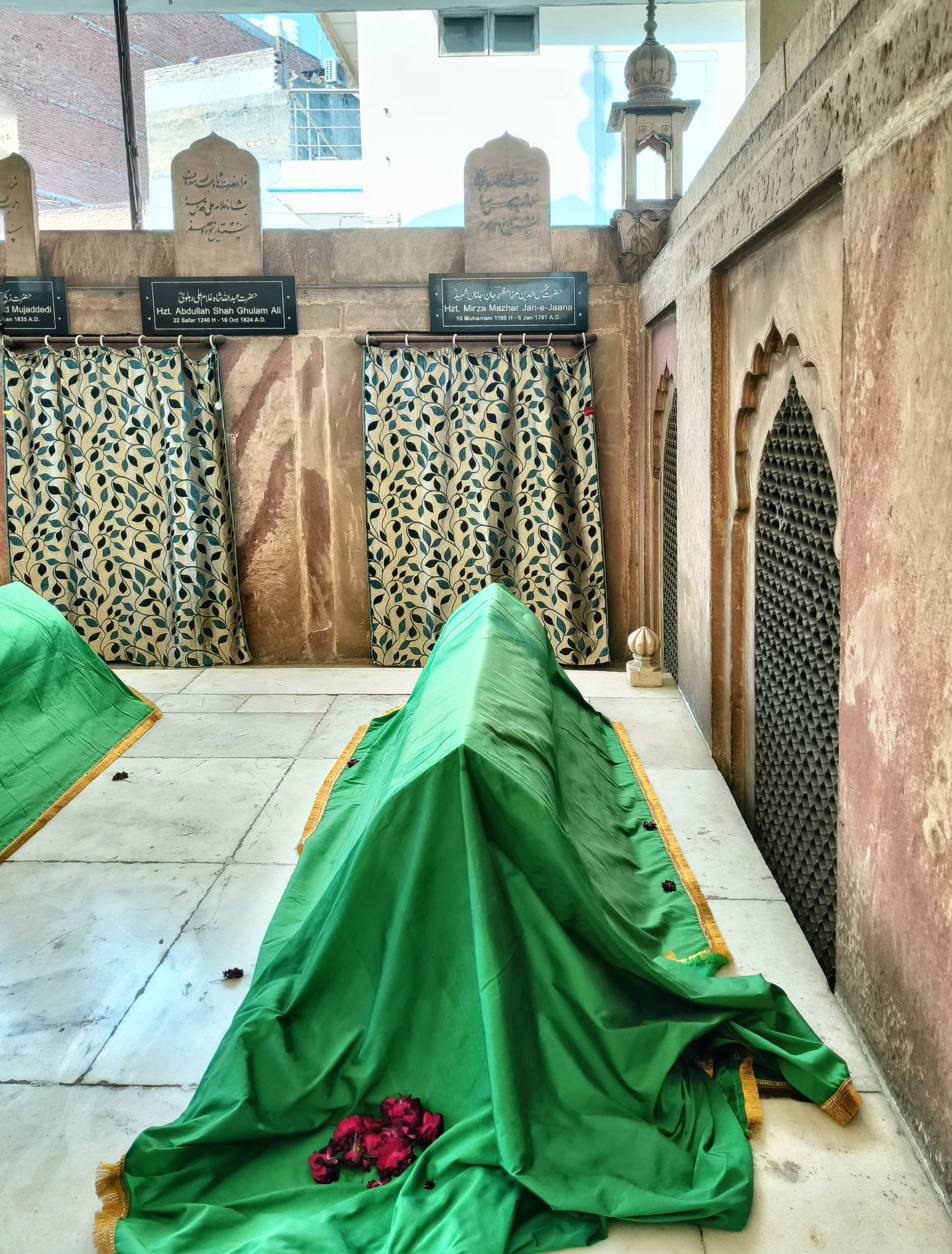
Tomb of Mirza Mazhar Jan-e-Janaan

== Spiritual Chain of Succession ==
Mirza Mazhar belonged to the Mujaddidi sect of Sufism, which is a main branch of Naqshbandi Sufi Tariqa. His spiritual lineage goes through Shaikh Ahmad Sirhindi, the Mujaddid of eleventh Hijri century.

== Khulafa ==
In Maqamat Mazhari, his foremost Khalifa and successor Shah Ghulam Ali Dahlwai writes short biographies of many of his Khulafa (deputies). Among them were:

1. Qadi Thanaullah Panipati, author of Tafsir Mazhari and other notable Islamic books, descendant of Usman the third caliph of Islam
2. Mawlana FadalUllah, elder brother of Qadi Thanaullah Panipati
3. Mawlana AhmadUllah, eldest son of Qadi Thanaullah Panipati, famous for his braveness and fighting skills
4. Wife of Qadi Thanaullah Panipati
5. Shah NaimUllah Bahraichi Naqshbandi author of Mamoolaat-e- Mazhariya, Basharaat-e- Mazhariya (Hand written copy in British Museum India office London.
6. Shah Abdul Ghani Mujadidi
7. Maulvi Kalim Faruqi, scholar of Hadith and founder of the Maulvi family in Sylhet

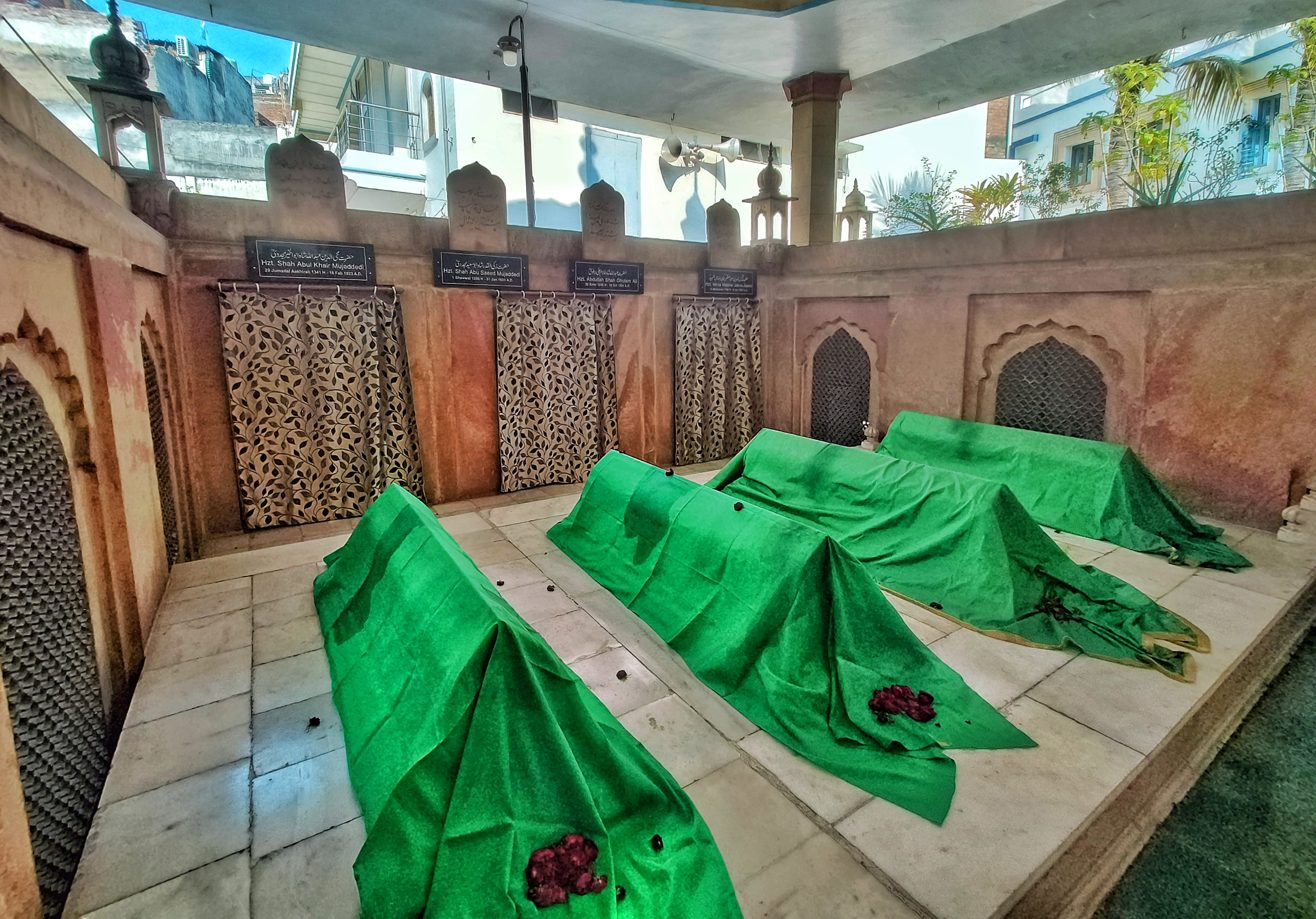
(Mausoleum)

== See also ==
- Urdu poetry
- List of Urdu language poets
