= Jumada II =

Sixth month of the Islamic calendar

- Native name: جُمَادَى ٱلثَّانِيَة (Arabic); جُمَادَى ٱلْآخِرَة (Arabic)
- Calendar: Islamic calendar
- Month number: 6
- Number of days: 29–30 (depends on actual observation of the moon's crescent)

Jumada II (Arabic: جُمَادَى ٱلثَّانِيَة, romanized: Jumādā th-Thāniya, (Note: Arabic pronunciation: [d͡ʒuˈmaːda‿θˈθaːnija].) lit. 'Jumada the Second', more commonly called جُمَادَى ٱلْآخِرَة, Jumādā l-ʾĀkhira, (Note: Arabic pronunciation: [d͡ʒuˈmaːda‿lˈʔaːxira].) lit. 'Jumada the Last') (Note: Less commonly جُمَادَى ٱلْآخِر Jumādā l-ʾĀkhir.) is the sixth month of the Islamic calendar. The word jamād (جماد), from which the name of the month is derived, is used to denote dry, parched land, a land devoid of rain. Jumādā (جمادى) may also be related to a verb meaning 'to freeze', and another account relates that water would freeze in pre-Islamic Arabia during this time of year.

== Timing ==
The Islamic calendar is a purely lunar calendar, and months begin when the first crescent of a new moon is sighted. Since the Islamic lunar year is 11 to 12 days shorter than the solar year, Jumada II migrates throughout the seasons. The estimated start and end dates for Jumada II are as follows (based on the Umm al-Qura calendar of Saudi Arabia):

Jumada II dates between 2024 and 2028
AH	First day (CE/AD)	Last day (CE/AD)
1445	14 December 2023	12 January 2024
1446	3 December 2024	31 December 2024
1447	22 November 2025	20 December 2025
1448	11 November 2026	9 December 2026
1449	31 October 2027	28 November 2027
1450	19 October 2028	17 November 2028

== Islamic events ==
- 3 Jumada II, death of Muhammad's daughter Fatima in 11 AH.
- 3 Jumada II, death of Harun al-Rashid, the fifth Abbasid caliph.
- 10 Jumada II, victory of Ali in the Battle of the Camel.
- 13 Jumada II, death of Umm al-Banin (the mother of Abbas ibn Ali).
- 20 Jumada II, birth of Muhammad's daughter Fatima Zahra.
- 22 Jumada II, death of Caliph Abu Bakr.
- 25 Jumada II of 564 AH, Saladin became amir of Egypt.

== See also ==
- Jumada I
