= Muhammad Tahir =

Pakistani sufi saint (born 1963)

Muhammad Tahir Bakhshi Naqshbandi
- Born: March 21, 1963 (age 63); Rahmatpur, Larkana, Pakistan

Philosophical work
- Region: Islamic scholar/Sufi
- School: Sunni Islam, Hanafi, Sufi, Naqshbandi

Khwaja Muhammad Tahir Bakhshi Naqshbandi (Urdu: خواجہ محمد طاہر بخشی نقشبندی; Sindhi: خواجه محمد طاهر بخشي نقشبندي, born 1963), also known as Sajjan Saeen (Urdu: سجن سائیں, Sindhi: سڄڻ سائين), is a prominent Naqshbandi Sufi shaykh in Pakistan. He was born on March 21, 1963, at dargah Rahmatpur Sharif, district Larkana, Pakistan.

He is the current head (Murshid) of a Naqshbandi Tariqa emanating from Ahmad Sirhindi, and the custodian of the shrine at Allahabad Sharif. He is also patron-in-chief of Jamaat Islah-ul-Muslimeen, Rohani Talaba Jamaat and Jamiyat-e-Ulema Tahiriya. He has more than 300 deputies (Khulafa') who are dedicated to spreading the Naqshbandi message across the world.
