= Khawaja =

Honorific title in some cultures

Khawaja (Persian: خواجه, romanized: khwāja) (Note: Classical Persian: خواجه khwāja; Dari khājah; Tajik khoja; modern Iranian reading: khāje.) is an honorific title used across the Middle East, South Asia, Southeast Asia and Central Asia, particularly towards Sufi teachers.

It is also used by Kashmiri Muslims and Mizrahi Jews—particularly Kurdish Jews. Usually, the title was given in the Arabic-speaking world to non-Muslim dignitaries, usually to Jews or Christians.

The Persian word khwāja roughly translates to 'Lord' or 'Master'. It comes from an Indo-Aryan Prakrit loanword uvaǰǰhāa, via a local reflex in the language of Kashgar, meaning 'Master', as derived by P. Pelliot; according to Garnik Asatrian, although Iranian etymologies have been proposed, it is more likely from a Prakrit root.

The Ottoman Turkish pronunciation of the Persian khwāja gave rise to hodja and its equivalents such as hoca in modern Turkish, hoxha in Albanian, խոջա (xoǰa) in Armenian, xoca (khoja) in Azerbaijani, hodža/хоџа in Bosnian, ходжа (khodzha) in Bulgarian and Russian, χότζας (chótzas) in Greek, and hoge in Romanian.

Other spellings include khaaja (Bengali) and koja (Javanese). The term has been rendered into English in various forms since the 1600s, including hodgee, hogi, cojah and khoja.

The name is also used in Egypt and Sudan to indicate a person with a foreign nationality or foreign heritage.

== Gallery ==
Hodja of Shkodra, from Les costumes populaires de la Turquie en 1873, published under the patronage of the Ottoman Imperial Commission for the 1873 Vienna World's Fair

Hodja of Salonika, today's Thessaloniki (first on the right, with the Hakham Bashi of Salonika on the left and a Monastir town dweller in the middle), from Les costumes populaires de la Turquie en 1873, published under the patronage of the Ottoman Imperial Commission for the 1873 Vienna World's Fair

== See also ==
- Khwaja Khizr Tomb at Sonipat
- Afaq Khoja Mausoleum in Kashgar
- Khwajagan, a network of Sufis in Central Asia from the 10th to the 16th century who are often incorporated into later Naqshbandi hierarchies.
- Khajeh Nouri (Or Khajenouri), a Persian family belonging to pre-revolution nobility, their family tree can be traced back 45 generations.
- Khojaly, a town in Azerbaijan.
- Khoja (Turkestan), a title of the descendants of the Central Asian Naqshbandi Sufi teacher, Ahmad Kasani
- Hoca, Turkish spelling of Khawaja
- Hoxha, Albanian surname
- Hodžić, Bosniak surname
- Koya, a medieval Indian administrative position
