= Rabi I =

Third month of the Islamic calendar

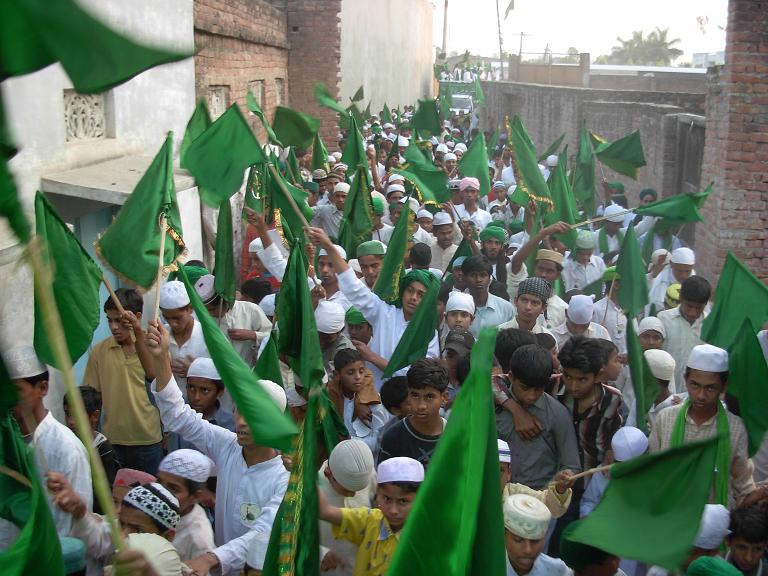
- Indian Muslims with green flags for Mawlid
- Native name: رَبِيع الْأَوَّل (Arabic)
- Calendar: Islamic calendar
- Month number: 3
- Number of days: 29–30 (depends on actual observation of the moon's crescent)
- Significant days: Mawlid

Rabi I (Arabic: رَبِيع الْأَوَّل, romanized: Rabīʿ al-ʾAwwal, (Note: Arabic pronunciation: [raˈbiːʕ alˈʔawwal].) lit. 'Rabi the First') (Note: Less commonly رَبِيع الْأُولَى Rabīʿ al-ʾŪlā.) is the third month of the Islamic calendar. The name Rabīʿ al-ʾAwwal means 'the first spring', referring to its position in the pre-Islamic Arabian calendar.

== Meaning ==
In Arabic, the word rabīʿ means "spring" and al-ʾawwal means "the first", so Rabīʿ al-ʾAwwal means "the first spring". The name seems to have to do with the celebratory events in the month, as spring marks the end of winter (a symbol of sadness) and consequently the start of happiness. As the Islamic calendar is a purely lunar calendar, the month naturally rotates over solar years, so Rabi I can fall in spring or any other season. Therefore, the month cannot be related to the actual season of spring.

And it's mentioned in the Arabic lexicons that Arabs add the word "month" to Rabi I, Rabi II and Ramadan months only, and most of them allow adding the word "month" to the other months too.

== Mawlid ==
Mawlid (Arabic: مولد) is an annual festival commemorating the birthday of the Islamic prophet Muhammad on the date of 12 Rabi I, the third month of the Islamic calendar.

The Muslim general Gökböri, a deputy of Saladin (r. 1174–1193), is believed to have been the first to publicly celebrate Mawlid, which he did in an impressive ceremony at the Prophet's Mosque in Medina. The Ottomans under Sultan Murad III (r. 1574–1595) declared it an official holiday.

Celebrants hold mahfils on Mawlid in which religious poetry is recited in praise of Muhammad accompanied by a feast. Other customs affiliated with Mawlid are supererogatory fasting, prayer and dhikr.

Mawlid observance is a recognized national holiday in most Muslim-majority countries of the world. It is generally approved by the Hanafi, Maliki and Shafi'i schools of Sunni Islam, as well as by Shia Muslims. However, Salafism and Wahhabism regard celebration of the Mawlid a reprehensible bid'a (innovation) and prohibit its observance. Deobandi jurists take an intermediate position, viewing the matter as an issue of Ikhtilaf (scholarly disagreement).

== Timing ==
The Islamic calendar is a purely lunar calendar, and months begin when the first crescent of a new moon is sighted. Since the Islamic lunar year is 11 to 12 days shorter than the solar year, Rabi I migrates throughout the seasons. The estimated start and end dates for Rabi I are as follows (based on the Umm al-Qura calendar of Saudi Arabia):

Rabi I dates between 2024 and 2028
AH	First day (CE/AD)	Last day (CE/AD)	Mawlid date (CE/AD)
1446	4 September 2024	3 October 2024	15 September 2024
1447	24 August 2025	22 September 2025	4 September 2025
1448	14 August 2026	11 September 2026	25 August 2026
1449	3 August 2027	1 September 2027	14 August 2027
1450	23 July 2028	21 August 2028	3 August 2028

== Islamic events ==
Masjid al-Quba, the first mosque, was built in this month.

- 1 Rabi I 897 AH, the fall of the Emirate of Granada, the final Muslim kingdom of al-Andalus
- 8 Rabi I, death of Imam Hassan Al-Askari Twelver Imām, Hasan al-‘Askarī (see: Chup Tazia)
- 9 Rabi I, Eid e shuja
- 12 Rabi I, Sunni Muslims observe Mawlid in commemoration of Muhammad's birthday
- 13 Rabi I, Death of Umm Rubab (beloved wife of Imam Hussain)
- 17 Rabi I, Shia celebrate the birthday of the Imām Ja‘far al-Sādiq.
- 18 Rabi I, birth of Umm Kulthum bint Ali
- 26 Rabi I 1333 AH, death of Khwaja Sirajuddin Naqshbandi, a Naqshbandi Sufi shaykh

Other events:

- The Hijra (migration) took place in this month
- Eid-e-Zahra (a.k.a. Eid e shuja), a celebration of Shi‘ah Muslims
- Marriage of Muhammad to Khadijah bint Khuwaylid
- Building of the Quba Mosque (first mosque in Islam)
- The week including 12th and 17th is called Islamic Unity Week in Iran to address both Sunni and Shia views on the birth date of Muhammad.
