= Ismail Sirajuddin Shirvani =

- İsmayıl Siracəddin Şirvani
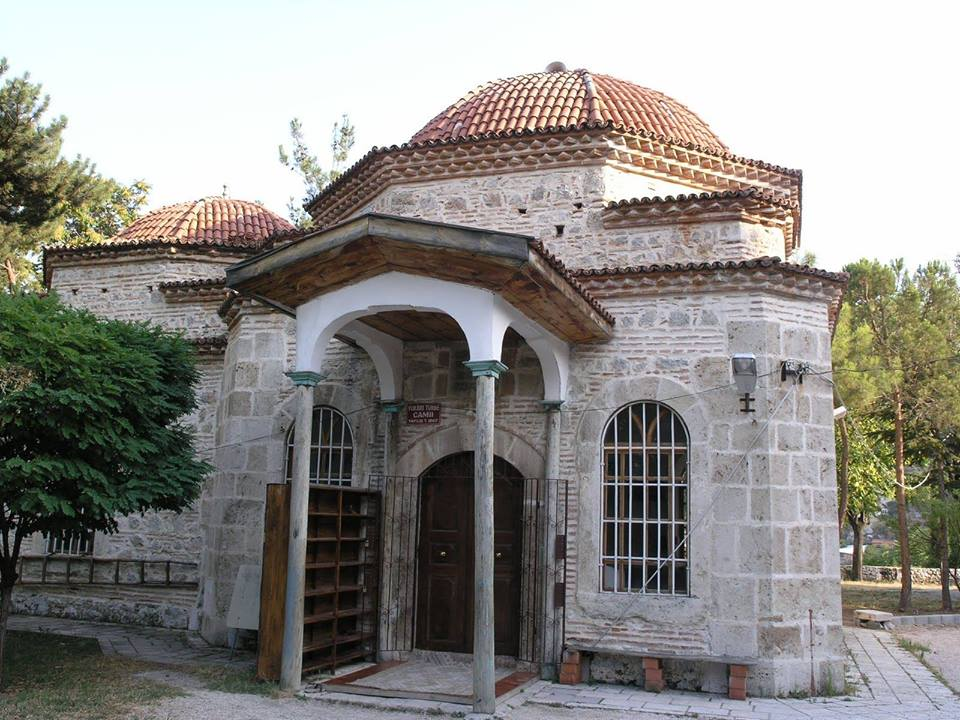
- Tomb of Ismail Shirvani in Amasya
- Title: Sheikh, Mawlana

Personal life
- Born: Ismail (also known as Zebîhullâh); 1782 or 1783 Kurdamir, Shirvan Khanate
- Died: 1848 (aged 65–66) Amasya, Ottoman Empire
- Buried: Shrine of Ismail Shirvani, Amasya
- Children: Abdulhamid Efendi; Şirvanlı Mehmed Rüşdi Pasha; Ahmed Hulusi Efendi; Mustafa Nuri Bey; Hacı Şerife Fatma Hanım
- Parent: Ahmed Shirvani (father)
- Known for: Spreading the Naqshbandi-Khalidi order in the Caucasus

Religious life
- Religion: Sunni Islam
- Order: Naqshbandi

Mawlana Ismail Sirajuddin al-Kurdamiri ash-Shirvani (Mövlanə İsmayıl Siracəddin əl-Kürdəmiri əş-Şirvani; 1782/1783 – 1848), often known as Ismail Sirajuddin Shirvani, was a prominent 19th-century Islamic scholar, philosopher, and Naqshbandi sheikh. He played a crucial role in introducing and spreading the Khalidi branch of the Naqshbandi order throughout the Caucasus and the Ottoman Empire. His followers were highly influential in the spiritual and political life of the region, significantly shaping the Caucasian resistance against the Russian Empire.

== Early life and education ==
Ismail Shirvani was born in 1782 or 1783 (Hijri 1197) in the village of Kurdamir, part of the Bölüket mahal in the Shirvan Khanate. His full name in the sources is recorded as Mawlana Ismail ibn Ahmed, indicating his father's name was Ahmed. Historical sources provide no further definitive information about his father's identity; some modern researchers have tentatively proposed that he may have been the figure known as Sheikh Anwar Shirvani. In some sources he is also referred to by the name Zebîhullâh. He is described in historical sources as having been tall and well-built, with black eyes and a loud voice. He came from a family line known for its scholars. His epithet "Sirajuddin" translates to "lamp of religion," and he was commonly referred to as "al-Kurdamiri" and "ash-Shirvani" based on his origins.

He began his early education in Shamakhi under the tutelage of Mehmet Nuri Efendi, where he studied Arabic and classical Islamic texts including Jami. In 1801, he traveled to Erzincan to further his studies under the famous scholar Awliyazade Abdurrahman Efendi, from whom he received his diploma (ijazah). He subsequently traveled to Tokat for a period, and then to Baghdad, where he studied Islamic jurisprudence (fiqh) under Sheikh Yahya Marwazi al-Imadi and philosophy (hikmah) under Molla Mohammad ibn Adam. In 1805, he moved to Burdur to continue studying fiqh, where he also taught local students. He returned to his homeland in 1806, spending seven years teaching Islamic sciences at a madrasa in Kurdamir.

== The Naqshbandi Order ==
In 1813 Shirvani embarked on the Hajj pilgrimage, visiting Mecca, Medina, and Jerusalem before arriving in Constantinople. Seeking a spiritual guide (murshid) to elevate his esoteric knowledge, he initially set out on foot toward India to become a disciple of the renowned Sufi mystic Abdullah ad-Dahlawi. He reached Basra, but according to tradition, he received a spiritual sign directing him to seek out Sheikh Khalid al-Baghdadi in Damascus instead.

He joined Mawlana Khalid al-Baghdadi and entered his spiritual training, remaining by his side from 1813 to 1817, and completed his spiritual journey (seyrüsülük) there. During his training, his spiritual master ordered him to enter a retreat (halvet) and perform menial tasks, such as cleaning toilets, to teach him humility and to view himself as lower than others. Recognizing Shirvani's spiritual capability, Mawlana Khalid granted him oral permission to guide followers upon his return to Shirvan in 1817, but his formal written diploma of succession (ijazah) was officially dated in 1821, four years after his return. Shirvani holds the distinction of being the only deputy (khalifa) directly sent to the Caucasus by Khalid al-Baghdadi.

== Return to Shirvan and exile ==
Upon returning to Kurdamir, Shirvani resumed a humble life, tending to his family's mulberry orchard, raising silkworms, and farming. He married during this period and had his first son, Abdulhamid Efendi. He established a Naqshbandi school and began initiating followers into the order, preaching asceticism, detachment from worldly wealth, and devotion to God. His reputation spread rapidly, attracting scholars from neighboring regions. Notably, a student from Dagestan named Khass Muhammed Shirvani became his disciple; Khass Muhammed then returned to Dagestan and facilitated the entry of his own teacher, Muhammad Yaraghi, into Shirvani's order.

During the 1820s the Russian Empire began systematically persecuting influential religious figures in the region, viewing the Naqshbandi network as a threat to Russian colonial interests. Russian authorities arrested and exiled several of Shirvani's deputies. Initially, Shirvani was protected from exile through the intervention of Fatma Begüm, the wife of Mustafa Khan of Shirvan However, under intense, continued pressure from the Russian administration, Shirvani was forced to leave his homeland in 1826, migrating to Akhaltsikhe, which was then within the borders of the Ottoman Empire.

Shirvani initially settled in Akhaltsikhe, where he continued teaching Islamic sciences and spreading the Khalidiyya tariqa to many followers. After the Ottoman Empire ceded Akhaltsikhe to the Russians following the Russo-Turkish War of 1828–29, he was forced to relocate again, migrating to Amasya alongside many of his disciples from Shirvan and Tiflis. In 1832, he moved to Sivas, where he lived for nine years. It was during his time in Sivas that figures like the poet Hamza Nigari joined him and entered the order.

He returned to Amasya in 1841, spending the remainder of his life there. Ismail Sirajuddin Shirvani died of the plague in 1848 and was buried in the Şamlar cemetery near Amasya. In 1869, his son, Şirvanizade Mehmed Rüşdi Pasha, built a mosque and a tomb over his grave. The hill where he is buried subsequently became known as "Şirvanlı Türbesi" (The Shirvani Shrine).

== Family ==
Ismail Shirvani had several children who went on to hold prominent positions in the Ottoman Empire:

- Abdulhamid Efendi—His firstborn son, born in Kurdamir. He died from drowning in Amasya in 1846.
- Şirvanizade Mehmed Rüşdi Pasha (1828–1874)—Born in Amasya, he rose to become the Grand Vizier of the Ottoman Empire under Sultan Abdulaziz. In 1869 he built the mosque and tomb over his father's grave.
- Ahmed Hulusi Efendi (1833–1888)—Born in Sivas, he served as a judge (qadi) in Istanbul and as the chief judge (kazasker) of Anatolia.
- Mustafa Nuri Bey (1844–1897)—Born in Amasya, he died in Istanbul and was buried in the Fatih cemetery.
- Haji Sherife Fatma Khanum—Married Hacı İsa Ruhi Efendi.

== Legacy ==
Ismail Shirvani's teachings and the deputies he appointed led to the formation of three major Naqshbandi-Khalidi branches in the Caucasus, in addition to several independent deputies who spread his teachings across the region. Several of Shirvani's deputies spread his teachings without establishing distinct branches. Muhammed Salih ash-Shirvani is described by later Khalidi sheikhs as among the greatest of Shirvani's deputies, though historical sources preserve little detail about him. Haji Ahmed Qiyasi (known in Shirvan as Molla Ahmed) was among Shirvani's earliest followers, originally from the Zardab. Exiled to Russia by General Yermolov in 1825, he later escaped to join his sheikh in Akhaltsikhe and accompanied him to Amasya, where he received his formal diploma of succession; his line continued in Denizli. Haji Ahmed Efendi Kululli, from the town of Külüllü (modern Ağsu), remained in Shirvan after Shirvani's emigration to gather and care for dispersed disciples; he was exiled by Russian authorities to Tambov in 1856, where he died the same year. Haji Mahmud Baba al-Kurdamiri was the youngest of the deputies, appointed to watch over Shirvani's family and disciples remaining in Shirvan; he had nearly five hundred disciples in the Shirvan and Shamakhi regions before his death in 1864.

=== The Dagestan Branch ===
The Dagestan branch was initiated by Khass Muhammed ash-Shirvani (d. 1857), a native of Shirvan who had studied in Dagestan before returning home and becoming Shirvani's disciple. At his sheikh's instruction, Khass Muhammed returned to Dagestan and facilitated the conversion of his own former teacher, Molla Muhammed Yaraghi (1777–1838), to the Khalidiyya order. Yaraghi subsequently received his own ijazah directly from Shirvani as well, and became the central figure through whom the order spread in Dagestan. From Yaraghi's circle emerged Jamaladdin Gazikumukhi (d. 1869), who in turn initiated the leaders of the Caucasian resistance—Ghazi Muhammad and Imam Shamil—into the order. This branch became the spiritual backbone of the resistance movement against the Russians, providing the mystical and organizational framework for the movement known as Muridism. Following Imam Shamil's surrender to the Russians in 1859, Jemaleddin Gazikumukhi emigrated to the Ottoman Empire, where he died in Üsküdar in 1869; Sultan Abdülmecid I had honored him with the title "Sheikh of the Caucasus."

=== The Karabakh Branch ===
The Karabakh branch was founded by Hamza Nigari (1805–1886), a poet and Sufi from the Cicimli settlement of the Karabakh Khanate. After an extensive search for a spiritual guide, Nigari came to Sivas and became Shirvani's disciple, entering the Naqshbandi order. Under Shirvani's guidance, Nigari spread the Khalidiyya among the Karapapak Turks of the Karabakh region. He later continued his activities from Amasya, where he attracted disciples from across the Caucasus and Anatolia, until he was exiled to Harput by Ottoman authorities in 1885, dying there in 1886. His line continued through deputies in both the Caucasus and Anatolia.

=== Jar Branch ===
The Jar-Balakan branch was founded by Haji Yahya Bey Qutqashini (d. 1869) from Qutqashen, who received his khalifate from Shirvani and spread the Khalidiyya throughout the northwestern Azerbaijan region of Jar-Balakan (modern Zakatala, Balaken, and Qakh). The branch was continued by Haji Yunus Efendi al-Lalali (1803–1860) of the Qakh district. Its most influential figure was Almalili Mahmud Efendi, who received his ijazah from Yunus Efendi and spread the order so widely—across Azerbaijan, Dagestan, Chechnya, Kazan, and Astrakhan—that the branch came to be known as the Mahmudiyya in his honour. During the Soviet period, it was through the Mahmudiyya's network of sheikhs and disciples that Islamic traditions and practices were preserved in Azerbaijan. The branch's subsequent representatives in Azerbaijan were Talalı Ahmad Efendi (d. 1904), Hacı Shuayb Efendi (d. 1912), Hacıyov Efendi (d. 1948), and Muhammed Nâsih Efendi (d. 1996).

== Sources ==
- Khalilli, Fariz; Mahammadjalil, Mahammad (2003). Mövlanə İsmayıl Siracəddin Şirvani: Həyatı, Fəaliyyəti və Ardıcılları [Maulana Ismail Sirajeddin Shirvani: His Life, Activities, and Followers] (in Azerbaijani). Baku: Adiloğlu.
