= Hamza Nigari =

Azerbaijani poet and muslim mystic

- Mir Həmzə Seyyid Nigari
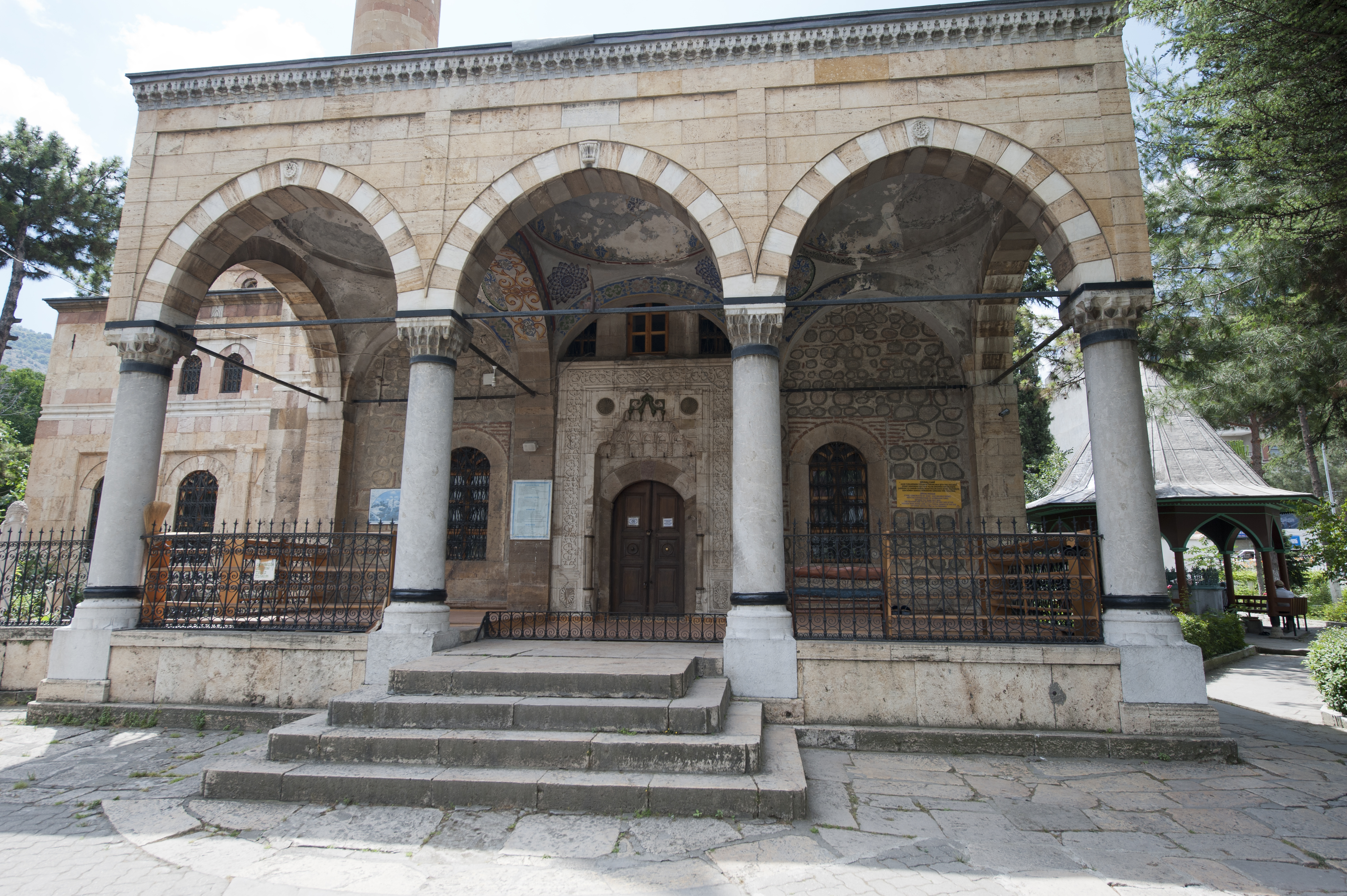
- Şirvanlı Mosque Complex, where Hamza is buried

Personal life
- Born: Hamza c. 1805 Cicimli, Karabakh Khanate
- Died: 1886 (aged 80–81) Harput, Ottoman Empire
- Buried: Şirvanlı Mosque complex, Amasya, Turkey
- Parent: Seyyid Rükneddin Efendi (father)
- Known for: Sufi poet; founder of the Karabakh branch of the Khalidiyya
- Other names: Hacı Hamza Nigârî; Seyyid Nigârî; Nigârî-i Karabâğî

Religious life
- Religion: Islam
- Order: Naqshbandi-Khalidi

Muslim leader
- Teacher: Ismail Sirajuddin Shirvani

Mir Hamza Seyyid Nigari (Mir Həmzə Seyyid Nigari; c. 1805 – September 1886), widely known by his pen name Nigari, was an Azerbaijani Naqshbandi Sufi sheikh, poet, and mystic of the nineteenth century. Born in the Karabakh region of the Caucasus, he became the most prominent disciple of Ismail Sirajuddin Shirvani in Anatolia and the founder of the Karabakh branch of the Khalidiyya order. He is regarded as one of the most significant mystical poets writing in the Azerbaijani and Persian traditions of his era, and remains venerated in both Azerbaijan and eastern Anatolia to this day.

== Name and lineage ==
His given name was Hamza. He adopted the pen name Nigari from an ideal beloved (negār) of whom he once dreamed; according to a variant tradition, the name also expressed gratitude to a woman named Nigar who assisted him financially during his studies. He is variously referred to as Mir Hamza, Haci Hamza Nigari, Seyyid Nigari, and Nigari-i Karabaghi in the sources. The honorific Seyyid reflects his claimed descent from the Ahl al-Bayt: his family traced their lineage through Seyyid Muhammed Shamseddin Akabali, who settled in Karabakh from Khorasan in the twelfth century and was held to be of the line of al-Hasan.

== Life ==
Nigari was born in the village of Cicimli in then Bargushad district of the Karabakh Khanate. His birth date is variously given in the sources as 1797, 1805, or 1815; the date 1805 (1220 AH) is the most widely cited. His father, Seyyid Rukneddin Efendi (also known as Mir Pasha), was killed when Nigari was only six months old, leaving him to be raised by his mother.

As a child Nigari showed little interest in formal study, preferring horsemanship and arms. It was only at his mother's insistence that, after the age of fifteen, he left his village to study under Mahmud Efendi, an Islamic scholar in Karakash, where he spent five years. He subsequently moved to Sheki to study under Shikest Abdullah Efendi, and also studied in Shamakhi.

Seeking initiation into the Khalidiyya branch of the Naqshbandi order, which was then spreading rapidly through the Caucasus, Nigari set out for Harput and then proceeded to Sivas, where he joined Ismail Sirajuddin Shirvani, a deputy (khalifa) of Khalid al-Baghdadi, the eponym of the Naqshbandiyya-Khalidiyya. According to a hagiographic tradition, while still a student of Shikest Abdullah Efendi, Nigari received a dream vision in which Ali directed him to seek out Shirvani; when he presented himself before the sheikh, Shirvani greeted him with the words: "Blessed is the one whose murshid is the Shah of Sainthood." The exact date of his initiation is uncertain; as Shirvani left the Caucasus in 1826, resided in Amasya until 1832, and then in Sivas until 1841, Nigari's initiation can be placed no earlier than the 1830s.

He returned to Karabakh with Shirvani, then accompanied him back to Sivas when the Russians invaded Dagestan, and subsequently to Amasya. In 1839, at his sheikh's direction, he entered an extended spiritual retreat (riyazet) at the Gümüşlü Sarachane Madrasa in Amasya. That same year he performed the Hajj pilgrimage, visiting Konya to pay his respects at the tomb of Rumi on the way, and stopping at Basra, Baghdad, Aleppo, and Damascus on his return before arriving in Istanbul and then back to Amasya.

=== Activity in the Caucasus ===
In 1841, at Shirvani's direction, Nigari returned to his homeland in Karabakh to propagate the Naqshbandiyya-Khalidiyya on his sheikh's behalf. He remained there until 1852, becoming particularly influential among the Karapapak Turks (also known as the Terekeme). He married during this period; his son Sirajuddin, a gifted poet who died young at the age of twenty, was born in Karabakh. At the outbreak of the Crimean War between the Ottomans and the Russians, Nigari led his followers to Kars to fight on the Ottoman side. Russian authorities had also briefly imprisoned him after it became known that he was spiritually associated with Sheikh Shamil's circle.

After his release, Nigari returned to Anatolia, spending three years in Erzurum before traveling to Istanbul in 1855.

=== Istanbul and later Anatolian years ===
During his Istanbul sojourn (1855–1858), Nigari met Mustafa Reshid Pasha, who is mentioned by name in one of his poems. He was reportedly offered the position of sheikh at the Emir Buhari Tekkein Fatih, which he declined, arranging instead for his disciple Mustafa Sabri Efendi to be appointed.

Returning from Istanbul to Erzurum, Nigari moved to Amasya in 1866 and shortly thereafter settled in Merzifon, where he taught Quranic exegesis (tafsir) and hadith and continued his spiritual guidance until 1883. His fame attracted large numbers of disciples, including significant communities of Karapapak and northern Caucasian refugees who had migrated to Anatolia in the aftermath of the Crimean War, settling across a broad area from Amasya to Muş and Kars.

== Exile and death ==
Nigari's frequent and passionate references in his poetry and teaching to the veneration of the Ahl al-Bayt and his open criticism of the Umayyad and Marwanid dynasties attracted hostile attention. Rumours circulated that he cursed the Companions of the Prophet and was engaged in seditious activity; local opponents alleged that his numerous devoted disciples made him capable of leading an insurrection. A petition demanding his removal from Amasya was submitted to the Sublime Porte. His departure for Harput has also been described as precipitated by a disagreement with the local mufti.

On 28 February 1885, Nigari departed Merzifon with his family. After a brief stay in Samsun and an unsuccessful intercession at Istanbul — where Koniçeli Kazim Pasha, author of Mekalid-i Ashk, petitioned the Porte on his behalf — he was officially exiled to Harput. He arrived there on 30 May 1885, having traveled via Tokat, Sivas, and Malatya, accompanied by his wife, brother-in-law, nephew, and the disciple Mahmud Efendi. After a year and a half in Harput, Nigari died there in September 1886. Before his death he requested that his body be returned to Amasya; with the permission of Harput Governor Hasan Pasha, his remains were transported and buried there.

=== Tomb ===
Nigari's tomb is located adjacent to the Şirvanlı Mosque in Amasya, a mosque built in 1894 by his followers and also known as the Azeris' Mosque. The tomb, constructed in the Ottoman Baroque style, is built of cut stone with a single large dome and four half-domes; its entrance is several steps above ground level. The tomb contains the coffins of Nigari himself, his son Ismail Efendi, and his nephew Mir Hasan Efendi. In the adjoining graveyard lie his two wives, Amine Harulnisa (d. 1910) and Latife Hanim (d. 1909). The original calligraphic panels inside the tomb were stolen in recent times.

== Legacy ==
Nigari was a Naqshbandi-Khalidi sheikh but occupied a strikingly unconventional position within that tradition; his followers regarded him not merely as a sheikh but as a pir — a founder of an independent line. He declared in his poetry that he had transcended the rulings of the four legal schools, and described himself as neither Sunni nor Shia but a sincere Muslim. The three pillars of his spiritual personality were divine love (ilahi ashk), veneration of the Ahl al-Bayt, and the Malamat ethos of self-concealment and indifference to social reputation.

His sheikh Ismail Sirajuddin Shirvani reportedly said of him that "Nigari has been annihilated in divine love, and his murshid is love itself." Nigari himself claimed to occupy the station of Kutbiyyet (the spiritual pole), and held that the purpose of creation was love of God and of the Ahl al-Bayt. He notably began writing poetry only after his initiation into Sufism.

=== Literary work ===
Nigari composed the majority of his poetry in aruz metre, with a smaller number of poems in syllabic verse. His Turkish poetry bears the linguistic features of Azerbaijani Turkish and is influenced by the poetry of Fuzuli. His Persian poetry is strongly influenced by the works of Rumi, Jami, and Hafez. His closest literary model among Ottoman-Azerbaijani poets was Fuzuli, several of whose ghazals he extended in the tahmis form. He also expressed admiration for Ruhi Baghdadi, Hafez, Khwaju Kermani, and Saadi Shirazi, as well as his Azerbaijani contemporary Nebati. Notably absent from his verse is the technical Sufi terminology typical of Naqshbandi poets.

His principal works are:

==== Turkish Divan ====
Nigari's principal collection was first published in Istanbul in 1886 (1301 AH) and reissued in Tiflis in 1326 AH. A critical edition prepared by Azmi Bilgin (Istanbul, 2003) contains 644 ghazals, 119 rubaʿi, 48 fragments, 14 tercibend, 2 terkibibend, 3 müstezad, a 28-stanza Sakiname, five tahmis on ghazals of Fuzuli, one letter in verse, and the 521-couplet Çaynamе. The Çayname ("Book of Tea") celebrates the qualities of tea in the manner modeled on Fuzuli's Bang-o bada ("Hashish and Wine"), interwoven with Sufi reflection and nostalgic descriptions of Karabakh and its poets.

==== Persian Divan ====
A complete organised divan in Persian, published in Istanbul in 1884 (1301 AH) and again in 1911 (1329 AH). A manuscript copy is held at the Süleymaniye Library (Ali Nihad Tarlan collection, no. 188). Portions were translated and annotated into Turkish by his grand-nephew Mustafa Fahreddin Akabali.

==== Nigarnama ====
A prose-and-verse mystical masnavi first published in Constantinople in 1887 (1305 AH). In it, Nigari causes his own heart to fall in love with a spiritual beloved encountered in a dream, and stages dialogues between mystics, lovers, and spiritual archetypes across an imagined celestial realm. The work has been compared in its mystical treatment to Fuzuli's Leyli and Majnun and in its visionary imagery to Sheikh Galib's Husn u Ashk. The author's name does not appear on the title page; instead the cover reads "this is the exalted work of a perfected elder." The Gerlach Books manuscript contains what appears to be an author's copy dated 1886, comprising 187 pages.

A rare composite manuscript volume containing Nigari's complete works — the preface, spiritual chain of succession (silsila), the 1886 Constantinople printed edition of the Turkish Divan and Çayname with handwritten additions of unpublished sections, the author's copy of the Nigarnama, and a hagiographic memoir (Menakib-i Seyyid Nigari, 10 pp.) — was offered at auction by Gerlach Books / Ex Oriente Lux Rare Books, Berlin, at €4,500.

=== Disciples ===
Among his principal deputies (khalifas) were Marashli Gazi Osman Efendi, Erzurumlu Hajji Mustafa Efendi (known as Shashi Hoca), Tokatli Hajji Zekeriyya Efendi, Hajji Mahmud Efendi (Postlu Hoca), Tashovalu Hajji Mustafa Efendi, Rizeli Hajji Tayyib Efendi, and the Istanbul-based Ahmed Hulusi Efendi of the Yesarizade family. In the Caucasus he gave khalifate to three individuals: Sheikh Hajji Chelebi Qaramani, Hajji Mahmud Efendi of the Kazakh district, and Muhammed Emin Efendi of Shaki.

The Karabakh branch he founded — the second of the three main Khalidiyya branches of the Caucasus — continued through Hajji Chelebi Qaramani's line in Azerbaijan. The line was carried by Mir Sadi Agha (d. 1961), a relative of Nigari, who was succeeded by his brother Sheikh Mir Pasha and then by Haci Mir Ikram Ziyadov.

== Sources ==
- Yazici, Tahsin (2003). "Hamza Nigari". Encyclopaedia Iranica. Vol. XI. pp. 648–649.
- Bilgin, A. Azmi (2007). "Nigârî". TDV İslâm Ansiklopedisi. Vol. 33. Istanbul: TDV İslâm Araştırmaları Merkezi. pp. 85–87.
- "Tomb of Mir Hamza Nigari". Kültür Envanteri. 2025.
- Gerlach Books / Ex Oriente Lux Rare Books (2024). The Complete Works of Seyyed Mir Hamza Nigârî (MSS_105). Berlin.
- Erginli, Zafer, and İbrahim Erol. "İSMAİL SİRÂCEDDÎN-İ ŞİRVÂNÎ-İ KÜRDEMİRÎ VE KAFKASLARDA NAKŞİBENDİYYE - HÂLİDİYYE KOLLARI." USUL İSLAM ARAŞTIRMALARI 33 (2020): 131–159.
