= Cicimli =

Cicimli or Cimcimli or Dzhidzhimli or Dzhimdzhimly may refer to:

- Cicimli, Barda, Azerbaijan
- Cicimli, Lachin, Azerbaijan
