= Melik Ajdar Mausoleum =

Ancient mausoleum in Lachin District, Azerbaijan

- Məlik Əjdər türbəsi
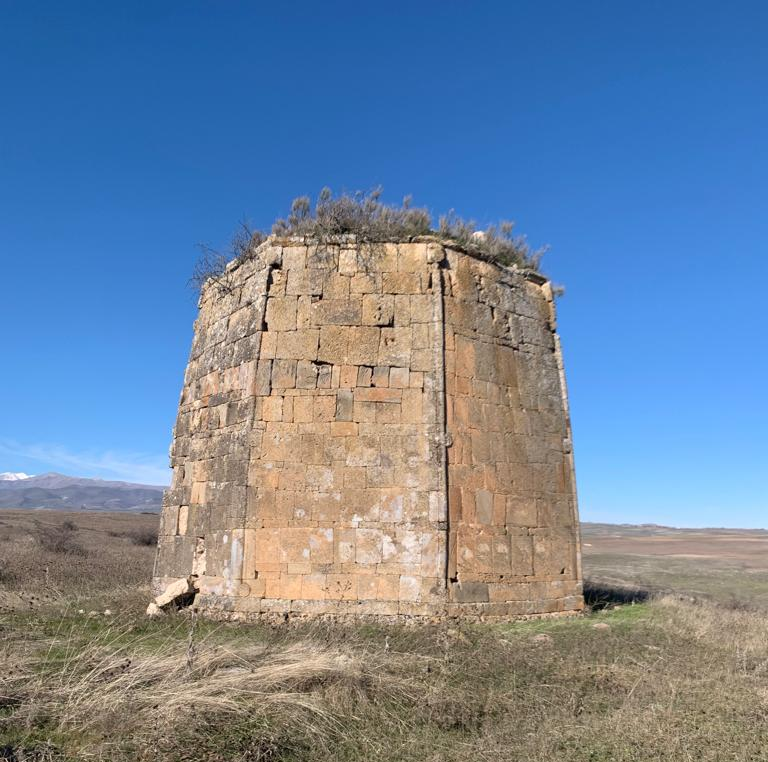
- Interactive map of Melik Ajdar Mausoleum
- Location: Jijimli, Lachin District, Azerbaijan
- Coordinates: 39°30′43″N 46°30′59″E
- Type: Mausoleum
- Completion date: 11th to 14th cc.
- Dedicated to: Melik Ajdar

Melik Ajdar Mausoleum or Jijimli Mausoleum is a mausoleum located in the high mountainous terrain of the Jijimli village of the Lachin District of Azerbaijan. Some sources date the construction of the mausoleum to the fourteenth century, whereas others suggest an earlier period, namely the eleventh to twelfth centuries.

== Plan and the architectural features of the mausoleum ==
In the plan of the octagonal mausoleums of Azerbaijan, the corpus is usually determined in the form of a vertical prismatic volume. In contrast to them, the octagonal body of the Melik Azhdar Mausoleum has the shape of a convex truncated pyramid. The building’s walls are not covered with vertical lines, the silhouette is framed by soft features. The general shape of the mausoleum resembles a parabola.

The tomb's body stands on a low, three-stage plinth-pedestal. Its base's area significantly exceeds the area of the upper octahedron, which, in turn, is the foundation for a small parabolic dome made of roughly processed stones. The transition from the base of the mausoleum to the base of the dome was made by tilting along a smooth curve of planes tapering upwards, the joints of which are underlined by thin, semicircular cross-section columns-plaits. The base of the dome, both on the facade and in the interior, is beaten off by a small cornice.

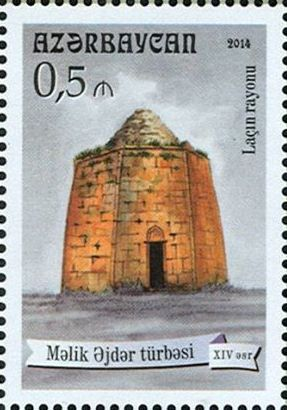
Stamp of Azerbaijan, 2014

According to the observations of various researchers, the mausoleum with its octahedral prismatic volume tapering to the top, and with the parabolic shape of the dome and the elegant chubuk-shaped corner columns was created as a result of the direct imitation of yurts, widespread among the Turks. Like the inner space, the outer volume of the mausoleum is one whole, the transitional strip between the body and the dome cover is practically absent. All sides of the body are lined with large, well-hewn stone slabs. The square capitals of the columns, covered with carved decorations, rest against the cornice. The front door is located on the north side of the building. The top of the doorway is covered with a solid architrave stone, which is shaped like a pointed arch. Traces of the hewn figure of a horseman are marked inside its border. A number of details of the monument are similar to the ones of the tombs in the village of Demirchilar, Gubadli district.

The corners of the octagonal body of the mausoleum are made in the form of thin stone columns, resembling rods, which form the basis of the yurt’s frame. According to the graphic description of M. S. Bulatov, “the architect who built the mausoleum used an ellipse to draw the silhouette of the structure.”

The wall’s inner surface rises vertically up to a height of 1.5 meters and then passes into a curved convex surface. The interior area, covered with gray plaster, repeats the outline of the outer part of the walls. In the southern part of the inner wall there is a small shallow niche of the mihrab facing the front door. The light enters the mausoleum through four small skylights at the base of the dome.

Another interesting feature of the mausoleum is that a rearing figure of a bull, made with a great expression, is inscribed in the tympanum of its decorative lancet arch. On the sides of the entrance, decorated on both sides with a ribbon ornament of rosettes, there are also images of bulls, which are somewhat worse preserved. These images further enrich the artistic properties of the monument, and also indicate that the images of animals in Azerbaijan were more widespread than expected.

== History ==
Due to the fact that the mausoleum has no building inscription nor any patterned surfaces, it is difficult to determine exactly when it was built. In the works of I. P. Shcheblykin, it is noted that the building belongs to the Seljuk period - approximately the 12th or the beginning of the 13th century. According to another version, the monument was built at the end of the 13th century under the Ilkhanids.

Both in terms of the space-planning solution and of the artistic design, the mausoleum of Malik Azhdar is a typical monument of Azerbaijani architecture. Such memorial monuments with octagonal structures without a strongly pronounced vertical orientation are the most widespread in the medieval architecture of Azerbaijan.

== Photo gallery ==
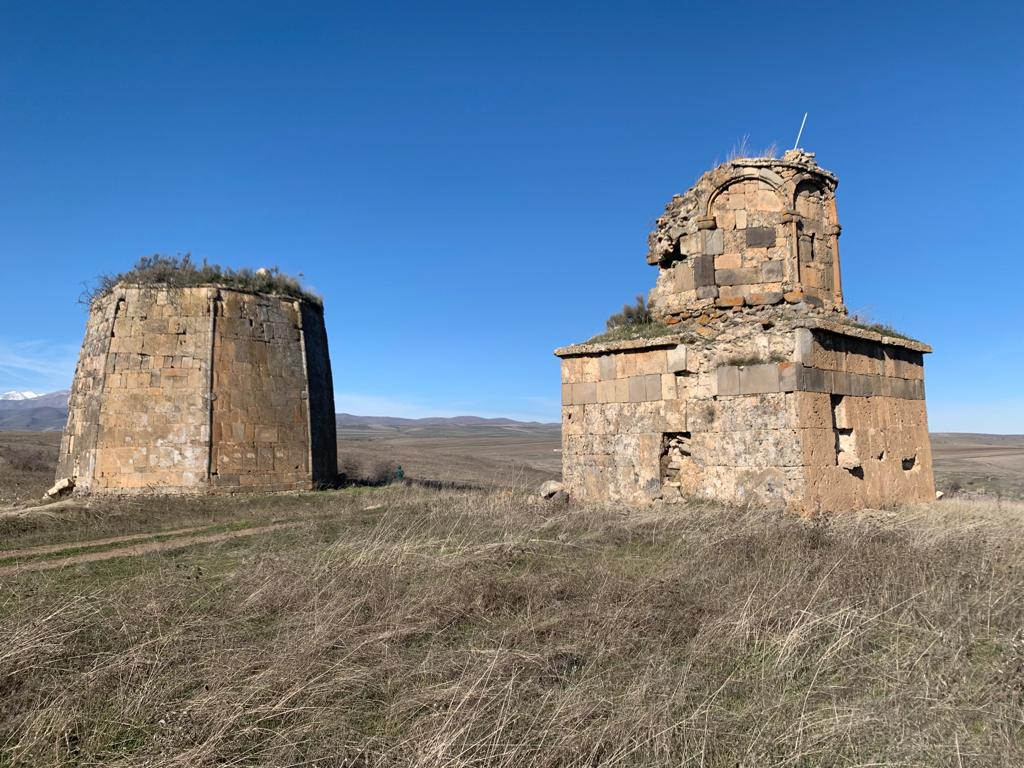

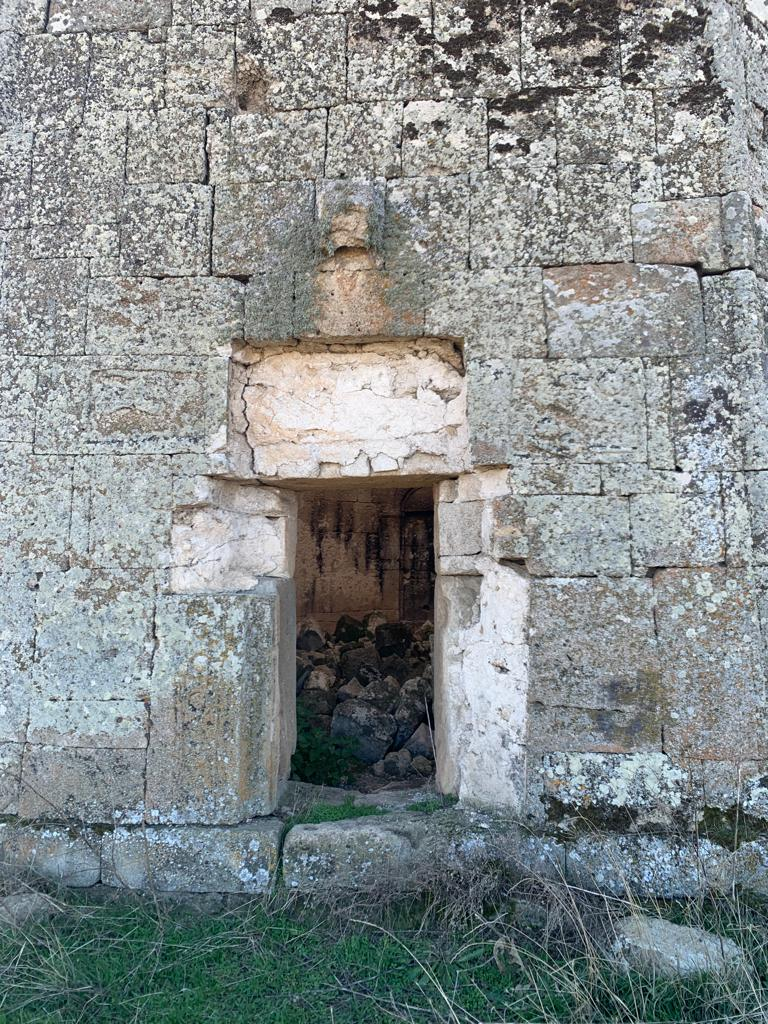

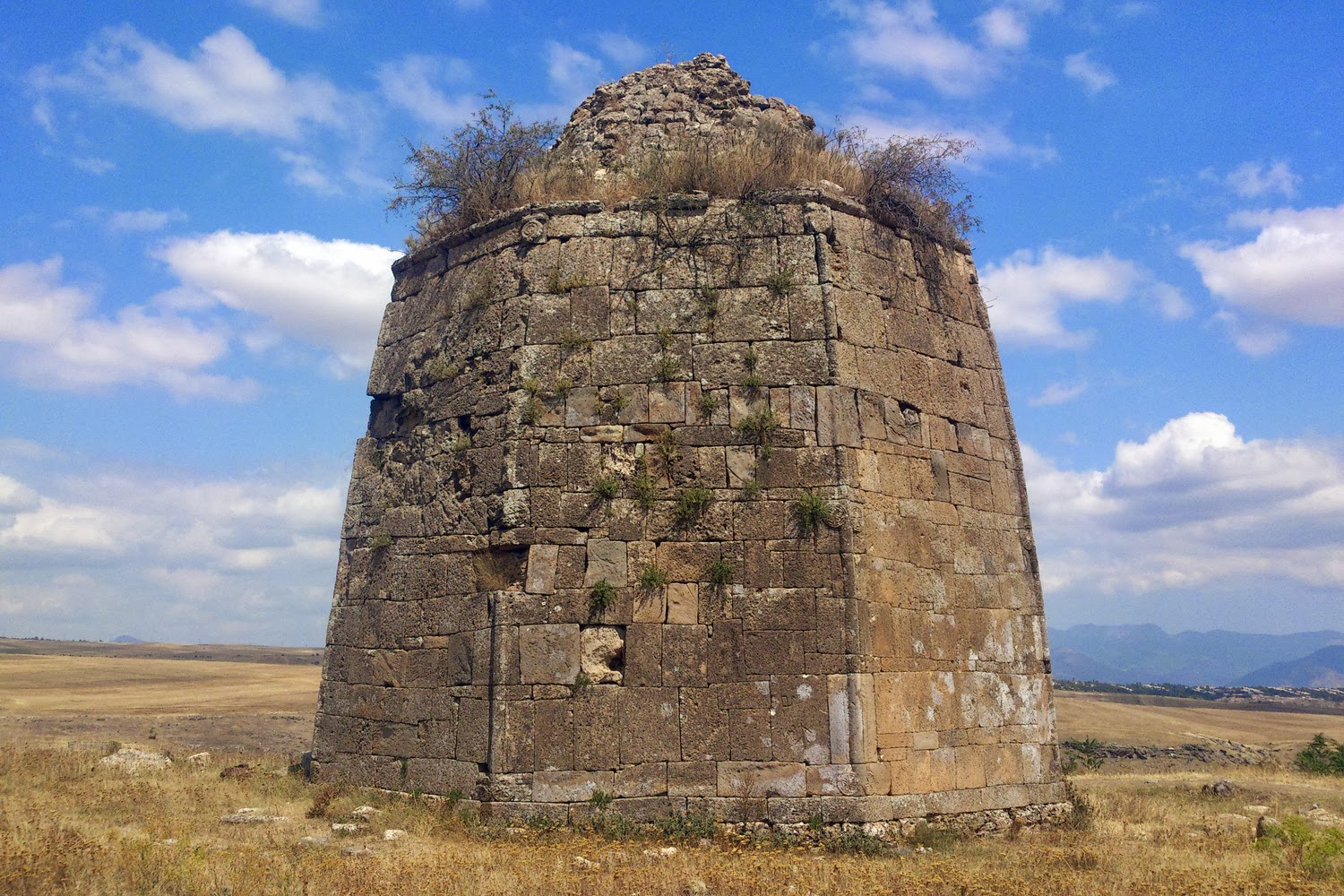

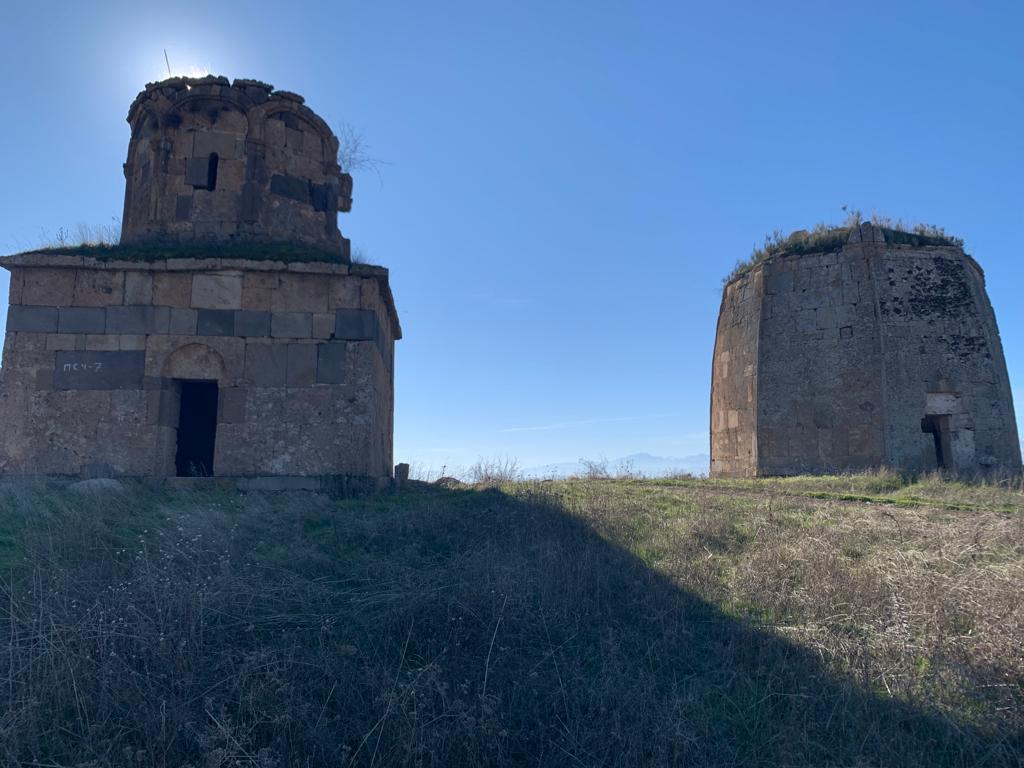

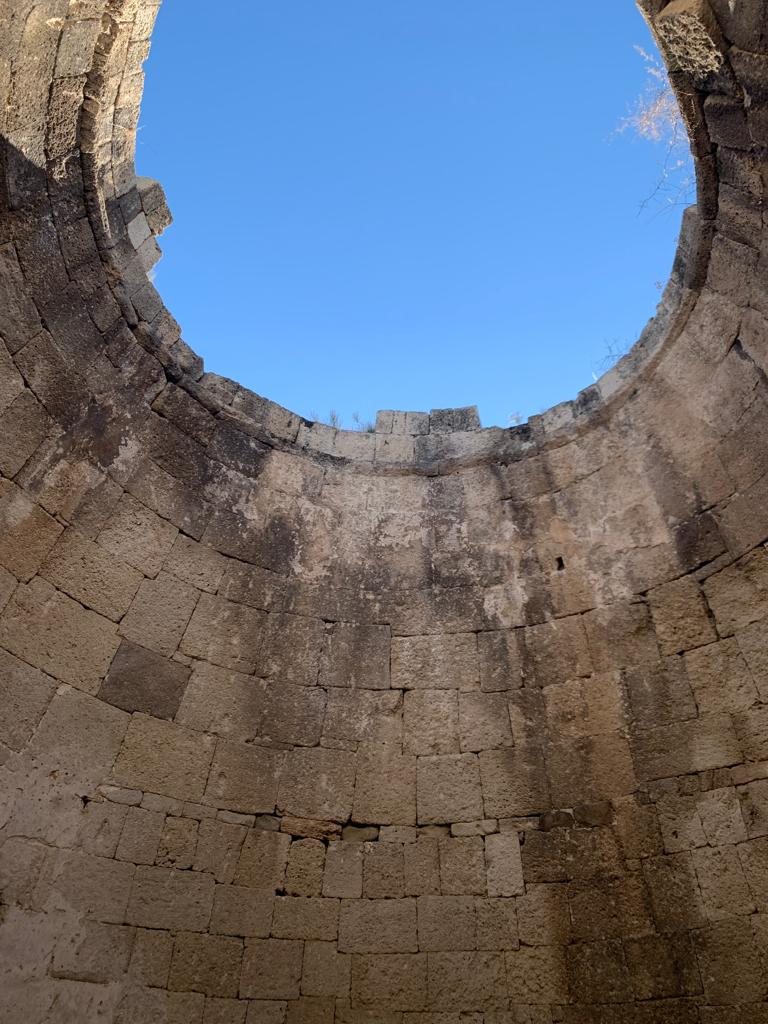

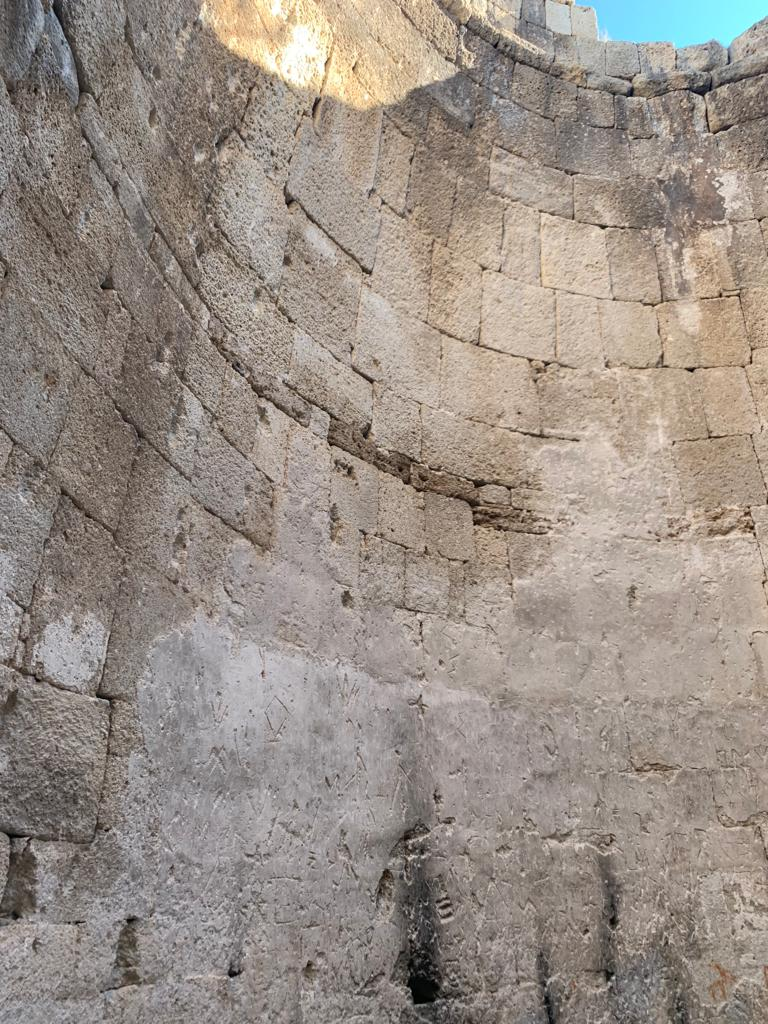

== See also ==
- Garabaghlar Mausoleum
- Mausoleum of Sheikh Juneyd
- Yusif ibn Kuseyir Mausoleum
- Mausoleum of Kara Koyunlu emirs
