= List of international presidential trips made by Mohamed bin Zayed Al Nahyan =

This is a list of international presidential trips made by Mohamed bin Zayed Al Nahyan (MBZ), the 3rd president of the United Arab Emirates. He assumed the position officially on 14 May 2022, the death of his brother Khalifa, but held the role de facto since 2014.

== List ==
=== 2022 ===
Country	Areas visited	Dates	Details
France	Paris	18-19 July	Met with President Emmanuel Macron, witnessed the signing of an energy deal to replace French energy imports from Russia.
Greece	Athens	25 August	Met with President Katerina Sakellaropoulou.
Oman	Muscat	27-28 September	Met with Sultan Haitham bin Tariq.
Russia	Moscow	11 October	Met with President Vladimir Putin, discussed the Ukraine war and OPEC+ supply cuts.
Egypt	Sharm El Sheikh	7 November	Attended the COP27.
Indonesia	Surakarta	14 November	Met president Jokowi and together inaugurated Sheikh Zayed Mosque
Indonesia	Bali	15-16 November	Attended the G20 Summit
Qatar	Doha	5 December	Met with Emir of Qatar, Tamim bin Hamad Al Thani. This is the first visit after the end of the Qatar diplomatic crisis.

=== 2023 ===
Country	Areas visited	Dates	Details
France	Paris	11 May	Met with President Emmanuel Macron.
Turkey	Istanbul	10 June	Met with President Recep Tayyip Erdogan.
Russia	St. Petersburg	16 June	Attended the St. Petersburg International Economic Forum. Met with President Vladimir Putin to discuss the Ukraine war.
Jordan	Amman	2 August	Met with Jordanian King Abdulla II.
Egypt	El Alamein	7 August	Met with President Abdel Fattah El-Sisi.
Ethiopia	Addis Ababa	18 August	Met with Prime Minister Abiy Ahmed.
India	New Delhi	9 September	Attended the G20 Summit, where the UAE participated as a guest to discuss sustainable economic growth and climate action.
Qatar	Doha	2 October	Met with Emir of Qatar, Tamim bin Hamad Al Thani and visited the 2023 International Horticultural Expo in Doha.
Saudi Arabia	Riyadh	20 October	Met Crown Prince Mohammed bin Salman and attended the GCC-ASEAN Summit.
Egypt	Cairo	21 October	Attended the Cairo Summit for Peace to de-escalate the Gaza war.

=== 2024 ===
Country	Areas visited	Dates	Details
Azerbaijan	Baku	8 January	Met with President Ilham Aliyev.
India	Gandhinagar	9 January	Attended the Vibrant Gujarat Global Summit. Met Prime Minister Narendra Modi.
Bahrain	Manama	16 February	Met with Bahraini King Hamad bim Isa Al Khalifa.
South Korea	Seoul	28-29 May	Met with President Yoon Suk Yeol. Attended the signing of a bilateral trade agreement.
China	Beijing	29-31 May	Met with President Xi Jinping. Attended the China-Arab States Cooperation Forum.
Italy	Borgo Egnazia	14 June	Attended the G7 session on artificial intelligence (AI) and energy. Met with Prime Minister Georgia Meloni, and British Prime Minister Rishi Sunak.
United States	Washington, D.C.	23 September	Met with President Joe Biden and Vice President and presidential candidate Kamala Harris, the visit was the first state visit of a sitting UAE president.
United States	Washington, D.C.	24 September	Met with Secretary of State Antony Blinken and National Security Adviser Jake Sullivan.
United States	Washington, D.C.	25 September	Met with Secretary of Commerce Gina Raimondo and members of the Senate Select Committee on Intelligence.
United States	Palm Beach, Florida	26 September	Met with former president Donald Trump, who was running for a second term in the 2024 United States presidential election.
Egypt	Cairo	3 October	Met with President Abdel Fattah El-Sisi.
Serbia	Belgrade	5 October	Met with President Aleksandar Vučić, attended the signing of a bilateral trade agreement
Jordan	Amman	6 October	Met with King Abdullah II.
Russia	Moscow	18 October	Attended the BRICS summit, the first since the UAE joined the organization in January 2024.
Kuwait	Kuwait City	10 November	Met with Emir Mishal Al-Ahmad Al-Jaber Al-Sabah.
Azerbaijan	Baku	11 November	Attended the COP 29 climate summit.

=== 2025 ===
Country	Areas visited	Dates	Details
France	Paris	5-6 February	Met with President Emmanuel Macron.
Albania	Tirana	25 February	Met with Prime Minister Edi Rama.
Qatar	Doha	25 June	Met with Emir Tamim bin Hamad Al Thani.
Turkey	Ankara	15-16 July	Met with President Recep Tayyip Erdogan.
Albania	Tirana	16 July	Met with Prime Minister Edi Rama.
Serbia	Belgrade	17 July	Met with President Aleksandar Vučić.
Hungary	Budapest	17-18 July	Met with Prime Minister Viktor Orban and President Tamás Sulyok.
Russia	Moscow	7 August	Met with President Vladimir Putin.
Angola	Luanda	24-25 August	State visit. Met with President João Lourenço.
Egypt	El Alamein	25 August	Met with President Abdel Fattah El-Sisi.
Saudi Arabia	Riyadh	3 September	Met with Crown Prince Mohammed bin Salman.
Qatar	Doha	10 September	Emergency visit. Met with Emir Tamim bin Hamad Al Thani.
Azerbaijan	Fuzuli, Shusha	16 September	Met with President Ilham Aliyev.
Egypt	Cairo	29 September	Met with President Abdel Fattah El-Sisi.
Pakistan	Rawalpindi	26 December	Official visit. Met with Prime Minister Shehbaz Sharif.

=== 2026 ===
Country	Areas visited	Dates	Details
India	New Delhi	19 January	3 hours visit. Met with PM Narendra Modi.
Russia	Moscow	29 January	Met with President Vladimir Putin.
Japan	Tokyo	8–10 February	State visit. He paid a courtesy visit to Emperor Naruhito, attended a royal banquet, and held a summit with Prime Minister Sanae Takaichi, declaring the strengthening of the energy alliance and the strengthening of cooperation in the fields of semiconductors and clean energy technology.
France	Évian-les-Bains	15–17 June	Attended the G7 session on artificial intelligence (AI) and energy as well as discussions on the Iran War. Met with President Donald Trump on the sidelines of the summit.
Egypt	El Alamein	12 July	Met with President Abdel Fattah El-Sisi.
Qatar	Doha	15 July	Gave condolences for the death of former Emir.
Germany	Berlin	9–11 September	State visit at the invitation of Federal President Frank-Walter Steinmeier. Met with Steinmeier and Federal Chancellor Friedrich Merz. The visit was the first state visit to Germany by a President of the United Arab Emirates.

== Future trips ==
Country	Location	Date	Details
United States	Miami	14–15 December	Mohammed bin Zayed Al Nahyan is with Emir of Qatar Tamim bin Hamad Al Thani and Crown Prince of Saudi Arabia Mohammed bin Salman scheduled to attend the 2026 G20 summit.
Saudi Arabia	Jeddah or Riyadh	To be announced	Mohammed bin Zayed Al Nahyan is scheduled to attend the 2026 AL summit.
Azerbaijan	Baku	23-24 June 2027	Mohammed bin Zayed Al Nahyan is scheduled to attend the 16th OIC summit.
