= Şirvanlı Mehmed Rüşdi Pasha =

Grand Vizier of the Ottoman Empire (1873-1874)

Şirvânîzâde Mehmed Rüşdi Pasha
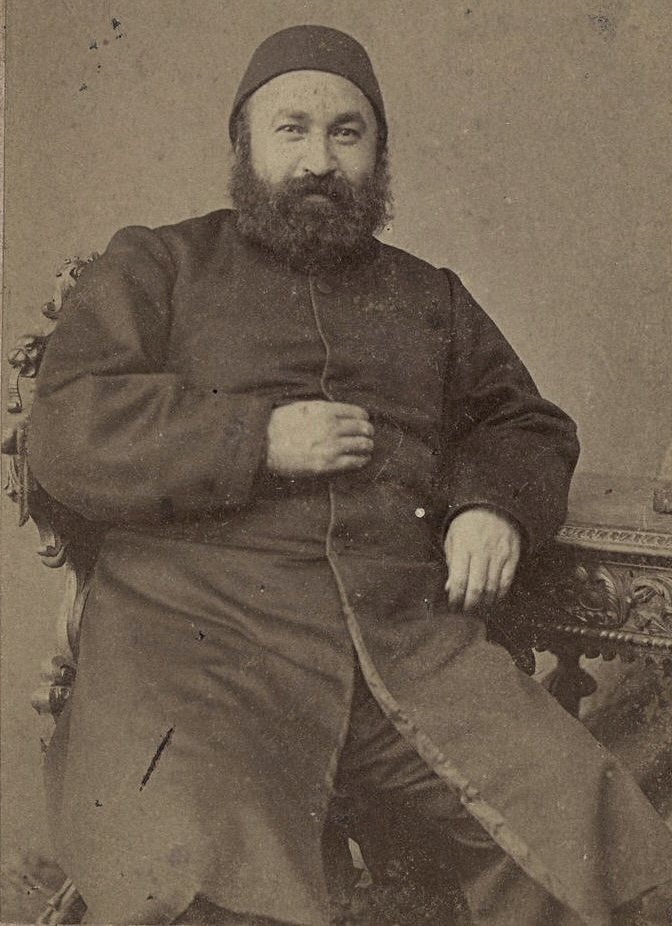

Grand Vizier of the Ottoman Empire
- In office 15 April 1873 – 15 February 1874
- Monarch: Abdülaziz
- Preceded by: Ahmed Esad Pasha
- Succeeded by: Hüseyin Avni Pasha

Personal details
- Born: 1828 Amasya, Ottoman Empire
- Died: 23 September 1874 (aged 45–46) Taif, Hejaz Vilayet, Ottoman Empire
- Cause of death: Typhoid fever
- Relations: Ismail Sirajuddin Shirvani (father)
- Occupation: Statesman

Shirvanizade Mehmed Rushdi Pasha (Şirvânîzâde Mehmed Rüşdi Paşa; 1828, Amasya – 23 September 1874, Taif) was an Ottoman statesman who served as Grand Vizier for ten months between 15 April 1873 and 15 February 1874 during the reign of Sultan Abdülaziz.

== Life ==
His father was Ismail Sirajuddin Shirvani, a prominent member of the Khalidiyya order and a member of the Ulama. His father was born in the village of Kurdamir in the Shirvan Khanate, which is why he is known by the epithet Şirvânîzâde (Son of Shirvani). His family migrated to Amasya, Anatolia, after the Russian invasion of Shirvan. He began his education in Amasya and moved to Constantinople in 1850, where he continued his studies at the Beyazıt Mosque madrasa and received his license (icazet) under Vidinli Mustafa Efendi.

In 1853, he was appointed as the Director of Pious Foundations (Evkaf) in Amasya, but resigned a year later to return to Istanbul. While tutoring the son of the Sheikh ul-Islam Arif Hikmet Bey, his intelligence caught the attention of the Sheikh, leading to his appointment as a teacher (müderris). He later served as a member of the land commission established under Ahmed Cevdet Pasha. Through his connection with Meşrepzâde Mehmed Ârif Efendi, he became close to high-ranking officials, particularly Keçecizâde Fuad Pasha, whom he accompanied to Syria.

In 1863, he was promoted to the rank of Vizier and appointed Governor of the Damascus Eyalet. Thus, he became the third person to rise from rank of müderris to vizier in Ottoman history after Köprülüzâde Fâzıl Ahmed and Yenişehirli Osman Pasha (1767‐1769). During his brief governorship, martial law, which had been in place since 1861, was abolished, and in 1864, municipal councils were established, giving way to local administrations. In 1864, when the provinces of Damascus, Sidon, and the Sanjak of Jerusalem were merged to form the Syria Vilayet, Şirvânîzâde became its first governor.

Upon returning to Constantinople in 1865, he served as Minister of Evkaf and later Minister of Finance. In 1869, he became the Minister of Interior. However, he fell into conflict with Grand Vizier Mehmed Emin Âli Pasha for bypassing the Grand Vizierate to contact the palace directly. He was subsequently shuffled through various ministerial positions, including the Ministry of Public Works and the Ministry of Justice. During the preparation of a legal code to be applied in the appellate, initial, and commercial courts planned to be established within the Council of Judicial Decrees (Dîvân-ı Ahkâm-ı Adliyye), Rüşdü Pasha, who was part of the opposing group led by Cevdet Pasha when it was argued that the French Code of Jurisprudence should be translated and applied in the regular courts, sided with Cevdet Pasha in undertaking the task of preparing a legal code called Mecelle-i Ahkam-i Adliyye (Code of Judicial Decrees) that would meet the needs of the time by utilizing the transactional sections of Islamic jurisprudence books to serve as the basis for the regular courts.

Following the death of Âli Pasha in 1871, the new Grand Vizier Mahmud Nedim Pasha exiled him to Amasya. He was later pardoned by Midhat Pasha in 1872 and returned to the cabinet, eventually serving his third term as Minister of Finance in 1873.

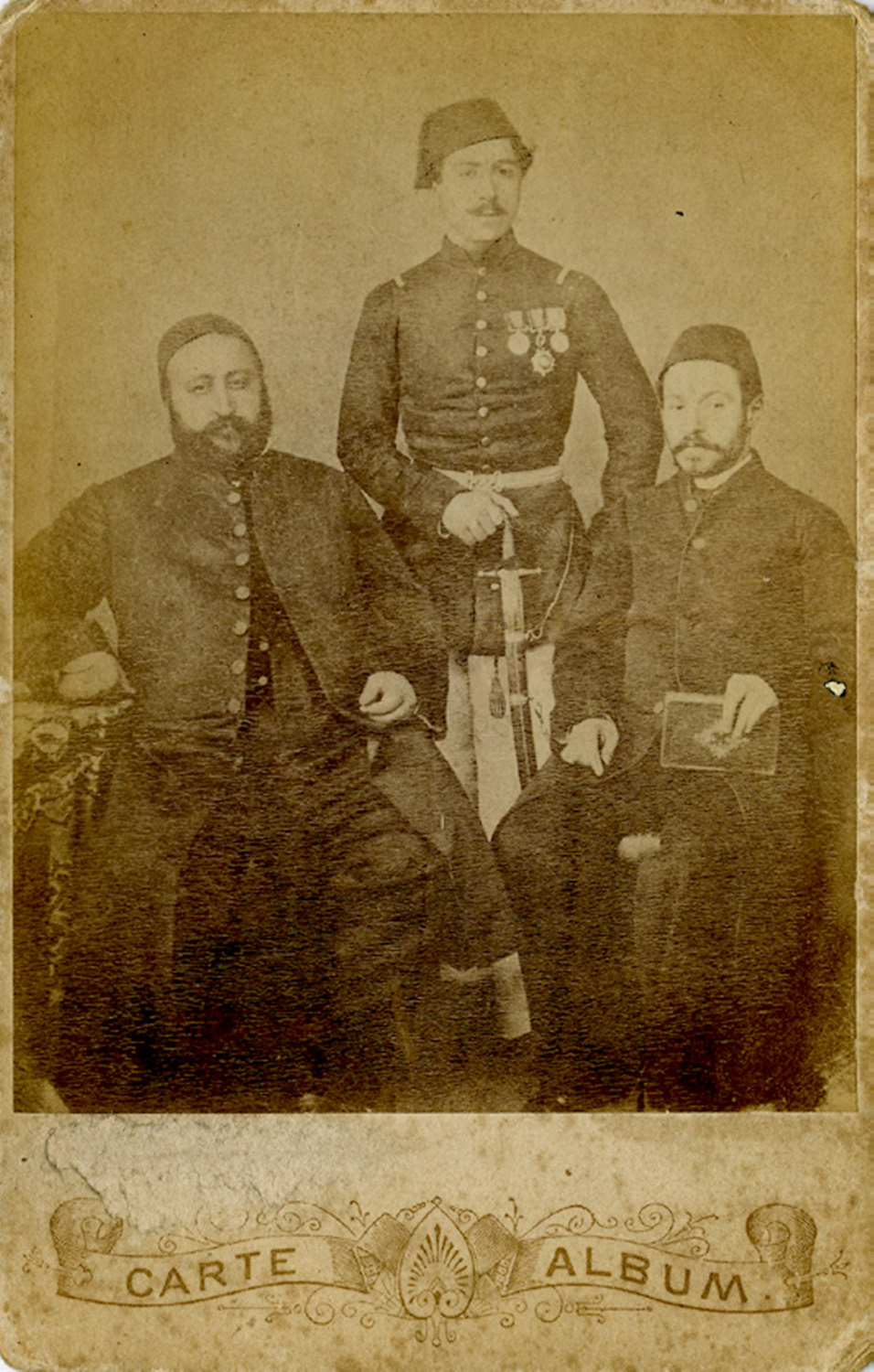
Şirvanizade Mehmed Rüşdi Pasha and his brother Ahmed Hulusi Efendi, the Qadi of Istanbul.

He was appointed Grand Vizier on 15 April 1873. The most significant issue during his tenure was the administration of Egypt. In 1873, the Khedive of Egypt, Isma'il Pasha, visited Istanbul seeking greater autonomy. Historical accounts suggest that the Khedive distributed significant bribes to Ottoman officials to secure the 1873 firman, which consolidated Egypt's privileges into a single document, granting it nearly complete internal autonomy.

Şirvânîzâde was dismissed on 15 February 1874, allegedly due to palace intrigues involving his successor, Hüseyin Avni Pasha. He was then appointed Governor of Aleppo, and later Governor of the Hejaz Vilayet. Shortly after arriving in Taif to take up his post, he died of typhoid fever. He is buried there.

He commissioned the Shrine of Ismail Shirvani in Amasya in 1870 in honor of his father.

== Evaluation ==
While some historians mention his involvement in receiving gifts and bribes, the Sicill-i Osmani provides the following description:

He was of medium height, stocky, and had a smiling face. ... He was learned, virtuous, an accomplished writer, intelligent, generous, harmonious, and moderate.

== Works ==
- He translated al-Mawardi's work Qanun al-Wazarah (Laws regarding the Ministers) from Arabic into Turkish.

Preceded by Ahmed Esad Pasha	Grand Vizier of the Ottoman Empire; 15 April 1873 – 15 February 1874	Succeeded by Hüseyin Avni Pasha
