= Yeni yol, Shamkir =

Yeni yol
- Location within Azerbaijan
- Coordinates: 40°49′N 46°09′E
- Country: Azerbaijan
- Rayon: Shamkir

Population
  - Total: 2,012
- Time zone: UTC+4 (AZT)
  - Summer (DST): UTC+5 (AZT)

Yeni yol (known as Leninabad until 1999) is a village and municipality in the Shamkir Rayon of Azerbaijan. It has a population of 2,012. The municipality consists of the villages of Yeni yol and Füzuli.
