= Fuzuli =

Fuzuli or Fizuli may refer to:

== People ==
- Fuzuli (poet) (Mahammad bin Suleyman, 1483–1556), Azerbaijani poet
- Fizuli Mammedov (born 1977), Azerbaijani footballer
- Fizuli Alakbarov (born 1958), Azerbaijani politician

== Places ==
- Fuzuli (city), a city in Azerbaijan named for the Azerbaijani writer
  - Fuzuli District, Azerbaijan
- Füzuli, Samukh, a village and municipality in the Samukh Rayon of Azerbaijan
- Füzuli, Shamkir, a village in the municipality of Yeni yol in the Shamkir Rayon of Azerbaijan
