= Ahmed Hulusi Efendi =

Ottoman ambassador to Afghanistan (1877–1878)

- Şirvânîzâde Ahmed Hulûsî Efendi
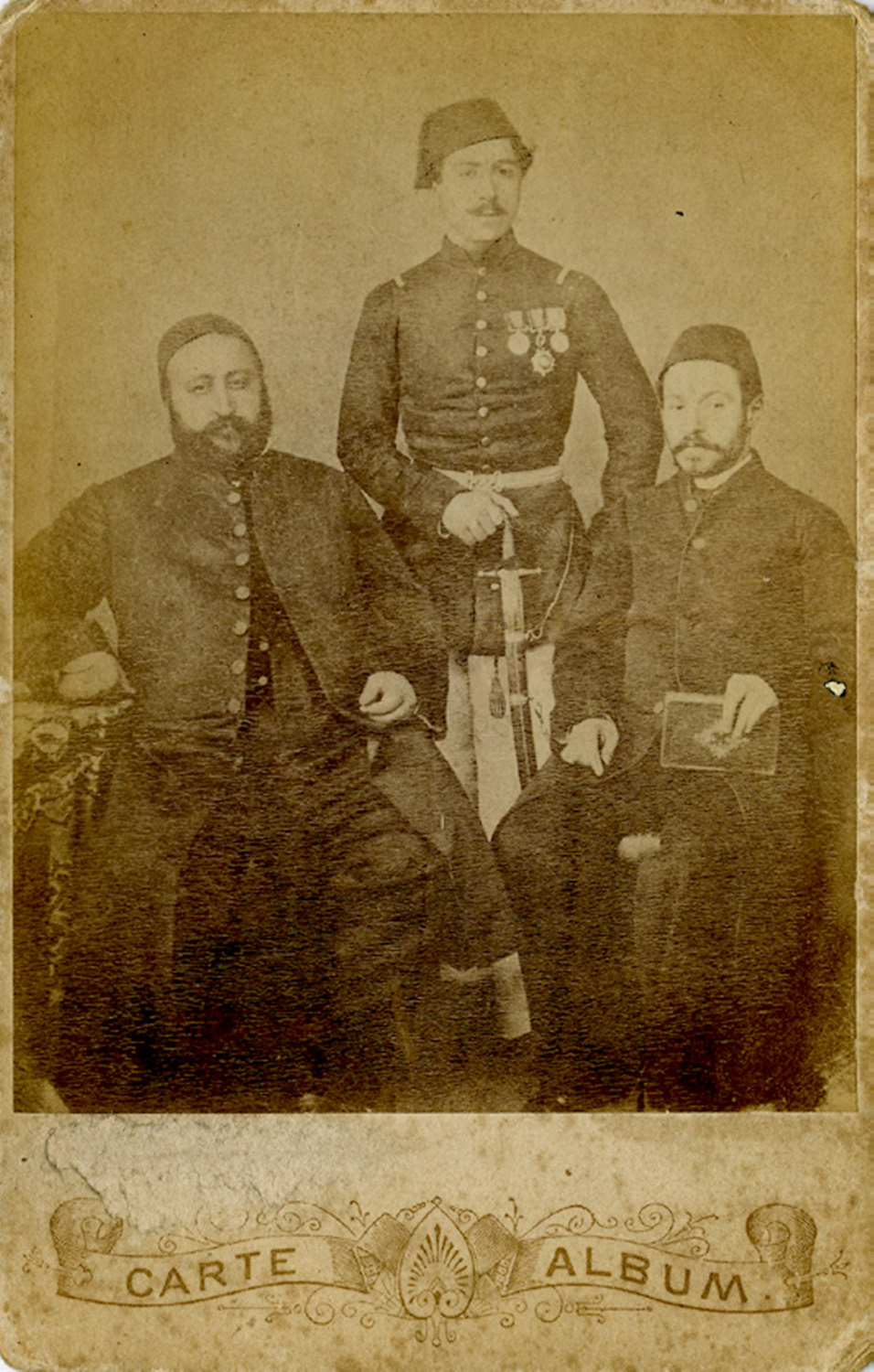
- Ahmet Hulusi Efendi (right) with his elder brother Şirvanlı Mehmed Rüşdi Pasha (left). Photo by Abdullah Freres

Ambassador of Ottoman Empire to Emirate of Afghanistan
- In office 1877–1878

Personal details
- Born: c. 1833 Sivas or Amasya, Ottoman Empire
- Died: January 17, 1889 (aged 55–56) Amasya, Ottoman Empire
- Relatives: Ismail Sirajuddin Shirvani (father); Şirvanlı Mehmed Rüşdi Pasha (brother)
- Occupation: Islamic jurist, judge, diplomat
- Known for: Member of the Mecelle drafting commission; first official Ottoman envoy to Afghanistan

Şirvânîzâde Ahmed Hulûsî Efendi (c. 1833 – 17 January 1889) was an Ottoman Islamic scholar (ʿālim), jurist, judge, and diplomat. He is notable for two landmark achievements: his membership on the elite commission that drafted the Mecelle (Mecelle-i Ahkâm-ı Adliyye), the most renowned codification of Islamic law in modern history, and his appointment as the first official Ottoman envoy to Afghanistan in 1877–1878.

== Family and early life ==
Ahmed Hulusi Efendi was born in Amasya, though he may have been born in Sivas during his father's residence there between 1832 and 1841. He was the son of the Naqshbandi sheikh and Islamic scholar Ismail Sirajuddin Shirvani and the younger brother of Şirvanlı Mehmed Rüşdi Pasha, who served as Grand Vizier of the Ottoman Empire under Sultan Abdulaziz. His father described his own standing to a British officer as "a Cazi [kadı] and a Syud [sayyid]," a lineage that, in Hulusi Efendi's own words, "entitled me to respect and added to my influence." He completed his formal education in Amasya and Constantinople.

== Career ==
Hulusi Efendi rose through the ranks of the Ottoman ilmiye — the Islamic scholarly and judicial class — with considerable distinction. He received an early appointment as a müderris (madrasa teacher) before being appointed in 1849 as a kadı (judge) to the Aydos district of Istanbul (modern Kartal). In May 1867, he was promoted to the prestigious kadılık of the Galata district. Later that same year, in December, he received the paye (license) of Mecca which allowed him to be a kazasker (chief judge). In 1874, he was actually appointed as judge of Constantinople, and was subsequently awarded the chief judgeship of Anatolia — one of the most powerful juridical positions in the Ottoman Empire, subordinate in principle only to the kazasker of Rumelia and the Şeyhülislam.

In 1869, an ally of his elder brother Mehmed Rushdi — the powerful administrator-jurist Ahmed Cevdet Pasha, personally selected Hulusi Efendi as one of fifteen jurists to participate in the historic compilation of the Ottoman Civil Code, the Mecelle-i Ahkâm-ı Adliyye. Hulusi Efendi served on the drafting committee from the project's launch in 1869 until its completion in 1876, participating in the preparation of fourteen of the sixteen volumes of the code (comprising 1851 articles); he did not participate in the sixth, seventh, or eighth books. His role in the thirteenth book, Kitabü'l-İkrâr ("Admissions"), was described by later scholars as preponderant. In the successive volumes, his seal appears under varying official titles reflecting his changing posts: Dîvân-ı Ahkâm-ı Adliyye âzası (member of the Council of Judicial Ordinances), Şûrâ-yı Askerî müftüsü (mufti of the Military Council), Dârülhilâfe kadısı (judge of the Seat of the Caliphate), and finally Meclis-i Tedkīkāt-ı Şer'iyye ve Meclis-i İntihâb-ı Hükkâm reisi (president of the Council for Examination of Sharia Matters and Selection of Judges).

== Mission to Afghanistan ==
In the spring of 1877, following the outbreak of the Russo-Ottoman War, Sultan Abdulhamid II appointed Hulusi Efendi to lead the Porte's first official diplomatic mission to Emirate of Afghanistan. The strategic objective was to convince the Afghan Amir Sher Ali Khan to open a third front against the Russian Empire in Central Asia by joining forces with the Ottomans. Positive assurance of such a voyage came from British ambassador Austen Henry Layard. He wrote that Hulusi Efendi was "a Roziaskeir [kazasker], a high dignity amongst the Ulemah, and one commanding influence with Mahometans," and that he was "very favourably spoken of."

Hulusi Efendi departed Istanbul in early summer 1877 with an entourage that included the secretary Mektûbîzâde Ahmed Bahâî Efendi and other officials. The delegation traveled by sea to Alexandria, where they were received by Khedive Ismail, before passing through Port Said and Aden to reach Bombay in early August 1877. The Ottoman envoy's arrival provoked an enthusiastic reception from Bombay's Muslim population, causing considerable concern among British Raj officials, who had issued strict orders to keep the delegation away from Muslim population centres. After passing through Sind and Punjab, the delegation crossed the Khyber Pass from Peshawar to Jalalabad, reaching Kabul on September 8, 1877.

Both Ottoman and British sources describe the reception in Kabul as cordial. Hulusi Efendi later reported: "I was treated in Cabul with great respect. The Ameer commanded that due honor and courtesy should be extended to me." He met with Amir Sher Ali Khan and, unusually for foreign visitors to 19th-century Afghanistan, was granted considerable freedom of movement in the capital, including access to Afghan scholars, courtiers, and ulema. The Sultan's gifts to the Amir included a sacred hair from the Prophet's beard.

The mission ultimately failed in its primary diplomatic objective: Sher Ali Khan did not join the Ottoman war effort against Russia. The delegation returned after delivering Sultan Abdülhamid's letters and gifts. Scholars have noted, however, that Hulusi Efendi's extensive background in Islamic legal codification makes it plausible that his meetings with Afghan scholars contributed to emerging conversations about the codification of Hanafi jurisprudence in Afghanistan, a process that accelerated in that country within years of his visit.

== Later life and death ==
Upon his return, Hulusi Efendi was appointed as naib (deputy judge) of Diyarbakır in 1878. Two years later, he was required to reside in Amasya. He died there on 17 January 1889. Unlike many of his colleagues on the Mecelle commission, he left no independent written works.

== Sources ==
- Ahmed, Faiz (2015). "Istanbul and Kabul in Courtly Contact: The Question of Exchange between the Ottoman Empire and Afghanistan in the Late Nineteenth Century". Osmanlı Araştırmaları / The Journal of Ottoman Studies. XLV: 265–296.
- Yavuz, Hulusi (1989). "Ahmed Hulûsî Efendi". TDV İslâm Ansiklopedisi. Vol. 2. Istanbul: TDV İslâm Araştırmaları Merkezi. p. 90.
- Süreyya, Mehmet (1890). Sicill-i Osmânî. Vol. I. Istanbul: Matba'-i 'âmire. p. 307.
- Baysun, M. Cavid (1952). "Şirvânî-zâde Ahmed Hulûsî Efendi'nin Efganistan Elçiliğine Âid Vesikalar". Tarih Dergisi. IV: 147–158.
