= Mausoleum of Kara Koyunlu emirs =

Cultural heritage of Turkmens in Armenia

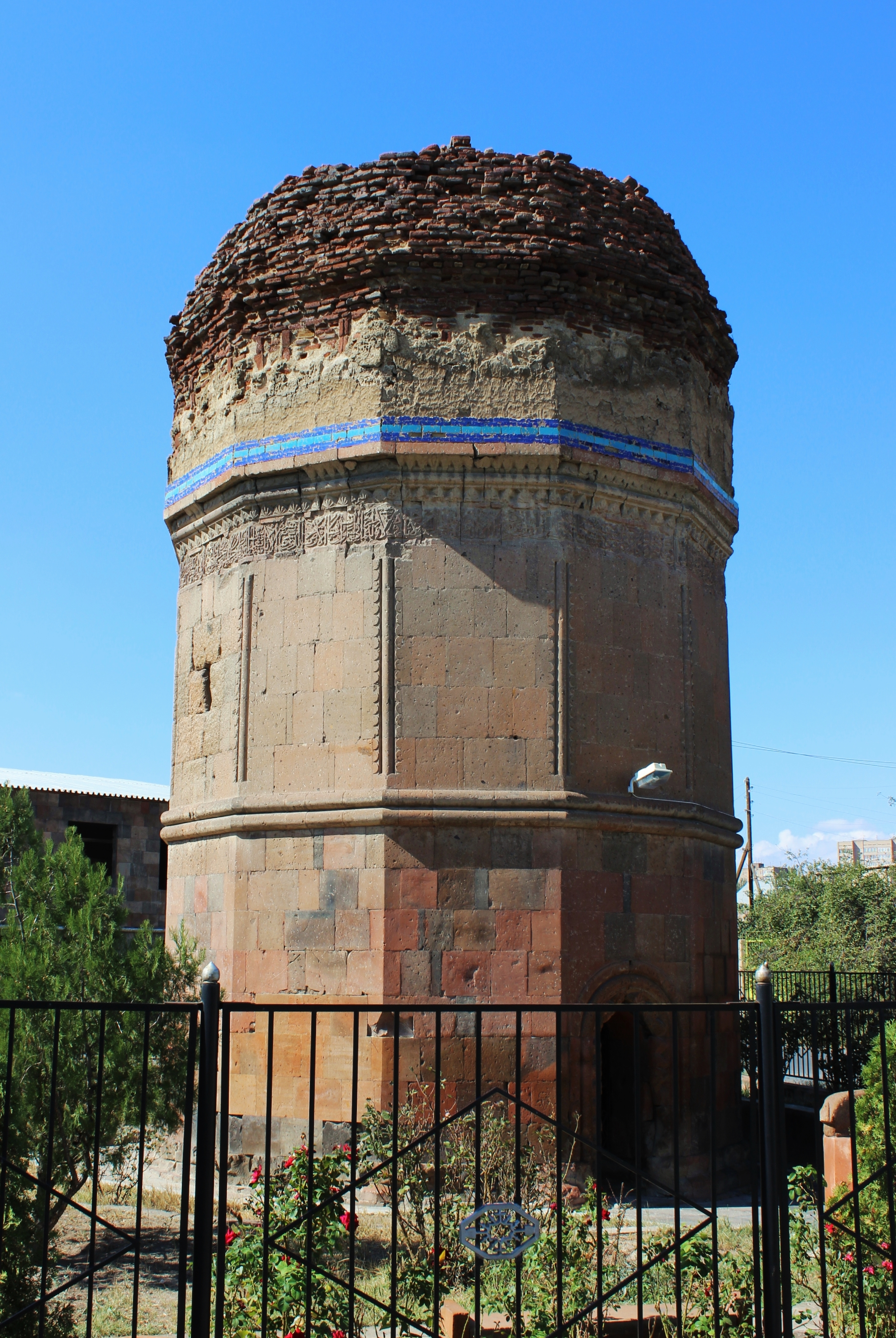
- Southeast façade of the Emir Pir-Hussein Mausoleum in Argavand

- Location within Armenia

Religion
- Affiliation: Islam

Location
- Location: Argavand, Ararat Province, Armenia
- Coordinates: 40.156328°N 44.439759°E

Architecture
- Type: Mausoleum/funerary tower
- Style: Islamic
- Completed: 1413

Specifications
- Direction of façade: east
- Dome: 1
- Materials: Tuff (tower), brick (dome), blue glazed ceramic tile (decorative trim)

The Mausoleum of Kara Koyunlu emirs (Armenian: Կարա-Կոյունլուների դամբարան) is a 15th-century mausoleum located in the village of Argavand, Ararat Province, on the outskirts of the Armenian capital Yerevan. It was erected in 1413 by a local ruler, Pir Husayn, most likely over the grave of his father Saad, during the rule of the Qara Qoyunlu, a Turkoman dynasty which ruled over Armenia, most of Iran, and other lands in the 15th century. The site is thought to have served as the dynastic cemetery of Emir Saad or his successors.

== History ==
The mausoleum bears an Arabic inscription, which states that it was built by Emir Pir Husayn, son of the late emir Saad, in 1413 (816 AH), during the reign of the Kara Koyunlu co-rulers Pir Budaq and Kara Yusuf. Most likely, Pir Husayn built the mausoleum over the grave of his father, although it is also possible that he built it for himself. Pir Husayn is mentioned as the chief of the Ararat region in an Armenian colophon from 1411, which suggests his father was already dead for 2–3 years by the time he built the mausoleum. Saad was a Turkic tribal leader. His followers, who came to be known as the Saadlu, were among those Turkic tribes that accompanied Timur from Central Asia. After Timur's 1387 campaign in Armenia, Saad established his rule in the vicinity of Yerevan. The area where the Saadlu settled became known as Chukhur-Saad (or Chokhur-e Saad, 'Vale of Saad'), a name which was later applied to the larger surrounding region.

According to the inhabitants of Argavand, there used to be other (sometime prior to 1960), much smaller mausoleums nearby which were ruined and whose stones were subsequently used for other structures in the area. It is thus likely that the area served as the dynastic cemetery of Emir Saad or his successors. According to Hakob Papazian, the presence of such a dynastic cemetery suggests that Emir Saad had succeeded in establishing his rule over the lands on the left bank of the Aras River in the early 15th century; additionally, its proximity to Yerevan suggests that the city served as the seat of those rulers.

The tomb was restored and ceremonially reopened to the public in 2002. In December 2012, during the high-level meeting between Armenia and Turkmenistan, it was proposed to jointly restore the monument and its dome. In June 2013, a project of restoration of the mausoleum was presented, and in February, 2015, the reconstruction and repair of the mausoleum by an Armenian construction company began on the order of the Ministry of Culture of Armenia. There is an agreement between the Ministry of Education, Science, Culture and Sports of Armenia and the Ministry of Culture of Turkmenistan.

== Architecture ==
The Kara Koyunlu mausoleum has a decagonal plan. Each of the monument's façades extend from the base of the tower until midway up the dome. Architecturally, it is divided into three sections; a lower section with an entrance, a middle section with two windows and decorative elements, and an upper section consisting a dome. The main body of the tower is constructed of tuff stone, while brick was used as the underlying material for the construction of the dome.

Decorative elements include a blue and turquoise glazed ceramic tile trim that is still visible along the upper portion of the tower, just below the base of the dome and above an inscription. Below the tile trim is some decorative molding, while a frieze in bas-relief encircles the top portion of the funerary tower is inscribed in Arabic and begins with a famous sura from the Quran. It then goes on to commemorate Emir Pir Husayn, the son of Saad. The inscription says:

In the name of Allah gracious and merciful! Allah... there is no god besides Him, alive (or) real. Neither drowsiness nor sleep can seize Him. He owns everything in the heavens and on the earth. Who will plead, except with His permission? He knows what was before them and what will be after them, while they perceive nothing from His knowledge other than He wishes. His throne embraces the heavens and the earth, and He is not burdened by guarding them. Indeed great and high is He. Ordered to build this blessed tomb (kubba) the greatest, the noblest, abundant in generosity and magnanimity, the support of kings and sultans, refuge for the weak and the poor, guardian of scientists and those who seek knowledge, aid to the poor and wayfarers, the glory of the state and the faith, Emir Pir-Hussein, son of the late absolved Emir elevated to His patronage, the most merciful Emir Sa’ad… may the earth lie light upon him… in the days of the reign of the Great Sultan, the most generous Khaqan, the Sultan of Sultans in the East and the West, the aid of the state and the faith, Pir Budaq Khan and Yusef Noyän… may Allah perpetuate their power, on the fifteenth of Rajab of the year 816 (11 October 1413).

There is a single entrance into the mausoleum's interior. Two small rectangular windows are located in the north and south façades, centered between the upper and lower portions of the tower.

== Gallery ==
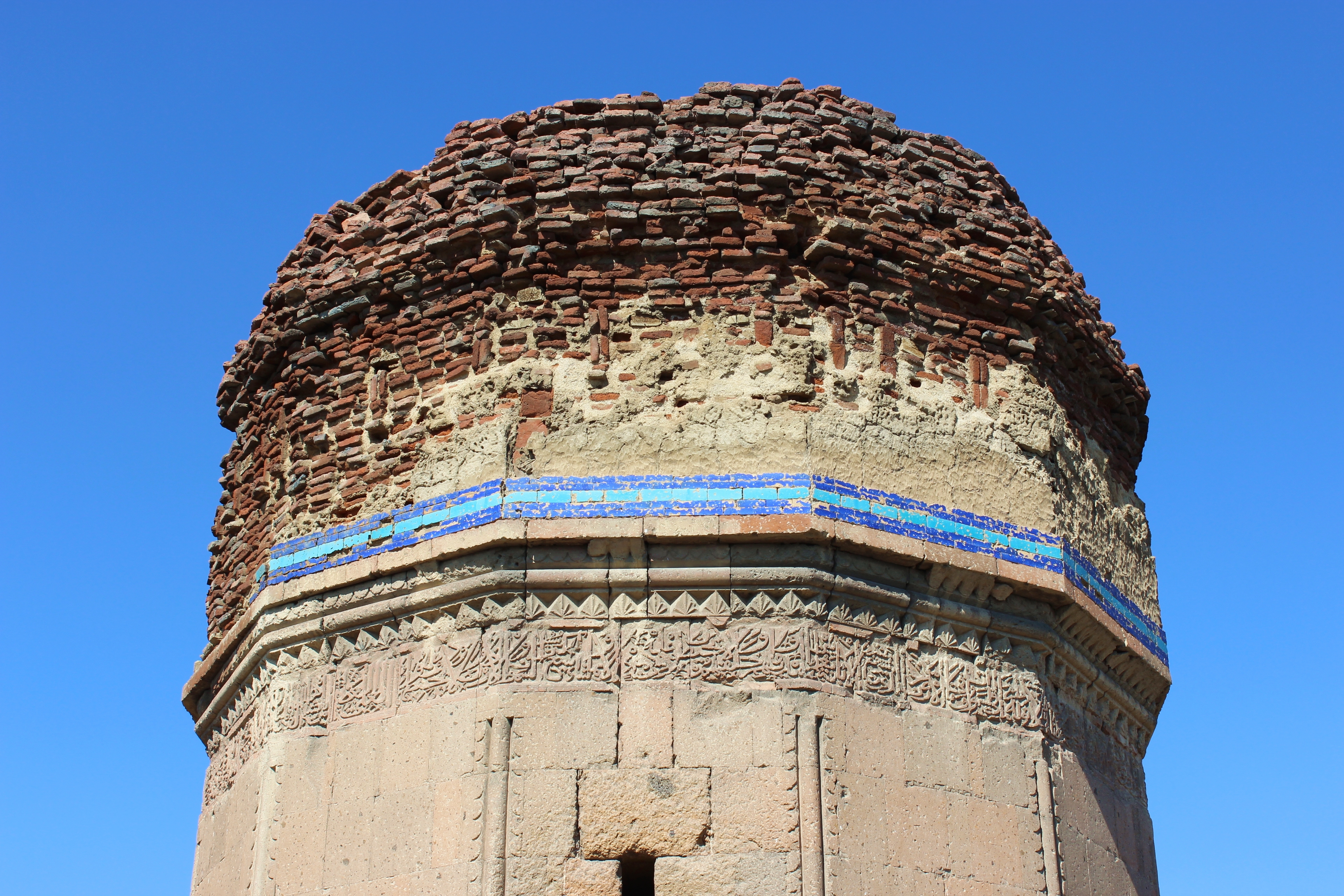
Dome of the mausoleum with the Arabic inscription

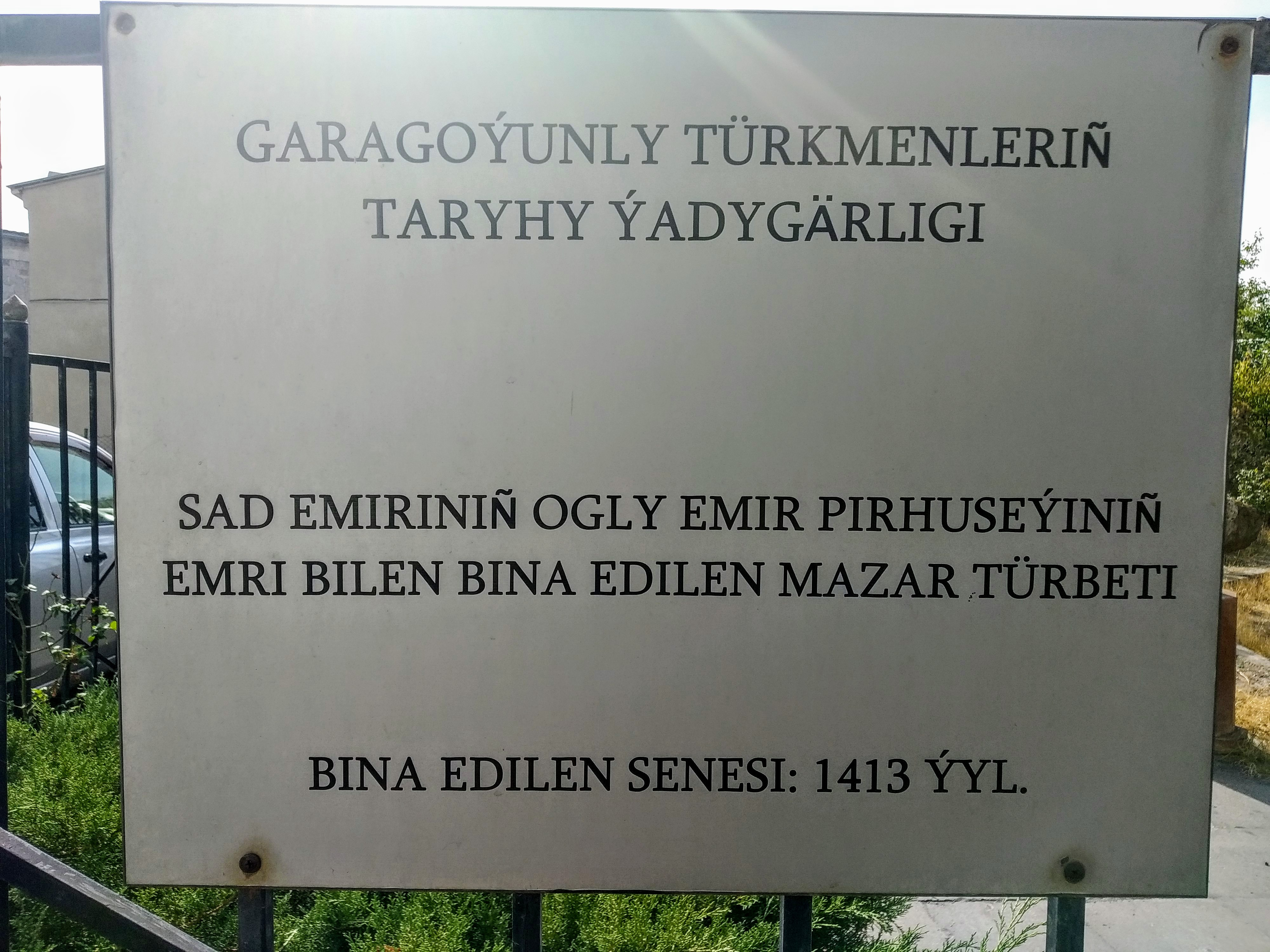
Signboard by the entrance in the Turkmen language

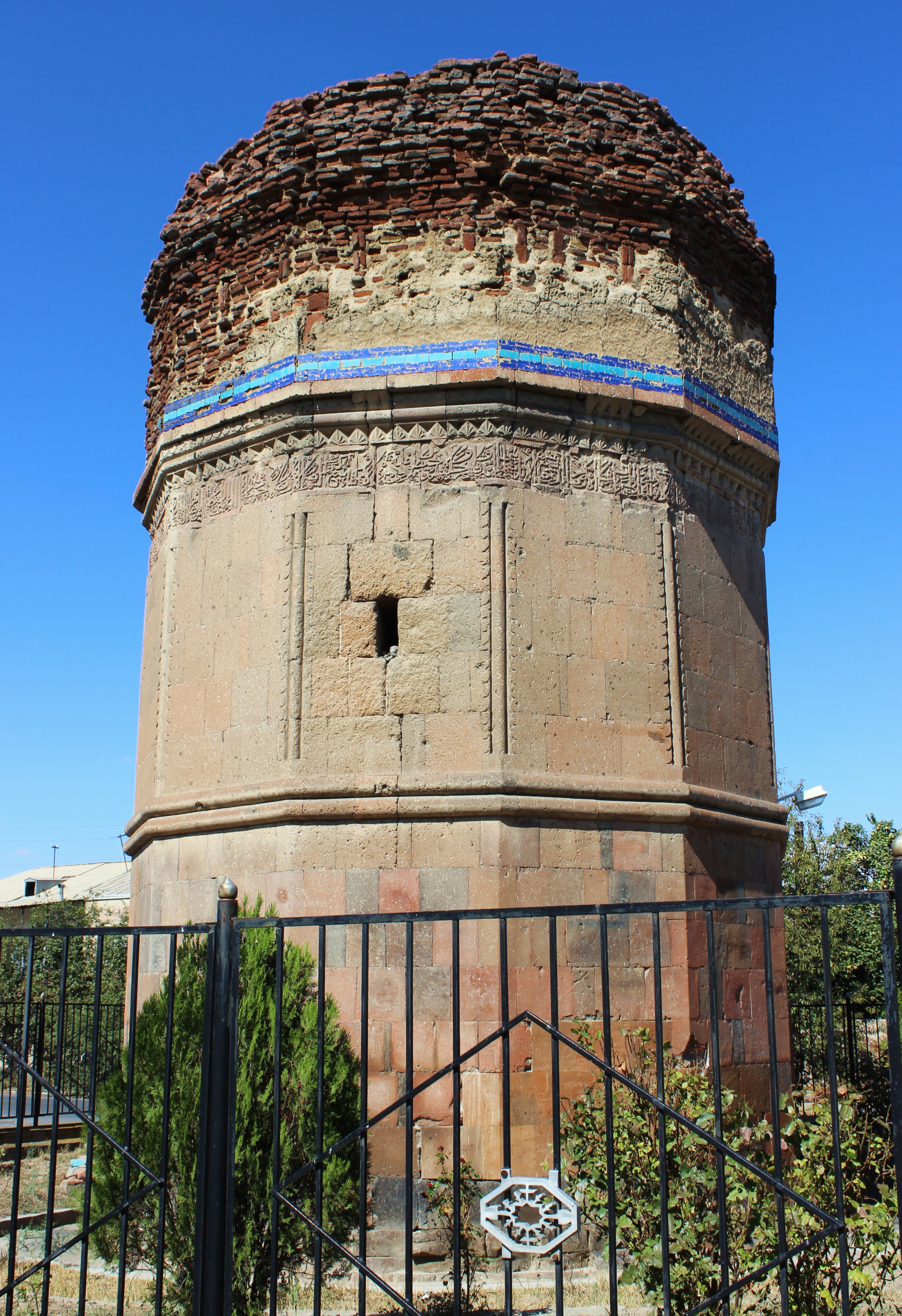
South façade of the mausoleum

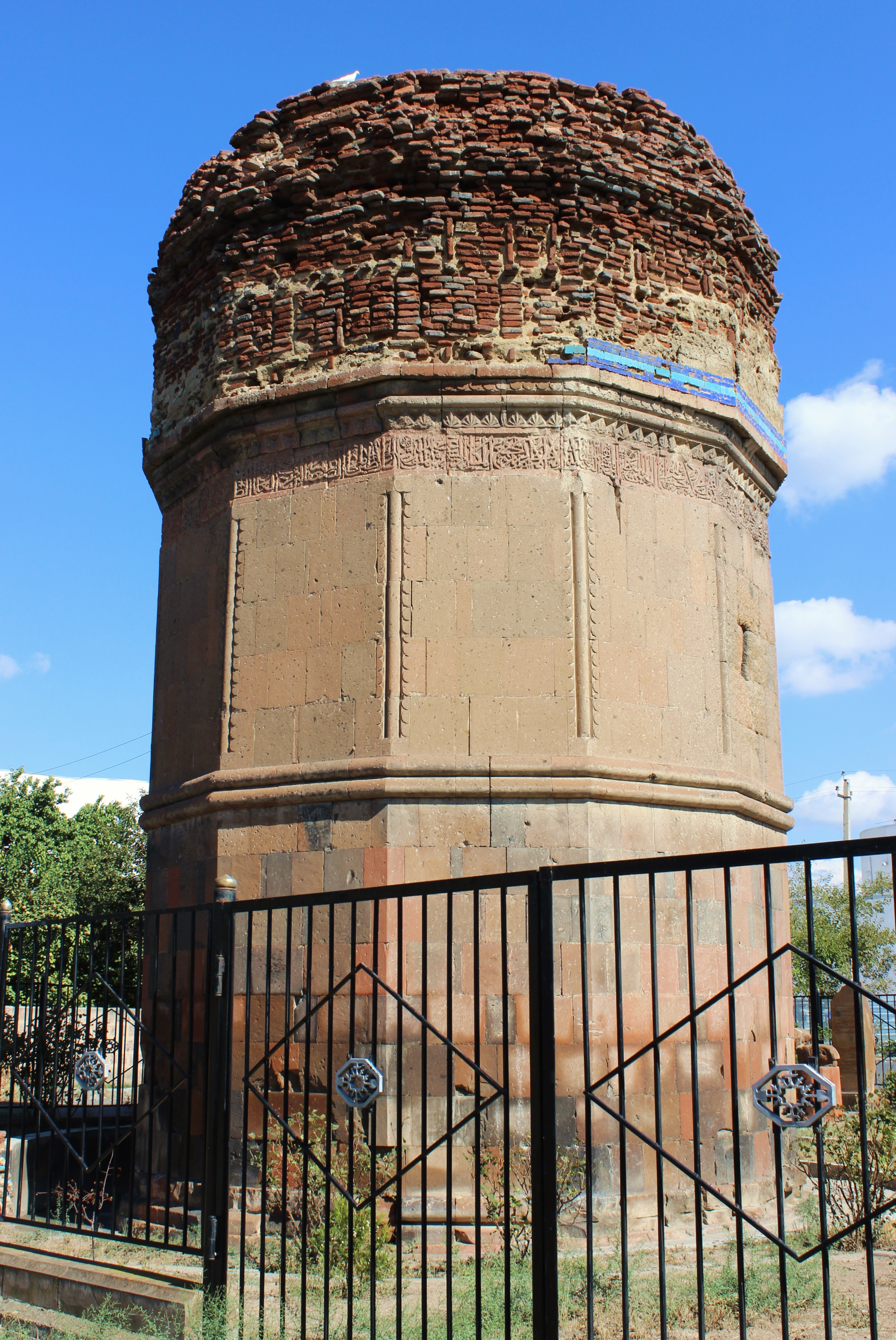
Southwest façade of the mausoleum

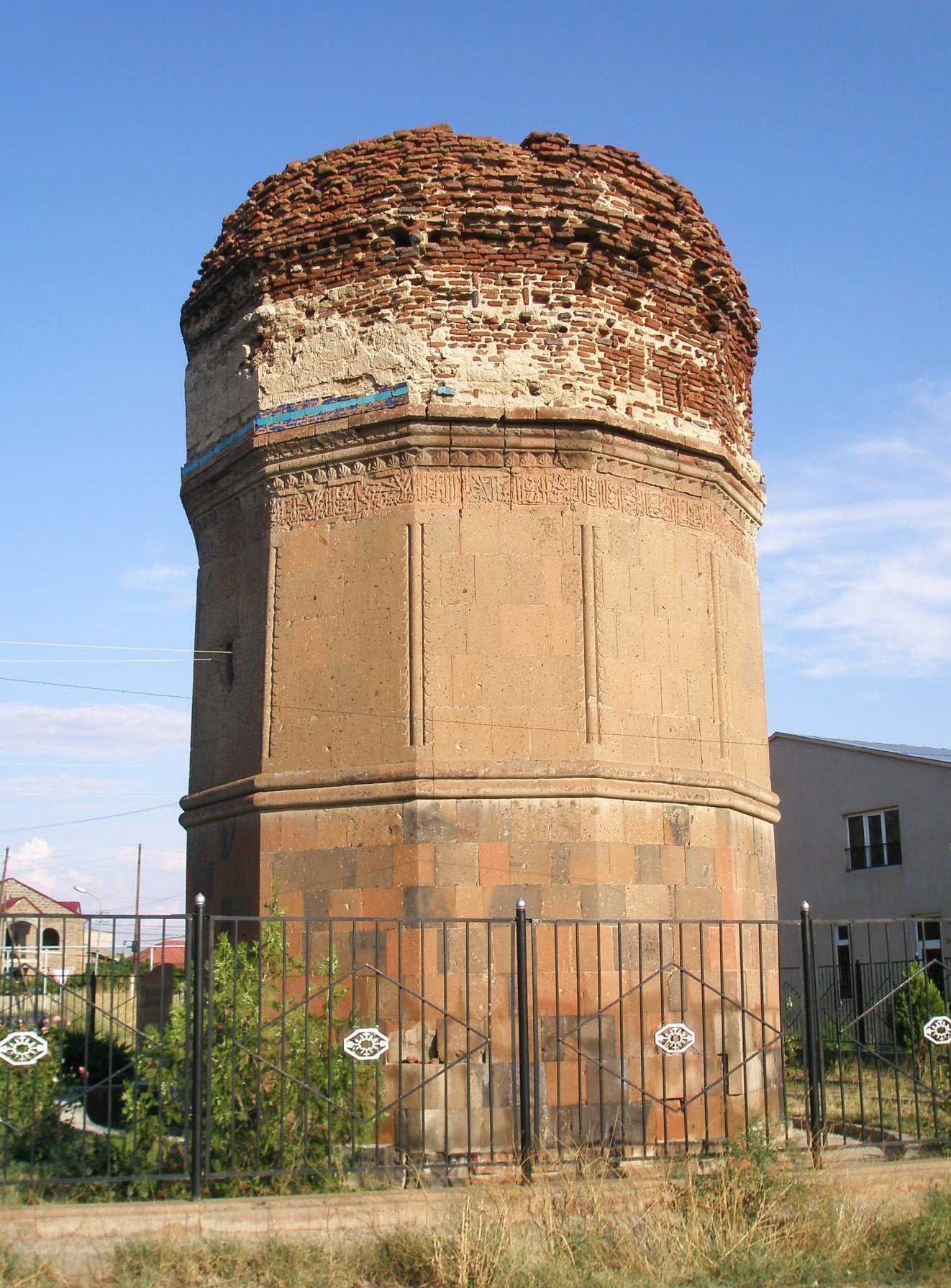
West façade of the mausoleum

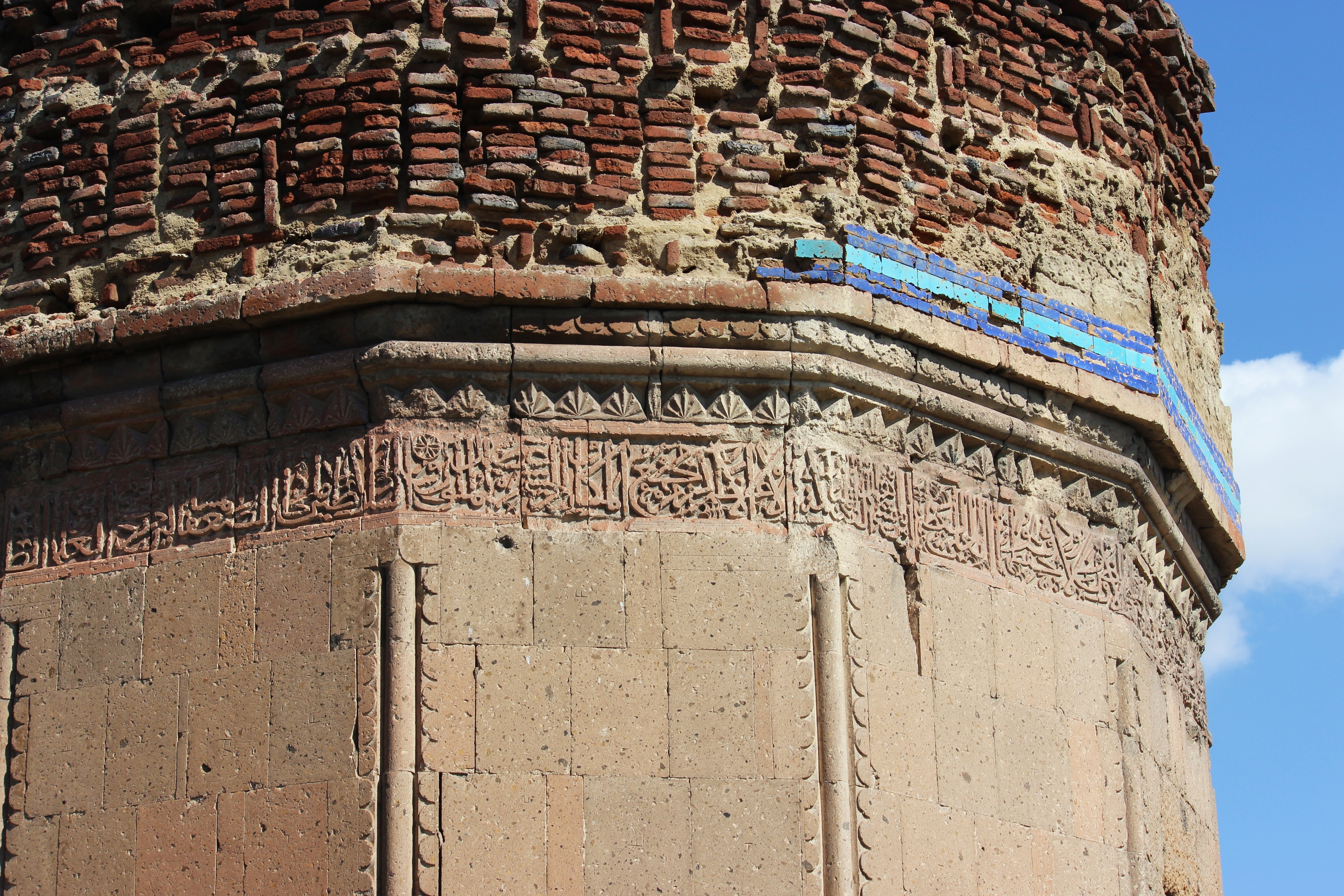
Detail of the inscription below the dome

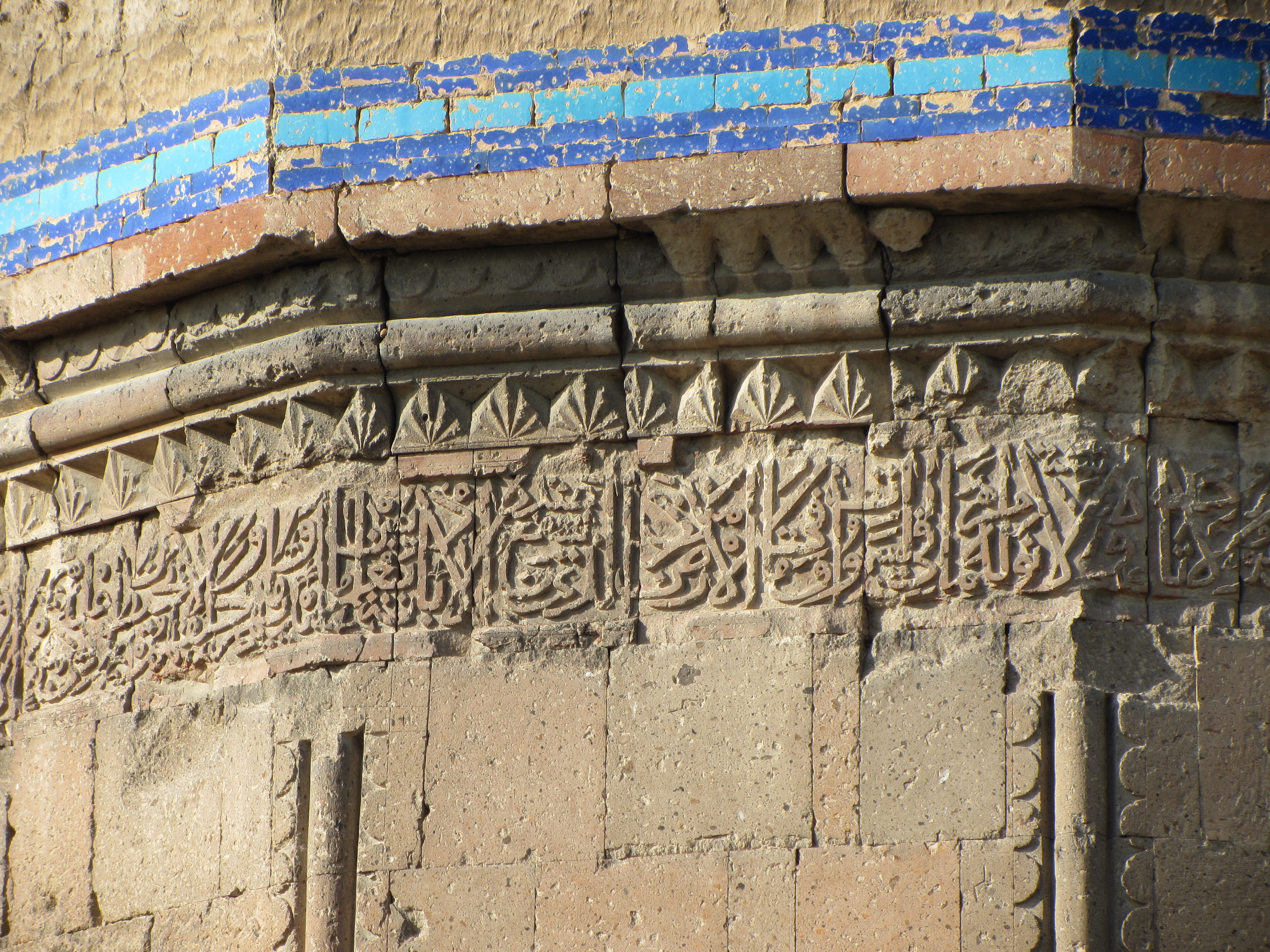
Detail of the inscription below the dome

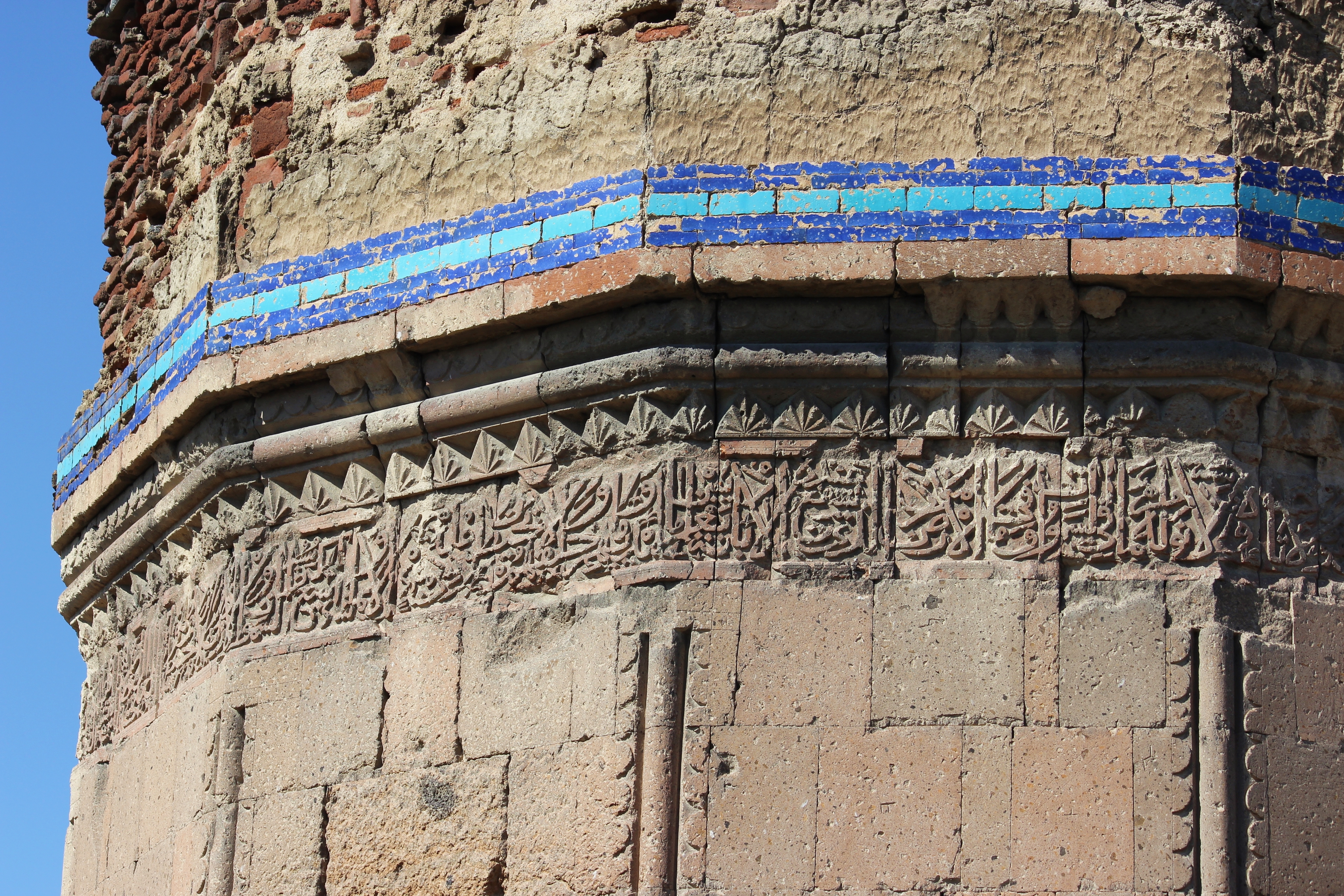
Detail of the inscription below the dome

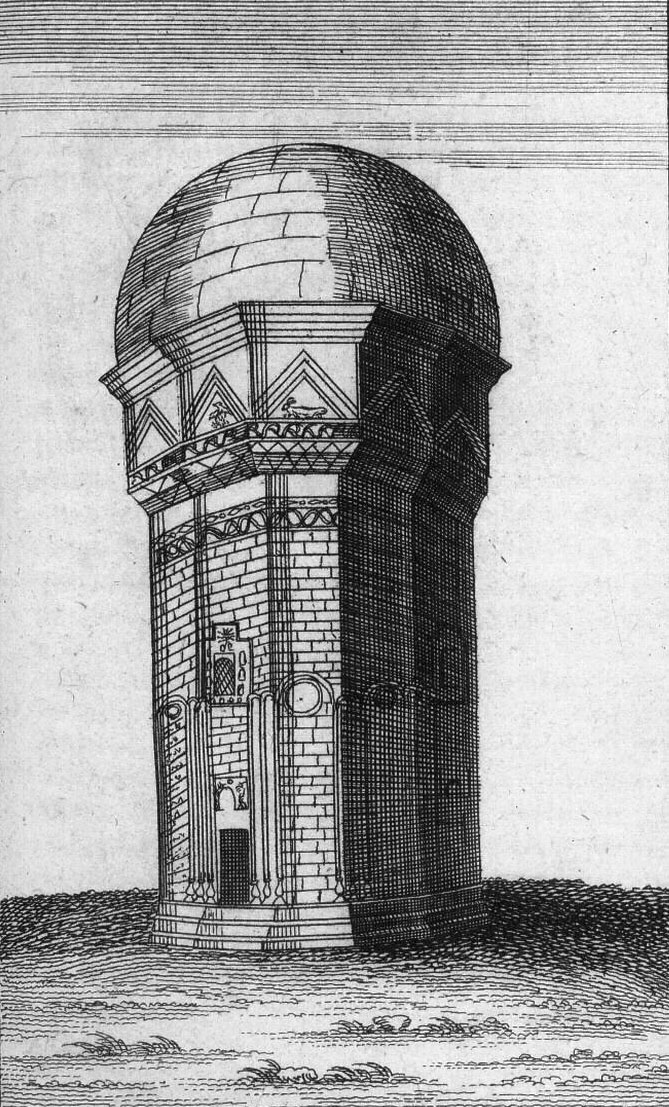
An old drawing of the mausoleum
