= Zaqatala =

Zaqatala may refer to:

- Zaqatala Rayon, a political subdivision in Azerbaijan
- Zaqatala (city), the principal city in the rayon
- Shaki-Zagatala Economic Region, an economic region in Azerbaijan
