= Argavand, Ararat =

Argavand Արգավանդ
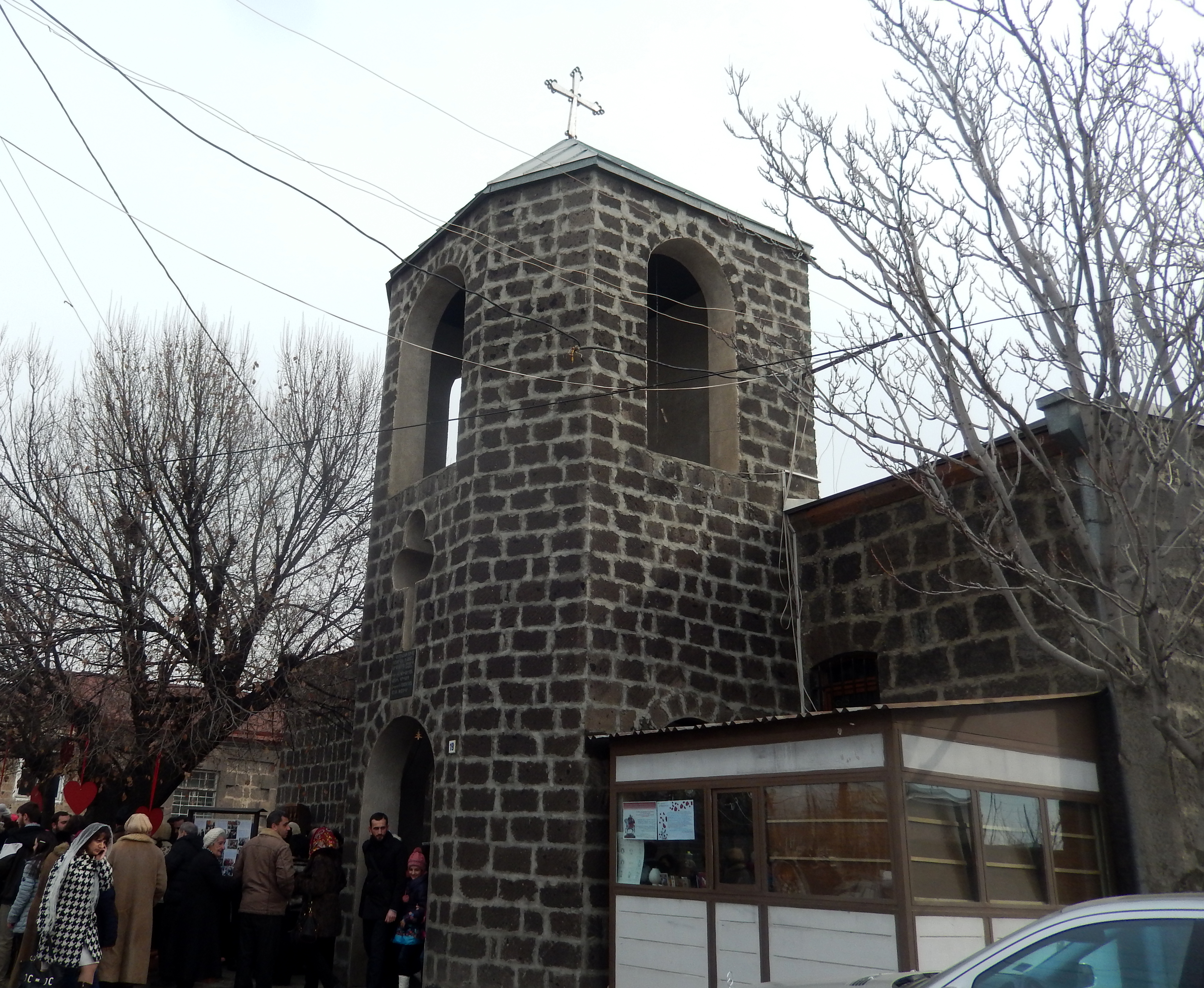
- St Sargis Church in Argavad

- Location within Armenia Location within Ararat
- Coordinates: 40°09′29″N 44°26′24″E
- Country: Armenia
- Province: Ararat
- Municipality: Masis
- Elevation: 902 m (2,959 ft)

Population (2011)
  - Total: 1,950
- Time zone: UTC+4
  - Summer (DST): UTC+5

Argavand (Armenian: Արգավանդ) is a village in the Masis Municipality of the Ararat province of Armenia.
