= Füzuli, Samukh =

Füzuli
- Municipality
- Location within Azerbaijan
- Coordinates: 40°47′57″N 46°24′01″E
- Country: Azerbaijan
- Rayon: Samukh

Population
  - Total: 1,389
- Time zone: UTC+4 (AZT)
  - Summer (DST): UTC+5 (AZT)

Füzuli is a village and municipality in the Samukh Rayon of Azerbaijan. It has a population of 1,389.
