= Füzuli, Shamkir =

Coordinates: 40.82205°N 46.13348°E

Füzuli is a village in the municipality of Yeni yol in the Shamkir Rayon of Azerbaijan.
