= Cicimli, Barda =

Cicimli
- Municipality
- Location within Azerbaijan Location within Karabakh Economic Region
- Coordinates: 40°28′N 47°03′E
- Country: Azerbaijan
- Rayon: Barda

Population
  - Total: 277
- Time zone: UTC+4 (AZT)
  - Summer (DST): UTC+5 (AZT)

Cicimli (until 2008, Cimcimli; also, Dzhidzhimli, and Dzhimdzhimly) is a village and municipality in the Barda Rayon of Azerbaijan. It has a population of 277.
