= Cicimli, Lachin =

Cicimli
- Location within Azerbaijan Location within East Zangezur Economic Region
- Coordinates: 39°30′43″N 46°30′59″E
- Country: Azerbaijan
- District: Lachin
- Time zone: UTC+4 (AZT)
  - Summer (DST): UTC+5 (AZT)

Cicimli (Jijimli) is a village in the Lachin District of Azerbaijan.

== History ==
The village was occupied by Armenian forces in 1992 during First Nagorno-Karabakh War. During its occupation, the village was renamed Vanotsa (Armenian: Վանոցա) and was made part of Kashatagh Province of the self-proclaimed Republic of Artsakh. The village was returned to Azerbaijan on 1 December per the 2020 Nagorno-Karabakh ceasefire agreement.

== Photo gallery ==
The tomb of Malik Ajdar in the village

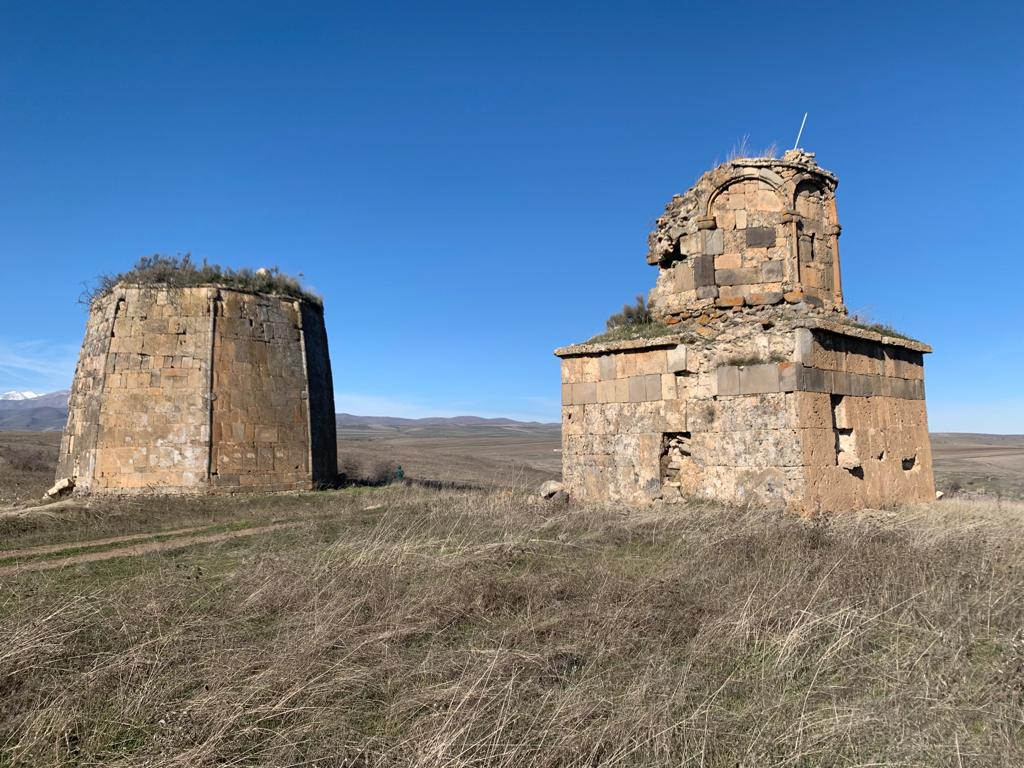

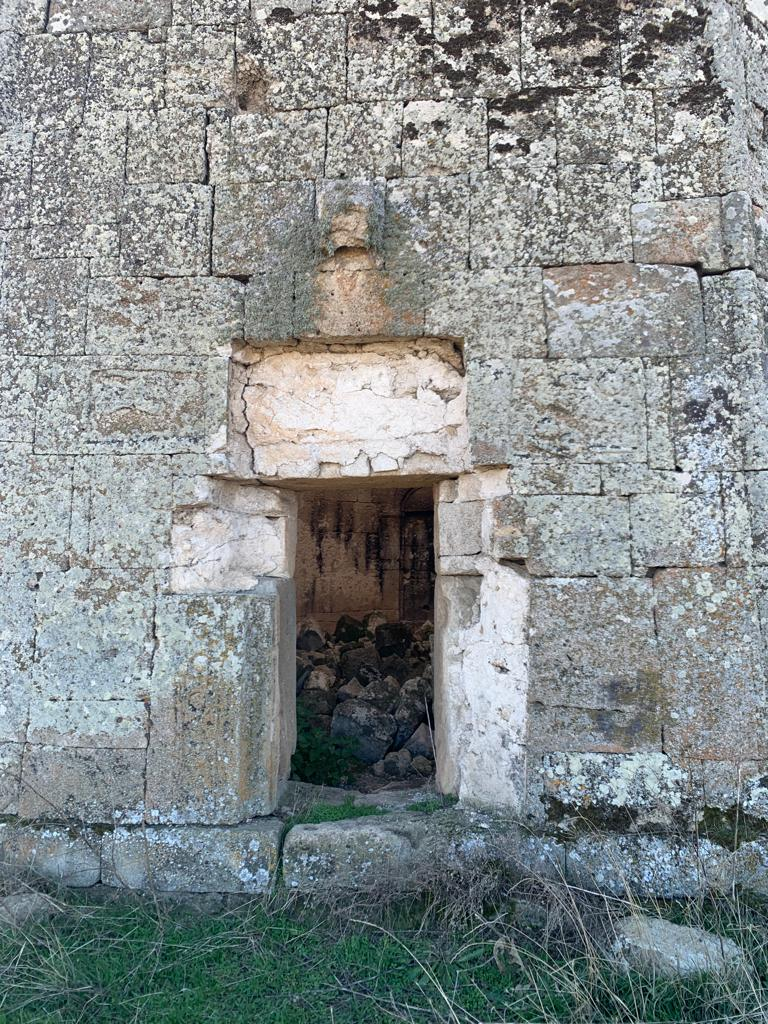

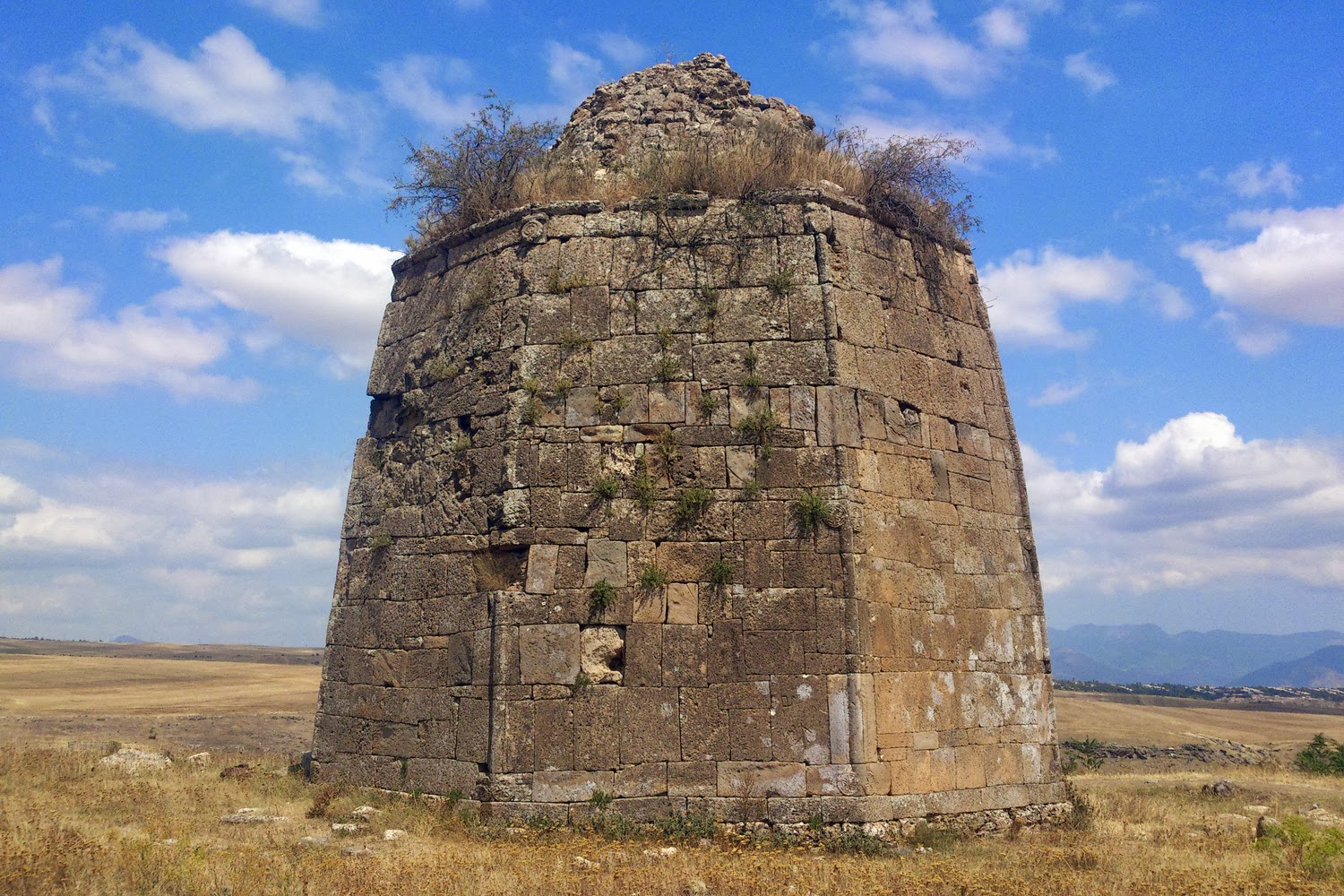

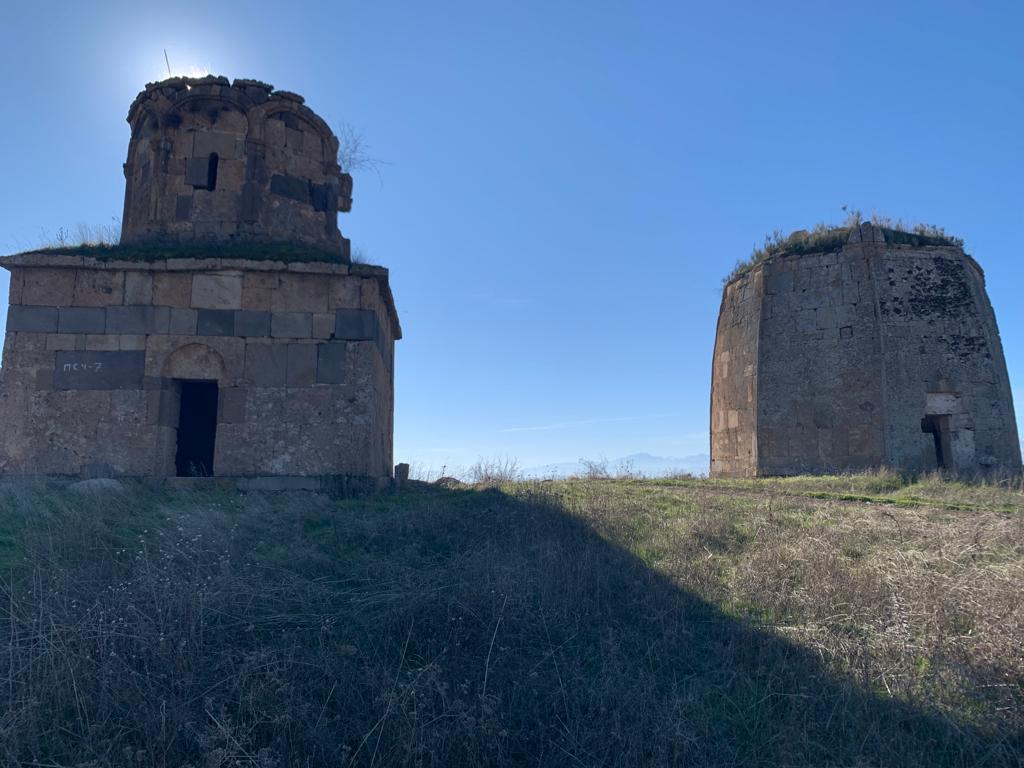

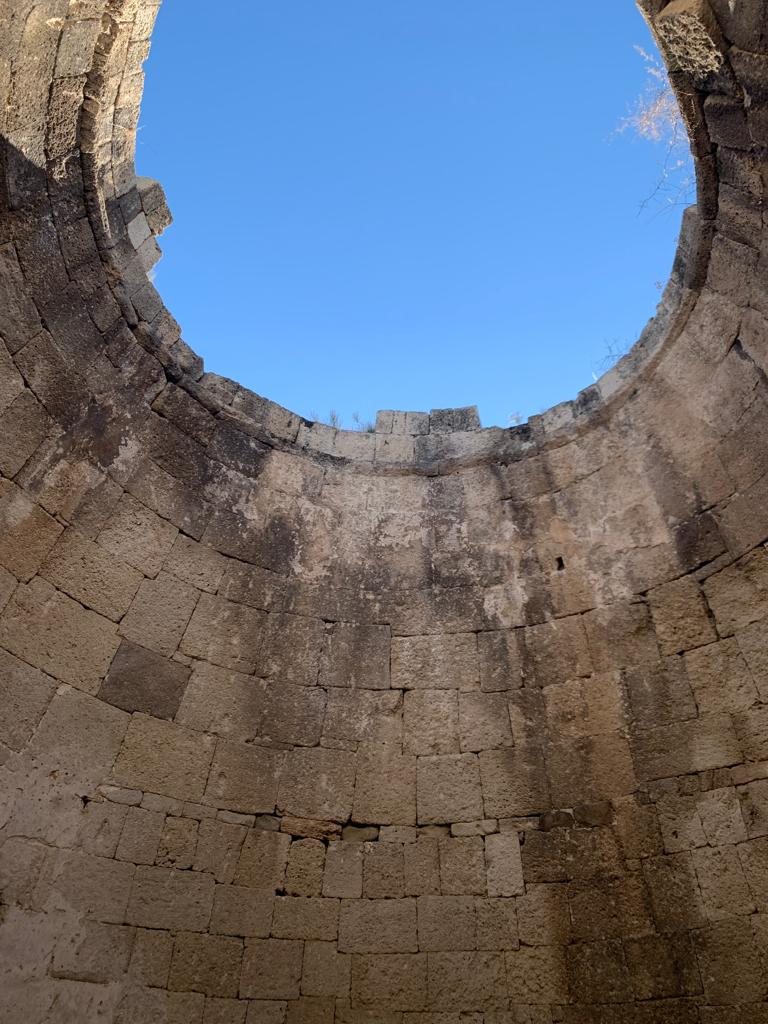

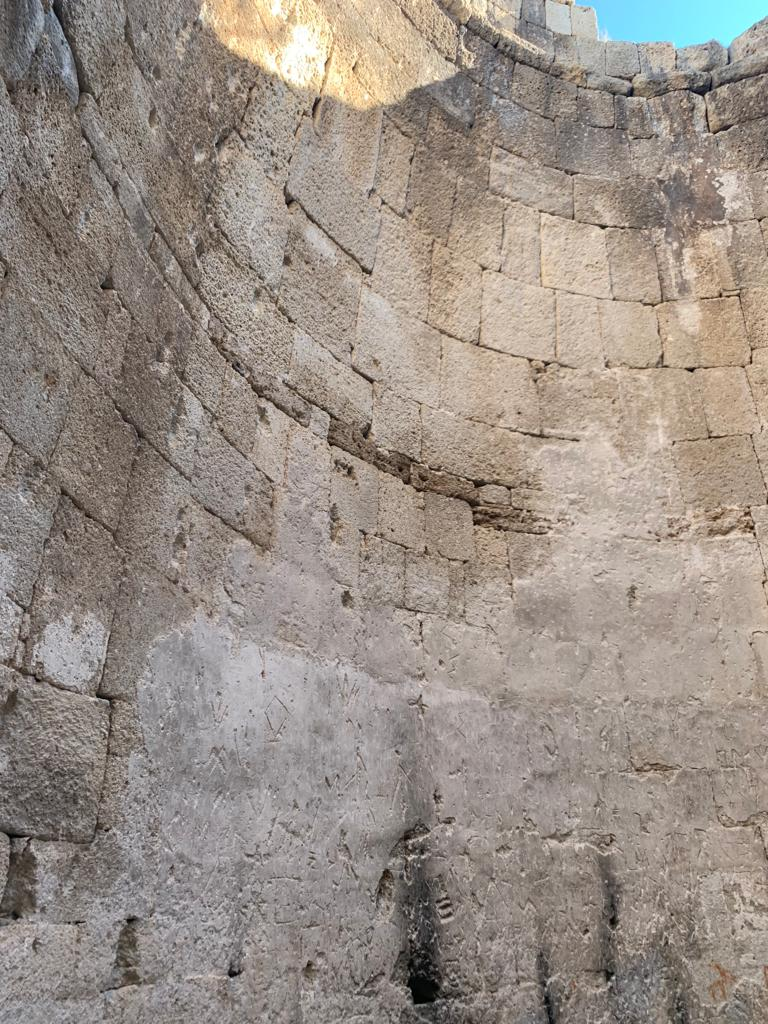
