= List of people from Uttar Pradesh =

This is a list of notable people from Uttar Pradesh, a state in India. The criteria of this list includes those who were born in the state of Uttar Pradesh and that part of the former United Provinces that now is part of the modern state of Uttar Pradesh.

== Deities and avatars ==
Jains Gods / Deities

- Rishabhanatha or Ādinath (birthplace: Ayodhya) 1st Tirthankara of Jainism and founder of Jainism
- Ajitnatha (birthplace: Ayodhya) 2nd Tirthankara of Jainism.
- Sambhavanatha (birthplace: Shravasti) 3rd Tirthankara of Jainism.
- Abhinandananatha (birthplace: Ayodhya) 4th Tirthankara of Jainism.
- Sumatinatha (birthplace: Ayodhya) 5th Tirthankara of Jainism.
- Padmaprabha (birthplace: Kaushambi) 6th Tirthankara of Jainism.
- Suparshvanatha (birthplace: Varanasi) 7th Tirthankara of Jainism.
- Chandraprabha (birthplace: Chandrawati, Varanasi) 8th Tirthankara of Jainism.
- Pushpadanta (birthplace: Khukhundoo) 9th Tirthankara of Jainism.
- Shreyansnath (birthplace: Sarnath), 11th Tirthankara of Jainism
- Vimalanatha (birthplace: Kampilya), 13th Tirthankara of Jainism
- Anantanatha (birthplace: Ayodhya), 14th Tirthankara of Jainism
- Dharmanatha (birthplace: Ratnapuri), 15th Tirthankara of Jainism
- Shantinath (birthplace: Hastinapur), 16th Tirthankara of Jainism
- Kunthunath (birthplace: Hastinapur), 17th Tirthankara of Jainism
- Aranath (birthplace: Hastinapur), 18th Tirthankara of Jainism
- Neminath (birthplace: Mathura), 22nd Tirthankara of Jainism
- Parsvanatha (birthplace: Varanasi), 23rd Tirthankara of Jainism

Hindu gods / deities

- Rama (birthplace: Ayodhya), legendary or historical king of ancient India; in Hinduism, he is considered to be the seventh avatar of Vishnu
- Lakshmana (birthplace: Ayodhya), brother and close companion of Rama; a hero in the epic Ramayana
- Lord Shree Krishna (birthplace: Mathura) deity worshiped across many traditions of Hinduism
- Parashuram (birthplace: Ghazipur), was an avatar of Vishnu
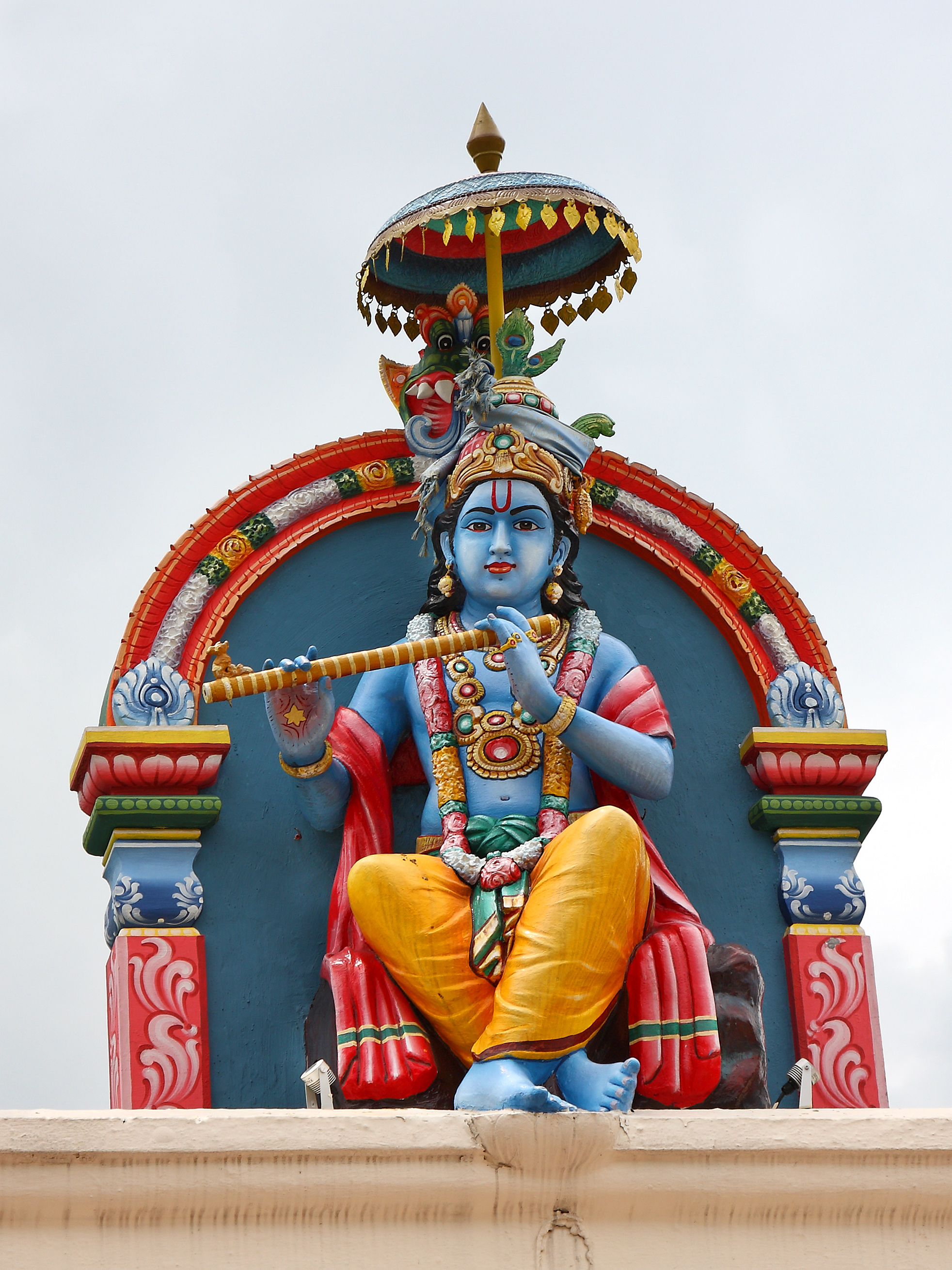
Lord Shree Krishna statue at the Sri Mariamman Temple (Singapore)

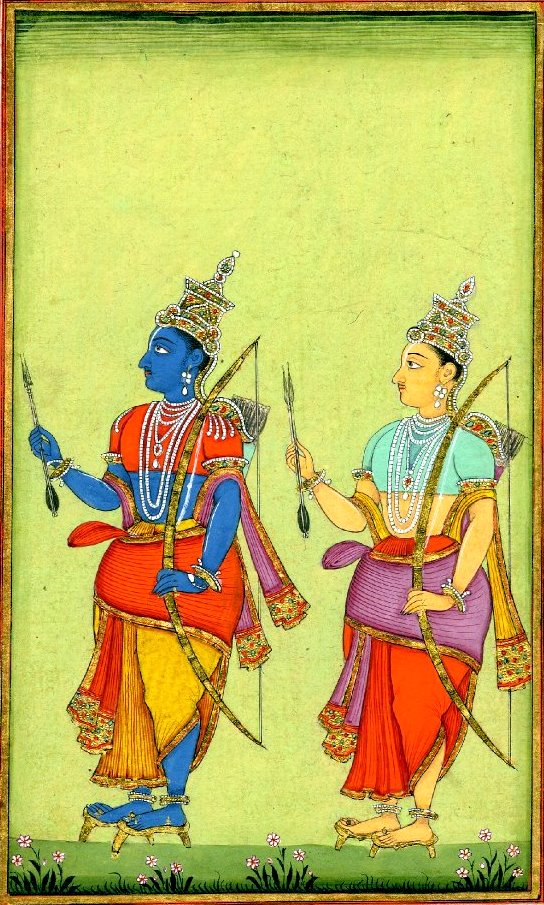
L to R: Lord Rama and Lakshmana

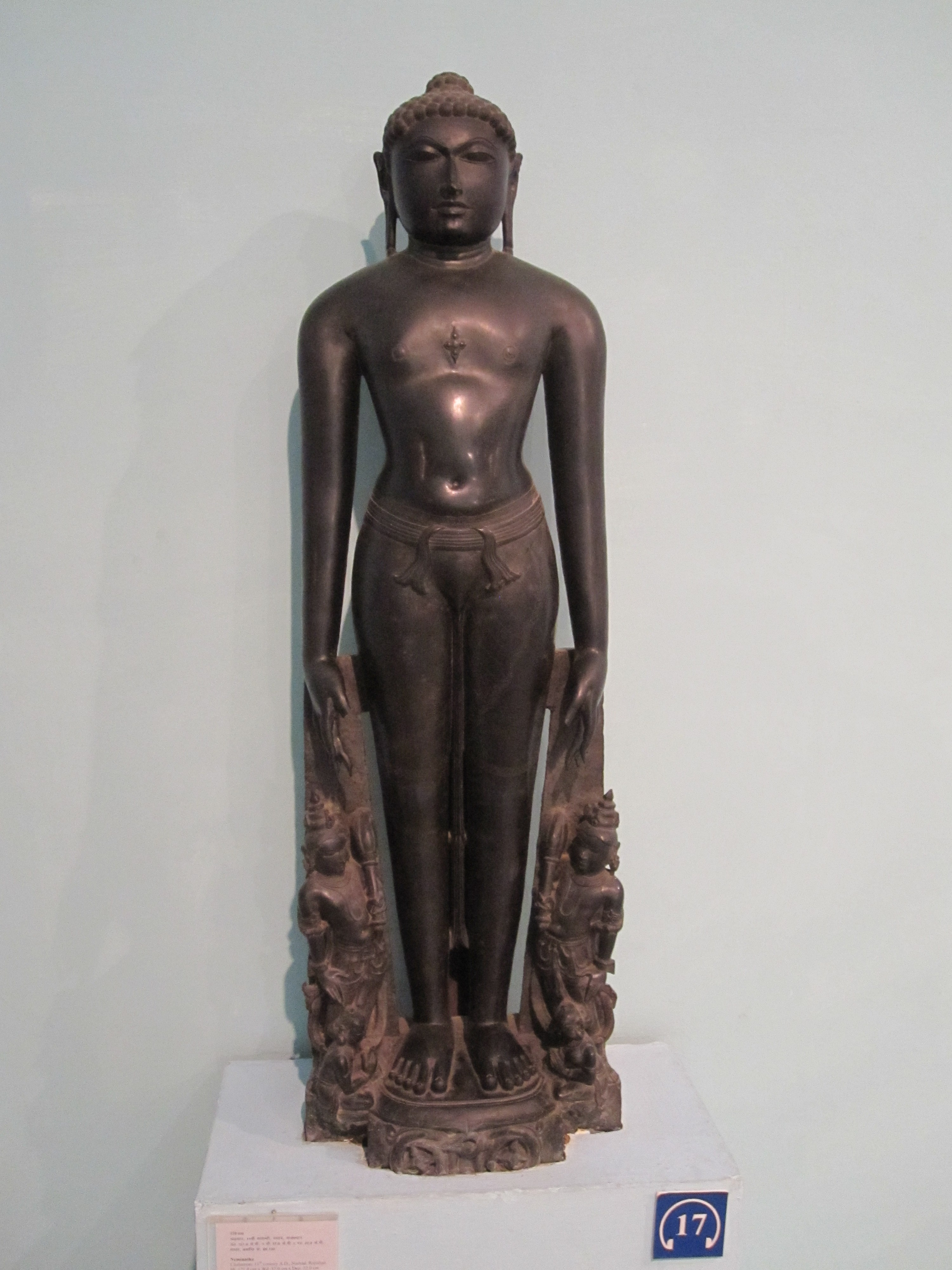
Neminatha (stone). Chahaman, 11th century AD, Narhad, Rajasthan

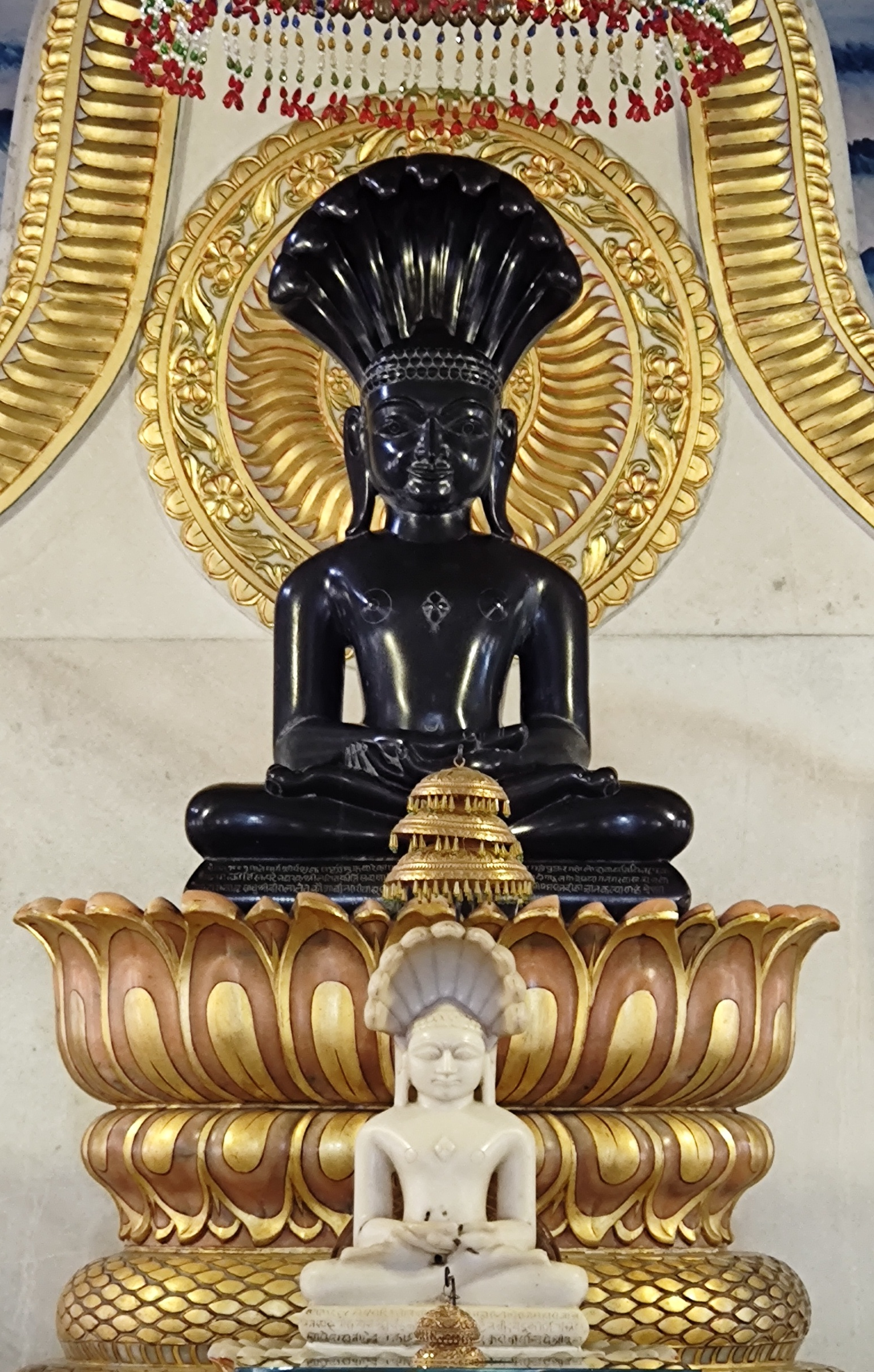
Parsvanatha statue in Bhelupur Jain temple, Varanasi

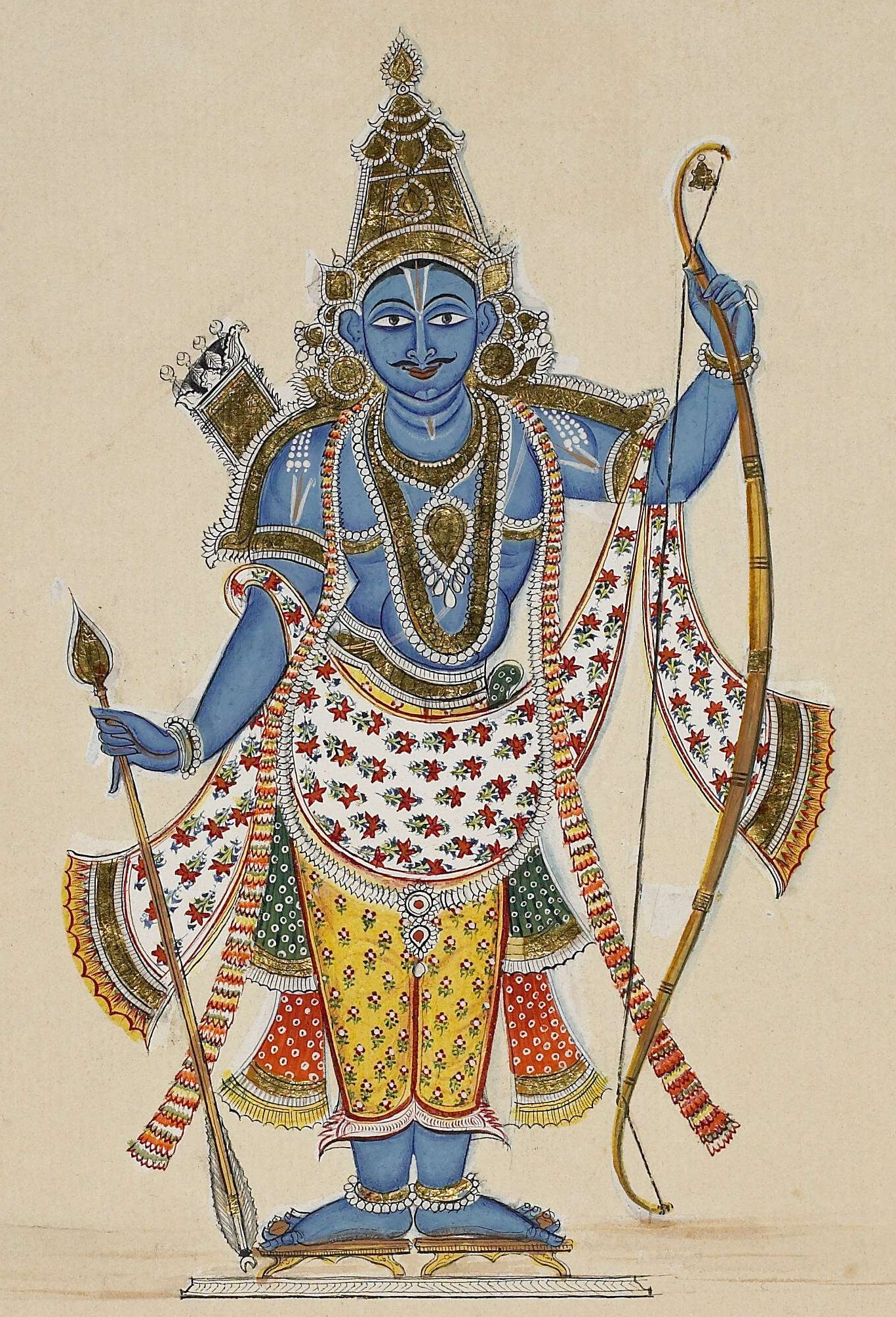
Lord Rama with arrows

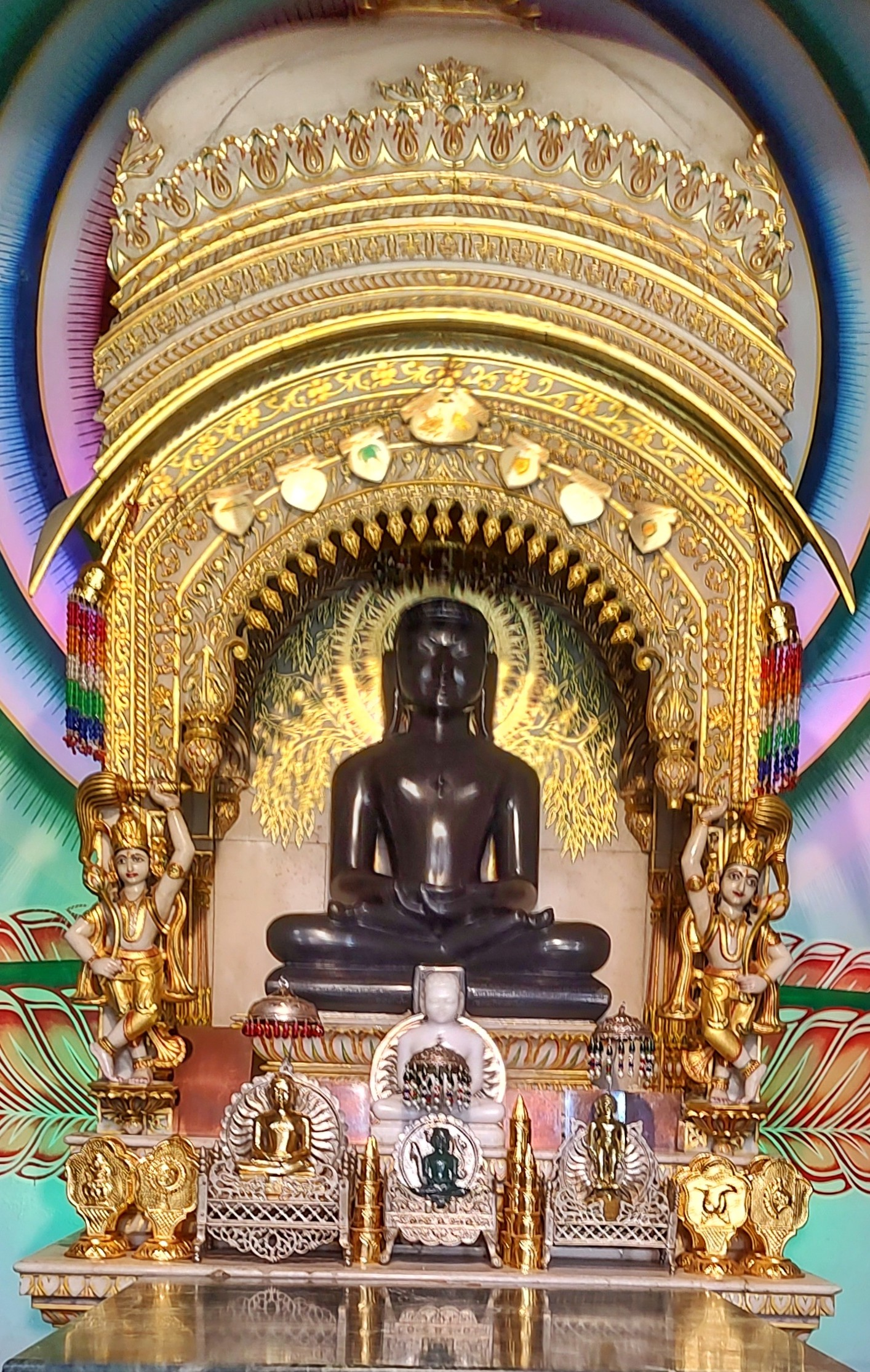
Shreyansanatha at Sarnath Jain Tirth

== Authors of the great epics ==
- Bhrigu (birthplace: Ballia), one of the seven great sages, the Saptarshis, one of the Prajapatis created by Brahma
- Sur (birthplace: Mathura), saint, poet and musician
- Tulsidas (Ramayana: Chitrakoot), Awadhi poet and philosopher; wrote Rāmacaritamānasa ("The Lake of the Deeds of Rama"), an epic devoted to Lord Rama
- Vyasa, central and much revered figure in the majority of Hindu traditions; authored Mahabharata
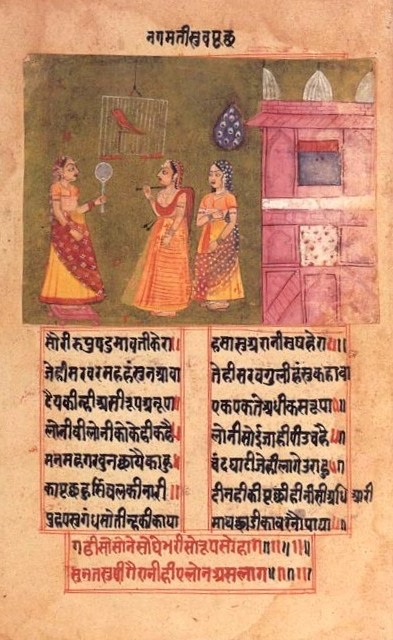
Malik Mohammed Jayasi

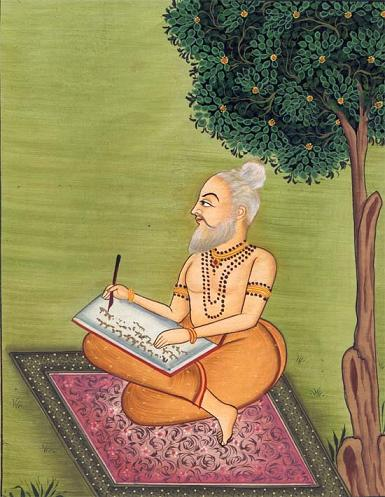
Valmiki

== Yogis, Sufi poets and mystics ==
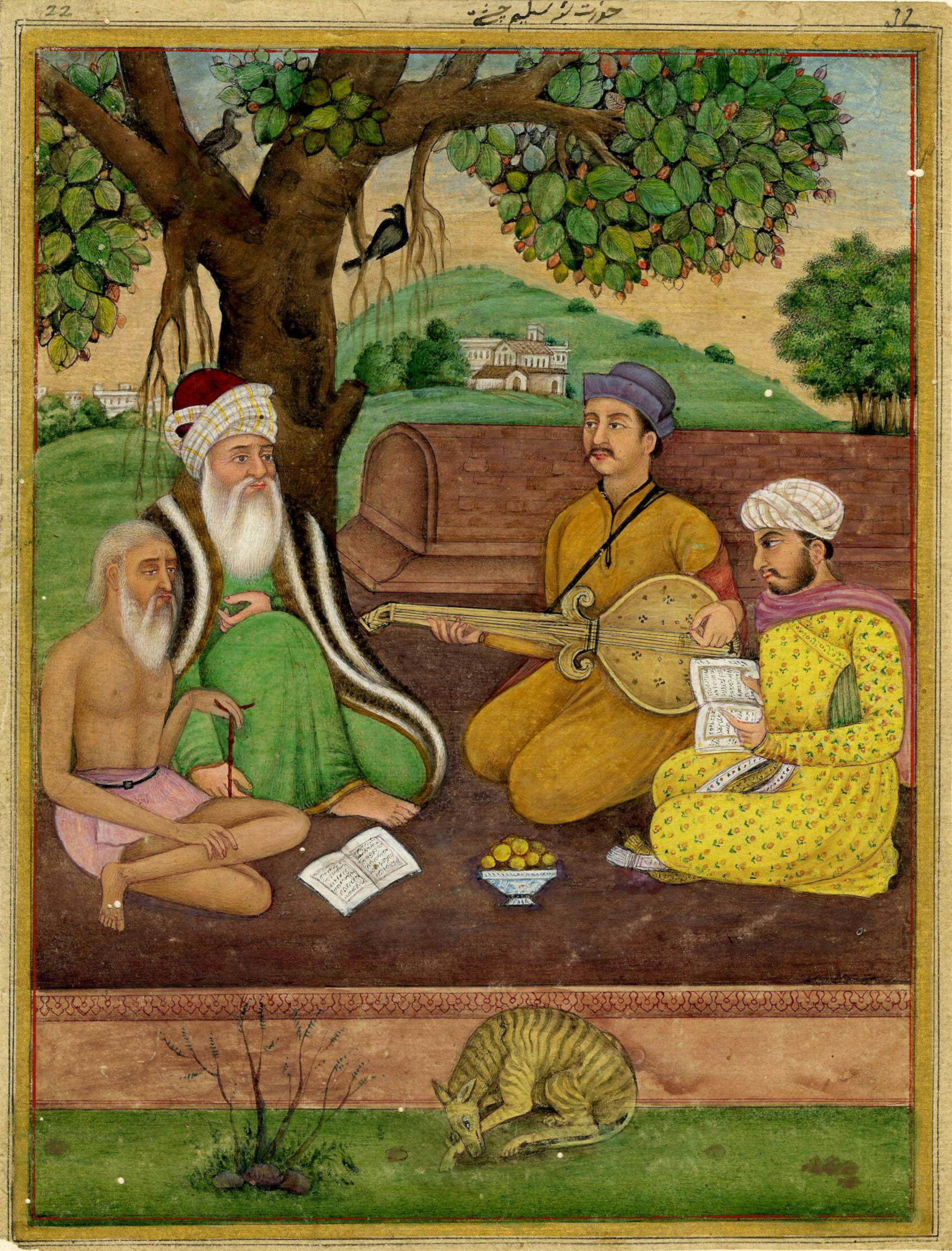
Salím Chishtí

- Nizamuddin Auliya, Sufi saint, born in Budaun
- Bharat Bhushan, only Padmashri recipient in yoga; founder President of Mokshayatan International Yogashram, Saharanpur
- Salim Chishti, Sufi saint of Fatehpur Sikri, Agra
- Kabir, poet and saint Varanasi
- Amir Khusro, Sufi mystic, one of the iconic figures in the cultural history of the Indian subcontinent
- Ghazi Saiyyad Salar Masud, Gazi Miya of Bahraich
- Paramahansa Yogananda, Yogi and Guru who introduced Yoga in the West. Born in Gorakhpur in 1893.

== Poet-saints and religious figures ==
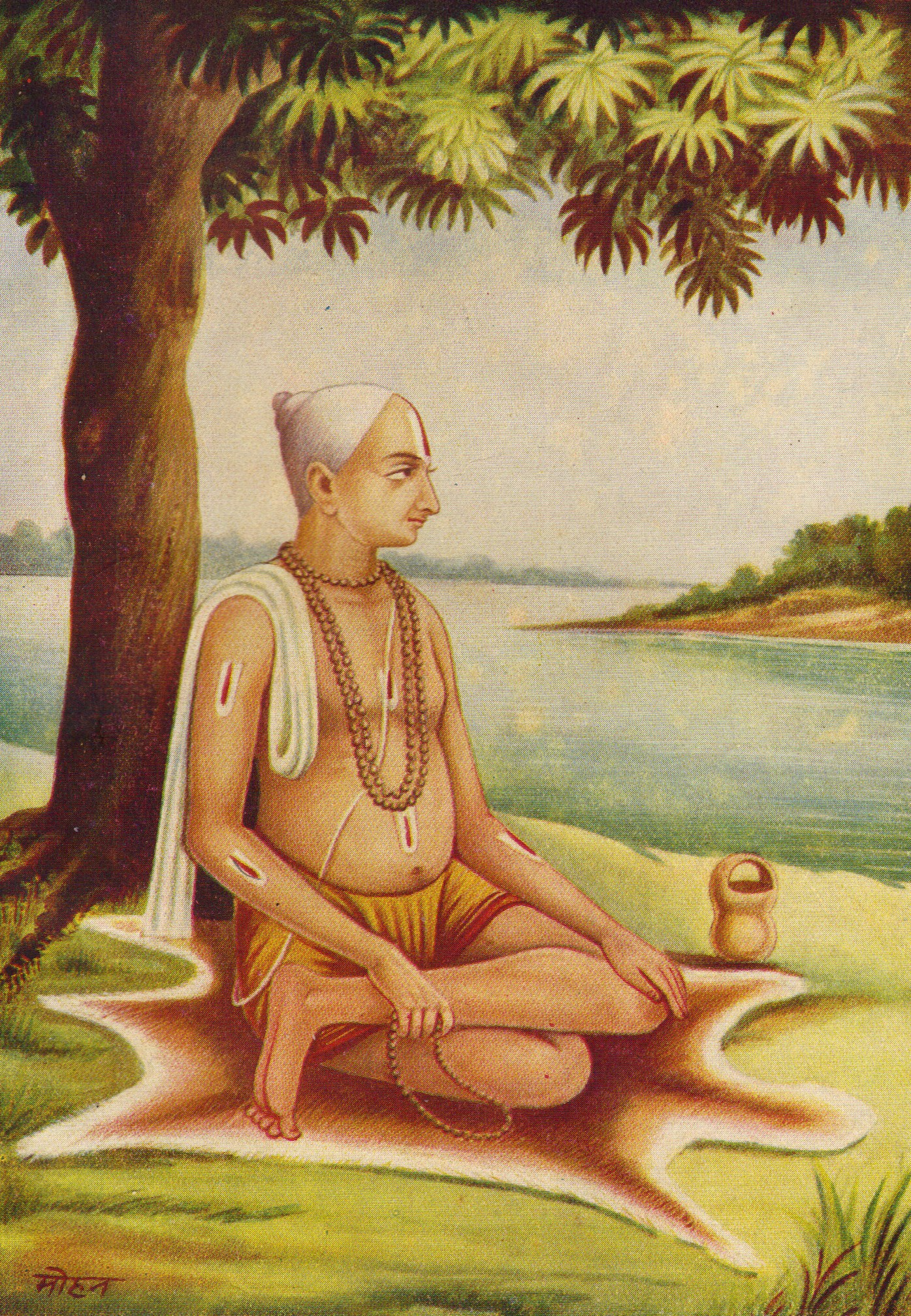
Goswami Tulsidas

Hindu scholars

- Devraha Baba, Yogi Allahabad
- Narottama Dasa
- Shrivatsa Goswami, Indologist and Gaudiya Vaishnava leader
- Swami Karpatri, teacher of Advaita, popularly known as Dharma Samrat, Gorakhpur
- Jagadguru Rāmabhadrācārya, Vaishnava scholar and Sanskrit commentator on the Prasthanatrayi, Jaunpur.
- Ramanand, founder of the Rāmānandī sect Prayag (in modern Allahabad)
- Raskhan
- Sant Ravidas, poet and saint, Varanasi
- Shiv Dayal Singh, founder and first guru of Radha Soami sect, Agra
- Sur, blind Hindu poet, saint and musician born in Runkata near Agra
- Swaminarayan, founder of the Swaminarayan sect, Gonda
- Tulsidas, composer of the Ramcharitmanas

Islam scholars

- Mulla Mahmud Jaunpuri (1606–1651), natural philosopher
- Karamat Ali Jaunpuri (1800-1873), Islamic scholar
- Hafiz Ahmad Jaunpuri (1834-1899), Islamic scholar
- Abdul Awwal Jaunpuri (1867–1921), Islamic scholar
- Abdur Rab Jaunpuri (1875–1935), Islamic scholar
- Majid Ali Jaunpuri (died 1935), Islamic scholar
- Syed Rashid Ahmed Jaunpuri (1889–2001), Sufi saint
- Muhammad Yunus Jaunpuri (1937–2017), Islamic scholar
- Malik Mohammad Jayasi

== Rulers and generals ==
=== Ancient ===
- Ashoka, (Sanskrit pronunciation: [ɐˈʃo:kɐ], IAST: Aśoka; c. 304 – 232 BCE), popularly known as Ashoka the Great, was the third Mauryan Emperor of Magadha in the Indian subcontinent during c. 268 to 232 BCE.
- Brahmamitra
- Chandragupta II (c. 375-415), also known by his title Vikramaditya, as well as Chandragupta Vikramaditya, was the third ruler of the Gupta Empire in India.
- Keśin Dālbhya, (or Dārbhya) was a king of Panchala during the Late Vedic period, most likely between c. 900 and 750 BCE. He is mentioned prominently in the Taittiriya and Jaiminiya Brahmanas.
- Gomitra
- Gomitra II
- Pravahana Jaivali, was a king of Panchala during the Late Vedic period (8th or 7th century BCE), mentioned in the Brihadaranyaka Upanishad (Vi.ii.9-13) and the Chandogya Upanishad (V.4-8). Like King Ajatashatru of Kashi and King Asvapati Kaikeya of Madra, he is depicted as a major Hindu philosopher-king.
- Kumaragupta I (c. 415–455 CE), an emperor of the Gupta Empire of Ancient India. A son of the Gupta emperor Chandragupta II and Queen Dhruvadevi, he seems to have maintained control of his inherited territory, which extended from Gujarat in the west to Bengal region in the east.
- Chandragupta Maurya, (Note: Pāli:चन्दगुत्त मोरीय Candagutta Mōrīya; Sanskrit: चन्द्रगुप्त मौर्य Candragupta Maurya; Ancient Greek: Σανδράκοπτος Sandrákoptos Σανδράκοττος Sandrákottos Ανδροκόττος Androkóttos) (350-295 BCE) was the founder of the Maurya Empire, a geographically-extensive empire based in Magadha.
- Pasenadi, (c. 6th century BCE) was an Aikṣvāka ruler of Kosala. Sāvatthī was his capital. He succeeded after Sanjaya Mahākosala.
- Samudragupta, (c. 335–375 CE) was the second emperor of the Gupta Empire of ancient India, and is regarded among the greatest rulers of India. As a son of the Gupta emperor Chandragupta I and the Licchavi princess Kumaradevi, he greatly expanded his dynasty's political and military power.
- Virudhaka, was a king of Kosala during the lifetime of the Buddha.

=== Medieval ===
- Harsha, (IAST Harṣa-vardhana; c. 590–647 CE) was a Pushyabhuti emperor who ruled northern India from 606 to 647 CE. He was the son of Prabhakaravardhana who had defeated the Alchon Hun invaders, and the younger brother of Rajyavardhana, a king of Thanesar, present-day Haryana.
- Jahangir, (31 August 1569 – 28 October 1627), known by his imperial name Jahangir (Persian pronunciation: [d͡ʒahɑːn'giːr]; lit. 'Conqueror of the World'), was the fourth Mughal Emperor, who ruled from 1605 until his death in 1627.
- Rajyavardhana, also known as Rajya Vardhan, was the eldest son of Prabhakarvardhana and member of the Pushyabhuti dynasty. He ascended the throne after his father's death and was succeeded by his younger brother, Harsha.

=== Modern ===
- Rani of Jhansi, the Rani of Jhansi (19 November 1828 — 18 June 1858), was the Maharani consort of the princely state of Jhansi in Maratha Empire from 1843 to 1853 by marriage to Maharaja Gangadhar Rao Newalkar.

==== Nawab of Awadh ====
- Shuja-ud-Daula, (b. 19 January 1732 – d. 26 January 1775) was the Subedar and Nawab of Oudh and the Vizier of Delhi from 5 October 1754 to 26 January 1775.
- Asaf-Ud-Dowlah, (23 September 1748 – 21 September 1797) was the Nawab wazir of Oudh ratified by Shah Alam II, from 26 January 1775 to 21 September 1797, and the son of Shuja-ud-Dowlah.
- Wajid Ali Shah, (30 July 1822 – 1 September 1887) was the eleventh and last King of Awadh, holding the position for 9 years, from 13 February 1847 to 11 February 1856.

==== Banaras state ====
- Balwant Singh, His eldest son, Rafa'at wa Awal-i-Martabat Raja Sri Balwant Singh Sahib Bahadur Bhumihar who succeeded his father as Raja of Kaswar and Nazim of Benares in 1738.
- Maharaja Chait Singh, commonly known as Chait Singh, a Bhumihar king was a ruler of Kingdom of Benaras in northern India.
- Prabhu Narayan Singh, GCSI GCIE (26 November 1855 – 4 August 1931) was ruler of the Benares State (Royal House of Benares), an Indian princely state, from 1889 to 1931.
- Vibhuti Narayan Singh, (5 November 1927 – 25 December 2000) was the king of Benares, a city considered holy, located in the Indian state of Uttar Pradesh.

==== Kohra estate ====
- Babu Himmat Sah
- Babu Bhoop Singh

== Independence Fighters ==
=== 18th century ===
- Maharaja Chait Singh, ruler of Banaras, one of the earliest rebel against Company rule.

=== Indian Rebellion of 1857 ===
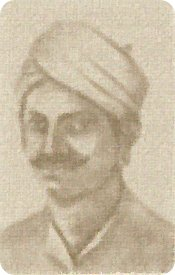
Mangal Pandey

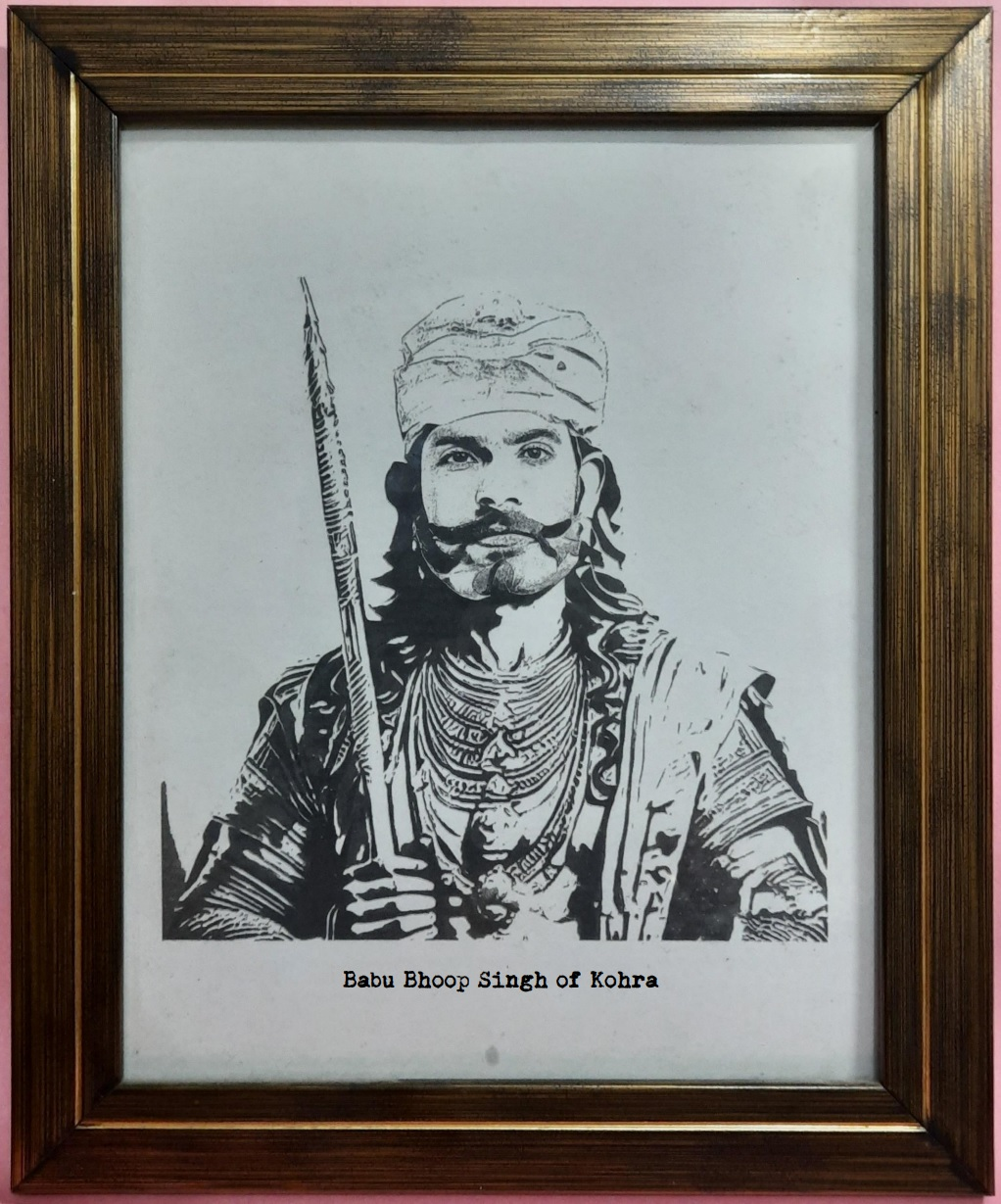
Babu Bhoop Singh of Kohra (estate), Leader in the Indian Rebellion of 1857

- Maulvi Liaquat Ali, Indian independence fighter of 1857 from Allahabad; captured the Khusro Bagh in Allahabad and declared the independence of India
- Rao Umrao Singh Bhati, ruler of Dadri and a leader of 1857 rebellion
- Banke Chamar, was the freedom fighter of the 1857 revolution who was leading the revolution from Jaunpur.
- Dhan Singh Gurjar, main freedom fighter of 1857 revolt from Meerut
- Jhalkari Bai Koli, Great Indian freedom fighter of 1857; fought against British rule; Commander of Army of Jhansi
- Bakht Khan, nominal commander-in-chief of Indian rebel forces in the Indian Rebellion of 1857
- Rani Lakshmibai, Rani (Queen) of Jhansi
- Begum Hazrat Mahal, widow of the last Nawab of Awadh; Indian independence fighter in Indian Rebellion of 1857
- Mangal Pandey, one of the earliest independence fighters of 1857.
- Amar Shahid Bandhu Singh, fighter in Indian Rebellion of 1857, he was from Dumari Riyasat of Gorakhpur
- Babu Bhoop Singh, ruler of Kohra (estate) and a leader of Indian Rebellion of 1857
- Lal Pratap Singh, fighter in Indian Rebellion of 1857 and Yuvraj of Kalakankar
- Rao Kadam Singh, freedom fighter; elected by his Gurjar clansmen as their leader to fight against the British forces during the Indian Rebellion of 1857

=== Later 19th and 20th centuries ===
- Laxmi Raman Acharya, freedom fighter accused of the Agra Conspiracy case
- Bhagwan Ahir, lead Chaura-chauri incident
- Asaf Ali, independence fighter
- Maulana Mohammad Ali, independence fighter
- Maulana Shaukat Ali, independence fighter
- Mukhtar Ahmed Ansari, independence fighter, Ghazipur
- Chandra Shekhar Azad, leader of Hindustan Socialist Republican Association
- Ram Prasad Bismil Indian independence fighter and socialist (Kakori conspiracy)
- Acharya Narendra Dev, socialist
- Genda Lal Dixit (30 November 1888 – 21 December 1920) was an Indian revolutionary who led the Shivaji Samiti group of freedom fighters against the British Raj.
- Ashfaqullah Khan of Kakori, independence fighter; member of Hindustan Socialist Republican Association; close associate of Bhagat Singh and Chandrashekhar Azad
- Rafi Ahmed Kidwai, Indian independence fighter and socialist
- Rajendra Lahiri, independence fighter
- Ram Manohar Lohia, socialist
- Hasrat Mohani, independence fighter and poet
- Chittu Pandey, independence fighter
- Govind Ballabh Pant, Indian independence fighter and politician; Chief Minister of the United Provinces; Bharat Ratna recipient
- Vijay Singh Pathik
- Raja Mahendra Pratap, King of Hathras Princely State, known as Aryan Peshwa
- Swami Sahajanand Saraswati, freedom fighter.
- Mahavir Singh Rathore, independence fighter; member of Naujawan Bharat Sabha who helped Bhagat Singh escape
- Roshan Singh, (Kakori conspiracy) independence fighter
- Purushottam Das Tandon, independence fighter
- Vishwambhar Dayalu Tripathi (5 October 1899 – 18 November 1959) was an Indian lawyer and politician.
- Mahavir Tyagi, independence fighter
- Munishwar Dutt Upadhyay of Pratapgarh, Indian Independence fighter; two time Member of Parliament
- Ganesh Shankar Vidyarthi, independence fighter, journalist

== Award winners ==
=== Param Vir Chakra ===
- Company Quartermaster Havildar Abdul Hamid, Ghazipur
- Captain Manoj Kumar Pandey
- Naik Jadu Nath Singh Rathore Shahjahan pur, fighter of World War II and Indo-Pakistani War of 1947–1948
- Captain Yogendra Singh Yadav, of Aurangabad, Bulandshahr; hero of Tiger Hill in Kargil war

=== Maha Vir Chakra ===
- Air Chief Marshall Swaroop Krishna Kaul
- Captain Mahendra Nath Mulla
- Lance Naik Ram Ugrah Pandey
- Brigadier Mohammad Usman Azamgarh

=== Ashok Chakra ===
- Lieutenant Colonel Harsh Uday Singh Gaur
- Constable Kamlesh Kumari
- Lieutenant Colonel Jas Ram Singh
- Naik Neeraj Kumar Singh

=== Bharat Ratna ===
- Bhagwan Das, philosopher and freedom fighter, Varanasi
- Pandit Madan Mohan Malviya, educationist and politician, founder of Banaras Hindu University, Varanasi
- Jawaharlal Nehru, leader of the Indian independence movement; first Prime Minister of India
- Ravi Shankar, sitar maestro, Ghazipur
- Lal Bahadur Shastri, freedom fighter, former Prime Minister; belonged to Varanasi and Allahabad
- Rajrishi Purushottam Das Tandon, freedom fighter, Allahabad
- Atal Bihari Vajpayee, politician, eleventh Prime Minister of India

=== Padma Vibhushan ===
- Amitabh Bachchan
- Ustad Ghulam Mustafa Khan
- Kishan Maharaj
- Uday Shankar
- Kalyan Singh
- Mulayam Singh Yadav

=== Padma Bhushan ===
- Amitabh Bachchan, film actor
- Dhyan Chand, international hockey player
- Irfan Habib, historian
- Qurratulain Hyder, author
- Ustad Ghulam Mustafa Khan
- Kishan Maharaj, tabla maestro
- Josh Malihabadi, poet
- Mahesh Prasad Mehray, ophthalmologist
- Naushad, music director
- Rahul Sankrityayan
- Srilal Shukla, Hindi writer
- Obaid Siddiqui, science
- Ram Kinkar Upadhyay, scholar
- Bhagwati Charan Varma, Hindi author

=== Padma Shree ===
- Muzaffar Ali, film director
- Hamid Ansari, Vice President of India
- Malini Awasthi
- Yogiraj Bharat Bhushan, only Padmashri awardee yogi; founder director of Mokshayatan International Yogashram at Saharanpur
- Praveen Chandra, cardiac surgeon
- Kanhai Chitrakar
- Kapil Deva Dvivedi
- Mansoor Hasan, Medicine (2011)
- Ravindra Jain, singer, music composer, lyricst
- Giriraj Kishore writer
- Maqbool Ahmed Lari, Litt. & Edu.
- Vidya Niwas Mishra, writer
- Gopaldas Neeraj, Hindi poet and lyricist
- Hakim Syed Zillur Rahman, scholar of Unani medicine
- Anil K. Rajvanshi, Grassroot research
- K. P. Saxena, writer
- Mohammed Shahid, ex-captain of Indian hockey team, Varanasi
- Kunwar Digvijay Singh Babu, hockey Olympian
- Prakash Singh
- Bekal Utsahi poet, writer
- Usha Yadav, Educationist

=== Dada Saheb Phalke Award ===
- Naushad Ali, music composer
- Amitabh Bachchan, film actor, film producer, television host, occasional playback singer
- Majrooh Sultanpuri, lyricist

=== Gyananpith Awards ===
- Amarkant
- Firaq Gorakhpuri, poet
- Qurratulain Hyder, writer
- Ali Sardar Jafri, writer and poet
- Akhlaq Mohammed Khan
- Sri Lal Sukla
- Mahadevi Verma, poet

=== Magasaysay Award ===
- Sandeep Pandey
- Rajendra Singh, water conservationist

=== Arjuna Award ===
- Varun Bhati,
- Abhinn Shyam Gupta, badminton
- Moraad Ali Khan, shooter
- Ashish Kumar, gymnastics
- Satish Kumar, boxer
- Syed Modi, badminton
- Jagbir Singh, hockey
- Narsingh Yadav, wrestler

=== Major Dhyan Chand Award ===
- Rajkumar Baisla, (Wrestling) from Vill. Mewla Bhatti, Ghaziabad

== Defence services ==
=== Army ===
- Abdul Hamid, four Grenadiers, Indian Army, Param Vir Chakra recipient
- Manoj Kumar Pandey, 11 Gorkha Rifles of the Indian Army, Param Vir Chakra recipient
- K.M. Seth
- Lt. General Zameerud-din Shah
- Jadunath Singh, Rajput Regiment, recipient of Param Vir Chakra
- Asaram Tyagi, Mahavir Chakra in Indo-Pak war of 1965
- Brigadier Mohammad Usman, recipient of Maha Vir Chakra
- Yogendra Singh Yadav, 18th Grenadiers of the Indian Army, Param Vir Chakra recipient

=== Air force ===
- Norman Anil Kumar Browne, Air Chief Marshal (Retd)
- S.K. Kaul, Air Chief Marshal (Retd)
- Trevor Keelor IAF, Vir Chakra winner in Indo-Pak war of 1965
- Denzil Keelor IAF, Air Marshall (Retd), Vir Chakra winner; Kirti Chakra recipient
- Rakesh Kumar Singh Bhadauria, Air Chief Marshal, 26th Chief of the Air Staff (India)
- S.P. Tyagi, Air Chief Marshal (Retd)

=== Navy ===
- Captain Mahendra Nath Mulla

== Science and medicine ==
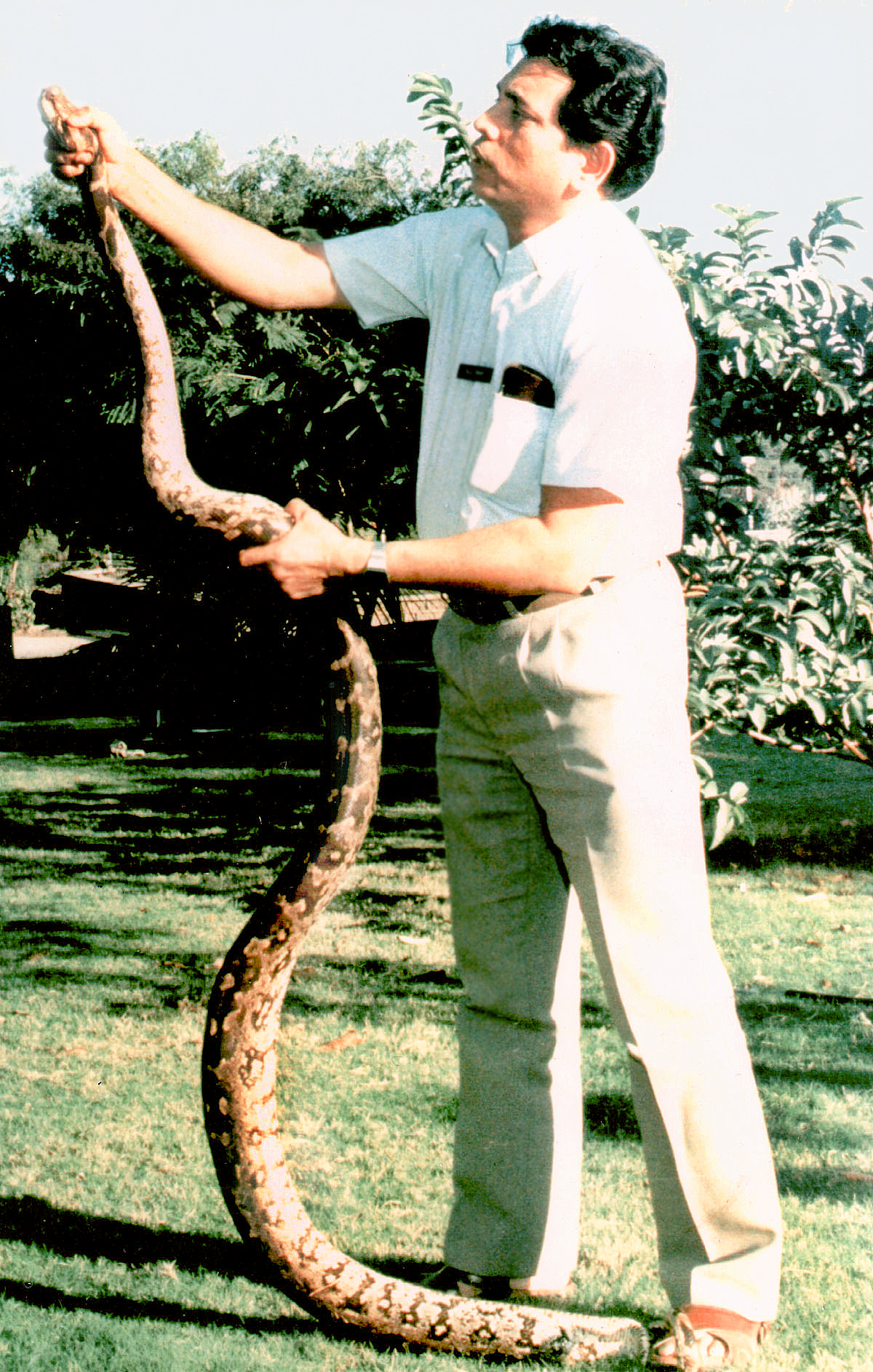
Lalji Singh

- Afroz Ahmad, environmental scientist and administrator
- Amita Aggarwal (born 1960) is an Indian clinical immunologist and rheumatologist.
- Harish-Chandra (Mehrotra), mathematician who did fundamental work in representation theory, especially harmonic analysis on semisimple Lie groups
- Aditi Sen De is an Indian scientist, a professor in quantum information and computation group at the Harish-Chandra Research Institute, Allahabad.
- Saroj Chooramani Gopal, is an Indian medical doctor, medical educationist and considered as the first woman M.ch paediatric surgeon from All India Institute of Medical Sciences, New Delhi in the country.
- Nishith Gupta, molecular biologist
- Gaiti Hasan (born 19 November 1956) is an Indian scientist who researches in the fields of molecular biology, genetics, neuroscience and cell signalling.
- Ruqaiya Hasan (3 July 1931 (Note: After government birth records were lost in Pratapgarh, Hasan's mother re-registered Ruqaiya's birthdate as 3 July 1931, slightly earlier than her real birthdate, to enroll her in school earlier.) – 24 June 2015) was a professor of linguistics who held visiting positions and taught at various universities in England.
- Zoya Hasan was Professor of Political Science and Dean of the School of Social Sciences (SSS) at the Jawaharlal Nehru University, New Delhi.
- Shahid Jameel, Indian virologist
- Ritu Karidhal is an Indian scientist and aerospace engineer working in the Indian Space Research Organisation (ISRO). She was a Deputy Operations Director to India's Mars orbital mission, Mangalyaan.
- Ravindra Khattree, Distinguished Professor and statistician who worked in statistical inference, multivariate analysis, experimental designs, biostatistics and quality control
- Atul Kumar, CSIR-CDRI (inventor of anti-osteoporosis drug)
- Kazi Mobin-Uddin, inventor of Inferior vena cava filter
- Soniya Nityanand (born 6 September 1962) is an Indian immunologist specialising in hematology.
- Sri Niwas, Indian geophysicist.
- Rajendra K. Pachauri, chairman of the Intergovernmental Panel on Climate Change
- Prem Chand Pandey, scientist, physicist, meteorologist, oceanographer
- Zahoor Qasim, oceanographer, leader of first Indian expedition to Antarctica
- Qamar Rahman is an Indian scientist who has worked extensively in the last 40 years to understand the physiological effects of nanoparticles.
- Syed Ziaur Rahman, medical pharmacologist
- Anil K. Rajvanshi, sustainability and rural development expert
- P. K . Sethi, inventor of the Jaipur foot
- Rani Dhavan Shankardass is an Indian social historian and global expert on prison reform.
- Salimuzzaman Siddiqui, organic chemist specialising in natural product chemistry
- Hassan Nasiem Siddiquie, Indian marine geologist and former director of the National Institute of Oceanography.
- Digvijai Singh
- Lalji Singh, molecular biologist
- Mriganka Sur, Indian-born neuroscientist working in the United States
- Sushruta, is the listed author of the Sushruta Samhita (Sushruta's Compendium), a treatise considered to be one of the most important surviving ancient treatises on medicine and is considered a foundational text of Ayurveda.
- Rajeev Kumar Varshney, agricultural scientist, genomics specialist, biotechnologist
- Gopal Krishna Vishwakarma, more popularly known as G K Vishwakarma, was an eminent orthopedic surgeon, academician and public health administrator.
- Jhillu Singh Yadav, Chemist
- Raj Vir Singh Yadav

== Technology ==
- Sairee Chahal is a technology entrepreneur and the founder and CEO of SHEROES, a platform that supports women entrepreneurs.
- Divya Jain is an Indian software engineer and entrepreneur. Jain has been called a "data doyenne" by Fortune.
- Deepali Pant Joshi is a former executive director of the Reserve Bank of India (retired in 2017).
- Vijay Shekhar Sharma, Founder & CEO of Paytm
- Rashmi Sinha is an Indian businesswoman and CEO of San Francisco-based technology company SlideShare.

== Holders of high offices ==
=== President ===
- Mohammad Hidayatullah, Acting President of India
- Ram Nath Kovind, 14th President of India

=== Vice President ===
- Hamid Ansari, former Vice-President of India
- Mohammad Hidayatullah, former Vice-President of India
- Gopal Swarup Pathak, former Vice-President of India

=== Prime Ministers ===
- Indira Gandhi, fourth Prime Minister of India and Bharat Ratna awardee
- Rajiv Gandhi, sixth prime minister of India and Bharat Ratna awardee
- Jawaharlal Nehru, first Prime Minister of India and Bharat Ratna awardee
- Lal Bahadur Shastri, second Prime Minister of India and Bharat Ratna awardee
- Chandra Shekhar, ninth Prime Minister of India
- Choudhary Charan Singh, fifth Prime Minister of India and Bharat Ratna awardee
- Vishwanath Pratap Singh, eighth Prime Minister of India
- Atal Bihari Vajpayee. eleventh Prime Minister of India and Bharat Ratna awardee

=== Prime Ministers of other countries ===
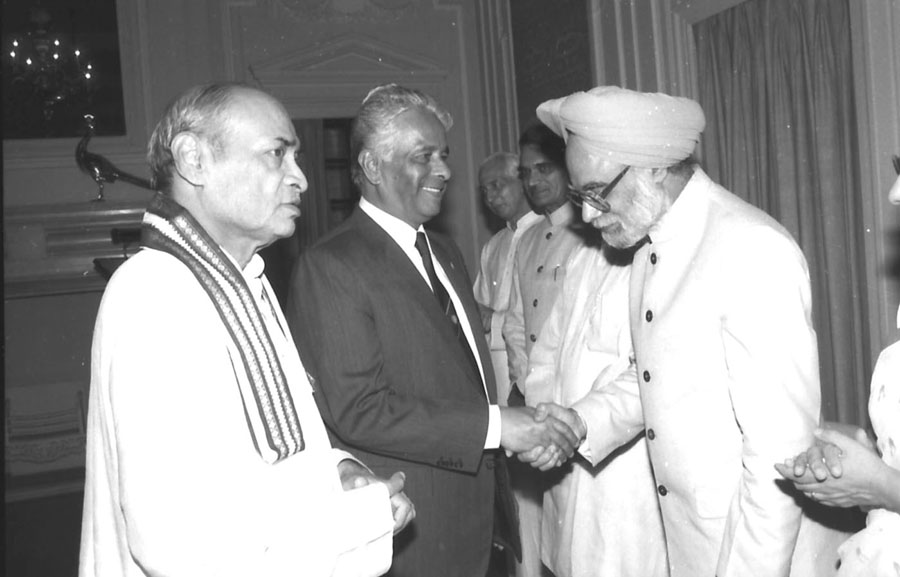
Jugnauth (center) with Indian Prime Minister P. V. Narasimha Rao (left) and Finance Minister Manmohan Singh (right) in New Delhi, 1991

- Anerood Jugnauth, former Prime Minister of Mauritius, His grand father migrated from Ballia district
- Pravind Jugnauth, Prime Minister of Mauritius, Son of Anerood Jugnauth

=== President of other countries ===
- Anerood Jugnauth, former President of Mauritius, his grand father migrated from Ballia district,

=== Governors ===
- Triloki Nath Chaturvedi, former CAG and former Governor of Karnataka
- Mohammad Fazal, former Governor of Maharashtra
- Khurshid Alam Khan, former Governor of Karnataka
- A R Kidwai, former Governor of Haryana
- Satya Pal Malik, former Governor of Meghalaya, Odisha, Bihar, Jammu and Kashmir, Goa
- Kalraj Mishra, Governor of Rajasthan and former Governor Himanchal Pradesh
- Syed Sibtey Razi, Governor of Jharkhand
- Mohammad Yunus Saleem, former Governor of Bihar
- Girish Chandra Saxena, former Governor of Jammu & Kashmir
- K.M. Seth, former Governor of Chhattisgarh
- Kalyan Singh, Governor of Rajasthan
- Virendra Verma, former Governor of Punjab and Himachal Pradesh
- Ram Naresh Yadav, former Governor of Madhya Pradesh and Chhattisgarh

=== Chief Justices ===
- Mirza Hameedullah Beg, former Chief Justice of India
- Mohammad Hidayatullah, former Chief Justice of India
- V. N. Khare, former Chief Justice of India
- Kamal Narain Singh, former Chief Justice of India
- Raghunandan Swarup Pathak, former Chief Justice of India
- Kailas Nath Wanchoo, former Chief Justice of India

=== Chief Ministers ===
- Yogi Adityanath
- Hemvati Nandan Bahuguna
- Muhammad Ahmad Said Khan Chhatari
- Banarsi Das
- Babulal Gaur, former Chief Minister of Madhya Pradesh
- Chandra Bhanu Gupta
- Ram Prakash Gupta
- Sucheta Kripalani
- Mayawati
- Sripati Mishra
- Govind Ballabh Pant
- Sampurnanand
- Choudhary Charan Singh
- Kalyan Singh
- Rajnath Singh
- Tribhuvan Narain Singh
- Vir Bahadur Singh
- Vishwanath Pratap Singh
- Narayan Dutt Tiwari
- Kamalapati Tripathi
- Mulayam Singh Yadav
- Akhilesh Yadav
- Ram Naresh Yadav

== Political figures ==
=== Pre independence ===
Madan Mohan Malaviya

- Mukhtar Ahmed Ansari, former President of Indian National Congress
- Rajeshwar Bali, education minister (1924–1928)
- Madan Mohan Malaviya
- Jawaharlal Nehru
- Motilal Nehru, Indian National Congress leader
- Govind Ballabh Pant
- Sampurnanand
- Sahajanand Saraswati
- Munishwar Dutt Upadhyay

=== Post independence ===
- Laxmi Raman Acharya
- Yogi Adityanath, Chief Minister of Uttar Pradesh
- Raj Babbar, member of Parliament
- Hemwati Nandan Bahuguna
- Rajendra Kumari Bajpai (1925–1999), former cabinet minister
- Dinanath Bhaskar, political leader; former minister
- Ram Govind Chaudhary
- Devendra Nath Dwivedi, Indian politician and Governor designate of Gujarat
- Feroze Gandhi
- Indira Gandhi
- Shyama Charan Gupta, politician, entrepreneur
- Muzaffar Hasan, former Transport Minister, Indian National Congress party
- Sriprakash Jaiswal, union minister
- Kailash Nath Katju, former Union Home Minister and lawyer
- Amrit Kaur, Gandhian, first lady Minister of India
- Arif Mohammad Khan, political leader
- Mohsina Kidwai
- Rafi Ahmed Kidwai
- Manohar Lal (b. 1938), UP MLA, cabinet minister
- Sunder Lal
- Marghoob Ahmad Lari, former State Minister of Tourism
- Ram Manohar Lohia
- Keshav Prasad Maurya, Deputy Chief Minister of Uttar Pradesh
- Mayawati, former Chief Minister of Uttar Pradesh
- Raj Narain
- Kamal Nath, politician
- Raj Mangal Pande
- Govind Ballabh Pant
- Suresh Pasi, ministries of housing, vocational education, skill development
- Bacha Pathak, 7 time MLA from Bansdih constituency, 2 time cabinet minister in Uttar Pradesh government
- Thakur Ji Pathak, activist, Indian political leader
- Kalpnath Rai
- Sampurnanand, Ex-Chief Minister of Uttar Pradesh
- Lal Bahadur Shastri, Ex-Prime Minister of India
- Prakash Vir Shastri, member of Parliament and advocate of the Arya Samaj movement
- Chandra Shekhar, former prime minister of India
- Ishwar Chandra Shukla
- Shiv Pratap Shukla, Member of Parliament (Rajya Sabha), Minister of state (finance), former Cabinet Minister (Government of Uttar Pradesh)
- Ajit Singh, political leader
- Charan Singh
- Kalyan Singh, UP CM and Rajasthan Governor; BJP Vice President
- Mahendra Singh Tikait, Kisan leader
- Om Prakash Singh, Former chief Minister of Uttar Pradesh and Uttrakhand
- Sanjay Singh
- V. P. Singh, 7th prime minister of India
- Kamlesh Tiwari, founder of Hindu Samaj Party, who insulted Muhammad, was imprisoned, and murdered after his release
- N. D. Tiwari
- Kamalapati Tripathi
- K. C. Tyagi
- Deendayal Upadhyaya
- Beni Prasad Verma, former minister and leader
- Ram Chandra Vikal, Deputy Chief Minister
- Akhilesh Yadav, Former Chief Minister of Uttar Pradesh, President of Samajwadi Party
- Mulayam Singh Yadav, former Defence Minister of India, former Chief Minister of Uttar Pradesh, founder of Samajwadi Party
- Ram Naresh Yadav
- Satyapal Singh Yadav, former union minister
- Shyam Lal Yadav, former union minister and Deputy Chairman of Rajya Sabha

== Civil service / diplomacy ==
=== Indian Foreign Service ===
- Asaf Ali, first Indian Ambassador to the United States
- Girija Shankar Bajpai, first Secretary-General of Foreign Affairs
- Braj Kumar Nehru, Indian diplomat and Ambassador of India to the United States
- Vijaya Lakshmi Pandit, Indian diplomat and politician; sister of Jawaharlal Nehru
- Shilendra Kumar Singh, former Foreign Secretary of India; former Governor of Rajasthan and Arunachal Pradesh

=== Civil services ===
- Afroz Ahmad, member of NCA, Government of India
- Vijai Shankar Dubey is an Indian Administrative Service officer of 1966 cadre batch. He is the only IAS officer to have served as Chief Secretary of two states Bihar & Jharkhand.
- Wajahat Habibullah, Chief Information Commissioner of India
- Isha Basant Joshi, first woman to be appointed an IAS officer
- Durga Shanker Mishra
- Yogendra Narain, retired IAS officer. Former Secretary General of the Rajya Sabha, Defence Secretary of India, Chief Secretary of Uttar Pradesh and Surface Transport Secretary of India.
- Manzoor Alam Quraishi, former ICS of 1941 batch, Uttar Pradesh Cadre), born in Ballia
- Baleshwar Rai
- Vinod Rai, CAG
- Chandrika Prasad Srivastava, bureaucrat
- Dharma Vira, ICS, cabinet secretary and governor of West Bengal, Mysore
- Neera Yadav
- Vinod Kumar Yadav, first CEO of Railway Board

=== Indian Police Service ===
- Girish Bihari
- Shrish Chandra Dikshit
- Mukul Goel
- Brij Lal
- Navniet Sekera
- Laxmi Singh
- Prakash Singh
- Sulkhan Singh
- Jagmohan Yadav
- Manoj Yadava

== Business ==
- Sanjeev Bikhchandani, founder and executive vice chairman of Info Edge which owns Naukri.com, a job portal, and the co-founder of Ashoka University.
- Ponty Chadha
- Sunil Duggal
- Jaiprakash Gaur, (born c.1930) is an Indian entrepreneur. He founded and, until his retirement in 2010, was the chairman of Jaypee Group.
- Himanshu Gupta, an Indian American energy policy expert, engineer and entrepreneur in climate change. He is the co-founder and chief executive officer of ClimateAI.
- Piyush Gupta, currently serving as the chief executive officer, and director of DBS Group, the largest bank in Southeast Asia by total assets.
- Puran Chandra Gupta, was an Indian journalist who founded the Dainik Jagran media group and it Hindi-language publication Dainik Jagran.
- Shyama Charan Gupta, founder of Shyam Group
- Vinod Gupta, former CEO and chairman of InfoUSA; founder of Vinod Gupta School of Management
- Khwaja Abdul Hamied
- Shahnaz Husain, (born 1944) the founder, chairperson and managing director of The Shahnaz Husain Group.
- Ashok Kumar Jain
- Indu Jain, was the chairperson of India's largest media group, popularly known as The Times Group.
- Sahu Ramesh Chandra Jain
- Sahu Shanti Prasad Jain
- Sumit Jain, entrepreneur, co-founder and CEO Opentalk.to, Co-Founder and ex-CEO Commonfloor.com
- Deepali Pant Joshi
- Haji Kallan
- Suneet Maheshwari
- Samir Modi
- Kapil Mohan
- Narendra Mohan, was an Indian industrialist, chairman and managing director of the Jagran Prakashan, the publisher of the Hindi newspaper Dainik Jagran
- Bimla Poddar, is an Indian social worker, businessperson, philanthropist and the founder of Jnana Pravaha
- Subrata Roy, founder of Sahara India
- Meenakshi Sargogi
- Vijay Shekhar Sharma, founder and CEO of Paytm Chairperson of Paras Milk Pvt. Ltd.
- Ajay S. Shriram
- Gajendra Singh, CMD Saaibaba Telefilms; founder of Ganga Gauri Mahavidyalaya, Ramnagar, Baijabari, Azamgarh
- Kushal Pal Singh, president of DLF Universal Group
- Surendra Singh Nagar
- Lala Kamlapat Singhania, (1884 – 1937) founder of the J. K. Organisation, one of India's largest conglomerates.
- Saurabh Srivastava, entrepreneur, investment professional, institution builder and a former chairman of NASSCOM, a trade organization for the promotion of Indian IT industry.
- Ishwar Das Varshnei, died 1948) was the father of the glass industry in India.

== Educators / founders of educational institutions ==
- Naheed Abidi
- Runa Banerjee
- Gulbadan Begum
- Kamala Bose
- Chandabai
- Saeeda Faiz
- Jagdish Gandhi, founder of the City Montessori School
- Abidullah Ghazi
- V. Mohini Giri
- Saroj Chooramani Gopal
- Mona Chandravati Gupta
- Hamida Habibullah
- Ruqaiya Hasan
- Zoya Hasan
- Radhika Herzberger
- Sehba Hussain
- Pupul Jayakar
- Deepali Pant Joshi
- Syed Ahmad Khan, founder of Aligarh Muslim University
- Rehana Khatoon
- Aruna Kori
- Birju Maharaj
- Madan Mohan Malaviya, founder of Banaras Hindu University
- Chittaranjan Mitra
- Rajat Moona
- Bishambhar Nath Pande
- Bimla Poddar
- Azarmi Dukht Safavi
- Rani Dhavan Shankardass
- Lilavati Singh
- Uday Pratap Singh
- Parveen Talha
- Romila Thapar
- Rashmi Tiwari
- Ragini Trivedi
- Mahadevi Varma
- Zahida Zaidi
- Roohi Zuberi

== Authors ==
=== Hindi ===
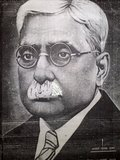
Ramchandra Shukla

- Agyeya
- Parichay Das, essayist, poet, critic
- Hazari Prasad Dwivedi, Hindi novelist
- Babu Gulabrai, Hindi writer
- Bharatendu Harishchandra, Hindi writer
- Sri Krishna Rai Hridyesh
- Malik Muhammad Jayasi, author of Padmavat
- Vidya Niwas Mishra, Hindi scholar
- Amritlal Nagar, Hindi writer
- Ravindra Prabhat, Hindi novelist
- Jaishankar Prasad, Hindi writer
- Munshi Premchand, novelist
- Kuber Nath Rai
- Vibhuti Narain Rai, Hindi writer
- Viveki Rai
- Rahi Masoom Raza, author of Topi Shukla and Adha Gaon
- Rahul Sankrityayan, polyglot
- Sahajanand Saraswati, author of books on sociology, freedom struggle, peasant movement, and autobiography
- Sapan Saxena (b. 5 April 1985), novelist known for Finders, Keepers, UNNS-The Captivation and The Tenth Riddle
- Vishnu Sharma, author of Panchtantra
- Chatursen Shastri (1891–1960), Hindi writer
- Ramchandra Shukla, Hindi writer and historian
- Shrilal Shukla, writer of Raag Darbari
- Vinod Kumar Shukla, writer
- Kashinath Singh, Hindi writer
- Amitabh Thakur Hindi writer
- Ayodhya Prasad Upadhyay, Hindi writer
- Baldev Upadhyaya, Hindi scholar and writer
- Bhagwati Charan Verma, Hindi writer
- Ramlochan Vishwakarma, Lok Writer
- Rajendra Yadav, Hindi novelist
- Yashpal, Hindi writer

=== Urdu ===
- Ismat Chughtai, writer
- Firaq Gorakhpuri
- Qurratulain Hyder, writer of Aag Ka Darya
- Ibn-e-Safi, novelist of Jasoosi Duniya
- Syed Zillur Rahman, author of books on Unani medicine
- Mirza Hadi Ruswa, author of Umrao Jaan

=== English ===
- Leema Dhar, novelist, poet and columnist
- Attia Hosain, English author and journalist
- Ruchita Misra, author
- Ajay K. Pandey, English author
- Nayantara Sahgal, novelist and writer
- Allan Sealy, novelist and writer
- Anil Swarup, English author
- Vikas Swarup, author of Q&A
- Ira Trivedi is an Indian author, columnist, and yoga teacher. She writes both fiction and nonfiction, often on issues related to women and gender in India.

== Poets ==
=== Hindi ===
- Harikrishna Prasad Gupta Agrahari, poet
- Harivansh Rai Bachchan, writer and poet
- Virendra Kumar Baranwal, writer of Jinnah: ek punardrishti
- Guru Bhakt Singh 'Bhakt'
- Subhadra Kumari Chauhan
- Maithilisharan Gupt, modern Hindi poet
- Kaka Hathrasi, humorous poet
- Dushyant Kumar, Hindi poet
- Gopaldas Neeraj, Hindi poet
- Sumitranandan Pant, one of the four major pillars of the Chhayavaadi school of Hindi
- Jaishankar Prasad, one of the four major pillars of the Chhayavaadi school of Hindi
- Kuber Nath Rai, Lit Nibandh
- Kedarnath Singh
- Shivmangal Singh Suman
- Suryakant Tripathi
- Ayodhya Prasad Upadhyay
- Mahadevi Varma, a poet of the Chhayavaadi generation, a period of romanticism in modern Hindi poetry
- Kumar Vishwas, Hindi Poet
- Ramashankar Yadav, Hindi Poet

=== Urdu ===
- Akbar Allahabadi, poet
- Mir Anees, Urdu Marsiya poet
- Kaifi Azmi, Urdu and Hindi lyricist, poet and songwriter
- Khumar Barabankvi, Urdu poet
- Brij Narayan Chakbast, Urdu poet
- Ghalib, classical Urdu and Persian poet
- Firaq Gorakhpuri, Urdu poet, winner of Jnanpith award
- Altaf Hussain Hali, Urdu poet, biographer of Ghalib's life, and a commentator of his poetry
- Ali Sardar Jafri, Urdu poet
- Safi Lakhnavi, Urdu poet
- Majaz Lakhnawi, Urdu poet
- Josh Malihabadi, Urdu poet
- Mir Taqi Mir
- Hasrat Mohani, Urdu poet
- Jigar Moradabadi, Urdu poet
- Masoom Moradabadi, journalist
- Daya Shankar Kaul Nasim, Urdu poet
- Majrooh Sultanpuri, poet and lyricist
- A. M. Turaz, Poet & Film writer
- Bekal Utsahi, Urdu poet
- Zaigham, Urdu poet who migrated to Bengal

=== Bhojpuri ===
- Parichay Das
- Viveki Rai

== Environmentalists ==
- Afroz Ahmad, is an Indian environment scientist and a former civil servant.
- Sunderlal Bahuguna (9 January 1927 – 21 May 2021) was an Indian environmentalist and Chipko movement leader.
- Ranjit Bhargava, is an Indian environmentalist, known for his endeavors towards environmental conservation and his efforts for obtaining UNESCO World Heritage Site status for the upper Ganga region.
- Anupam Mishra (1948 – 19 December 2016) was an Indian Gandhian, author, journalist, environmentalist, TED speaker, and water conservationist who worked on promoting water conservation, water management and traditional rainwater harvesting techniques.
- Vandana Shiva (born 5 November 1952) is an Indian scholar, environmental activist, food sovereignty advocate, ecofeminist and anti-globalization author.
- Billy Arjan Singh, as an Indian hunter turned conservationist and author. He was the first who tried to reintroduce tigers and leopards from captivity into the wild.

== Scholars ==
- Narendra Deva
- Sudhakara Dvivedi was born in 1855 in Khajuri, a village near Varanasi. In childhood he studied mathematics under Pandit Devakrsna.
- Divya Dwivedi, philosopher
- Mushirul Hasan, historian
- Masud Husain Khan, eminent linguist; first Professor Emeritus in Social Sciences at Aligarh Muslim University; fifth Vice-Chancellor of Jamia Millia Islamia, a central university in New Delhi
- Renu Khator, Chancellor of the University of Houston System; President of the University of Houston; first Indian American to lead a major research university in the United States
- Saket Kushwaha, educationist and agricultural economist of Banaras Hindu University, currently Vice Chancellor of Rajiv Gandhi University, former Vice Chancellor of Lalit Narayan Mithila University
- Adya Prasad Pandey, notable economist of Banaras Hindu University and Currently Vice Chancellor of Manipur University
- Arun Tiwari, missile scientist, author, professor
- Raja Ram Yadav, educationist, Physicist, former Vice Chancellor of Veer Bahadur Singh Purvanchal University

== Fine arts ==
- Basawan
- Ranbir Singh Bisht
- Sukumar Bose
- Eric Bowen
- Mallika Chabba
- Vijay Gaur
- Aman Singh Gulati, world's first almond artist
- Arvind Gupta, Indian toy inventor, author, translator and scientist.
- Prayag Jha
- Govind Kanhai
- Krishn Kanhai
- Anil Karanjai
- Imtiyaz Ali Khan
- Yashodhar Mathpal
- Gogi Saroj Pal
- Mola Ram
- Ram Chandra Shukla, painter
- Frank Wesley

== Journalism ==
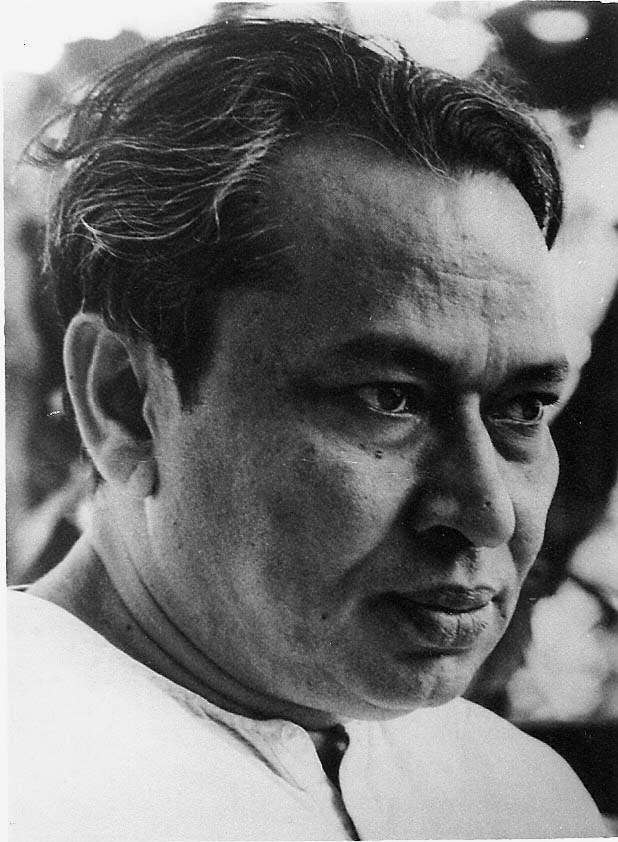
Raghuvir Sahay

- Inderjit Badhwar (born 1943) is an Indian journalist, novelist and the former editor of India Today.
- Aniruddha Bahal, investigative journalist
- Dharamvir Bharati, former editor of Dharamyug magazine
- Parichay Das, writer, essayist, poet and editor of contemporary Bhojpuri poetry
- Feroze Gandhi, managing editor of National Herald
- Sahu Ramesh Chandra Jain, Times of India and Navbharat Times
- Vinod Mehta, editor
- Pankaj Mishra, journalist
- Narendra Mohan, Dainik Jagran
- Saeed Naqvi, journalist and TV producer
- Arun Nehru, former minister and columnist
- Ram Bahadur Rai, magazine editor
- M. Chalapathi Rau, Indian journalist and an authority on Nehruvian thought
- Raghuvir Sahay, editor of Dinmaan
- Surendra Pratap Singh, editor of Ravivar

== Sports ==
=== Badminton ===
- Abhinn Shyam Gupta, former national badminton champion
- Syed Modi, former national badminton champion

=== Baseball ===
- Dinesh Patel, one of the first two Indians to sign a professional baseball contract in the United States
- Rinku Singh, one of the first two Indians to sign a professional baseball contract in the United States

=== Basketball ===
- Akanksha Singh (born 7 September 1989 in Varanasi) is an Indian basketball player and former captain of the India Women's National Basketball Team.
- Divya Singh (born 21 July 1982) former captain of the India women's national basketball team.
- Prashanti Singh (born 5 May 1984, in Varanasi), is a shooting guard for the India women's national basketball team.
- Pratima Singh is a member of the India women's national basketball team, hailing from Jaunpur, Uttar Pradesh.

=== Cricket ===
- Surinder Amarnath
- Parvinder Awana
- Chetan Chauhan, former Test cricketer
- Piyush Chawla
- Priyam Garg
- Rohan Gavaskar
- Rajinder Hans
- Narendra Hirwani
- Yashasvi Jaiswal, cricketer
- Dhruv Jurel, cricketer
- Mohsin Khan (Indian cricketer), is an Indian cricketer.
- Mohammad Kaif, international cricketer
- Hemlata Kala, member of Indian women's cricket team
- Obaid Kamal, cricketer
- Bhuvneshwar Kumar, international cricketer
- Praveen Kumar
- Raman Lamba
- Arun Lal, former Test cricketer
- Shivam Mavi, cricketer
- Shubham Mavi
- Gyanendra Pandey, cricketer
- Manoj Prabhakar, cricketer
- Mohammed Shami, international cricketer
- Deepti Sharma, International cricketer
- Meghna Singh, International Cricketer
- R. P. Singh, Rae Bareli (U.P.), international cricketer
- Rinku Singh (cricketer)
- Swapnil Singh, Rae Bareli (U.P.)
- Suresh Raina, international cricketer
- Sameer Rizvi, Uttar Pradesh cricketer.
- Kartik Tyagi, fast-bowler cricketer
- Sudeep Tyagi
- Kuldeep Yadav, cricketer, Kanpur (U.P.)
- Poonam Yadav, International Cricketer
- Suryakumar Yadav, international cricketer
- Umesh Yadav, Deoria (U.P.), Indian cricketer
- Vijay Yadav, international cricketer
- Ashish Zaidi, cricketer

=== Hockey ===
- Dhyan Chand, former international field hockey player, awarded the Padma Bhushan
- Zafar Iqbal, former captain and chief coach of the Indian hockey team
- Mohammed Shahid, member of the Indian team that won a gold medal at the 1980 Olympic Games in Moscow; awarded Arjuna Award in 1980 and Padma Shri in 1986
- Jagbir Singh, captain of National Hockey team in 1988 and 1992 Olympics; awarded Arjuna Award in 1990
- K. D. Singh, former national hockey player and Olympian

=== Wrestling ===
- Anuj Chaudhary
- Divya Kakran
- Narsingh Yadav
- Sandeep Tulsi Yadav

=== Other sports ===
- Arjun Bhati, golfer
- Varun Singh Bhati, para athlete
- Saurabh Chaudhary, shooter
- Pawan Gupta, sanda fighter
- Moraad Ali Khan, shooter
- Praveen Kumar
- Satish Kumar, Boxing
- Ghaus Mohammad, tennis player, the first Indian Wimbledon Championships quarterfinalist
- Jitu Rai, shooter
- Jaspal Rana, shooter
- Ankit Sharma, long jumper born in Pinahat.
- Annu Raj Singh, shooter
- Nitin Tomar, Kabaddi
- Abhishek Yadav, footballer
- Punam Yadav, weightlifting
- Ram Singh Yadav, Marathon runner, represented India at the 2012 Summer Olympics

== Music dance ==
=== Musicians ===
- Begum Akhtar, ghazal singer
- Vishnu Narayan Bhatkhande, musicologist
- Ashutosh Bhattacharya (1917–2004), tabla player
- Hariprasad Chaurasia, bansuri player
- Bismillah Khan, shehnai player, awarded the Bharat Ratna (2001)
- Kishan Maharaj, tabla player
- Vikash Maharaj, sarod player, awarded the Karmveer, Shiromani, Manishi Ratn, and the Yash Bharti.
- Gopal Shankar Misra, vichitra veena player
- Lalmani Misra, Indian classical musician
- Naushad, music director; awarded the Dadasaheb Phalke Award for his contributions to Indian cinema
- Nucleya, known by his name Udyan Sagar, is an Indian electronic music producer.
- Cliff Richard, English singer
- Ravi Shankar, sitar player, awarded the Bharat Ratna in 1999; recipient of three Grammy Awards

=== Singers ===
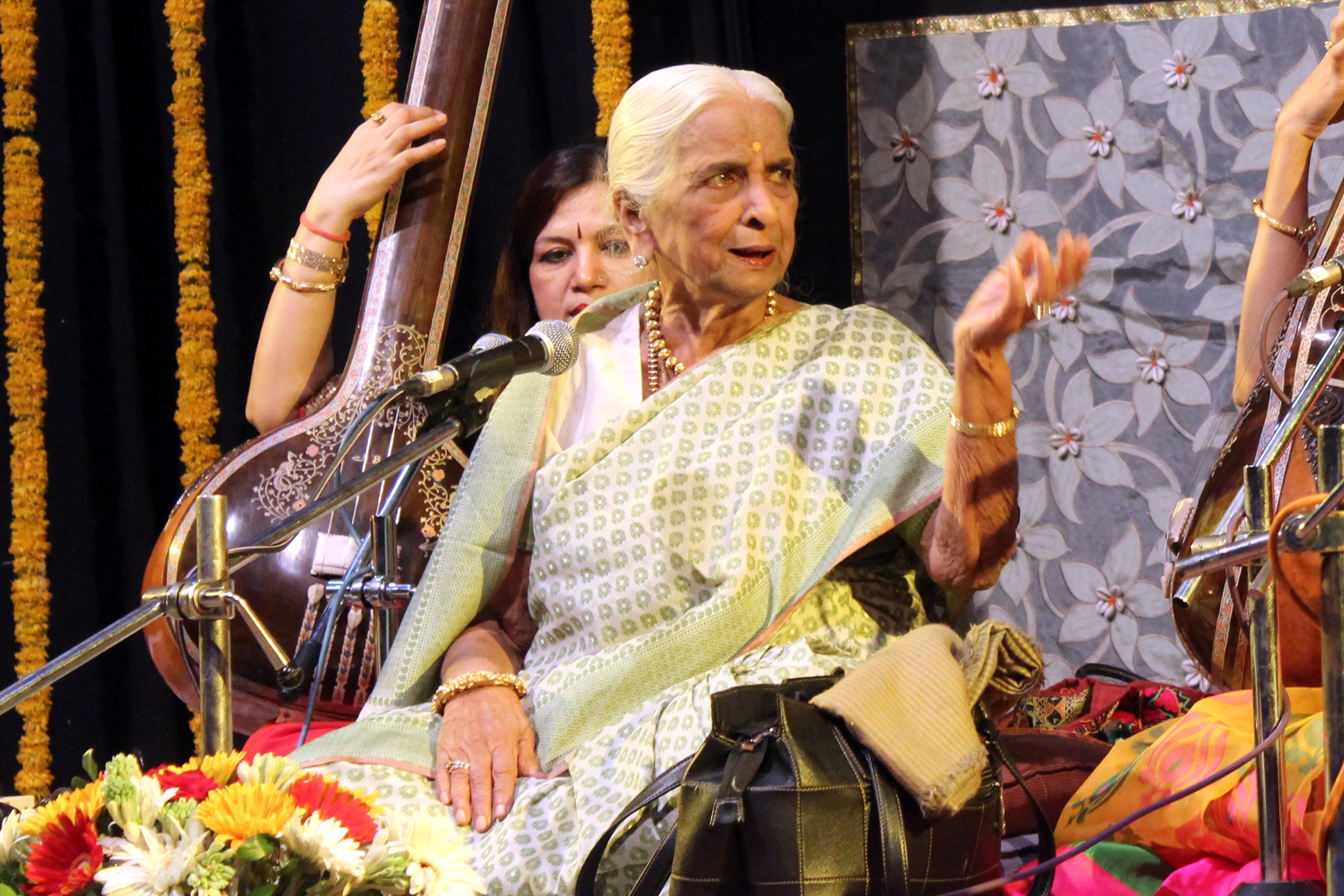
Girija Devi

- Abhijeet Bhattacharya, from Kanpur
- Girija Devi, Indian Banaras Gharana singer
- Siddheshwari Devi, Hindustani singer from Banares, known as Maa (mother)
- Ravindra Jain
- Anup Jalota, Ghazal and Bhajan singer
- Purshottam Das Jalota (1925–2011), bhajan singer, Padma Shri (2004)
- Kanika Kapoor, from Lucknow
- Sharafat Hussain Khan, from Atrauli
- Kailash Kher, from Meerut
- Talat Mahmood, ghazal singer
- Shubha Mudgal, singer
- Harshit Saxena, singer
- Ankit Tiwari, from Kanpur

=== Folk singers ===
- Malini Awasthi
- Baleshwar Yadav
- Bihari Lal Yadav
- Hiralal Yadav

=== Rappers ===
- Hard Kaur, from Kanpur
- Baba Sehgal

=== Dancers ===
- Sitara Devi
- Birju Maharaj, Kathak exponent
- Lachhu Maharaj, Kathak exponent
- Uday Shankar
- Kapila Vatsyayan, scholar of Indian classical dance

== Cinema and theatre ==
=== Actors and actresses ===
- Zoya Afroz
- Tom Alter
- Raj Babbar
- Amitabh Bachchan
- Pooja Batra
- Deepti Bhatnagar
- Nivedita Bhattacharya
- Sonal Chauhan
- Meenakshi Dixit
- Lara Dutta
- Ali Fazal
- Kumar Gaurav
- Arun Govil
- Archanna Guptaa
- Zakir Hussain
- Jaaved Jaaferi
- Jaddanbai
- Achint Kaur
- Kader Khan
- Kamaal R. Khan
- Ravi Kishan
- Mandakini
- Raza Murad
- Vivek Mushran
- Neena
- Siddharth Nigam
- Nimmi
- Akshay Oberoi
- Surendra Pal
- Chunky Panday
- Disha Patani
- Vishwajeet Pradhan
- Ashutosh Rana
- Urvashi Rautela
- Zohra Sehgal
- Medha Shankr
- Aditi Sharma
- Anushka Sharma
- Jimmy Sheirgill
- Saurabh Shukla
- Amit Sial
- Nawazuddin Siddiqui
- Archana Puran Singh
- Chandrachur Singh
- K. N. Singh
- Mika Singh
- Nandini Singh
- Naseeruddin Shah
- Sushant Singh
- Vedita Pratap Singh
- Vineet Kumar Singh
- Aditya Srivastava
- Dalip Tahil
- Shweta Tiwari
- Lavanya Tripathi
- Tun Tun
- Dinesh Lal Yadav
- Rajpal Yadav
- Tanveer Zaidi
- Marc Zuber

=== Directors/producers ===
- Vijay Krishna Acharya
- Pankaj Advani
- Sultan Ahmed
- Farhan Akhtar
- Zoya Akhtar
- Mushir Alam
- Muzaffar Ali
- Shaad Ali
- Kamal Amrohi
- Alberrt Antoni
- K. Asif
- Nupur Asthana
- Amitabh Aurora
- Sunil Batta
- Muazzam Beg
- Vishal Bhardwaj
- Abhishek Chaubey
- Ashwni Dhir
- Tigmanshu Dhulia
- Mahmood Farooqui
- Ravindra Gautam
- Devendra Goel
- Nishtha Jain
- Abhinav Kashyap
- Anurag Kashyap
- D.D. Kashyap
- Shaheed Latif
- Prakash Mehra
- Sudhir Mishra
- Vishal Mishra
- Premendra Mitra
- Subodh Mukherjee
- Gyan Mukherjee
- S. K. Ojha
- Rajkumar R. Pandey
- Shaukat Hussain Rizvi
- Anil Sharma
- Devi Sharma
- Manoj Sharma
- Dushyant Pratap Singh
- Gajendra Singh
- Siddharth Sinha
- Ajay Srivastava
- Ravi Tandon
- Tushar Tyagi

=== Singers ===
- Begum Akhtar
- Malini Awasthi
- Abhijeet Bhattacharya
- Sunidhi Chauhan
- Rajkumari Dubey
- Ravindra Jain
- Anup Jalota
- Kanika Kapoor
- Hemant Kumar
- Talat Mahmood
- Kabban Mirza
- Baba Sehgal
- Kavita Seth
- Ankit Tiwari

=== Lyricists ===
- Javed Akhtar
- Santosh Anand
- Anjaan
- Sameer Anjaan
- Kaifi Azmi
- Shakeel Badayuni
- Khumar Barabankvi
- Amitabh Bhattacharya
- Indeevar
- Ali Sardar Jafri
- Ravindra Jain
- Manoj Muntashir
- Majrooh Sultanpuri
- A. M. Turaz

=== Composers ===
- Vishal Bhardwaj
- Anand–Milind
- Vishal Mishra
- Shantanu Moitra
- Naushad
- Nucleya
- Rimi Basu Sinha
- Ravi Tripathi
- S. N. Tripathi

=== Theatre related ===
- Nadira Babbar
- Arvind Gaur

=== Cinematographers ===
- Ayananka Bose
- Hemant Chaturvedi
- Ashok Kumar
- Ravikant Nagaich
- Anjuli Shukla

=== Story / script / dialogue writers ===
- Faaiz Anwar
- Kamna Chandra
- Tanuja Chandra
- Juhi Chaturvedi
- Kamleshwar
- Agha Jani Kashmiri
- Shivgopal Krishna
- Sharat Kumar
- Wajahat Mirza
- Dhiraj Mishra
- S. Ali Raza
- K. P. Saxena
- Himanshu Sharma
- Mukhram Sharma
- Jalees Sherwani
- Javed Siddiqi
- Anuraadha Tewari
- Shama Zaidi

== Navratnas ==
- Birbal, jester and poet of Akbar's court
- Abdul Rahim Khan-i-Khanan, Hindi poet and a Navratna of Akbar
- Todar Mal, Finance Minister and one of the Navratnas of Akbar

== Television ==
- Shalini Arora
- Pankhuri Awasthy
- Jaya Bhattacharya
- Aadesh Chaudhary
- Yuvika Chaudhary
- Parul Chauhan
- Aparna Dixit
- Kiran Dubey
- Ravi Dubey
- Farman Haider
- Kanika Maheshwari
- Pravisht Mishra
- Akshita Mudgal
- Hiba Nawab
- Surendra Pal
- Aryan Pandit
- Pavitra Punia
- Randeep Rai
- Rahi Masoom Raza
- Rukhsar Rehman
- Soumya Seth
- Gajendra Singh
- Param Singh
- Raju Srivastav
- Aditya Srivastava
- Kushal Tandon
- Sumbul Touqeer
- Sanjeev Tyagi
- Aru Krishansh Verma

== Satire, comedy, cartoons ==
- Akbar Allahabadi, poet and satirist
- Anubhav Singh Bassi, actor, YouTuber and stand-up comedian. His standup career started after an open mic in 2017.
- Kaka Hathrasi, satirist
- Kaak (b. 1940, Harish Chandra Shukla), cartoonist
- K. P. Saxena
- Raju Srivastav, actor and stand up comedian
- Aseem Trivedi (born 17 February 1987) is an Indian political cartoonist and activist, known for his anti corruption campaign Cartoons Against Corruption
- Tun Tun, comedian
- Rajpal Yadav, actor and comedian

== Photographers ==
- Darogha Ubbas Alli (aka Darogha Abbas Ali) was a 19th-century Indian engineer and photographer.
- Lala Deen Dayal, Indian photographer
- Farhat Basir Khan (born 1957) is an Indian photographer.
- Tarun Khiwal (born 1967), Indian fashion and commercial photographer
- Richa Maheshwari is a Delhi-based fashion photographer.
- Virendra Prabhakar (1928 – 2015) was an Indian press photojournalist, cited by the Limca Book of Records as the longest serving press photojournalist.
- Devi Prasad (1921 – 2011) was an Indian artist and peace activist. He was a pioneering studio potter, painter, designer, photographer, art educator and peace activist.

== Criminals ==
- Atiq Ahmed, politician turned criminal
- Mukhtar Ansari, Ex MLA
- Sibgatullah Ansari
- Khalid Azim
- Munna Bajrangi
- Thug Behram
- Dadua, dacoit
- Phoolan Devi, dacoit turned politician
- Vikas Dubey
- Nirbhay Gujjar, dacoit
- Ravinder Kumar (serial killer)
- Rasheed Masood
- Abdul Subhan Qureshi, terrorist
- Sher Singh Rana
- Abu Salem, underworld criminal
- Satish
- Devendra Sharma
- Sri Prakash Shukla, gangster
- Daku Man Singh, dacoit
- Ajay Mishra Teni
- Hari Shankar Tiwari
- Shekhar Tiwari
- Amarmani Tripathi
- Anand Sen Yadav
- Chavviram Singh Yadav, dacoit
- D. P. Yadav
- Neera Yadav

== Others ==
- Malini Agarwal (born 26 May 1977), also known as "MissMalini", is an Indian digital influencer, TV host, entrepreneur, and author.
- Sampat Pal Devi, women's rights activist
- Sheila Dikshit, former Chief Minister of Delhi
- Shiv Prasad Gupta (28 June 1883 – 24 April 1944) was a visionary, philanthropist, a leader of the Indian Freedom Movement and the founder of the Mahatma Gandhi Kashi Vidyapeeth.
- Jayachandra, historical figure
- Abdul Karim, Munshi to Queen Victoria
- Tabassum Mansoor, Indian educationist in Libya
- Rahul Mishra (born 1979), fashion designer
- Begum Samru, historical figure
- Deep Tyagi, pioneer of family planning programme in India
- Mohammad Waliullah was a senior judge of the Allahabad High Court in India.

== Photo gallery ==
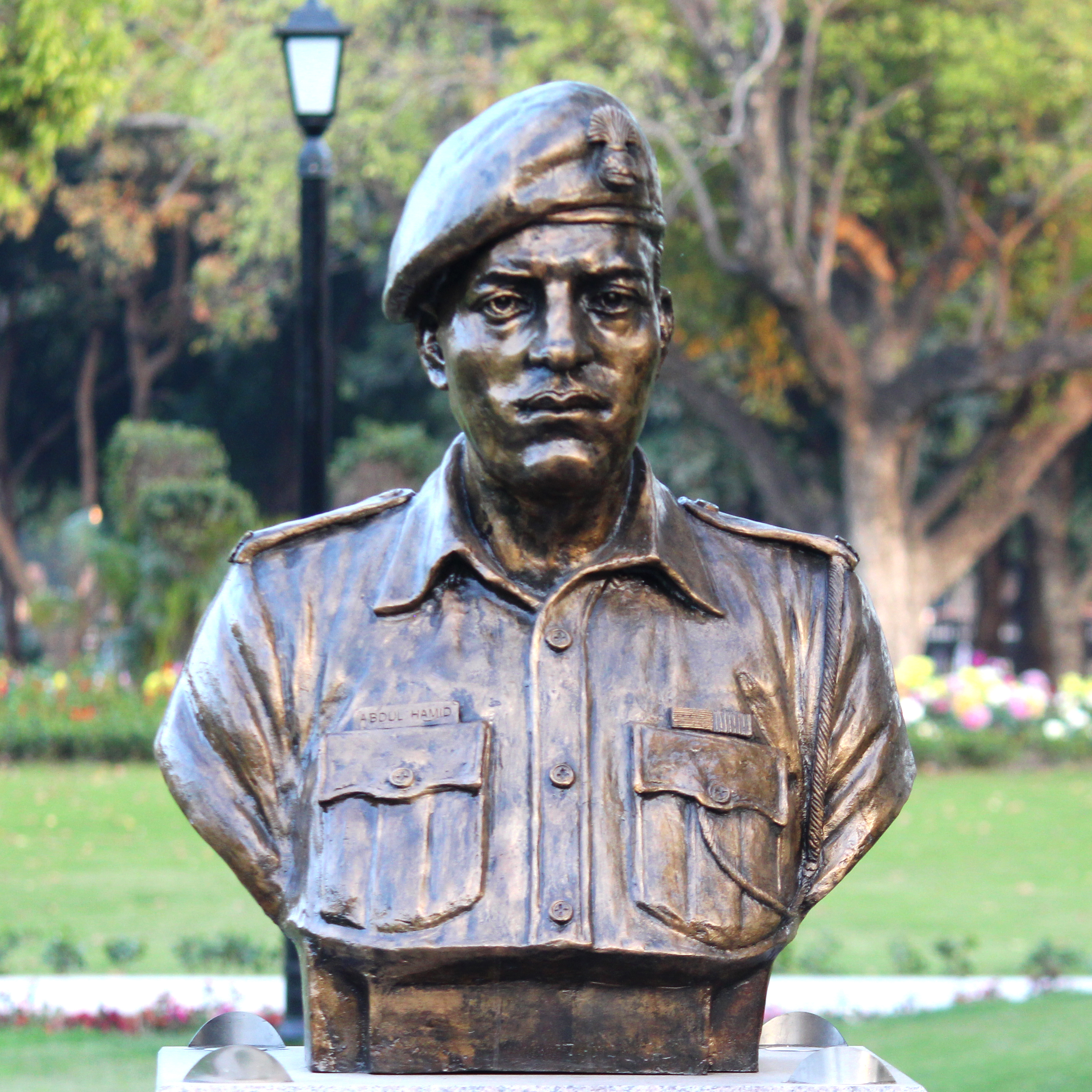
Abdul Hamid's bust at Param Yodha Sthal, National War Memorial, New Delhi

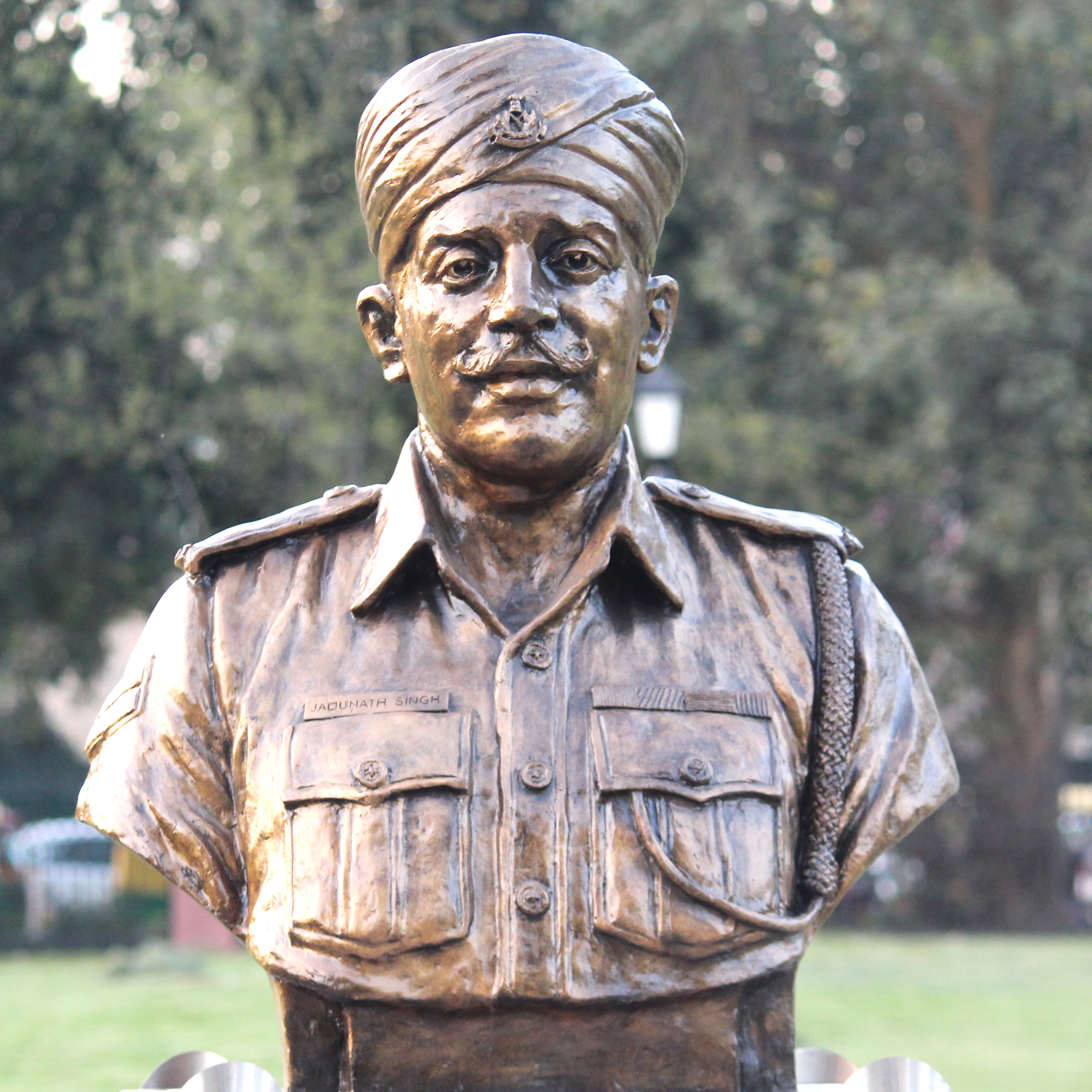
Jadunath Singh's statue at Param Yodha Sthal, National War Memorial, New Delhi

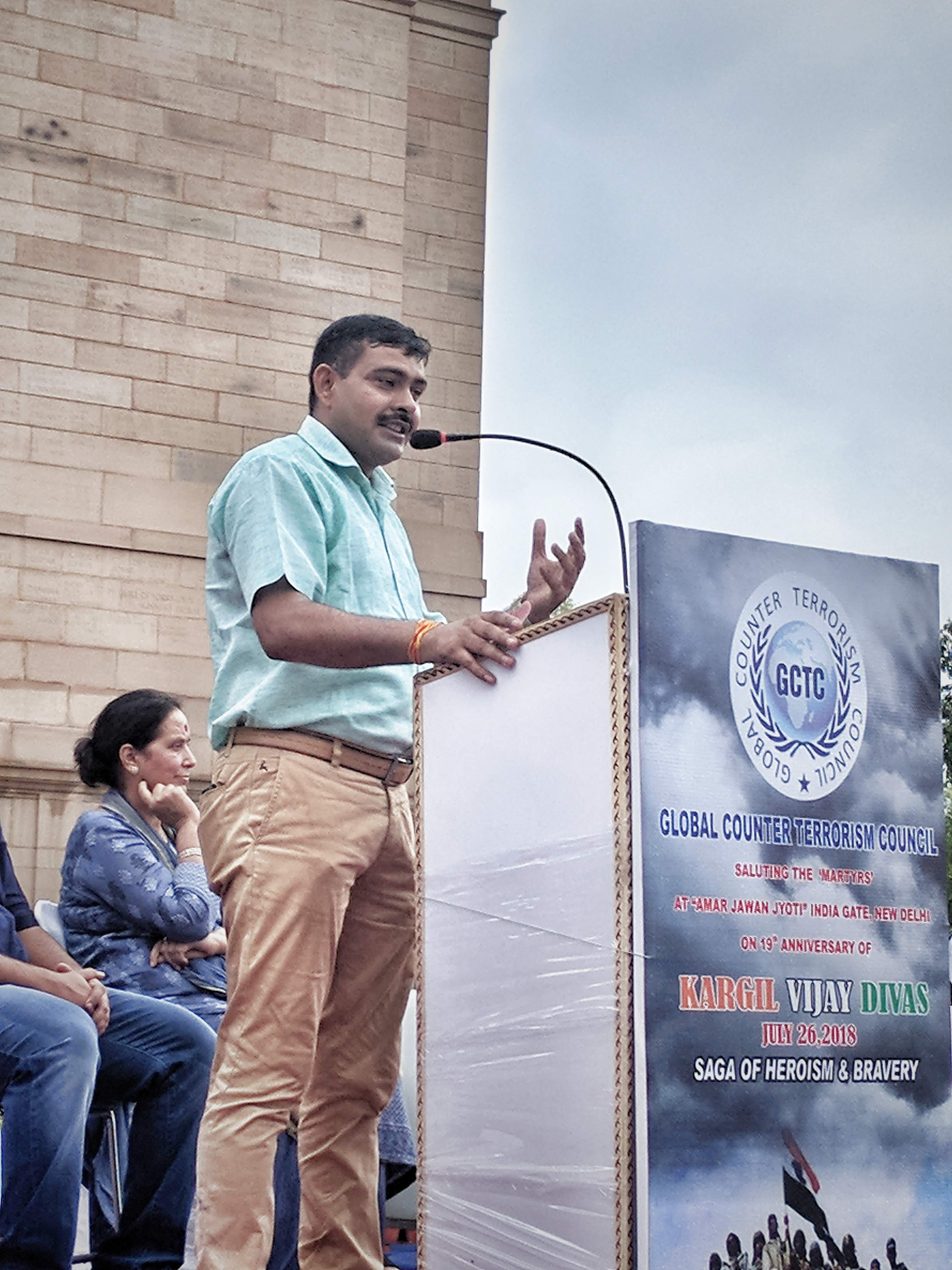
Param Vir Chakra Awardee Yogendra Yadav at India Gate on Kargil Vijay Divas, 2018

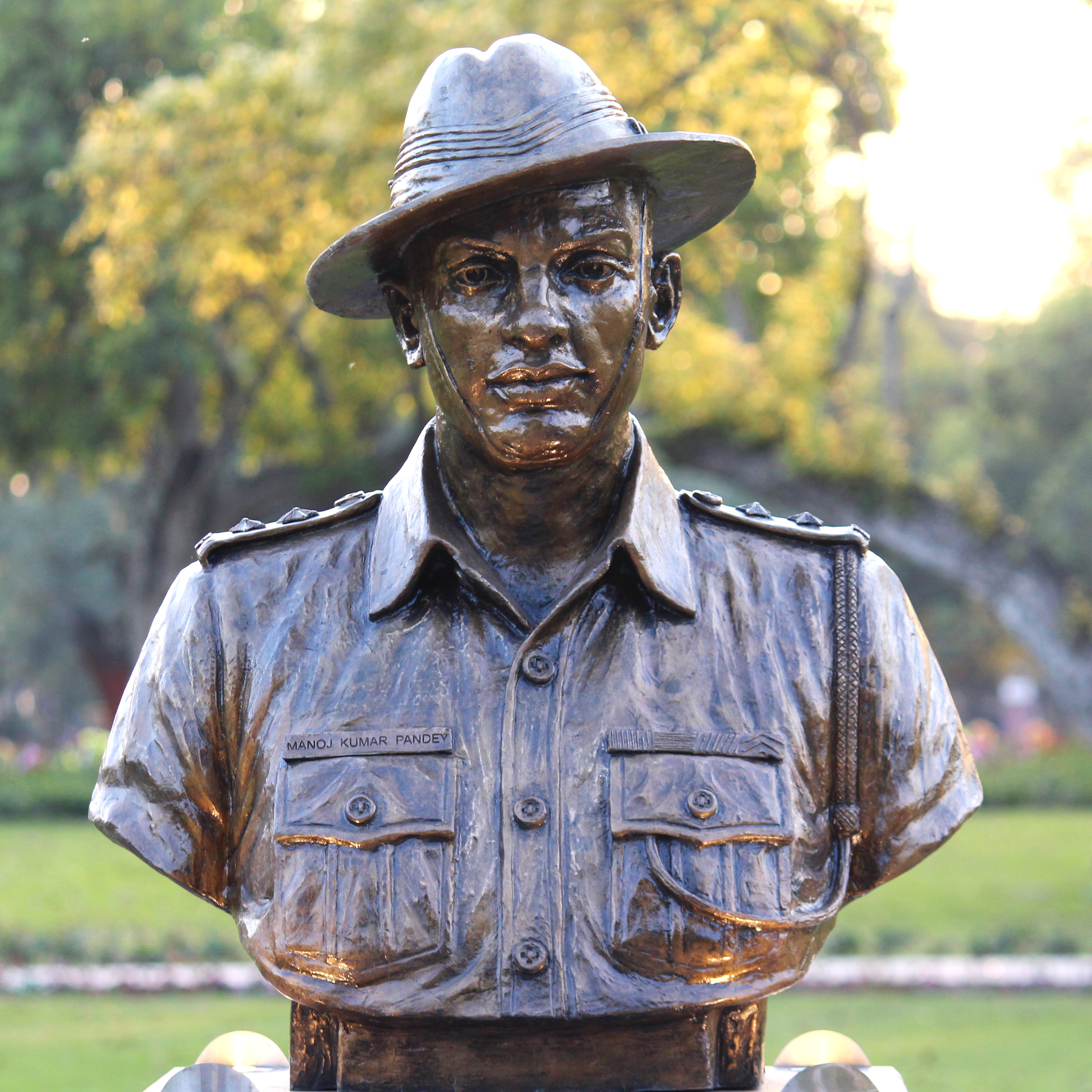
Manoj Pandey's statue at Param Yodha Sthal, National War Memorial, New Delhi

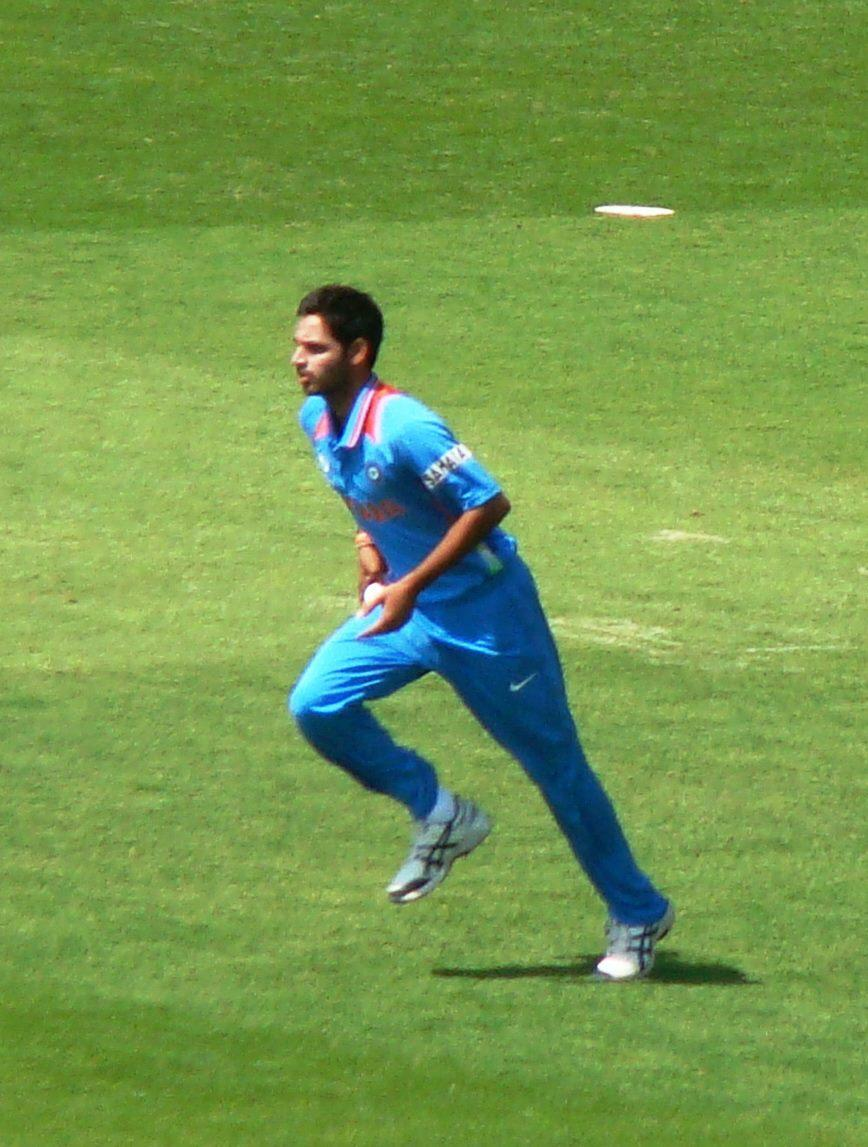
Bhuvneshwar Kumar

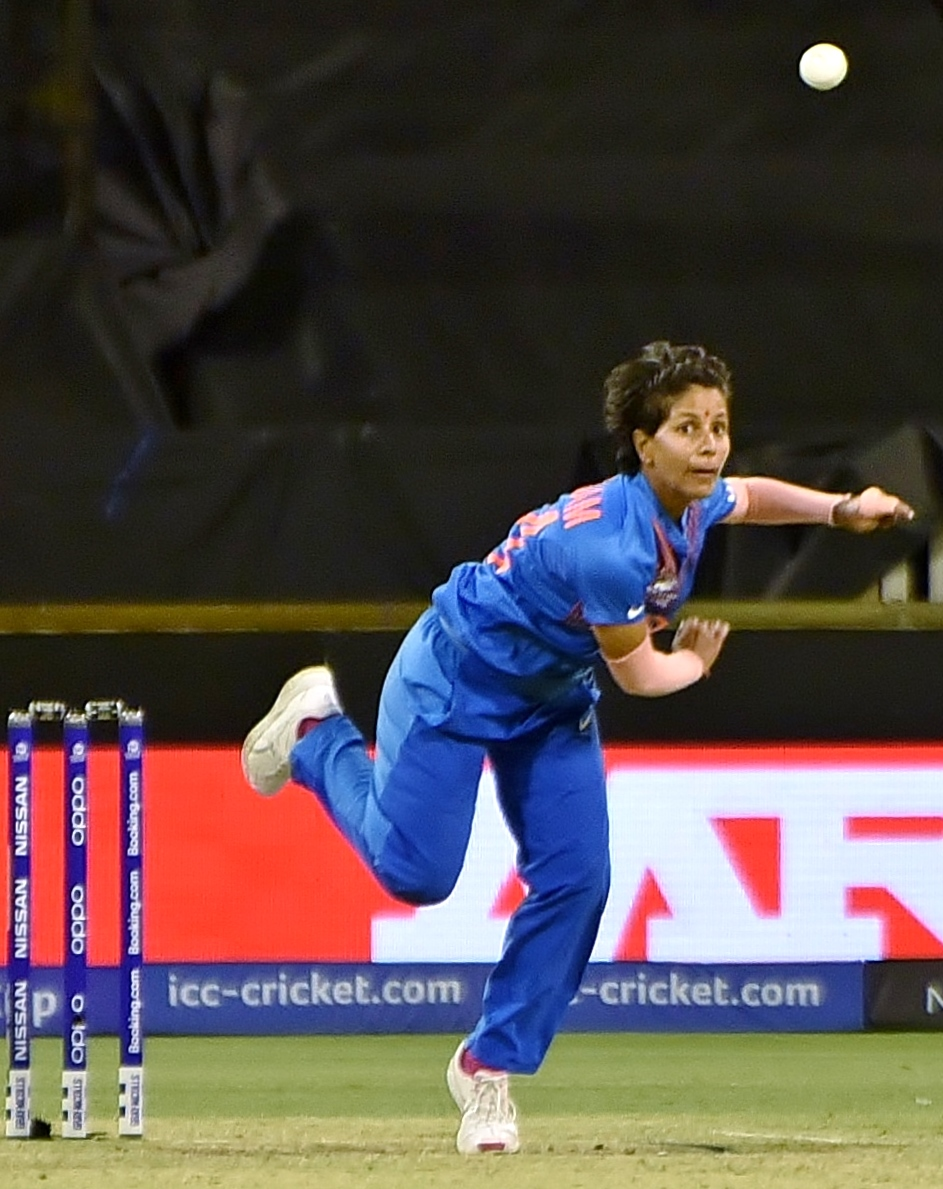
Poonam Yadav bowling for India against Bangladesh during the 2020 ICC Women's T20 World Cup

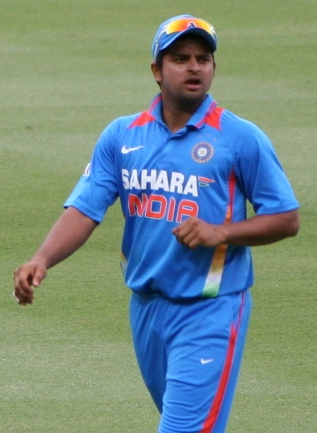
Suresh Raina

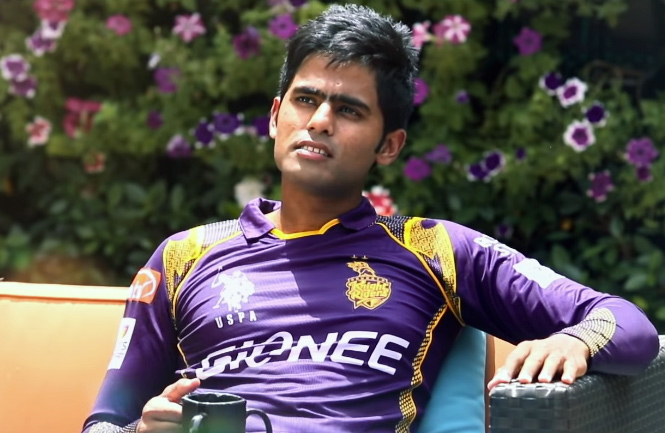
Surya in Kolkata Knight Riders apparel during the 2017 Indian Premier League

== See also ==
- Lists of Indian people
- List of people from Purvanchal
- States and union territories of India
