= Neera Yadav =

Neera Yadav may refer to:

- Neera Yadav (civil servant)
- Neera Yadav (politician)
