= Narendra Mohan =

Indian businessman and newspaper publisher (1934–2002)

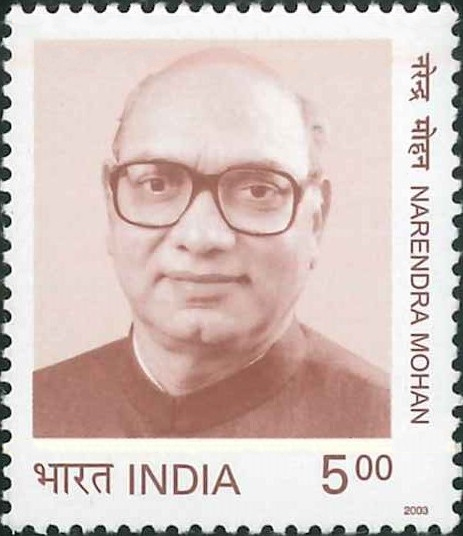
- Mohan on a 2003 stamp of India
- Born: 10 October 1934; Kalpi, Jalaun, Uttar Pradesh, India
- Died: 20 September 2002 (aged 67); New Delhi, India
- Occupations: Past chairman and managing director, Jagran Group

Narendra Mohan (10 October 1934 – 20 September 2002) was an Indian journalist, newspaper publisher, and politician. He served as managing director of Jagran Prakashan, and Chairman of the Press Trust of India. Mohan was the son of Puran Chandra Gupta, founder of the Hindi-language newspaper Dainik Jagran, of which Mohan also served as publisher.

== Early life ==
Mohan was born on 10 October 1934 in Kalpi in the Uttar Pradesh state of India. In 1947 he moved to Kanpur where his father Puran Chandra Gupta set up the Hindi newspaper, Dainik Jagran.

== Career ==
According to the Telegraph India, as chairman of the Press Trust of India, Mohan campaigned for the introduction of foreign direct investment in print media.

He was nominated to the Rajya Sabha in 1996, making him a Bharatiya Janata Party Member of Parliament with encouragement from senior party leader Lal Krishna Advani.

== Personal life ==
Narendra Mohan had two sons and a daughter. Sanjay Gupta, Mohan's eldest son, is the editor-in-chief and CEO of Dainik Jagran.

== Death ==
Mohan died at Apollo Hospital in New Delhi on 20 September 2002 at the age of 67, following multi-organ failure.

== Selected publications ==
Narendra Mohan wrote five books:

- Dharm Aur Sampradayikta (1996)
- Hindutva (1998)
- Aaj Ki Rajniti aur Bhrashtachar (1999)
- Bharatiya Sanskriti (2017)
- Dharma and Communalism (2022)
