= Haji Kallan =

Indian businessman and philanthropist (1886–?)

Haji Aijaz Hussain (Urdu: حاجی ایجاز حسين), popularly known as Haji Kallan (Urdu: حاجی کلن) (21 April 1886 – ?) was an Indian businessman and philanthropist. Born in Moradabad, North-Western Provinces, he was the first exporter of brass handicrafts from Moradabad. Due to his popularity many place have been named after him in the city of Moradabad, like Gali Haji Kallan (street), the Adam and Eve Mission Hospital is better known as Haji Kallan Hospital and numerous smaller landmarks. He was the second son of Nadir Hussain and the grandson of Sheikh Elahie Bux (brother of Sheikh Hussein Bux).
