= Shekhar Tiwari =

Indian politician

Shekhar Tiwari is an Indian politician from the Bahujan Samaj Party, currently in life imprisonment for murder. He was elected as chairman of the Dibiyapur municipal Panchayat in Auraiya district of Uttar Pradesh in 1997. He was elected to the UP Vidhan Sabha as a BSP candidate in May 2007. Soon after, his wife Vibha was elected as chairman of the Dibiyapur panchayat.

According to police reports, Tiwari was being investigated in 14 criminal cases relating to government contracts and extortion, but after he was elected as MLA, 10 cases were closed for want of evidence.

He is a graduate from the University of Allahabad, and had earlier been a member of the Indian National Congress. He joined the BSP in 2007 during Mayawati's attempt to forge a tie with the Brahmin community.

== Manoj Gupta murder ==
On 24 December 2008, five days before the annual birthday bash for party leader Mayawati, Tiwari forcibly entered the house of Public Works Department engineer Manoj K Gupta in Dibiyapur. Along with a gang that included three policemen, Tiwari mercilessly beat up Gupta, fracturing his skull and possibly giving him electric shocks. Tiwari then brought the fatally wounded Gupta to the police station, and Gupta died two hours later at the district hospital.

Media reports repeatedly insisted that the lynching had occurred because Gupta had refused to pay a large sum (possibly Rs 5 to 50 lakhs) towards Mayawati's birthday party. Tiwari and Mayawati initially denied all such claims, but the then in-charge of the Dibiyapur police station, inspector Hoshiyar Singh, gave an interview on TV stating that the group had gone primarily to extract funds. . BSP Auraiya district president Yogendra Dohre was also implicated in the murder.

Over the next year, there were reports of laxity in the investigations, but the opposition parties and media kept up the pressure. Eventually, the Supreme Court of India intervened owing to tardy progress in the case. Eventually, Tiwari was sentenced to life imprisonment along with several others.

Later on High court acquitted Hoshiar Singh.
