= Qamar Rahman =

Indian scientist

- Born: Shahjahanpur
- Citizenship: Indian
- Education: St. John's College, Agra
- Awards: Vigyan Vibhushan Award (2013)
- Scientific career
- Fields: Nanotoxicology, Pulmonary Biochemistry, Geno Toxicity
- Workplaces: University of Lucknow, IITR

Qamar Rahman is an Indian scientist who has worked extensively in the last 40 years to understand the physiological effects of nanoparticles. She is known internationally for her work on asbestosis, the effects of slate dust and other household and environmental particulate pollution and means for improving occupational health.

She is currently the Dean of Research Science and Technology at Amity University, Lucknow, India.

Rostock University, Germany awarded an honorary doctorate to her in 2009. Rahman is the first Indian to receive this honor from this 600-year-old university. She has studied extensively on toxicity of asbestos, soot and many other pollutants. She has also made a film on the subject of women getting exposed to toxic chemicals in the work place

Her most cited paper has been cited 450 times, according to Google Scholar.
