= Pawan Gupta (wushu) =

Indian Wushu player and martial artist

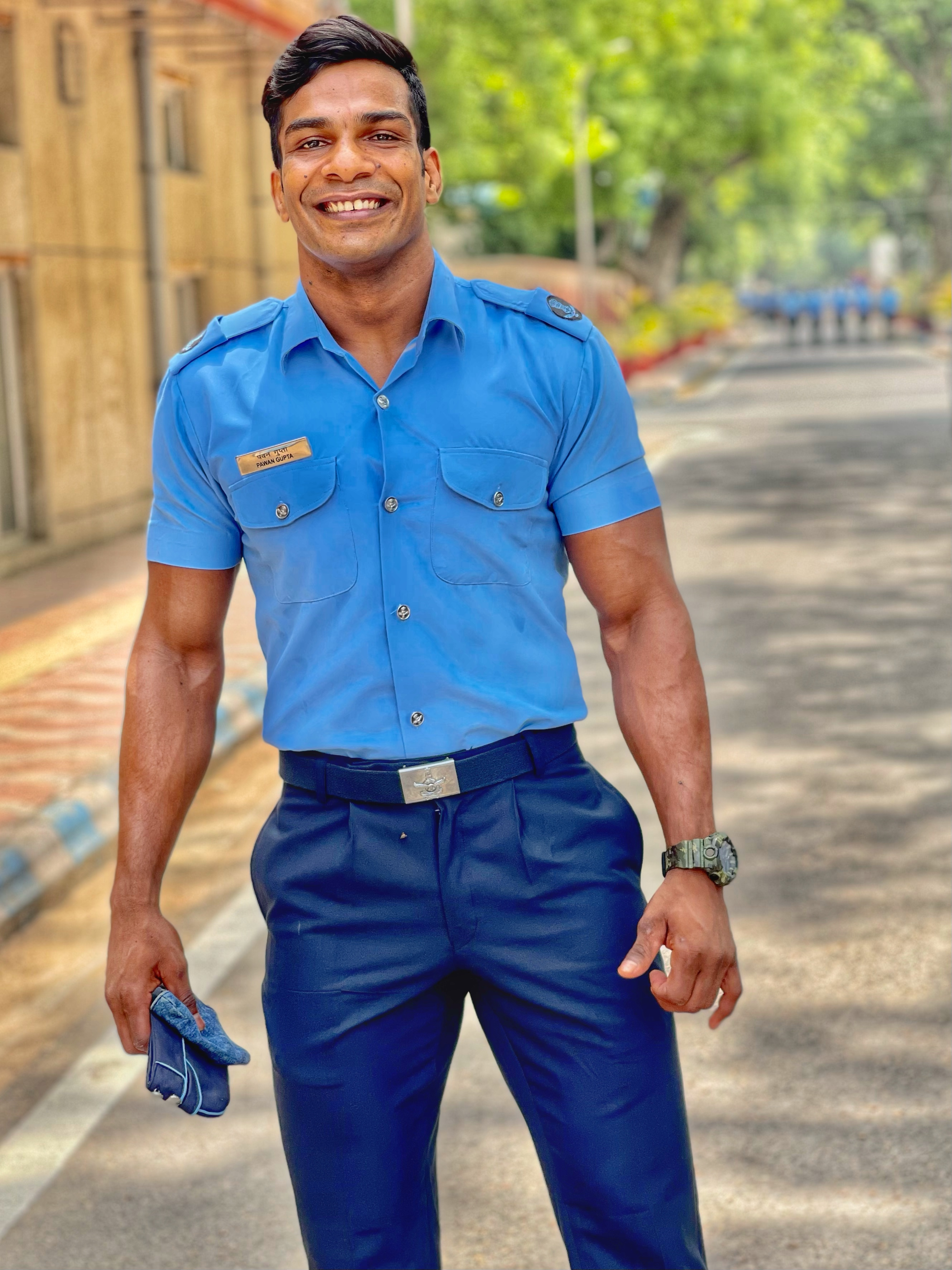
- Pawan Gupta

Personal information
- National team: India
- Born: Uttar Pradesh, India
- Occupation: Wushu player
- Employer: Indian Air Force

Sport
- Country: India
- Sport: Wushu
- Event: Sanda
Medal record
Men's Sanda
Representing India
Asian Championships
Bronze medal – third place	2012 Hanoi	65 kg
Asian Championships (sanda)
Silver medal – second place	2017 Singapore	70 kg

Pawan Gupta is a sanda fighter from India. He won a bronze medal at the 2012 Asian Wushu Championships held in Hanoi, Vietnam in men's Sanda 65 kg in. He represented India and won a silver medal in the Asian Sanda Championships, held in Singapore. Gupta is currently working with Indian Air Force since 2014.

== Career ==
In the 8th Asian Wushu Championships held in Hanoi, Vietnam, Gupta won a bronze medal. In the 2015 National Games of India, which was held in Kerala, India, he won a bronze medal. In 2017, he won a silver medal at the Asian Sanda Championships, which was held in Singapore.

At the 2017 International Wushu Championships, held in Armenia, where he competed in the 70 kg men's category and won a bronze medal. He represented India at the Shanghai Cooperation Organisation's International Wushu Sanda Tournament in the men's 75 kg in 2018, where he was placed third. A year later, in 2019, Pawan competed in the Batumi Open International Wushu Tournament, held in Batumi, Georgia, where he won a silver medal.

== See also ==
- Kuldeep Handoo
- Praveen Kumar (Wushu)
