= Mohammad Waliullah =

Mohammad Waliullah was a senior judge of the Allahabad High Court in India.

He was born in Gorakhpur district, Uttar Pradesh, to Mohammad Kasim Ali Mukhtar and Shahzadi Bibi.

== Judgeship ==
Mohammad Waliullah was appointed as a judge of Allahabad High Court in July 1944. He was promoted to a senior judge and was on course to be considered as the chief justice of the court. He died in office on 14 October 1952.

== Early life ==
Mohammad Waliullah was born in village Gahripar (Birai Buzurg) near Urwa Bazar in Gorakhpur district, United Province (now Uttar Pradesh). He received his law education from England.
