= Ayodhya Prasad Upadhyay =

Indian writer (1865–1947)

Vidyavachaspati Ayodhya Singh Upadhyay
- Born: Pandit Bholanath Upadhyay; 15 April 1865; Azamgarh, North-Western Provinces, British India
- Died: 16 March 1947 (aged 81); Azamgarh, United Provinces, British India
- Occupations: Writer, essayist, scholar, poet
- Writing career
- Pen name: ‘Hari Oudh',

Ayodhya Singh Upadhyay ‘Hari Oudh', (15 April 1865 – 16 March 1947) was a writer of Hindi literature. He was the Chairman of the Hindi Sahitya Sammelan and had been conferred the title of Vidyavachaspati.

== Life ==
Hari Oudh was born in the year 1865 AD in a place called Nizamabad in Azamgarh district of Uttar Pradesh. His father's name was Pandit Bholanath Upadhyaya, and mother's name was Rukmani Devi. His early education was in Nizamabad and Azamgarh. At the age of five, his uncle started teaching him Persian. After passing the middle examination from Nizamabad, Hari Oudh went to study English at Queen's College, Kashi, but due to ill health, he had to leave the college. He studied Sanskrit, Urdu, Persian and English etc. at home and married Nirmala Kumari in Nizamabad in 1884.

In the year 1889, Hari Oudh got a government job. After retiring from this post in 1932, he taught for several years as an unpaid teacher in the Hindi Department of the Banaras Hindu University. He continued to work on this post till 1942. After that he moved back to Nizamabad. After being relieved from this teaching job, he continued to do literature-service work in his village. His literature-service earned him considerable fame. The Hindi Sahitya Sammelan made him the chairman of the conference and honored him with the title of Vidyavachaspati. He died in 1947AD at Azamgarh. His family uses his pen name as their surname.

== Literary work ==
He was primarily a poet, but he contributed to other genres of Hindi literature as well. Priya-Pravaas, his epic is considered to be one of the landmarks of Hindi poetry.

- Priya Pravaas
- Vaidehi Vanvaas
- Hindi Bhasha Aur Uske Sahitya Ka Vikas
- Karam Veer
- Ek Boond
- Phool aur Kanta
- Parijat
- Kalplata
- Phool Patte
- Ek Tinka
- Rash Kalash
- Chubhte Chaupade
- Chokhe Chaupade
- Rukmini Parinay
- Theth Hindi Ka Thath
- Adhkhila Phool
