= Richa Maheshwari =

Fashion photographer

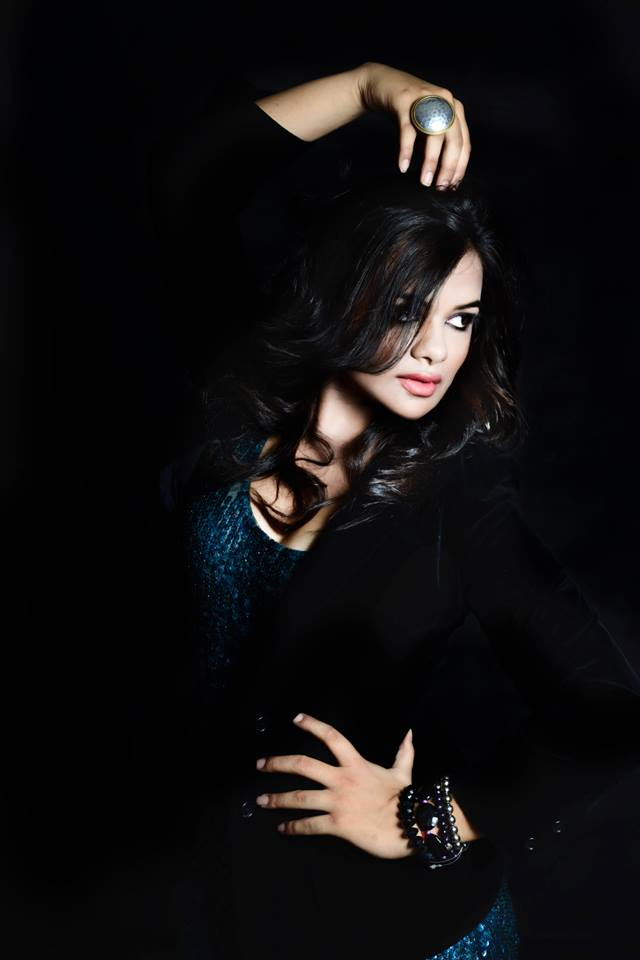
- Born: 23 September 1988 (age 38); Kanpur, Uttar Pradesh, India
- Occupation: Photographer
- Website: www.richamaheshwari.com

Richa Maheshwari (born 1988) is a fashion photographer based in Delhi, India. She started practicing fashion photography and short film making commercially after college, and later became the CEO of Richa Maheshwari Film & Photography.

== Personal life and work ==
Maheshwari was born in Kanpur, Uttar Pradesh, where her father is a businessman. Richa Maheshwari Films & Photography began with an idea while she was studying Fashion Communication in the National Institute of Fashion Technology (NIFT). She started practicing fashion photography while in college and making short films commercially after college. She had set up a small studio by the end of her college year.

== Notable works ==
Maheshwari is known for mixing her work with philanthropy. She has taught photography to the visually impaired at the National Association for the Blind (NAB) She launched “Anical 2015” on 20 December, along with Lala Textiles from Pakistan. She created the Anical (an animal welfare calendar), with the motive to bring a fashionable twist to the sad state of animals. Maheshwari launched another calendar "Silencing the Dark" which was dedicated to spreading awareness about blindness, along with Lala Textiles from Pakistan on 17th Dec 2015. The co. launched, Silencing the Dark campaign which focused on blindness awareness and the sorry state of visually impaired in the world. The launch of the calendar was followed by a small documentary stint and a fashion show wherein the blind kids walked the ramp along with the models. The launch was for the welfare of National Association for the Blind.

== Awards and records ==
Maheshwari is a fitness record holder. She made her way in Limca book of records for attempting maximum burpees, which is 46 in one minute. The world highest in one minute is 38 by a female. She is a gold medalist in communication design having gained few awards in her field which includes national award winner : Documentary and film-making, First prize in jury category of Creating Happiness, Organised by vedanta, Awards in Photography : For Research and efforts in high-speed photography and time-lapse photography by NIFT. Awards in Photography : For Most creative and innovative Communication Designer by NIFT. She is a gold medalist in communication design from NIFT and was nominated by Hindustan Times Young Woman of the Year awards.
