= Laxmi Raman Acharya =

Indian politician

Finance Minister Government of Uttar Pradesh
- In office 14 March 1967 – 27 March 1971

Personal details
- Born: 2 November 1914 Alwar, Rajasthan
- Died: 4 February 1997 (aged 82) Lucknow, Uttar Pradesh
- Party: INC
- Spouse: Suman Acharya
- Children: 7

Laxmi Raman Acharya (1914-1997) was the Finance Minister of the Indian state of Uttar Pradesh.
