= Bharat Bhushan (yogi) =

Indian Yogi

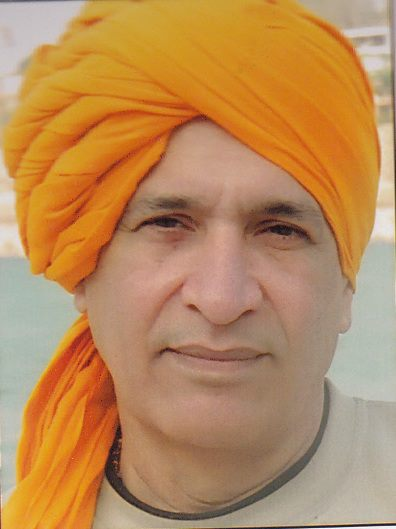
- Born: 30 April 1952 (age 73); Saharanpur, Uttar Pradesh, India
- Occupation: Yoga Guru
- Known for: Yoga, Body Building and Social work

Bharat Bhushan (born 30 April 1952) is an Indian yoga guru and honoured by Padma Shri for yoga in 1991.

== Biography ==
In 1971, Bhushan founded a yoga centre, Mokshayatan International Yogashram, at the age of 20. Having travelled a lot, he has been sharing his experience and expertise in yoga with Indian as well as foreign enthusiasts on different TV channels since 1978.

Bhushan has worked with the Indian armed forces, industries, scientists, schools, colleges and people of different religious faiths. He has been honoured with Awadh Samman- "life time Achievement Award" by Zee news & U.P. Government and "life time Achievement Award" for significant contribution to Health Care profession given by AIIMS (All India Institute of Medical Science)& AYUSH Ministry of Health.

He is involved in the yoga campaign called "Jago Bharat Dhyan Yog andolan" in collaboration with Zee Network.

Bhushan helped to initiate and conduct the first International Yoga Festival at Rishikesh.

From his college days he has made efforts to introduce yoga as part of the education system in universities and schools.

He initiated a campaign to preserve traditional form of yoga by using the traditional name bharat yoga and teaching traditional style of yoga through his school Mokshayatan International Yogashram.
