= Rashmi Tiwari =

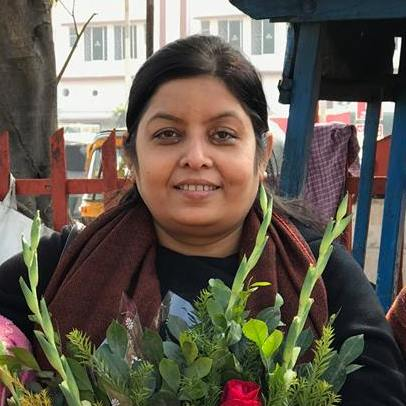
- Born: 1972 (age 53–54)
- Education: Banaras Hindu University
- Known for: Founder and Director of the Aahan Foundation for Social Change

Rashmi Tiwari is the Founder and Director of the Aahan Foundation for Social Change India, working to dismantle the machinery of trafficking. She is Fellow of Vital Voices (USA), Fellow of SIMP and a Certified Leadership Coach from NeuroLeadership Institute.

== Early life ==
Tiwari was born in 1972.

Tiwari had to face discrimination and social stigmas. She was a posthumous child and after evicting her house in Mumbai.

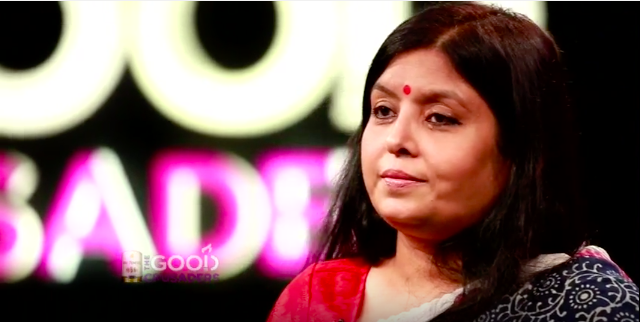
Tiwari was chosen as "The Good Crusader" by Times NOW for her work on anti-trafficking of tribal girls through Aahan Foundation.

She spent a year in Kanpur with one of her aunt and then moved to Varanasi where she completed her education and earned Ph.D degree in Economics from Banaras Hindu University which was awarded in the year 1998–99.

== Career ==
Tiwari was the associate director and then director of American Chambers of Commerce in India (AMCHAM)] from 2000 to 2008 and until quite recently she was spearheading the operations of associations of CEOs in CEO Clubs, India as the executive director.

She has been covered in the local and international media including the Washington Post for her work in the social sector with tribal girls and for mentoring & development of women leaders.
