= Puran Chandra Gupta =

Indian journalist (1912–1986)

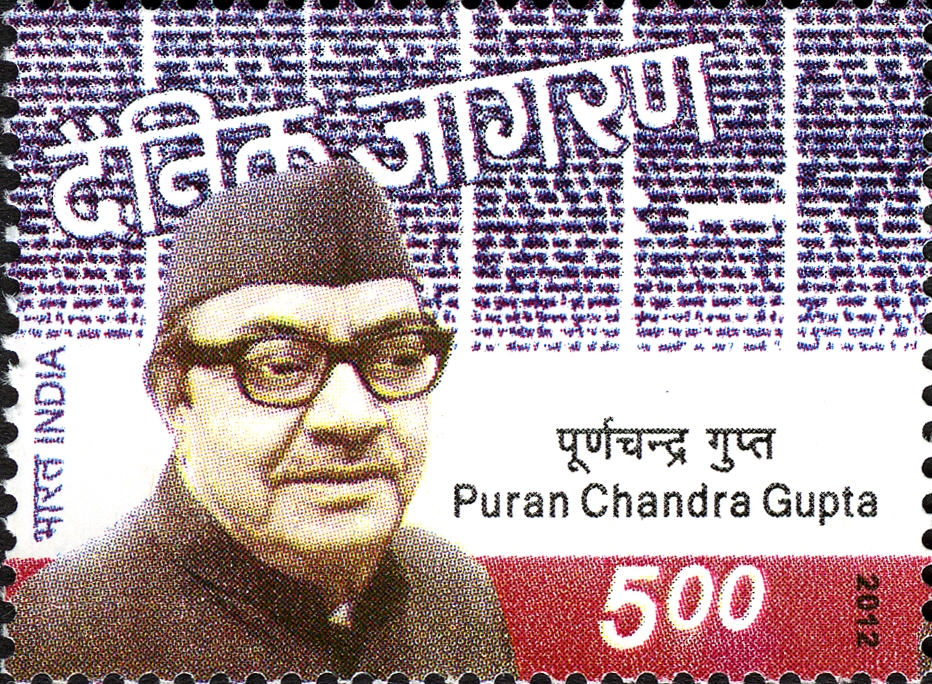
- Gupta on a 2012 stamp of India
- Born: 2 January 1912; Kalpi, Uttar Pradesh, India
- Died: 16 September 1986 (aged 74); India
- Occupations: Journalist, publisher

Puran Chandra Gupta (2 January 1912 – 16 September 1986) was an Indian journalist who founded the Dainik Jagran media group and the Hindi-language publication Dainik Jagran, which remains the most popular daily newspaper in India.

== Biography ==
Gupta was born in Kalpi, and educated in Kalpi and Varanasi. In 1940, he launched a nationalist weekly newspaper Swatantra in Kanpur. The newspaper was disapproved by the British administration and had to move to Jhansi. There in 1942 he started the daily newspaper Jagran, which in 1947 was renamed into Dainik Jagran. In 1975, Gupta was elected as chairman of the Press Trust of India. Besides, for 15 years he was an executive member of The Indian Newspaper Society and served as its Vice President.

== Legacy ==
In 1987, the Sri Puranchandra Gupta Smarak Trust was established in Kanpur. The trust is engaged in educational, spiritual, cultural, and philanthropic activities.

In 2012, a postage stamp was issued in his honour.
