= Neera Yadav (civil servant) =

Indian civil servant and fraudster

- Born: Bulandshahr, Uttar Pradesh, India
- Education: Welham Girls' School, Dehradun
- Occupation: Former officer of the Indian Administrative Service (IAS)
- Known for: IAS officer convicted for fraud
- Criminal charges: Misuse of official position, fraud
- Criminal penalty: Four years' rigorous imprisonment
- Criminal status: Convicted
- Spouse: Mahendra Singh Yadav

Neera Yadav is a former officer of the Indian Administrative Service (IAS) who was convicted of fraud. She is originally from Bulandshahr, Uttar Pradesh, India,

== Early life ==
Yadav studied at Welham Girls' School, Dehradun. She was part of the 1971 batch of IAS service graduates. She is married to Mahendra Singh Yadav, an officer of the Indian Police Service who later resigned from the service to pursue his political career.

== Career ==
She was posted to different positions in the bureaucracy in Uttar Pradesh. She became well known as district magistrate of Jaunpur district during the flood crisis for her daring rescue operations. Later she was selected among the top three most corrupt IAS officers of Uttar Pradesh in a vote of her colleagues. She was appointed the Chief Secretary of Uttar Pradesh, later resigning the position after a decision by the Supreme Court of India, thus becoming the second IAS officer in succession after Akhand Pratap Singh to have done so.

After retirement, she joined the Bharatiya Janata Party in 2009 but resigned after media questions over the decision.

== Crime ==
In December 2010 Yadav was sentenced to four years' rigorous imprisonment after being convicted of misusing her official position as IAS officer of Uttar Pradesh to allot land fraudulently in Noida to Flex Industries, owned by industrialist Ashok Chaturvedi.

On 20 November 2012 a special CBI court sentenced Neera Yadav to 3 years' imprisonment for the Noida plot scam that happened between 1993 and 1995. At that time she was serving as the Noida Authority CEO. She fraudulently allotted one plot for herself, one for her husband and one each for her two daughters [a total of 4 plots for her and her family], knowing that the rules allowed only one plot of land to one family.

On 2 August 2017 the Supreme Court of India sentenced Neera Yadav to two years' imprisonment in the Noida land allotment scam.
