= List of Aligarh Muslim University alumni =

Aligarh Muslim University (abbreviated as AMU) is a public central university in Aligarh, India, which was originally established by Sir Syed Ahmad Khan as the Muhammadan Anglo-Oriental College in 1875. Muhammadan Anglo-Oriental College became Aligarh Muslim University in 1920. Many notable individuals have been affiliated with the college as graduates, non-graduating attendees, faculty, staff, or administrators. The following is a list of notable Aligarh Muslim University alumni. (Note: The Mohammedan Anglo-Oriental College was transformed into the Aligarh Muslim University in 1920. Zakir Husain, Shaukat Ali, Fani Badayuni, and Mohammad Ali Jauhar graduated from the M. A. O. College when it was affiliated to the University of Calcutta (1875–1885) and University of Allahabad (1885–1920).)

== Arts and letters ==
=== Literature and journalism ===
Name	Class year	Degree	Notability	Ref.
Syed Mujtaba Ali	1926		Bengali author, journalist, academic, scholar and linguist	
Ahmed Ali			Urdu writer	
Akshay Kumar Jain	1940	LLB	journalist; former editor of Navbharat Times; Padma Bhushan recipient	
Arfa Khanum Sherwani			journalist	
Asghar Wajahat		Phd	Hindi scholar, fiction writer, novelist and playwright	
Asrar ul Haq Majaz	1936	BA	Urdu poet (better known as Majaz Lakhnawi)	
Azarmi Dukht Safavi			master of Persian literature, established Persian Language Research Center of the Aligarh University	
Bashir Badr		BA, MA, PhD	Urdu poet	
Basharat Peer			journalist, author, and political commentator	
Deeba Salim Irfan			author and poet	
Fani Badayuni		LLB	Urdu poet	
Hakim Ahmad Shuja			poet, playwright and scholar	
Hakim Syed Zillur Rahman	1955	BUMS	author and writer	
Hayatullah Ansari			author, journalist and politician	
Ismat Chughtai		BEd	Urdu novelist	
Kabir Ahmad Jaisi	1963; 1965; 1973	BA; MA in Persian; PhD	writer	
Punathil Kunjabdulla	1970	MBBS	writer	
Qazi Abdul Sattar		PhD	author	
Rahi Masoom Raza			author and poet	
Raja Rao			author, professor, and Padma Bhushan recipient	
Saadat Hasan Manto			Writer, playwright and author born in British India.	
Sajida Zaidi			educationist and Urdu writer	
Salma Siddiqui			Urdu novelist	
Salman Al-Azami			senior lecturer in English language at Liverpool Hope University	
Shan-ul-Haq Haqqee			Urdu poet	
Zafar Ali Khan			founder of Zamindar.	
Zahida Zaidi			scholar, poet, playwright, and literary critic	
Mushtaq Ahmad Yusufi		LLB	Pakistani writer and satirist	
Munier Choudhury			Bangladeshi educationist, playwright and literary critic	
Muzammil H. Siddiqi			Indian-American writer	
Nabakanta Barua			Assamese novelist and poet	
Khaleel-Ur-Rehman Azmi			Urdu poet	

=== Film and television ===
Name	Class year	Degree	Notability	Ref.
Akhlaq Mohammed Khan			urdu poet and lyricist (better known as Shahryar)	
Akhtar ul Iman		MA in Urdu	urdu poet and screenwriter in Hindi cinema	
Ali Sardar Jafri			urdu poet, critic, Hindi/Urdu film lyricist	
Anubhav Sinha	1998		film director	
Dalip Tahil			film actor	
Habib Tanveer			Hindi/urdu film actor and theater director	
Jan Nisar Akhtar		MA	urdu poet, Hindu/Urdu film lyricist	
Javed Akhtar			urdu poet, Hindu/Urdu film lyricist	
Khwaja Ahmad Abbas			Hindi/Urdu film director, novelist, screenwriter and journalist	
Muzaffar Ali	1966	BSc	film director	
Naseeruddin Shah	1971	BA	Bollywood actor	
Saeed Jaffrey			British-Indian actor	
Shaheed Latif			writer and director	
Surekha Sikri			film actress	
Aasif Sheikh	1984	Bsc Remote Sensing	Bollywood And Television actor	

== Business ==
Name	Class year	Degree	Notability	Ref.
Frank F Islam		MSc	entrepreneur, investor and philanthropist; head of the FI Investment Group; founder and CEO of the QSS Group	

== Humanities and Social Sciences ==
Name	Class year	Degree	Notability	Ref.
Abdul Haq			Urdu scholar and linguist	
Abul Kalam Qasmi	1973, 1975, 1980	BA, MA, PHD	Urdu critic and former dean of the Faculty of Arts at the Aligarh Muslim University	
A. H. Nizami	1929, 1931, 1934	Intermediate, B.A.,M.A.	Historian	
Irfan Habib			historian	
Ishwari Prasad			historian	
K. K. Muhammed	1975		Archeologist and Padma Shri recipient	
Obaidur Rahman Siddiqui			well known historian from Ghazipur	
Mohammed Ziauddin Ahmed Shakeb			Historian and a literary critic	
Haroon Khan Sherwani			historian	
Jalaluddin Umri			writer and religious scholar	
Abul Lais Siddiqui			Pakistani author, researcher, critic, linguist and scholar of Urdu literature and linguistics.	

== Science and Technology ==
Name	Class year	Degree	Notability	Ref.
Pucadyil Ittoop John	1972	PhD	Plasma physicist, Padma Shri recipient	
[[Sultan Ahmed Sidduiqe (professor)physicistGold Medalist|Sultan Ahmed Sidduiqe]]		BSc	Cosmologist, Physicist Saif SR, Author, Poet and Pharmacologist, Honoured as the Youngest Medical AUthor in the world, Library of Congress USA C No RM105S252005	
Ajay Pratap Singh	1992; 1994	B.Sc; M.Sc.		https://www.umc.edu/Faculty/Singh_Ajay_P
Asad Ullah Khan			microbiologist, N-Bios laureate	
Ashok Seth	1978	MBBS	cardiologist	
Divya Jain			software engineer	
Hassan Nasiem Siddiquie	1954; 1956	BSc; MSc	marine geologist, Padma Shri recipient and Shanti Swarup Bhatnagar laureate	
K. P. Mohanakumar	1979	MSc	chemical biologist, N-Bios laureate	
Kazi Mobin-Uddin			inventor of the inferior vena cava filter	
Mansur Hoda			scientist in the area of appropriate technology in India	
Qudsia Tahseen	1984; 1987;1989	MSc; MPhil; PhD	zoologist	
Shahid Jameel	1977	BSc	virologist, Shanti Swarup Bhatnagar laureate	
Syed Ziaur Rahman	1995; 2000; 2015	MBBS, MD	pharmacologist	
Ishrat Hussain Usmani			Pakistani atomic physicist	

== Politics and law ==
=== Heads of state and government ===
Name	Class year	Degree	Notability	Ref.
Ayub Khan	did not graduate		2nd President of Pakistan	
Fazal Ilahi Chaudhry	1924	LLB	5th President of Pakistan	
Khawaja Nazimuddin		BA in Sociology	2nd Governor General of Pakistan; 2nd Prime Minister of Pakistan	
Liaquat Ali Khan	1918	BSc in Political Science; LLB	first Prime Minister of Pakistan	
Malik Ghulam Muhammad		BA in accountancy	3rd Governor General of Pakistan	
Mohamed Amin Didi			first President of the Maldives	
Mohammad Hamid Ansari			12th Vice President of India	
Muhammad Mansur Ali		MA	3rd Prime Minister of Bangladesh	
Zakir Husain			3rd President of India	

=== Chief ministers and governors ===
Name	Class year	Degree	Notability	Ref.
Abdul Ghafoor		MA; LLB	former Chief Minister of Bihar	
Arif Mohammad Khan			Governor of Bihar	
Babu Parmanand		LLB	former Governor of Haryana	
Fida Mohammad Khan	1945	LLB	former Governor of North-West Frontier Province in Pakistan	
Ghulam Mohammed Sadiq			former Chief Minister of Jammu and Kashmir	
Ghulam Mohammad Shah			former Chief Minister of Jammu and Kashmir	
Mohammed Usman Arif		LLB	former Governor of Uttar Pradesh	
Mirza Mohammad Afzal Beg		LLB	former Deputy Chief Minister of Jammu and Kashmir	
Mufti Mohammad Sayeed			former Chief Minister of Jammu and Kashmir and Minister of Home Affairs	
Sahib Singh Verma		MA in Library Science	former Chief Minister of Delhi	
Sardar Bahadur Khan		LLB	former Chief Minister of Khyber Pakhtunkhwa	
Sheikh Abdullah	1930	MSc in Chemistry	former Prime Minister of Jammu and Kashmir	
Sikandar Hayat Khan			former Governor of United Punjab and former President of BCCI	
Syeda Anwara Taimur			former Chief Minister of Assam	
Syed Mir Qasim			former Chief Minister of Jammu and Kashmir	
Abdul Qayyum Khan			former Chief Minister of North-West Frontier Province	

=== Other politicians, civil servants, and diplomats ===
Name	Class year	Degree	Notability	Ref.
Abdul Ghani Lone			Kashmiri politician	
Abdur Rab Nishtar		LLB	Muslim League leader	
Abdullah Rasheed		BA. Econ	Regional Director, Asia-Pacific Region, World Organization of the Scout Movement	
Abida Ahmed			Member of Parliament, Lok Sabha	
Ali Ahmed Fazeel			former Attorney General of Pakistan	
A. T. M. Mustafa		LLB	Federal Minister of Pakistan	
Azam Khan	1974	LLB	Member of Parliament, Lok Sabha	
Khan Habibullah Khan	1926		1st Chairman of the Senate of Pakistan	
Khwaja Haleem			Member of Legislative Assembly	
Hamidullah Khan			the last ruling Nawab of Bhopal	
Humayun Rashid Choudhury	1947		former President of the United Nations General Assembly and Minister of Foreign Affairs of Bangladesh	
Inamul Haque Khan		BA and MA in English literature	former Minister of Interior and Minister of Housing and Works of Pakistan	
Jamal Khwaja		M.A. in Philosophy	Member of Parliament, Lok Sabha	
Kazi Syed Karimuddin			Member of Parliament, Rajya Sabha	
Khan Abdul Ghaffar Khan			Pashtun Leader and Indian independence activist	
M. A. Gaffar	1933	BEd	Member of the Chamber of Nationalities of Burma	
Mohsina Kidwai			Member of Parliament, Rajya Sabha	
Moinul Hoque Choudhury	1946; 1947	MA in History; LLB	Member of Parliament, Lok Sabha	
Munawwar Ali		LLB	Speaker of East Pakistan Provincial Assembly	
Ormsin Chivapruck				
P. K. Abdu Rabb			Member of Legislative Assembly of Kerala	
Rafi Ahmed Kidwai			Leader of Indian National Congress; Independent India's first Communication Minister	
Roedad Khan	1946	MA in English history in	former Minister of Accountability of Pakistan	
Shabnam Gani Lone			Kashmiri lawyer and politician	
Syed Zafar Islam		BSc; MSc	Investment Banker and Member of Parliament in the Rajya Sabha, former Director at Deutsche Bank and Spokesperson of Bharatiya Janata Party	
M. A. G. Osmani	1938		Military leader and politician from Bangladesh	
Yusuf Dadoo			South African leader and activist	
Kasim Razvi		LLB	Indian politician in the princely state of Hyderabad	
Sultan Salahuddin Owaisi			Member of Parliament, Lok Sabha	
Manzoor Alam Quraishi			Indian Civil Service 1941 batch	
M. Riaz Hamidullah			High Commissioner of Bangladesh to India	

=== Jurists ===
Name	Class year	Degree	Notability	Ref.
Baharul Islam			former Judge of the Supreme Court of India	
Mufti Baha-ud-din Farooqi			former Judge of the Jammu and Kashmir High Court	
Syed Murtaza Fazl Ali			former Judge of the Supreme Court of India	
Saiyed Saghir Ahmad			former Judge of the Supreme Court of India	
Ram Prakash Sethi	1961		former Judge of the Supreme Court of India	
N. R. Madhava Menon		LLM, PhD	legal educationist	
Zahirul Hasnain Lari	1930	LL.B	Justice, Sindh High Court	

== Religion ==
Name	Class year	Degree	Notability	Ref.
Abul Kalam Qasmi Shamsi			Islamic scholar and author	
Muhibbullah Lari Nadwi			Islamic scholar and Principal of Darul Uloom Nadwatul Ulama	
Aziz al-Hasan Ghouri			Urdu poet	
Bashir-ud-din Farooqi			former Grand Mufti of Jammu and Kashmir.	
Syed Babar Ashraf			former General Secretary, All India Ulema and Mashaikh Board and member	
Fateh Muhammad Sial			Ahmediyaa missionary	

== Academics ==
Name	Class year	Degree	Notability	Ref.
Moonis Raza			Vice Chancellor of Delhi University, Founder chairman and Rector of Jawaharlal Nehru University	
Masud Choudhary			Founder- Vice Chancellor of Baba Ghulam Shah Badshah University	
Mijanur Rahman			Vice Chancellor of Jagannath University, Dhaka, Bangladesh	
Abdul Aleem				
Javed Musarrat				
Masud Husain Khan			5th Vice-Chancellor of Jamia Millia Islamia; father of Urdu-linguistics	
Faizan Mustafa			Vice Chancellor of Nalsar University of Law	
Abdulaziz Sachedina			professor and Islamic scholar	
Yasin Mazhar Siddiqi		MA; MPhil; PhD	Former director of the Institute of Islamic Studies of Aligarh Muslim University	
Talat Ahmad		MSc	professor of geology and Vice Chancellor of Jamia Millia Islamia	
Abu Bakr Ahmad Haleem			political scientist and first Vice Chancellor of Karachi University	
Akhtarul Wasey			academician and Padma Shri recipient	
K M Baharul Islam	1992	MA English	Director, Institute of Management Technology Hyderabad, India.	
Kafeel Ahmad Qasmi	1986	PhD	Former chairman of the department of Arabic and former dean of the faculty of arts, AMU	
Shad Saleem Faruqi		LLB; LLM	Professor of Law in the University of Malaya	
Syed Anwarul Haq Haqqi		MA; PhD		
Obaid Siddiqi		MSc		
Ahmad Salahuddin	1962	PhD	Founder Director Interdisciplinary Biotechnology Institute AMU	
Shamim Jairajpuri		Ph.D	Former Vice Chancellor Maulana Azad National Urdu University	

== Sports ==
Name	Class year	Degree	Notability	Ref.
Akhtar Hussain			field hockey player	
Annu Raj Singh	2006		sport shooter	
B. P. Govinda			field hockey player	
Dhyan Chand			field hockey player and captain of the Indian men's field hockey team	
Ghaus Mohammad			tennis player	
Jamshed Nasiri			Iranian footballer	
Joginder Singh			field hockey player	
Lala Amarnath			cricketer and captain of the Indian national cricket team	
Majid Bishkar			Iranian footballer	
Syed Mushtaq Ali			cricketer	
Zafar Iqbal			field hockey player and captain of the Indian men's field hockey team	
Syed Ali			field hockey player	
Inam-ur Rahman			field hockey player	
Latif-ur Rehman			field hockey player	
Ahsan Mohomed Khan			field hockey player	
Wazir Ali			cricketer	
Khwaja Saeed Hai			Pakistani tennis player	

== See also ==
- List of Chancellors and Vice-Chancellors of Aligarh Muslim University
