= Akshay Kumar (disambiguation) =

Akshay Kumar (born 1967) is an Indian actor.

Akshay Kumar may also refer to:

- Akshayakumara, a son of Ravana featured in the Sanskrit epic poem Ramayana
- Akshay Kumar (British actor) (born 1994)
- Akshay Kumar Baral (1860–1919), Indian poet and writer in Bengali
- Akshay Kumar Datta (1820–1886), Indian writer in Bengali
- Akshay Kumar Jain (1915–1993), Indian independence activist, writer, journalist; editor of Navbharat Times
- Akshay Kumar Maitreya (1861–1930), Indian historian and social worker
- Akshay Kumar Sen (1854–1923), disciple of Sri Ramakrishna
