= Furqan Qamar =

Indian education administrator

Vice-Chancellor of Integral University, Lucknow
- Incumbent
- Assumed office 06 March 2026
- Preceded by: Javed Musarrat

Secretary General, Association of Indian Universities
- In office 26 June 2014 – 25 June 2019
- Preceded by: Prof. D. S. Chauhan
- Succeeded by: Dr. (Mrs) Pankaj Mittal

Vice-Chancellor of Central University of Himachal Pradesh
- In office 20 January 2010 – 25 June 2014
- Preceded by: Position established
- Succeeded by: Kuldip Chand Agnihotri

Vice-Chancellor of University of Rajasthan
- In office 24 September 2009 – 20 January 2010
- Preceded by: Dr. N. K. Jain
- Succeeded by: Prof. B. L. Sharma

Adviser (Education), Planning Commission, Government of India
- In office 5 March 2008 – 23 September 2009

Professor, Centre for Management Studies, Jamia Millia Islamia
- In office July 1984 – December 2024

Personal details
- Born: 1 January 1960 (age 66) Bahariabad, Ghazipur, Uttar Pradesh, India
- Citizenship: Indian
- Education: University of Lucknow
- Occupation: Professor, Educationalist, Academic

Furqan Qamar is a vice-chancellor of Integral University and former vice-chancellor of University of Rajasthan and first vice-chancellor of Central University of Himachal Pradesh. Earlier he was associated with Association of Indian Universities. Professor Furqan Qamar, was the secretary general of the Association of Indian Universities, i.e. the principal executive officer of the largest and one of the oldest network of universities. He has also served as advisor (education) in the Planning Commission of India.

Essentially a professor of management, he has keen research interest in public policy, planning, administration and financing of higher education and has numerous publications in journals of repute to his credit. Professor Qamar has chaired and been members of a large number of committees, working groups at the national and international level.

Furqan Qamar is serving as Professor in CMS (Center for Management Studies).He has published 35 research papers and several Articles in National news papers Jamia Millia Islamia.

== Education and qualifications ==
- Qamar was awarded PhD on dissertation entitled "Financial Management in residential University of UP" University of Lucknow in 1989.
- M.Com in 1981, from University of Lucknow, securing first position.
- B.Com in 1979, Lucknow Christian Degree College, Lucknow University securing first position.

== Positions held ==
- Secretary General, Association of Indian Universities, since June 26, 2014 till 25 June 2019.
- Former First Vice-Chancellor of Central University of Himachal Pradesh from January 20, 2010 to June 25, 2014
- Former vice-chancellor of University of Rajisthan, Jaipur from September 24, 2009 to January 20, 2010.
- Adviser (Education), Planning Commission, Government of India, from March 5, 2008 to September 23, 2009.

=== Other administrative posts ===
- Coordinator, Jamia Medical college Project since July 22, 2019
- Former director, Centre for Management Studies, Jamia Millia Islamia.
- Coordinator, International Relations, Jamia Millia Islamia, New Delhi.
- Coordinator, Development cell, Jamia Millia Islamia, New Delhi.
- Former Provost, Boys Hall of Residence, Jamia Millia Islamia, New Delhi.
- Former member secretary, Academic and Administrative Audit committee of Jamia Millia Islamia (from the years 1999–2000, 2000–2001).

== Selected awards ==
- D.Lit. (honoris causa), Swami Vivekananda Subharti University, Meerut.
- Rajrishi Purushottam Das Tandon Shiksha Samman by the Uttar Pradesh Rajarshi Tandon Open University.
- Visionary EduLeader Of India, rethink India Foundation, conferred by Shri Pranab Mukherjee, former president of India.
- Honorary professorship in educational administrator, Avinashlingam Deemed University, Coimbatore
- Lifetime Achievement Award by the Punjab commerce and Management Association.

== Publications ==
Dr. Qamar has published several research reports, research papers and booklets/monographs his few publications are :

- Financial Control in Indian Universities, Anamika Publishers, New Delhi.
- Schedule Castes: Their socio-economic status and development aspirations, Inter India Publications, New Delhi.

== See also ==
- Jamia Millia Islamia, New Delhi
- Central University of Himachal Pradesh
- Association of Indian Universities
