= Kuldip Chand Agnihotri =

Indian academic

Kuldeep Chand Agnihotri
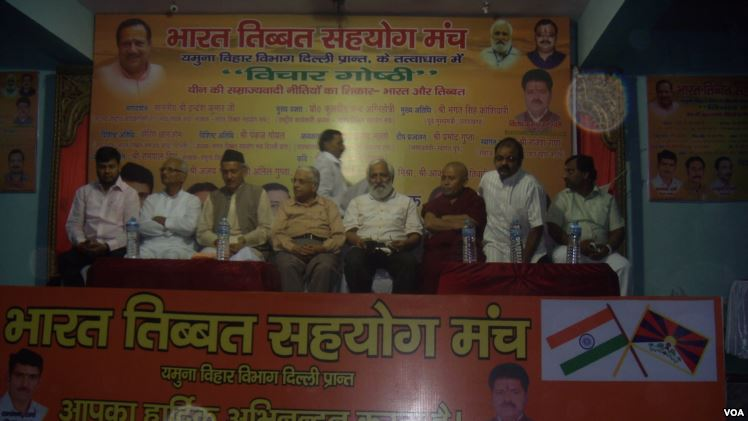
- Prof. Kuldeep Chand Agnihotri

Vice Chancellor of Central University of Himachal Pradesh
- In office 20 April 2015 – 25 March 2021
- President: Pranab Mukherjee
- Preceded by: Furqan Qamar
- Succeeded by: S.P. Bansal

Personal details
- Born: 26 May 1951 (age 74)
- Occupation: Professor, Vice-Chancellor
- Profession: Teaching, Administration

Kuldip Chand Agnihotri (born in 1951) was Vice Chancellor of Central University of Himachal Pradesh and served their from 20 April 2015 to 25 March 2021. He is eminent academic and member of various academic bodies.

== Education ==
Agnihotri completed his B.Sc. from Sikh National College. He did his MA from Khalsa College, Layalpur, Jalandhar. He obtained his Ph.D. degree from Punjab University, Chandigarh.

== Books ==
- KUMAR., DR. KULDEEP CHAND AGNIHOTRI; DR. SANJAY (2012). ENCYCLOPAEDIA OF TIBETAN BUDDHISM VOLUME-5 (TIBETAN BUDDHAHOOD AND ITS PRACTICE). ANMOL PUBLICATIONS PVT L. ISBN 978-93-90240-51-7. OCLC 1195712410.
- Agnihotri, Kuladipa Canda (2019). Narendra Modi hone ka artha. Prabhat Prakashan. ISBN 978-93-5322-256-7. OCLC 1099835346.
- Agnihotri, Kuladipa Canda (2018). Jammu-Kasmira ka vismrta adhyaya: Kusoka Bakula Rimpoche. Prabhat Prakashan. ISBN 978-93-5266-901-1. OCLC 1106096241.
- Agnihotri, Kuladipa Canda (2013). Jammu-Kasmira ki anakahi kahani. Dilli: Prabhata Prakasana. ISBN 978-93-5048-452-4. OCLC 864409366.
- AGNIHOTRI, KULDEEP CHAND (2018). JAMMU-KASHMIR KA VISHMRIT ADHYAYA. S.l.: PRABHAT PRAKASHAN. ISBN 978-93-5266-902-8. OCLC 1258218608.
- Agnihotri, Kuladipa Canda (2013). Jammu-kasmira ki anakahi kahani. Prabhat Prakashan. ISBN 978-93-5048-452-4. OCLC 879034376.
- Agnihotri, Kuladipa Canda; Jammu Kashmir Study Centre (2017). Adhunika laddakha ke nirmata kusoka bakula rimpoche. Jammū Kaśmīra Adhyayana Kendra. ISBN 978-81-934808-1-6. OCLC 1037893132.
- Agnihotri, Kuladipa Canda (1980). Guru Gobinda Simha, vyaktitva evam krtitva. Dilli: Atmarama. OCLC 8931859.
- Agnihotri, Kuladipa Canda (1981). Irani kranti aura usake bada. Dilli: Jayasri Prakasana. OCLC 8866135.
- Agnihotri, Kuladipa Canda; Bharata-Tibbata Sahayoga Manca (2006). Sri Guruji aura Tibbata. Nai Dilli: Bharata-Tibbata Sahayoga Manca. OCLC 221957362.
