= Educare India =

EduCARE India
- Formation: 1994
- Type: NGO
- Purpose: Community education and welfare
- Website: http://www.educare.in

EduCARE India stands for 'Education & Community Applied Research Establishment in India', a community development institutional organisation that has been working with local communities and young talented students from higher education institutions / universities such as Panjab University, Chandigarh and Central University of Himachal Pradesh and other international universities to conduct community based education and applied research, organisation of seminars, conferences, exhibitions and an international internship and exchange program along with AIESEC

== Area of work ==
EduCARE India develops new concepts and strategies in the field of localisation of sustainable and regenerative development through community education, applied research and social innovations in India.

The organization’s novel efforts are towards the social action and transformation through capacity building at the local level that involves the integration of socio-political, environmental, governmental, and political domains of sustainable development.

The focus areas of work includes marginalised community empowerment, women's education and empowerment, sustainable social microfinance, rural waste management, renewable energies, organic farming, forestation and wildlife conservation.

== Organisation ==
EduCARE India, is a registered NGO / not-for-profit Trust.

== Project GlobalPEACE ==
Its Project GlobalPEACE (Global Perspectives through Education & Cultural Exchange) engages volunteers from foreign countries for international internship in India through its international internship programme in India and Indian interns from Indian universities to promote peace, global citizenship and global perspectives in Indian students and youth.

== SEHAT SEVA Abhiyan ==
SEHAT SEVA Abhiyaan is an initiative responding to elderly needs by attempting to promote their optimal level of health and well-being and to assist them in remaining home, avoiding frequent doctor visitations, hospitalization, or admission to long-term care institutions, thereby claiming to advance their greater independence, comfort, and dignity of life.

== AapdaPAR ==
Aapda Prepared, Aware and Resilient communities is an initiative of EduCARE India supporting and networking with disaster management authorities to create a disaster prepared, aware and resilient communities through research, disaster planning, education, training and capacity building through developing task force of volunteers.

== BAGEECHA ==
BAGEECHA (Botanical Applied Gardens for Ecological Enhancement and Climate Change Adaptation) / Plastic Free Temples / Botanical Gardens was an initiative to encourage farmers and horticulturalists to use part of their land to cultivate flowers, and to replace plastic flowers in temples with real flowers.
