= Deeba (name) =

Deeba and Deebah is a female given name. Notable people with the name include:

- Deeba (born 1947), Pakistani film actress
- Deeba Salim Irfan (born 1969), Indian-Muslim writer
- Deebah Sherazi (born 1980), Pakistani former cricketer
