= R. Sowdhamini =

Indian computational biologist, bioinformatician and professor

- Born: 24 May 1964 (age 62); Tamil Nadu, India
- Education: IIT Madras; Indian Institute of Science; Birkbeck, University of London; University of Cambridge
- Known for: Computational studies on Protein Science
- Awards: 2007 N-BIOS Prize; 2010 HFSP Award; IIFS Bharat Jyoti Award
- Scientific career
- Fields: Protein Science; Genome sequencing
- Workplaces: National Centre for Biological Sciences; inStem
- Doctoral advisor: Tom Blundell

Ramanathan Sowdhamini (born 24 May 1964) is an Indian computational biologist, bioinformatician. She is a professor at the department of biochemistry, biophysics and bioinformatics of the National Centre for Biological Sciences, a TIFR research facility located in Bengaluru. Known for computational studies in the field of Protein Science, Sowdhamini is also associated with the Institute for Stem Cell Biology and Regenerative Medicine as a collaborator and is an elected fellow of the Indian Academy of Sciences as well as the Indian National Science Academy. The Department of Biotechnology of the Government of India awarded her the National Bioscience Award for Career Development, one of the highest Indian science awards, for her contributions to biosciences in 2007.

== Biography ==
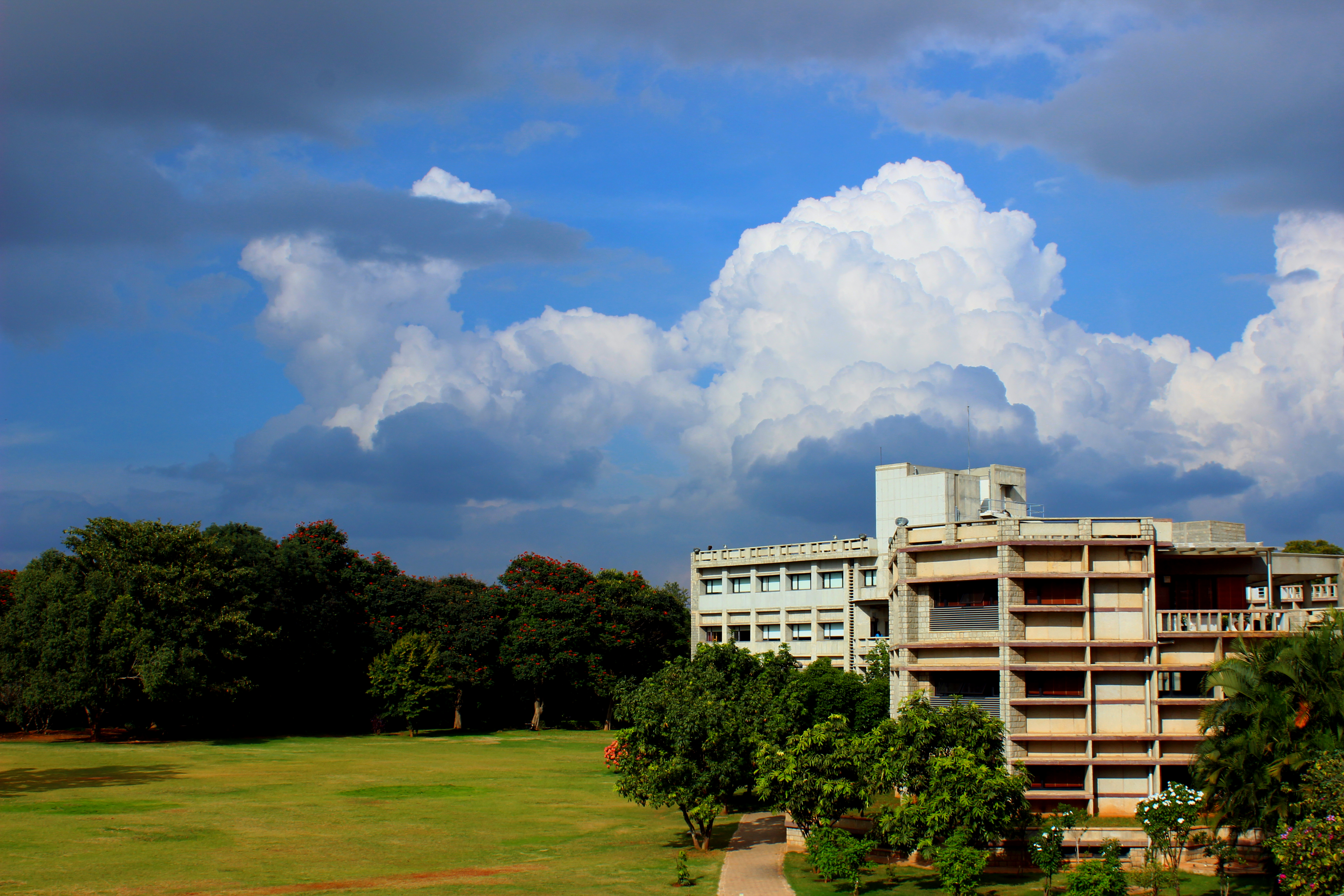
NCBS Campus

Born on 24 May 1964 in the south Indian state of Tamil Nadu, Sowdhamini earned a post graduate degree from the Indian Institute of Technology, Madras in basic chemistry and enrolled at the Indian Institute of Science for her doctoral studies from where she secured a PhD. Subsequently, she did her post-doctoral work in the UK, first at Birkbeck, University of London (Note: Under the guidance of Tom Blundell, a Knight Bachelor) and later, at the University of Cambridge. On her return to India, she joined the National Centre for Biological Sciences (NCBS), a research facility in Bengaluru, jointly funded by the Tata Institute of Fundamental Research and the Department of Atomic Energy as a member of faculty where she serves as a professor at the department of biochemistry, biophysics and bioinformatics. She also serves as a collaborator at the Centre for Cardiovascular Biology and Disease of the Institute for Stem Cell Biology and Regenerative Medicine (inStem) of the Department of Biotechnology.

== Legacy ==
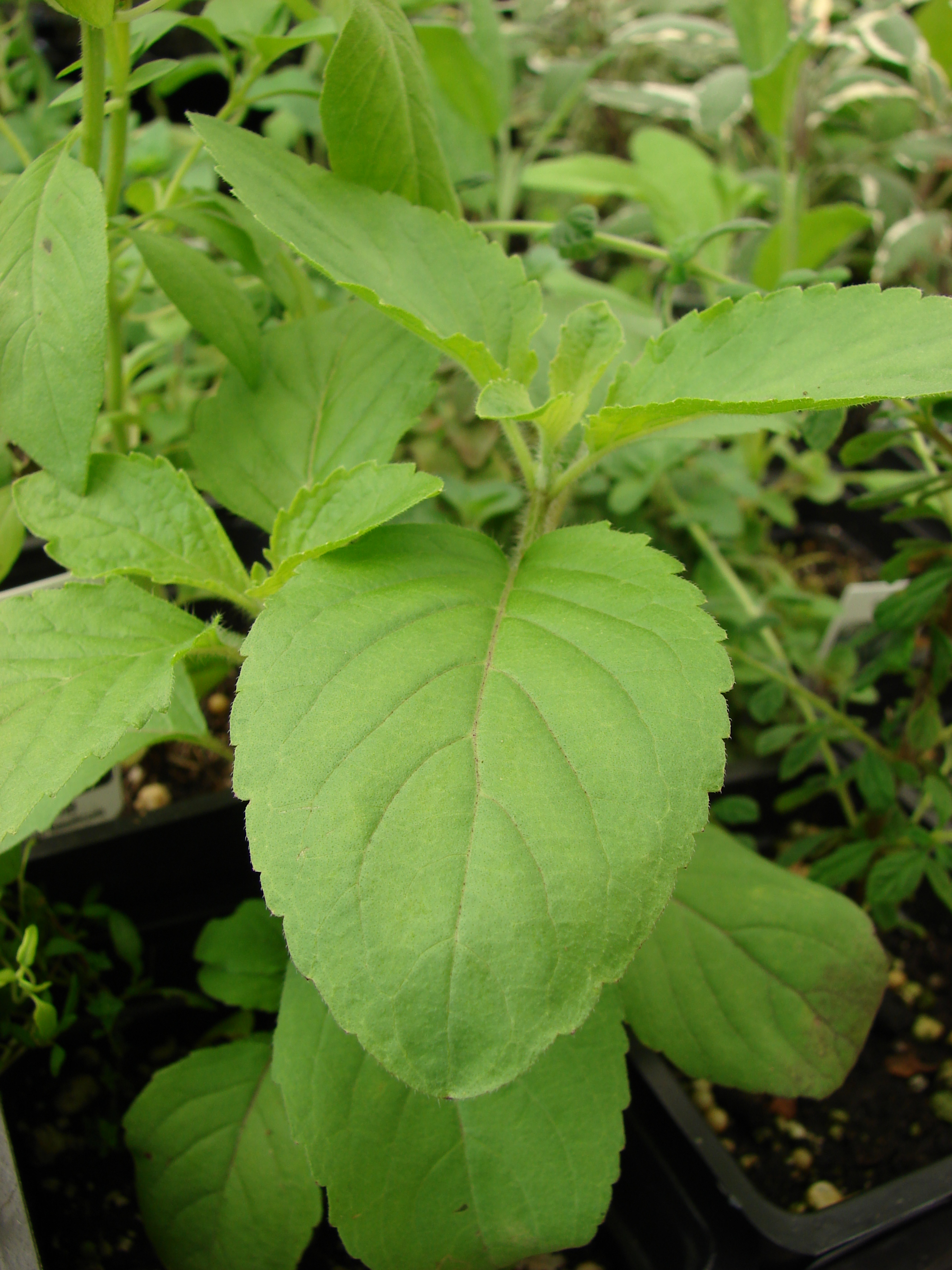
Tulsi plant

Sowdhamini's research is in the fields of computational studies of Protein Science as well as genome sequencing and she is reported to have done advanced research in the code development for studying Protein folding and unfolding. She leads a group of scientists engaged in the computational studies of proteins with regard to their random rearrangements during evolution and they have carried out genome surveys of several protein families and superfamilies. Her team was successful in preparing the draft genome of Ocimum tenuiflorum (commonly known as Tulsi), a plant with medicinal properties, for the first time which assisted in identifying the genes responsible for the production of Ursolic acid, a triterpenoid and Eugenol, a phenylpropanoid, compounds responsible for the medicinal properties of the plant. She was the lead developer of 3DSwap, a database of 3D domain-swapped proteins. Besides, along with James Spudich of the Stanford University and Henrik Flyvbjerg of the Technical University of Denmark, she led the project for studying coiled coil interactions in proteins, a collaborative project of the two institutions and the National Centre for Biological Sciences. Her studies have been documented by way of a number of articles (Note: Please see Selected bibliography section) and ResearchGate, an online repository of scientific articles has listed 427 of them. She sits in the editorial board of Bioinformation journal and has also mentored many post-graduate, doctoral ad post-doctoral scholars in their research.

== Awards and honours ==
The Department of Biotechnology of the Government of India awarded Sowdhamini the National Bioscience Award for Career Development, one of the highest Indian science awards in 2007. She was elected as a fellow by the Indian Academy of Sciences in 2010 and she received the Human Frontier Science Program Award the same year. A year later, The Indian National Science Academy elected her as a fellow in 2011. She is also a recipient of the Bharat Jyoti Award of the India International Friendship Society. She is a J. C. Bose National Fellow of the Department of Science and Technology since 2016.

== Selected bibliography ==
- Madan, Lalima L.; Veeranna, S.; Shameer, Khader; Reddy, Chilamakuri C. S.; Sowdhamini, R.; Gopal, B. (13 September 2011). "Modulation of Catalytic Activity in Multi-Domain Protein Tyrosine Phosphatases". PLOS ONE. 6 (9) e24766. Bibcode:2011PLoSO...624766M. doi:10.1371/journal.pone.0024766. ISSN 1932-6203. PMC 3172300. PMID 21931847.
- Syamaladevi, Divya P.; Sowdhamini, R. (26 September 2011). "Evolutionary traces decode molecular mechanism behind fast pace of myosin XI". BMC Structural Biology. 11: 35. doi:10.1186/1472-6807-11-35. ISSN 1472-6807. PMC 3209465. PMID 21942950.
- Kumar, Jitendra; Choudhary, Bikash C.; Metpally, Raghu; Zheng, Qun; Nonet, Michael L.; Ramanathan, Sowdhamini; Klopfenstein, Dieter R.; Koushika, Sandhya P. (4 November 2010). "The Caenorhabditis elegans Kinesin-3 Motor UNC-104/KIF1A Is Degraded upon Loss of Specific Binding to Cargo". PLOS Genetics. 6 (11) e1001200. doi:10.1371/journal.pgen.1001200. ISSN 1553-7404. PMC 2973836. PMID 21079789.

== See also ==
- Computational chemistry
- Protein tyrosine phosphatase
