= Owais Mohammad =

Indian immunologist and nanotechnologist

- Born: India
- Known for: Studies on nanotechnology-based vaccine and drug delivery
- Awards: 2007 N-BIOS Prize; IIFS Rashtriya Gaurav Award; VIFRA Distinguished Scientist Award-2015
- Scientific career
- Fields: Immunology; Nanotechnology
- Workplaces: Aligarh Muslim University

Owais Mohammad is an Indian immunologist, nano-technologist and a professor at the interdisciplinary biotechnology unit of the Aligarh Muslim University. Known for his studies on nanotechnology-based vaccine and drug delivery, Owais is the author of two books, Trypanothione reductase: a potential anti-leishmanial drug target and Antimicrobial properties of clove oil: clove oils as antimicrobial agent. He has also co-edited two books, Modern Phytomedicine: Turning Medicinal Plants into Drugs and Combating Fungal Infections: Problems and Remedy, and has contributed chapters. His studies have also been documented by way of a number of articles (Note: Please see Selected bibliography section) and ResearchGate, an online repository of scientific articles has listed 60 of them. He is a recipient of the Rashtriya Gaurav Award of the India International Friendship Society. The Department of Biotechnology of the Government of India awarded him the National Bioscience Award for Career Development, one of the highest Indian science awards, for his contributions to biosciences in 2007. His work has been displayed on cover pages of FEMS Immunol. Med Microbiology for all the issues of Year 2006 and Molecular Medicine in May–June issue of Year 2007.

== Education and career ==
Owais did his undergraduate and post-graduate studies in Pharmacy from Delhi University, India, after which he pursued his doctoral research from Institute of Microbial Technology (IMTECH), one of premier biotechnology institutes in India and Panjab University, Chandigarh, under the mentorship of Prof. C. M. Gupta. Later, he joined National Cancer Institute, National Institutes of Health, Bethesda, USA as Fogarty Post Doctoral Fellow, where he worked on HIV. During his stay at NIH, he demonstrated that the introduction of HIV-1 genome into PBMCs blocks the propagation of HIV-2 viruses. His work on the antiviral chemokine, RANTES established that the amino-terminal domain of the chemokine was not essential for its antiviral activity or for its binding to the CCR5 receptor. He is currently serving as a professor of biotechnology at Interdisciplinary Biotechnology Unit, Aligarh Muslim University, Aligarh, working in the area of drug delivery since his joining in 1998.

== Research ==
Besides active involvement in teaching modern biochemistry/biotechnology courses to M.Sc./Ph.D students, Owais has successfully established a small but active research group with focus on nanoparticle-based novel delivery systems including dendrimers/virosomes for gene packaging and liposomes, niosomes, microspheres and solid core lipid nano-particles for vaccine delivery, gene delivery, targeted drug delivery etc.; with a view to increase the efficacy and safety of encapsulated chemotherapeutic agents/subunit vaccines for some important infectious diseases.

The research focus of Dr. Owais's group has been on:

- Nanoparticles based antigen/DNA vaccine against various infectious diseases with special converges on intracellular pathogens.
- Novel nano-carriers for targeted delivery of encapsulated therapeutic agents (siRNA/drug of interest) for improved treatment of cancer and some imperative infectious diseases.
- Nanoparticles with assorted applications in the field of diagnostics, taste/odor masking and treatment of hyperbilirubinemia in model animals.

=== Nano-carrier based vaccines: prophylactic measures against infectious diseases ===
Reckoning with the limitations of conventional vaccine, the main focus of Dr. Owais's research endeavors has been to develop nano-vaccines against various infectious diseases of bacterial (tuberculosis, salmonellosis, listeriosis and brucellosis), protozoan (malaria, leishmaniasis) and fungal (candidasis and cryoptococcosis) origin.

In general, specialized groups of pathogens adapt intra-cellular parasitism as a strategy to avoid antibody onslaught. Keeping into consideration the non-effectiveness of humoral immune response against such intracellular pathogens, Dr. Owais evaluated potential of fusogenic lipid based vaccines as an alternative prophylactic strategy. In this regard, he has compared lipid compositions of plasma membranes of both prokaryotic as well as eukaryotic cells. These studies established a correlation between the lipid compositions of plasma membranes of living organisms with evolutionary trend. Lipid isolated from lower organisms possesses strong fusogenic potential. He established that model antigens entrapped in liposomes made up of fusogenic lipids, can be delivered to the target cells including antigen-presenting cells, resulting in both the endo/lysosomal and cytosolic degradation pathways for antigen processing. The dual processing of antigens in the antigen presenting cells activated both the CD4+ T helper as well as CD8+ cytotoxic T cells. Further, he established that immunization with fusogenic liposomes resulted in expression of both IL-2 and IFN-γ, the two key cytokines that eventually help in protection against intracellular infections.

Keeping in view that sperm-ova fusion during zygote formation is generally facilitated by specific lipid compositions of the two cell populations, he demonstrated the fusogenic attributes of sperm plasma membrane lipids, and established the prophylactic potential of spermatosome based vaccines against various intracellular pathogens. As conventional egg phosphatidylcholine based liposomes are of limited application in activation of pathogen specific CTL response required for inhibiting intracellular pathogens, he developed non-phosphatidylcholine liposome as vehicle for delivery of antigens in prophylactic treatment of experimental leishmaniasis. Further, the liposome/niosome based vaccines were also found to be effective against malaria parasite. In addition, he has prepared archaeal lipid based liposomes and demonstrated their immunoadjuvant potential in model animals. Of note, the archaeosome based vaccine were used to mount long lasting memory response against experimental listeriosis.

Further, Dr. Owais has highlighted interactions between two mycobacterial proteins viz. Rv3619 (RD9 family) and Rv3620 (CFP-10 analog). He demonstrated that Rv3619 protein disrupted the biomembrane and also evoked a strong immunological response. Moreover, it was revealed that nanoparticle mediated targeting of RD9 gene products to dendritic cells favors Th1 prototype of CD4+ T lymphocytes. He had successfully expressed L7/L12 ribosomal protein, SOD-IL-18 fusion protein of Brucella spp. and trypanothione reductase of Leishmania donavani. The recombinant proteins were used as potent subunit vaccines in protection studies. Liposome-based DNA vaccine developed by Dr. Owais has shown remarkable promise against experimental murine brucellosis.

Besides introducing liposome, niosome and microsphere based novel particulate vaccines; Dr. Owais has recently employed an autologous plasma bead based dual antigen delivery system as a prophylactic strategy against intracellular infections. The liposome/microsphere entrapped antigen further co-entrapped in dual core fibrin beads based vaccine was shown to eliminate intracellular pathogens from systemic circulation.

=== Targeted nano-delivery system ===
Liposomes have been widely considered useful as drug/enzyme/nucleic acid vehicles in therapy. However, their successful application was limited by their rapid lysis in blood, major uptake by the RES, and lack of availability of simple procedures for specific targeted delivery. The main emphasis of Dr. Owais has been therefore on addressing some of the problems associated with the liposomes as drug delivery systems. He demonstrated that covalent attachment of anti-erythrocyte F(ab')_{2} to the liposomes surface enables the liposomes to specifically recognize the erythrocytes in vivo and deliver their contents to these cells. It was further demonstrated that the entrapment of anti-malarial drugs like chloroquine (chq), in the antibody-coated liposomes increases the drug efficacy not only against the chq-sensitive but also against the chq-resistant malarial infections. Encouraged by these results, the liposomes were coated with F(ab')_{2} fragments of a monoclonal antibody which specifically recognized the malaria-infected erythrocytes (Patent No. 182550). The monoclonal antibody bearing liposomes with encapsulated chq were found to be highly effective in the treatment of chq-resistant experimental malaria.

== Awards and honors ==
He was awarded the Young Scientist Award (MYSA) in Life Sciences in 2002. Aligarh Muslim University bestowed him with Outstanding University Researcher Award in 2008 and again with the Best Teacher Award in 2009. The Department of Biotechnology (DBT) of the Government of India awarded him the National Bioscience Award for Career Development, one of the highest Indian science awards in 2007. In 2013, he received the TATA Innovation Award by DBT, Govt. of India and IIFS-Rashtriya Gaurav Award. Other notable awards include VIFRA Distinguished Research Scientist Award-2015 and Indus Research Excellence Award-2015.

Owais is a member of editorial boards of several international journals including the Open Vaccine Journal (Bentham Press), BioMed Research International (Hindawi Publishing Group), Journal of Clinical Medicine Research (Academic Press), Journal of Chinese Clinical Medicine, Biomedical Research, World Journal of Critical Infectious Diseases (BPG Press), World Journal of Experimental medicine (BPG Press).

== Selected bibliography ==
=== Books ===
- Ahmad, Iqbal; Aqil, Farrukh; Owais, Mohammad (2007). Modern Phytomedicine: Turning Medicinal Plants into Drugs. Wiley-VCH. p. 404. ISBN 978-3-527-31530-7.
- Owais, Mohammad (2009). Trypanothione reductase: a potential anti-leishmanial drug target: Recent trend of development of drug resistant field isolates and usage of alternate strategy for treatment of leishmaniasis. VDM Verlag Dr. Müller. p. 144. ISBN 978-3-639-21244-0.
- Ahmad, Iqbal; Owais, Mohammad; Shahid, Mohammed; Aqil, Farrukh (2010). Combating Fungal Infections: Problems and Remedy. Springer. p. 539. ISBN 978-3-642-44672-6.
- Anis Ahmad, Mohammad Owais, Shailender Singh Gaurav (2013). Antimicrobial properties of clove oil: clove oils as antimicrobial agent. LAP LAMBERT Academic Publishing. p. 56. ISBN 978-3-659-41578-4.

=== Selected publications ===
- Kaushik S, Iqbal N, Singh N, Sikarwar JS, Singh PK, Sharma P, Kaur P, Sharma S, Owais M, Singh TP. "Search of multiple hot spots on the surface of peptidyl-tRNA hydrolase: structural, binding and antibacterial studies". Biochem J. 2018, 475 (3):547-560. doi: 10.1042/BCJ20170666.
- Ahmad F, Zubair S, Gupta P, Gupta UD, Patel R, Owais M. Evaluation of Aggregated Ag85B Antigen for Its Biophysical Properties, Immunogenicity, and Vaccination Potential in a Murine Model of Tuberculosis Infection. Front Immunol. 2017, 27;8:1608. doi: 10.3389/fimmu.2017.01608. eCollection 2017.
- Dinh T, Zia Q, Zubair S, Stapleton P, Singh R, Owais M, Somavarapu S. Novel biodegradable poly(gamma-glutamic acid)-amphotericin B complexes show promise as improved amphotericin B formulations. Nanomedicine. 2017, 13(5):1773-1783. doi: 10.1016/j.nano.2017.02.003.
- Zia Q, Mohammad O, Rauf MA, Khan W, Zubair S. Biomimetically engineered Amphotericin B nano-aggregates circumvent toxicity constraints and treat systemic fungal infection in experimental animals. Sci Rep. 2017, 19;7(1):11873. doi: 10.1038/s41598-017-11847-0.
- Mohammad O, Kaur J, Singh G, Faisal SM, Azhar A, Rauf MA, Gupta UD, Gupta P, Pal R, Zubair S. TLR Agonist Augments Prophylactic Potential of Acid Inducible Antigen Rv3203 against Mycobacterium tuberculosis H37Rv in Experimental Animals. PLOS One. 2016, 29;11(3):e0152240. doi: 10.1371/journal.pone.0152240.
- Tufail S, Owais M, Kazmi S, Balyan R, Khalsa JK, Faisal SM, Sherwani MA, Gatoo MA, Umar MS, Zubair S. Amyloid form of ovalbumin evokes native antigen-specific immune response in the host: prospective immuno-prophylactic potential. J Biol Chem. 2015,13;290(7):4131-48. doi: 10.1074/jbc.M113.540989.
- Zia Q, Khan AA, Swaleha Z, Owais M. Self-assembled amphotericin B-loaded polyglutamic acid nanoparticles: preparation, characterization and in vitro potential against Candida albicans. Int J Nanomed. 2015, 5;10:1769-90. doi: 10.2147/IJN.S31565.
- Alam M, Zubair S, Farazuddin M, Ahmad E, Khan A, Zia Q, Malik A, Mohammad O. Development, characterization and efficacy of niosomal diallyl disulfide in treatment of disseminated murine candidiasis. Nanomedicine. 2013, 9(2):247-56. doi: 10.1016/j.nano.2012.07.004.
- Tufail S, Badrealam KF, Sherwani A, Gupta UD, Owais M. Tissue specific heterogeneity in effector immune cell response. Front Immunol. 2013, 27;4:254. doi: 10.3389/fimmu.2013.00254.

Nanomedicine

- Khan, Azmat Ali; Jabeen, Mumtaz; Khan, Aijaz Ahmed; Owais, Mohammad (August 2013). "Anticancer Efficacy of A Novel Propofol–Linoleic Acid-Loaded Escheriosomal Formulation Against Murine Hepatocellular Carcinoma". Nanomedicine. 8 (8): 1281–1294. doi:10.2217/nnm.12.166. ISSN 1743-5889. PMID 23311988.
- Alam, Maroof; Dwivedi, Varun; Khan, Aijaz Ahmed; Mohammad, Owais (October 2009). "Efficacy of Niosomal Formulation of Diallyl Sulfide Against Experimental Candidiasis in Swiss Albino Mice". Nanomedicine. 4 (7): 713–724. doi:10.2217/nnm.09.60. ISSN 1743-5889. PMID 19839808.
- Chauhan, Arun; Zubair, Swaleha; Nadeem, Ahmad; Ansari, Sajid Ali; Ansari, Mohammad Yunus; Mohammad, Owais (March 2014). "Escheriosome-Mediated Cytosolic Delivery of PLK1-Specific siRNA: Potential in Treatment of Liver Cancer in BALB/c Mice". Nanomedicine. 9 (4): 407–420. doi:10.2217/nnm.13.21. ISSN 1743-5889. PMID 24910873.

J Antimicrob Chemother

- Khan MA, Owais M. Toxicity, stability and pharmacokinetics of amphotericin B in immunomodulator tuftsin-bearing liposomes in a murine model. J Antimicrob Chemother. 2006, 58(1):125-32.
- Khan MA, Jabeen R, Nasti TH, Mohammad O. Enhanced anticryptococcal activity of chloroquine in phosphatidylserine-containing liposomes in a murine model. J Antimicrob Chemother. 2005, 55(2):223-8.
- Nasti TH, Khan MA, Owais M. Enhanced efficacy of pH-sensitive nystatin liposomes against Cryptococcus neoformans in murine model. J Antimicrob Chemother. 2006, 57(2):349-52.
- Khan MA, Nasti TH, Owais M. Incorporation of amphotericin B in tuftsin-bearing liposomes showed enhanced efficacy against systemic cryptococcosis in leucopenic mice. J Antimicrob Chemother. 2005, 56(4):726-31.

Biochim Biophys Acta

- Ahmad N, Arif K, Faisal SM, Neyaz MK, Tayyab S, Owais M. PLGA-microsphere mediated clearance of bilirubin in temporarily hyperbilirubinemic rats: an alternate strategy for the treatment of experimental jaundice. Biochim Biophys Acta. 2006, 1760(2):227-32.
- Deeba F, Tahseen HN, Sharad KS, Ahmad N, Akhtar S, Saleemuddin M, Mohammad O. Phospholipid diversity: Correlation with membrane–membrane fusion events. Biochim Biophys Acta. 2005 May 20;1669(2):170-81.
- Younus H, Owais M, Rao DN, Saleemuddin M. Stabilization of pancreatic ribonuclease A by immobilization on Sepharose-linked antibodies that recognize the labile region of the enzyme. Biochim Biophys Acta. 2001, 9;1548(1):114-20.

Vaccine

- Ahmad E, Fatima MT, Saleemuddin M, Owais M. Plasma beads loaded with Candida albicans cytosolic proteins impart protection against the fungal infection in BALB/c mice. Vaccine. 2012, 6;30(48):6851-8. doi: 10.1016/j.vaccine.2012.09.010.
- Ansari, Mairaj Ahmed; Zubair, Swaleha; Mahmood, Anjum; Gupta, Pushpa; Khan, Aijaz A.; Gupta, Umesh D.; Arora, Ashish; Owais, Mohammad (11 August 2011). Tailleux, Ludovic (ed.). "RD Antigen Based Nanovaccine Imparts Long Term Protection by Inducing Memory Response against Experimental Murine Tuberculosis". PLOS ONE. 6 (8) e22889. Bibcode:2011PLoSO...622889A. doi:10.1371/journal.pone.0022889. ISSN 1932-6203. PMC 3154911. PMID 21853054.
- Singha H, Mallick AI, Jana C, Fatima N, Owais M, Chaudhuri P. Co-immunization with interlukin-18 enhances the protective efficacy of liposomes encapsulated recombinant Cu-Zn superoxide dismutase protein against Brucella abortus. Vaccine. 2011, 24;29(29-30):4720-7. doi: 10.1016/j.vaccine.2011.04.088.
- Mallick, A.I.; Singha, H.; Chaudhuri, P.; Nadeem, Ahmad; Khan, Shadab Ahmad; Dar, Khurshid Ahmad; Owais, M. (May 2007). "Liposomised recombinant ribosomal L7/L12 protein protects BALB/c mice against Brucella abortus 544 infection". Vaccine. 25 (18): 3692–3704. doi:10.1016/j.vaccine.2007.01.066. PMID 17296251.
- Sharma SK, Farah D, Misra-Bhattacharya S, Bajpai P, Agarwal A, Mohammad O. Escheriosome entrapped soluble blood stage antigens impart protective immunity against a multi-drug resistant isolate of Plasmodium yoelii nigeriensis in BALB/c mice. Vaccine. 2006, 13;24(7):948-56. doi: 10.1016/j.vaccine.2012.09.010.
- Owais, Mohammad; Chauhan, Arun; Tufail; Sherwani; Sajid, Mohammad; Suri, C Raman; Owais, Mohammed (October 2011). "Fungus-mediated biological synthesis of gold nanoparticles: potential in detection of liver cancer". International Journal of Nanomedicine. 6: 2305–2319. doi:10.2147/IJN.S23195. ISSN 1178-2013. PMC 3205127. PMID 22072868.

Int J Nanomed

- Farazuddin M, Dua B, Zia Q, Khan AA, Joshi B, Owais M. Chemotherapeutic potential of curcumin-bearing microcells against hepatocellular carcinoma in model animals. Int J Nanomed. 2014, 3;9:1139-52. doi: 10.2147/IJN.S34668.
- Ansari MA, Zubair S, Tufail S, Ahmad E, Khan MR, Quadri Z, Owais M. Ether lipid vesicle-based antigens impart protection against experimental listeriosis. Int J Nanomed. 2012;7:2433-47. doi: 10.2147/IJN.S25875.
- Farazuddin M, Sharma B, Khan AA, Joshi B, Owais M. Anticancer efficacy of perillyl alcohol-bearing PLGA microparticles. Int J Nanomed. 2012;7:35-47. doi: 10.2147/IJN.S24920.
- Chauhan A, Zubair S, Tufail S, Sherwani A, Sajid M, Raman SC, Azam A, Owais M. Fungus-mediated biological synthesis of gold nanoparticles: potential in detection of liver cancer. Int J Nanomed. 2011;6:2305-19. doi: 10.2147/IJN.S23195.

PLOS One

- Owais M, Kazmi S, Tufail S, Zubair S. An alternative chemical redox method for the production of bispecific antibodies: implication in rapid detection of food borne pathogens. PLOS One. 2014 Mar 17;9(3):e91255. doi: 10.1371/journal.pone.0091255.
- Chauhan A, Zubair S, Sherwani A, Owais M. Aloe vera induced biomimetic assemblage of nucleobase into nanosized particles. PLOS One. 2012;7(3):e32049. doi: 10.1371/journal.pone.0032049.
- Ansari MA, Zubair S, Mahmood A, Gupta P, Khan AA, Gupta UD, Arora A, Owais M. RD antigen based nanovaccine imparts long term protection by inducing memory response against experimental murine tuberculosis. PLOS One. 2011;6(8):e22889. doi: 10.1371/journal.pone.0022889.

== See also ==
- Leishmania donovani
- Escherichia coli
