= Harmohinder Singh Bedi =

Indian academic administrator

Harmohinder Singh Bedi (born 12 March 1950) is an Indian academic, academic administrator and author. Since 4 July 2018, he has been serving as the Chancellor of the Central University of Himachal Pradesh.

Before joining Central University of Himachal Pradesh, Bedi had served as Professor Emeritus at Punjabi University, Patiala and as Professor and Head of Department of Hindi, Guru Nanak Dev University, Amritsar.

In 2022, Govt of India conferred Bedi the Padma Shri award, the third highest civilian award of India, for his distinguished service in the field of literature and education. The award is in recognition of his service as a "Punjabi Hindi Author and Academician with over 30 books to his credit".

== Awards ==
- "Hindi Sevi Samman": Honored by the president of India on behalf of Hindi Sahitya Academy for contribution to Hindi Literature (2015)
- National Award of Poetry Book "GarmLoha" from Govt. of India
- Shiromani Hindi Sahitkar Award by Punjab Govt (2004)
- Himoutkrash Award, Himachal Pradesh (2006)
- National Hindi Sewa Purskar (2005)
- "Kavi Ratan" Uppadhi by U P Shitya Academy (1987)
- Punjab Sahitya and Kala Award (1999)
- Punjab Sahitya a Academi Award (2003)
