= S.P. Bansal =

Indian education administrator

Sat Prakash Bansal

Vice Chancellor of Central University of Himachal Pradesh
- Incumbent
- Assumed office 28 July 2021
- Preceded by: Kuldip Chand Agnihotri

Vice Chancellor of Himachal Pradesh Technical University
- In office 12 June 2018 – 25 July 2021
- Preceded by: R L Sharma
- Succeeded by: Shashi Kumar Dhiman

Vice chancellor of Indira Gandhi University, Rewari
- In office 22 April 2016 – 8 June 2018
- Preceded by: Mohinder Kumar
- Succeeded by: SK Gakhar

Vice Chancellor of Maharaja Agrasen University
- In office 1 September 2012 – 20 April 2016
- Preceded by: Position Established
- Succeeded by: Rakesh Kumar Gupta

Professor, Institute of Vocational Studies at Himachal Pradesh University
- In office 1992–2030

Personal details
- Born: 19 December 1965 (age 60)
- Education: M.Com., M.Phil, Ph.D., DCO, SCHE (Switzerland)
- Occupation: Professor, Vice-Chancellor
- Profession: teaching, administration

Sat Prakash Bansal (born 19 December 1965) is an Indian Professor at Himachal Pradesh University who is currently the Vice-Chancellor of Central University of Himachal Pradesh .

Previously, he served as the Vice Chancellor of Himachal Pradesh University (additional charge), Himachal Pradesh Technical University, Indira Gandhi University, Haryana, Bhagat Phool Singh Women's University (additional charge) and Maharaja Agrasen University.
