= India International Friendship Society =

Indian award-granting organisation

The India International Friendship Society (IIFS) is a private voluntary organisation based in New Delhi, India. Its stated aim is to strengthen the ties between India and its expatriate community in the hope of using the resources and potential of the expatriates to benefit India. The organisation's chief activity is the awarding of the Glory of India Award (also called the "Bharat Jyoti Award") in ceremonies held regularly in New Delhi and in international cities with large expatriate Indian communities.

The validity of the awards has been called into question, based on the request for biographical data from award invitees accompanied by a request for the payment of a fee of Rs12,500.

== Awardees ==
Among its awardees, IIFS counts the following prominent people:

- Dev Anand
- Prema Cariappa
- Sunil Dutt
- Shamim Jairajpuri
- Basappa Danappa Jatti
- Rajesh Khanna
- Owais Mohammad
- Prem Chand Pandey
- Kamlesh Patel
- Amichand Rajbansi
- Dhirubhai Shah
- Chaudhary Ishwar Singh
- Marsha Singh
- Ashok Sinha
- R. Sowdhamini
- Nirmal Chandra Suri
- Harinder Takhar
- Mother Teresa
- Pankaj Udhas
- Bharati Vaishampayan
- Drukchen Jigme Pema Wangchen
