= Maulana Azad Education Foundation =

Governmental organization

Maulana Azad Education Foundation is a governmental organization established to promote education amongst educationally backward sections of the Muslim community of India. It is funded by the Ministry of Minority Affairs, Govt. of India. The Minister of Minority Affairs is ex-officio president of the foundation. The foundation was established on the occasion of Maulana Abul Kalam Azad's birth centenary celebrations in 1989.

== Services ==
- Grant-in-aid for non-governmental organizations
- Maulana Azad National Scholarship for meritorious girls' students
- Maulana Azad Memorial Lecture & Awareness Program

== Organisation and structure ==
The governing body of the foundation includes two categories of members:

- Ex-officio members:
1. Dr. Najma A. Heptulla (Hon’ble Minister of Minority Affairs)- President
2. Smt. Preeti Madan (Joint Secretary to the Govt. of India)
3. Prof. Talat Ahmad (Vice-Chancellor, Jamia Millia Islamia)
4. Lt. Gen. Zameeruddin Shah (Vice-Chancellor, Aligarh Muslim University)
5. Prof. (Dr.) Qamar Rahman (Chairman, Education & Women Welfare Committee of the Central Wakf Council)
6. Shri Ali Ahmed Khan Secretary
- Nominated nembers:
1. Prof Tahir Hussain, - Vice President
2. Shri Imran-ur-Rehman Kidwai - Treasurer
3. Shri P. A. Inamdar
4. Shri Mujahid S. Khan
5. Maulana Mohammad Wali Rahmani
6. Shri Akhlaq Ahmed (Former Minister from Bihar)
7. Shri Syed Babar Ashraf
8. Prof. (Dr.) Nahid Zafar Shaikh
9. Shri Syed Shahid Hussain Rizvi

== Shutdown ==
On February 7, the Ministry of Minority Affairs (MoMA) issued an abrupt order to close down the Maulana Azad Education Foundation, without offering any explanation for the decision.
