= Mohammed Ziauddin Ahmed Shakeb =

Indian historian and educator (1933–2021)

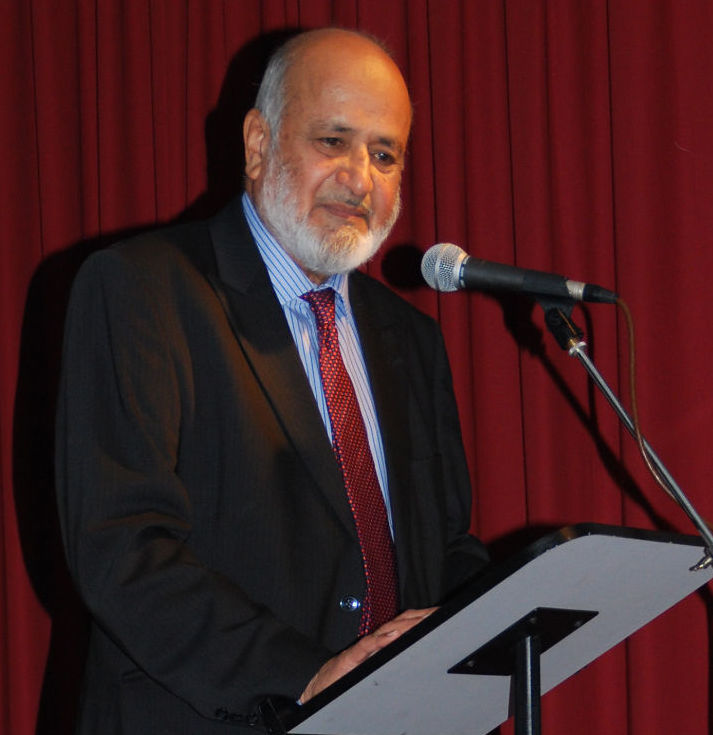
- Born: 21 October 1933
- Died: 20 January 2021 (aged 87); London, England
- Awards: Nawab Faizullah Khan Award

Academic background
- Education: Osmania University, Aligarh Muslim University, Deccan College

Mohammed Ziauddin Ahmed Shakeb (M.Z.A. Shakeb) (21 October 1933 – 20 January 2021) was a historian of the Deccan, art connoisseur, Sufi Intellectual, and Urdu and Persian literary critic.

== Early life and education ==
Born on 21 October 1933, Shakeb grew up in Hyderabad and Aurangabad. He received a BA in Political Science from the Osmania University, and an MA from Aligarh Muslim University in 1956. He completed his doctorate in Relations of Golkonda with Iran from Deccan College in 1976.

== Career ==
Together with Vasanth Kumar Bawa, Shakeb set up the first-ever Hyderabad Urban Development Authority which is now referred to as Hyderabad Metropolitan Development Authority. In 1962, he was appointed an archivist at the State Archives of Andhra Pradesh in Hyderabad. Whilst here he created the Mughal Record Room. His publications include Mughal Archives Vol I: A Descriptive Catalogue of the Documents Pertaining to the Reign of Shah Jahan, in 1977 which remains critical reading for those seeking to learn how to read administrative documents in Indo-Persian. He went on to write many publications for The British Library, State Archives Andhra Pradesh, and other repositories, universities, and auction houses.

From 1980 to 1987, Shakeb taught Indian history and the history of Indo-Islamic art and culture in the Department of Indology at the School of Oriental and African Studies, University of London. He, later on, worked as a consultant for Christie's in their department of Islamic and Indian Art as their leading expert on Persian and Arabic manuscripts for 30 years.

He also continued to work on Indo-Persian manuscripts and Mughal documents and catalogued such manuscripts in the British Library, such as the Batala Collection of Mughal Documents 1527-1757 in 1990. Throughout this time he supervised many doctoral researchers in the fields of Mughal history, Deccan studies and Urdu and Persian literature.

Shakeb was also the Director of Urdu teachers training at Middlesex University up until 1998.

He also played a key role in setting up the Haroon Khan Sherwani Center for Deccan Studies at Maulana Azad National Urdu University and had been a member of the center's first advisory board. He was considered a pioneer, having helped lay the foundations of Deccan Studies.

Shakeb was an authority on various poets from the Indian subcontinent and Persia, writing books and organising and speaking at conferences on Bedil, Amir Khusrau, Iqbal, Ghalib, and Rumi.

== Death ==
Shakeb died in London on 20 January 2021, aged 87. He is survived by his wife, Farhat Ahmed, two daughters, a son, and nine grandchildren.

== Awards and Recognitions ==
- Nawab Faizullah Khan Award 2016-17 for History from Rampur Raza Library
- Member of the Advisory Committee for the H.K. Sherwani Centre for Deccan Studies, at Maulana Azad National Urdu University in Hyderabad from 2012 to 2015
- Fellow at the Royal Asiatic Society in 1983

== Selected publications ==
- Relations of Golkonda with Iran c.1518-1687: Diplomacy, Ideas, and Commerce Ideas (New Delhi: Primus Books, 2017)
- Mughal Archives: A Descriptive Catalogue of the documents about the reign of Shah Jahan (1628-1658), Vol 1. Durbar papers and a miscellany of singular documents (Andhra Pradesh: State Archives, 1977)
- A Descriptive catalog of the Batala collection of Mughal documents, 1527-1757 AD. (United Kingdom: British Library, 1990)
- A descriptive catalogue of Persian letters from Arcot and Baroda (United Kingdom: India Office Library and Records, British Library, 1982).
- Ghalib and Zuka, (New Delhi; Ghalib Academy, 1974)
- Ghalib on Hyderabad (Hyderabad, Adami Trust, 1969)
