= Javed Musarrat =

Professor Javed Musarrat (born 1960) is an Indian microbiologist and academic administrator who served as the Vice-Chancellor of Integral University, Lucknow. He earlier served as the Vice-Chancellor of Baba Ghulam Shah Badshah University, Rajouri, Jammu and Kashmir.

== Career ==
Prof. Mussarat has served in the United States as visiting scientist, Michigan State University and visiting assistant professor, Ohio State University, Columbus. He was also the Chair Professor, DNA Research Chair, King Saud University, Riyadh.

== Early life and education ==
Prior to his appointment he was the Dean of Faculty of Agricultural Sciences at Aligarh Muslim University and Chairman of Department of Agricultural Microbiology.
