= Divya Jain =

Indian software engineer

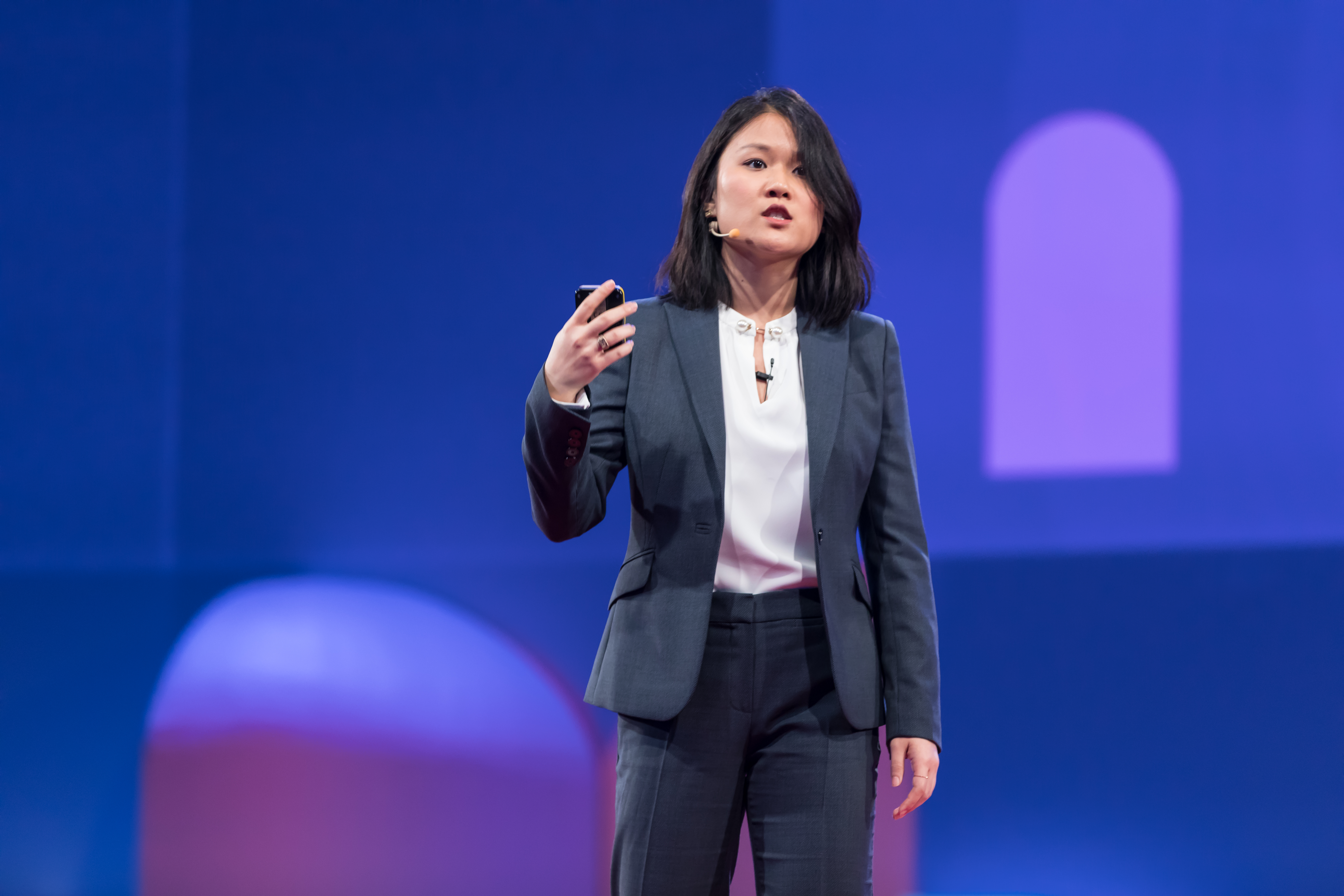
- Born: Roorkee, India
- Citizenship: United States
- Education: Aligarh Muslim University; San Jose State University
- Occupations: software engineer and entrepreneur
- Employer: Adobe inc.,

Divya Jain is an Indian origin software engineer and entrepreneur. Jain has been called a "data doyenne" by Fortune. She is currently a Director of ML at Google. Previously she was the Director of ML at Adobe and prior to that a Data Analysis Engineer at Box Data.

== Early life ==
Jain was raised in Roorkee, India with a family that valued education and technology. Jain has a bachelor's degree in electrical engineering from Aligarh University and received her master's degree in computer engineering from San Jose State University. She started working for Sun Microsystems in 2003 and at a startup called Kazeon Systems in 2005. Jain was a co-founder of dLoop, a data-analytics company. Later, she joined Box, after it acquired dLoop in 2013. At Box, she works on machine learning technology, data classification and content analysis.

== Family and culture ==
Divya was born in a small university town known as Roorkee, UP, India. After graduating from college, she married someone she knew for barely 30 minutes. A few days later, she moved too abroad to an unknown country where she knew only her husband.

== Education ==
Jain graduated from Aligarh University with a bachelor's degree in Electrical Engineering. A year later, she shifted to the US, and soon, graduated from San Jose State University with a master's degree in Computer Engineering.

== Career ==
Divya started her career working at Sun Microsystems in 2003, then moved to a start-up called Kazeon Systems in 2005. Later, in 2009, Kazeon Systems was taken over by EMC. In 2009, Big Data and Hadoop significantly starting growing in market share and popularity. Jain, fascinated and interested in the underlying technology, decided to pursue some formal education in the same and completed a one-year graduate course from Stanford in Data Mining and Analysis. Jain left EMC in 2011, worked for another startup till September that same year and then founded dLoop Inc. They specialized in providing Data Analytics for content.
