= Zahida Zaidi =

Indian scholar (1930–2011)

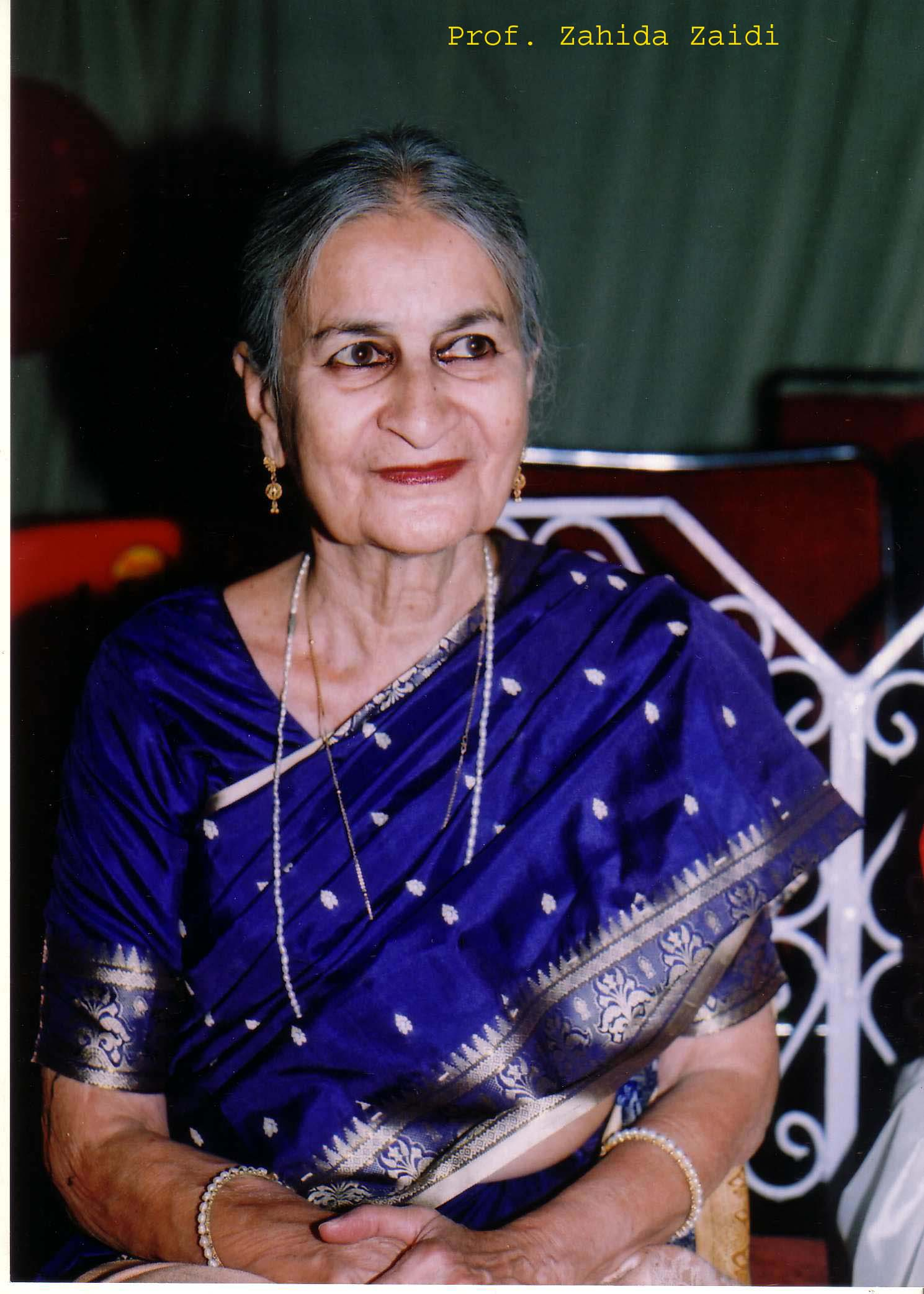
- Born: 4 January 1930; Meerut, United Provinces of Agra and Oudh, British India
- Died: 11 January 2011 (aged 81); Aligarh, Uttar Pradesh, India
- Education: Aligarh Muslim University, University of Cambridge
- Occupations: Writer and poet
- Known for: Poetry in Urdu and English
- Notable work: More than 30 books, and translations of Chekhov, Pirandello, Beckett, Sartre, and Ionesco

Zahida Zaidi (4 January 1930 – 11 January 2011) was an Indian scholar, professor of English literature, poet, dramatist, playwright, and literary critic. Her literary contributions include more than 30 books in Urdu and English related to social, psychological, and philosophical aspects, and the translation of the literary works of Chekhov, Pirandello, Beckett, Sartre, and Ionesco. She produced and directed several plays of Indian and Western authors in Urdu and English. She received the Hum Sab Ghalib Award for Urdu drama awarded by the Ghalib Institute, Delhi, and the Kul Hind Bahadur Shah Zafar Award.

== Early life and education ==
Zahida Zaidi was born on 4 January 1930 in Meerut, India. She was the youngest of five daughters. Her father, S.M. Mustehsin Zaidi, taught mathematics at the University of Cambridge and was a well-known advocate in Meerut. He died when Zaidi was very young. Her paternal grandfather, K. G. Saqulain, was a noted social reformer, while her maternal grandfather, Maulana Khwaja Altaf Hussain Hali, was an Urdu poet. An older sister, Sajida Zaidi, who died two months after her, was also a well-known poet and a professor of education at the Aligarh Muslim University (AMU); the two were famously known as the "Zaidi Sisters" in the literary community. Though from a conservative Muslim society, she and Sajida stopped wearing the burqa as students at the AMU and rode their bicycles to class.

Her widowed mother moved the family from Meerut to Panipat and sent her girls to study at the AMU, as it was a premier educational institution. At AMU, Zaidi obtained the degrees of Bachelor of Arts (BA) and Master of Arts (MA) in English language. She continued her academic career in England, studying with a Modified Overseas Merit Scholarship at the University of Cambridge, where she obtained BA Honours and MA degrees in English. On her return to India, she taught English at the Lady Irwin College and Miranda House, University of Delhi, and also at Women's College, AMU, from 1952 to 1964. She was appointed Reader in the AMU Department of English in 1964. In 1983 she became a Professor of English, and retired in 1988. Earlier, during 1971–72, she worked as a fellow at the Indian Institute of Advanced Study in Shimla.

== Literary career ==
Zaidi was a poet and dramatist of distinction in English and Urdu. Her translations into Urdu include the plays of Anton Chekhov, Luigi Pirandello, Jean-Paul Sartre, and Samuel Beckett, as well as Pablo Neruda's poetry; these works were translated from the original versions in French, Italian, and English. She proficiently staged many of these plays. Besides drama, her interests included philosophy and religion, and Western, Indian, and Persian literature. Through her writings, she was fond of expressing an "existential and mystical strain" and had a knack for word-play. Her debut collection of poetry, Zahr-e-Hyat (Life's Poison) (1970), earned her the Urdu Academy Award in 1971. Her second poetry collection was titled Dharti ka Lams (Touch of Earth) (1975). Her poems titled Beyond Words and Broken Pieces were published in 1979. Her last book was Glimpses of Urdu Literature, which included a section on Nature in Iqbal's poetry.

Zaidi died in Aligarh on 11 January 2011.
