= Integral University =

Private university in Lucknow, Uttar Pradesh, India

- IU Lucknow logo
- Former names: Institute of Integral Technology, Dasauli
- Motto: Inspiring Excellence
- Type: Private
- Established: 1998
- Founder: S.W Akhtar
- Accreditation: NAAC A+
- Academic affiliations: UGC
- Chancellor: S. W. Akhtar
- Vice-Chancellor: Furqan Qamar
- Students: 12000+
- Location: Lucknow, Uttar Pradesh, India; 26.9585°N 80.9981°E
- Campus: Urban
- Website: iul.ac.in

Integral University is a private university in Lucknow, the capital of Uttar Pradesh, India, It is located in the North-eastern part of the city in Dashauli, approximately 17Km from the center of the City. Integral University, the first enacted Minority University in the country, started functioning from 1 April 2004. U.G.C. accorded Integral University recognition under section 2(f) of the U.G.C. Act, 1956. The university was founded in 2004.

== History ==
=== Founding ===
The foundation stone was laid on 3 November 1993 by Abul Hasan Ali Hasani Nadwi, rector of Darul-uloom Nadwatul Ulama at the Institute of Integral Technology, Lucknow. The main building was inaugurated by the then governor of Uttar Pradesh Motilal Vora on 14 January 1996. An engineering college was simultaneously established by the Islamic Council for Productive Education (ICPE) in 1997, which started functioning in 1998 with two courses; Computer Science Engineering, and Electronics Engineering. Later other courses like Architecture, Information Technology, Mechanical Engineering, Civil Engineering, and Master of Computer Application were added. Atal Bihari Vajpayee, the then prime minister of India, laid the foundation stone of a residential complex on 30 June 1999. During his speech, he expressed his hope that the Institute of Integral Technology, Lucknow having the abbreviation IIT will maintain the same standard as the other IITs do. The Institute is then affiliated to Uttar Pradesh Technical University.

=== Transformation into university ===
In recognition of the growth of the school, then Chief Minister of Uttar Pradesh, Mulayam Singh Yadav declared that the Institute of Integral Technology, Lucknow shall be elevated to a full-fledged university in no time. He granted Minority Status to the institute. Soon after this declaration, he got the bill passed in the Assembly on 26 February 2004 and issued Govt. Gazette Notification No. 389/ lkr - fo -1-1 (d)-9-2004 dated 27 February 2004 for the formation of Integral University, Lucknow, under Act Number 9 of 2004 by the Uttar Pradesh state government. It is approved under Sections 2(F), 22(1) & 12(B) of UGC Act, 1956. It has been declared eligible to receive Central Assistance under Section 12(B) of the UGC Act, 1956. U.G.C. accorded Integral University recognition under section 2(f) of U.G.C. Act, 1956. The university started in 2004. The existing faculties in the university were re-organized and new faculties of Science, Pharmacy, Education, Management Studies, Health & Medical Sciences, Agricultural Science & Technology, Humanities & Social Sciences, Computer Applications, Medical Sciences & Allied Health Sciences, and Law were added.

== Academics ==
=== Faculties ===
Integral University consists of 11 faculties:

- Faculty of Agriculture Science & Technology
- Faculty of Architecture, Planning & Design
- Faculty of Commerce & Management
- Faculty of Education
- Faculty of Engineering & IT
- Faculty of Health & Medical Sciences
- Faculty of Humanities & Social Sciences
- Faculty of Law
- Faculty of Pharmacy
- Faculty of Science
- Faculty of Nursing

== Rankings ==
=== Faculty of Architecture, Planning & Design ===
Department of Architecture, Faculty of Architecture, Planning & Design, Integral University was ranked 28 in the department of architecture ranking in India by National Institutional Ranking Framework (NIRF) in 2023.

=== Faculty of Law ===
Integral University was ranked 41 in the faculty of law ranking in India by National Institutional Ranking Framework (NIRF) in 2023.

=== Pharmacy ===
University rankings

General – India
- NIRF (Overall) (2024): 151-200
- Outlook India (Emerging Universities) (2022): 19

Pharmacy – India
- NIRF (2024): 45

Integral University was ranked 45 in the pharmacy ranking in India by National Institutional Ranking Framework (NIRF) in 2024.

Integral University is also NAAC A+ Accredited Institution.
