= Obaidur Rahman Siddiqui =

Indian historian

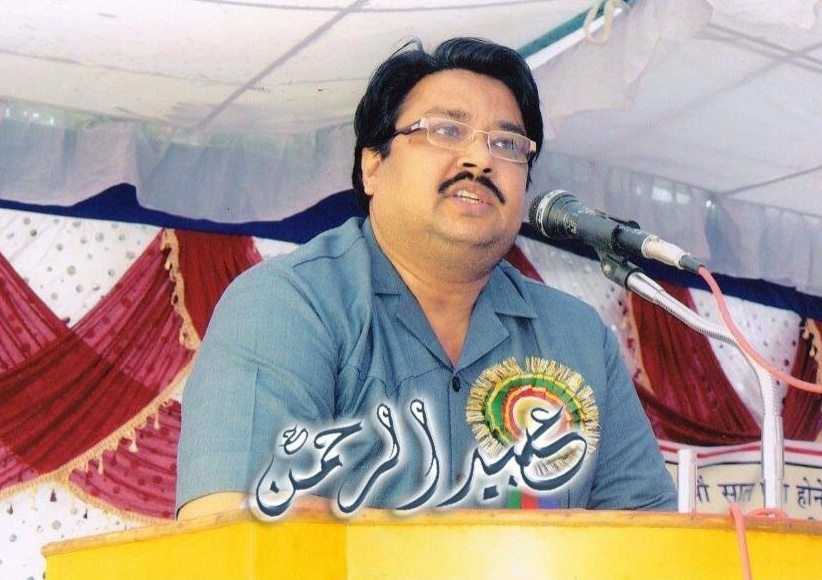
- Obaidur Rahman Siddiqui
- Born: Obaidur Rahman Siddiqui; 5 June 1964 (age 62); Mohalla Machchar Hatta, Uttar Pradesh, India
- Other name: Ubaidur Rahman Makki
- Known for: Literature and History
- Spouse: Zohra Obaid
- Website: http://ghazipurwalamakki.blogspot.in

Obaid-ur-Rehman Siddiqui (born 5 June 1964 at Mohalla Machchar Hatta, Uttar Pradesh, India), is an Indian historian. He is the only historian from Ghazipur who has written the History of Ghazipur beginning from the ancient time until Mughal time. He compiled his work era-wise of lost ancient era, Delhi Sultanate and Mughal Empire. For this work he was awarded the title of "Ghazi Pur Ka Fahian" by the Samrat Ashok Club of Ghazipur. Beside history he has a literary blog known as "Ghazipur Wala Ubaid" which is very popular among literary, social and political circles.

== Early life ==
Obaid-ur-Rehman was born in an influential family. His family background influenced his literary and research works. He started and finished his initial education up to 5th class from Madarsa-e-Deenia then passed his 6th class from Madarsa-e-Azeemia. He completed his Junior High School education and Intermediate from the Muslim Anglo Hindustani College, then completed his graduation from Post Graduate Degree College, Ghazipur. After graduation in 1984 he migrated to Allahabad where he obtained degrees in LL.B and Journalism from Allahabad University. Then he went to Delhi and appeared in I.A.S. Examination, and couldn't clear the final interview and came back to his homeland Ghazipur. Temporarily he served as a lecturer in Adarsh Inter College but the profession of teaching couldn't satiate his pursuit of learning and he quit the teaching profession. Finally he settled as a writer and started writing in well known Indian news papers and magazines which continues to this day.

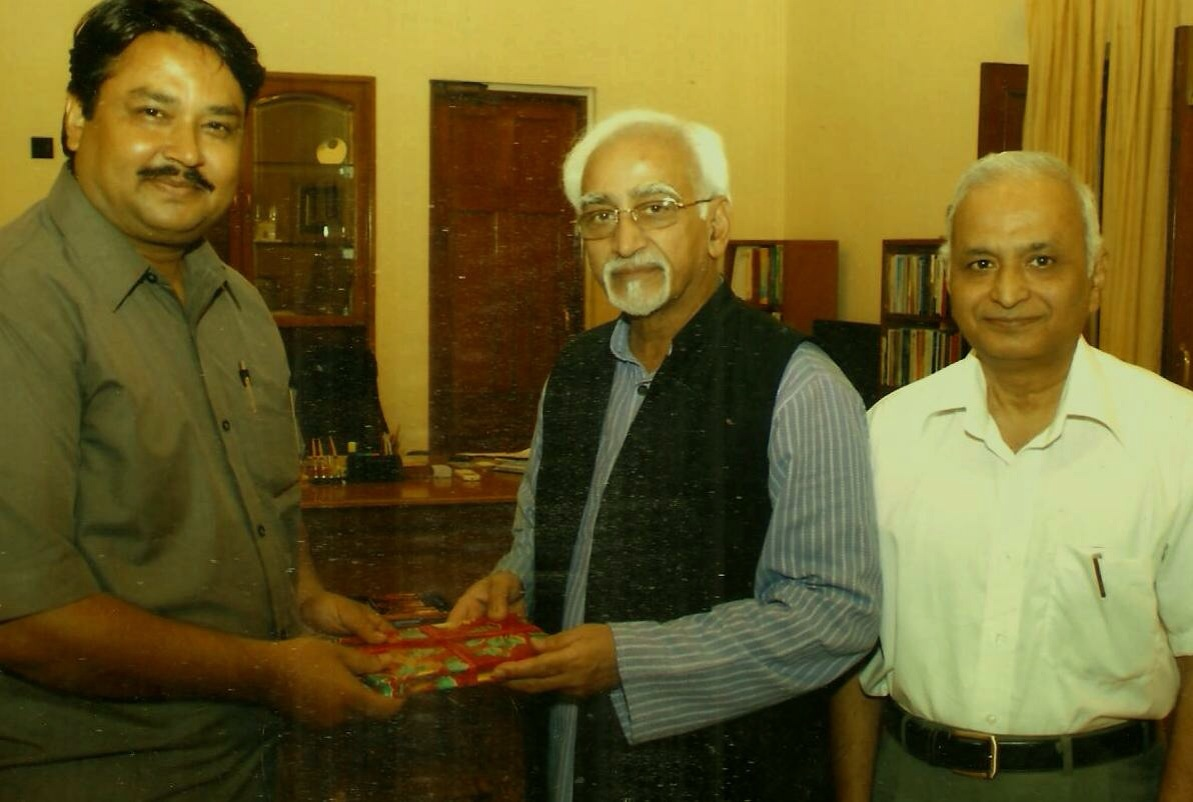
Obaidur-Rahman with Hamid Ansari

== Career ==
Obaid-ur-Rehman Siddiqui started writing essays at the age of 19 and in 1984 when he was a student he wrote his first essay on the assassination of then Indian Prime Minister Mrs. Indra Gandhi. So far he has written and published about 1500 articles, essays and thesis work in English, Urdu, Hindi and other regional languages. Various Indian TV channels have made and telecasted documentaries on him and his literary work. Few of them are Door Darshan Delhi, E-TV Urdu, Hyderabad, Zee Salam Urdu, E-TV Uttar Pradesh etc. Apart from this he has participated in different radio stations who broadcast his features, programs on current affairs and literary pieces.

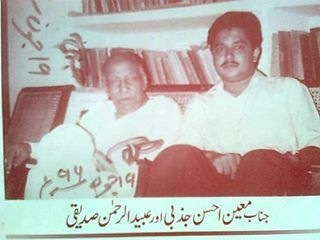
Obaidur Rahman Siddiqui with Moin Ahsan jazbi

He wrote and published the following books:

- Tazkirah Mashaikh Ghazi Pur
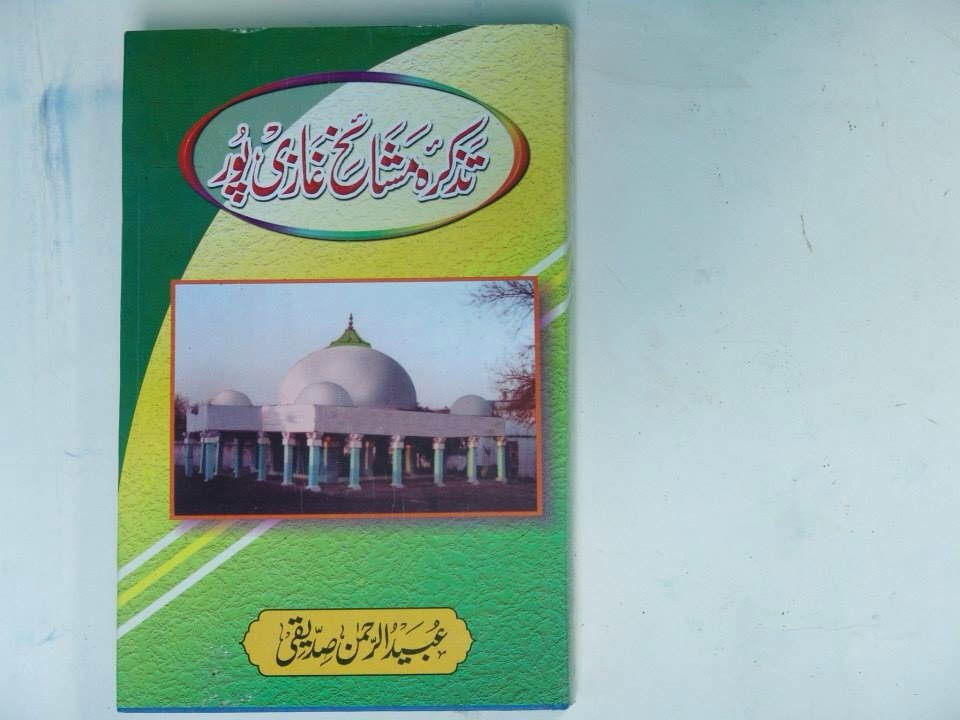
  Tazkirah mashaikh Ghazipur by Obaidur Rahman Siddiqui
- Ghazipur Ka Adabi Pus-Manzar
- Ghazipur Banam Ghadhi Puri Aik Aulokan
- Ghazipur Main Gautam Budh
- Samrat Ashok and Bodh Asthal

== Awards ==
Different organizations have awarded medals or honours to Obaid-ur-Rehman including:

- Ghazipur Ratan Award
- Ghazipur Ke Ras Khan Award
- Youth Literary Award
- Ghalib Award (Ref.2007 Dainik Jagran Ghazipur Edition)
- Al Moamal Award by Al Moamal Shodh Santhan, Lucknow
- Molvi Rehmat Ullah Award by Madars-e-Chashma-Rehmat.
- Hazrat Aasi Award
