= Sajida Zaidi =

Indian educationist, writer in the Urdu language, and poet

- Born: 1926; Panipat, Punjab, British India
- Died: 11 March 2011 (aged 84–85); Dubai, United Arab Emirates
- Occupations: Educationist, writer, and poet
- Years active: 1955–1985
- Known for: Poetry in Urdu
- Notable work: Ju-e-Naghma and Sel-e-Wajid

Sajida Zaidi (1926 – 11 March 2011) was an Indian educationist, writer in the Urdu language, and poet. For many years she was a professor and head of the Department of Education at the Aligarh Muslim University (AMU) until her 1966 retirement.

Zaidi was a feminist in thought and deed, and this was reflected in her novel Mauj-e-Hawa-Paichan which dealt with an unconventional sexual relationship. Her philosophy progressed through stages of "religiosity, Marxism, humanism, and finally existentalism".

Zaidi was honoured by many prestigious institutions. She received the Bahadur Shah Zafar Award in 2008 and the Urdu Academy Award in 2009 from the Delhi Urdu Academy for her contribution to the Urdu language and literature.

== Biography ==
Zaidi was born in 1926 at Panipat, India. She had four sisters. Her father, S.M. Mustehsin Zaidi, taught mathematics at the University of Cambridge and died when she was eight years old. She learned from her father about the poetry of Ghalib, Iqbal, and Hafez, a Persian poet. Her paternal grandfather, K.G. Saqulain, was a noted social reformer; while her maternal grandfather, Maulana Khwaja Altaf Husain Hali, was an Urdu poet. Her younger sister, Zahida Zaidi, who died two months before her, also became a well-known poet and professor of English literature at the Aligarh Muslim University (AMU); the two were famously known as the "Zaidi Sisters" in the literary community. Despite coming from a conservative Muslim society, she and her sister stopped wearing the burqa as students at the AMU and rode their bicycles to class. She was also influenced by her eldest sister, Sabira Zaidi.

Zaidi started working at the AMU as a lecturer in 1955 and attained several important positions, contributing to the development of the institution until her retirement in 1986. Concurrent with her teaching assignment, she pursued poetry writing from 1958. Her debut poetry collection, titled Ju-e-Naghma (Stream of Melody), was published in 1962. Journals and magazines in Pakistan published her poems in the early years of her career; one such composition was Aaatish-e-Sayyal (Liquid Fire), published in 1972. Her writings also included dramas in verse form and the adaptation of Federico Garcia Lorca's Yerma into Urdu theater. Her writing was influenced by Friedrich Nietzsche, Carl Jung, Jean-Paul Sartre, and Franz Kafka. In 1986, her collection of poems titled Sel-e-Wajid (Flow of Existence) was published.

Zaidi was a designated member of the University Grants Commission (UGC) on the educational panel. Some of the other important assignments she held were membership in the National Council of Educational Research and Training (NCERT), the Bureau for Promotion of Urdu, and the National Council for Promotion of Urdu Language.

Zaidi died in Dubai on 11 March 2011 at the age of 84 due to illness.

== Awards ==
Zaidi received a plethora of awards for her literary contribution to Urdu language and poetry. Some of these awards are: The Imtiaz-e-Mir Award, the Ghalib 'Ham Sab' Award for Drama, several Uttar Pradesh Urdu Academy Awards, the All-India Bihar Urdu Academy Award for 'Sarhad Koi Naheen', the Sydney Literary Society Award, and the Canberra Literary Society Award.

== Publications ==
Zaidi has many publications to her credit, such as Urdu poems in five books, poetic dramas, and literary critiques. She translated many of her works into English, Russian, Oriya, Marathi, and Hindi languages. Following her death in 2011, her autobiography was slated for publication.

== Appreciation ==
Commenting on Zaidi's proficiency in poetry, critic Syed Sirajuddin observed that her poems "have a somewhat dry, cognitive quality and she keeps an incipient romanticism at bay with her intellection".
