= Akshay Kumar Jain =

Indian journalist and writer (died 1993)

- Born: 30 December 1915; Bijaigarh, Aligarh district, Uttar Pradesh, India
- Died: 31 December 1993 (aged 78); Mumbai, Maharashtra, India
- Occupations: Journalist writer indian independence activist
- Years active: 1939–93
- Known for: Navbharat Times
- Awards: Padma Bhushan; Sahitya Ratna Award

Akshay Kumar Jain (1915–1993) was an Indian independence activist, writer, journalist and the editor of Navbharat Times, a Hindi-language daily owned by The Times Group. He was one of the founders of the National Union of Journalists (India) and held the chair of its reception committee when the organization was formed in 1972.

== Early life ==
Born on 30 December 1915 at Bijaigarh in Aligarh district of the Indian state of Uttar Pradesh to Roop Kishore Jain, who was a Diwan, Jain graduated from Holkar Science College, Indore in 1938 and followed it up with a degree in law (LLB) from Aligarh University in 1940. During this period, he was involved with the Indian freedom movement and participated in the Quit India movement of 1942.

== Career ==
He started his career in 1939 at Daily Sainik while studying for law and was involved with Hindusthan Samachar, Sudarshan weekly (editor 1940), and Vir (1940–46) before joining Navbharat Times when the daily was founded in 1946. He continued with them for 31 years till his retirement in 1977 as its Editor-in-Chief.

Jain presided two sessions of All-India Newspapers Editors Conference (1964 and 1967) and served as the member of the Press Council of India for two terms. He chaired the board of directors of Samachar Bharati News Agency, presided the Hindi Patrakar Sangh and was a member of the International Press Institute, a global organization promoting press freedom and fair journalistic practices. He published several books in Hindi language which included Yada rahi mulakatem and Bacapana ki batem. The Government of India awarded him the third highest civilian honour of the Padma Bhushan, in 1967, for his contributions to literature and journalism. Jain, who was also a recipient of the Sahitya Ratna Award (1970), died on 31 March 1993, at the age of 78.

== See also ==
- Navbharat Times
- List of Aligarh Muslim University alumni
