= Qazi Abdul Sattar =

Qazi Abdul Sattar (8 February 1933 at Machhrehta(Sitapur)– 29 October 2018 at New Delhi) was an Indian novelist and short story writer who wrote in Urdu.

He had penned several Urdu novels – mainly set in historical contexts – including Shab Gazida, Dara Shikoh, Salahuddin Ayyubi, Khalid Ibn-e-Waleed, and Ghalib.

== Early life and education ==
He was born in 1933 in Machreta near Sitapur. He completed his post graduation from Lucknow University. In 1954 he joined Aligarh Muslim University as a researcher. He served as a Professor of Urdu in Aligarh Muslim University until his retirement in 1991.

== Books ==
Fiction

- Shikast ki Awaaz (also published as Pehli Aur Akhiri Kitaab)
- Shab-Ghazida (1966)
- Kaali Raat Ka Dasa Hua (2023, Rajmangal Prakashan)
- Baadal
- Majju Bhaiya
- Gubaar-e-Shab
- Salahuddin Ayyubi (1968)
- Dara Shikoh (1968)
- Ghalib (1976)
- Hazrat Jaan
- Khalid Ibn-e-Waleed
- Tajam Sultan
- Aaen-e-Ayyam
- Peetal ka Ghanta

Critics

- Urdu Shaiyri Mein Qunutiat
- Jamaliyaat Aur Hindustani Jamaliyaat

== Awards received ==
In 1974 he won the Padma Shri.
