= Shamim Jairajpuri =

Indian zoologist (1942–2024)

- Born: 8 April 1942; Azamgarh district, United Provinces, British India
- Died: 10 January 2024 (aged 81); New Delhi, India
- Education: PhD, DSc
- Alma mater: AMU Aligarh
- Known for: Taxonomy of Nematodes
- Awards: First Janaki Ammal National Award for Taxonomy (1999);INSA-Fellow (2004-2009).
- Scientific career
- Fields: Zoology
- Institutions: AMU Aligarh, Zoological Survey of India, Maulana Azad National Urdu University Hyderabad
- Notable students: Qudsia Tahseen

Mohammad Shamim Jairajpuri (8 April 1942 – 10 January 2024) was an Indian zoologist. He served as a professor and Chairman of the Zoology Department (1988–1989 and 1997–1998) and Dean of the Faculty of Life Sciences (1993–1995 and 1997–1998) at Aligarh Muslim University Aligarh before retirement in 2004. He received the first Janaki Ammal National Award bestowed by the Government of India, Ministry of Environment & Forests and Lifetime Achievement Award from the Zoological Society of India for his notable works on taxonomy of nematodes (1964–2004).

== Early life and education ==
Mohammad Shamim Jairajpuri was born in Azamgarh district on 8 April 1942. He received his education at Aligarh Muslim University, completing his B.Sc, M.Sc., and Ph.D. in Zoology in 1964.

== Positions ==
In 1998, he became the first Vice Chancellor of the newly formed Maulana Azad National Urdu University. He was credited by The Milli Gazette as "a leading personality" toward the establishment of the aforementioned university. Earlier he had acted as Coordinator of the Agriculture Center at AMU and became the Founder Director of the Institute of Agriculture in 1993 at AMU.

== Research ==
Jairajpuri researched the taxonomy and biology of the plant and soil nematodes, with the results being published in more than 300 research papers. In addition, he is the author of several books on the subject.

== Death ==
Jairajpuri died in New Delhi on 10 January 2024, at the age of 81.

== Selected bibliography ==
- M. Shamim Jairajpuri; Qaisar Baqri (2019). Chapter, Root Knot Nematode Symptoms, Loss and Control, In Book Nematode Pests of Rice. pp. 37–43. doi:10.1201/9780429034749-5. S2CID 196674064.
- M. Shamim Jairajpuri (1992). Nematode Pests of Rice. CRC Press. p. 80. doi:10.1201/9780429034749. ISBN 978-0-429-03474-9. S2CID 83385467.
- Jairajpuri and Ahmad (25 March 2010). Mononchida (Nematology Monographs and Perspectives, 7). BRILL; Pp. ed. ISBN 978-9004174641.
- Mahlaqa Choudhary &; M. Shamim Jairajpuri (2010). "Evolutionary trends in soil-inhabiting alaimid nematodes". Nematologica.
- Qudsia Tahseen, Irfan Ahmad and M. Shamim Jairajpuri (1999). "Observations on three species of the subfamily Acrobelinae (Nematoda: Cephalobidae) from India". Nematology. 1 (5): 527–537. doi:10.1163/156854199508522.
- M. Shamim Jairajpuri (1982). "The systematic position of Californidorus Robbins & Weiner, 1978 (Nematoda: Dorylaimida)". Systematic Parasitology. 4 (2): 135–137. doi:10.1007/BF00018994. S2CID 12033926.
- W Ahmad, MS Jairajpuri (2010). Mononchida: the predatory soil nematodes. BRILL. ISBN 9789047428107.

== Honours and awards ==
- Honorary D.Sc. Aligarh Muslim University Aligarh (1970)
- Senior Scientist-Indian National Science Academy (2004-2009)
- Professor Har Swarup Memorial Lecture (2000), and
- Jawaharlal Nehru Birth Centenary Visiting Fellowship (2004).
- Principal Nematologist, Commonwealth Agricultural Bureaux International, United Kingdom(1981–83).
- Director of the Zoological Survey of India (1989-1991)
- President of the Nematological Society of India (1979 -1981)
- President of the Zoological Society (1989-1991)
- Editorial Board Member, the Indian Journal of Nematology
- Shiksha Ratna Puruskar, 2007, by India International Friendship Society
- Lifetime Achievement Award in Parasitology,Indian Society for Parasitology
