= Syed Babar Ashraf =

Indian Sufi leader

Hazrat Syed Babar Ashraf Ashrafi Al-Jilani
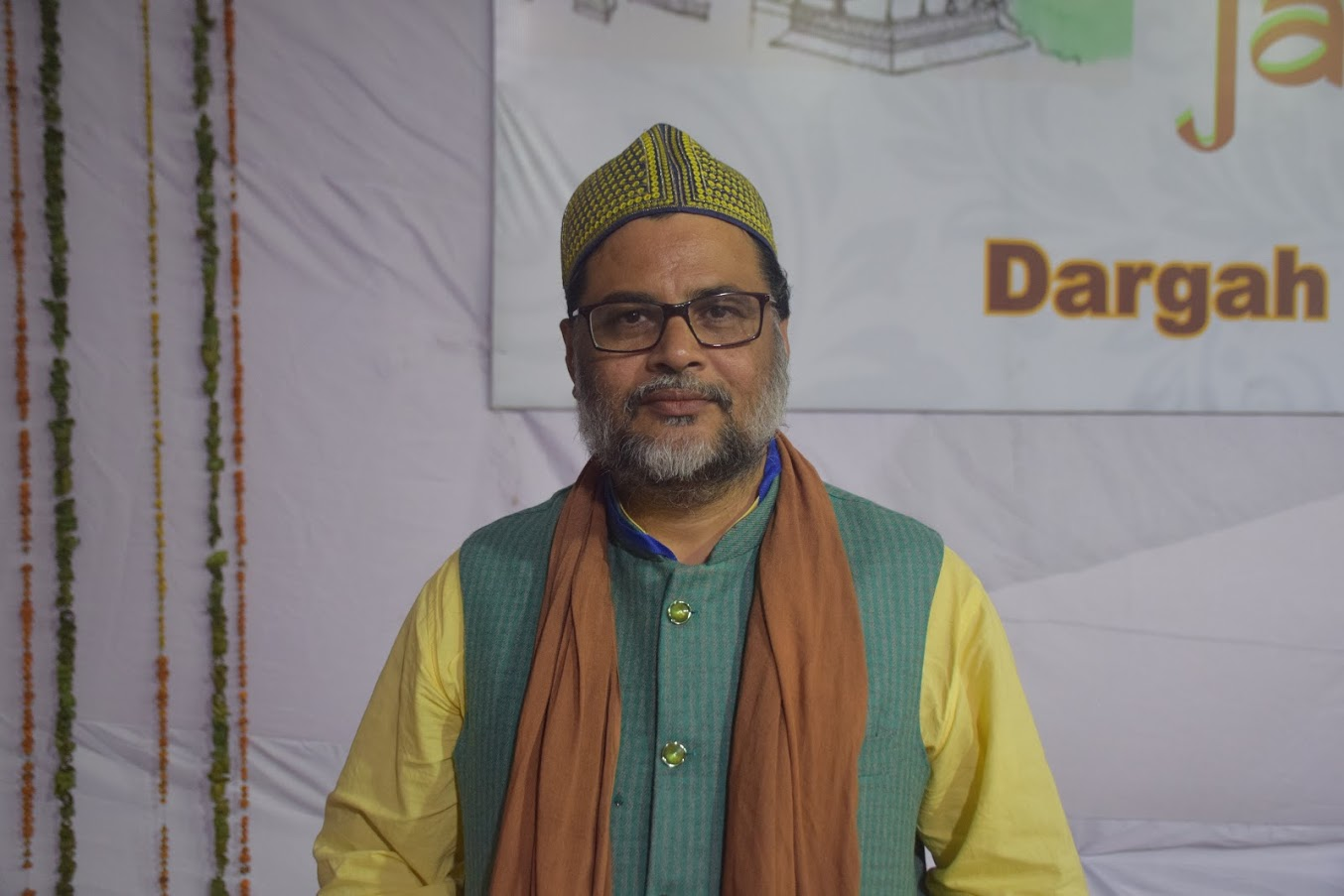
- Ashraf at Ajmer Dargah
- Born: Ambedkar Nagar, Uttar Pradesh
- Education: Aligarh Muslim University
- Occupations: Founder President, Sada-e-Sufia-e-Hind (SUVOI) Member, Maulana Azad Education Foundation, Ministry of Minority Affairs, Govt. of India

Syed Babar Ashraf is an Indian social activist and leader belonging to the Barelvi movement of Sunni Islam. He is the Founder President of Sada-e-Sufia-e-Hind, a representative body of Sufis in India.

He had formerly been the General secretary of All India Ulema and Mashaikh Board from 17 December 2013, but was sacked from the post on 16 August 2015, after anti-organisational activities.

== Activism ==
During the pre-election period in India, Ashraf exhorted Muslims to vote those candidates "who are secular and have a clean image irrespective of their party affiliations." He denounced any move that was detrimental to the national good of the country. He has always been a strong critic of Wahhabism, Salafism, and associated ideologies. He has been promoting a Dargah Act to manage dargahs of Sufi saints according to Sufi traditions. Many Muslim heritage sites under Archaeological Survey of India belong to Sufi Muslims that have now been usurped. Ashraf is against such usurpation.

=== Barelvi and Khadim Controversies ===
Ashraf said that controversies should not be happen in the Dargah of Khwaja, he shown anger to Sarwar Chishty and said he is the main accused of the controversy.
