= Azarmi Dukht Safavi =

Indian linguist

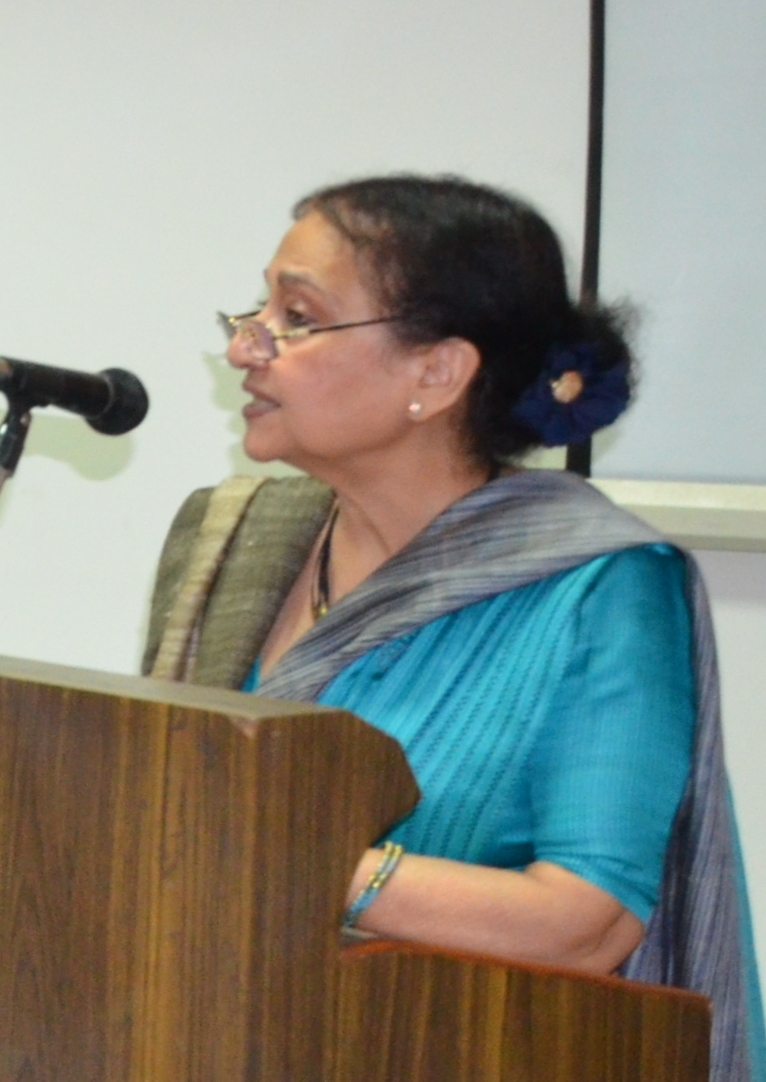
2015

Azarmi Dukht Safavi (born 1948) is an Indian scholar, founding director of the Institute of Persian Research and the head of the Persian Language Research Center at Aligarh Muslim University. She is the president of the All India Persian Teachers’ Association, New Delhi, and the editor of the magazine Ghand Parsi.

Safavi is known for her works in the Gulistan.

== Education ==
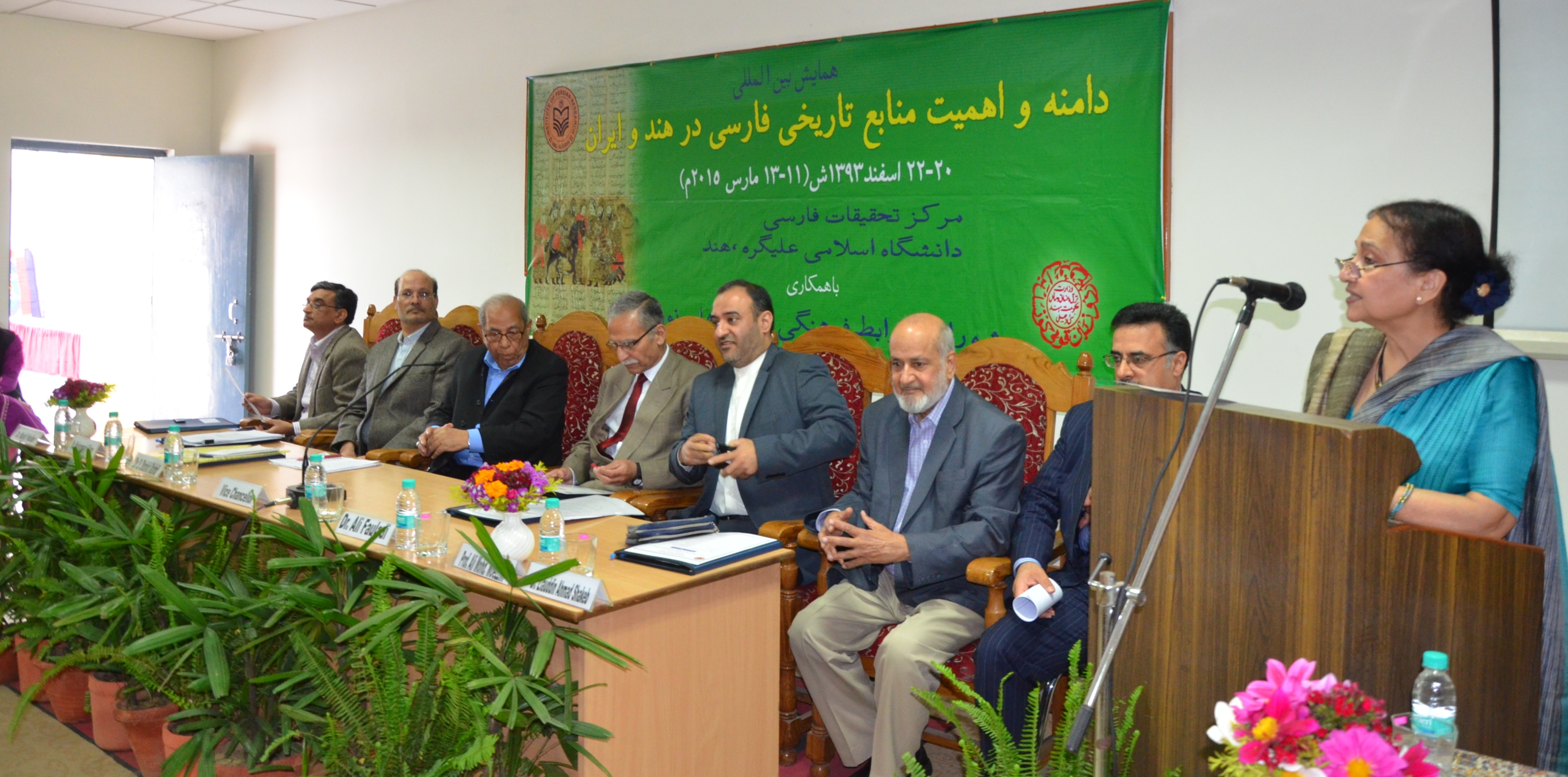
Aligar azarmidokt

After completing her primary and secondary education, Safavi joined Aligarh Muslim University to pursue higher studies in Persian. She completed her B.A. in 1966, M.A. in 1968, and Ph.D. in Persian in 1974. The topic of her Ph.D. thesis was "Sadi as a Humanist and Lyricist". Her Ph.D. supervisor was the late Nazeer Ahmad.

After finishing her Ph.D., Safavi was appointed as a lecturer in the Department of Persian, where she taught as a professor for 32 years. She speaks Persian, English, Urdu, and Hindi.

== Persian origin ==
Safavi is from the family of the Nawabs of Lucknow (Uttar Pradesh, India), and her family belongs to the Safavid dynasty of Iran. Shah Rahmatullah Safavi, the great grandfather of Safavi, came to India during the reign of the Indian Mughal king Muhammad Shah in 1737. He was the governor of Azeemabad (Patna). Later on, the family migrated to Delhi and Lucknow before settling in Shamsabad, Uttar Pradesh. Safavi's great grandfather Nawab Wali, alias Nawab Dulha, was a prolific writer and author of more than 20 books in Persian. Her father, Mohammad Sadiq Safavi, was her first Persian teacher and inspired her to study the language. He was a Persian scholar who completed his M.A. in Persian at Aligarh Muslim University. His articles were regularly published in leading Iranian literary journals, including Yaghma and Sukhan.

== Institute of Persian Research ==
Safavi is the founder-director of the Institute established in 2006 at Aligarh Muslim University. She wrote a proposal to establish the Institute, which was approved by the Government of India. The Institute is focused on developing Persian language and literature. Its programs include Publication, Seminars/Conferences, lectures by eminent Iranian and Indian scholars, and training in modern/spoken Persian. The Institute has published 45 books and monographs and organized seven seminars to date.

In 2006, Safavi established the Persian Language Research Center at Aligarh University.

== Publications ==
Safavi has published more than 150 research papers in Persian, English, and Urdu in national and international journals.

=== Books ===
- Tashreeh-ul-Aqwam, Critical Edition with Introduction and Notes
- Akhbar-ul-Jamal, Critical Edition with Introduction and Notes
- Bahr-e-Zakhkhar, (03 Volumes) Critical Edition with Introduction and Notes
- Relevance of Rumi's Thought in Modern Times
- Sufistic Literature in Persian: Tradition and Dimensions, Vol. I & II
- Aftab-e-Alamtab, Critical Edition with Introduction and Notes
- Tazkirah Writing in Persian, Vol. I & II
- Revisiting Adabiat-e-Dastani in Persian, Vol. I, II
- Unsut-Taibeen – English Translation
- Persian Masnawi, Vol. I, II
- Arafatul Ashiqin, Volume 2, Critical Edition with Introduction and Notes
- Post Islamic Revolution Short Stories in Iran, Translation from Persian
- Indo-Iranian Heritage, Vol. I, II
- Nazm-e-Guzidah, Critical Edition with Introduction and Notes
- Silkus Suluk, Critical Edition with Introduction and Notes
- Chehl Namoos, Critical Edition with Introduction and Notes
- Persian Ghazal: Tradition and Dimensions, Vol. I & II
- Indology and Persian Literature
- Humanism and Universal Brotherhood in Persian Literature, Vol. I, II
- Revolution & Creativity
- Ijaz Khusravi, English Translation, Vol. I
- Mukhkhul Maana, Critical Edition with Introduction and notes
- Impact of Persian Language & Culture on India
- Indo-Iran Relations
- Contribution of Persian Language and Literature to the Composite Culture of India
- Adab Shanasi
- Unsut-Taibeen – Annotated English Translation of Shiakh Ahmad Jam's Famous Sufistic Treatise; Zohra Publications, London, U.K.

== See also ==
- Persian Inscriptions on Indian Monuments
