= Protein Science =

- Discipline: Biochemistry
- Language: English
- Edited by: John Kuriyan

Publication details
- History: Since 1992
- Publisher: Wiley-Blackwell
- Frequency: Monthly
- Open access: Delayed
- Impact factor: 5.2 (2024)

Standard abbreviations
- ISO 4: Protein Sci.

Indexing
- CODEN: PRCIEI
- ISSN: 0961-8368 (print); 1469-896X (web)
- LCCN: 92660027
- OCLC no.: 25450084
- ISSN: 1359-5040

Links
- Journal homepage; Online access

Protein Science is a peer-reviewed scientific journal covering research on the structure, function, and biochemical significance of proteins, their role in molecular and cell biology, genetics, and evolution, and their regulation and mechanisms of action. It is published by Wiley-Blackwell on behalf of The Protein Society. The 2022 impact factor of the journal is 8.0.

== Abstracting and indexing ==
Since January 2008, published articles are deposited in PubMed Central with a 12-month embargo. The journal is indexed and abstracted in MEDLINE, Science Citation Index Expanded, and Scopus.
