= Qudsia Tahseen =

Indian nematologist

- Born: 15 December 1964 (age 61); Azamgarh
- Education: Aligarh Muslim University
- Known for: Nematology
- Awards: first Asian to be awarded by Organisation of Nematologist of Tropical America (ONTA)
- Scientific career
- Fields: Nematology, Classical & Molecular Taxonomy, Developmental Biology
- Workplaces: Women's College, AMU; Aligarh Muslim University
- Doctoral advisor: M. Shamim Jairajpuri

Qudsia Tahseen (born 15 December 1964) is a Professor of Zoology at Aligarh Muslim University and teaches Animal Ecology as well as Nematology to the students of the Masters programme. Her areas of research include taxonomy and developmental biology of terrestrial and aquatic nematodes. Her thrust areas are Biodiversity, Taxonomy, Ecology and developmental biology of soil and fresh water nematodes. She is a fellow of two national science academies of India.

== Education ==
Qudsia Tahseen's schooling was from Azamgarh. From there, she moved on to pursue higher education in Zoology from Aligarh Muslim University. She completed her M.Sc. in Zoology in the year 1984 and was awarded a Gold Medal. She also pursued a Diploma in Statistics. She joined research in the Department of Zoology and completed her M.Phil in 1987 and Ph.D in 1989.

== Career ==
Qudsia Tahseen's first appointment as a faculty was in 1989 in Women's College AMU even before she had received the PhD degree. In 1997, she got transferred to the Department of Zoology, Aligarh Muslim University first serving as a Reader and then a full Professor.

== Research ==
She has been carrying out numerous studies on taxonomy, biodiversity, and biology of soil and aquatic nematodes resulting in discovery and description of several new species of Nematodes from India. Most recently her group discovered an intermediate species between two different genera of Nematodes. In view of the scarcity of reports on these groups from India, she undertook the challenging task of exploring Indian habitats and made critical observations on the structure and morphology of free-living nematodes using LM and SEM. She has described and revised a good number of nematode taxa and has addressed the taxonomic identification from different perspectives so as to adopt a holistic approach combining morphological, developmental and ecological characteristics for better scientific value instead of the lopsided shallow morphological study. Her lucid and critical analyses of species supplemented with Scanning Electron Microscopic details were commended by peers and her wide taxonomic skills have been accredited internationally as she remains so far the only Asian to receive ONTA Special Award for sustained excellence in Nematology. She has also conducted pioneering studies in India on nematode development while her ecological findings led to the understanding of shifts in subterranean food web. Due to the skills and expertise, she has been invited to labs of Europe and America under fellowships of Royal Society, Rothamsted International, INSA, DBT, TWAS, TWOWS, Chinese Academy of Sciences, European Union Consortium, Australian Academy of Science etc. for collaborative research or to teach/ guide post-graduate students at Erasmus Mundus and EUMAINE programmes.

== Awards and honours ==
Qudsia Tahseen is the first Asian to receive the ONTA (Organization of Nematologists of Tropical America) Special Award in 2005 for sustained excellence in Nematology. She has been recognized for her accomplishments in the field with many reputed fellowships including =

- Indian Academy of Sciences, Bangalore
- Royal Society, Rothamsted International, U.K.
- Indian National Science Academy, Department of Biotechnology, India
- Third world of Academy of Science, Italy
- Rothamsted International Fellow (2003)
- ONTA (Organization of Nematologists of Tropical America) Special Award (2005) for world‐wide expertise in taxonomy and sustained excellence in Nematology (First Asian to be honoured)
- INSA visiting Scientist (2001)
- DBT Overseas Fellow (2006)
- Visiting Scholar, TWAS‐CAS (2007‐08)
- Erasmus Mundus Scholar (2010‐11)
- Work has been regarded as an 'exemplary contribution' by an eminent German Nematologist (Sudhaus, 2011) in the latest taxonomic revision on Rhabditidae.
- Selected under INSA‐DFG Bilateral Exchange Programme to visit Germany (2018)
- Funded by Max Planck Institute of Developmental Biology, Tubingen, Germany to carry out collaborative research for three months (May-Aug, 2018).

Her taxonomic skills have been credited in view of the diminishing taxonomists as she has been invited to reputed labs of Europe and America.

Her biography has been included in "Lilawati's Daughters ‐ Top Hundred Women Scientists of India" Published by the Indian Academy of Sciences. and in "The Girl's Guide to a Life in Science" By Young Zubaan Publishers (One of the twenty three selected biographies of renowned Indian women scientists to encourage and incite young girls to opt for a science career); Editors: Ram Ramaswamy, Rohini Godbole and Mandakini Dubey (2011)

She was also mentioned in the "Noted Women Scientists of India – An Attempt at Enumeration" in Scilog (Germany) in association with nature.com and in Life, an e‐newsletter on Biological Sciences.

== Books and other publications ==
Qudsia Tahseen has published a good number of research papers in leading international journals of the field viz., Nematology, Journal of Nematology, Hydrobiologia etc.

- Ather Hussain and Qudsia Tahseen (2015) Nematodes as Environmental Indicators of Keoladeo National Park. ISBN 978-3-659-67319-1
- Rehmat Jehan and Qudsia Tahseen (2018) Diversity of Order Rhabditida in an Indian State ISBN 978-613-7-03270-1
