= Central University of Himachal Pradesh =

University in Himachal Pradesh, India

- Motto: Neti Neti Charaiveti Charaiveti
- Type: central research university
- Established: 2009; 17 years ago
- Accreditation: MHRD; NAAC
- Academic affiliations: UGC; AICTE; AIU
- Chancellor: Harmohinder Singh Bedi
- Vice-Chancellor: Sat Prakash Bansal
- Visitor: President of India
- Location: Dharamsala, Himachal Pradesh, India; 32°13′28″N 76°09′24″E
- Campus: Urban
- Website: cuhimachal.ac.in

Central University of Himachal Pradesh (CUHP and CU Himachal) is a central research university located in Dharamsala, Himachal Pradesh, India. It is operating from a temporary campus at Shahpurand Dehra Gopipur, with two small campuses for few subjects such as Department of Political Science, History, Economics in Sapt Sindhu Parisar, Kangra district. Construction of two permanent campuses is pending, at Dehra and Dharamsala. The university was founded in 2009 as a result of the government's policy to establish Central Universities in each of the states that do not already have a central university. The Central University of Himachal Pradesh is established under the Central Universities Act 2009 (No. 25 of 2009) enacted by the Parliament. The Central University of Himachal Pradesh (CUHP) in Dharamshala has received an "A+" rating from the National Assessment and Accreditation Council (NAAC). This makes CUHP the first institution in Himachal Pradesh to achieve this distinction. It has its jurisdiction over entire state of Himachal Pradesh.

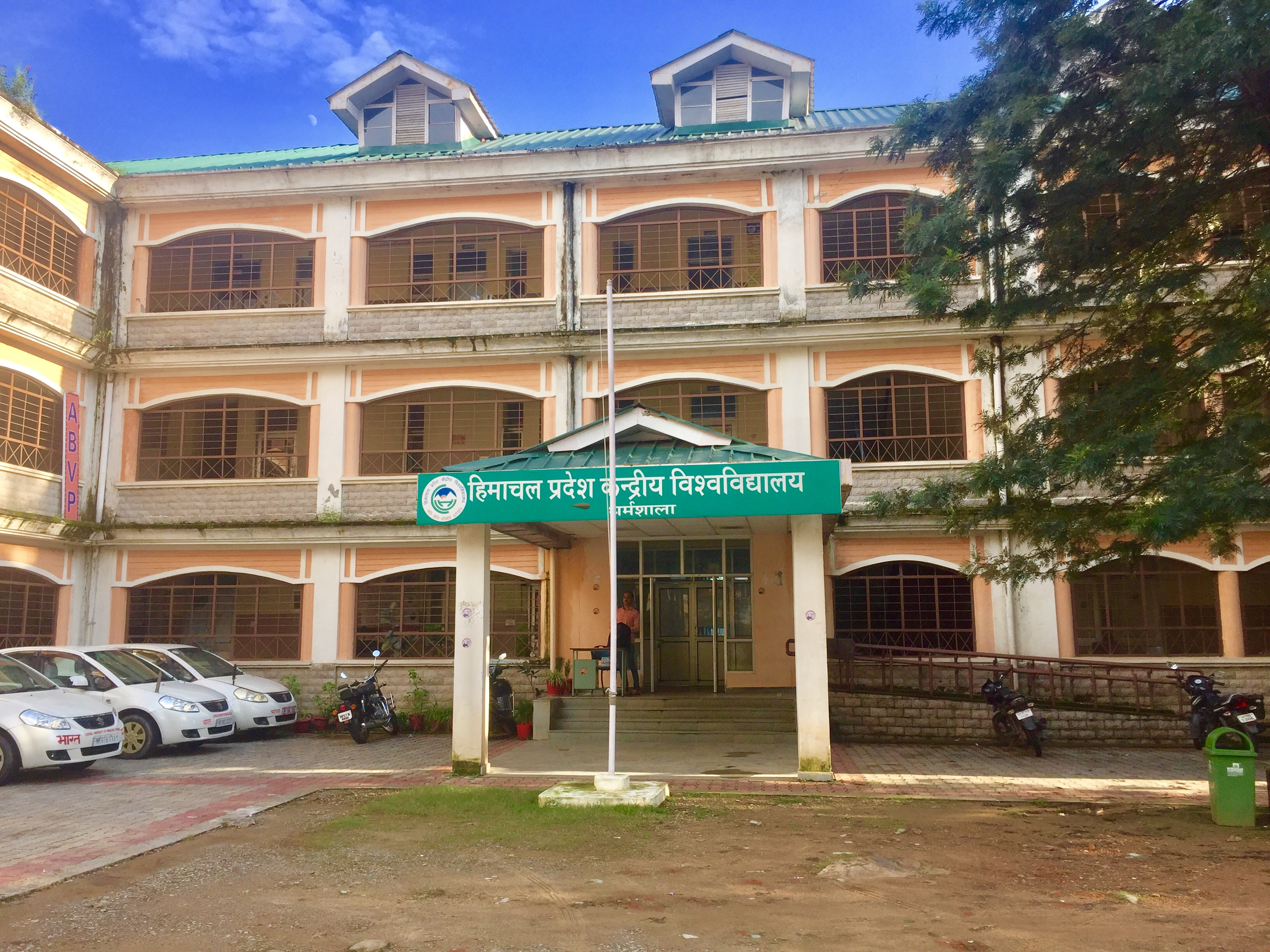
Central University of Himachal Pradesh, Dharamshala

== History ==
Prime Minister Manmohan Singh, in his address to the nation on 15 August 2007, announced the establishment of a Central University in each of the states that did not already have a central university. Subsequently, the Planning Commission provided for the establishment of 16 new Central Universities according to the Central Universities Act 2009 (No. 25 of 2009) of the Indian Parliament. The act received presidential assent on 20 March 2009 and provided for the establishment of the Central University of Himachal Pradesh, amongst others. Furqan Qamar, appointed as the first Vice-Chancellor of University.

== Organisation and administration ==
The President of India is the Visitor of the University. The Chancellor is the ceremonial head of the university while the executive powers rest with the Vice-chancellor. The Court, the Executive Council, the Academic Council, the Board of studies and the Finance Committee are the administrative authorities of the University.

The University Court is the supreme authority of the University and has the power to review, the broad policies and programmes of the University and to suggest measures for the improvement and development of the University. The Executive Council is the highest executive body of the University. The Academic Council is the highest academic body of the University and is responsible for the co-ordination and exercising general supervision over the academic policies of the University. It has the right to advise the Executive Council on all academic matters. The Finance Committee is responsible for recommending financial policies, goals, and budgets.
