= Deeba Salim Irfan =

Indian-born United Arab Emirates author, poet, entrepreneur (born 1969)

- Irfan at book launch for Urma, Dubai
- Occupation: Novelist
- Children: 3

Deeba Salim Irfan is an Indian writer, poet and a brand expert. Her debut novel was URMA.

== Career ==
She has been on several global literary conferences and jury sessions including iWrite’19 a competition for aspiring writers at Jaipur Book Mark, (Jaipur Literature Festival) and Abu Dhabi Book Fair. She was the chairperson of the advisory board of the Young Author Awards for traditionally published authors under the age of 30. She hosts a Meetup Group – TheWriteScene in Dubai, to assist fellow writers with their work.
