= Jaunpuri =

Jaunpuri may refer to:

- Jaunpuri (raga), in Indian classical music
- Jaunpuri dialect (Garhwal), a dialect of Garhwali spoken in Jaunpur, Uttarakhand
- a dialect of Bhojpuri, spoken in Jaunpur, Uttar Pradesh
- of or related to Jaunpur

== People with the name ==
- Muhammad Jaunpuri (1443–1505), Sufi saint and Mahdi claimant
- Mulla Mahmud Jaunpuri (1606–1651), natural philosopher
- Karamat Ali Jaunpuri (1800-1873), Islamic scholar
- Hafiz Ahmad Jaunpuri (1834-1899), Islamic scholar
- Abdul Awwal Jaunpuri (1867–1921), Islamic scholar
- Abdur Rab Jaunpuri (1875–1935), Islamic scholar
- Majid Ali Jaunpuri (died 1935), Islamic scholar
- Syed Rashid Ahmed Jaunpuri (1889–2001), Sufi saint
- Muhammad Yunus Jaunpuri (1937–2017), Islamic scholar
