= Karamat Ali Jaunpuri =

Indian Islamic scholar (1800–1873)

Shah Karamat Ali Jaunpuri Hādi-e-Zamān

Personal life
- Born: Muhammad Ali Jaunpuri; June 12, 1800 CE (18 Muharram 1215 AH) Jaunpur, Oudh State
- Died: May 30, 1873 (aged 72) (3 Rabi' al-Thani 1290 AH) Rangpur, Bengal Presidency
- Resting place: Karamatia Mazar, Munshipara, Rangpur
- Children: Hafiz Ahmad Jaunpuri; Abdul Awwal Jaunpuri
- Occupation: Theologian and social reformer
- Relatives: Abdur Jaunpuri (grandson); Abdul Jaunpuri (grandson); Rashid Jaunpuri (grandson); Taj Hashmi (great-grandson)

Religious life
- Religion: Islam
- Denomination: Sunni
- Jurisprudence: Hanafi
- Creed: Maturidi
- Movement: Taiyuni

Muslim leader
- Teacher: Shah Abdul Aziz; Shah Ismail Dehlvi
- Predecessor: Syed Ahmad Shaheed
- Successor: Hafiz Ahmad Jaunpuri
- Disciples: Mohammad Abu Bakr Siddique Hafiz Ahmad Jaunpuri Azimuddin Hanafi
- Students: Syed Ameer Ali
- Influenced by: Shah Waliullah
- Influenced: Muhammad Ishaq Abdul Latif Chowdhury Fultali

Karāmat ʿAlī Jaunpūrī (Urdu: کرامت علی جونپوری, Bengali: কারামত আলী জৌনপুরী; 12 June 1800 – 30 May 1873), born as Muḥammad ʿAlī Jaunpūrī, was a nineteenth-century Indian Muslim social reformer and founder of the Taiyuni movement. He played a major role in propagating to the masses of Bengal and Assam via public sermons, and wrote over forty books. Syed Ameer Ali is one of his notable students.

== Early life and family ==
Muhammad Ali Jaunpuri was born in the neighbourhood of Mulla Tola in Jaunpur in Uttar Pradesh in India on 18 Muharram 1215 A. H. (12 June 1800 CE). His father, Abu Ibrahim Shaykh Muhammad Imam Bakhsh, was the only son of Shaykh Jarullah and Musammat Jamila Bibi. Bakhsh was a student of Shah Abdul Aziz and was employed as a sheristadar at the Jaunpur Collectorate. Jaunpuri's mother, Musammat Bati Bibi, was the daughter of Shaykh Lutf-e-Ali. His younger brother, Shah Rab Ali Jaunpuri, was a faqir and khalifah of Syed Ahmad Shaheed.

It is said that the name Karamat was later prefixed to his name as people started to notice his karamat. From his own books, it can be seen that he used to refer to himself as simply 'Ali Jaunpuri' or 'Ali Jaunpuri better known as Karamat Ali'.

== Education ==
Jaunpuri's early education in Arabic and Persian began with his father, and he later started Hadith studies and other Islamic studies under Qudratullah Radaulvi and Ahmadullah Anami. He studied reasoning with Ahmad Ali Abbasi Chiraiyakoti and was taught tajweed and Qur'an by Qari Sayyid Ibrahim Madani and Qari Sayyid Muhammad Iskandarani, eventually mastering all seven qira'at. Jaunpuri was also taught Nastaliq and Tughra calligraphy by Hafiz Abdul Ghani to such a degree that it was said he could write Al-Ikhlas with the basmala on a piece of rice and leave space to write his name as well. Apart from this, he also learned the martial arts and wrestling and the art of running sticks and knots from expert art teachers. Jaunpuri studied fiqh under Shah Abdul Aziz and Shah Ismail Dehlvi. He was also a student of Sakhawat Ali Jaunpuri (d. 1854).

At the age of eighteen, Jaunpuri became interested in tasawwuf. After taking his father's permission, Jaunpuri pledged bay'ah to Sayyid Ahmad of Raebareli, who was the founder of the Tariqah-e-Muhammadiya movement. On the very first week of service, Sayyid Ahmad instructed him to get involved in the work of guidance and bestowed the Khilafah (succession) letter with the spiritual genealogy through Shah Ismail Dehlvi. (Note: This letter is still preserved in his family. A copy is listed at the end of the book "Tazkira Maulana Karamat Ali Jaunpuri" by Mujeebullah Nadvi.)

== Activism in Jaunpur ==
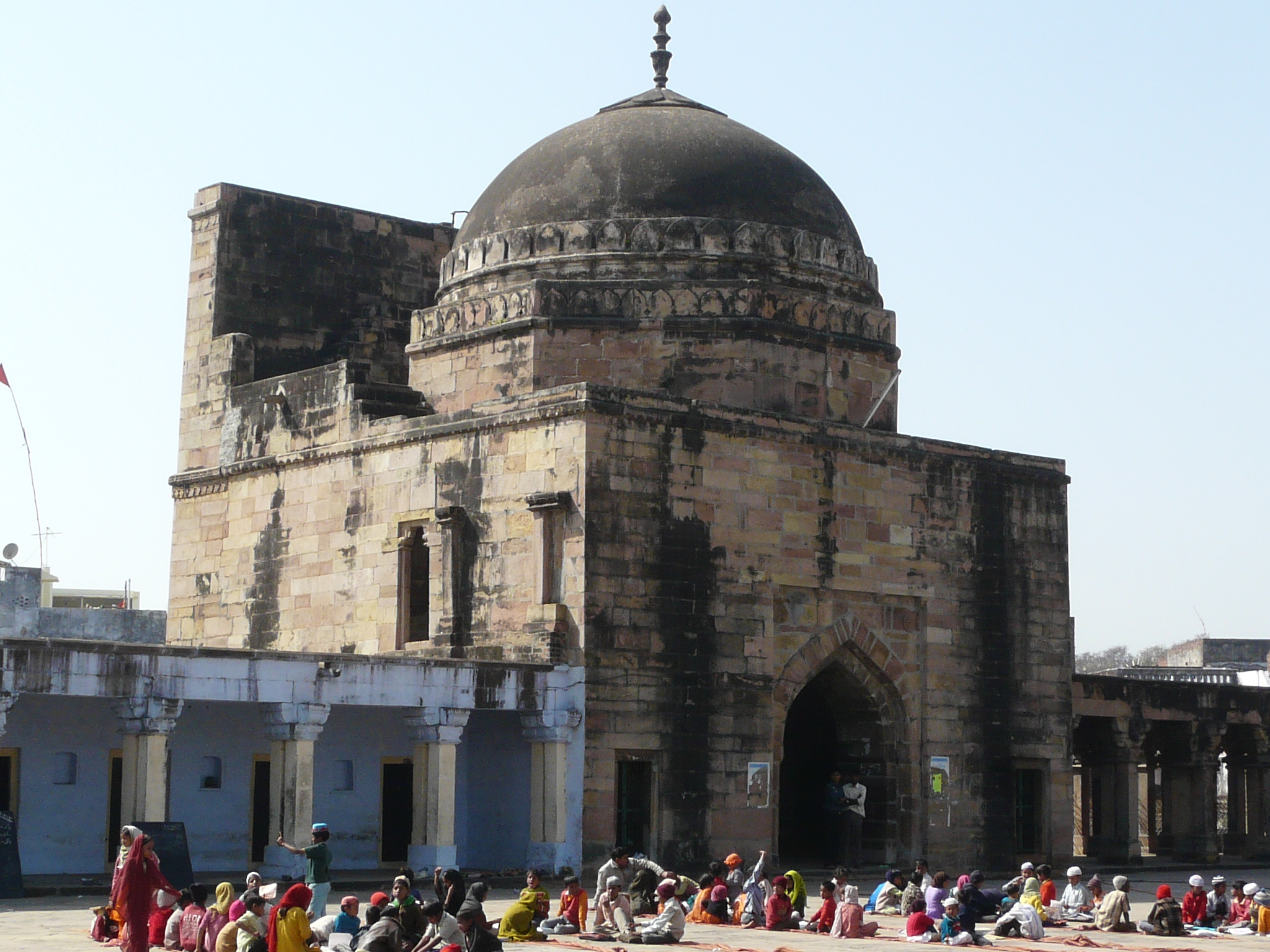
The Jama Mosque was commissioned by Sultan Ibrahim Shah Sharqi of the independent Jaunpur Sultanate in 1470.

His religious activities were spread across northern India in places like Jaunpur, Azamgarh, Sultanpur, Ghazipur and Faizabad. At that time, there was no daytime adhan in Jaunpur, it could only be heard with the rising and setting of the sun. He reformed this un-Islamic ritual and with great effort issued adhan in mosques. There were also concerns behind the management of the historic Jama Mosque, Jaunpur. Instead of adhan and prayers, the mosque was used for worldly gatherings like baraat, clubbing and marriage ceremonies regardless of religion. Cattle were also tied in some parts of the Jamia Masjid. It continued for many years after until Jaunpuri managed to re-establish the five daily prayers at the mosque. Similarly, after Jamia Masjid Jaunpur, he started a series of Friday sermons which continued for many years after his death. Due to his preaching efforts, attempts were made to kill him several times but he escaped due to his skill in martial arts. He also established Madrasa Hanafia and Madrasat-ul-Quran in Jaunpur for the publication of religious knowledge. The first teacher of Madrasa Hanafia was Abdul Haleem Farangi Mohali (father of Abdul Hai Lucknowi).

== Migration to Bengal ==
Under Sayyid Ahmad's instruction in 1822, Jaunpuri began preaching to the Muslim masses in Bengal and Assam. He played an important role in Arabic, Urdu and Islamic studies in the country. Starting in Calcutta, he travelled to various places including Dhaka, Mymensingh, Dinajpur, Faridpur, Noakhali, Chittagong, Goalpara, Dhubri, Kamrup and Rangpur.

For most of Karamat Ali Jaunpuri's career, he had to sail in Bengal and Assam for religious activities. For this reason, he established a travelling madrasa within a large boat. His students lived in the boat and Jaunpuri used to bear their expenses and teach them there.

=== Political views ===
The Tariqah-i-Muhammadiya split into two in 1867 with Jaunpuri leading a faction which came to be known as the Taiyunis. The Taiyunis considered cooperating with the British authorities as the more ideal option rather than rebelling. Karamat Ali Jaunpuri and the Taiyunis were also opponents of Haji Shariatullah's Faraizi movement which declared British India as a Dar al-Harb (house of war) and discarded the Friday prayer and Eid prayers. Instead, he issued a fatwa declaring the colonised territory as a Dar al-Aman as the British government allowed freedom of religion. His fatwa was used by other Muslim scholars as well as Muslim modernists of the subcontinent like Nawab Abdul Latif and later Syed Ahmad Khan to justify their loyalty and cooperation to the British Empire. During his lifetime, Jaunpuri engaged in debate with the Faraizis, most prominently Abdul Jabbar Faraizi. The first debate regarding the Friday prayer was held in Barisal in 1867, and this was followed up by a debate in 1879 by his son Hafiz Ahmad Jaunpuri in Madaripur. Over five thousand people attended the latter event and it was dubbed by Nabinchandra Sen as the Battle of Jumuʿah.

== Personal life ==
Karamat Ali Jaunpuri married four times. He first married a lady of Jaunpur but she died. He married two women in Noakhali who also died during his lifetime. His fourth wife, originally from North India, settled in Rangpur with him.

== Works ==
Jaunpuri wrote roughly 46 books. 19 of them were compiled into the three-volume Zakhira-e-Karamat book. The remaining works are scarce. An incomplete list of his works:

- Miftahul Jannat
- Zeenat al-Musalli
- Zeenat al-Qari
- Sharh-e-Hindi Jazari
- Kawkab-e-Durri
- Tarjama-e-Shamail-e-Tirmizi
- Tarjama-e-Mishkat Sharif
- Aqaid-e-Haqqa
- Tazkiratul Aqaid
- Mafizul Huruf
- Qawl ath-Thabit
- Maqami al-Mubtadieen
- Haqq al-Yaqin
- Bay'at-o-Tauba
- Qawl al-Amin
- Murad al-Murideen
- Qawl al-Haq
- Merat al-Haq
- Imtinan al-Qulub
- Mokashifat-e-Rahmat
- Mulakkhas
- Barahin Qat'iyyah fi Mawlud Khayr al-Bariyyah
- Farz-e-Aam
- Hujjat-e-Kateya
- Nur al-Husa
- Zad at-Taqwa
- Kitab-e-Esteqamat
- Nurun Ala Nur
- Rahat-e-Ruh
- Quwwat al-Iman
- Ihqaqul Haqq
- Rafiq as-Salikeen
- Tanweer al-Qulub
- Tazkiyat an-Neswan
- Nasim al-Haramain
- Maulood-e-Khairul Bariyyah
- Keramatul Haramain
- Qurratul Wiyyun
- Resala-e-Faisala
- Okazatul Mumineen
- Fath-e-Bab-e-Sabiyan
- Dawat-e-Majnun

== Death and legacy ==
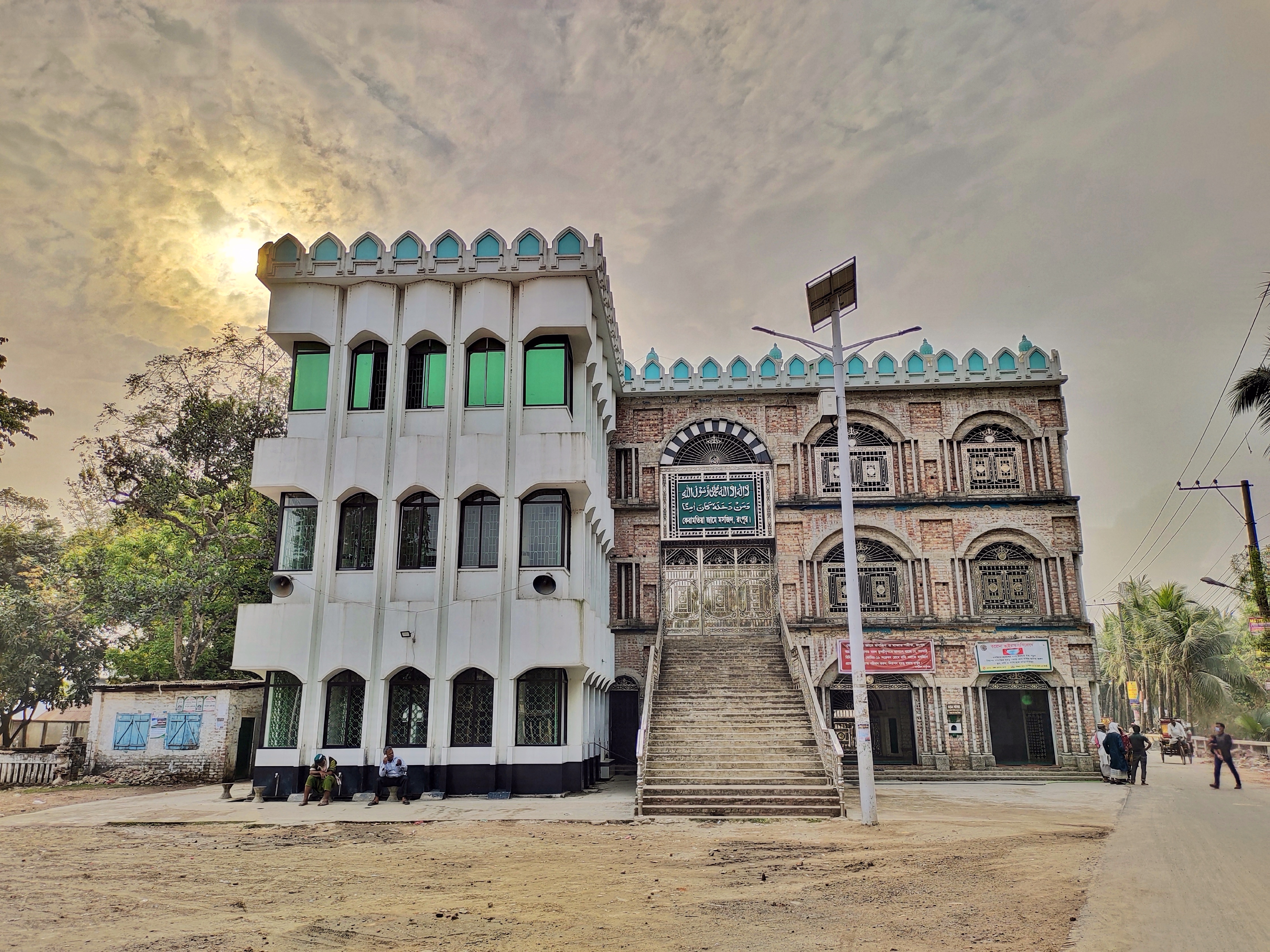
Jaunpuri was buried adjacent to the Keramatia Mosque in Rangpur, which is named after him.

During his travels in Rangpur in 1873, Jaunpuri fell ill and subsequently died on 2 Rabi' al-Thani 1290 AH (30 May 1873 CE). He was buried near the Munshipara Jame Mosque in Rangpur.

Jaunpuri left behind 14 children. Two of his sons, Hafiz Ahmad Jaunpuri and Abdul Awwal Jaunpuri gained prominence in Bengal later on.

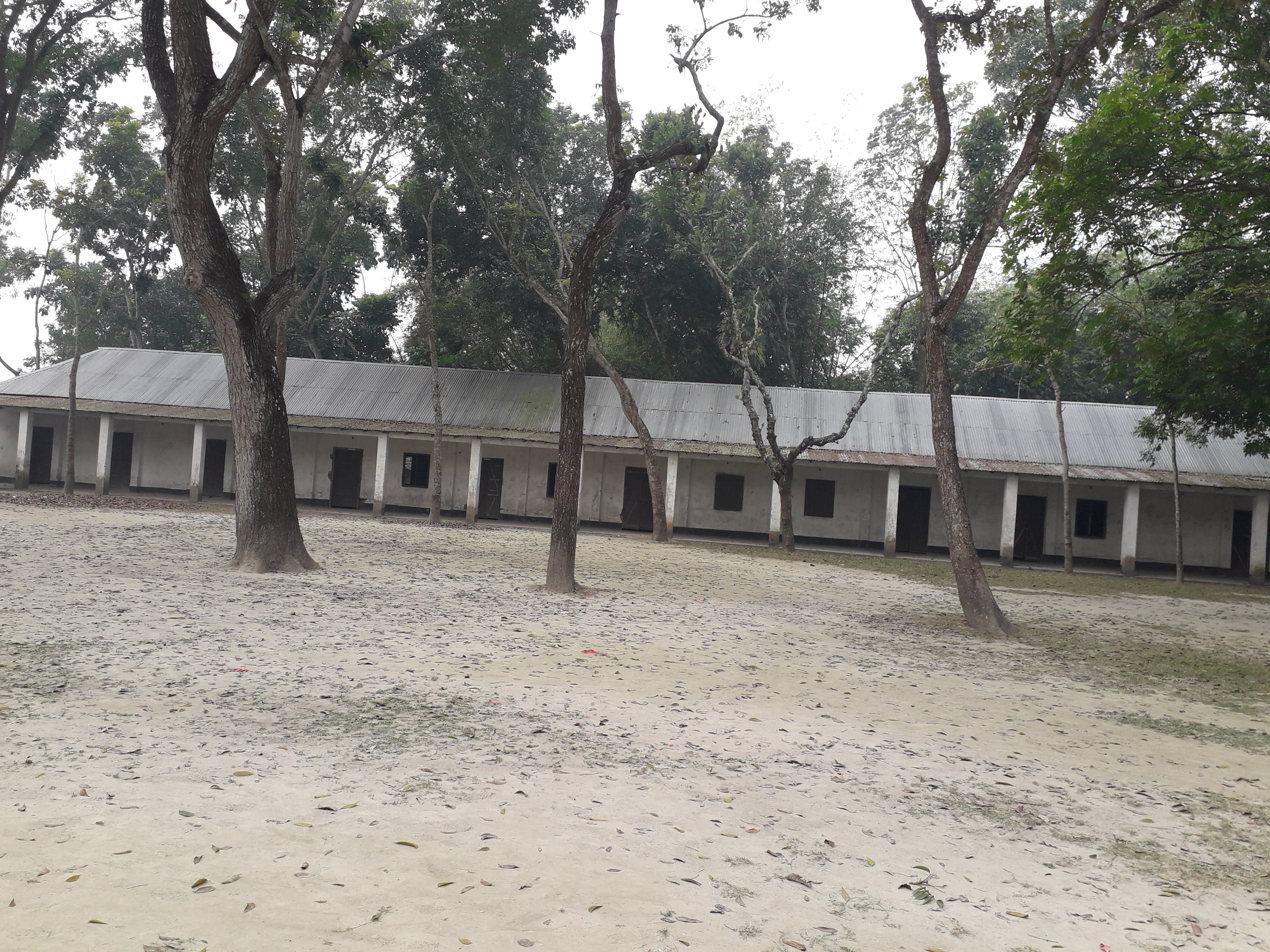
Pabitrajhar Karamatia Madrasa

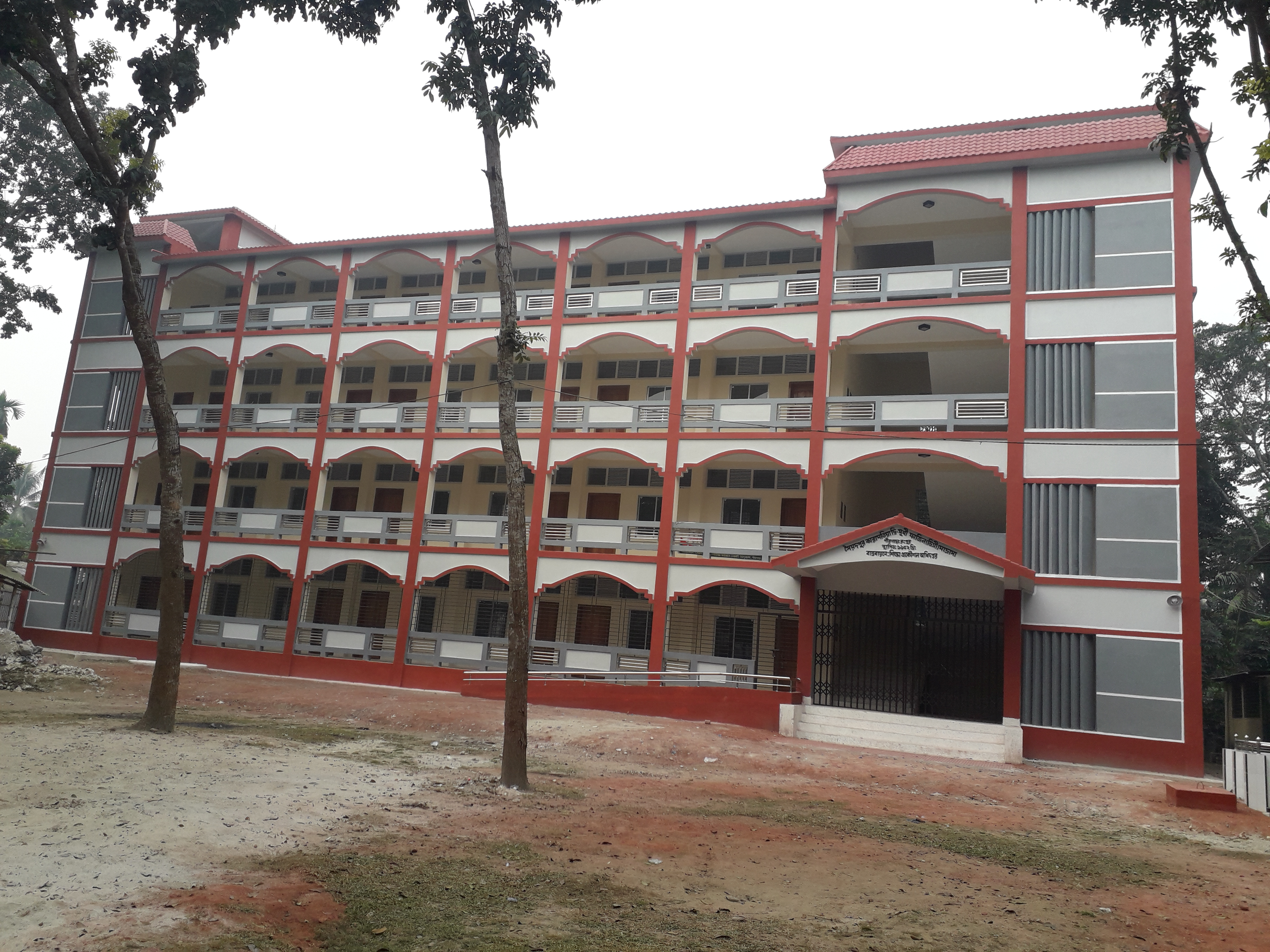
Sayedpur Karamatia Madrasa

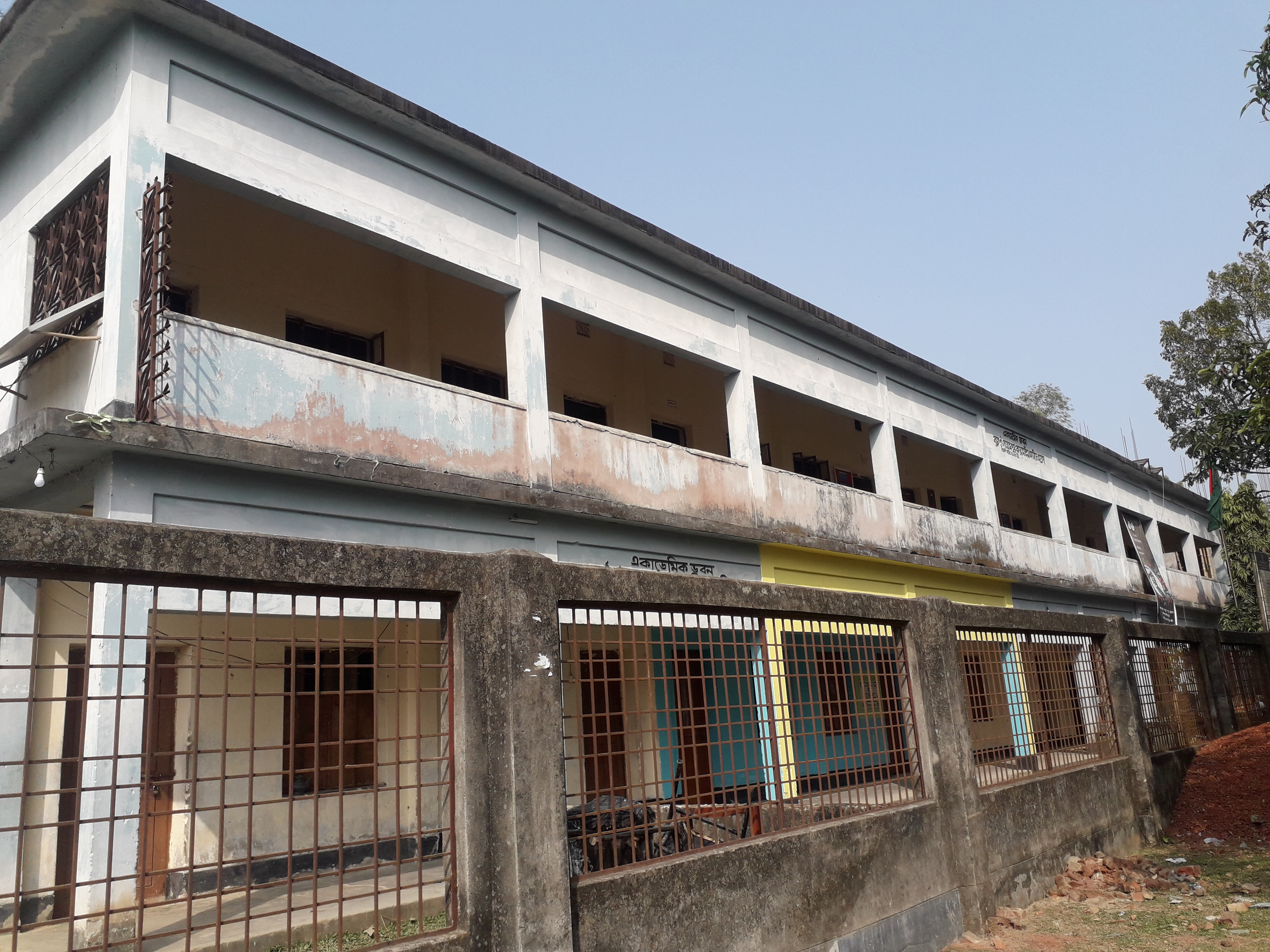
Buzurg Santoshpur Karamatia Madrasa

=== Disciples ===
Jaunpuri had hundreds of spiritual successors (khalifas) including:

- Hafiz Ahmad Jaunpuri (1834–1899)
- Mohammad Abu Bakr Siddique of Furfura Darbar Sharif (1865–1943)
- Qari Muhammad Jawed Bakht of Chhatak, Sunamganj
- Nadiruzzaman Bhuiyan of Kaliganj, Gazipur
- Khwaja Tamizuddin of Cachar (d. 1899)
- Munshi Azimuddin Hanafi of Karimganj, Kishoreganj (1838–1922)
- Qazi Muhammad Sami of Rangpur
- Ashraf Ali Majumdar of Barsala, Sylhet (1817–1883)
- Moulvi Qudratullah of Dhaka
- Zulqad Ali of Sivasagar, Assam (1796–1891)
- Maulvi Sarfaraz Ali of Delhi (fl. 1857)
- Sayyid Muhammad Shah of Rampur (d. 1920)

=== Eponyms ===
Institutions named after him include:

- Noakhali Karamatia Kamil Madrasa (1850), Noakhali
- Keramatia Mosque and Mazar (1860s), Rangpur City
- Char Fasson Karamatia Kamil Madrasa (1945), Char Fasson, Bhola Island
- Buzurg Santoshpur Karamatia Fazil Madrasa (1948), Mithapukur, Rangpur
- Pabitrajhar Karamatia Fazil Madrasa (1950), Pirgacha, Rangpur
- Sayedpur Karamatia Fazil Madrasa (1952), Pirgacha, Rangpur
- Bara Rangpur Karamatia Kamil Madrasa (1959), Rangpur City
