= Sayedpur Karamatia Madrasa =

Madrasa in Rangpur, Bangladesh

Sayedpur Karamatia Madrasah
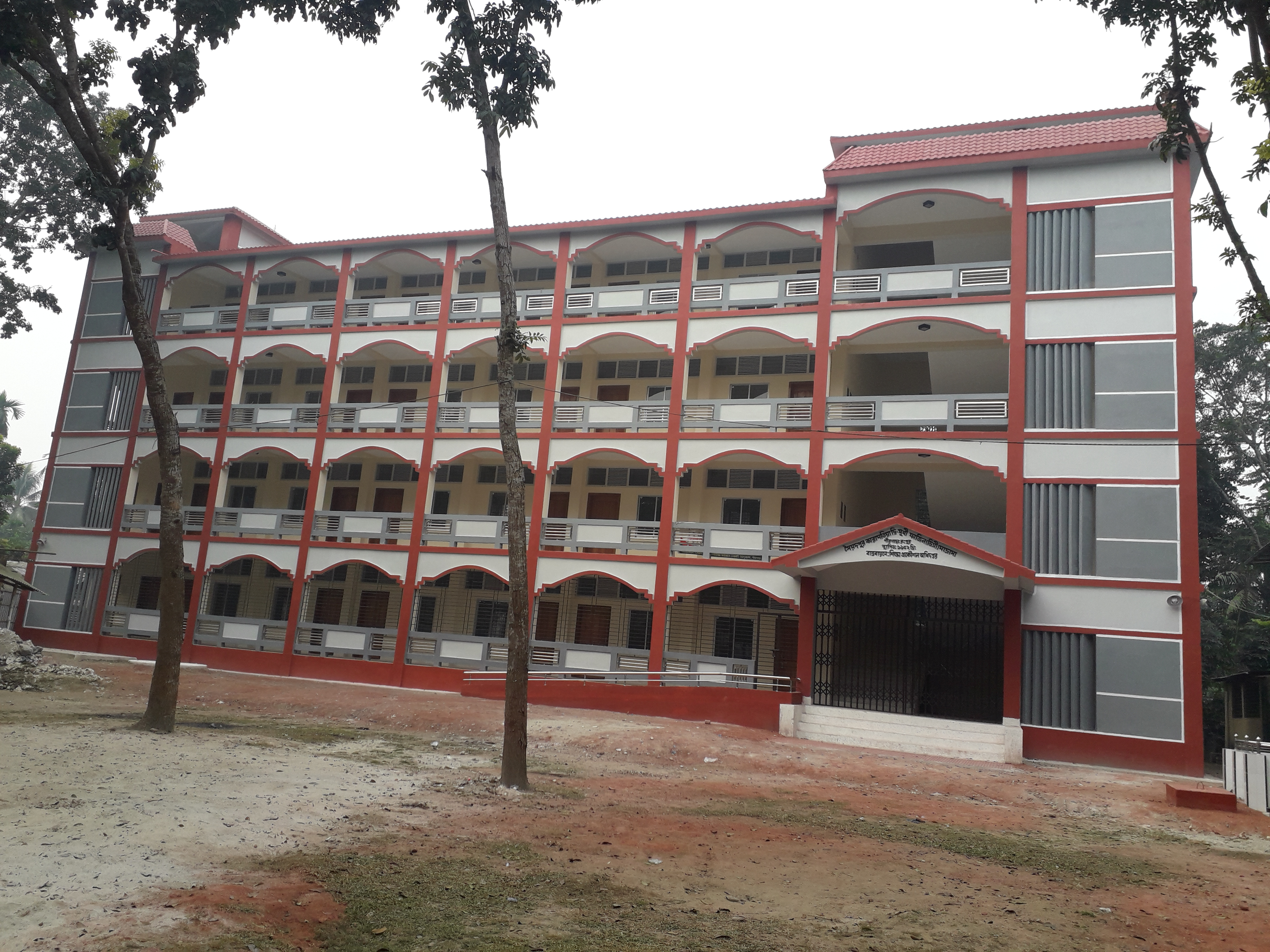
- Academic building

Location
- Sayedpur, Parul Union, Pirgacha Upazila, Rangpur District; Bangladesh

Information
- Religious affiliation(s): Sunni (Hanafi)
- Established: 1 November 1952; 72 years ago
- Founder: Alhaj Muhammad Sulaiman Miah Toran
- Language: Bengali
- Website: 127734.ebmeb.gov.bd

Sayedpur Karamatia Bilateral Fazil Madrasah (Arabic: المدرسة الفاضلية الكرامتية بِسيّدفور, Bengali: সৈয়দপুর কারামতিয়া দ্বি-মুখী ফাজিল মাদ্রাসা) is a madrasa located in Pirgacha, Rangpur District, Bangladesh.

== History ==
The institution was first established as a dakhil madrasa in November 1952 by Alhaj Muhammad Sulaiman Miah Toran. It was named after Karamat Ali Jaunpuri, a 19th-century Islamic scholar celebrated for reformist activities in Bengal who died in Rangpur in 1873. Three years after its establishment, the madrasa was given fazil status on 6 January 1955.

== Infrastructure ==
The madrasa is composed of 6 buildings, which include one administrative building, three academic buildings, two science buildings and one mosque. It includes facilities such as a computer lab and library. The school premises is approximately 1.75 acres, with a total of 11.19 acres of land.

== Gallery ==
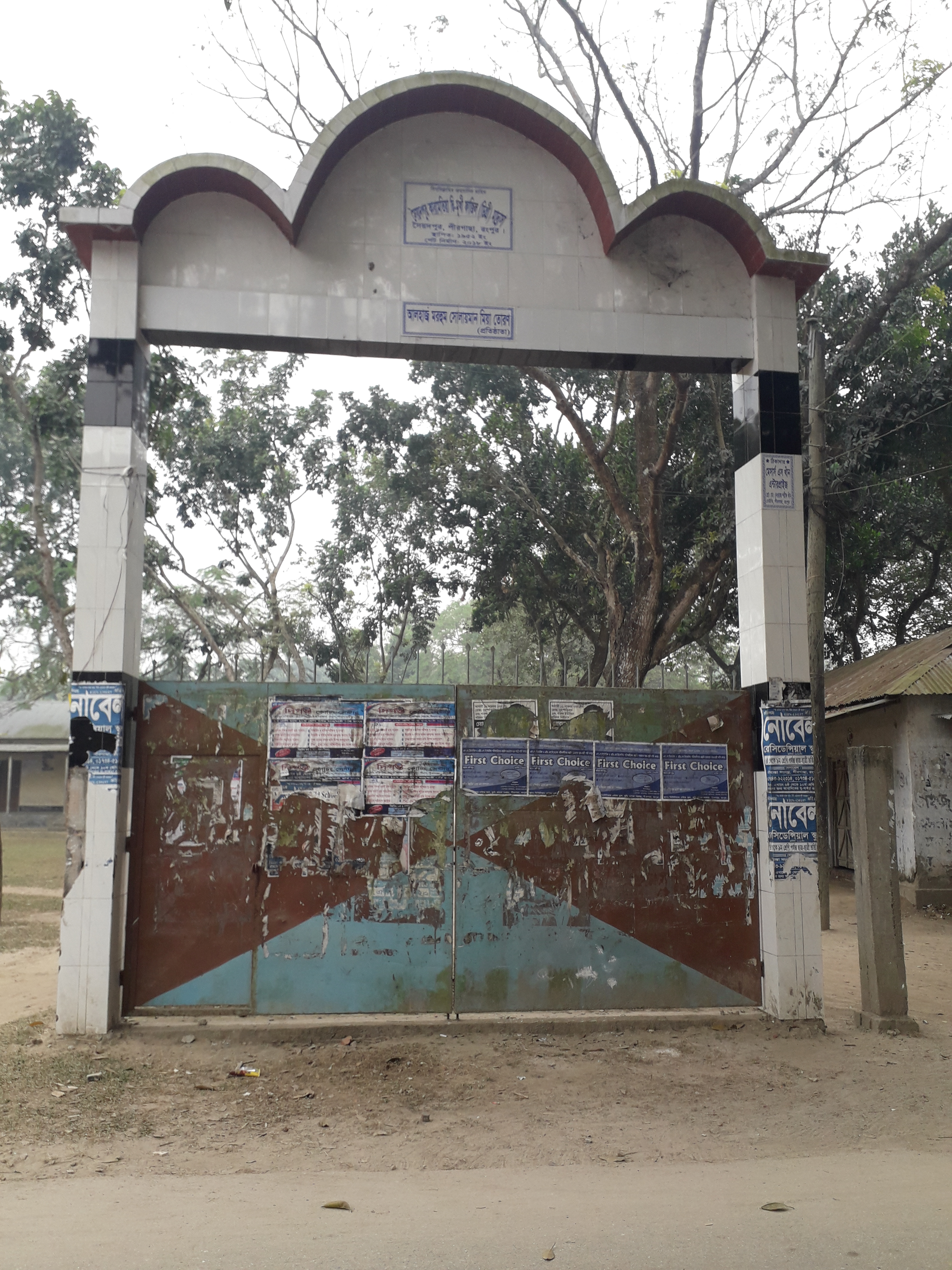
Madrasa gate

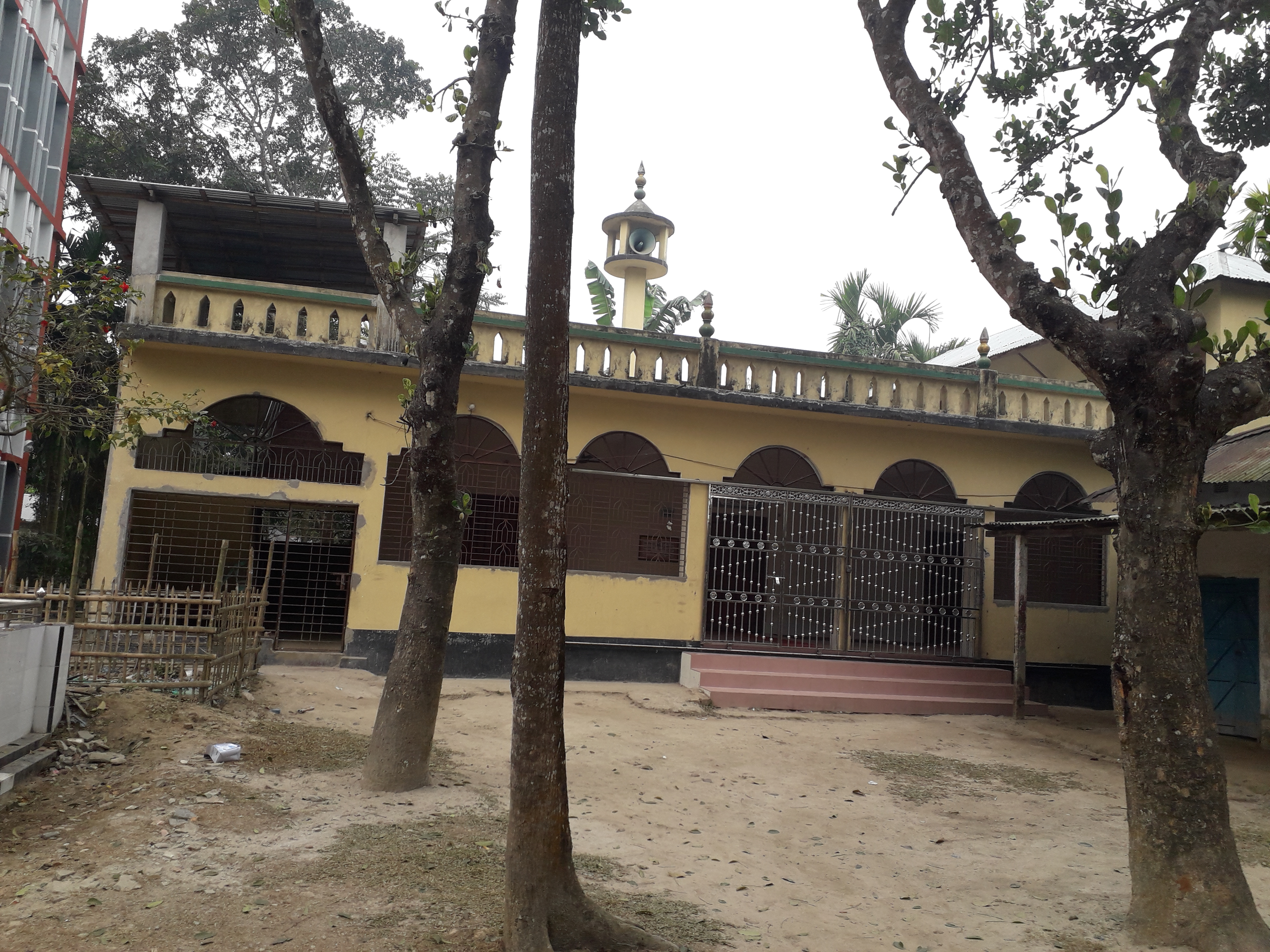
Madrasa mosque
