= Abdul Batin Jaunpuri =

Indian Islamic scholar (1900–1973)

Mawlana Abdul Batin Jaunpuri

Personal life
- Born: 1900 Jaunpur, North-Western Provinces
- Died: 1973 (aged 72–73) Dacca, Bangladesh
- Resting place: Mazar Road, Gabtali, Dacca
- Parents: Abdul Awwal Jaunpuri (father); Fakhira Bibi (mother)
- Occupation: Theologian, author
- Relatives: Karamat Ali Jaunpuri (grandfather); Hafiz Ahmad Jaunpuri (uncle); Rashid Ahmad Jaunpuri (cousin); Abdur Rab Jaunpuri (cousin)

Religious life
- Religion: Islam
- Denomination: Sunni
- Jurisprudence: Hanafi
- Movement: Taiyuni

Muslim leader
- Teacher: Abdul Awwal Jaunpuri
- Influenced by: Karamat Ali Jaunpuri

ʿAbd al-Bāṭin Jaunpūrī (Urdu: عبد الباطن جونپوری, Bengali: আব্দুল বাতেন জৌনপুরী; 1900–1973), also known as Abdul Baten Siddiqi, was an Indian Muslim scholar, religious preacher, educationist. He authored many of the biographies of the leaders of the Taiyuni movement centred in Bengal. He led a peasant movement in Gafargaon, Mymensingh, which eventually led to the establishment of Batinia Madrasa.

== Early life and family ==
Abdul Batin Jaunpuri was born in 1900 to Abdul Awwal Jaunpuri and Fakhira Bibi in the Mulla Tola neighbourhood of Jaunpur located in British India's North-Western Provinces. He belonged to an Indian Muslim family that traced their ancestry to Caliph Abu Bakr and the family often frequented Bengal where they had a large following. His father was a contributor of Islamic literature, authoring 121 books, and founded the Madrasa-i-Hammadia in Armanitola. Jaunpuri's grandfather, Karamat Ali Jaunpuri, had migrated from Jaunpur in North India with the intention of reforming the Muslims of Bengal. His great-grandfather, Abu Ibrahim Shaykh Muhammad Imam Bakhsh was a student of Shah Abdul Aziz and a son of Shaykh Jarullah. Many of his family members were Islamic scholars, for example, his uncle Hafiz Ahmad Jaunpuri and cousins Abdur Rab Jaunpuri and Rashid Ahmad Jaunpuri.

== Later life ==
Jaunpuri's education began in his hometown, and was followed by studying at various Islamic institutions across India. After completing his studies, Jaunpuri settled in Bengal, the centre of the Taiyuni movement founded by his grandfather where he acquired a large following. He actively preached against irreligion, shirk and bid'ah.

Jaunpuri was known to have authored numerous books in Urdu, including:

1. Sīrat-e-Mawlānā Karāmat ʿAlī Jaunpūrī (Asrar-e-Karimi Press, Allahabad, 1949)
2. Sīrat-e-Mawlānā ʿAbd al-Awwal Jaunpūrī (co-authored by Mawlana Abul Bashar, Asrar-e-Karimi Press, 1950)
3. Sīrat-e-Mawlānā Ḥāfiẓ Aḥmad Jaunpūrī
4. ʿUlūm-e-ʿArab Ghair Muslimon Ki Nazar Mein (Anjuman-i Taraqqi-i Urdu, Urdu Bazaar, Delhi, 1954)
5. Islām Talwār Se Nahīn Phailā (Kutubkhana-i Anjuman-i Taraqqi-i Urdu, Delhi, 1955)
6. Kashkol-e-Bāṭin (Kutubkhana-i Anjuman-i Taraqqi-i Urdu, Delhi, 1961)
7. Irshād as-Sālikīn (Kutubkhana-i Anjuman-i Taraqqi-i Urdu, Delhi, 1962)

== Death ==
Abdul Batin Jaunpuri died in 1973 in Dacca, Bangladesh. He was buried in Gabtali Mazar Road, Dacca.
