= Pabitrajhar Karamatia Madrasa =

Madrasa in Rangpur, Bangladesh

Pabitrajhar Karamatia Madrasah
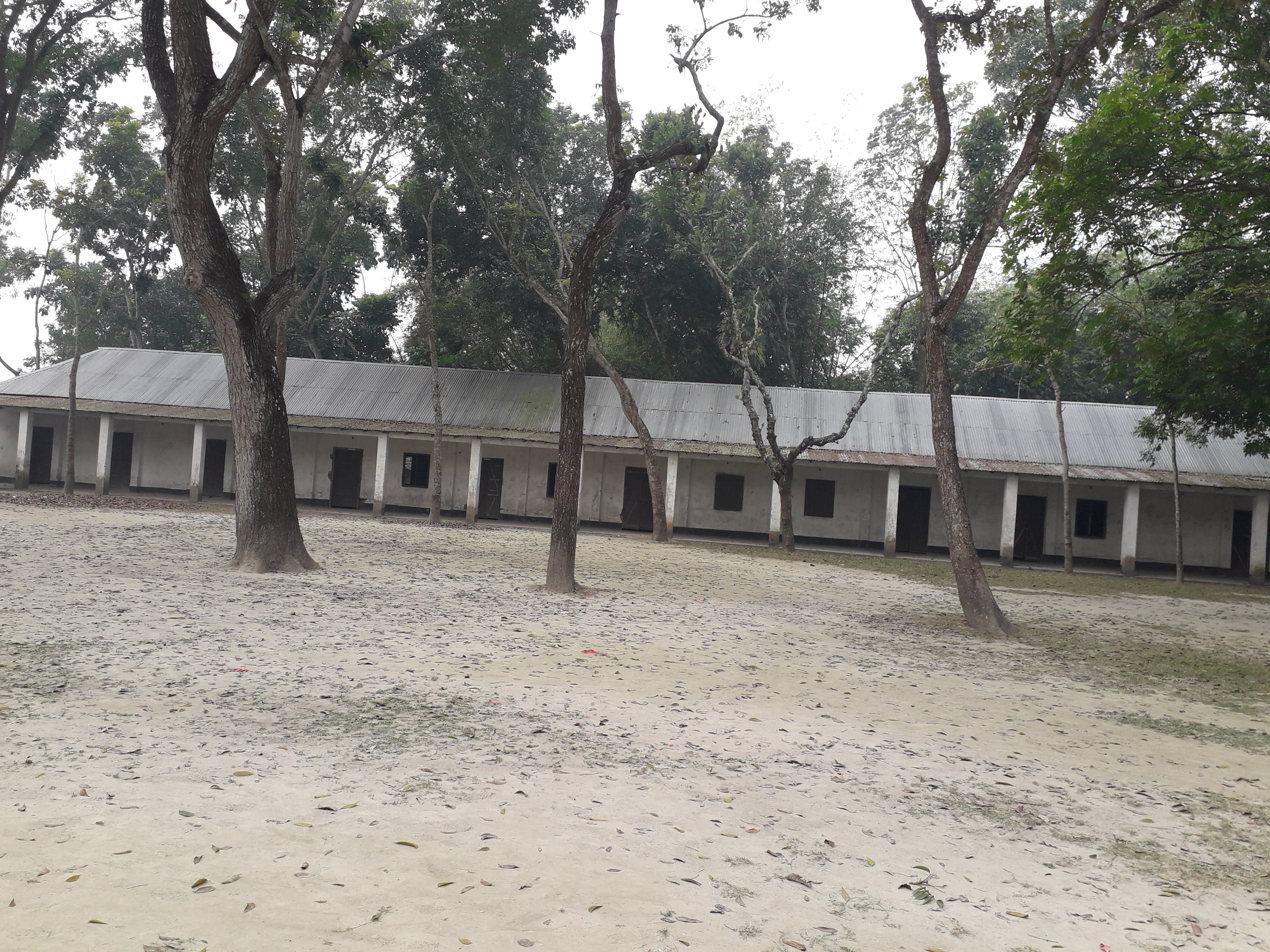
- Academic building

Location
- Pabitrajhar, Pirgacha Union, Pirgacha Upazila, Rangpur District; Bangladesh

Information
- Religious affiliation(s): Sunni (Hanafi)
- Established: 1950; 75 years ago
- Founder: Akbar Ali Khan
- Principal: Muhammad Abduzzaher
- President: Abdullah Al-Mahmud Milon
- Language: Bengali
- Website: 127732.ebmeb.gov.bd

Pabitrajhar Karamatia Fazil Madrasah (Arabic: المدرسة الفاضلة الكرامتية بِفبترجار, Bengali: পবিত্রঝাড় কারামতিয়া ফাযিল মাদ্রাসা) is a madrasa located in Pirgacha, Rangpur District, Bangladesh.

== History ==
The institution was first established as a furqania madrasa in 1950 by Akbar Ali Khan. It was named after Karamat Ali Jaunpuri, a 19th-century Islamic scholar celebrated for reformist activities in Bengal who died in Rangpur in 1873. Seven years after its establishment, the madrasa was given dakhil status. It attained alim status in 1964 and fazil in 1968.

== Infrastructure ==
The madrasa is composed of 5 buildings, which include one administrative building, three academic buildings and one student accommodation building. It includes facilities such as a computer lab and library. The school premises is approximately 2.95 acres, with a total of 7.22 acres of land.
