= Hafiz Ahmad Jaunpuri =

Indian Islamic scholar (1834–1899)

Ḥāfiẓ Ahmad Jaunpuri

Personal life
- Born: 1834 Calcutta, Bengal Presidency
- Died: January 26, 1899 (aged 64–65) (3 Rabi' al-Thani 1290 AH) Sadarghat, Dacca, Bengal Presidency
- Resting place: Chawkbazar Graveyard, Dhaka
- Parent: Karamat Ali Jaunpuri (father)
- Other name: Ahmed Jaunpuri
- Occupation: Theologian
- Relatives: Abdul Awwal Jaunpuri (brother); Abdul Batin Jaunpuri (nephew); Abdur Rab Jaunpuri (nephew); Rashid Ahmed Jaunpuri (nephew)

Religious life
- Religion: Islam
- Denomination: Sunni
- Jurisprudence: Hanafi
- Movement: Taiyuni

Muslim leader
- Predecessor: Karamat Ali Jaunpuri
- Successor: Abdur Rab Jaunpuri
- Disciples: Abdur Rab Jaunpuri Abu Yusuf Muhammad Yaqub Badarpuri Abdul Latif Taluqdar Maheruddin Faqir
- Influenced by: Karamat Ali Jaunpuri
- Influenced: Abdul Latif Chowdhury Fultali
- Awards: Multiple testimonials from the British Raj

Ḥāfiẓ Aḥmad Jaunpūrī (1834 – 26 January 1899) was a Bengali Muslim scholar, religious preacher and social worker. As the son and successor of Karamat Ali Jaunpuri, he led the Taiyuni reformist movement in Bengal.

== Early life and family ==
Ahmad Jaunpuri was born in 1834, in the city of Calcutta, Bengal Presidency, to an Indian Muslim family that traced their ancestry to the Arab tribe of Quraysh. He was the 36th direct descendant of Abu Bakr, the first Rashidun caliph. His father, Karamat Ali Jaunpuri, migrated from Jaunpur in North India with the intention of reforming the Muslims of Bengal. Ahmad Jaunpuri's paternal grandfather, Abu Ibrahim Shaykh Muhammad Imam Bakhsh was a student of Shah Abdul Aziz, and his great-grandfather Jarullah was also a shaykh.

Ahmad Jaunpuri completed his memorisation of the Qur'an at an early age, which led to him earning the title of Hafiz. He proceeded to gained more knowledge in Islamic studies in Lucknow and Jaunpur. Many of his family members were also Islamic scholars, for example, his youngest brother Abdul Awwal Jaunpuri.

== Career ==
He established numerous madrasas and an eidgah in Daulatkhan in Bhola Island. He also provided black seed oil treatment to the locals. He represented the Taiyunis at a debate in 1879 in Madaripur against the Faraizis on the topic of the permissibility of the Friday prayer in British India. The Faraizis discarded Friday and Eid prayers as they considered British India as a Dar al-Harb (house of war). Over five thousand people attended this event and it was dubbed by Nabinchandra Sen as the Battle of Jumuʿah. In 1881, Nawab Abdul Latif gained permission for Jaunpuri to lead the Eid prayer at the Maidan of Calcutta. Over 70,000 Muslims joined the congregation, making it the largest gathering in Calcutta. He wrote a book on Hajera.

Jaunpuri had a cordial relationship with Munshi Mohammad Meherullah.

Jaunpuri contributed to the refurbishment of the Ebadullah Mosque in Barisal. On 26 September 1897, Sir Nicholas Beatson-Bell, the district commissioner of Backergunge, organised a conference at the Barisal Zilla School in which Nawab Sirajul Islam and Hafiz Ahmad Jaunpuri delivered speeches on the importance of establishing the Bell Islamia Hostel.

He set off to complete Hajj in 1882. During his stay in the Hejaz, he gained a great reception and was acclaimed as an orator. He brought up his nephew Abdur Rab Jaunpuri, and Abu Yusuf Muhammad Yaqub Badarpuri of Sylhet was also his murid and one of his khalifahs (successors). Another successor was Abdul Latif Taluqdar of Mirsarai.

== Death ==
Hafiz Ahmad Jaunpuri was affected by paralysis and was taken to Dacca for treatment. He died on the way in a boat on 26 January 1899 in Sadarghat. His body was washed in the boat, and his janaza was performed at the Chawkbazar Shahi Mosque in Old Dhaka at the request of his disciple, Sheikh Faiz Bakhsh Kanpuri. He was buried just south of the mosque. His biography was written by his nephew Abdul Batin Jaunpuri.

== Spiritual genealogy ==
1. Prophet Muhammad
2. Abū Bakr
3. Salmān al-Fārisī
4. Al-Qāsim bin Muḥammad
5. Jaʿfar aṣ-Ṣādiq
6. Abū Yazīd Ṭayfūr al-Bisṭāmī
7. Abu al-Ḥasan ʿAlī al-Kharaqānī
8. Abū ʿAlī Faḍl Farmadī
9. Abū Yaʿqūb Yūsuf al-Hamadānī
10. ʿAbd al-Khāliq Ghijdawānī
11. Muḥammad ʿĀrif Riwgarī
12. Maḥmūd Anjīr Faghnawī
13. ʿAzīzān ʿAlī Rāmitānī
14. Sayyid Amīr Kulāl
15. Muḥammad Bābā as-Samāsī
16. Sayyid Bahā ad-Dīn Naqshband
17. Sayyid Mīr ʿAlā ad-Dīn ʿAṭṭār
18. Yaʿqūb Charkhī
19. Khwājah ʿUbaydullāh Aḥrār
20. Khwājah Muḥammad Zāhid Wakhshī
21. Khwājah Darwesh Muḥammad
22. Khwājah Muḥammad Amkingī
23. Khwājah Raḍī ad-Dīn Muḥammad Bāqī Billāh
24. Aḥmad al-Fārūqī as-Sirhindī
25. Sayyid Ādam al-Bannūrī
26. Sayyid ʿAbdullāh Akbarābādī
27. Shāh ʿAbd ar-Raḥīm Dehlawī
28. Shāh Walīullāh Dehlawī
29. Shāh ʿAbd al-ʿAzīz Dehlawī
30. Sayyid Aḥmad Shahīd
31. Karāmat ʿAlī Jaunpūrī
32. Ḥāfiẓ Aḥmad Jaunpūrī

=== Disciples ===
Jaunpuri had numerous spiritual successors (khalifas) including:

- Abdur Rab Jaunpuri (1875–1935)
- মৌলবী আব্দুল গণি শাহ্,ফরিদপুর
- Abdul Latif Taluqdar of Mirsarai (1862–1939)
- Abu Yusuf Muhammad Yaqub Badarpuri of Karimganj, Sylhet district (–1958)
- Maheruddin Faqir of Jhalkathi, Bakerganj district
- Sheikh Faiz Bakhsh of Kanpur, Uttar Pradesh
