= Buzurg Santoshpur Karamatia Madrasa =

Madrasa in Rangpur, Bangladesh

Buzurg Santoshpur Karamatia Madrasah
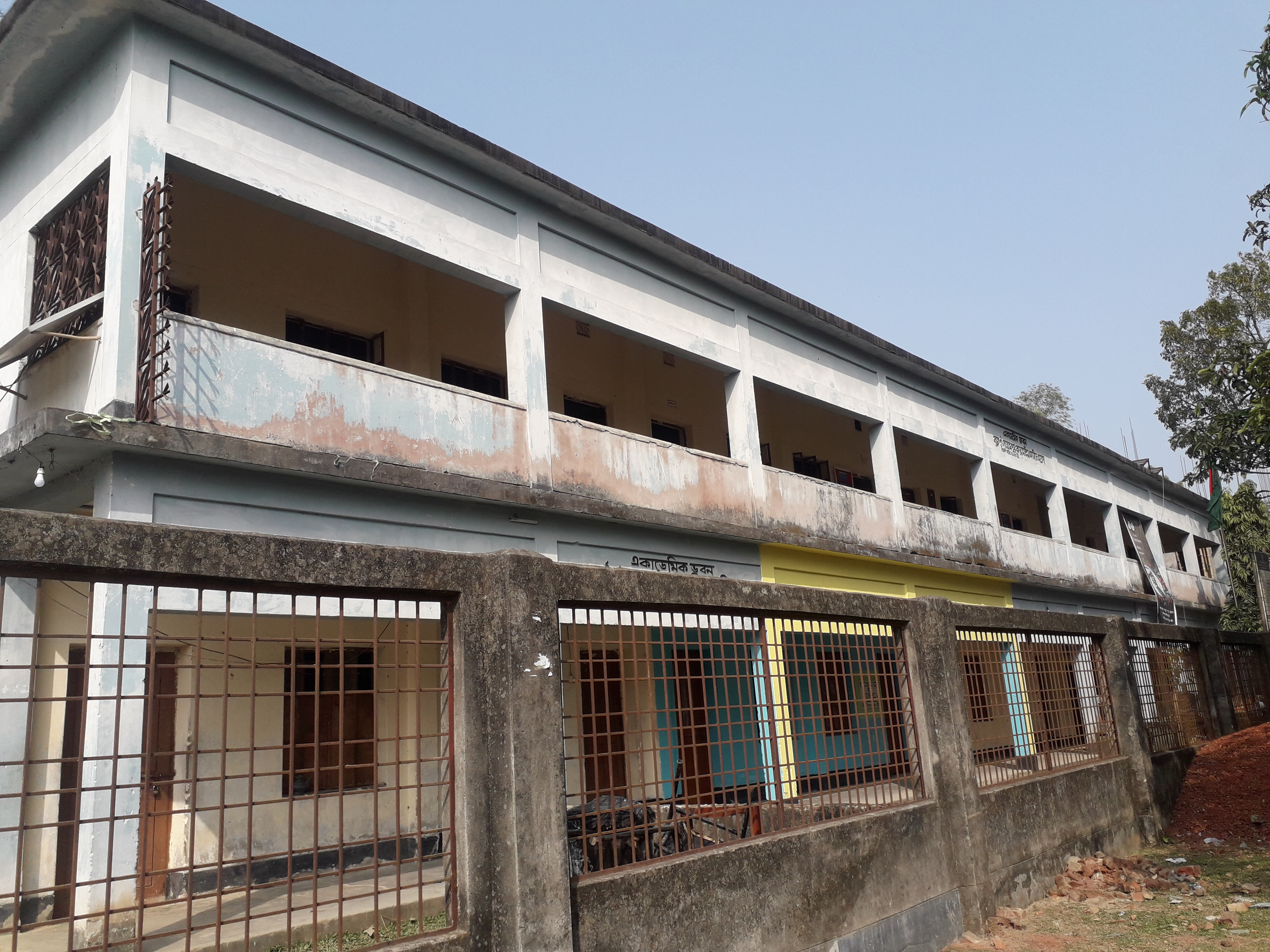
- Academic building
- Santoshpur, Balua Masimpur Union, Mithapukur Upazila, Rangpur District; Bangladesh

Information
- Religious affiliation: Sunni (Hanafi)
- Established: 1948; 77 years ago
- Founder: Pir Mohiuddin
- Principal: AKMA Monem Sarkar
- President: Md Mesbahur Rahman
- Language: Bengali
- Website: 127732.ebmeb.gov.bd

Buzurg Santoshpur Karamatia Fazil Madrasah (Arabic: المدرسة الفاضلة الكرامتية بِبزرك سنتوشفور, Bengali: বুজর্গ সন্তোষপুর কারামতিয়া ফাযিল মাদ্রাসা) is a madrasa located in Mithapukur, Rangpur District, Bangladesh.

== History ==
In 1946, a Muslim missionary from Arabia known as Pir Mohiuddin settled in this area. The local community welcomed his initiative to establish a furqania madrasa in the area, which was completed in 1948. The madrasa was named after Karamat Ali Jaunpuri, a 19th-century Islamic scholar celebrated for reformist activities in Bengal who died in Rangpur in 1873. Twelve years after its establishment, the madrasa was given dakhil status. It attained alim status in 1962 and fazil in 1972.

== Infrastructure ==
The madrasa is composed of one administrative building and academic building. It includes facilities such as a science laboratory, the Sheikh Russel computer laboratory, a library and a teachers conference room. The school premises is approximately 0.68 acres, with a total of 28 acres of land.
