= Azimuddin Hanafi =

Bengali Islamic scholar (1838–1922)

Munshi Azimuddin al-Hanafi

Personal life
- Born: 1838 Gozadia, Mymensingh District, Bengal Presidency
- Died: 1922 (aged 83–84)

Religious life
- Religion: Islam
- Denomination: Sunni
- Jurisprudence: Hanafi
- Movement: Taiyuni

Muslim leader
- Disciple of: Karamat Ali Jaunpuri

Munshi Azimuddin Hanafi (1838–1922) was a Bengali Islamic scholar, social reformer, orator, poet and author.

== Early life and family ==
Munshi Azimuddin was born in 1838 to a Bengali Muslim family of Munshis in the village of Gozadia in the Mymensingh District of the Bengal Presidency (present-day Kishoreganj District, Bangladesh). His father, Munshi Borhanullah, was a bibliophile. The family was descended from one of the Mughal emperor Aurangzeb's ministers that were based in Jahangir Nagar, who later settled in Gozadia, which was under the jurisdiction of the Zamindars of Jangalbari.

== Education ==
Azimuddin studied at the local maktab up until the age of eleven years. He then pursued further Islamic studies in Calcutta and Bombay. He became a disciple of Karamat Ali Jaunpuri, founder of the Taiyuni movement, and associated himself with the Hanafi school of jurisprudence.

== Career ==
Munshi Azimuddin Hanafi rose to prominence as he engaged in literary and physical debates with Faraizi scholars, particular regarding Friday prayers. He performed the Hajj pilgrimage twice, travelling to Mecca by foot on both occasions. Azimuddin also supported the idea that British India was not a territory of war.

He wrote most of his books in Bengali in the puthi format and covered a variety of topics such as Islamic theology, history and women's rights. A small number of his works were written in Arabic and Urdu, and he was also proficient in Persian. Azimuddin has a large body of work titled Asrār as-Ṣalāh. His most notable work in Urdu was Resāla-e-Azīmuddīn Hanafī (1895) which challenged critics of the Hanafi school of thought. This work was published from the Ahmadi Press in Calcutta and began with a qasida written in Urdu. Azimuddin Hanafi translated the Futūḥ al-Shām by Al-Waqidi into Bengali for the first time. Some of his other Bengali works include:

- Āsaknāmā (1865)
- Qāzīnāmā (1865)
- Nājātul Islām (1870)
- Aqalnāmā (1893)
- Ġazabnāmā (1897)
- Bangla Bāra Salār Māne
- Kôlir Dhôrmô
- Mawlānā Abdul Hai O Azimuddiner Bahas
- Rasūler Kursīnāmā
- Desher Shobha (1881)
- Dukkher Sagôr (1913)

== Death and legacy ==
Munshi Azimuddin Hanafi died in Bengal in 1922. His works are preserved at the library of the India Office in London. In 2005, Muhammad Abdur Rashid Bhuiyan published a research paper on Azimuddin's life titled Munshi Azimuddin Nama.
