= Abdul Awwal Jaunpuri =

Indian Islamic scholar (1867–1921)

Mawlana Abdul Awwal Jaunpuri Baḥr al-ʿUlūm

Personal life
- Born: 1867 Sandwip, Bengal Presidency
- Died: June 18, 1921 (aged 53–54) Calcutta, Bengal Presidency
- Resting place: Maniktala, North Calcutta
- Children: 12 (including Abdul Batin Jaunpuri)
- Parent: Karamat Ali Jaunpuri (father)
- Education: Madrasah as-Sawlatiyah
- Occupation: Theologian, author
- Relatives: Hafiz Ahmad Jaunpuri (brother); Rashid Ahmad Jaunpuri (nephew); Abdur Rab Jaunpuri (nephew)

Religious life
- Religion: Islam
- Denomination: Sunni
- Jurisprudence: Hanafi
- Movement: Taiyuni

Muslim leader
- Teacher: Muhammad Hamed Bhabaniganji; Abd al-Hayy al-Lucknawi; Rahmatullah Kairanawi
- Predecessor: Karamat Ali Jaunpuri
- Influenced by: Karamat Ali Jaunpuri

ʿAbd al-Awwal Jaunpūrī (Urdu: عبد الاول جونپوری, Bengali: আব্দুল আউয়াল জৌনপুরী; 1867 – 18 June 1921) was an Indian Muslim scholar, religious preacher, educationist, poet and author. Described by Muhammad Mojlum Khan as one of the "most gifted and outstanding" of Karamat Ali Jaunpuri's many children, he displayed an important role leading his father's founded Taiyuni reformist movement in Bengal.

== Early life and family ==
Abdul Awwal Jaunpuri was born in 1867, as the youngest son of Karamat Ali Jaunpuri and Batul Bibi, on the island of Sandwip off the coast of Bengal. He belonged to an Indian Muslim family that traced their ancestry to the Arab tribe of Quraysh, with Jaunpuri being a 36th-generation direct descendant of Abu Bakr, the first Rashidun caliph. Jaunpuri's father had migrated from Jaunpur in North India with the intention of reforming the Muslims of Bengal. His paternal grandfather, Abu Ibrahim Shaykh Muhammad Imam Bakhsh was a student of Shah Abdul Aziz, and his great-grandfather Jarullah was also a shaykh. Many of his family members were also Islamic scholars, for example, his eldest brother Hafiz Ahmad Jaunpuri.

== Education ==
Jaunpuri learnt how to recite the Qur'an at the age of six. His parents died when he was eight years old, and so he came under the care of his cousin, Mawlana Salahuddin Ahmad, who took him back to Jaunpur. Jaunpuri completed its hifz (memorisation) at the age of thirteen, and led tarawih prayers that same year, completing the Qur'an in the first ten days of Ramadan. His talent began to be noticed, and he began leading prayers in various mosques across Jaunpur, Lucknow, Dacca and Noakhali.

Jaunpuri then studied Arabic grammar and Qur'anic studies under Moulvi Muhammad Hamed Bhabaniganji in Noakhali. In 1882, he proceeded to the Firangi Mahal institute in Lucknow, where he completed further Islamic studies and studied Arabic, Persian and Urdu. Among his teachers in Lucknow were Abd al-Hayy al-Lucknawi, Muhammad Naeem Nizami (with whom he studied at-Talwīḥ ʿalā at-Tawḍīḥ), Hafiz Abul Hasanat, Nizamuddin Lucknawi, Muhammad Muhsin, Muhammad Usman and Shah Zaman Vilayati. He studied under Mullah Hasan (with whom he studied Sharḥ al-ʿAqāid and Sharḥ as-Silm), Mullah Jalal (with whom he studied Sharh at-Tahdhīb) and Syed Sher Ali Bulandshahri (with whom he studied ar-Risālah al-Quṭbiyyah) in Jaunpur. After five years in Lucknow, he moved to Calcutta at the suggestion of the Bengali scholar Lutfur Rahman Burdwani. However, Burdwani was later unavailable for teaching advanced Arabic and so Jaunpuri set off for Mymensingh with his sister.

In 1887, he travelled to the Hejaz after gaining financial support from his father's disciple Qari Hafizuddin. He studied at the Indian-run Madrasah as-Sawlatiyah in Mecca for two years. Among his teachers in Mecca were Rahmatullah Kairanawi, Muhammad Noor and Abdullah bin Sayyid Husayn al-Makki. He also studied fiqh (Islamic jurisprudence), hadith, tafsir (Qur'anic exegesis) under Abdul Haq Allahabadi, who was one of his father's disciples based in Mecca. He eventually received ijazah (certification) from Allahabadi.

== Career ==
After completing his studies in the Arabian Peninsula, Jaunpuri did have plans to further study in countries like Egypt and the Levant. However, his eldest sister's son, Muslihuddin of Pabna, had died and so he returned to Jaunpur in 1889. Nevertheless, Jaunpuri managed to complete hajj twice during his time in Arabia. Like the rest of his family, he began to propagate Islamic teachings which included renouncing shirk (idolatry) and bid'ah (religious innovations) by means of public speeches. After spending a year travelling across various towns and villages in Jaunpur and eastern India. He returned to Bengal in 1890, to continue his father's movement, settling in the city of Dacca. He gave lectures at the Chawkbazar Shahi Mosque. His second son, Muhammad Hammad Abduz Zahir Jaunpuri (d. 1896-97 CE), died at an early age and in memory of him, Jaunpuri established the Madrasah-i-Hammadiyyah in the city's Armanitola neighbourhood.

As one of the main leaders of the pacifist Taiyuni movement, he received awards in recognition of his services from the local Nawabs of Dhaka and the ruling British Raj. Nawab Khwaja Salimullah was known to have performed Eid prayers behind Jaunpuri at the Lalbagh Fort. He began touring eastern Bengal, visiting places such as Mymensingh, Chandpur, Laksam and Faridpur. The latter was an important centre for their Faraizi opponents who were then under the leadership of Abdul Ghafur Naya Miyan (son of Dudu Miyan). For the first time in history, there began a union between the Faraizis and Taiyunis, as a result of Naya Miyan pledging bay'ah to Abdul Awwal Jaunpuri. Among Jaunpuri's activities was the condemnation of Sufi music, dancing and the veneration of shrines.

== Personal life ==
Jaunpuri married the daughter of Hafiz Ahsan, one of his early teachers in Jaunpur. Their first two sons, Abdul Akhir Jaunpuri and Muhammad Hammad Abduz Zahir Jaunpuri, died at an early age. They had five more sons and five daughters. His son, Abdul Batin Jaunpuri, wrote a biography of Karamat Ali Jaunpuri and Abdul Awwal Jaunpuri.

== Works ==
Jaunpuri was known to have authored 121 books, 89 of which have been published. The topics of his books ranged from Islamic jurisprudence and the history of Islam to Sufism and biographies of early Muslims. During his time in Mecca, Jaunpuri wrote two books. The first book, an-Nafhat al-Anbariyyah fi Isbat al-Qiyam fi Mawlud Khayr al-Bariyyah, advocated for the permissibility of the Mawlid and for its qiyam to be mustahabb. The book gained support from scholars in Mecca and Medina, and their accolades were added to the end of the book in later publications. His second book written in Mecca was Nawadir al-Munifah fi Manaqib al-Imam Abu Hanifah, which was a biography of the eighth-century Persian theologian Abu Hanifa.

1. an-Nafhat al-Anbariyyah li Ithbāt al-Qiyām fī Mawlud Khayr al-Bariyyah (on Mawlid)
2. an-Nawādir al-Munīfah fī Manāqib al-Imām Abu Ḥanīfah (on Abu Hanifah)
3. Khayr az-Zabūr fī Istiḥbāb Ziyārah al-Qubūr (1893, on visiting graves)
4. Hidāyah an-Niswān (1895, on women)
5. ad-Durrah al-Ghāliyah fi Manāqib Muʿāwiyah (1898, in defence of Mu'awiya I)
6. ad-Durr an-Nadid fī Gharir al-Qasid (1904, Arabic poetry)
7. al-Bayān al-Munsajim fī Kashf al-Musta'jim (1920, biography of 184 prophets, companions and awliya)
8. aṭ-Ṭarīf lil-Adīb aẓ-Ẓarīf
9. al-Musk al-Azfar fī Bayān al-Hajj al-Akbar wal-Asghar
10. al-Mawāhib al-Ulya fi Mawahid al-Ilahiyyah
11. al-Manṭūq fī Maʿrifah al-Furūq
12. Izharul haq
13. Lubb al-Tawarikh
14. Nafi al-Muslimin
15. Al-Ujalatul Murtajalah
16. Tarikh al-Awliya
17. al-Latāfah fī Jawazi Izāfat-i-Kāffah
18. al-Azhar fī Tasmuhi Sharḥ al-Mukhtasar
19. ʿArāis al-Afkār fī Mufākhirah al-Layl wan-Nahār
20. al-Shikadul Mu'til Ha'fili Li Musallafa Al-Imam Al-Suyuti
21. Fazl al-Khitāb fī Bayān Anna Abā Shahmata Huwa Ibnu Umar Bin al-Khattab
22. Asahh al-Kalām fī Takhrīj Ahādīth Khayr al-Anām
23. at-Talīd lish-Shāʿir al-Majīd
24. ar-Radīf lit-Tālī aṭ-Ṭarīf
25. Aḥsan al-Wasāil ilā Ḥifẓ al-Awāil
26. aṭ-Ṭarīq as-Sahl ilā Ḥāl Abī Jahl
27. al-Muḥākamāt bayna Faḍīlāt ʿAishah wa-Fāṭimah
28. al-Busṭā fī Bayān aṣ-Ṣalāh al-Wusṭā (Urdu)
29. Mufīd al-Muftī (Urdu)

== Death ==
Abdul Awwal Jaunpuri died on 18 June 1921 in Calcutta. He had arrived in Calcutta for medical aid from Faridpur. He was buried in Maniktala, North Calcutta, in the garden of his disciple Abdur Rahman Khan of Dhaka. His early biography, Seerat Molana Abdul Avval Jaunpuri Rehmatullahi Aleihi, was written by his son Abdul Batin Jaunpuri in 1950. Another one of his biographers, Muhammad Abdullah, identified 63 of his books and published Mawlana Abdul Awwal Jaunpuri in 1995.
