= Muhammad Ishaq (scholar) =

Bengali Sufi scholar (1883–1938)

- মুহম্মদ ইসহাক

Personal life
- Born: 1883 Feni, Noakhali District, Bengal Presidency
- Died: 19 November 1938 (aged 54–55)
- Education: Madrasah as-Sawlatiyah

Religious life
- Religion: Islam
- Denomination: Sunni
- Jurisprudence: Hanafi

Muslim leader
- Disciple of: Abdur Rab Jaunpuri

Mawlana Muhammad Ishaq (Bengali: মুহম্মদ ইসহাক; 1883 – 18 November 1938) was a Bengali Islamic scholar, Sufi, author and philanthropist.

== Early life and education ==
Ishaq was born in 1883 CE to a Bengali Muslim family in Feni, Noakhali District, Bengal Presidency. He received his primary religious education from the local religious institution. Then he got admitted into an 'alim course in Comilla. Later, he travelled to Makkah where he got admitted into the Madrasah as-Sawlatiyah. He studied Islamic studies and Arabic for eleven years in that institution, under Shaykhu'd-Dal'ail Abdul Haqq Muhajir Makki who treated him like his adopted son. Later, he was appointed as a teacher of that madrasa. He got khilafat from his teacher and returned to his own country.

== Career ==
After returning to Bengal, Ishaq was also involved in sufistic practices. It is said that he had karamat. People began to approach him for spiritual guidance. He travelled to Comilla, Noakhali, Barisal, Hatiya and Sandwip. In these places many people became his murids. Later, he renewed his bay'at at the hands of Abdur Rab Jaunpuri who was the grandson of Karamat Ali Jaunpuri. After that he began to be influenced by Taiyunis.

In 1936, Ishaq established the Ishaqiya Orphanage in Daganbhuiyan, Feni. He donated all of his immovable properties to this orphanage. Ishaq also gave financial help to establish mosques, eidgahs and madrasas.

Ishaq wrote an Urdu book titled Ta'lim-e-Haqqani Wa Fuyud-e-Ishaqi. In that book he described Sufi problems, zikr and mediation. He kept himself away from active politics but supported the independence movement of Jamiat Ulema-e-Hind.

== Death ==
Ishaq died on 18 November 1938.
