= Jaunpur =

Jaunpur may refer to the following places in India:

- Jaunpur, Uttar Pradesh, a city
  - Jaunpur district
  - Jaunpur Lok Sabha constituency
    - Jaunpur Assembly constituency
- Jaunpur Sultanate, a 15th-century northern Indian kingdom
- Jaunpur, Uttarakhand, an administrative division of Tehri Garhwal district

== See also ==
- Jaunpuri (disambiguation)
