= Radauli =

Radauli is a town in the city of Ayodhya in the state of Uttar Pradesh in India.

People of Radauli used the surname Radaulvi, and those from Ayodhya in general used the surname Ayodhyawasi.
