= Abdur Rab Jaunpuri =

Indian Islamic scholar (1875–1935)

Mawlana Abdur Rab Jaunpuri

Personal life
- Born: 1875 Mullatola, Jaunpur, North-Western Provinces
- Died: June 1935 (aged 59–60) Mollatala, Jaunpur, United Provinces
- Parent: Hafiz Mahmud Jaunpuri (father)
- Occupation: Theologian, author
- Relatives: Karamat Ali Jaunpuri (grandfather); Hafiz Ahmad Jaunpuri (uncle); Abdul Awwal Jaunpuri (uncle); Abdul Batin Jaunpuri (cousin); Rashid Ahmad Jaunpuri (cousin)

Religious life
- Religion: Islam
- Denomination: Sunni
- Jurisprudence: Hanafi
- Movement: Taiyuni

Muslim leader
- Teacher: Hafiz Ahmad Jaunpuri
- Predecessor: Hafiz Ahmad Jaunpuri
- Disciples: Muhammad Ishaq
- Influenced by: Karamat Ali Jaunpuri

ʿAbd ar-Rabb Jaunpūrī (Urdu: عبد الرب جونپوری, Bengali: আব্দুর রব জৌনপুরী; 1875 – June 1935) was an Indian Muslim scholar, author and teacher. He was associated with Taiyuni reformist movement, founded by his grandfather Karamat Ali Jaunpuri, and succeeded his uncle Hafiz Ahmad Jaunpuri as the leader of the movement in 1899.

== Early life and education ==
Abdul Rab Jaunpuri was born in 1875 to a scholarly Indian Muslim family in Mullatola, Jaunpur, located in the North-Western Provinces of the British Raj. His father, Hafiz Mahmud Jaunpuri, traced his ancestry to the Arab tribe of Quraysh, with Jaunpuri being a 37th-generation direct descendant of Abu Bakr, the first Rashidun caliph. Jaunpuri's grandfather Karamat Ali Jaunpuri was the founder of the Taiyuni reformist movement and propagated Islam in north India and Bengal. His great grandfather, Abu Ibrahim Shaykh Muhammad Imam Bakhsh ibn Shaykh Jarullah was a student of Shah Abdul Aziz Dehlavi. Many of his family members were also Islamic scholars, for example, his uncles Hafiz Ahmad Jaunpuri and Abdul Awwal Jaunpuri, and his cousin Rashid Ahmed Jaunpuri.

Jaunpuri's father died when he was five years old, so he was brought up and educated by his uncle Hafiz Ahmad Jaunpuri. He memorised the Qur'an in his childhood, and studied the Arabic and Persian languages. He was said to have mastered the knowledge of ma'rifa.

== Career ==
Jaunpuri worked alongside his uncle in establishing numerous religious institutions in Daulatkhan in the Bengali island of Bhola. He established a langar khana which provided meals to needy people in the area. Jaunpuri toured many different parts of Bengal, giving public lectures, where he gained a large following. Notable locations include Sandwip and Barisal. He also wrote books in Urdu such as Nafeul Khalaiq. Many of the next generation of Islamic scholars were his murids such as Muhammad Ishaq and Abul Hasanat Muhammad Abdul Hayy.

== Death ==
Jaunpuri died in June 1935 in his home neighbourhood of Mullatola in Jaunpur, then located under the United Provinces of British India.

== Spiritual genealogy ==
His spiritual genealogy is as follows:

1. Prophet Muhammad
2. Abū Bakr
3. Salmān al-Fārisī
4. Al-Qāsim bin Muḥammad bin Abī Bakr
5. Jaʿfar bin Muḥammad bin ʿAlī aṣ-Ṣādiq
6. Abū Yazīd Ṭayfūr al-Bisṭāmī
7. Abu al-Ḥasan ʿAlī al-Kharaqānī
8. Abū ʿAlī Faḍl bin Muḥammad bin ʿAlī al-Fārmadī
9. Abū Yaʿqūb Yūsuf al-Hamadānī
10. ʿAbd al-Khāliq al-Ghijdawānī
11. Khwājah Muḥammad ʿĀrif al-Riwgarī
12. Khwājah Maḥmūd al-Anjīr al-Faghnawī
13. ʿAzīzān ʿAlī ar-Rāmitānī
14. Sayyid Shams ad-Dīn Amīr Kulāl
15. Muḥammad Bābā as-Samāsī
16. Sayyid Bahā ad-Dīn Naqshband
17. Sayyid Mīr ʿAlā ad-Dīn ʿAṭṭār
18. Yaʿqūb Charkhī
19. Khwājah ʿUbaydullāh Aḥrār
20. Khwājah Muḥammad Zāhid Wakhshī
21. Khwājah Darwesh Muḥammad
22. Khwājah Muḥammad Amkingī
23. Khwājah Raḍī ad-Dīn Muḥammad Bāqī Billāh
24. Aḥmad al-Fārūqī as-Sirhindī
25. Sayyid Ādam bin Nūrī
26. Sayyid ʿAbdullāh Akbarābādī
27. Shāh ʿAbd ar-Raḥīm Dehlawī
28. Shāh Walīullāh Dehlawī
29. Shāh ʿAbd al-ʿAzīz Dehlawī
30. Sayyid Aḥmad Shahīd
31. Karāmat ʿAlī bin Abī Ibrāhīm Muḥammad Imām Bakhsh bin Jār Allāh al-Jaunpūrī
32. Ḥāfiẓ Aḥmad bin ʿAlī al-Jaunpūrī
33. ʿAbd ar-Rabb bin Maḥmud bin ʿAlī al-Jaunpūrī
