= Nabinchandra Sen =

Bengali poet and writer (1847–1909)

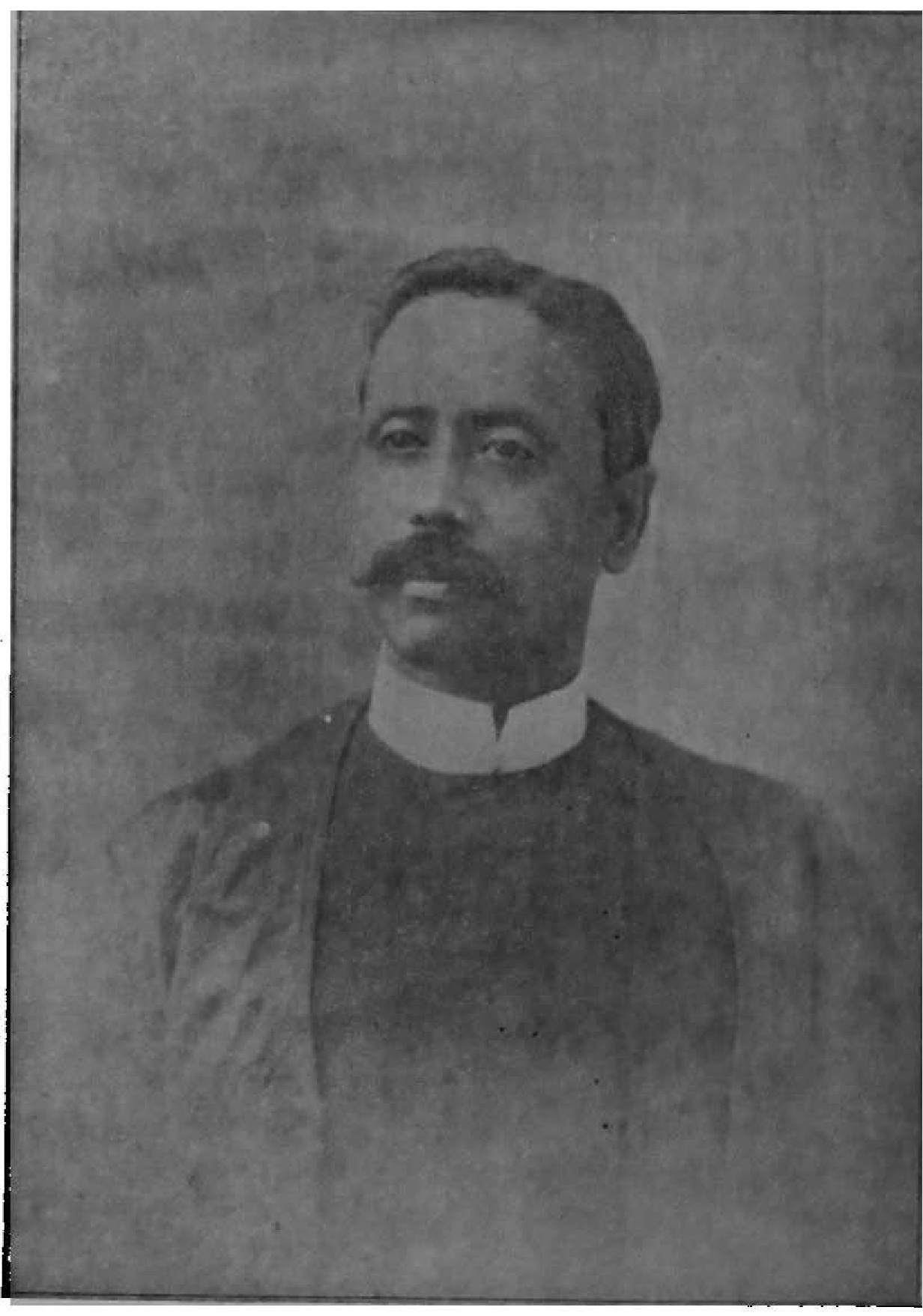
- Born: 10 February 1847; Chittagong, Bengal Presidency, British India
- Died: 23 January 1909 (aged 61); Kolkata, Bengal Province, British India
- Occupation: Poet

Nabinchandra Sen (Bengali: নবীনচন্দ্র সেন; 10 February 1847 – 23 January 1909) was a Bengali poet and writer, often considered one of the greatest poets prior to the arrival of Rabindranath Tagore. He commented on the Battle of Plassey and the arrival of British rule in India as "a night of Eternal Gloom".

== Life ==
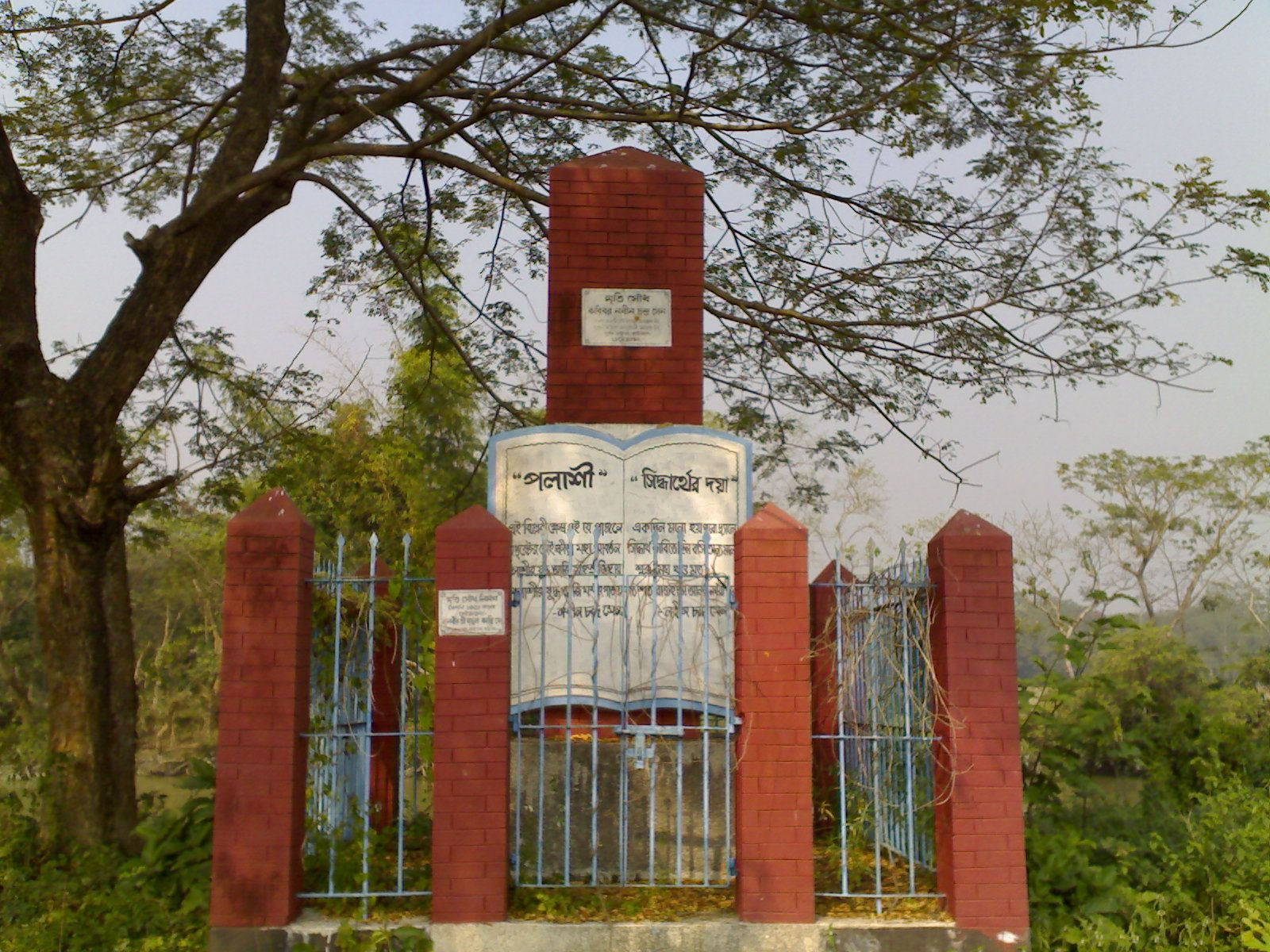
Nabinchandra Sen's tomb

Nabinchandra was born in Noapara, Raozan Upazila, in Chittagong on 10 February 1847 in a Baidya family. He studied at the Chittagong Collegiate School, clearing the school-leaving Entrance examination in 1863. In 1865, he passed the FA exam from Presidency College, Calcutta. In 1868, he earned his BA from General Assembly's Institution (now Scottish Church College), and after teaching for a brief period at Hare School, he joined the colonial administrative services as a deputy magistrate. Sen retired in 1904, and died on 23 January 1909. He has been considered one of Bengal's greatest writers and poets.

== Works ==
Sen's earliest poems were published in the Education Gazette, edited by Peary Charan Sarker, and his first volume of poetry, Abakash Ranjani, was published in 1871. A second volume of Abakash Ranjani was published in 1877. Palashir Juddha (1875), a long epic poem lamenting the betrayal of Siraj ud-Daulah by his followers and his defeat at the Battle of Plassey, was an evocative expression of Bengali nationalism in literature, and it established his reputation as a powerful Bengali poet. A contemporary of Michael Madhusudan Dutt, Nabichandra is also known for popularizing the epic narrative in the Bengali language through his reinterpretations of the Mahabharata in a three-volume epic:Raivatak (1887), Kuruksetra (1893) and Prabhas (1896), where Krishna serves as the protagonist and adventurer during the fall of kingdoms. He wrote biographies of Jesus, Buddha, and Cleopatra in the Bengali language, and made verse translations of the Bhagavad Gita and the Markandeya Purana. Nabindrachandra's Bhanumati (a novel-in-verse) and "Prabaser Patra" (a memoir of his travels) also brought him fame. His five-volume autobiography, Amar Jiban (My Life), is an important document chronicling the politics and social aspirations of the Bengali literati in the late nineteenth century.

== Bibliography ==
=== Epics ===
His epic trilogy was based on New Mahabharata.

- Raivatak
- Kurukkhetra
- Provash

=== Poetry ===
- Abakash Ranjani (1871)
- Palashir Juddha (1875)

=== Biographies ===
- Amitabha (biography of the Buddha)
- Khrishta'ra Jibani (biography of Jesus Christ)
- Cleopatra (biography of Cleopatra)

=== Autobiography ===
- Probasher Potro
- Amar Jiban, in 5 volumes

=== Poetic translations ===
- Geeta
- Chandi

=== Poetic novel ===
- Bhanumoti
