= Chawk Mosque, Dhaka =

Mosque in Chowkbazar, Dhaka, Bangladesh

Chawkbazar Shahi Mosque
- চকবাজার শাহী মসজিদ
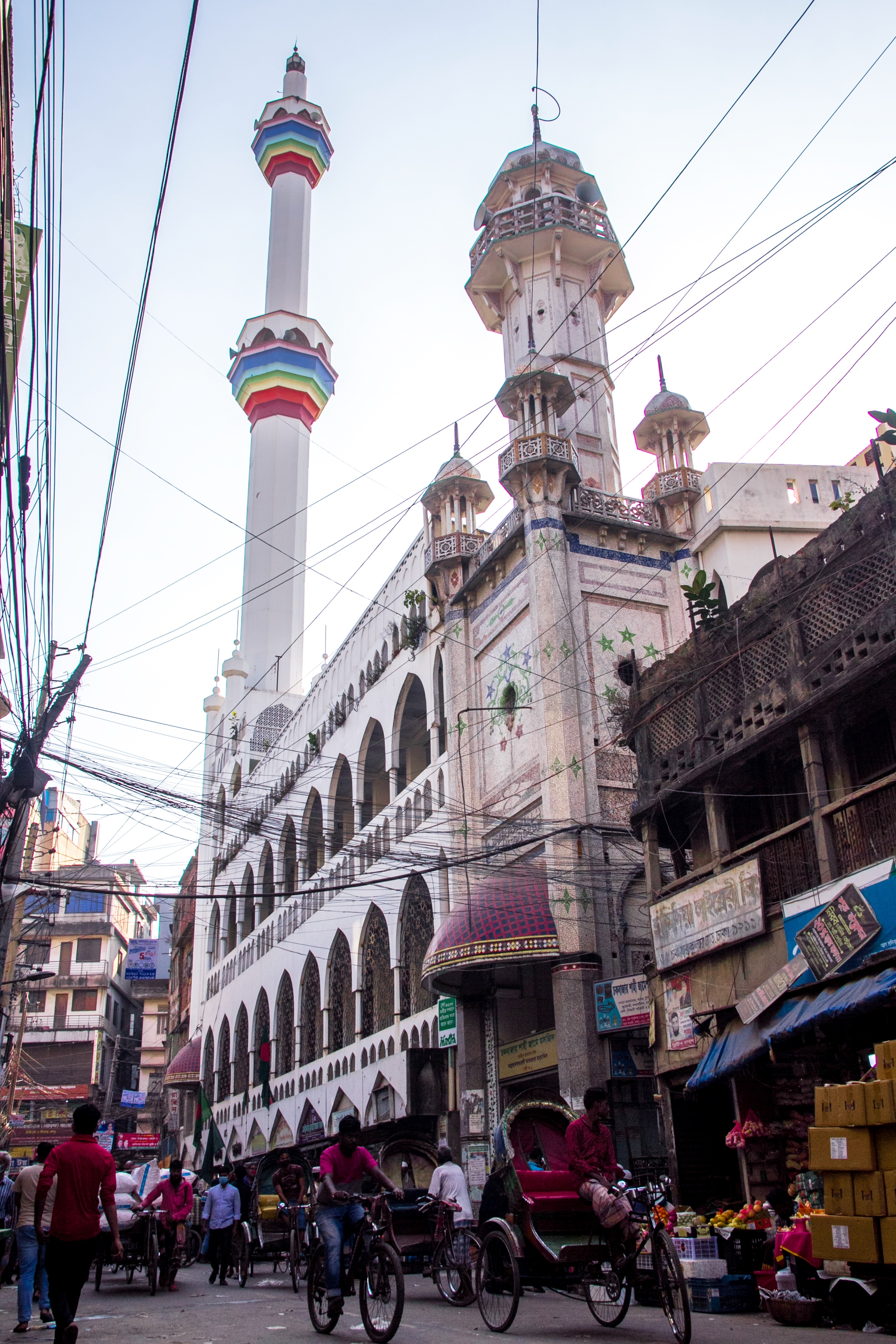
- The mosque in 2020

- Location of the mosque in Dhaka

Religion
- Affiliation: Islam
- Ecclesiastical or organisational status: Mosque
- Status: Active

Location
- Location: Chowk Bazaar, Dhaka
- Country: Bangladesh
- Coordinates: 23°42′58″N 90°23′45″E

Architecture
- Style: Mughal
- Groundbreaking: 1664 CE
- Completed: 1086 AH (1675/1676 CE)

Specifications
- Capacity: c. 10,000 worshipers
- Dome: Three
- Minaret: Ten

The Chawkbazar Shahi Mosque (Bengali: চকবাজার শাহী মসজিদ), also known as Chawk Mosque, is a mosque located in the Chowk Bazaar area in the old city of Dhaka, Bangladesh.

== History ==
The mosque was constructed in 1664 by Shaista Khan, the Subahdar of Mughal Bengal. The mosque is known as the Shahi Mosque because it was founded by the Mughal governor or Subahdar. The mosque is built above a raised platform. The three domed mosque above the platform, now transformed into a multi-storied structure was originally a copy of Shaista Khan's another three domed mosque at the Mitford Hospital compound near the Buriganga River. There are some square-shaped rooms built for the Imam and for students of the madrasa. Today the original building design has lost much of its original form through multiple renovations and extensions. The mosque is noted for having a rainbow minaret.

== Architecture ==
The promenade around the three domed prayer chamber, since there was no separate structure for study purpose, might have been used for open-air classes and the vaulted room with book-shelves on their walls underneath the platform may have been designed to provide residential accommodation for those who used to teach and study here. In that context Chawk Mosque may be regarded as the first known example of Residential Madrasa Mosque.

The construction has been dated from 1664 CE, as noted by an inscription in Persian over a doorway. The inscription attributes the project to Subahdar Shaista Khan. So far known this is the earliest dated mosque in the History of Muslim Architecture in Bengal built on a high vaulted platform. Its architectural design was perhaps influenced by Tughlaq Architectures; such as Khirki Masjid or Kalan Mosque of Delhi. Influenced by this structure some other mosques were built in Dhaka and Murshidabad.

It has been suggested that Shaista Khan himself had composed the versified inscription, as his poetic nom de plume was "Talib". The inscription reads:

"The rightly guided Amīr al-Umarā Shaista Khan - built this mosque for the sake of God / To the seeker (t̤ālib) enquiring its date - I said, "God's bidding is accomplished" / Year 1086 Hijri (1675-76 CE)."

== Gallery ==
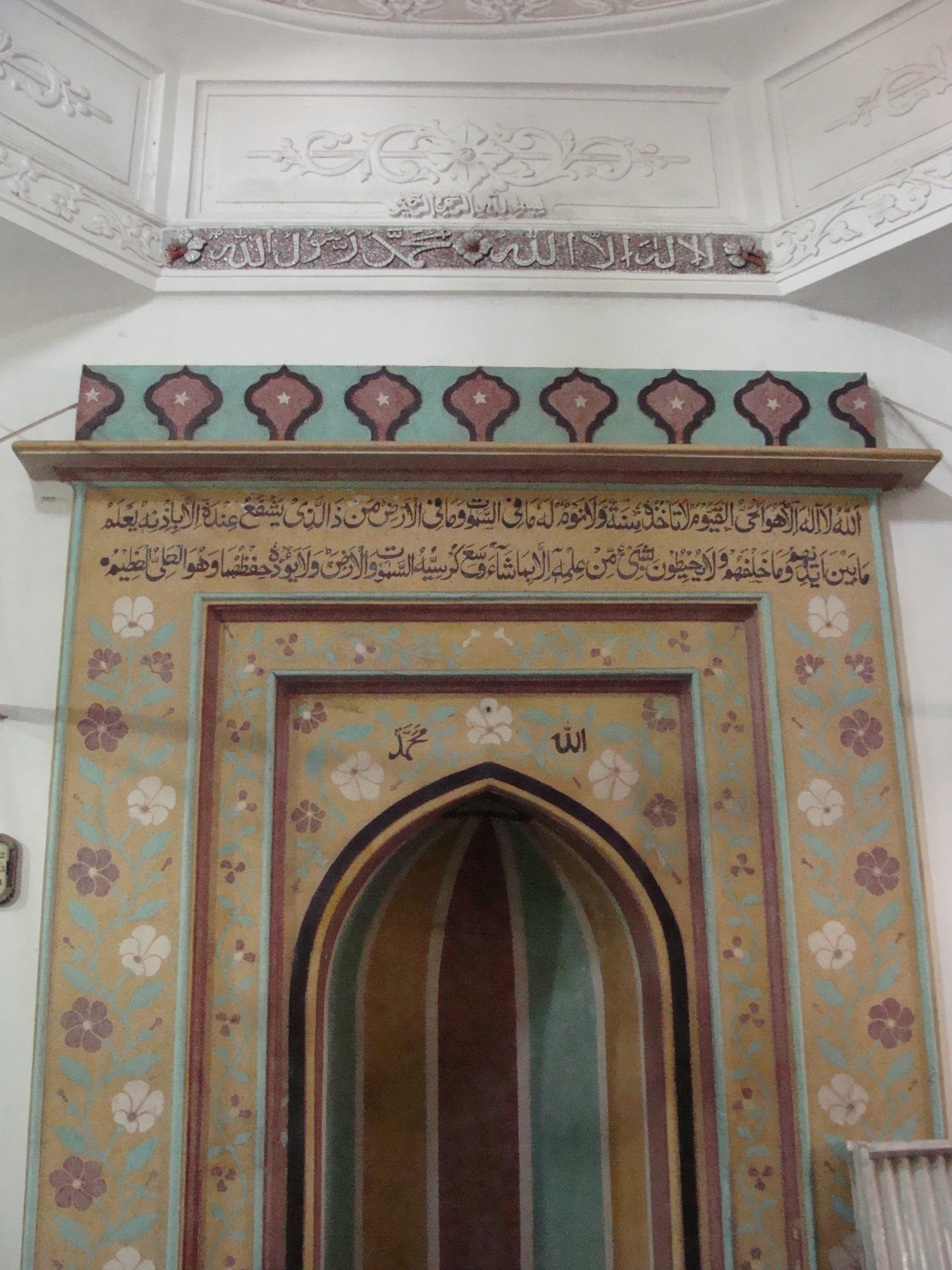
The central Mihrab

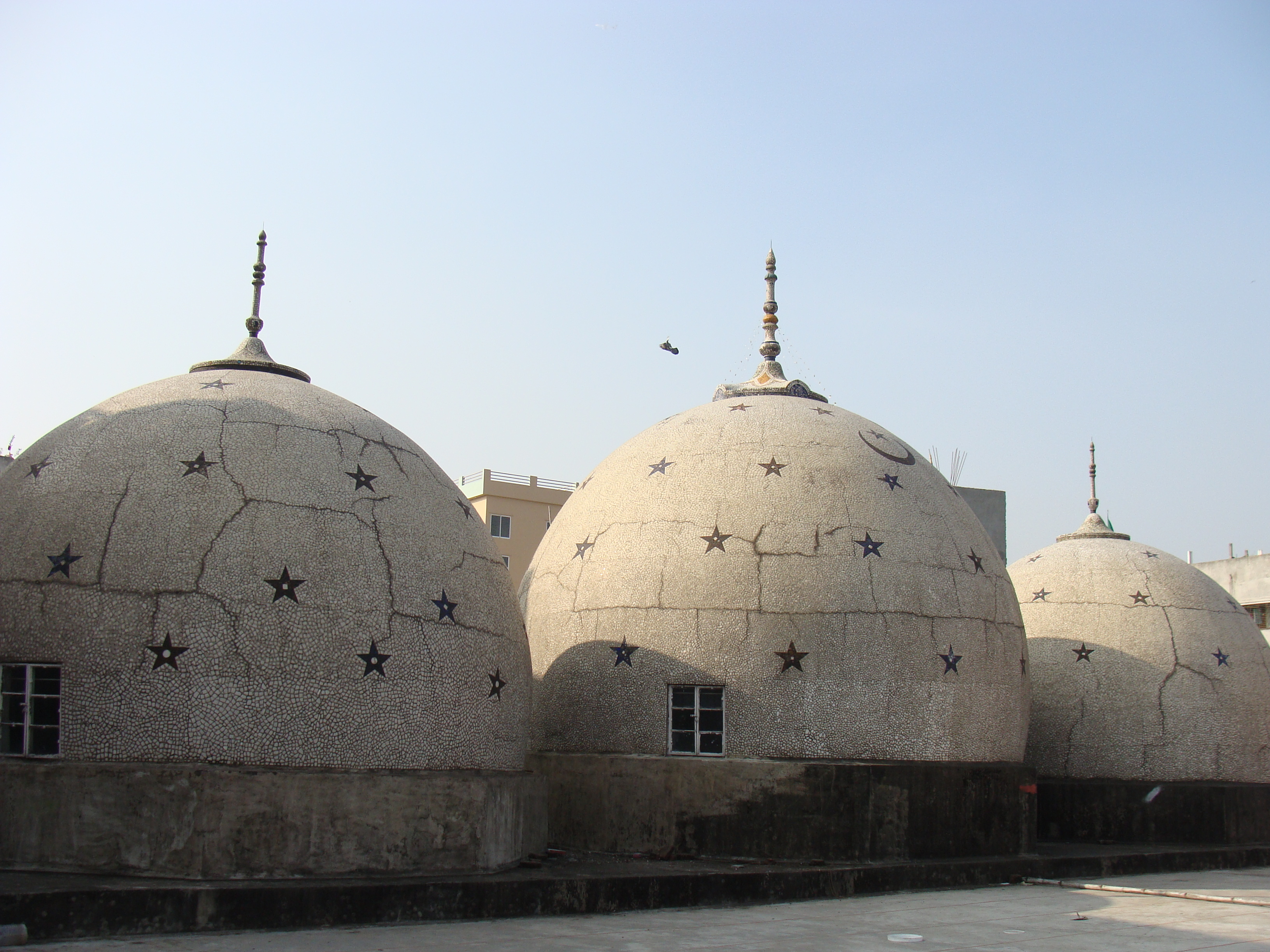
The three domes

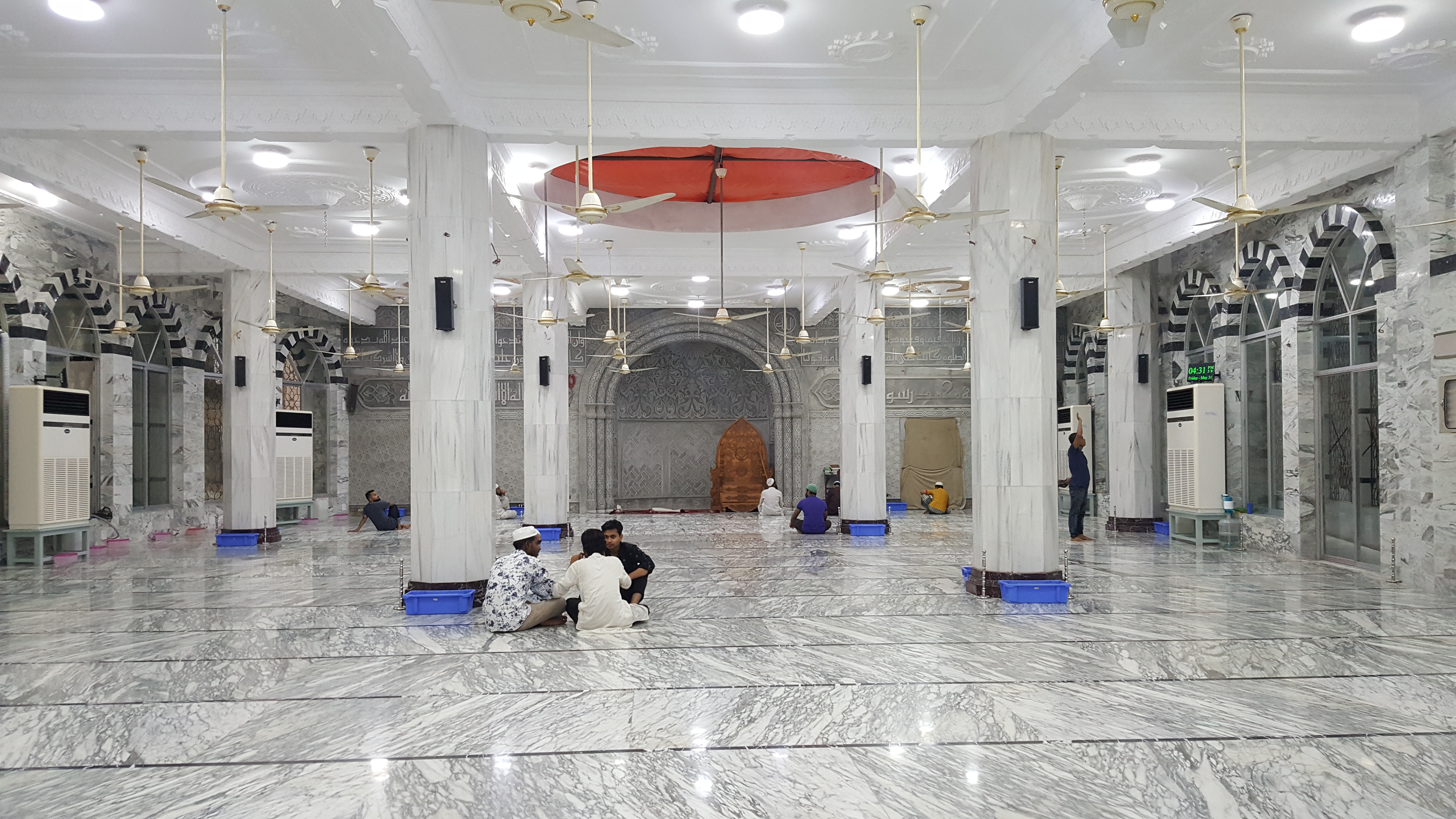
The interior of the mosque in May 2019

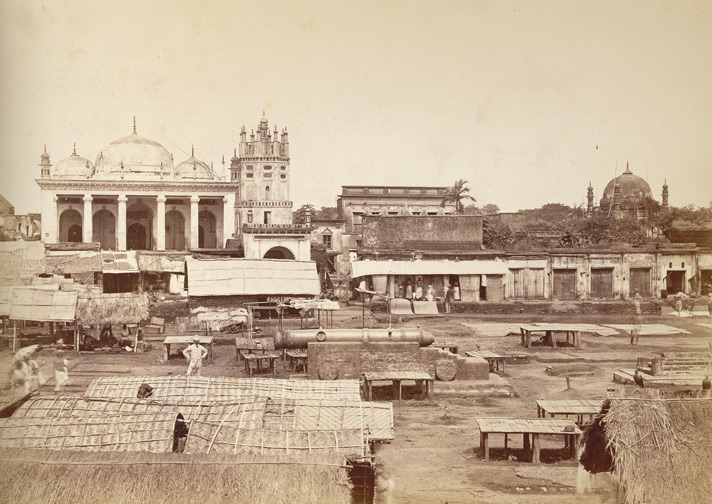
The mosque (on the upper-left), photographed by Johnston and Hoffmann in 1885

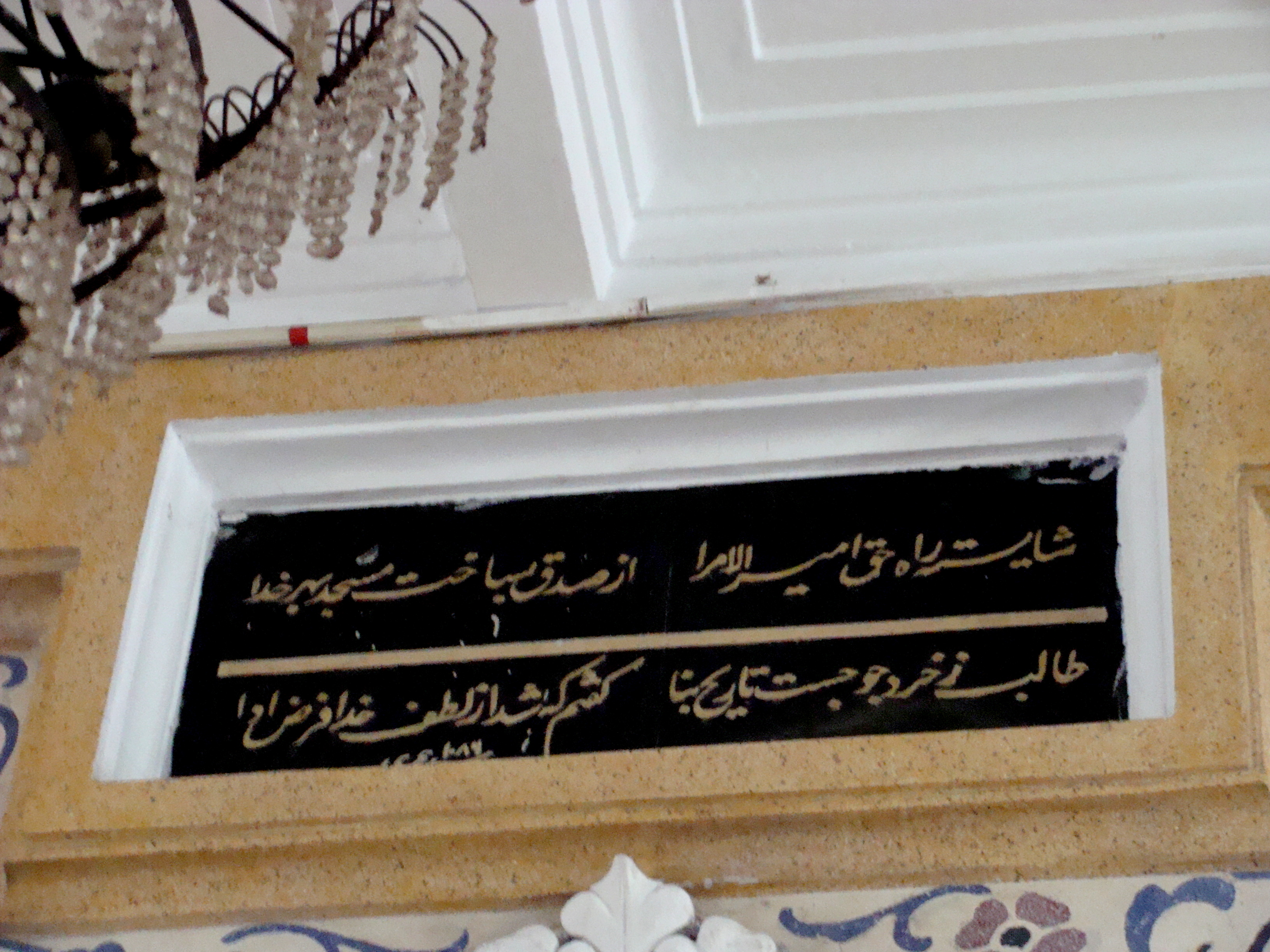
The inscription

== See also ==
- Islam in Bangladesh
- List of mosques in Bangladesh
