= Syed Rashid Ahmed Jaunpuri =

20th-century Sufi Muslim saint

- সৈয়দ রশীদ আহমদ জৌনপুরি

Personal life
- Born: 25 December 1889; Mollatuli, Jaunpur, India
- Died: 5 September 2001 (aged 111); Dhaka, Bangladesh
- Resting place: Baitur Rahim Masjid, Mirpur, Dhaka, Bangladesh
- Relatives: Karamat Ali Jaunpuri (maternal grandfather); Hafiz Ahmad Jaunpuri (maternal uncle); Abdul Awwal Jaunpuri (maternal uncle); Abdur Rab Jaunpuri (maternal cousin)

Religious life
- Religion: Islam
- Movement: Barelvi

Muslim leader
- Disciples: M Harunur Rashid
- Influenced by: Ahmed Raza Khan Barelvi

Syed Rashid Ahmed Jaunpuri (Bengali: সৈয়দ রশীদ আহমদ জৌনপুরী; 1889–2001) was a Sufi saint, author, scholar of Hadith and Quran, and Muslim missionary in Bangladesh. He was influenced by Ahmed Raza Khan Barelvi and his Barelvi movement.

He also wrote Urdu ghazals, nazm, hamd and naat, his pen name being Fani. As a Sufi master, he was initiated in Qadiriyya, Chishti, Naqshbandi, Naqshbandiyya-Mujaddidiyya, Shadhili, Uwaisi, Qalandariyya, Saberiyya and Nizamiyya orders.

His teachings stated that Islam was a unified whole of shariat (exoteric path), tariqa (esoteric path), haqiqat (mystical truth), and marefat (final mystical knowledge), and was incomplete without any one of these. He refused to depend on charity, and lived in Bangladesh almost incognito.

== Parental lineage ==
Syed Rashid Ahmed Jaunpuri's devotees state that his maternal lineage goes back to Caliph Abu Bakr, the first political successor of Islam, and his paternal lineage to Ali, the fourth political successor (caliph) of Islam. His grandfather had settled first in Noakhali, Bangladesh and then in Rangpur.

== Encounter with fakir ==
Just forty days after his birth, a fakir came to their house and told his father that he had come under orders from Mohiuddin Abdul Qader Jilani to take the child. His father felt some kind of hesitation, but his mother, immediately agreed to the proposal and handed over the new born baby to the fakir. The fakir returned him after a year or so.

== Education ==
His mother was his first teacher and instrumental in his religious education. When he was eighteen, he came to Calcutta with his maternal uncle and murshid Abdul Awwal Siddiqui Jaunpuri and stayed at 7 Jannagar Road, Park Circus, Calcutta.

He was admitted to the Calcutta Alia Madrasa and passed his entrance and later F.A. examinations from this institution. He went to Cairo for higher education, and studied tafsir and other Islamic studies at the University of Al-Azhar. He came back to Kolkata after two years. When he was 35, he made a voyage to California, and studied homeopathy in Los Angeles.

== Family life ==
When he was 20, he married one of his distant cousins, Syeda Shahnaz Begum who died in 1941 bearing one son and three daughters. None of his children were alive when he migrated to Bangladesh. In the mid-sixties he married Rabeya Khatun, an inhabitant of Ghoshpur of Howrah District, Kolkata. He built a small house in Mirpur Section 12, near Baitus Salam masjid. It was he who laid the foundation of this masjid. In his house, he set up a homeopathy medicine shop and started a practice, soon becoming well known in his neighborhood.

Since his second wife Rabeya Khatun was barren, and he did not have any children by her, he married Aqia Begum, the daughter of Mohammad Shamsher Ali, of Genda, Savar in suburban Dhaka. He lived in this village for some time. He had one son and three daughters by his third wife.

He adopted Helena Begum in 1965, an orphan, whose parents died of hunger in dire poverty.

On 13 August 2001, he married Umme Kulthum Monowara Zerin, daughter of Sheikh Wajed Ali, who hailed from Howrah, Kolkata. They had no children and he died later in the year.

== Spiritual quest ==
In his late teens Jaunpuri became a disciple of his maternal uncle Syed Abdul Awal Siddiqui Jaunpuri, a scholar of Islam and Sufism. He later studied with several other religious teachers, including Naim Ata Shah Bokhari, Syed Umar Uddin Multani, Syed Abu Nasr Madani, Syed Noor Mohammad Multani, Abdul Masjud Jabbalpuri, Shah Syed Sultan Ahmed Shahjahanpuri.

From 1996 onwards, he performed Hajj with his disciples and admirers. In Medina, they had their ancestral home in the south-west of the Haram Sharif. In the late 1980s he started to address the Friday congregation at Baitur Rahim Mosque as preacher (khatib).

== Travels and life in solitude ==
Jaunpuri traveled widely in North India. A book by one of his disciples states that he met 445 spiritual individuals over his travels. He lived for a while inside the Sundarbans forest, seeking solitude.

== Death ==
On 2 September 2001, he was hospitalized for a pain in his chest. His condition improved briefly before deteriorating again two days later. He was taken to the National Institute of Cardiovascular Diseases (Suhrawardy Hospital), where he died at 11 am on 5 September. According to his disciples, he was nearly 113 years old when he died.

== Tomb ==
Jaunpuri was buried in a graveyard adjacent to the Baitur Rahim Masjid in Dhaka. Later, the 120-foot (37 m) tall minaret of the mosque was built over his grave.

== Works ==
Jaunpuri was the author of four books on topics such as Islam, Sufism, religion, and Islamic philosophy. M Harunur Rashid, who was a devotee of Jaunpuri, wrote a number of works based on his philosophy and vision.

As Author

- Sattyer Prokash (Revelation of truth), Published by Retd. Lt. Colonel Khandaker Ataur Rahman. Dhaka. 1994
- Istafsar wa Jawaab (A Book of Catechism), Lamisa Books. Dhaka. 1997
- Quran, Hadith O Suiftatter Bhumika (Introduction to Quran, Hadith and Sufism). Syed Rashid Ahmed Mission Foundation. Dhaka. 2005. ISBN 984-3219384
- Tariq Al-Haq (The Way of Truth), Syed Rashid Ahmed Mission Foundation. Dhaka. 2006.

Works about Syed Rashid Ahmed Jaunpuri

- Vruner Ma Manusher Allah Ebang Annanya Sanglap (Foetus's Mother, Man's Allah and Other Dialogues: A book of dialogues illustrating the Philosophy of Hazrat Syed Rashid Ahmed Jaunpuri) by M. Harunur Rashid. Lamisa Books. Dhaka. 1996
- Niruddesh Nadi Antaheen Sagar O Annanya Sanglap (The Lost River, The Boundless Sea and Other Dialogues: A Book of dialogues illustrating the Philosophy of Hazrat Syed Rashid Ahmed Jaupuri) by M. Harunur Rashid. Lamisa Books. Dhaka. 1997
- Ichchaheen Ghare Ichchar Bashabash Ebang Annanya Sanglap (Desire in a Desireless Abode and Other Dialogues: A Book of dialogues illustrating the Philosophy of Hazrat Syed Rashid Ahmed Jaupuri) by M. Harunur Rashid. Lamisa Books. Dhaka. 1997
- Ma'Arefus Sunan by Maulana Muhammad Fazle Rab. Syed Rashid Ahmed Islami Academy. Dhaka. 1997.
- Beduiner Lal Ut Ebang Annanya Sanglap (Bedouin's Red Camel and Other Dialogues: A Book of dialogues illustrating the Philosophy of Hazrat Syed Rashid Ahmed Jaupuri) by M. Harunur Rashid. Lamisa Books. Dhaka. 1997
- Jiboner Gandi, Mrityur Thikana Ebang Annanya Sanglap (The Bounds of Life, Death's Destination and Other Dialogues: A Book of dialogues illustrating the Philosophy of Hazrat Syed Rashid Ahmed Jaupuri) by M. Harunur Rashid. Lamisa Books. Dhaka. 1999
- Syed Rashid Ahmed Jaunpuri (RA) er Dharmadarshaner Bhumika (A Preface to the Religious Philosophy of Syed Rashid Ahmed Jaunpuri) by M. Harunur Rashid. Lamisa Books. Dhaka. 2004
- Dialogue on Islam: Syed Rashid Ahmed Jaunpuri on The Form and Spirit of Islam by M. Harunur Rashid. Lamisa Books. Dhaka. 1999. ISBN 984-31-0584-2
- Swapner Moroke Ichchar Basabas (Poems dedicated to Syed Rashid Ahmed Jaunpuri) by M. Harunur Rashid. Anupam Prakashani. Dhaka. 2002.
- Syed Rashid Ahmed Jaunpuri (ra) Smarak Grantha (Memorial Volume) Edited by M. Harunur Rashid. Pathak Shamabesh. Dhaka. 2013. ISBN 978-9848866849
- Syed Rashid Ahmed Jaunpuri (ra) Sufi Tatta Bodhini Kathammrito Sagar (Lectures on Applied Sufi Lessons) by M. Harunur Rashid. Shamabesh. Dhaka. 2015
