= Pirgacha Upazila =

Pirgacha Upazila পীরগাছা
- Upazila
- Pirgacha
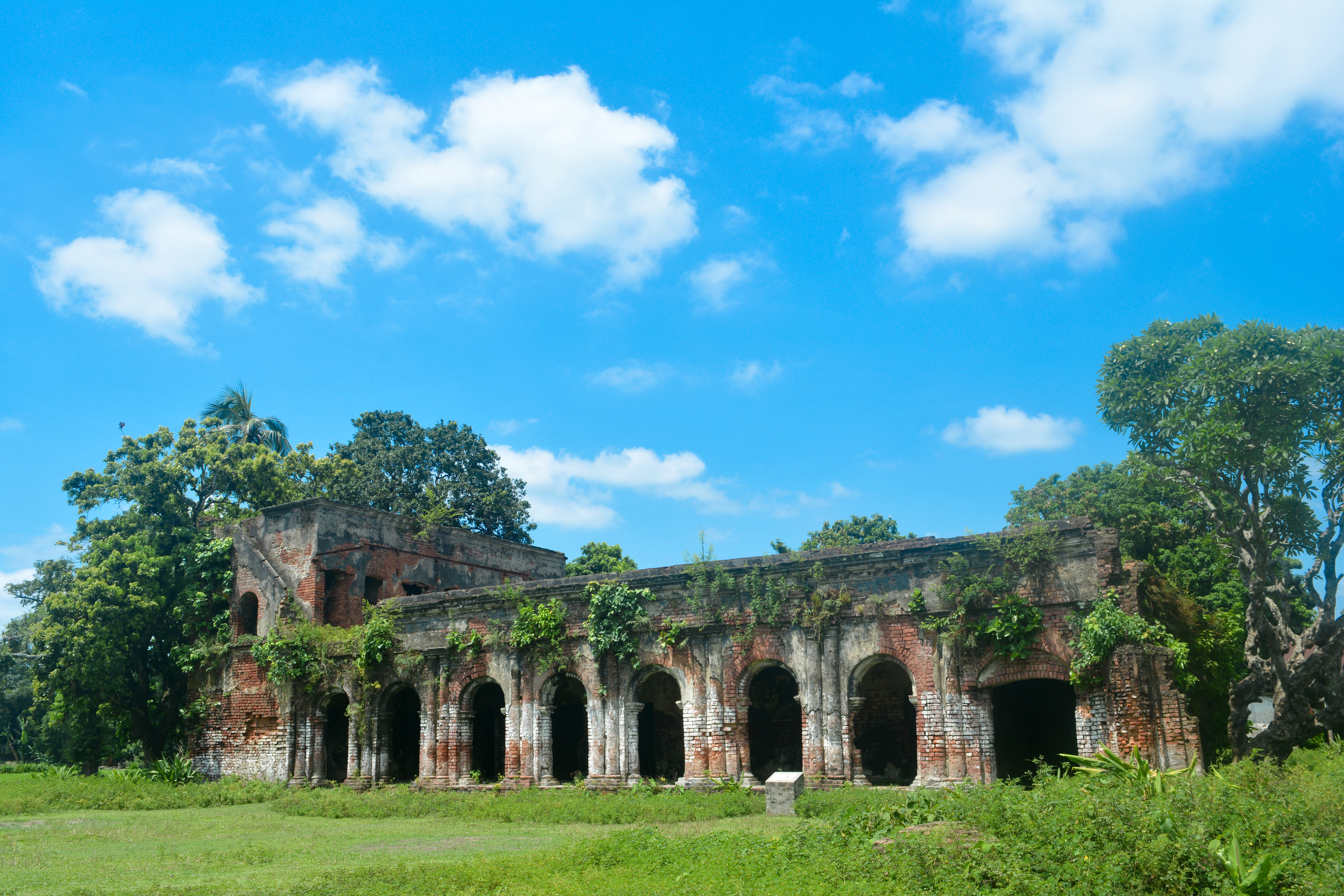
- Itakumari Zamidar Bari

- Coordinates: 25°34.8′N 89°24′E
- Country: Bangladesh
- Division: Rangpur
- District: Rangpur

Government
  - Current Chairman: Mahbubar Rahman

Area
  - Total: 266.85 km^{2} (103.03 sq mi)

Population (2022)
  - Total: 326,622
  - Density: 1,224.0/km^{2} (3,170.1/sq mi)
- Time zone: UTC+6 (BST)
- Postal code: 5450
- Website: pirgacha.rangpur.gov.bd

Pirgachha Upazila mauza geocode map

Pirgacha (Bengali: পীরগাছা) is an upazila (subdistrict) of Rangpur District in the division of Rangpur, Bangladesh.

== Geography ==
Pirgacha is located at 25.5806°N 89.4000°E. It has 82,623 households and total area 266.85 km^{2}. Tambulpur on the bank of River Burail. Pirgacha upazila is at the south-east corner of Rangpur town. Tambulpur is the largest union of Pirgacha Upazila. It is about 12 kilometers east to west and about 6 kilometers north to south.

== Demographics ==
Religions in Pirgachha Upazila (2022)
Religion	Percent
Islam	91.37%
Hinduism	8.52%
Other or not stated	0.05%

According to the 2022 Bangladeshi census, Pirgachha Upazila had 91,311 households and a population of 326,622. 9.12% of the population were under 5 years of age. Pirgachha had a literacy rate (age 7 and over) of 65.60%: 69.42% for males and 62.07% for females, and a sex ratio of 93.62 males for every 100 females. 31,226 (9.56%) lived in urban areas.

According to the 2011 Census of Bangladesh, Pirgachha Upazila had 82,623 households and a population of 313,319. 68,918 (22.00%) were under 10 years of age. Pirgachha had a literacy rate (age 7 and over) of 44.61%, compared to the national average of 51.8%, and a sex ratio of 1041 females per 1000 males. 13,037 (4.16%) lived in urban areas.

As of the 1991 Bangladesh census, Pirgachha has a population of 256,573. Males constitute 50.59% of the population, and females 49.41%. This Upazila's eighteen up population is 125484. Pirgachha has an average literacy rate of 21.5% (7+ years), and the national average of 32.4% literate.

== Administration ==
Pirgacha Upazila is divided into nine union parishad: Anandanagar, Chhaola, Itakumari, Kaikuri, Kalyani, Kandi, Parul, Pirgacha, and Tambulpur. The union parishads are subdivided into 170 mauzas and 170 villages.

== See also ==
- Upazilas of Bangladesh
- Districts of Bangladesh
- Divisions of Bangladesh
