= Motilal Nehru National Institute of Technology =

Public technical institution in Uttar Pradesh, India

Coordinates: 25.4918°N 81.8658°E

- Former name: Motilal Nehru Regional Engineering College
- Motto in English: Success is born out of action.
- Type: Government
- Established: 1961; 65 years ago
- Chairperson: Vivek Lall
- Director: Rama Shanker Verma
- Faculty: 280
- Students: 6266
- Undergraduates: 4348
- Postgraduates: 1299
- Doctoral students: 619
- Location: Prayagraj, Uttar Pradesh, India
- Campus: Urban 90 ha (222 acres)
- Website: www.mnnit.ac.in

Motilal Nehru National Institute of Technology (MNNIT or NIT Allahabad), formerly Motilal Nehru Regional Engineering College (MNREC), is one of the 31 National Institutes of Technology (NITs), located in Prayagraj of Uttar Pradesh in India. The college is recognized as an Institute of National Importance under the National Institutes of Technology, Science Education and Research Act, 2007. The college has the distinction of being the first in the country to start an undergraduate programme in Computer Science & Engineering, in 1976–77.

== History ==
Inauguration of Main Building of MNREC Allahabad on 19 March 1965. From Left to right, cutting the ribbon are Gopal Kishore Agrawal (founder principal), Prime Minister Lal Bahadur Shastri and Chief Minister of Uttar Pradesh Chandra Bhanu Gupta.

Motilal Nehru Regional Engineering College was established in 1961, as a part of the seventeen Regional Engineering Colleges as a joint enterprise of the Government of India and the Government of Uttar Pradesh. MNREC was started with undergraduate courses in three engineering disciplines - Civil engineering, Electrical engineering and Mechanical engineering. The foundation stone was laid by Jawaharlal Nehru, the first Prime Minister of India, and the institute was named after his father, lawyer, and freedom fighter, Motilal Nehru. The founding principal of the college was Gopal Kishore Agrawal.

The main building of the college was inaugurated by Prime Minister Lal Bahadur Shastri on 18 April 1965. Effective from 26 June 2002, the college became a deemed university and was renamed Motilal Nehru National Institute of Technology.

The institute was the first in the country to offer an undergraduate program in Computer Science and Engineering, which was started in 1976, under the Electrical Engineering department. In 1982-83 undergraduate programs in Electronics Engineering, and Production and Industrial Engineering were started.

The first Master's Programme of the institute was introduced by the Mechanical Engineering Department in the year 1966, offering a two-year M.Tech. programme in Mechanical Engineering. Subsequently, masters programmes in other engineering disciplines were introduced in 1970–71.

It is among the few technical institutions in India to house two supercomputers, PARAM 8000 and PARAM 10000.

== Academics ==
=== Undergraduate ===
MNNIT offers ten four-year B.Tech. programmes in Biotechnology, Chemical engineering, Civil engineering, Electrical engineering, Computer science and engineering, Electronics and Communication engineering, Mechanical engineering, Production and Industrial Engineering, Engineering and Computational Mechanics and Materials Engineering. Earlier, B.Tech. in Information technology was also offered, but it was discontinued in 2021 and the seats were subsumed by the computer science and engineering programme.

=== Postgraduate ===
MNNIT offers 23 post-graduate programs of two-year duration leading to M.Tech. degrees. The Computer Science and Engineering department offers a two-year Master of Computer Application (MCA) and a two-year Master of Science (M.Sc.) in Mathematics and Scientific Computing. The School of Management studies offers a two-year Master of Business Administration (MBA).

MNNIT also offers a Doctor of Philosophy (PhD) programme in Physics, Chemistry, Mathematics and engineering disciplines.

=== Admissions ===
For B.Tech. admissions, candidates have to obtain a rank in the Joint Entrance Examination – Main (JEE Main) exam and then participate in the Joint Seat Allocation Authority (JOSAA) counselling depending on their nationality and eligibility.

Graduate Aptitude Test in Engineering (GATE), NIT MCA Common Entrance Test (NIMCET), Joint Admission Test for Masters (IIT-JAM) ranks are considered for admissions to M.Tech., MCA and M.Sc. programmes respectively.

The admission procedure for the MBA programme is similar to other management institutes in India, wherein the candidates have to submit scores of a written exam (CAT/XAT/MAT/GMAT/CMAT/ATMA), followed by group discussions and personal interviews.

University rankings

General – India
- NIRF (Overall) (2022): 101-150

Engineering – India
- NIRF (2024): 60

=== Ranking ===
MNNIT has been ranked 62nd among engineering colleges as per National Institutional Ranking Framework (NIRF Ranking), 2025. Nature Index ranked MNNIT 130th among research institutes in India in 2024.

== Departments ==
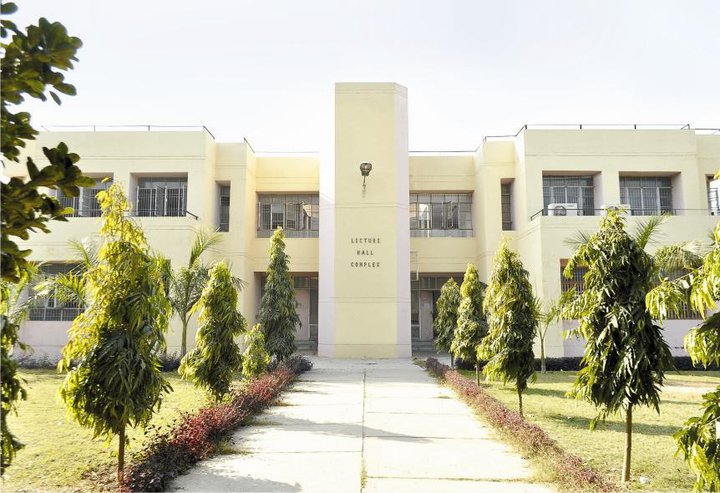
Lecture Hall Complex

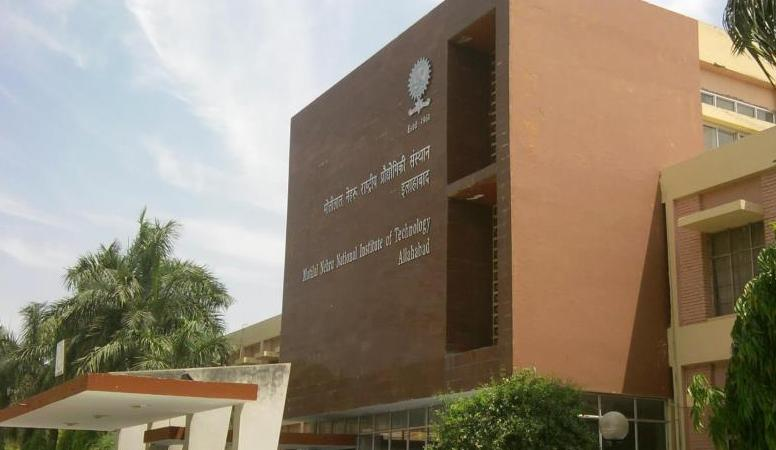
Academic Block

The departments in the institute are:

- Engineering
  - Applied Mechanics
  - Biotechnology
  - Chemical Engineering
  - Computer Science and Engineering
  - Civil Engineering
  - Electrical Engineering
  - Electronics & Communication Engineering
  - Mechanical Engineering
  - Geoinformatics
- Science
  - Chemistry
  - Mathematics
  - Physics
- Humanities and Social Science
- School of Management Studies

== Notable alumni ==
- Sanjiv Chaturvedi, IFoS officer who has exposed many corruption cases in Haryana and AIIMS; received the Presidential reference a record four times and the Ramon Magsaysay award in 2015.
- Deep Joshi, social worker and NGO activist, recipient of the Magsaysay award in 2009
- Onkar Singh, Vice Chancellor of Veer Madho Singh Bhandari Uttarakhand Technical University, Dehradun and Founder Vice Chancellor of Madan Mohan Malaviya University of Technology, Gorakhpur, (U.P.) – India
- Bhrigu Nath Singh – Director General of IITRAM. Professor and former HAL chair professor, Indian Institute of Technology Kharagpur.
- Sapan Saxena, Indian author, best known for his novels Finders, Keepers, UNNS-The Captivation and The Tenth Riddle
- Vinod Kumar Yadav, Director Transport, NCC Limit, Former Chairman & CEO Indian Railway Board

== See also ==
- Culrav, an annual cultural festival
- Indian Institute of Information Technology, Allahabad
