= Shanthanu =

Shanthanu is both a given name and a surname. Notable people with the name include:

- Shanthanu Bhagyaraj (born 1986), Indian actor

== See also ==
- Shantanu (disambiguation)
