= Minister of Civil Aviation =

Minister of Civil Aviation can refer to:

- Ministry of Civil Aviation (India)
- Secretary of State for Transport, the British position called the Minister of Civil Aviation from 1941 to 1959
