= Mahasweta =

Mahasweta is a feminine given name. Notable people with this given name include:

- Mahasweta Devi (1926 – 2016), an Indian writer and activist
- Mahasweta Ray (born 1962), an Indian actress and TV personality
- Mahasweta Chakraborty (born late 1990s), an Indian aircraft pilot
