= Sapan Saxena =

Indian author (born 1985)

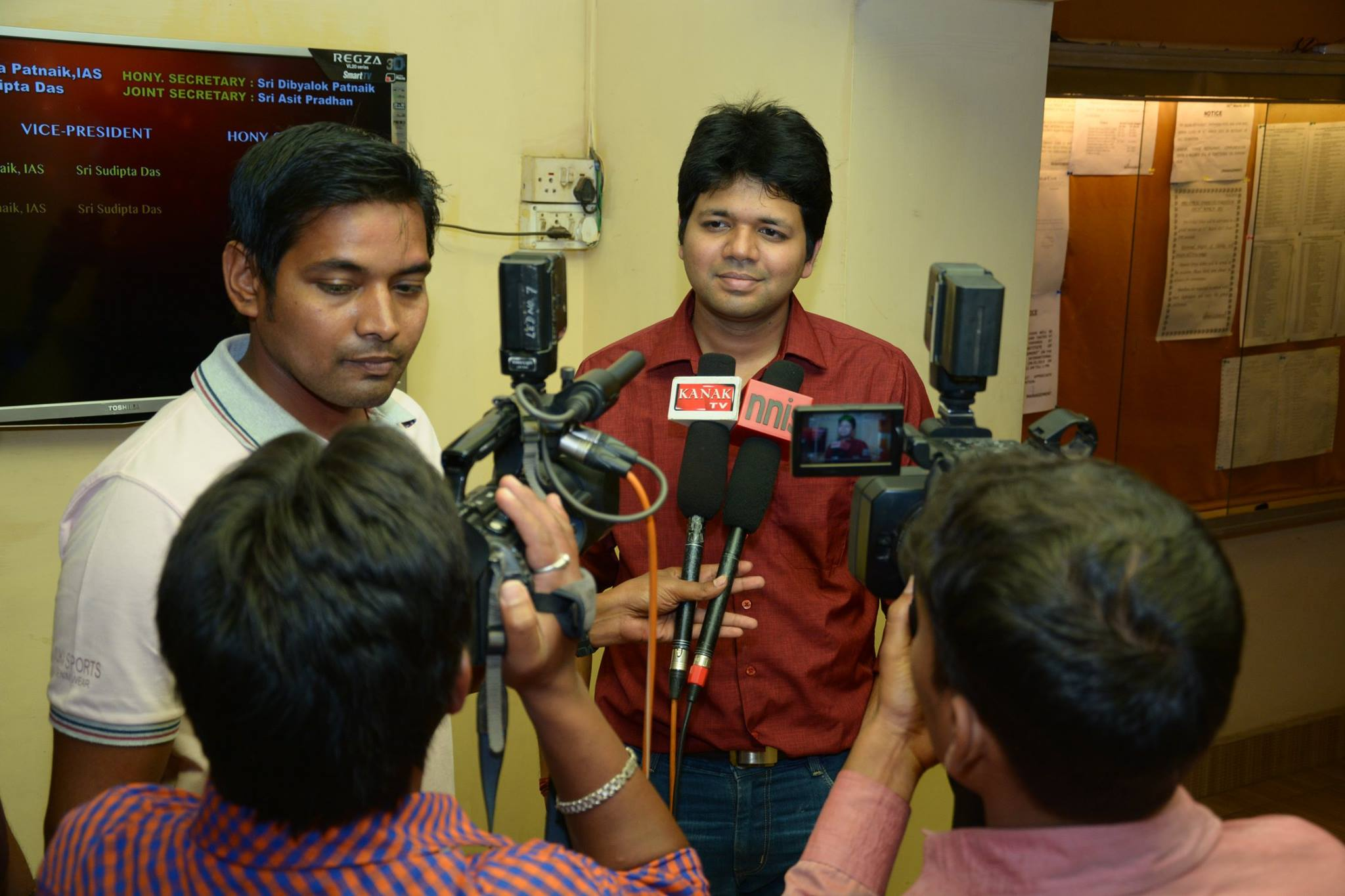
- Sapan Saxena talking to reporters, Bhubaneswar, Odisha.
- Born: 5 April 1985 (age 41); Kanpur, Uttar Pradesh, India
- Education: Motilal Nehru National Institute of Technology Allahabad
- Occupations: Novelist, software engineer
- Writing career
- Genres: Literature, fiction writer, Indian mythology
- Subjects: Novels, short stories
- Notable works: Finders, Keepers; UNNS-The Captivation; The Tenth Riddle

Sapan Saxena (born 5 April 1985) is an Indian writer, known for his novels Finders, Keepers, UNNS-The Captivation and The Tenth Riddle.

== Early life and education ==
Sapan Saxena was born on 5 April 1985, at Kanpur in Uttar Pradesh. His father, Umesh, is a senior bank officer with UCO Bank.

He did his engineering from Motilal Nehru National Institute of Technology Allahabad.

Saxena started writing blogs in the 2011 and his blog was covered by national mainstream media outlets, including The Times of India on a couple of occasions.

He often credits his father and the readers of his blog for pushing him into the world of novels.

== Career ==
=== Software engineer ===
He has worked for fourteen years in the software industry and works with UKG.

=== Writer ===
==== Finders, Keepers ====
Saxena's first novel, Finders, Keepers, was launched in January 2015 at Bhubaneshwar. The launch was covered by The New Indian Express and was attended by Padma Shri Prafulla Kar and novelist Santanu Kumar Acharya and ghazal singer Subhashish Panigrahi.

The book had another launch at the Motilal Nehru National Institute of Technology during the institute's annual cultural festival, Culrav, which was attended by Shri Girdhar Malviya.

The Delhi launch of the book was attended by Bharatiya Janta Party MP from Meerut, Shri Rajendra Agrawal. The Hindu covered the book in its Friday Fever section.

The book received mostly positive reviews from journalists and reviewers.

Samata Dey from IndiaCafe said "Sapan offered a very interesting story, where not only the plot but the atmosphere and the scenario the plot is based in, becomes the primal focus too. Some simple yet very confusing questions are asked in the different parts of the book which are related to the famous historical figures which is mind boggling".

==== UNNS-The Captivation ====
Saxena's second novel's launch was covered by the Chandigarh chapter of The Indian Express and Dainik Bhaskar. The novel was published by Inspire India publishers.

Saxena mentions "The book is a romantic espionage thriller with a basic theme of the Sufi-inspired seven stages of love" when asked about the book. He claims the title UNNS is actually the second stage of love as per Sufi traditions.

In an interview with UC News, Saxena mentioned, "UNNS is a romantic espionage thriller.". In another interview with The News Now, he called the book "A story with a lot of depth and a lot of heart." Saxena also mentioned in his interview with the Hindustan Times that "The story finds inspiration from some stories of that the author witnessed during his education days."

==== The Tenth Riddle ====
In October 2021, Saxena's third book, The Tenth Riddle, was released. It is "a murder mystery backed by the core theme of the sacred feminism, the Adishakti". In his interview with the Asian Chronicle, Saxena said "it's a murder mystery and my protagonists excel in the science of deduction, so a lot of lateral thinking has also been used to solve various pieces of the puzzle.". The Asian Chronicle called the book a "winner" and praised it for its story and suspense.

== Awards and recognition ==
- Listed among Top-50 Most Influential authors by Delhi Wire (2021)

== Bibliography ==
- Finders, Keepers (2015)
- UNNS-The Captivation (2017)
- The Tenth Riddle (2021)

== Rendition of Jabra Fan ==
In March 2016, Saxena did a homemade rendition of Shah Rukh Khan's then-yet-to-be-released movie Fan. The video was released on his YouTube account and was immediately picked up by various media portals.

The video was very well received across social-media platforms and Shah Rukh Khan used his official Twitter account in praise of the video.

== See also ==
- List of Indian writers
- List of novelists
- List of people from Uttar Pradesh
