= The Nine Unknown =

1923 novel by Talbot Mundy

The Nine Unknown is a 1923 novel by Talbot Mundy. Originally serialised in Adventure magazine, it concerns the Nine Unknown Men, a secret society founded to preserve and develop knowledge that would be dangerous to humanity if it fell into the wrong hands. The nine unknown men were entrusted with guarding nine books of secret knowledge.

== Plot ==
The novel's plot centres on a group of American, British and Indian adventurers in India who wish to discover the identities of the mysterious "Nine Unknown". The novel depicts the Nine Men as the embodiment of good who protect the Ancient Wisdom of the Hindu sages. The plot is complicated by the appearance of a group of evildoers (Kali worshippers and Shaktists) who impersonate the true Nine Unknown in order to steal their secrets. The story also features a priest called Father Cyprian who is seeking possession of the books but who wants to destroy them out of Christian piety, and a number of other characters who are interested in learning their contents. The novel features several supernatural events, including the magical cleansing of the River Ganges of pollution.

== Influence ==
The concept of the "Nine Unknown Men" was further popularized by Louis Pauwels and Jacques Bergier in their 1960 book The Morning of the Magicians. They claimed that the Nine Unknown were real and had been founded by the Mauryan Emperor Ashoka around 270 BC. They also claimed that Pope Silvester II had met the Nine Unknown, and that nineteenth-century French colonial administrator and writer Louis Jacolliot insisted on their existence.

== In popular culture ==
- In the first edition of Anton LaVey's Satanic Bible (1969), The Nine Unknown were the final dedicatees mentioned in the dedication.
- The "Nine Unknown" have since been the subject of the several novels including Shadow Tyrants by Clive Cussler and Boyd Morrison; The Mahabharata Secret, a 2013 novel by Christopher C. Doyle; Finders, Keepers, a 2015 novel by Sapan Saxena; and Shobha Nihalani's Nine novel trilogy.
- The American television series Heroes prominently features the number nine, and the writers and producers Aron Coliete and Joe Pakaski have credited the story of Ashoka and The Nine Unknown Men as one of the many influences for the series and as a clue to the mystery surrounding the number.
- JL50 is a Hindi-language sci-fi web series launched in September 2020 on Sony Liv. The series centers around the Nine Unknown and the books they preserved. It relates that these books contain knowledge of political power, the origin of martial arts, communication with extraterrestrial species, and time travel. The series mentions Project A (for Ashoka) which involves time travel.

== See also ==
- Ascended master
- Eight Immortals
- Illuminati
- Navaratnas
- Seven Brahmarshi
- Vaimanika Shastra
- Emperor Ashoka
