= UNNS-The Captivation =

2017 novel by Sapan Saxena

UNNS — The Captivation
- Author: Sapan Saxena
- Language: English
- Subject: Fiction, romance, thriller, espionage
- Publisher: Inspire India Publishers
- Publication date: March 2017
- Publication place: India
- Media type: Print (paperback)
- Pages: 244
- ISBN: 938-57-83874

UNNS — The Captivation is a 2017 novel by Sapan Saxena. The novel depicts international espionage that conflicts with romance. The story spans three countries: India, Germany, and the United States.

== Background ==
Saxena had initially decided to write a sequel to his first book Finders, Keepers, but was persuaded by his family to write a romance novel.

In an interview with Half Baked Beans, Saxena described UNNS as "an unconventional love story".

== Plot summary ==
Atharva Rathod and Meher Qasim fall in love when they are in school. However, Meher abruptly breaks all ties with Atharva and leaves for Germany with no intent to return. Fifteen years later, Atharva travels to Germany on a secret mission, where he meets Meher. The mission ends in failure, and Atharva is imprisoned for twelve years on charges of acting against the Research and Analysis Wing of India. Atharva is freed after serving his full sentence, and his mentor entrusts him with an amateur mission in the United States where he meets Meher once again.

The story is divided across three parts, each named after a season: spring, fall, and winter. Each part is further divided into seven sub-parts, each representing one of the seven stages of love in Urdu and Sufi tradition, ending in death.

== Characters ==
- Atharva Rathod — senior secret agent with the Research and Analysis Wing (RAW) of India
- Meher Qasim — successful entrepreneur involved in the food supply chain business in Germany
- Dev — secret agent of the RAW
- Vasu — director of the RAW
- Ayaz — an orphan whom Atharva sets out to protect

== Reception ==
Anupam Sinha, cartoonist and creator of Super Commando Dhruva, reviewed the book before release and commented that it "will keep you at the edge of your seat".

Indian Express covered the launch in Chandigarh which was attended by Bharatiya Janta Party MP from Meerut, Rajendra Agarwal. The Chandigarh launch was also covered by Daily Post India in its Ludhiana chapter and Hindi daily Punjab Kesari in its Ludhiana chapter.

The book received fair to positive reviews after its launch. Daily Post India called the book truly captivating and commented, "Setting of the story and the sub-plots created all necessary elements." CNI Channel called the book "True to its name" and called it a "chaos of shrewd mind and innocent emotions."

Richa Sharma of Lucknow Bytes said that "The storyline isn't a hardcore tale of romance. It has its own share of thrill, suspense, fight and war." Samata Dey from IndiaCafe said, "Sapan has narrated the story well and managed to balance the element of romance and thrill in a perfect manner ensuring that the readers are not able to put the book down before finishing it." Adarsh Srivastava from Feeble Lines said that the "story moves with a constant pace with flashbacks and current events along with the twist and suspense at the end of almost every chapter". Jaideep Khanduja in Pebbles in the Still Waters said, "There are a good amount of twists in the story. In addition, it is full of suspense."
