= Rajiv Gandhi National Aviation University =

Central university in Amethi, Uttar Pradesh, India

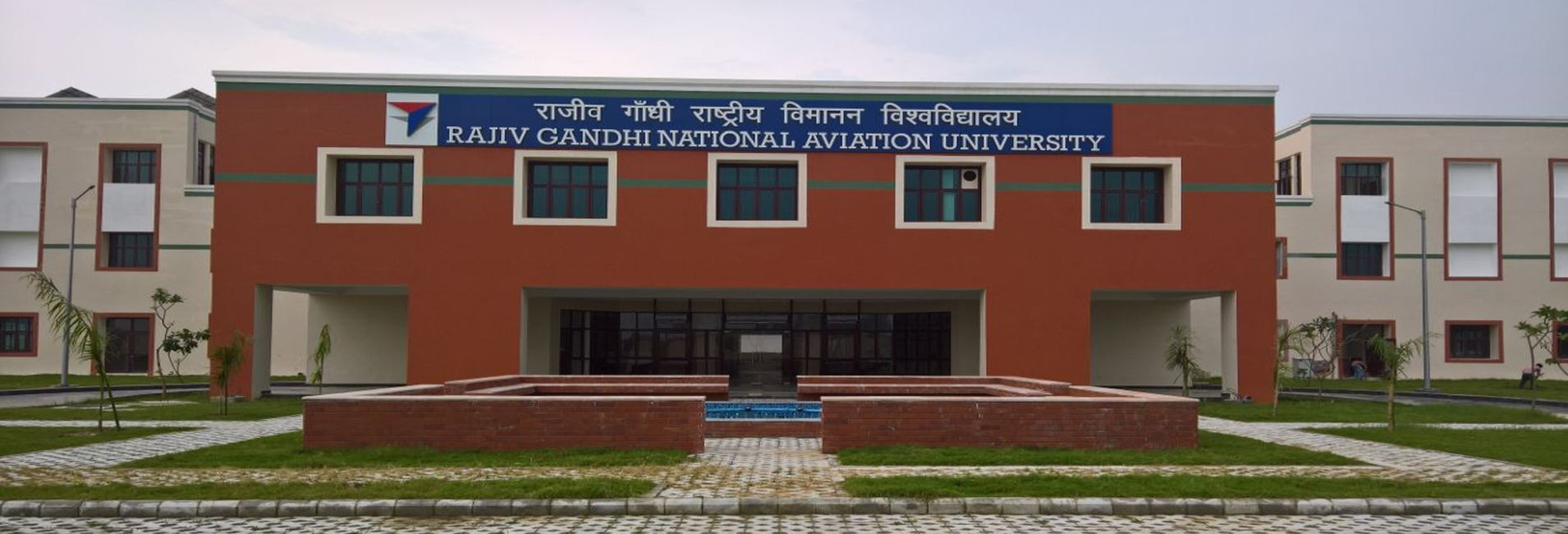
- Main building
- Motto: Learn. Lead. Inspire
- Type: Public
- Established: 2013; 13 years ago
- Academic affiliations: UGC
- Endowment: ₹200 crore+
- Vice-Chancellor: Dr. Bhrigu Nath Singh
- Visitor: President of India
- Location: Amethi district, Uttar Pradesh, India; 26.25118°N 81.3755827°E
- Website: rgnau.ac.in

Rajiv Gandhi National Aviation University (RGNAU) राजीव गांधी राष्ट्रीय विमानन विश्वविद्यालय (आर.जी.एन.ए.यू) is an autonomous Central University at Fursatganj Airfield in Uttar Pradesh, India, for aviation studies and research. It is under the administration of the Ministry of Civil Aviation of the Government of India, constituted by an Act of Parliament in 2013 and physically established in 2018. It is India's first aviation university. First VC AVM Nalin Tandon, and First Registrar Mr Jitendra Singh appointed by the President of India in 2016 & 2019 respectively.

== History ==
On 11 July 2013, the Union Cabinet approved the creation of India's first national aviation university on 26.35 acres of land available at the Indira Gandhi Rashtriya Uran Akademi in Uttar Pradesh, with a project outlay envisaged at ₹202 crore until 2019. On 6 September 2013, the Rajiv Gandhi National Aviation University Bill, 2013 was passed by the Lok Sabha. The bill's object and reason states that the need for the university was felt due to the "marked absence of credible institutions imparting specialised technical and managerial training in air transportation, safety, security and regulatory areas,". The university was planned to expand to 250 acres in the coming phases.

The bill received the assent of the President of India in September 2013. Rajiv Gandhi National Aviation University (RGNAU) was set up as an autonomous central university under the administrative control of the Ministry of Civil Aviation of the Government of India. Air Vice Marshal (retired) Nalin Tandon, a fighter pilot, was appointed as the first vice chancellor. Mr Jitendra Singh (renowned aerospace scientist) was appointed as the first Registrar of RGNAU. Both appointed by the President of India, launched the first course of RGNAU on 5th August 2019.

== Role ==
It was set up with an aim to "facilitate and promote aviation studies, training, research and extension work with focus on emerging areas of studies such as aviation management, aviation regulation and policy, aviation history, aviation science and engineering, aviation law, aviation safety and security, aviation medicine, search and rescue, transportation of dangerous goods, environmental studies and other related fields".

== Administration ==
According to the Act, the university shall have a visitor whose directions are binding, and who will appoint a chancellor and a Vice chancellor. The chancellor will be the head of the university. It also gives powers to establish the court of the university, the Executive Council, the Academic Council, the Board of Affiliation and Recognition, the Boards of Schools, the Finance Committee and other authorities, and also the constitution of a Tribunal of Arbitration for dispute resolution related to contracts between the university and its employees. The annual accounts and balance-sheet of the university shall be audited by the Comptroller and Auditor General of India and shall be laid before the Parliament of India.

The principal committees of the university are the Executive Council and Academic Council, drawing experts and senior officials from the Government, IITs, IIMs, IATA, AAI, etc. The university administration is managed by the vice chancellor and registrar in consultation with the executive council of RGNAU.

== Courses ==
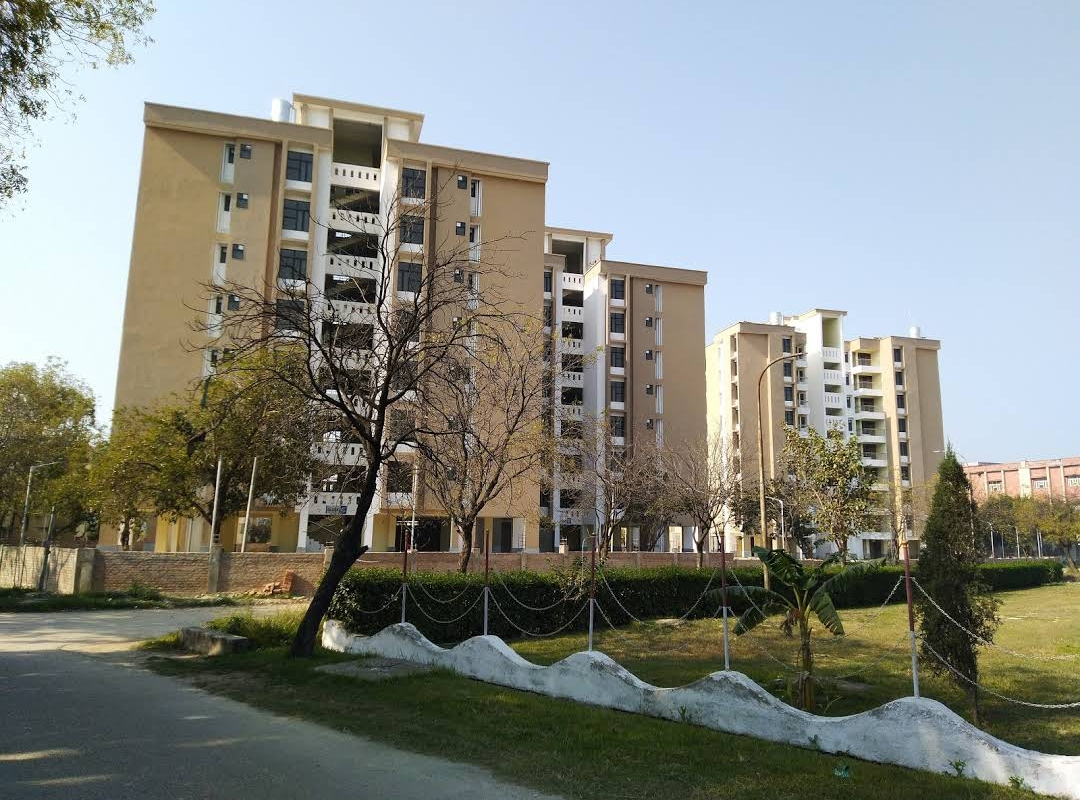
Hostel building at Raebareli

RGNAU launched its first course, the PG Diploma in Airport Operations, in August 2019. Recently, RGNAU introduced five new courses: BBA in Aviation Management, MBA in Aviation Management & Aviation Logistics Management, B.Tech in Aerospace Engineering, and B.Tech in Electronics, Communication Engineering with a specialisation in Avionics and PhD.

- PhD
- Bachelor of Business Administration (BBA) in Aviation Management
- Bachelor of Management Studies (BMS) in Aviation and Air Cargo
- Master of Management Administration (MBA) in Aviation Management
- Master of Management Administration (MBA) in Aviation Logistics Management
- Post-Graduate Diploma in Airport Operations (PGDAO)
- Basic Fire Fighters Course - Certificate course conducted in collaboration with GMR Aviation Academy
- Bachelor of Technology (Aerospace Engineering)
- Bachelor of Technology (Electronics and Communications Engineering - Avionics)

The admissions for B.Tech programs are based on Joint Entrance Examination (JEE) conducted by National Testing Agency (NTA).

== See also ==
- List of pilot training institutes in India
