= Padera =

Padera Pandera
- Gram Panchayat
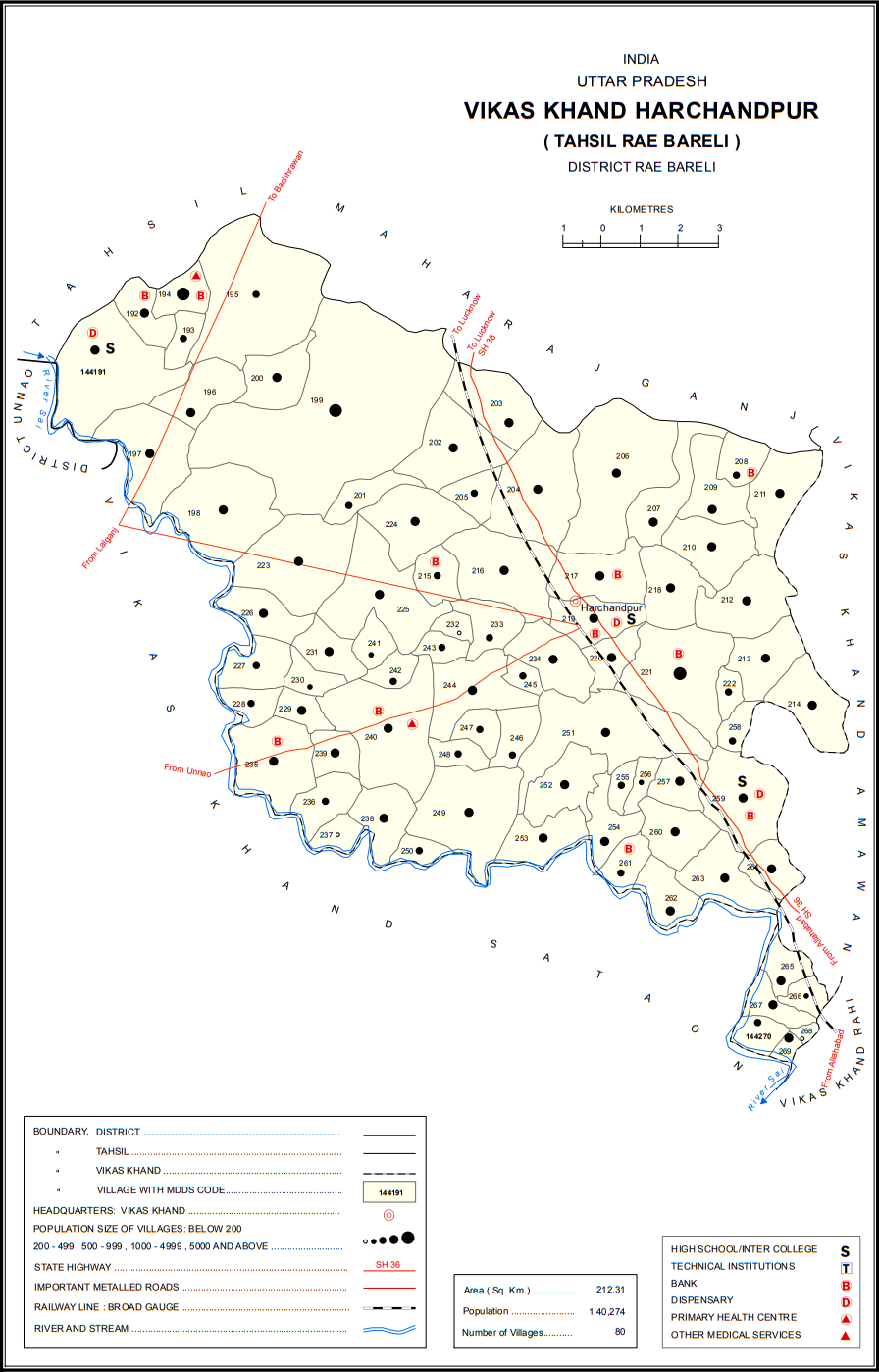
- Map showing Padera (#249) in Harchandpur CD block

- Location within Uttar Pradesh Location within India
- Coordinates: 26.2936°N 81.1364°E
- Country: India
- State: Uttar Pradesh
- Division: Lucknow
- District: Rae Bareli
- Tehsil: Rae Bareli
- Block: Harchandpur
- Police Station: Harchandpur

Government
  - Type: Panchayati Raj
  - Body: Government of Uttar Pradesh
  - CSC Officer: Mr. Anurag Singh
  - Village Head: Mr. Ramakant Singh

Area
  - Total: 4.62 km^{2} (1.78 sq mi)

Population (2011)
  - Total: 3,034
  - Density: 657/km^{2} (1,700/sq mi)

Language
  - Official: Hindi, English

Literacy
  - Literacy: 76.9
- Time zone: UTC+5:30 (IST)
- PIN: 229303
- Telephone code: +91-535
- Vehicle registration: UP-33
- Post Office: Padera B.O.
- Sex ratio: 934 ♂/ 1000♀
- Website: raebareli.nic.in

Padera, also spelled Pandera, is a village in Harchandpur block of Raebareli district, Uttar Pradesh, India. As of 2011, its population is 3,034, in 564 households. It has one primary school and no healthcare facilities.

Padera is also a Gram Panchayat under the district of Raebareli. The Pin Code of the village is 229303 and there are 5 village under Padera. A Government Agriculture Area is also situated in Padera semi-urban village.

== About Padera ==
According to Census 2011 information the location code or village code of Padera Gram Panchayat is 144249. Padera semi-urban village is located in Raebareli Tehsil of Raebareli district in Uttar Pradesh, India. It is situated 12 km away from Raebareli via Gangaganj Route and 60 km away from Lucknow (45 Min Drive from Lucknow), which is both district & sub-district headquarter of Padera semi-urban village. Padera Gram Panchayat has a total population of 4,600 peoples. There are about 664 houses in Padera semi-urban village. Padera semi-urban village sits on the South shore of the Sai River. Raebareli is nearest city to Padera.

== Demographic history ==
The 1961 census recorded Padera (as "Pandera") as comprising 5 hamlets, with a total population of 1,189 people (619 male and 570 female), in 258 households and 233 physical houses. The area of the village was given as 1,144 acres.

The 1981 census recorded Padera (as "Pandera") as having a population of 1,796 people, in 301 households, and having an area of 459.33 hectares. The main staple foods were given as wheat and rice.

== Transport ==
=== Bus ===
The nearest Bus station is Achleshwar Market (2.5 km) and Harchandpur (10 km) and UPSRTC buses also run here.

=== Rail ===
The nearest Railway Station is Rae Bareli (14 km) and Harchandpur (10 km).

=== Air ===
The nearest Airport is Raebareli Airport (24 km) and Lucknow International Airport (65 km).
