= Finders, Keepers (Saxena novel) =

2015 novel by Sapan Saxena

- Author: Sapan Saxena
- Language: English
- Subject: Shiva, Myth, Fantasy, Indian History
- Publisher: Leadstart Publishing Pvt Ltd
- Publication date: January 2015
- Publication place: India
- Media type: Print (Paperback)
- Pages: 640
- ISBN: 978-93-84027-54-4

Finders, Keepers is a novel by Sapan Saxena. The story takes place at various places of spiritual importance in the Indian subcontinent starting from Allahabad. The novel deals with a conflict between a newly active historical sect worshipping Shiva and a powerful secret organization, the Nine Unknown Men.

== Plot summary ==
A murder takes place in the town of Haridwar. The victim is a history professor who has little or no affinity with the place. The killer is unknown but has left some religious symbols on the naked body of the professor which is found a few kilometers from the place of murder. A week later, another murder takes place in similar circumstances in the holy town of Srikakulam. Troubled by the murder of two of his most trusted allies and by two subsequent heists in Kolkata and Bikaner, the working head of National Society for Hindu Consciousness, Mrityunjai Pradhan turns to the Intelligence Bureau of India for help with the case.

== Characters ==
Shoumik Haldar – Deputy Director of the Information Bureau of India.

Ishan Vajpayee – An author.

Mrityunjai Pradhan – A philosopher and the head of a secret organization called the Nine Unknown Men.

Markandey Trivedi – A very simple and honest man who has taken a wrong turn towards murder in his blind devotion towards Shiva.

Surbhi Sinha – Young MLA with great alchemical ability.

== Reception ==
The New Indian Express covered the launch in Bhubaneshwar which was attended by Padma Shri Prafulla Kar and novelist Santanu Kumar Acharya and ghazal singer Subhashish Panigrahi. The Allahabad launch, which took place at Motilal Nehru National Institute of Technology during their cultural festival, Culrav was attended by the grandson of Madan Mohan Malviya. The Delhi launch of the book was attended by Bharatiya Janta Party MP from Meerut, Rajendra Agarwal. The Hindu covered the book in its Friday Fever section.

Dinesh Misra from Amar Ujala said, "The book forces people to question their existence and their history which was taken for granted all along the time. The writer however has skipped certain explanations in the book." Misra was critical of the size of the book and its simple writing style. Suraj Chand Rajwar from Book Review India said, "It's a thick book full of mythological puzzles that dazzles you with mythological doses and at the edge thriller". Samata Dey from IndiaCafe said "Sapan offered a very interesting story, where not only the plot but the atmosphere and the scenario the plot is based in, becomes the primal focus too. Some simple yet very confusing questions are asked in the different parts of the book which are related to the famous historical figures which is mind boggling."

Archita from Book Adorers wrote "Lovers of mysteries and the ones with a knack of questioning can get to experience a journey filled with euphoria by reading this book. Length and title-less chapters are no excuse to not reading the book. A must read!"
