= Santanu (disambiguation) =

Santanu may refer to:

- Santanu Kumar Acharya (born 1933), Indian writer
- Santanu Bhattacharya (born 1958), Indian chemist

== See also ==
- Shantanu (disambiguation)
