= ICTACEM =

Indian professional engineering organization

International Conference on Theoretical, Applied, Computational and Experimental Mechanics
- Founded: December 1, 1998
- Founder: P.K. Sinha
- Type: Professional Organization
- Location: Kharagpur, West Bengal, India
- Method: Conferences, Publications
- Members: 250
- Key people: B.N. Singh (Chairperson); D. K. Maiti
- Website: www.ictacem.org

The International Conference on Theoretical, Applied, Computational and Experimental Mechanics (ICTACEM) is a professional organization in the field of engineering. The organization was founded by P.K. Sinha, a professor of aerospace engineering at the Indian Institute of Technology Kharagpur as the "Conference on Theoretical applied, Computation and experimental mechanics" in 1998, and its current name was adopted in 2001. The first conference was held on December 1, 1998.

Since then, the organization has consisted of more than 250 committee members and delegates. The conference has been held every three years since 1998, with the latest taking place in 2021 (delayed from 2020).

== Conference themes ==
- Fluid Mechanics
- Solid Mechanics and Dynamics
- Flight Mechanics, Control, and Navigation
- Propulsion and Combustion
