= Indira Gandhi Rashtriya Uran Akademi =

Public central flying school in India

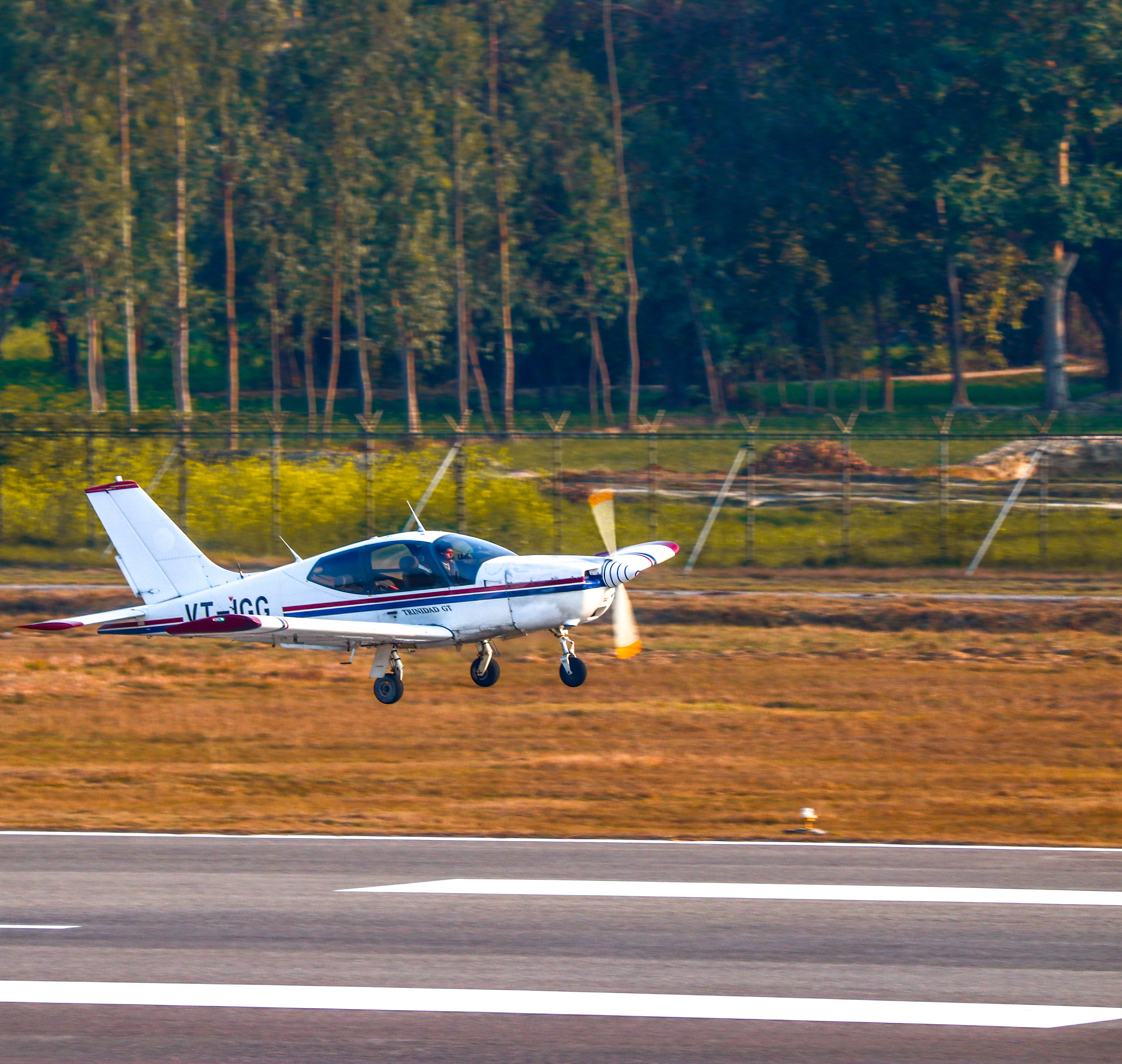
- IGRUA's Trinidad TB-20 aircraft taking off
- Motto: "Provide wings to dreams"
- Type: Public
- Established: 7 November 1985; 41 years ago
- Accreditation: Directorate General of Civil Aviation (DGCA)
- Academic affiliations: Dr. Ram Manohar Lohia Avadh University (B.Sc)
- Director: Air Cmde. Vipul Singh
- Ex-officio chairman: Rajiv Bansal (Secretary, Ministry of Civil Aviation)
- Students: 125 (CPL, 2023)
- Location: Fursatganj Airfield, Amethi district, Uttar Pradesh, 229302, India; 26.2505°N 81.3767°E
- Campus: Urban
- Website: igrua.gov.in

The Indira Gandhi Rashtriya Uran Akademi (lit. Indira Gandhi National Flying Academy) is a public pilot training institute located at Fursatganj Airfield in Uttar Pradesh, India. Established in 1985, it is an autonomous institution under the Ministry of Civil Aviation, Government of India.

== History ==
IGRUA was established by the Government of India in 1985 at Fursatganj Airfield as an autonomous institution under the Societies Registration Act, 1860, administered by a Governing Council under the ex-officio chairmanship of Secretary, Ministry of Civil Aviation.

The institute initially offered training for both commercial pilot license (CPL) for fixed-wing aircraft and commercial helicopter pilot license (CHPL) for rotary-wing aircraft.

== Infrastructure ==
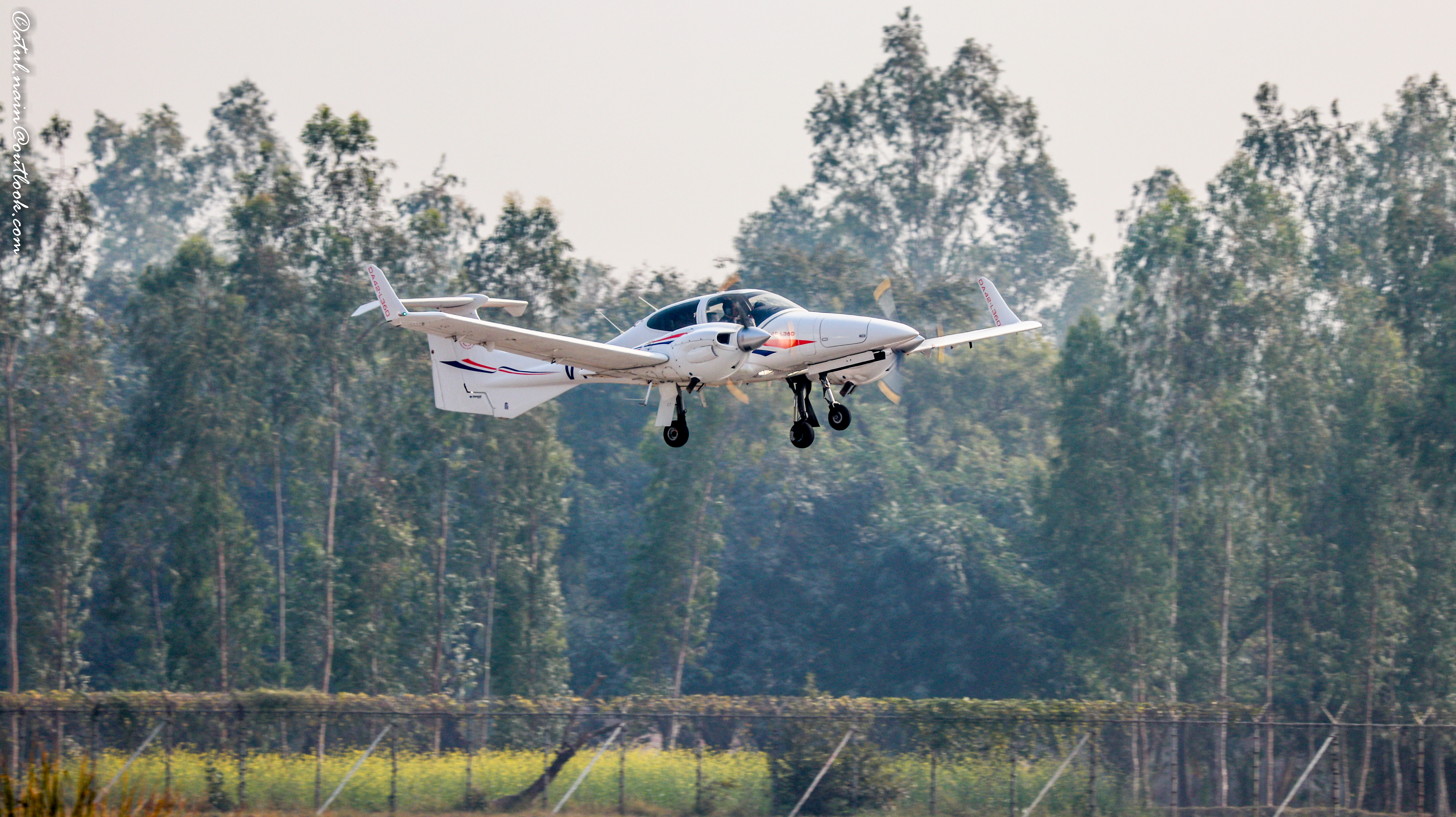
IGRUA's Diamond DA42 twin-engine aircraft taking off.

IGRUA's infrastructure consists of its own independent airfield and airspace, 6080 feet runway, taxiway, apron, air traffic control, navigation and landing aids, hangars, fire fighting, aviation fuel station, hostels/mess, residential campus, sports facilities, auditorium among others.

IGRUA has three flying operations bases, one is its own Fursatganj Airfield, Uttar Pradesh, one in Gondia, Maharashtra, and other at Kalaburagi Airport, Karnataka. Flight training base is shifted to Gondia and Kalaburagi during winter season.

In 2013, the Ministry of Civil Aviation proposed a National Aviation University to be set up within the IGRUA compound. Rajiv Gandhi National Aviation University opened in 2018.

== Courses ==
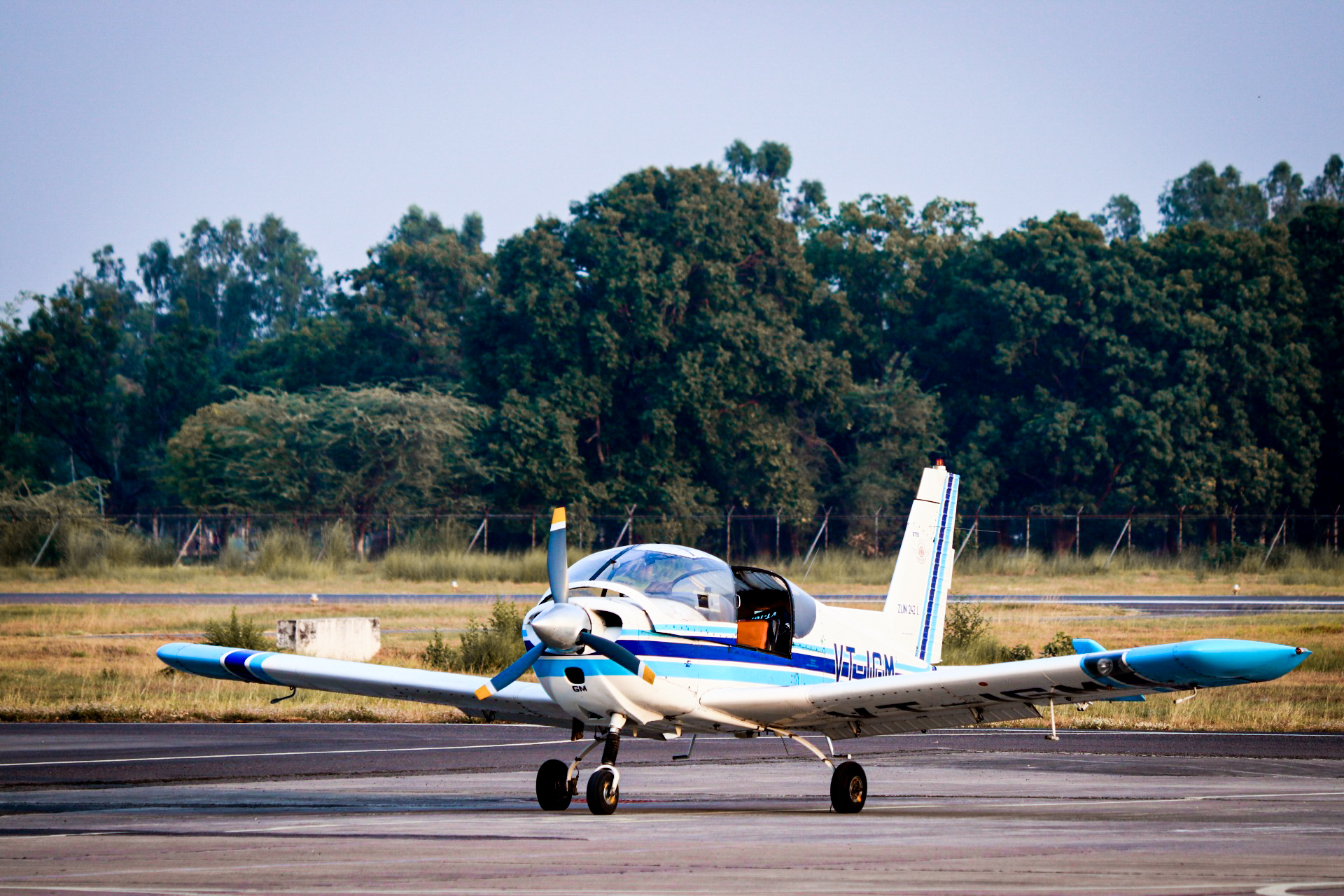
IGRUA's Zlín Z242 L single-engine aircraft parked at apron.

IGRUA conducts all-India entrance examinations for selection of cadets, shortlisted candidates then undergo pilot aptitude test / WOMBAT and finally a personal interview. Government's Press Information Bureau describes IGRUA as the "IIT of aviation".

The institution conducts flying training leading to the award of commercial pilot license. IGRUA also offers ancillary courses such as multi-crew cooperation and crew resource management. IGRUA is also one of the approved institutes to carry out Certified Flying Instructors Refresher course by Ministry of Civil Aviation for Chief Flight Instructors, Flight Instructors, and Assistant Flight Instructors.

IGRUA also offers their commercial pilot license cadets the opportunity to pursue a three-year B.Sc. degree in aviation concurrently. Prior to 2021, this program was affiliated with Chhatrapati Shahu Ji Maharaj University, but as of 2022, the degree program is affiliated with Dr. Ram Manohar Lohia Avadh University.

IGRUA also conducts drone training for RPAS pilots, and English Language Proficiency course. On-job practical training are given to students undergoing diploma in aeronautical engineering and Aircraft Maintenance Engineering.

Besides training IGRUA's own cadets, the campus also gives pilot training to cadets of Indian Air Force, Indian Navy, Indian Coast Guard, Border Security Force, and Indian airlines.

IGRUA has been a site for campus placements by various airlines, including Air India, IndiGo, and Air India Express. In 2005, Qatar Airways made a few recruitments as part of bilateral negotiations between India and Qatar.

== Collaborations ==
In 2007, IGRUA signed a management contract with CAE Inc. to manage IGRUA's flight school activities, including maintenance of aircraft, flying operations, air traffic control, runway, NAV aids, fire fighting facilities, medical facilities, security, staff and student facilities, and transportation.

Delhi-based remote pilot training organization, Drone Destination, in association with IGRUA, opened four drone pilot training schools in India situated in Gurgaon, Bengaluru, Gwalior, and Dharamshala. In 2021, IGRUA signed a memorandum of understanding with Indian Aviation Academy to "impart quality education to budding pilots and prepare them for regulatory examination". In 2022, Boeing made a strategic collaboration with IGRUA "to further emphasize safety and quality to aspiring airline cadets". In the same year, IGRUA signed MoU with the Tamil Nadu Industrial Development Corporation (TIDCO) and De Drone World Solutions, with a target to produce 2500 drone pilots a year.

In Aero India 2023 exhibition, IGRUA signed a MoU with Flight Simulation Technique Centre (FSTC) to give type rating training to their cadets in Airbus A320, Boeing 737, ATR 72, and Q-400 aircraft.

== Fleet ==
The IGRUA fleet comprises 13 aircraft, consisting of 11 Diamond DA40 and two Diamond DA42.

In the 2021–22 academic year, IGRUA achieved its highest-ever flying hours with a fleet of 18 aircraft, totaling 19,110 hours. The per aircraft utilization also reached 1062 hours per annum. This surpassed the previous record set in 2013–14, where 18,776 flying hours were logged with 24 aircraft, resulting in an average of 782 hours per aircraft.

== Alumni ==
- Mahasweta Chakraborty

== See also ==
- List of pilot training institutes in India
