= Bhrigu Nath Singh =

Professor at IIT Kharagpur

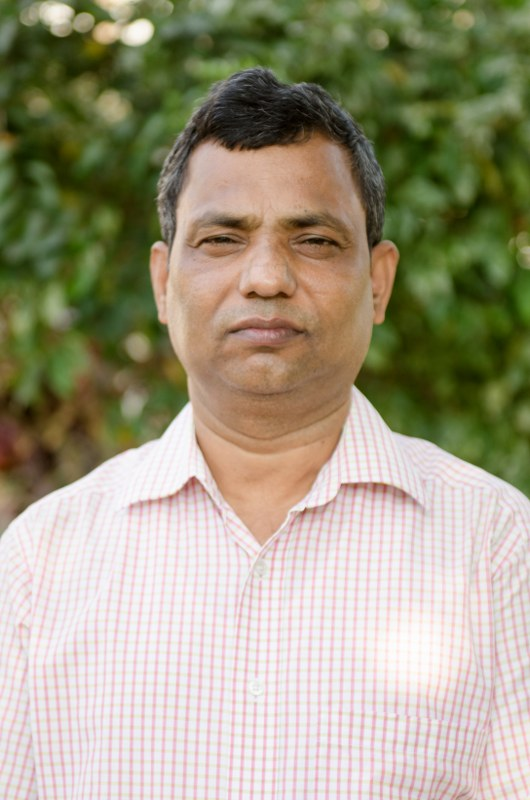
- B.N. Singh at IIT Kharagpur

Vice-chancellor at Rajiv Gandhi National Aviation University
- Incumbent
- Assumed office 22 August 2024

Director general at IITRAM
- In office 22 May 2023 – 21 August 2024
- Preceded by: Dr. Amit Prashant
- Succeeded by: M. K. Barua

Professor at Indian Institute of Technology Kharagpur
- In office 2004–present

Personal details
- Born: 1 July 1968 (age 58) Ballia, Uttar Pradesh, India
- Education: Wright State University; Indian Institute of Technology Kanpur; MNNIT Allahabad
- Profession: Professor
- Known for: Finite element method, solid mechanics & composite material
- Website: IIT Kharagpur; Office of the VC, RGNAU

Bhrigu Nath Singh, also known as B.N. Singh, is an Indian engineering scientist, current vice-chancellor at Rajiv Gandhi National Aviation University and former director general at the IITRAM.

He is a professor, former HAL chair professor and the first dean of Human Resources (2016-2020) at Indian Institute of Technology Kharagpur. He is chair of the ICTACEM and former Head of Department Aerospace Engineering, IIT Kharagpur.

He is a notable alumnus of MNNIT, Allahabad, and received the distinguished alumni award in 2024. He was one of the delegates of Aerospace Industry-Academia Conclave, HAL.

== Early life and education ==
Singh earned a Ph.D. in Aerospace Engineering at IIT Kanpur. He obtained his post-doctorate fellowship from Wright State University in 2003.

== Career ==
Prior to joining IIT Kharagpur as an assistant professor in 2004, Singh was a faculty member of MNNIT Allahabad. He has addressed several problems in aerospace structures with particular focus on geometric and material nonlinearity and uncertainty. Singh has over 130 research papers published and has given numerous national and international talks. He has supervised over 21 Ph.D. and 61 MTech students. He has handled several defense projects for the Government of India. He has organized three ICTACEM, an international conference which more than 250 delegates from India and abroad attend.

Singh is a leading researcher in the field of uncertainty quantification and has been published by some highly-rated journals.

Singh is a fellow of Indian Society for Technical Education and an elected fellow of the Institute of Engineers (India). He was listed among the authors of the top most cited papers in International Journal of Finite Elements in Analysis and Design in 2014. Some of his papers were listed among the most downloaded research papers in International Journal of Mechanical Sciences (2014).
