= JL50 =

Indian web series

- promotional poster
- Genre: Sci-fi Thriller
- Created by: Shailender Vyas
- Written by: Shailender Vyas
- Directed by: Shailender Vyas
- Starring: Abhay Deol; Pankaj Kapur; Ritika Anand; Piyush Mishra; Arindam Saha; Rajesh Sharma
- Composer: Aseem Trivedi
- Country of origin: India
- Original language: Hindi
- No. of seasons: 1
- No. of episodes: 4

Production
- Producers: Ritika Anand; Abhayanand Singh; Piiyush Singh; Bob Gaider; Yasmin Gaider; Shailender Vyas
- Running time: 31–42 Minutes
- Production companies: Vision 20 Entertainment Inc.; Golden Ratio films; Flying Dragon Entertainment

Original release
- Network: Sony Liv
- Release: 4 September 2020

JL50 is an Indian Hindi-language sci-fi thriller streaming television miniseries which premiered on Sony Liv on 4 September 2020. The series stars Abhay Deol, Pankaj Kapur, Ritika Anand, Piyush Mishra, Rajesh Sharma and Arindam Saha as Mr. Bose in guest appearance.

== Plot ==
Shantanu, a Central Bureau of Investigation (CBI) officer is called in to investigate a plane crash in a remote area of West Bengal. News flashes that a militant group has hijacked a plane with many dignitaries. Initially, CBI suspects that the crashed plane is the same one that has been hijacked. However, Shantanu and his colleague Gaurango are baffled to find that the crashed plane is Flight JL50, which went missing 35 years ago. When much evidence indicates that the plane is actually 35 years old, Shantanu still feels that this has been somehow staged. During the crash, the cockpit breaks from the main plane and crashes separately having two survivors; all of the other passengers died. The two survivors are pilot Bihu Ghosh and professor Biswajit Chandra Mitra. When Bihu wakes up, she is surprised to see the whole world has changed. Mitra is jubilant and demands celebration and since doctors assume he is mentally unstable, they sedate him.

Shantanu finds information about Mitra, his works as professor and his inclination towards the communist ideology. He visits his home for enquiry and finds plan drawings of plane in Mitra's old files. Through a University professor, he learns that Mitra was working on a "Project A". Centuries ago when Emperor Ashoka witnessed the Kalinga War, he was deeply moved by it and adopted non-violent Buddhism, he used to call it DhammaVijaya . He collected all the information on science and technology which he felt were harmful if left with mankind and buried them. One such secret was of time-travel on which Mitra's father was working since the British era. However, post independence, his funding were reduced and Mitra continued his work further. Shantanu gets info that Subroto Das was Mitra's assistant and confidant.

Upon further enquiry to Das, he reveals Mitra's plan which involved hijacking a plane and travelling through a wormhole. Through the code breaking in Project A, Mitra had discovered the coordinates of a wormhole which were in the sky. But due to some miscalculations, the plane went 35 years ahead in time and landed now and accidentally crashed. Shantanu is in two minds when Professor Das, a quantum physics expert, tries to persuade him that it is a case of time travel and that they must fly back in time to the past via the same wormhole and prevent the hijacking by Mitra. He tells Shantanu that he can prove it if they go to the same coordinates which Bihu Ghosh had flown into. Das further promises that if they go back in time and stop the plane from taking off, the crash would never happen in the present day and the other plane AO26 would not get hijacked. He further assures that the demands of the hijackers to free their political leader would not have to be dealt with in the present. Bihu agrees and they fly back into the past and inadvertently change the future.

The concluding episode shows Shantanu, Professor Das and Bihu Ghosh travelling back to August 1984. They are able to stop Professor Mitra—via a shootout in a ramshackled factory godown—from boarding JL50, hence preventing the flight from getting hijacked and further, preventing its crash in the year 2019. This also means that everything in the moment from then on changes, providing a completely different and alternate future.

It is also revealed in the last episode of the series that Shantanu was left at an orphanage when he was only 15 days old. He visits the orphanage and witnesses an elderly man abandoning an infant and identifies that it is he who is the baby. Earlier episodes reveal that Bihu is told she had given birth to a stillborn out of wedlock. However, in the last episode he sees that the car Bihu gets from her house when they go to stop Prof. Mitra, has the same number-plate as the older man's who had come to abandon the infant at the orphanage the previous night—thus making Shantanu realize that Bihu is his own Mother and the older man was his grandfather. The subsequent hijack and disappearance of flight JL50 and Bihu along with it in 1984 means that Shantanu grows up an orphan and goes on to join the CBI. But before Shantanu can reveal this reality from the year 2019 to Bihu outside the godown, the time changes and their lives change.

The ending sequences show Shantanu travelling in AO26 with his wife, and their plane is not hijacked. In fact, no plane is hijacked as the villains of the series were killed back in 1984 in the godown shootout. Characters of Shantanu and Gaurango (the CBI officials and friends in the earlier episodes) even run into each other in the plane but do not greet each other. This means that the two never became friends in this alternate reality and probably Shantanu did not even get to join the CBI. It is also shown that Bihu's mother feels guilty about lying to her about the stillborn and thus reveals the orphanage where the baby was abandoned. The new, alternate reality ending sequence shows Shantanu calling a now aged Bihu his mother and asking her, “had grandmother not told you that I was at this orphanage, how would you have taken me back?” Meaning, since Shantanu was able to kill Professor Mitra, the course of everyone's future changed altogether. Thus, the JL50 that Bihu had piloted in 1984 never got hijacked, she never went missing and hence she never went 35 years into the future via time-travel. Instead, she recovered Shantanu back from the orphanage thus allowing him to grow up as a normal child with his own birth mother, rather than as an orphan. This worked out very well for Shantanu in the alternate reality as he is now shown so much happier, content and peaceful rather than the orphaned and hence disturbed, morose, hurt CBI official of the earlier episodes from a different reality.

The final scene shows an elderly Bihu and Shantanu in 2019—both empathetic, happy and grateful—distributing gifts on his recovery-day, to the orphans at that same orphanage. Shantanu is the only person who has a recollection of both the parallel, alternate realities that diverged from 1984 till 2019. In the end credits at 5 pm in 1984, it is 22 years Das from the year 1984 walks into the warehouse and picks the unburnt portion of the papers.

== Cast ==
- Abhay Deol as Shantanu
- Pankaj Kapur as Professor Subroto Das
- Ritika Anand as Bihu Ghosh
- Piyush Mishra as Biswajit Chandra Mitra
- Rajesh Sharma as Gaurango
- Arindam Saha as Mr. Bose (Guest appearance)

== Production ==
Producer Ritika Anand, who also plays the pilot in the series, has said that the series was created "with an aim to create a very desi, Indian science-fiction film and create a genre, different from how the west makes science fiction films." The project was originally envisioned as a film, however due to delays in the release and subsequently COVID-19 pandemic in India, it was released as a web series.

== Episodes ==
No.	Title	Directed by	Written by	Original release date
1	"The Crash"	Shailender Vyas	Shailender Vyas	September 4, 2020
2	"The Conspiracy"	Shailender Vyas	Shailender Vyas	September 4, 2020
3	"The Unfolding"	Shailender Vyas	Shailender Vyas	September 4, 2020
4	"The Other Plan"	Shailender Vyas	Shailender Vyas	September 4, 2020

== Reception ==
The series received mixed to positive reviews. The Times of India rated it 3 out of 5 stars and summarised it as "JL50 is a culmination of mythology, warfare, history and science but it needed an in-depth handling which the plot-line unfortunately started to lack right after the very first episode." Hindustan Times also rated it positively and said, "JL50 offers an interesting story, innovative fusion of Indian storytelling with science fiction and brilliant performances from the entire cast. However, it is in the execution that the film fails quite often." The Indian Express' Shubhra Gupta commended the show "for its attempt to construct a back-to-the-future vibe, and some nice flourishes; you just wish it was better done overall." NDTV's Saibal Chatterjee gave it 2 out of 5 stars and praised Deol and Kapur's performances but pointed to inconsistencies in the show and noted that "the show swims in shallow waters."

== See also ==
- The Nine Unknown, novel by Talbot Mundy, source of the fictional secret society of Ashoka featured in the series
