= Civil Aviation Department MG-1 =

Indian motor glider

MG-1

General information
- Type: Two seat motor glider
- National origin: India
- Manufacturer: Technical Centre, Civil Aviation Department
- Number built: 1

History
- First flight: 30 May 1983

The Civil Aviation Department MG-1 was a one-off Indian motor glider, seating two side by side and first flown in 1983.

== Design and development ==
Design work on the MG-1 began in October 1981. It was a low wing monoplane with spruce and plywood wings with a forward sweep of 1.5° at quarter chord mounted with 3.25° of dihedral. The ailerons were fabric covered; there were no flaps but wooden airbrakes extended above and below the wing. The cantilever, unswept empennage was similarly constructed and the low set tailplane carried elevators with a trim tab on the starboard side.

The fuselage of the MG-1 was steel framed and fabric covered with the exception of a glass fibre engine cowling. This housed a conventionally nose mounted, 74.5 kW (100 hp) flat four Continental O-200 piston engine driving a non-retractable propeller. Its cockpit seated two side by side under a rearward sliding canopy. The conventional undercarriage had main wheels with rubber cord shock absorbers and brakes, assisted by a steerable tailwheel.

Only one MG-1 was built. It made its first flight on 30 May 1983 and gained certification in December 1985.

== Specifications ==
All performance data are at maximum take-off weight

Data from Jane's All the World's Aircraft 1986/87

General characteristics

- Crew: 2
- Length: 8.00 m (26 ft 3 in)
- Wingspan: 16.50 m (54 ft 2 in)
- Height: 2.50 m (8 ft 2 in) in flying attitude
- Wing area: 21.83 m^{2} (235.0 sq ft)
- Airfoil: Wortmann FX-61-184
- Empty weight: 560 kg (1,235 lb) equipped
- Max takeoff weight: 748 kg (1,649 lb)
- Fuel capacity: 60 L (13.2 Imp gal; 15.8 US gal)
- Powerplant: 1 × Rolls-Royce Continental O-200-A flat four, 75 kW (100 hp)
- Propellers: 2-bladed Hoffmann V62R/170Y, 1.70 m (5 ft 7 in) diameter adjustable pitch

Performance

- Maximum speed: 245 km/h (152 mph, 132 kn) power off, smooth air
- Cruise speed: 160 km/h (99 mph, 86 kn) economical, 75% power
- Stall speed: 62 km/h (39 mph, 33 kn) powered; 70 km/h (44 mph; 38 kn) power off
- Range: 500 km (310 mi, 270 nmi) maximum fuel
- Service ceiling: 4,575 m (15,010 ft) service
- g limits: 5.3/-2.65 power off
- Maximum glide ratio: 26:1 at 105 km/h (65 mph; 57 kn), power off
- Rate of climb: 6.0 m/s (1,180 ft/min)
- Rate of sink: 1.0 m/s (200 ft/min) minimum, at 90 km/h (56 mph; 49 kn), power off
- Wing loading: 34.3 kg/m^{2} (7.0 lb/sq ft) maximum
- Take-off run: 170 m (558 ft)
- Landing run: 135 m (443 ft)

== See also ==
- Civil Aviation Department Revathi
