= Samir Kumar Sinha =

Civil Aviation Secretary of India

Samir Kumar Sinha IAS

Secretary of Ministry of Civil Aviation
- Incumbent
- Assumed office 18 August 2025
- Appointed by: Appointments Committee of the Cabinet
- Preceded by: Vumlunmang Vualnam

Personal details
- Born: 16 November 1969 (age 56) Bihar, India
- Education: (B.A) Hindu College, Delhi Delhi University (MBA) IIM Ahmedabad
- Occupation: Civil servant

Samir Kumar Sinha (born 16 November 1969) is an Indian Administrative Service officer of the 1994 batch of Assam cadre. Currently he is serving as Secretary of Ministry of Civil Aviation. Before that he served as Additional Secretary & Director General (Acquisition) in the Department of Defence.

== Early life and education ==
Samir Kumar was born on 16 November 1969 in Bihar. He holds a master's degree in history from the Delhi University and also a PG Diploma in Public Management and Policy from IIM Ahmedabad.

== Works ==
Samir Kumar Sinha has been a member of the Indian Administrative Service since 1994. Sinha began his administrative career as an Assistant Commissioner in the Cachar district. Over the years, he has held several key positions across Assam, including Sub-Divisional Officer (Sadar) in Kokrajhar, Sub-Divisional Officer (Civil) in Bijni, and Staff Officer to the Chief Secretary of Assam. He has also served as Deputy Commissioner in both Tinsukia and Kamrup district.

In addition to these roles, he has held prominent positions in the Government of Assam, such as Finance Secretary, Principal Secretary, Health Secretary, and Additional Chief Secretary to the Chief Minister.
