= Hindustan Ardhra =

Pilot Training Sailplane

ATS-1 Ardhra

General information
- Type: Training sailplane
- Manufacturer: Civil Aviation Department of India, Hindustan Aeronautics

History
- First flight: 5 March 1979

The Hindustan Ardhra (lit. 'The Moist One') was a sailplane designed in India for pilot training by the government's Civil Aviation Department in the late 1970s as the ATS-1 Ardhra. It was a two-seat aircraft of conventional configuration and wooden construction. The Indian Air Force ordered fifty examples in the early 1980s to be produced by Hindustan Aeronautics and the type was approved for use for flying by cadets.

== Operators ==
India

- Indian Air Force

== Specifications ==
Data from Jane's All the World's Aircraft 1988-89

General characteristics

- Crew: 2
- Length: 8.61 m (28 ft 3 in)
- Wingspan: 16.5 m (54 ft 2 in)
- Height: 2.464 m (8 ft 1 in)
- Wing area: 21.83 m^{2} (235.0 sq ft)
- Aspect ratio: 12.5
- Airfoil: Wortmann FX-61-184
- Empty weight: 328 kg (723 lb)
- Max takeoff weight: 508 kg (1,120 lb)

Performance

- Stall speed: 61 km/h (38 mph, 33 kn)
- Never exceed speed: 210 km/h (130 mph, 110 kn)
- g limits: +5.3 -2.65
- Maximum glide ratio: 26
- Rate of sink: 0.78 m/s (154 ft/min)
- Wing loading: 17.32 kg/m^{2} (3.55 lb/sq ft)
