= Ministry of Civil Aviation (India) =

Government ministry of India

- Branch of Government of India

- Ministry of Civil Aviation

Agency overview
- Formed: 1947; 79 years ago
- Jurisdiction: Government of India
- Headquarters: Rajiv Gandhi Bhawan New Delhi
- Annual budget: ₹3,113.50 crore (US$320 million) (2023–24 est.)
- Ministers responsible: Kinjarapu Ram Mohan Naidu, Union Cabinet Minister; Murlidhar Kisan Mohol, Minister of State
- Agency executive: Samir Kumar Sinha, IAS
- Website: www.civilaviation.gov.in

The Ministry of Civil Aviation (Naagar Vimaan Mantraalay) in India is the nodal ministry responsible for the formulation of national policies and programmes for the development and regulation of civil aviation. It devises and implements schemes for the orderly growth and expansion of civil air transport in the country. The mandate of this ministry also extend to overseeing airport facilities, air traffic services and carriage of passengers and goods by air. The ministry also administers the implementation of the Bharatiya Vayuyan Adhiniyam, 2024, Aircraft Rules, 1937 and is administratively responsible for the Commission of Railway Safety.

== Controversies ==
In 2015, two Air India flights were delayed to accommodate VIP travelers, including Minister of State Kiren Rijiju and an aide of Maharashtra Chief Minister Devendra Fadnavis, with passengers allegedly offloaded to make room. The Prime Minister's Office sought a report, and the Civil Aviation Minister publicly apologized.

According to Deccan Herald, in 2015 the ministry wrote to the DGCA, BCAS, Air India, AAI, and Pawan Hans seeking details of employees who had allegedly secured jobs for relatives in violation of service rules, warning that violators would face action.

== Organisation ==
The ministry has under its ownership the following central government establishments:

=== Statutory bodies ===
- Directorate General of Civil Aviation (DGCA)
- Aircraft Accident Investigation Bureau (AAIB)
- Bureau of Civil Aviation Security (BCAS)
- Airports Economic Regulatory Authority (AERA)
- Airports Authority of India (AAI)

=== Attached offices ===
- Commission of Railway Safety - The commission is the rail safety authority in India, as directed by the 1989 Railways Act. The agency investigates rail accidents.

=== Training institutions ===
- Indira Gandhi Rashtriya Uran Akademi (IGRUA)
- National Aviation University (NAU)

=== Central Public Sector Undertakings ===
1. Pawan Hans
2. AI Assets Holding Limited
3. Hotel Corporation of India Limited, a subsidiary of AI Assets Holding Ltd.
4. AI Engineering Services Limited Official Website

== Aircraft projects ==
- Civil Aviation Department RG-1 Rohini
- Civil Aviation Department MG-1
- Civil Aviation Department Mrigasheer
- Civil Aviation Department Revathi
- Hindustan Ardhra

== Cabinet ministers ==
No.	Portrait	Minister (Birth-Death) Constituency	Term of office			Political party	Ministry	Prime Minister
No.	Portrait	Minister (Birth-Death) Constituency	From	To	Period	Political party	Ministry	Prime Minister
Minister in the Department of Civil Aviation, Ministry of Communications
1		Hari Vinayak Pataskar (1892–1970); MP for Jalgaon (MoS)	7 December 1956	16 April 1957	130 days	Indian National Congress	Nehru II	Jawaharlal Nehru
Ministry disestablished during this interval (Note: The matters pertaining to the Department of Civil Aviation were placed under the Ministry of Transport and Communications from 1957 till 1963 and thereupon under the Ministry of Transport from 1963.)
Minister of Civil Aviation
2		Satya Narayan Sinha (1900–1983); MP for Samastipur	9 June 1964	13 June 1964	4 days	Indian National Congress	Shastri	Lal Bahadur Shastri
3		Nityanand Kanungo (1900–1988); MP for Cuttack (MoS)	13 June 1964	31 July 1965	1 year, 48 days	Indian National Congress	Shastri	Lal Bahadur Shastri
4		Raj Bahadur (1912–1990); MP for Bharatpur	31 July 1965	24 January 1966	177 days	Indian National Congress	Shastri	Lal Bahadur Shastri
4		Raj Bahadur (1912–1990); MP for Bharatpur	31 July 1965	24 January 1966	177 days	Indian National Congress	Nanda II	Gulzarilal Nanda
Ministry disestablished during this interval (Note: The Ministry of Civil Aviation was merged with the Ministry of Transport and Aviation.)
Minister of Tourism and Civil Aviation
5		Karan Singh (born 1931); MP for Udhampur	16 March 1967	9 November 1973	6 years, 2 days	Indian National Congress	Indira II	Indira Gandhi
5		Karan Singh (born 1931); MP for Udhampur	16 March 1967	9 November 1973	6 years, 2 days	Indian National Congress (R)	Indira III	Indira Gandhi
(4)		Raj Bahadur (1912–1990); MP for Bharatpur	9 November 1973	22 December 1976	3 years, 43 days	Indian National Congress (R)	Indira III	Indira Gandhi
6		Kotha Raghuramaiah (1912–1979); MP for Guntur	23 December 1976	24 March 1977	91 days	Indian National Congress (R)	Indira III	Indira Gandhi
7		Purushottam Kaushik (1930–2017); MP for Raipur	26 March 1977	15 July 1979	2 years, 111 days	Janata Party	Desai	Morarji Desai
–		Morarji Desai (1896–1995); MP for Surat (Prime Minister)	16 July 1979	28 July 1979	12 days	Janata Party	Desai	Morarji Desai
8		Mohammad Shafi Qureshi (1928–2016); MP for Anantnag	30 July 1979	14 January 1980	168 days	Janata Party (Secular)	Charan	Charan Singh
9		Janaki Ballabh Patnaik (1927–2015); MP for Cuttack	14 January 1980	7 June 1980	145 days	Indian National Congress (I)	Indira IV	Indira Gandhi
10		Anant Sharma (1919–1988); Rajya Sabha MP for Bihar	8 June 1980	2 September 1982	2 years, 86 days	Indian National Congress (I)	Indira IV	Indira Gandhi
Minister of Civil Aviation
11		Bhagwat Jha Azad (1922–2011); MP for Bhagalpur (MoS, I/C)	2 September 1982	14 February 1983	165 days	Indian National Congress (I)	Indira IV	Indira Gandhi
Minister of Tourism and Civil Aviation
12		Khurshed Alam Khan (1919–2013); MP for Farrukhabad (MoS, I/C)	14 February 1983	31 October 1984	1 year, 316 days	Indian National Congress (I)	Indira IV	Indira Gandhi
12		Khurshed Alam Khan (1919–2013); MP for Farrukhabad (MoS, I/C)	4 November 1984	31 December 1984	1 year, 316 days	Indian National Congress (I)	Rajiv I	Rajiv Gandhi
–		Rajiv Gandhi (1944–1991); MP for Amethi (Prime Minister)	31 December 1984	25 September 1985	268 days	Indian National Congress (I)	Rajiv II	Rajiv Gandhi
Ministry disestablished during this interval (Note: The Ministry of Civil Aviation was merged into the Ministry of Transport as the Department of Civil Aviation.)
Minister of Civil Aviation
13		Jagdish Tytler (born 1944); MP for Delhi Sadar (MoS, I/C)	22 October 1986	14 February 1988	1 year, 115 days	Indian National Congress (I)	Rajiv II	Rajiv Gandhi
14		Motilal Vora (1928–2020); Rajya Sabha MP for Madhya Pradesh	14 February 1988	25 June 1988	132 days	Indian National Congress (I)	Rajiv II	Rajiv Gandhi
Minister of Civil Aviation and Tourism
15		Shivraj Patil (born 1935); MP for Latur (MoS, I/C)	25 June 1988	2 December 1989	1 year, 160 days	Indian National Congress (I)	Rajiv II	Rajiv Gandhi
Minister of Civil Aviation
–		Vishwanath Pratap Singh (1931–2008); MP for Fatehpur (Prime Minister)	2 December 1989	5 December 1989	3 days	Janata Dal	Vishwanath	Vishwanath Pratap Singh
16		Arif Mohammad Khan (born 1951); MP for Bahraich	6 December 1989	10 November 1990	339 days	Janata Dal	Vishwanath	Vishwanath Pratap Singh
17		Harmohan Dhawan (1940–2024); MP for Chandigarh (MoS, I/C)	21 November 1990	21 June 1991	212 days	Samajwadi Janata Party (Rashtriya)	Chandra Shekhar	Chandra Shekhar
Minister of Civil Aviation and Tourism
18		Madhavrao Scindia (1945–2001); MP for Gwalior	21 June 1991	9 January 1993	1 year, 202 days	Indian National Congress (I)	Rao	P. V. Narasimha Rao
19		Ghulam Nabi Azad (born 1949); Rajya Sabha MP for Maharashtra	9 January 1993	16 May 1996	3 years, 128 days	Indian National Congress (I)	Rao	P. V. Narasimha Rao
20		V. Dhananjay Kumar (1951–2019); MP for Mangalore	16 May 1996	1 June 1996	16 days	Bharatiya Janata Party	Vajpayee I	Atal Bihari Vajpayee
21		C. M. Ibrahim (born 1948); Rajya Sabha MP for Karnataka	1 June 1996	29 June 1996	28 days	Janata Dal	Deve Gowda	H. D. Deve Gowda
Minister in the Department of Civil Aviation			29 June 1996	21 April 1997	296 days	Janata Dal	Deve Gowda	H. D. Deve Gowda
21A		C. M. Ibrahim (born 1948); Rajya Sabha MP for Karnataka	29 June 1996	21 April 1997	296 days	Janata Dal	Deve Gowda	H. D. Deve Gowda
Minister in the Department of Tourism			29 June 1996	21 April 1997	296 days	Janata Dal	Deve Gowda	H. D. Deve Gowda
21B		Srikant Kumar Jena (born 1950); MP for Kendrapara	29 June 1996	21 April 1997	296 days	Janata Dal	Deve Gowda	H. D. Deve Gowda
Minister in the Department of Civil Aviation			21 April 1997	19 March 1998	332 days	Janata Dal	Gujral	Inder Kumar Gujral
(21A)		C. M. Ibrahim (born 1948); Rajya Sabha MP for Karnataka	21 April 1997	19 March 1998	332 days	Janata Dal	Gujral	Inder Kumar Gujral
Minister in the Department of Tourism			21 April 1997	19 March 1998	332 days	Janata Dal	Gujral	Inder Kumar Gujral
(21B)		Srikant Kumar Jena (born 1950); MP for Kendrapara	21 April 1997	19 March 1998	332 days	Janata Dal	Gujral	Inder Kumar Gujral
Minister of Civil Aviation
22		Ananth Kumar (1959–2018); MP for Bangalore South	19 March 1998	13 October 1999	1 year, 208 days	Bharatiya Janata Party	Vajpayee II	Atal Bihari Vajpayee
23		Sharad Yadav (1947–2023); MP for Madhepura	13 October 1999	1 September 2001	1 year, 323 days	Samata Party	Vajpayee III	Atal Bihari Vajpayee
24		Syed Shahnawaz Hussain (born 1968); MP for Kishanganj	1 September 2001	24 May 2003	1 year, 265 days	Bharatiya Janata Party	Vajpayee III	Atal Bihari Vajpayee
25		Rajiv Pratap Rudy (born 1962); MP for Chapra (MoS, I/C)	24 May 2003	22 May 2004	364 days	Bharatiya Janata Party	Vajpayee III	Atal Bihari Vajpayee
26		Praful Patel (born 1957); Rajya Sabha MP for Maharashtra (MoS, I/C)	23 May 2004	22 May 2009	6 years, 235 days	Nationalist Congress Party	Manmohan I	Manmohan Singh
26		Praful Patel (born 1957); Rajya Sabha MP for Maharashtra (MoS, I/C)	28 May 2009	19 January 2011	6 years, 235 days	Nationalist Congress Party	Manmohan II	Manmohan Singh
27		Vayalar Ravi (born 1937); Rajya Sabha MP for Kerala	19 January 2011	18 December 2011	333 days	Indian National Congress	Manmohan II	Manmohan Singh
28		Ajit Singh (1939–2021); MP for Baghpat	18 December 2011	26 May 2014	2 years, 159 days	Rashtriya Lok Dal	Manmohan II	Manmohan Singh
29		Pusapati Ashok Gajapathi Raju (born 1951); MP for Vizianagaram	27 May 2014	9 March 2018	3 years, 286 days	Telugu Desam Party	Modi I	Narendra Modi
–		Narendra Modi (born 1950); MP for Varanasi (Prime Minister)	9 March 2018	10 March 2018	1 day	Bharatiya Janata Party	Modi I	Narendra Modi
30		Suresh Prabhu (born 1953); Rajya Sabha MP for Andhra Pradesh	10 March 2018	30 May 2019	1 year, 81 days	Bharatiya Janata Party	Modi I	Narendra Modi
31		Hardeep Singh Puri (born 1952); Rajya Sabha MP for Uttar Pradesh (MoS, I/C)	31 May 2019	7 July 2021	2 years, 37 days	Bharatiya Janata Party	Modi II	Narendra Modi
32		Jyotiraditya Scindia (born 1971); Rajya Sabha MP for Madhya Pradesh	7 July 2021	9 June 2024	2 years, 338 days	Bharatiya Janata Party	Modi II	Narendra Modi
33		Kinjarapu Ram Mohan Naidu (born 1987); MP for Srikakulam	10 June 2024	Incumbent	2 years, 107 days	Telugu Desam Party	Modi III	Narendra Modi

== Ministers of State ==
No.	Portrait	Minister (Birth-Death) Constituency	Term of office			Political party	Ministry	Prime Minister
No.	Portrait	Minister (Birth-Death) Constituency	From	To	Period	Political party	Ministry	Prime Minister
Minister of State for Tourism and Civil Aviation
1		Sarojini Mahishi (1927–2015); MP for Dharwad North	2 May 1971	10 October 1974	3 years, 161 days	Indian National Congress (R)	Indira III	Indira Gandhi
2		Surendra Pal Singh (1917–2009); MP for Bulandshahr	10 October 1974	23 December 1976	2 years, 74 days	Indian National Congress (R)	Indira III	Indira Gandhi
3		P. Ankineedu Prasada Rao (1929–1997); MP for Bapatla	4 August 1979	27 November 1979	115 days	Indian National Congress (U)	Charan	Charan Singh
4		Kartik Oraon (1924–1981); MP for Lohardaga	14 January 1980	8 June 1980	146 days	Indian National Congress (I)	Indira IV	Indira Gandhi
5		Chandulal Chandrakar (1920–1995); MP for Durg	8 June 1980	15 January 1982	1 year, 221 days	Indian National Congress (I)	Indira IV	Indira Gandhi
6		Khurshed Alam Khan (1919–2013); MP for Farrukhabad	15 January 1982	2 September 1982	230 days	Indian National Congress (I)	Indira IV	Indira Gandhi
Minister of State for Tourism and Civil Aviation
7		Ashok Gehlot (born 1951); MP for Jodhpur	31 December 1984	24 August 1985	236 days	Indian National Congress (I)	Rajiv II	Rajiv Gandhi
Minister of State for Civil Aviation and Tourism
8		M. O. H. Farook (1937–2012); MP for Pondicherry	21 June 1991	2 July 1992	1 year, 11 days	Indian National Congress (I)	Rao	P. V. Narasimha Rao
Minister of State in the Department of Civil Aviation						Indian National Congress (I)	Rao	P. V. Narasimha Rao
(8)		M. O. H. Farook (1937–2012); MP for Pondicherry	2 July 1992	17 January 1996	3 years, 199 days	Indian National Congress (I)	Rao	P. V. Narasimha Rao
9B		G. Y. Krishnan (1929–2001); Rajya Sabha MP for Karnataka	15 September 1995	16 May 1996	244 days	Indian National Congress (I)	Rao	P. V. Narasimha Rao
Minister of State in the Department of Tourism						Indian National Congress (I)	Rao	P. V. Narasimha Rao
9A		Sukhbans Kaur Bhinder (1943–2006); MP for Gurdaspur	2 July 1992	16 May 1996	3 years, 319 days	Indian National Congress (I)	Rao	P. V. Narasimha Rao
Minister of State for Civil Aviation
10		Jayanthi Natarajan (born 1954); Rajya Sabha MP for Tamil Nadu	9 June 1997	19 March 1998	283 days	Tamil Maanila Congress (Moopanar)	Gujral	Inder Kumar Gujral
11		Chaman Lal Gupta (1934–2021); MP for Udhampur	13 October 1999	1 September 2001	1 year, 323 days	Bharatiya Janata Party	Vajpayee III	Atal Bihari Vajpayee
12		Shripad Naik (born 1952); MP for Panaji	1 July 2002	24 May 2003	327 days	Bharatiya Janata Party	Vajpayee III	Atal Bihari Vajpayee
13		K. C. Venugopal (born 1963); MP for Alappuzha	28 October 2012	26 May 2014	1 year, 210 days	Indian National Congress	Manmohan II	Manmohan Singh
14		G. M. Siddeshwara (born 1952); MP for Davanagere	26 May 2014	9 November 2014	167 days	Bharatiya Janata Party	Modi I	Narendra Modi
15		Mahesh Sharma (born 1959); MP for Gautam Buddh Nagar	9 November 2014	5 July 2016	1 year, 239 days	Bharatiya Janata Party	Modi I	Narendra Modi
16		Jayant Sinha (born 1963); MP for Hazaribagh	5 July 2016	30 May 2019	2 years, 329 days	Bharatiya Janata Party	Modi I	Narendra Modi
17		General; V. K. Singh (Retd.); PVSM AVSM YSM ADC (born 1950); MP for Ghaziabad	7 July 2021	10 June 2024	5 years, 80 days	Bharatiya Janata Party	Modi II	Narendra Modi
18		Murlidhar Mohol (born 1974); MP for Pune	10 June 2024	Incumbent	2 years, 108 days	Bharatiya Janata Party	Modi III	Narendra Modi

== See also ==
- Aviation in India
- DigiYatra
