= The Tenth Riddle =

2021 book by Sapan Saxena

- Author: Sapan Saxena
- Language: English
- Subject: Indian History, Myth, Fiction, Devi
- Genre: Mystery
- Publisher: Locksley Hall
- Publication date: October 2021
- Publication place: India
- ISBN: 978-8-195405-51-0

The Tenth Riddle is the third book by Sapan Saxena. It was released in October 2021 and is published by Locksley Hall. The novel follows murder of erstwhile princess of Goner, Rajasthan and how her murder is linked to a deep rooted secret in the history of Indian sub-continent. The novel deals with mythological themes, specifically centered around the prime Hindu goddess Adi Parashakti or Mahadevi and her ten forms of Mahavidya.

The novel was launched in Lucknow by Kaushal Kishore, Minister of State for Housing and Urban Affairs, Government of India. The launch was also attended by Shaista Ambar, President of All India Muslim Women's Personal Law Board

In his interview with News Now, Sapan Saxena shared that "he has tried to explore the concept of sacred feminism with the context of a murder mystery"

== Plot ==
The book opens six years back from the current day with the murder of erstwhile princess of Goner, Avni Saraswat. In the present day, the lawyer of the royal family reaches out to the National Commission for Women which further approach the offices of Intelligence Bureau(India), New Delhi. Deputy Director Shoumik Haldar along with bestselling author Ishan Vajpayee and Shakti Sinha, Member of the Legislative Assembly of Jaipur form a team to crack the case. They travel to Goner and realize the case is much darker and murkier than what they originally anticipated. They come across ten riddles, each based on the ten forms of Mahadevi, called the Mahavidya and solve them one by one.

== Marketing ==
Because of the COVID-19 induced travel restrictions, marketing of The Tenth Riddle was majorly done in online sphere. Sapan usually has a trend of revealing the title first, then the cover, then the trailer and finally, launch the book. This trend continued with The Tenth Riddle as well. The marketing campaign kickstarted with Press release of the book which was hosted at Cappuccino Blast, Lucknow.

== Reception ==
The Tenth Riddle received mostly positive reviews from critics across major national dailies of India. Within two months of its release, Delhi Wire put The Tenth Riddle in their list of "Top 10 Books You Shouldn’t Miss Reading This November."

The Pioneer considered it an interesting concoction of history, mythology, ancient secrets and, a tinge of feminism.

In the third month of its release, News Now put The Tenth Riddle in its list of "BOOKS YOU DEFINITELY SHOULDN’T MISS THIS WINTER".

On December 16, 2021, The Asian Chronicle featured Sapan Saxena along with The Tenth Riddle as Sapan claimed "I want to always gift my readers something new and unique to read. A lot of effort goes into the same and it clearly shows in the reviews.".

On November 16, 2021, The Tenth Riddle was trending on top 3 spots of Twitter trends on a national level.` Samata Dey of IndiaCafe24 calls the book "a well-drafted and well-crafted book that is worth a read if you love a thriller with a touch of mythology." Aditi Debnath on the Medium writes "The story had a perfect blend of mythology and thriller. With simple writing, the author roots out with varied ill ancient practices which took place in our country"
