= Fursatganj Airfield =

Airport in Amethi

Fursatganj Airport Amethi Airport
- IATA: none; ICAO: VERB

Summary
- Airport type: Public
- Owner: Ministry of Civil Aviation, Government of India
- Operator: Airports Authority of India
- Serves: Raebareli & Amethi
- Location: Fursatganj, Amethi district, Uttar Pradesh, India
- Elevation AMSL: 359 ft / 109 m
- Coordinates: 26.2516646°N 81.3863976°E

Map

Runways
Direction	Length		Surface
Direction	ft	m	Surface
09/27	6,118	1,864.77	Asphalt

Fursatganj Airport or Fursatganj Airfield is an under-construction domestic airport under UDAN scheme and functional airfield at Fursatganj of Amethi district in the Indian state of Uttar Pradesh.

Indira Gandhi Rashtriya Uran Akademi is a flight training school established in 1986 and co-located with the airfield under the government of India.

== Airlines and destinations ==
The airport/airstrip has only unscheduled chartered flights as of now. But as per sources, direct flight will be scheduled for Delhi-NCR.

== See also ==
- Chaudhary Charan Singh Airport
- Lal Bahadur Shastri Airport
- Noida International Airport
- Kanpur Airport
- Allahabad Airport
- Ayodhya Airport
- Sultanpur Airport
