= Civil Aviation Department Revathi =

Revathi

General information
- Type: Civil utility aircraft
- Manufacturer: Civil Aviation Department of India

History
- First flight: 13 January 1967

The Civil Aviation Department Revathi was a light utility aircraft designed in India principally for use by that country's flying clubs.

== Description ==
The Revathi was a conventional, low-wing monoplane with fixed tailwheel undercarriage and two seats side-by-side with an optional third seat behind them. The fuselage construction was of welded steel tube, with the forward section skinned in aluminium and the tail section in fabric. The wings were of all-metal construction and originally fitted with wooden flaps and ailerons that were later replaced with metal surfaces. The tail surfaces were also originally wooden but later replaced with metal.

== Development ==
The Revathi first flew on 13 January 1967 and received Indian type certification in January 1969.

The prototype's wings and fuel system were later revised, and the resulting configuration was designated the Revathi Mk.II. It first flew in this configuration on 20 May 1970. It received its Indian type certificate on 31 October 1972.

== Specifications (Mk.II) ==
Data from Jane's All the World's Aircraft, 1975-76

General characteristics

- Crew: 2
- Capacity: 1
- Length: 7.58 m (24 ft 10 in)
- Wingspan: 9.4 m (30 ft 10 in)
- Height: 2.97 m (9 ft 9 in) tail up
- Wing area: 14.09 m^{2} (151.7 sq ft)
- Aspect ratio: 6.27
- Airfoil: root:NACA 23015: tip:NACA 4412
- Empty weight: 616 kg (1,358 lb)
- Max takeoff weight: 962 kg (2,121 lb)
- Fuel capacity: 148 L (39 US gal; 33 imp gal) in two wing mounted integral tanks plus a 50 L (13 US gal; 11 imp gal) auxiliary tank in the fuselage behind the cabin
- Powerplant: 1 × Rolls-Royce/Continental O-300C 6-cyl. horizontally-opposed air-cooled piston engine, 108 kW (145 hp)
- Propellers: 2-bladed Sensenich M74DC54 fixed pitch metal propeller, 1.88 m (6 ft 2 in) diameter

Performance

- Maximum speed: 193 km/h (120 mph, 104 kn)
- Cruise speed: 169 km/h (105 mph, 91 kn)
- Stall speed: 95 km/h (59 mph, 51 kn)
- Never exceed speed: 260 km/h (160 mph, 140 kn)
- Range: 643 km (400 mi, 347 nmi)
- Ferry range: 804 km (500 mi, 434 nmi)
- Service ceiling: 3,505 m (11,499 ft)
- Rate of climb: 3 m/s (590 ft/min)
- Wing loading: 68.2 kg/m^{2} (14.0 lb/sq ft)
- Power/mass: 0.112 kW/kg (0.068 hp/lb)
