= History of Regional Engineering Colleges =

In Indian education

During the second five-year plan (1956–60) in India, a number of industrial projects were contemplated. To ensure enough supply of trained personnel to meet the demand for these projects, a decision was taken to start the Regional Engineering Colleges (RECs), at the rate of one per each major state, which can churn out graduates with good engineering merit. Thus, seventeen RECs were established from 1959 onwards in each of the major states. Each college was a joint and cooperative enterprise of the central government and the concerned state government. Today, all these institutes now offer degree courses at various bachelors, masters and doctorate levels in various branches of engineering and technology. The entire non-recurring expenditure and expenditure for post-graduate courses during the REC times were borne by the central government. As regards in the REC system the entire recurring expenditure on undergraduate courses, the same was shared by the central government and the state government on 50:50 basis. However, after becoming National Institutes of Technology (NITs) the entire funding is managed by the center now. REC system served well but as time passed some state governments showed lack of responsibility to take them in right direction. Following the long-standing demand for more Indian Institutes of Technology (IITs) the then Minister of Human Resource Development Murli Manohar Joshi decided to upgrade the RECs to NITs. In 2003, all RECs were upgraded to NITs and central government took control to run these Institutes.

== Objective behind the birth ==
A large number of industrial projects were contemplated for the 2nd Five-Year Plan period (1956–61). In order to ensure the supply of trained personnel to man these projects, the Planning Commission, in September 1955 appointed an Engineering Personnel Committee (EPC), to undertake an overall assessment of the demand and supply position in respect of engineering personnel-graduates and diploma-holders-during the 2nd Plan period and to recommend the extent to which facilities for technical education should be expanded. The EPC has estimated that by 1960–61, there would be a large gap in the supply position and the shortage will be of the order of 1,800 engineering graduates and 8,000 diploma-holders. For fulfilling the recommendations of the EPC, a scheme was formulated for :

- Expansion of the then existing 17, engineering colleges and 50 polytechnics and
- The establishment of 3 new engineering colleges and 23 polytechnics.

The Government of India decided to implement the first part of the EPC recommendations in 1957. As regards the establishment of the new institutions, it was decided that the matter should be re- examined in the light of the following considerations :

- New institutions, both for degree and diploma courses should be spread more evenly to ensure progressively equal opportunities for training all over the country.
- In planning the capacity for training courses both in the existing and the new institutions, the requirements of future five-year plans should also be kept in view.

The Central Government also decided that the new institutions to be established, after a review of the whole matter, should start at least with 5 with effect from the academic year 1958.

In order to decide the number of engineering colleges that should be started on the initiative of the Central Government, a statistical and integrated approach on the basis of the nature and scope of the future 5-year plans was called for. However, at that stage these details were not available. Nevertheless, expansion of technical education facilities to the extent possible, could not be delayed since institutions had to be established and courses organized well in advance of the initiation of the development projects. The problem was one of keeping a distant situation in mind and plan for technical education in stages.

With this end in view, it was decided that during the 2nd Plan period, facilities for first degree courses may be extended to about 11,000 seats from the then estimated figure of 9,000 places that would be available by the end of the 2nd Plan period. The extra 2,000 places were sought to be created in establishing 8 new engineering colleges, each with an annual admission of 250 students.

== Aims and Objectives ==
The foregoing historical narrative shows that the original aim of the decision to establish RECs. was to create institutional facilities for providing under-graduate education and training in different branches of engineering, with a view to supply the engineering manpower for the industrial projects and development envisaged under the successive Five-Year Plans. The common objectives were:

- To impart instruction in different branches of engineering
- To maintain high standard in education and training and
- To promote co-operation with industry and other technical institutions.

Considering the background, intentions and later developments, the aims and objectives of the RECs, can be stated as follows:

- To offer courses of instruction in different branches of engineering, mainly at the under-graduate level, to start with, in the overall perspective of general education with a view to develop an integrated personality.
- To make the instruction and training oriented towards creating in the students an awareness of and meeting the technological and socio-economic needs of the country.
- To promote research effort among various faculties, preferably on inter-disciplinary projects and undertake post- graduate instruction and training, keeping in view the needs of technology.
- To promote co-operation with industry and other sectors of economy logical growth and taking special note of the requirements of Regional Development.
- To maintain an all India character in regard to student admissions and requirement of faculty of high quality.
- To act as an important link in the interaction between the Central and State sectors of technical education.

== The Regional Engineering Colleges ==
These are large-sized institutions judged by the standards then prevailing in the country. The considerations that weighed in this decision were :

- A large-sized college would be more efficient than the equivalent small colleges,
- The proposed colleges have to meet the additional requirements of the country as a whole and for that purpose should have to function on an all-India basis. Therefore, the smaller they are in number and the larger in size, the better, and
- For the same reason as in (2) their location is important from an all-India point of view.

It was decided that the 9 new colleges should be established so that there were on an average 2 in each region, as follows:

Region	Places where RECs were planned
Eastern Region	Durgapur and Jamshedpur
Western Region	Nagpur, Surat, and Bhopal
Southern Region	Warangal and Mangalore
Northern Region	Delhi and Allahabad

Later, however, the college proposed for Hyderabad was established in Warangal. It was initially the intention that a college is to be established in Delhi in order to take over the degree courses in engineering and technology at the Delhi College of Engineering (DCE) now known as Delhi Technological University (DTU) and that the college should be developed only for degree courses both on full- time and part-time basis. However, the college at Delhi became a separate entity by itself and in its place the Regional Engineering College at Srinagar, J&K in the Northern Region was established. Thus, the 9 Regional Engineering Colleges in the first phase, came to be established.

== Central Engineering Colleges ==
Thus, 15 Regional Engineering Colleges were established one in each of the major States. The dates and places in the various States where they were established are as follows:-

Sl No.	Places where RECs were established	State	Year established
1	Warangal	Andhra Pradesh (now Telangana)	1959
2	Surathkal (Mangalore)	Mysore (now Karnataka)	1960
3	Nagpur	Maharashtra	1960
4	Bhopal	Madhya Pradesh	1960
5	Jamshedpur	Bihar (now Jharkhand)	1960
6	Srinagar	Jammu and Kashmir	1960
7	Durgapur	West Bengal	1960
8	Allahabad	Uttar Pradesh	1961
9	Rourkela	Orissa (now Odisha)	1961
10	Calicut	Kerala	1961
11	Surat	Gujarat	1962
12	Jaipur	Rajasthan	1963
13	Kurukshetra	Punjab (now Haryana)	1963
14	Tiruchirappalli	Madras (now Tamil Nadu)	1964
15	Silchar	Assam	1967

The colleges were intended to have all-India character and to serve the whole country for providing technical personnel required for the successive five-year plans. In view of the following aims and objectives, it was recommended that the Regional Engineering Colleges should appropriately be renamed as Central Engineering Colleges. The all-India character was to be ensured, by each college admitting students from all the other States and appointing the best available teaching staff, on an all-India basis.

Two more were later established in the states of Punjab and Himachal Pradesh at Jalandhar and Hamirpur 5 respectively owing to country's growing need for quality manpower.

Sl No.	Places where RECs were established	State	Year established
1	Hamirpur	Himachal Pradesh	1986
2	Jalandhar	Punjab	1987

== Recent developments ==
Ministry of Human Resource Development issued NIT status to three more colleges which are located at

Sl No.	Name of the engineering colleges	Places where colleges were established	State	Year established	Year converted to NIT
1	Bihar College of Engineering	Patna	Bihar	1886	2002
2	Government College of Mining & Metallurgy	Raipur	Chhattisgarh	1956	2005
3	Tripura Engineering College	Agartala	Tripura	1965	2006

These were done to provide an NIT to every new state carved out of its parent state whose NIT was lost as a result of the bifurcation. The 11th 5-year Plan envisages establishing 10 more NITs, bringing the current total of NITs to 30. Thus more than one NIT per state will become a reality. Based on the request of respective state government and feasibility, future NITs shall be either converted from the existing government institutes or can be set up as brand-new (Greenfield) NIT.
