= Mahasweta Chakraborty =

Indian pilot

- Born: 1998 (age 27–28); India
- Education: Indira Gandhi Rashtriya Uran Akademi

Mahasweta Chakraborty is an Indian aircraft pilot from New Town, Kolkata. During the COVID-19 pandemic in India, she assisted in the Vande Bharat Mission that transported oxygen concentrators from China and Hong Kong to several Indian cities. During the Russian invasion of Ukraine in 2022, she helped evacuate around 800 Indian students from the borders of Poland and Hungary as part of Operation Ganga.

== Early life and education ==
Mahasweta Chakraborty was born in 1998, the only child of Tanuja Chakraborty, president of West Bengal's women's wing of the Bharatiya Janata Party. Having listened to stories of her parents growing up in Ashoknagar in North 24 Parganas, where there are World War II hangars, she aspired to becoming a pilot. She attended Auxilium Convent School and later graduated from the Indira Gandhi Rashtriya Uran Akademi to become an aircraft pilot.

== Career ==
Chakraborty made her first flight at the age of 17. During the COVID-19 pandemic in India, she assisted in the Vande Bharat Mission that transported oxygen concentrators and other medical equipment from China and Hong Kong to several cities in India.

By 2022, she had been flying with a private airline company for four years. That year, during the Russian invasion of Ukraine, she helped evacuate around 800 Indian students from the borders of Poland and Hungary as part of Operation Ganga. (Note: Over 20,000 Indian students were evacuated in the first few weeks of the invasion.) The evacuation was accomplished in six sorties between 27 February and 7 March. It was operated from Istanbul, from where she flew the Airbus A320. She told The Telegraph that "Operation Ganga has shown me the things that really matter in life. When you see people who've made it through after walking for miles in sub-zero temperatures without food, shelter or support, you realise how trivial most of our everyday problems are." On returning to Kolkata, her story was widely told on social media in India, and she received favourable comments from police officials, politicians, journalists, and the cricketer Sourav Ganguly. Her response was that she was no exception and that "several other pilots are doing the same job and theirs is no less of an achievement. Then there are the other staff members who make a mission possible, everyone from the cabin crew to the loaders. Without a proper team, none of this can happen."

== Other work and personal ==
Chakraborty has worked with non-governmental agencies linked to women's rights and assisting abandoned children. Her interests as noted in an interview include Rabindra Sangeet, pottery, and Marvel.

== Honours and awards ==
In 2022, the Rotary Club of Calcutta Metro City awarded Chakraborty the Swayam Siddha award, for her actions being a role model for empowering women.
