= Shantanu (disambiguation) =

Shantanu is a character in the ancient Indian epic Mahabharata.

Shantanu may also refer to:

- Shantanu Maheshwari, Indian dancer and actor
- Shantanu Moitra, Indian composer
- Shantanu Mukherjee, Indian singer and actor
- Shantanu Narayen, Indian-American business executive

== See also ==
- Santanu (disambiguation)
