= Daily Post India =

Indian daily newspaper published in English

- Type: Daily online
- Format: Broadsheet
- Founded: 15 July 2011
- Political alignment: Neutral
- Language: Punjabi language
- Headquarters: Chandigarh, India
- Website: dailypost.in

Daily Post India is a Punjabi and Hindi-language broadsheet daily newspaper published from Chandigarh, India. The first edition of the newspaper appeared on 15 July 2011. The Daily Post has a special edition as well, it publishes special edition for Chandigarh and region. The Daily Post is also available in e-paper format. Daily Post newspaper is a part of Vigilant Media Pvt. Ltd.
