= Culrav =

Annual cultural festival in India

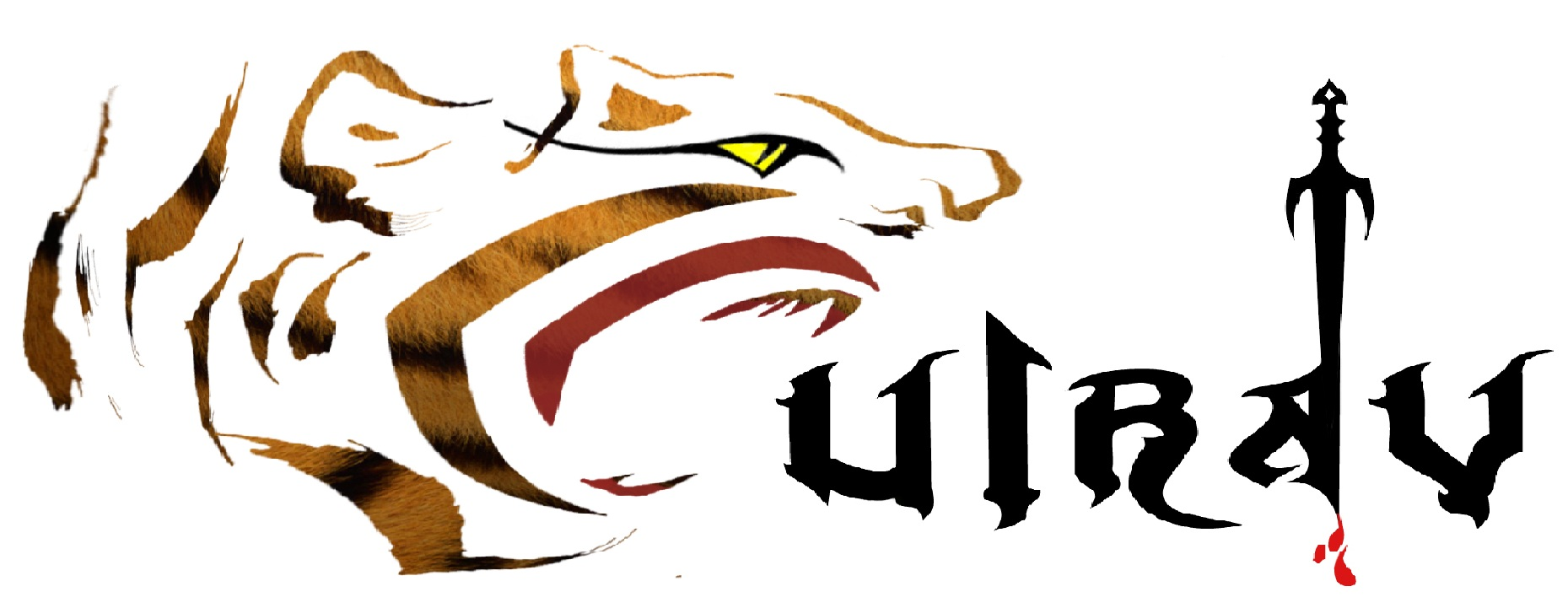
- Culrav'12 Logo
- Genre: Cultural
- Locations: Prayagraj, Uttar Pradesh, India
- Founded: 1986 by Hemendu Sinha(1989 batch)
- Attendance: 20–25K footfall, 100 Colleges (approx.)
- Patron: Motilal Nehru National Institute of Technology, Allahabad
- Website: culrav.mnnit.ac.in

Culrav is the annual cultural festival of Motilal Nehru National Institute of Technology, Prayagraj.

Initiated in 1986, Culrav is a college-based festival in Northern India. It includes competitions, pro-nites and informal events by which Culrav attracts visitors from colleges all over the country. The festival draws students from colleges such as IIT Kanpur, IIT Roorkee, IIT-BHU, NIT Bhopal, University of Allahabad, BHU, IIIT-A, HBTI, IET Lucknow.

Previous performers in Culrav include Farhan Akhtar, Suraj Jagan, Shruti Pathak, Shirley Setia, Euphoria, Ahsaan Qureshi, Zaeden, DJ MARNIK, Mohit Chauhan, Monali Thakur, Naalayak and Kabir Cafe. Previous guest speakers include Munawwar Rana, Ashok Chakradhar, Ronnie Screwvala and Piyush Mishra. The 2019 Culrav took place from 3 to 6 April. It had numerous event categories from dramatics, dance, arts, music, fashion, literary, photography and film-making. In addition to the major events there were numerous informals and stalls which provide entertainment in between the breaks as well. The first night's flagship event was "Kavyasandhya" where prolific poets from across the country perform. A band performance was also organised for the event "Rocktave".

Culrav is generally held over a duration of 4 days. Every year a theme is chosen and for Culrav 2019 it was "Amusement" with the caption "Rendezvous with Euphoria" .

== Events ==
=== Anunaad ===
Anunaad is the musical event which was held across the 4 days of Culrav. In Culrav 2019 it had the following events: Voice of Culrav, G.O.A.T, Rocktave, Harmony, Euphony.

Spunk band performed as the main event in Rocktave.

=== Rangmanch ===
Rangmanch is conducted under the purview of Alchemy- the Official Dramatic Club of MNNIT. It consists of the following events:

1. Hasyamanch: Earlier known as 'Nautanki', it is a comedic piece which often uses satire, histrionics and bucolic settings to achieve comey set up on a social message.
2. Nukkad: The street play where social taboo topics like marital rape, LGBT, sex education to widely resounding truths such as corruption, drug addiction, women empowerment, in order to send out a social commentary performed outdoor. Street play is considered to be the rawest form of acting, because one does not have access to speakers or microphones.
3. Natyamanch: The stage play is performed inside the Multipurpose Hall, and is known for exhibiting the theatrical prowess of the students and draws in large crowds.
4. Pratibimb: Also known as mono-act competition where a single actor is required to captivate the audience in a given duration solely by using props on stage and acting skill.

Stand-up comedy was added in Culrav 2019 seeing the increased craze for stand-up comedy.

=== Litmuse ===
It's a literary event held under the umbrage of Literary Club of MNNIT, with myriad of events such as Kavyanjali, Vaktavya, Hasya Kosh, Talk till you drop, Motley, Lacuzzi, Poetry Slam and 'Sansadiya vaad vivad pratigya'. It is for both English and Hindi-speakers.

=== Darkroom ===
This is the Photography and Filmography section of Culrav. It has under it aegis multitude of events ranging from "Once upon a time" to 50-hours film making. It is supervised by the Media House of MNNIT.

=== Razzmatazz ===
Razzmatazz is the dancing event where solo as well as team dancing skills are displayed. In Culrav 2k19, Shubham Sharma a participant of India's Got Talent came to judge. The sub events are as follows:

1. Step Up: This is the duo dancing competition.
2. Shimmy Shake: The solo styled event.
3. Desi Sync: The multicultural theme pervades this event from Marathi, Rajasthani, Garba to South Indian folk, we can witness a culmination of Indian styles on stage.
4. Feet on Fire: A western-themed event, whose content ranges from gravity defying moves to rhythmic sequences and from hip-hop to contemporary.

=== Spandan ===
The fashion event of Culrav has attracted large crowds. It involves a team event and a Mr. & Mrs Spandan event, wherein individual participants go through a selection process similar to beauty pageants.

=== Rangsaazi ===
The art fest has attracted many students for its themes and settings. The Arts Club is designated to choose a theme for the entire Culrav Event.
