= Santanu Kumar Acharya =

Odia writer (born 1933)

- ଶାନ୍ତନୁ କୁମାର ଆଚାର୍ଯ୍ୟ
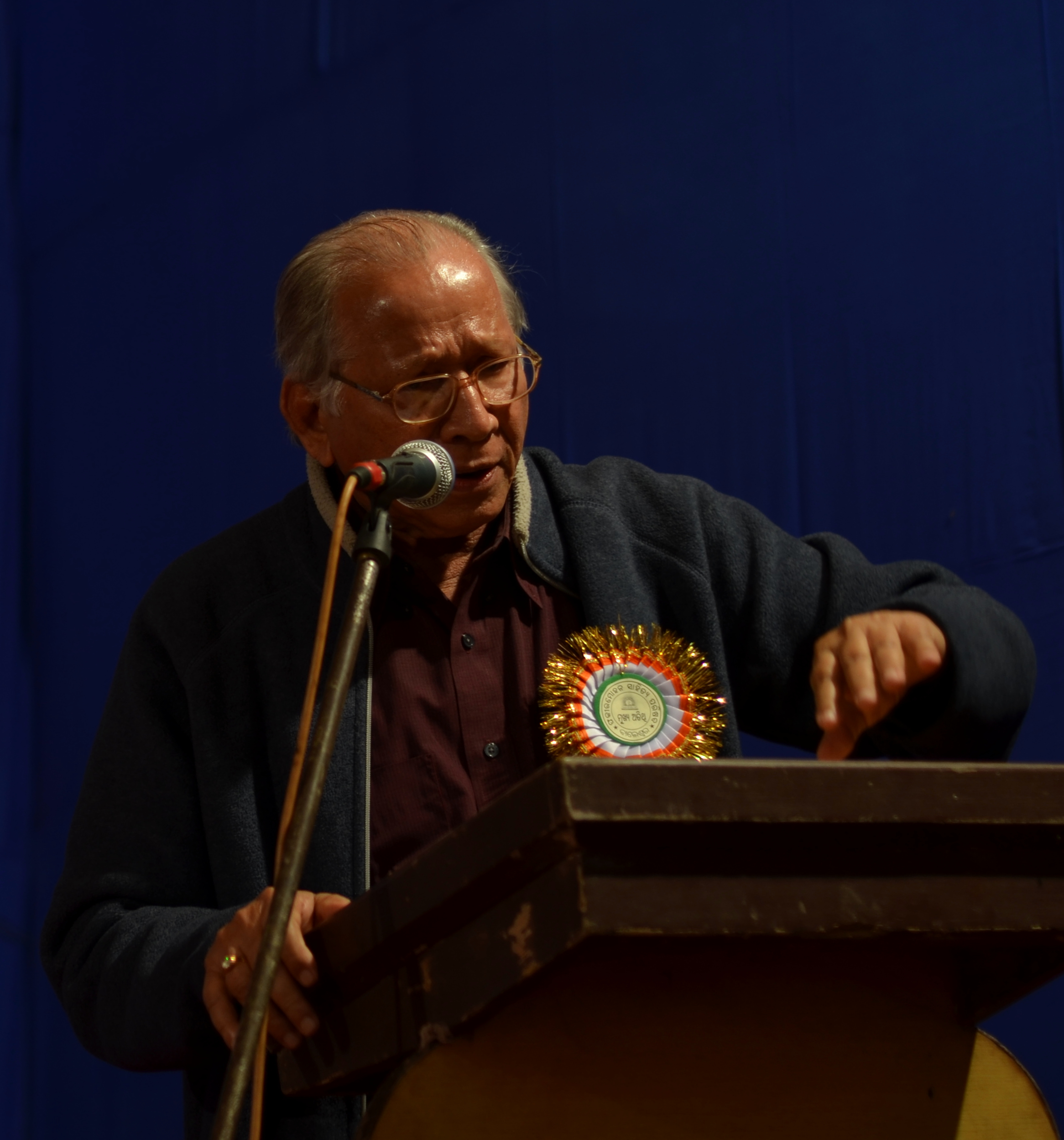
- Acharya during Fakir Mohan's 172nd birthday celebration at Santikanana, Balasore, Odisha
- Born: 15 May 1933 (age 93); Kolkata, West Bengal, India
- Education: Ravenshaw College
- Occupation: Professor
- Spouse: Nirupama Acharya
- Children: Three
- Relatives: Gopal Chandra Praharaj (grandfather)
- Writing career
- Language: Odia
- Genres: Litterateur, fiction writer
- Subjects: Novels, short stories, essays and children's literature
- Notable work: Nara Kinnara; Shatabdira Nachiketa; Dakshinabarta; Shakuntala
- Notable awards: Sahitya Akademi

Santanu Kumar Acharya (born 15 May 1933) is a Sahitya Akademi Award-winning Indian writer.

== Life ==
Santanu Kumar Acharya was born on 15 May 1933 in Kolkata, West Bengal, to his mother Krushnapriya Mishra (1910–1942) and father Ananta Charan Acharya (1900–1985). His home at that time was in the village of Sidheswarpur, Odisha, where his grandfather who compiled the Purnachandra Odia Bhashakosha, Gopala Chandra Praharaj, also lived. On 13 June 1942, his mother, Krushnapriya, died. Shortly after her death, the Quit India Movement began in August. Santanu Kumar Acharya's father was a Gandhian, and his family was ostracized by the village elders of Sidheswarpur who were supporters of the British. This event combined with his mother's death just a few months ago led Acharya to find comfort in nature. He began to write poetry about the aesthetics of nature. Soon after that, his poetry started to focus more on introspection rather than aesthetics. In 1944, at the age of 11, he began to write serious poetry which gained him some recognition at his school. The poetry he wrote then was collected and published as Mandakini in 2022. He served the Government of Odisha as a college teacher for 34 years, from 1958 to 1992. He retired as the Registrar of Utkal University.

== Selected works ==
Acharya has written 17 novels, 23 short story collections comprising about 400 stories, and 11 children's books.

=== Novels ===
- Nara-Kinnara, (Man and the Subhuman) (1962) OCLC 19709402
- Shatabdira Nachiketa, (The Nachiketas of the Century) (1965) OCLC 31273921
- Tinoti Ratira Sakala, (The Mornings of Three Nights) (1969) OCLC 30883637
- Dakshinabartta, (A Journey to the South) (1973) OCLC 85111020
- Yatrara Prathama Pada, (The First Leg of the Journey) (1976) OCLC 18599049
- Anya Eka Samaya Anya Eka Bharata, (It's Another Time and It's Another India) (1977) OCLC 20586266
- Shakuntala, (A Novel on the Analysis of Violence and Naxalite Movement in India) (1980) OL 25428510M
- Mantrinka Share, (The Minister's Share) (1988) OCLC 21599056
- Dharitrira Kanda, (The Weeping Earth) (1994) OL 25948608M
- Anu Hajijiba Pare, (After Anu Got Lost) (1995) OCLC 35263089 ISBN 9788174111524
- Adrushya Jagataru Barta, (Messages from the Unknown World) (1996)
- Billy Goat Banam Uruvela Ghotatak, (Mr. Billy Goat Alias Mr. Laughing Horse of the Uruvela Forest) (1997)
- Swarna Tribhuja, (Golden Triangle) (1998) OCLC 46617869 This is a collection of the three short novels of Mantrinka Share, Adrushya Jagataru Barta, & Billy Goat Banam Uruvela Ghotatak.
- Trishna: Eka Anaviskrita America, (A Travel-Diary of the Writer Compounded with a Novel Named After the Chief Protagonist Trishna, Based on America) (1999) OCLC 46617827
- Anomara Kanya, (Anoma’s Daughter: a Historical Novel Based on Redetermination of Goutama Buddha’s Birth Place, in Odisha) (2002) OL 25432658M
- Jeje Malapare, (After Jeje Died) (2020), Science Fiction, Novel, Publ: Grantha Mandira, Binode Bihari, Cuttack-2, Odisha.
- Bahu Bahu Janma, (2022), Novel, Publ: Grantha Mandira, Binode Bihari, Cuttack-2, Odisha.

=== Short story collections ===
- Mana Murmur, 1962 (The Murmuring Mind)
- Durbaara, 1965 (The Incorrigible)
- Eii Shesha Padati, 1972 (This last utterance)
- Aranyara Chula, 1974 (The Tip of The Forest)
- Adina Boula, 1978 (Mango blossoms out of season)
- Ekabinsha Satabdi Paain Galpa, 1978 (Stories for the Twenty First Century)
- Karanjia Diary, 1984 (Based on the real life adventures and observations of the author in Karanjia, Mayurbhanj District
- Aadya Sakaala, 1985 (The first dawn)
- Sarpa Jaana, 1989 (The Snake Vehicle)
- Chalanti Thaakura, 1991 (God who Responds)
- Nataliyara Omkar, 1995 (The OM utterance of Nataliya)
- Galpa Varnali, 1997 (The Spectrum of Stories)
- Shreshtha Galpa, 1998 (A collection of the Best Short Stories)
- Jala Chhabira Raati, 1999 (A Night of Water Colors)
- Drushya-Adrushya, 2002 (The visible and the invisible)
- Chhaya Purusha, 2005 (The Person in the Shadow)
- Record Breaker, 2006
- Trutiya Netra, 2007 (The Third Eye)
- Santanu Acharya's Galpa Samagra (Collection of short stories of the author)
  - Vol 1, 2009
  - Vol 2, 2011
- Kala Pardara Aarapate, 2013 (Behind the Black Veil)
- Santanu Acharya-nka Smaraniya Galpa, 2015 (Twenty Memorable Short Stories of the author)
- AshtaSiDdhi O Anyanya Galpa,2019, Published by PrachiSahitya Pratishan, Binode Bihari, Cuttack-2

Anthology of Author's Recently written Stories of felt life experiences comprising dreams and  Occult Experiences.

- Katha Dashaka (Ten Selected Stories of the Author Santanu Kumar Acharya), First Ed 2021- Ed: Pitabas Routray, Publisher: Fhula Bhagaban Foundation, Mahabir Prakashan, Old Bus Stand, Bhubaneswar, ISBN 81-87989-32-17

=== Children's literature ===
- Mo Katha Ghoda Katha Kahe, 1961 (My Wooden Horse Speaks)
- Baga Bagichara Saudagara, 1962 (The Merchants of our gardens)
- Akashaku Satoti Pahacha, 1963 (Seven Steps to the Heavens: A science fiction on Space Flight)
- Koshi Upatyakara Rajkumar Mohan, 1964 (Mohan, the Prince of the Koshi Valley)
- Shaktira Karamati, 1971 (A book of Science on Machines and Power for Children)
- Mo Naan Da Vinci O Niaan Laga Opi, 1980 (My name is Da Vinchi and Opi the incendiary i.e. Oppenheimer the creator of the first atom bomb; Biographies)
- Nitidinia Jeebanare Bijnana, 1989 (Science in Everyday Life for Children)
- Baigyanika Abiskara o Udbhabana, 1989 (Important Scientific Discoveries and Life of Scientists)
- Dine Akasha bi na thila, 2001 (Once upon a Time there were no Skies over our heads; Cosmology for Children)
- Peeta Prastara Udyana, 2010 (A travelogue on the Yellow Stone National Park, US)
- Kathare Kathare Bigyana,2020, All the books on Children's Literature authored by Santanu Kumar Acharya Collected into one Book, Published by Santosh Publications, Kanchan, Gajapati Nagar, Sutahata, Cuttack, 753003.

=== Others ===
- Autobiography:

Mo Jeeban: Anya Eka Upanyasa, 2013 (My Life is Another Novel)

- Travelogue:

Baichitryamaya Desha: America Bhramana, 2015 (The Mysterious Country: America - A travelogue)

Books translated into other languages:

- English:
  - Shakuntala: award-winning original novel in Odia language, 1980, translated to English by Lipipushpa Nayak, first edition 2014
  - Anoma's Daughter: award-winning original novel in Odia, Anomara Kanya (2003), translated to English by Bibhas Mohanty and the author
  - Santanu Kumar Acharya: collection of short stories, published by Grass Roots, Kolkata, 2004, translated by St-Pierre, Leelawati Mohapatra and K.K. Mohapatra
- Hindi:
  - Nara Kinnara: first published in Odia language in Odisha, 1962, Odisha Sahitya Academy Award-winning classic Odia novel), translated from Odia to Hindi by Shanakar Lal Purohit, published by Vijaya Books, Sahadara Delhi, 2017, ISBN 9788192084107
  - Shakuntala (1987 Sarala Prize-winning Odia novel, first published in Odisha, 1980), published by Radhakrishna Prakashan (Rajkamal) Pvt Ltd (1997), Dariya Ganj, Delhi-2, translated from author's original novel Shakuntala in Odia to Hindi by Prof Radhakanta Mishra.
  - Dakshinavarta, 2002 (novel), translated from author's novel Dakshinavarta in Odia to Hindi by Dr Srinivas Udgata
  - Gujarati:
  - Dakshinavarta (novel), published by 1986, translated from author's original Odia novel Dakshinavarta to Gujarati and published by Dr Ranuka Sriram
- Bengali:
  - Chalanti Thakura (Academy Award-winning book: short story collection of the author), published 1991, translated from author's original short story collection to Bengali by Shyamasundar Mahapatra and Amitrasudan Bhattacharya, published by Sahitya Akademi, New Delhi, 2016

== Awards ==
Acharya speaking during Fakir Mohan Senapati's 172nd Jayanti at Shantikanana, Balasore

- National Award for Children's Literature from the Ministry of Education, Government of India (1961 and 1963)
  - 1961: for Mo katha ghoda katha kahe (My Wooden Horse Speaks; Science Fiction for Children)
  - 1963, for Akashaku satoti pahacha (Seven Steps to Heavens; Science Fiction for Children on Space Travel)
- Odisha Sahitya Akademi Award, 1962 (for his novel Nara Kinnara)
- Sarala Puraskara, 1987; A prestigious literary award offered annually by Odisha's famous industrial house IMFA, for his novel Shakuntala
- Sahitya Akademi Award, 1993 (Indian National Academy of Literature) for his short story book Chalanti Thakura (The Living God)
- Bharatiya Bhasha Parishad, Kolkata, Konarka Prize, 1994, for his short story book: Chalanti Thakura (The Living God)
- Sahitya Bharati Puraskar, 2004, by Gangadhara Ratha Foundation, for his life-time achievements and contributions to Odia literature
- Katha Puraskar, 2003, by Katha Bharati Foundation, New Delhi, for his Odia novel Anomara Kanya, translated into English as Anoma's Daughter
- Atibadi Jagannath Das Award, the highest honour given by the State, conferred by Sahitya Akademy, Odisha, for lifelong contribution to Odia literature and excellence, in a special ceremony, on 25 July 2014, at Bhubaneswar, Odisha
