= Hijab (Sufism) =

Concept in Sufism

In Sufism, the Hijab (Arabic: حِجَاب) is the divine veil that covers the qalb (heart) of the murid (a novice committed to spiritual enlightenment) before reaching the maqāmāt (stages) of the tajalli (disclosure of God as truth) and nūr manifestation (Light of God) of Allah's mercy. It is not a physical entity.

== Presentation ==
The Hijab can be seen as an invisible veil that hides the target of the salik quest from his qalb.

This curtain hides Allah mercy and His tajalli from the Sufi when he practices the Awrads.

Thus, the Holy Hijab is the pinnacle step of the salik way in the Sufi Tariqa to reach the Haqiqa in its outer form and its inner meaning.

In the initial stages of the travel to Allah's mercy, the Salik is veiled by the Hijab while the Majzoob is attracted to reach and overcome this divine veil.

== Ghaflah ==
When the salik is tainted with the ghaflah (Arabic: غَفْلَة), his qalb cannot grasp and taste with dhawq the glimmers of the divine nūr, and the Hijab covers and envelops his heart to make it hermetic to the heavenly waridates.

By dint of sincere niyya and perseverance in the practice of awrads and ibadates, the salik gradually begins to leave the ghaflah to enter fully into the Yaqadhah (Arabic: يَقَظَة) which makes it transit to the maqām of the Majzoob which attracted by the purity of the Hijab and what it masks as sacred things.

== Tajalli ==
While the Salik continues his quest for the haqiqa that springs when the Hijab rises from his qalb, the Majzoob is attracted by divine grace to approach this Hijab and thus enjoy the Tajalli of the divine Anwars which guide him to practice more of Ibada and Dhikr and Awrads to thank his creator for his favors and karamat that surround him.

This unveiling of the Hijab on the qalb of the wasil and the majzoob reveals the Tajalli which is a manifestation which shows and brings out the favors and special gifts of Allah bestowed on his servant.

The Tajalli manifestation also indicates that the divine Asrar became apparent in the qalb of the murid by means of the light of the Ma'rifa and the Irfan of Almighty Allah.

== Ma'rifa ==
This is how the Sufi adheres to a sphere of absolute knowledge called Ma'rifa when the Hijab reveals itself from his qalb after he has passed through the maqāmāt and aḥwāl of the Talibe, Murid, Salik, Majzoob and Wasil.

The Hijab thus opens the door of the mystical Ma'rifa to the sincere Sufi who rigorously pursued the legal path of Sharia, was assiduous in the esoteric method of Tariqa and received the mystic truth of the Haqiqa.

== See also ==
- Tajalli
- Nūr
- Ghaflah
- Secret
