= Muqarrab (Sufism) =

Concept of Sufism

The Muqarrab (Arabic: مُقَرَّبٌ) is a major spiritual stage (maqām) that the murids and saliks (novices and followers of Sufism) reach in their ascetic quest within Islamic Sufism.

== Presentation ==
Being close to God (Allah) is one of the main goals of worship (ibadah) and mysticism (Sufism) in the religion of Islam.

This proximity accompanied by intimacy and modesty allows the Muslim to escape the idleness of the ghaflah and thus to reach the firmament of fanaa in which personal human attributes are diluted and dissolved in order to leave room for contemplation and the ishq accompanying the baqaa state which returns the Sufi to the commonality of mortal life while maintaining his radiant qalb in the state of yaqeen.

Islamic ethics and deontology of this path of spiritual rapprochement must keep the murid in the wake of the rabbaniyya which does not aim to accomplish fantastic feats as much as it aspires to live hidayah and ma'rifa in a peaceful and moderate way.

== Approach and attraction ==
The subject related to the situation of the murid in his journey towards God (Allah) faces two complementary concepts leading him towards the maqām of wasil.

Indeed, this journey consists on the one hand of an approach (Arabic: اقتراب) emanating from salik through his adoration (ibadah), dhikr, dua, awrad and wazifa, and on the other hand of an attraction (Arabic: تقريب) emanating of God through the anwar and asrar.

The spiritual approach and attraction allow the Sufi to remain rigorous in the practice of the five pillars of Islam and the precepts of fiqh and sharia, and this while transcending his worldly life by aspiring to the taste (dhawq) of truth (haqiqa).

At no time during the ahwal of his spiritual life can the Muslim discharge himself from the religious obligations which lead him to approach the divine veil (hijab), even if he experiences along the way manifestations of attraction to the like khawatir, ilham, kashf, and even more karamat and tajalli.

== Precautions ==
Even if the ascetic doubts that he evolves in the sphere of the wali, he must not forget that the ihsan consists in perfecting his rite and dogma in order to please God, and this because the irfan, the ishrak, the wilayah are not an end in themselves, but it is the acceptance of the servant by his Creator that is central to Muslim spirituality.

Even though the ecstasy of this spiritual advancement and this celestial solicitation allows the salik to feel the barakah of the blessed views of the basirah, he must not allow himself to be drawn into the extreme and radical dogmatic modes of isloltrianist rahbaniyyah, wanton shath, and the depraved and perverse zandaqa, for righteousness (istiqama) remains the hallmark that describes the pious and humble Muslim.

== See also ==
- Siddiq
- Majzoob
