= Warid (Sufism) =

Concept in Islamic sufism

The wārid (plural: wāridāt) is the concept in sufism—a body of mystical practice within Islam—that explores the divine effect of dhikr and wirds practice on the qalb of murid and salik and wasil.

== Presentation ==
The warid is a result of dhikr in the Sufi tradition, and while the wird can be seen as an offering from the murid to Allah above the seven heavens, the warid can be seen as a retribution from the Angelic host to the qalb of the salik or wasil.

The murid accesses with his awrades to transcendent knowledge and spiritual status.

== Blessings ==
The waridates have impacts on murids and saliks depending upon their ability to receive them.

This litany can cause absence with the flow of these waridates on the murid's qalb.

== Kinds ==
The warid is present in the practice of murids, saliks and wasils under different genres:

- Barakah
- Basira
- Bast
- Djadba
- Fath
- Haqiqa
- Hidayah
- Ilham
- Irfan
- Ishrak
- Karamat
- Kashf
- Khatir
- Ma'rifa
- Nūr
- Qabdh
- Rabita
- Ru'ia
- Sirr
- Tajalli
- Uns
- Walayah

== Citations ==
- Ahmad ibn Ajiba said:

The word warid means the traveler and one who comes. It is said, 'So-and-so warada to us,' meaning he came to us. In the technical nomenclature (of the Sufis), the warid is what is gifted by the Real Allah upon the hearts of His saints, the gifts of gentle breezes that grant them the power to move, and perhaps startles them or removes them from their sensory perception. By its nature, it comes suddenly and does not remain for long.

— Ahmad ibn Ajiba, Definition of the warid, Īqāẓ al-himam fī sharḥ al-ḥikam

- Ibn Ata Allah al-Iskandari said:

No one belittles the litany (wird) except a man who is exceedingly ignorant. The warid is to be found in the Hereafter, while the litany vanishes with the vanishing of this world; therefore, it is more fitting to be occupied with something for which there is no substitute. The litany (wird) is what He seeks from you; the warid is what you seek from Him. What comparison is there between what He seeks from you and what you seek from Him!

— Ibn Ata Allah al-Iskandari, Definition of the warid, Kitab Al-Hikam

== Misconducts ==
Hazem Abu Ghazaleh said about Sufis' misconducts about the waridates:

Some Seekers (murids) might leave their daily litanies (wirds), arguing that they have too much work to do and too little free time. Their personal devils whisper to them and suggest that this is a legally valid excuse and an acceptable justification, and that it is perfectly fine to delay the litanies until there is free time. The esteemed Sufis have warned the spiritual wayfarers from negligence, procrastination, and waiting for free time.

Some seekers (saliks) might leave their litanies (wirds) and suffice themselves with the warid. They are seemingly unaware that the litany (wird) is sought from them as a means of drawing near to Allah, and that the esteemed Sufis have never neglected their litanies (wirds), no matter what degree of perfection they attained.

— Hazem Abu Ghazaleh, Misconducts of the warid, Questions and Answers on Sufism

== See also ==
- Wird
