= Majzoob (Sufism) =

Concept of Sufism

In Sufism, the Majzoob or Majzub (Arabic: مَجْذُوب, plural: مَجَاذِيبٌ majazib, majazeeb) is a mystical station (ḥāl) that the Muslim saint (wali) underwent in his journey within Islamic sufism to reach the posture (maqām) of reacher (wasil) and perfect man (al-Insān al-Kāmil).

== Presentation ==
Majzoobs are such murids whose hearts (qulub) are soaked, immersed and illuminated with anwar and asrar even before they engage in adhkar and awrad.

They do not first engage in dhikr until God illumines their hearts and guides them from the very inception.

After being illumined with divine lights, they engage in recitation and invocation which is not a hard task for them because in their state it is just as breathing is.

Duncan Forbes said:

Majzub, attracted, abstracted

— Duncan Forbes, A Dictionary, Hindustani & English, Page 668.

John Thompson Platts said:

Majzub (Drawn, attracted; carried away (by), abstracted; absorbed (in), lost (in)): One whom God has drawn to himself; a madman; an ascetic much given to divine meditation.

— John Thompson Platts, A Dictionary of Urdū, Classical Hindī, and English, Volume 1, Page 1002.

Ra Gohar Shahi said:

Faiz without the required knowledge will turn the aspirant into a Majzoob (an enlightened person who lost the intellect in God's love).

— Ra Gohar Shahi, The Religion of God (Divine Love): Untold Mysteries and Secrets of God, Page 20.

Muḥammad Fasī al-Dīn said:

While it would not be strictly true to define the Majzoob as an eccentric recluse, he is so exercised in bringing his soul in touch with the Divine Essence as to be practically oblivious of what goes on around him.

— Muḥammad Fasī al-Dīn, Kings of the East, Pages 99-100.

Since the Majzoob is a wasil who has approached and reached the pinnacle of Sufism, the Sufis ascribe Karamat and powers to them, from helping others miraculously to knowing matters of Al-Ghaib

== Difference with Salik ==
The wali who is characterized by attraction and soaking, is distinguished, from other salikin saints who are characterized by behavior, in that he receives from God selection and care without much religious practice (ibadah) of remembrance (dhikr) and rituals (awrad), thus reaching the station (maqām) of the linker (wasil).

Syed Yusuf Shahab said in his book The Lost Sufis of Delhi:

The journey results in two different attribute of temperament, that is “majzoob” and “saalik”. Majzoobs are those who lose themselves and devote to god that they forget world and in search of peace they want to spend their life in loneliness. On another hand, Saaliks are those, who are close to Allah, they perform their worldly duties with keeping in mind of their duties.

— Syed Yusuf Shahab, The Lost Sufis of Delhi, Page 3.

== Legality ==
The Islamic legality of majzoob's position is stated in the Quran in several verses:

- Verse 58 of Surah Maryam shows that seeking refuge (Arabic: اجْتِبَاءٌ) and guidance (hidayah) is one of the favors (ni'ma) of God Almighty over some of His chosen and selected servants, and among them are those who are attracted (majazeeb):
وَمِمَّنْ هَدَيْنَا وَاجْتَبَيْنَا

English: Several translations of the meaning:
1- And of those We ˹rightly˺ guided and chose.
2- And from among those whom We guided and chose.
3- Of those whom We guided and chose.
4- And from those We guided and selected.
5- And from among those We guided and chose.
(Quran: 19:58)

- Verse 13 of Surah Ash-Shura shows that seeking refuge (Arabic: اجْتِبَاءٌ) is a favor (Arabic: نِعْمَةٌ) of God Almighty, and guidance (hidayah) is offered to the assiduous and humble practitioner:
اللَّهُ يَجْتَبِي إِلَيْهِ مَن يَشَاءُ، وَيَهْدِي إِلَيْهِ مَن يُنِيبُ

English: Several translations of the meaning:
1- Allah chooses for Himself whoever He wills, and guides to Himself whoever turns ˹to Him˺.
2- Allah chooses for Himself whom He wills, and guides unto Himself who turns to Him in repentance and in obedience.
3- Allah chooses to Himself those whom He pleases, and guides to Himself those who turn (to Him).
4- God chooses to Himself whom He wills, and He guides to Himself whoever repents.
5- Allah chooses for it whomever He wishes and He guides to it whomever returns penitently.
(Quran: 42:13)

== Practice ==
When the chosen majzoob receives the divine flow (faydh) of the ma'rifa, the irfan and the haqiqa, he finds himself in a situation of sublimation (Arabic: اصطلام) due to this spiritual ascent (Arabic: التَّرَقِّي) unexpected and sudden, and therefore a whole directive of conduct must taint his subsequent behavior (suluk (Sufism)) in order to attain the approval and acceptance of his Lord.

He must then look for a sheikh or murshid proven and confirmed in Sufism to accompany him in his return to the worldly life of Muslims through a prolapse (Arabic: التَّدَلِّي) from this position of ecstasy to a form of moderate ritual practice (ibadah) according to sharia and righteousness (istiqama), and he will then be named salik.

If this attraction is pure generosity (karamat) from the Lord, then the etiquette of the slave (abd (Islam)) requires him to abide by the modesty of this generous gift through his commitment to uprightness in his desires, laws and commands stipulated in the Quran and Sunnah in order to achieve true servitude (ubudiyya).

Ibn al-Banna al-Sarqasti composed a poem in which he described the need of the devotees of God, among them the majazeeb, for a guide and a sheikh who guides them to the signs of true worship:

وَإِنَّمَا الْقَوْمُ مُسَافِرُونَ ***** لِحَضْرَةِ الْحَقِّ وَظَاعِنُونَ
فَافْتَقَرُوا فِيهِ إِلَى دَلِيلٍ ***** ذِي بَصَرٍ بِالسَّيْرِ وَالْمَقِيلِ
قَدْ سَلَكَ الطَّرِيقَ ثُمَّ عَادَ ***** لِيُخْبِرَ الْقَوْمَ بِمَا اسْتَفَادَ

Translation:

But the people are travelers ***** to the haḍra of Al-Haqq and they are walking
So they lacked a murshid in it ***** who has sight in journey and siesta
He took the road and then came back ***** to tell the people what he benefited from

== Misconducts ==
When the majzoob practices the awrad without moderation and balance, this insanity can cause a permanent physical and mental abuse to the Sufi.

People in this abused state can be seen like crazy and vagabonds near the tombs of the Sufis and in isolated places.

Sometimes, the Sufis glorify the state of these majazeeb claiming that they have not acquired this state but that it is something bestowed.

== See also ==
- Abd (Islam)
- Arif (Sufism)
- Faydh
- Istiqama
- Ni'ma
- Suluk (Sufism)
- Ubudiyya
