= Tazkiyah =

Islamic term for self-purification

Tazkiyah (Arabic: تزكية) is an Arabic-Islamic term alluding to tazkiyat al-nafs, meaning 'sanctification' or 'purification of the self'. This refers to the process of transforming the nafs (carnal self or desires) from its state of self-centrality through various spiritual stages towards the level of purity and submission to the will of God. Its basis is in learning the shariah (Islamic religious law) and deeds from the known authentic sunnah (traditions and practices of the Islamic prophet Muhammad) and applying these to one's own life, resulting in spiritual awareness of God (being constantly aware of his presence, knowledge omniscience, along with being in constant remembrance or dhikr of him in thoughts and actions). Tazkiyah is considered the highest level of ihsan (religious social responsibility), one of the three dimensions of Islam. The person who purifies themself is called a zaki (Arabic: زكيّ).

Tazkiyah, along with the related concepts of tarbiyah (self-development) and ta'lim (training and education) does not limit itself to the conscious learning process. It is rather the task of giving form to the act of righteous living itself: treating every moment of life with remembering one's position in front of God.

== Etymology ==
Tazkiyah originally referred to pruning a plant—to remove what is harmful to its growth. When the term is applied to the human personality, it means to beautify it and remove from it all evil traces and spiritual diseases that are obstacles to experiencing God. In Islam, the ultimate objective of the religion and shariah (Islamic law), and the real purpose of raising prophets from among mankind, is performing and teaching tazkiyah.

The term encompasses two meanings: one is to cleanse and purify from adulterants, while the other is to improve and develop towards the height of perfection. Technically, it conveys the sense of checking oneself for erroneous tendencies and beliefs, turning them to the path of virtue and piety (fear of God's displeasure), and developing them to attain the stage of perfection.

The word zakat (alms tax) comes from the same Arabic verbal root, since zakat purifies an individual's wealth by recognition of God’s right over a portion of it. It finds its origin in the Quranic command to: "Take sadaqah (charity) from their wealth in order to purify them and sanctify them with it" (Surah At-Tawbah 9:103). Other similarly used words to the term are Islah-i qalb ('reform of the heart'), Ihsan ('beautification'), taharat ('purification'), Ikhlas ('purity'), qalb-is-salim ('pure/safe/undamaged heart') and lastly, tasawuf (Sufism), which is an ideology rather than a term, mostly misinterpreted as the idea of sanctification in Islam.

== In scripture ==
=== In Quran ===
The word tazkiyah is used in many places in the Qur'an. It is used 18 times in 15 verses of 11 surahs; in verses 129, 151, 174 of surah Al-Baqarah, in verses 77 and 164 of sura Al-Imran, the verse of Nisa 49, verse 103 of surah Taubah, verse 76 of surah Taha, in the second verse of surah Al-Jumm'ah, verses 3 and 7 of surah Abasa, in verse 14 of surah al-A'la, verse 9 of surah Shams and in verse 18 of surah al-Layl.

=== In hadith ===
The word tazkiyah is also found in a few hadith, also meaning to purify and sanctify. (Note: These are Sahih Muslim: 2603, Shaih Muslim: 5500, Musnad Ahmad: 69, Bukhari: 4193, Muslim: 256, Muslim: 7230, Bukhari: 4661, Tirmidhi: 3377, Bukhari: 4550 and Ibn Majah: 4042.)

== Importance ==
Anas Karzoon said tazkiyah al-nafs: "is the purification of the soul from inclination towards evils and sins, and the development of its fitrah towards goodness, which leads to its uprightness and its reaching ihsaan."

Al-Khatib al-Baghdadi said in his "Tarikh" on the authority of Jabir that Muhammad returned from one of his campaigns and told his companions: "You have come forth in the best way of coming forth: you have come from the smaller jihad to the greater jihad." They said: "And what is the greater jihad?" He replied: "The striving (mujahadat) of Allah's servants against their idle desires."

== Process ==
The initial awakening to purification refers to recognition that the spiritual search is more important and meaningful than our previously valued worldly goods and ambitions. The process of tazkiyat al-nafs starts with "Verily deeds are according to intentions" and ends with the station of perfect character, Ihsan, "Worship Him as though you see Him", the reference being to the first hadith in Sahih Bukhari and the oft-referred hadith famously known as the hadith of Gibril in Sahih Muslim. Ihsan is the highest level of iman that the seeker can develop through their quest for reality. This is referred to as al-yaqin al-haqiqi; the reality of certainty and knowing that it brings true understanding and leads to al-iman ash-shuhudi, the true faith of witnessing the signs of Allah's Oneness everywhere. The only higher level of realization is maqam al-ihsan. At this station of perfection, the seeker realizes that Allah is observing them at every moment.

Saudi cleric Khalid Bin Abdullah al-Musleh listed seven obstacles in the way of tazkiyah in his book "Islahul Qulub" (reforming the hearts):

1. Shirk
2. Rejecting Sunnah and following Bid'ah
3. Obeying the instinct and ego (nafs)
4. Doubt
5. Negligence (ghaflah)

Ha also listed eight ways to maintain tazkiyah:

1. Reading the Quran
2. Loving Allah
3. Doing dhikr
4. Tawbah and Istighfar
5. Supplicate (dua) for hidayah and purify
6. Remembering afterlife (Akhirah)
7. Reading the biographies of the salafs
8. Company of good, honest and pious people

=== Maintaining the nafs ===
Professor A.J. Arberry, in his Sufism said: "the maqām is a stage of spiritual attainment on the pilgrim's progress to God, which is the result of the mystic's personal efforts and endeavor, whereas the hal is a spiritual mood depending not upon the mystic but upon God." The Muslim philosopher Abd al-Karīm ibn Hawāzin al-Qushayri (b. 986 Nishapur, Iran, d. 1074) summarized the difference between the two concepts in his Ar-Risāla-fi-'ilm-at-taşawwuf, where he maintained that, "states are gifts, the stations are earnings."

Tazkiyah is a continuous process of purification to maintain spiritual health. Similar to the process of maintaining physical health, any lapse in the regimen can cause one to lose their previous gains, and thus caution must always be used to not deviate from the path. Regarding this, it has been related that Imam Muhammad al-Busayri asked Shaykh Abul-Hasan 'Ali ibn Ja'far al-Kharqani (d. 1033) about the major seventeen negative psychological traits or mawāni' (impediments) which the sālik must avoid in their struggle towards purification. If the sālik does not rigorously abstain from these aspects, their efforts will be wasted. Known as al-Akhlaqu 'dh-Dhamimah (the ruinous traits), they are also referred to as the Tree of Bad Manners:

==== Stages of nafs (inner-self) ====
There are three principal stations of nafs or human consciousness that are specifically mentioned in the Qur'an. They are stages in the process of development, refinement and mastery of the nafs.

1. Nafs-al-ammārah: unruly animal self or soul that dictates evil.
2. Nafs-al-lawwāmah: struggling moral self or self-reproaching soul.
3. Nafs al-mutma'inna: satisfied soul or the composed God realized self.

===== The animal nafs (nafs-al-ammārah) =====
The Sufi's journey begins with the challenge of freeing oneself from the influence of Shaytan and the nafs-al-ammara. Al-Kashani defines it as follows: the commanding soul is that which leans towards the bodily nature (al-tabī'a al-badaniyya) and commands one to sensual pleasures and lusts and pulls the heart (qalb) in a downward direction. It is the resting place of evil and the source of blameworthy morals and bad actions. In its primitive stage the nafs incites mankind to commit evil: this is the nafs as the lower self or the base instincts. In the eponymous surah of the Qur'an, the prophet Yusef says "And I do not seek to free myself from blame, for indeed the soul is ever inclined to evil, except those shown mercy by my Lord." (Q 12:53) Here he is explaining the circumstances in which he came to be falsely imprisoned for the supposed seduction of Zuleikā, the wife of the King's minister (ʻAzīz).

===== The reproachful nafs (nafs-al-lawwama) =====
If the soul undertakes this struggle it then becomes nafs-al-lawwama (reproachful soul): this is the stage where "the conscience is awakened and the self accuses one for listening to one's selfish mind. The original reference to this state is in surah Qiyamah:

And I do swear by the self-reproaching soul!

— Quran 75:2

The sense of the Arabic word lawwama is that of resisting wrongdoing and asking God's forgiveness after becoming conscious of wrongdoing. At this stage, one begins to understand the negative effects of a habitual self-centered approach to the world, even though they do not yet have the ability to change. One's misdeeds now begin to become repellent to them, and one enters a cycle of erring, regretting mistakes, and then erring again.

====== Tree of good manners ======
1. Akhlaq-i-Hamidah – good character
2. As-Sidq – truthfulness

====== Tree of bad manners ======
1. al-ghadab – anger: considered the worst of all the negative traits. It may easily be said that anger is the source from which the others flow. The Prophet states in a hadith: "Anger (ghadab) blemishes one's belief." Controlling anger is called kāzm.
2. al-hiqd – malice or having ill-will toward others; grows from lusting for what someone else has. You must replace hiqd with kindness and look upon your brother with love. There is a tradition that says "give gifts to one another, for gifts take away malice."
3. al hasad – jealousy or envy; a person inflicted with this disease wants others to lose blessings bestowed on them by Allah.
4. al-'ujb – vanity or having pride because of an action, possession, quality or relationship.
5. al-bukhl – stinginess: The cause of bukhl is love of the world, if you did not love it, then giving it up would be easy. To cure the disease of miserliness, one must force oneself to be generous, even if such generosity is artificial; this must be continued until generosity becomes second nature.
6. al-tama – greed: excessive desire for more than one needs or deserves. Having no limit to what one hoards of possessions! Seeking to fulfill worldly pleasures through forbidden means is called tama’. The opposite of tama’ is called tafwiz, which means striving to obtain permissible and beneficial things and expecting that Allah will let you have them.
7. al-jubn – cowardice: the necessary amount of anger (ghadab) or treating harshly is called bravery (shajā'at). Anger which is less than the necessary amount is called cowardice (junb). Imam Shafi says, "a person who acts cowardly in a situation which demands bravery resembles an ass." A coward would not be able to show ghayrat for his wife or relatives when the situation requires it. He would not be able to protect them and thus will suffer oppression (zulm) and depreciation (ziliat).
8. al-batalah – indolence or Sloth (deadly sin): batalah is inactivity resulting from a dislike of work.
9. al-riya’ – ostentation or showing off: riya’ means to present something in a manner opposite to its true nature. In short, it means pretension, i.e., a person's performing deeds for the next world to impress the idea on others that he is really a pious person with earnest desire of the akhirah while in fact he wants to attain worldly desires.
10. al-hirsh – attachment and love for the material world, such as desiring wealth and a long life.
11. al-'azamah – superiority or claiming greatness: the cure is to humble oneself before Allah.
12. al-ghabawah wa 'l-kasalah – heedlessness and laziness; "the heart needs nourishment, and heedlessness starves the spiritual heart."
13. al-hamm – anxiety: this develops from heedlessness. The seeker must first understand that Allah is al-Razzaq (the Provider), and submit and be content with the will of Allah.
14. al-ghamm – depression: passion (hawā) conduces to anguish (ghamm) whenever reason is allowed to represent itself as grievous or painful the loss of the suitable or desirable and is, therefore, a "rational affection" that can cause the soul untold suffering and perturbation.
15. al-manhiyat – Eight Hundred Forbidden Acts
16. ghaflah – neglect and forgetfulness of God, indifference: those guilty of ghaflah, the ghāfilün, are those who "know the worldly affairs of this life, but are ˹totally˺ oblivious to the Hereafter" (30:7).
17. kibr – arrogance or regarding one's self to be superior to others. The Prophet states in a hadith: "A person who has an atom's weight of conceit in his heart will not enter Paradise." The opposite of arrogance is tawādu’, which is a feeling of equality.
18. hubb ul-dunya – love of the material world: Materialism. According to a hadith, Muhammed has said that "love of the world is the root of all evil." If this ailment is treated and cured, all other maladies flowing from it will also disappear.

The sālik must purify himself from these bad traits and rid his heart of the underlying ailments that are at their source. Outward adherence to the five pillars of Islam is not sufficient: he must be perfect in behavior. This requires a program of self-evaluation, purification, seclusion and establishing a practice of remembrance and contemplation under the guidance of an authorized Shaykh of Spiritual Discipline (shaykh at-tarbiyyah). In this way the seeker is able to achieve a state in which his heart is ready to receive Divine Inspiration and observe Divine Realities.

===== The nafs at peace (nafs-i-mutma'inna) =====
The Qur'an explains how one can achieve the state of the satisfied soul in sura Ar-Ra'd: "Those who believe and whose hearts find comfort in the remembrance of Allah. Surely in the remembrance of Allah do hearts find comfort (tatmainnu alquloobu)." ^{[Quran 13:28]} Once the seeker can successfully transcend the reproachful soul, the process of transformation concludes with nafs-al-mutma'inna (soul at peace). However, for some Sufis orders the final stage is nafs-as-safiya wa kamila (soul restful and perfected in Allah's presence). The term is conceptually synonymous with Tasawwuf, Islah al-Batini etc. Another closely related but not identical concept is tazkiah-al-qalb, or cleansing of the heart, which is also a necessary spiritual discipline for travelers on the Sufi path. The aim is the erasure of everything that stands in the way of purifying Allah's love (Ishq).

The aim of tazkiah and moral development is to attain falah or happiness, thus realizing the nafs al-mutma'inna. This is the ideal stage of mind for Sufis. On this level one is firm in one's faith and leaves bad manners behind. The soul becomes tranquil, at peace. At this stage Sufis have relieved themselves of all materialism and worldly problems and are satisfied with the will of God. Man's most consummate felicity is reflecting Divine attributes. Tranquillization of the soul means an individual's knowledge is founded on such firm belief that no vicissitudes of distress, comfort, pain or pleasure can alter his trust in Allah and his expecting only good from Him. Instead, he remains pleased with Allah and satisfied with His decrees. Similarly, the foundations of deeds are laid in such firm character that no temptations, in adversity, prosperity, fear or hope, removes him from the shar'iah, so he fulfills the demands made by Allah and thus becomes His desirable servant.

According to Qatada ibn al-Nu'man, the nafs al-mutma'inna is, "the soul of the believer, made calm by what Allah has promised. Its owner is at complete rest and content with his knowledge of Allah's Names and Attributes..."

In surah Fajr of the Quran (89:27-30), Allah addresses the peaceful soul in the following words:

89:27 يَا أَيَّتُهَا النَّفْسُ الْمُطْمَئِنَّةُ

Yā ayyatuhā alnnafsu almutmainnatu
˹Allah will say to the righteous,˺ “O tranquil soul!

89:28 ارْجِعِي إِلَى رَبِّكِ رَاضِيَةً مَّرْضِيَّةً

Irji'aī ilā rabbiki radiyatan mardiyyatan
Return to your Lord, well pleased ˹with Him˺ and well pleasing ˹to Him˺.

89:29 فَادْخُلِي فِي عِبَادِي

Fāodkhulī fī 'aibādī
So join My servants,

89:30 وَادْخُلِي جَنَّتِي

Wāodkhulī jannatī
and enter My Paradise.”

== Sufi views ==
=== Maqamat of Tazkiah ===
The level of human perfection is determined by discipline and effort. Man stands between two extremes, the lowest is below beasts and the highest surpasses the angels. Movement between these extremes is discussed by `ilm al-akhlaq or the science of ethics. Traditional Muslim philosophers believed that without ethics and purification (tazkiah), mastery over other sciences is not only devoid of value, but obstructs insight. That is why the Sufi saint Bayazid al-Bustami has said that, 'knowledge is the thickest of veils', which prevents man from seeing reality (haqiqah).

Sufi Brotherhoods (ṭarīqa pl. ṭuruq) have traditionally been considered training workshops where fundamental elements of tazkiah and its practical applications are taught. Sufis see themselves as seekers (murīdūn) and wayfarers (sālikūn) on the path to God. For proper training, murīdūn are urged to put themselves under the guidance of a master (murshid). The search for God (irāda, ṭalab) and the wayfaring (sulūk) on the path (ṭarīq) involve a gradual inner and ethical transformation through various stages. Although some have considerably more, most orders adopted seven maqāmāt (maqam pl. maqamat, a station on the voyage towards spiritual transformation). Although some of these stations are ascetical in nature, their primary functions are ethical, psychological and educational: they are designed as a means for combating the lower-self (mujāhadat al-nafs) and as a tool for its training and education (riyāḍat al-nafs).

In one of the earliest authoritative texts of Sufism, the Kitāb al-luma’, Abu Nasr al-Sarraj al-Tusi (d. 988), mentions seven maqāmāt that have become famous in later movements, they include:

- Repentance (tawbah): Begins with nur-e-ma'rifat (light of Divine Recognition) in the heart that realizes sin is spiritual poison. This induces regret and a yearning to compensate for past shortcomings and determination to avoid them in the future. Tawbah means regaining one's essential purity after every spiritual defilement. Maintaining this psychological state requires certain essential elements. The first is self-examination (muhasabah) and the other is introversion or meditation (muraqabah).
- Abstention (wara): Pious self-restraint: the highest level of wara' is to eschew anything that might distract one, even briefly, from the consciousness of Allah. Some Sufis define wara as conviction of the truth of Islamic tenets, being straightforward in belief and acts, steadfast in observing Islamic commandments, and careful in one's relations with God.
- Asceticism (zuhd): Doing without what you do not need and making do with little. It is the emptiness of the heart that doesn't know any other commitment than what is in relation to God, or coldness of the heart and dislike of the soul in relation to the world. Such renowned Sufi leaders as Sufyan al-Thawri regarded zuhd as the action of the heart dedicated to Allah's approval and pleasure and closed to worldly ambitions.
- Poverty (faqr): Poverty, both material and spiritual. This means denial of the nafs demands for pleasure and power, and dedication to the service of others instead of self-promotion. A dervish is also known as a fakir, literally a poor person. Poverty means lack of attachment to possessions and a heart that is empty of all except the desire for Allah.
- Patience (ṣabr): Essential characteristic for the mystic, sabr literally means enduring, bearing, and resisting pain and difficulty. There are three types: sabr alal amal (consistent in practicing righteous deeds); sabr fil amal (patience in performing a righteous deed); sabr anil amal (patience in abstaining from haram). In many Quranic verses Allah praises the patient ones, declares His love for them, or mentions the ranks He has bestowed on them: "O believers! Seek comfort in patience and prayer. Allah is truly with those who are patient." (2:153)
- Confidence (tawakkul): At this stage we realize everything we have comes from Allah. We rely on Allah instead of this world. There are three fundamental principles (arkan) of tawakkul: ma'rifat, halat and a'mal. The condition for achieving tawakkul is sincere acknowledgement of tauheed.
- Contentment (riḍā’): Submission to qaḍā (fate), showing no rancor or rebellion against misfortune, and accepting all manifestations of Destiny without complaint. According to Dhul-Nun al-Misri, rida means preferring God's wishes over one's own in advance, accepting his Decree without complaint, based on the realization that whatever God wills and does is good. The state where pain is not felt is called riḍā-e-tab'i (natural): when riḍā’ prevails with pain it is riḍā-e-aqli (intellectual). The first state is a physical condition and is not incumbent. The second is an intellectual condition, which is required: results from muhabbat (love for Allah).

Sufi sheikhs such as 'Alā' al-Dawlah Simnāni have described the maqāmāt in terms of the 'seven prophets' of one's inner being, with each prophet corresponding to one of man's inner states and also virtues. Others like Khwājah 'Abdallah Ansāri have gone into great detail in dividing the stages of tazkiah into a hundred stations. Nonetheless, through all these descriptions the main features of the stations marking the journey towards Allah are the same. One of the finest accounts of maqāmāt in Sufism is the Forty Stations (Maqāmāt-i Arba'in), written by the eleventh century murshid Abū-Sa'īd Abul-Khayr.

=== Māmulāt of Tazkiah ===
In order to combat and train the lower-self, Sufis practice fasting (ṣawm), food and drink deprivation (jūʿ'), wakefulness at night for the recitation of Quranic passages (qiyām al-layl), periods of seclusion (khalawāt), roaming uninhabited places in states of poverty and deprivation, and lengthy meditations (murāqaba, jam' al-hamm). The effortful path of self-denial and transformation through gradual maqāmāt is interwoven with effortless mystical experiences (aḥwāl).

The Persian murshid Abu al-Najib al-Suhrawardi further described this process by saying that it is only through constancy in action for God ('aml li- allāh), remembrance (dhikr allāh), recitation from the Quran, prayers and meditation (muraqabah) that a mystic can hope to obtain his objective, which is ubudiyyah – perfect obedience to Allah. Another practice that is often associated with Sufism is the spiritual concert, or "listening," samā', in which poetic recitations, music and dances are performed by the participants, sometimes in states of ecstasy and elation. Most Sufi ṭuruq have established graded programs in which initially every new seeker (murīdūn) is educated in the ritual known as zikr-al-lisani (zikr with the tongue) and is finally taught zikr-al-qalbi, which is practiced from the onset.

== Salafi views ==
Although highly critical of numerous Sufi practices, Muhammad ibn Abd al-Wahhab states:

"We do not negate the way of the Sufis and the purification of the inner self (i.e., tazkiah) from the vices of those sins connected to the heart and the limbs as long as the individual firmly adheres to the rules of Shari‘ah and the correct and observed way. However, we will not take it on ourselves to allegorically interpret (ta’wil) his speech and his actions. We only place our reliance on, seek help from, beseech aid from and place our confidence in all our dealings in Allah Most High. He is enough for us, the best trustee, the best mawla and the best helper."

== See also ==
- Islah
- Istighfar
- Taharat
- Tasawwuf
- Tawbah

== Bibliography ==
- J.M. Cowan (1994), The Hans Wehr Dictionary of Modern Written Arabic
- John Esposito (2003), The Oxford Dictionary of Islam
- Jean-Louis Michon (1999), The Autobiography of a Moroccan Soufi: Ahmad ibn 'Ajiba (1747–1809)
- M. Masud (1996), Islamic Legal Interpretation: Muftis and Their Fatwas
- Imam Ali, Nahjul Balagha: Sermons, Letters & Sayings of Imam Ali
- Muhammad Al-Munajjid - Prophet's Methods Of Correcting People's Mistakes - (English)
- Anas Karzoon (1997), Manhaj al-Islaami fi Tazkiyah al-Nafs
- Ahmad Farid, The Purification of the Soul: Compiled from the Works of Ibn Rajab al-Hanbali, Ibn al-Qayyim and Al-Ghazali.
- S.D. Goitein (1964), Jews and Arabs
- Annemarie Schimmel (1975), Mystical Dimension of Islam
- G. Böwering (1980), The Mystical Vision of Existence in Early Islam
- C. Ernst (1984), Words of Ecstasy in Sufism
- J.S. Trimingham (1982), The Sufi Orders in Islam
- L. Lewisohn (ed.) (1999), The Heritage of Sufism, 3 vols.
- A. Knysh, Islamic Mysticism. A Short History (2000)
- Khalid bin Abdullah al-Musleh (2004), Reform of the hearts (in Urdu)
- Khondokar Abdullah Zahangir (2007), Rahe Belayet (The way to friendship of Allah) (in Bengali)
- Shaykh Imran ibn Adam, Tasawwuf and Tazkiyah
- The meaning and origin of Akhlaq
- The Path of the Wayfarer
