= Ahl al-Khutwa =

Ahl al-Khutwa (Arabic: أهل الخطوة; People of step) is an adjective that people call individuals among Sufis and Walis who possess the supernatural ability and Karamat to travel a very long distance in one step.

== Presentation ==
This power can be applied in the blink of an eye, so that the Saints are not obstructed by a sea or a mountain, or the ability to be in more than one place at the same time.

The people of the step are the ones for whom the land is folded and the travel distance is shortened in front of them, among the righteous servants of Allah Almighty. It was said that Sheikh Ahmad Zarruq was one of the people of the step.

It is also said that the people of the step are people who claim that they are able to travel the distance in a step, such that, in one moment they are in Algeria, and at the other moment in the Hijaz, and they are not obstructed by a sea or a mountain, and they have strange stories about that; their story about people who reside in a country, then they pray each Salah on time in the Masjid al-Haram of Mecca and the Al-Masjid an-Nabawi of Medina.

Imam Abu Madyan was a relief from the lords of the qouloubs and the kashf and the owners of the step in folding the earth and moving in the blink of an eye to distant places, whether by diving into the ground or by rising in the sky.

Among the righteous Saints and Walis of Allah, those who were the People of the step could cut between the Maghreb and the Machrek in a short time, and some of them were walking in the air.

== Misconducts ==
Some disobedient people may have the property of folding the ground by making them step and shortening distances; If one of them is in Mecca, or wherever he wants in the country.

This may be subtle and can lead to being expelled from the mercy of Allah, as it is in the right of the accursed Iblis, and whoever has its course is among the people of shortcomings and faults.

Since the people of Sufism believe in the existence of men of the People of step, if it is a karamat, then it must remain a secret between God and its owner, and there is no need to reveal it.

== Shortening the prayer ==
A Muslim can shorten his quadruple prayer, like the Salah Musafir, even if he crosses this distance in an instant because he is one of the "People of step", whether he crosses it on land or sea.

Among the dignities of Imam, Hasan al-Basri used to pray the five daily prayers in Makkah, while he was residing in Basra, by using Salah Musafir.

== See also ==
- Karamat
- Salah Musafir
