= Rūḥ =

Spirit in Islam that issues from the command of God, often referred to archangel Gabriel

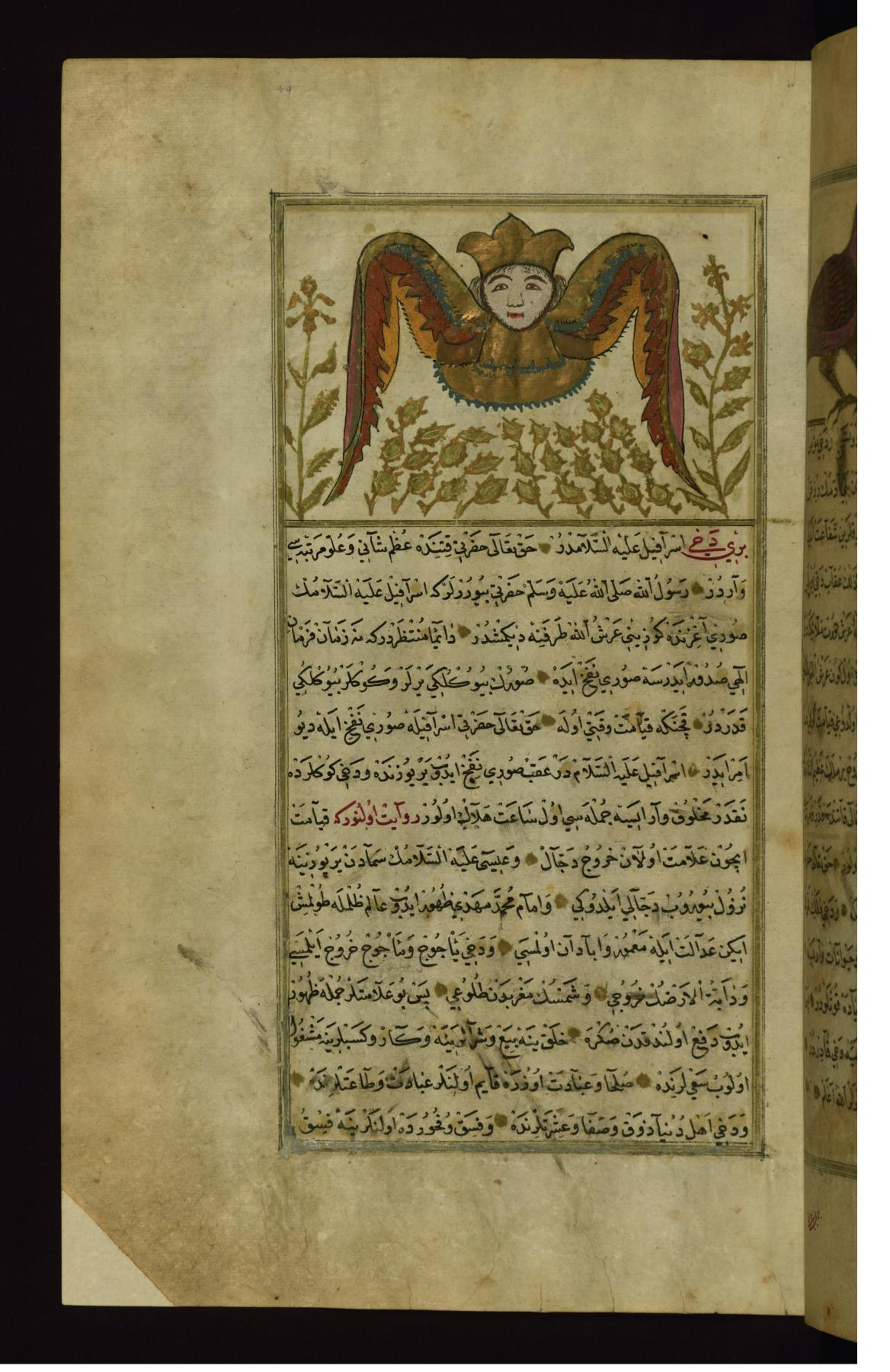
Muhammad ibn Muhammad Shakir Ruzmah-'i Nathani - A Soul Symbolized as an Angel

Rūḥ or The Spirit (Arabic: الروح, al-rūḥ) is mentioned twenty one times in the Quran, where it is described as issuing from command of God. The spirit acts as an agent of divine action or communication.

The Quran describes the rūḥ in various ways. It refers to ruh as (Arabic: الروح القدس al-rūḥ al-qudus), which means 'the holy spirit' and ar-rūḥ al-amin, which means 'the faithful' or 'trustworthy spirit', terms that are commonly understood to be references to the archangel Gabriel. The Quran also refers to ruh as God's own spirit ("My/His Spirit"), which was blown into Adam, and which is considered the source of human life. Most commentators interpret the phrase "My/His (God's) Spirit" in 15:29, 32:9 and 38:72 figuratively as God's power and way of honoring Adam, with some taking a more literal view. This spirit leaves the human body at death, and continues to exist in the afterlife. Further, ruh appears to be a metaphysical being, such as an angel.

== In the Quran ==
The word "ruh" appears 21 times in the Quran, and in five of those instances, it is used in conjunction with the verb "nafakha", meaning 'to blow', suggesting that it is related to blowing. Additionally, its usage is linked to concepts such as peace (97:4), assistance (58:22; 2:87), and life (15:29). In the Quran, the rūh is described as having the ability to infuse life into inanimate matter and perform other tasks beyond human comprehension. Its abilities are depicted as crossing vast distances and time spans, as it ascends to the heavens in a day that is fifty thousand years long (70:4) and animates lifeless objects. The Quran portrays rūh in different ways: as a person who obeys God and brings revelation, or as a general concept, particularly as the inspiration for Muhammad's prophetic messages. Rūh can take several forms as a person, most commonly as a metaphysical being similar to an angel (78:38), but it can also appear in human form, such as in the case of the rūh that interacts with Mary (19:17). The Quran even describes Jesus as rūh in one instance (4:171). Additionally, rūh is referred to as Rūh al-Qudus (the Holy Spirit), al-Rūh al-Amin (the Trustworthy Spirit), or simply al-Rūh, and My/His (God's) Rūh.

The Quran, however, doesn't offer a definitive explanation of the Spirit (al-ruh). It merely says in response to the question about the Spirit, "Say, "The Spirit (al-ruh) is from the Command of my Lord, and you have not been given knowledge, save a little"" (17:85), suggesting the unknowable nature of ruh. According to The Study Quran, the term "Spirit" may refer to the source of human life, as God breathes His Spirit into Adam (32:9). This led some Muslim thinkers to believe that the Spirit is the source of human knowledge, perception, and spiritual ability. Accordingly, the Spirit is also seen as the origin of religious, moral, and spiritual responsibility for human beings. The meaning of the phrase "I...breathed into him of My Spirit" (15:29; cf 38:72, 32:9) is interpreted differently by various commentators. Most commentators believe that "My or His Spirit" refers to God's power and a way of honoring Adam, with some understanding it more literally to refer to the Spirit (al-rūḥ) of God. The latter interpretation explains why Iblīs was commanded to bow before Adam. Rūh al-Qudus (the Holy Spirit), al-Rūh al-Amin (the Trustworthy Spirit) are generally understood as references to the archangel Gabriel.

== Holy Spirit or trustworthy spirit ==
Rūḥ al-qudus (Arabic: روح القدس, 'the holy spirit' or 'spirit of holines'), al-rūḥ al-amin (Arabic: الروح الأمين, 'the faithful/trustworthy spirit'), is a Quranic expression that describes a source or means of prophetic revelations, commonly identified with the angel Gabriel. Quranic commentators disagreed in their identification of Gabriel with various uses of the word rūḥ.

The phrase rūḥ al-qudus, commonly translated as the 'holy spirit' or the 'spirit of holiness', occurs four times in the Quran, in Quran 2:87 and 253, Al-Ma'idah verse 110, and An-Nahl verse 102. In three instances, it is described as the means by which God "strengthened" Jesus, and in the fourth it is identified as the one who brought down God's truth to his prophet.

=== As interpreted to refer to the Archangel Gabriel ===
The term Rūḥ al-Qudus is also an epithet referring to the Archangel Gabriel, who is related as the Angel of revelation and was assigned by God to reveal the Qurʼan to the Islamic prophet Muhammad and who delivered the Annunciation to Mary.

In the two suras in which the Qur'an refers to the angel Gabriel, it does so by name.

It appears to be indicated by the Quran in sura Maryam, ayat 17–21, that it was the angel Gabriel who gave to Mary the tidings that she was to have a son as a virgin:

screening herself off from them. Then We sent to her Our angel, ˹Gabriel,˺ appearing before her as a man, perfectly formed. She appealed, "I truly seek refuge in the Most Compassionate from you! ˹So leave me alone˺ if you are God-fearing." He responded, "I am only a messenger from your Lord, ˹sent˺ to bless you with a pure son." She wondered, "How can I have a son when no man has ever touched me, nor am I unchaste?" He replied, "So will it be! Your Lord says, ‘It is easy for Me. And so will We make him a sign for humanity and a mercy from Us.’ It is a matter ˹already˺ decreed."

— Surah Maryam 19:17–21

It is narrated in hadith that the angel Gabriel accompanied Muhammad during the Mi'raj, an ascension to the heavens in which Muhammad is said to have met other messengers of God and was instructed about the manner of Islamic prayer (Sahih al-Bukhari 349). It is also held by Muslims that the angel Gabriel descends to Earth on the night of Laylat al-Qadr, a night in the last ten days of the holy month of Ramadan, which is said to be the night on which the Qurʼan was first revealed.

The Arabic phrase al-Qudus (القدس) translates into English as 'Holiness' or 'Sanctity'. Not to be confused with al-Quddūs, 'the All-Holy', that is one of the 99 Names of God in Islam.

== As soul ==
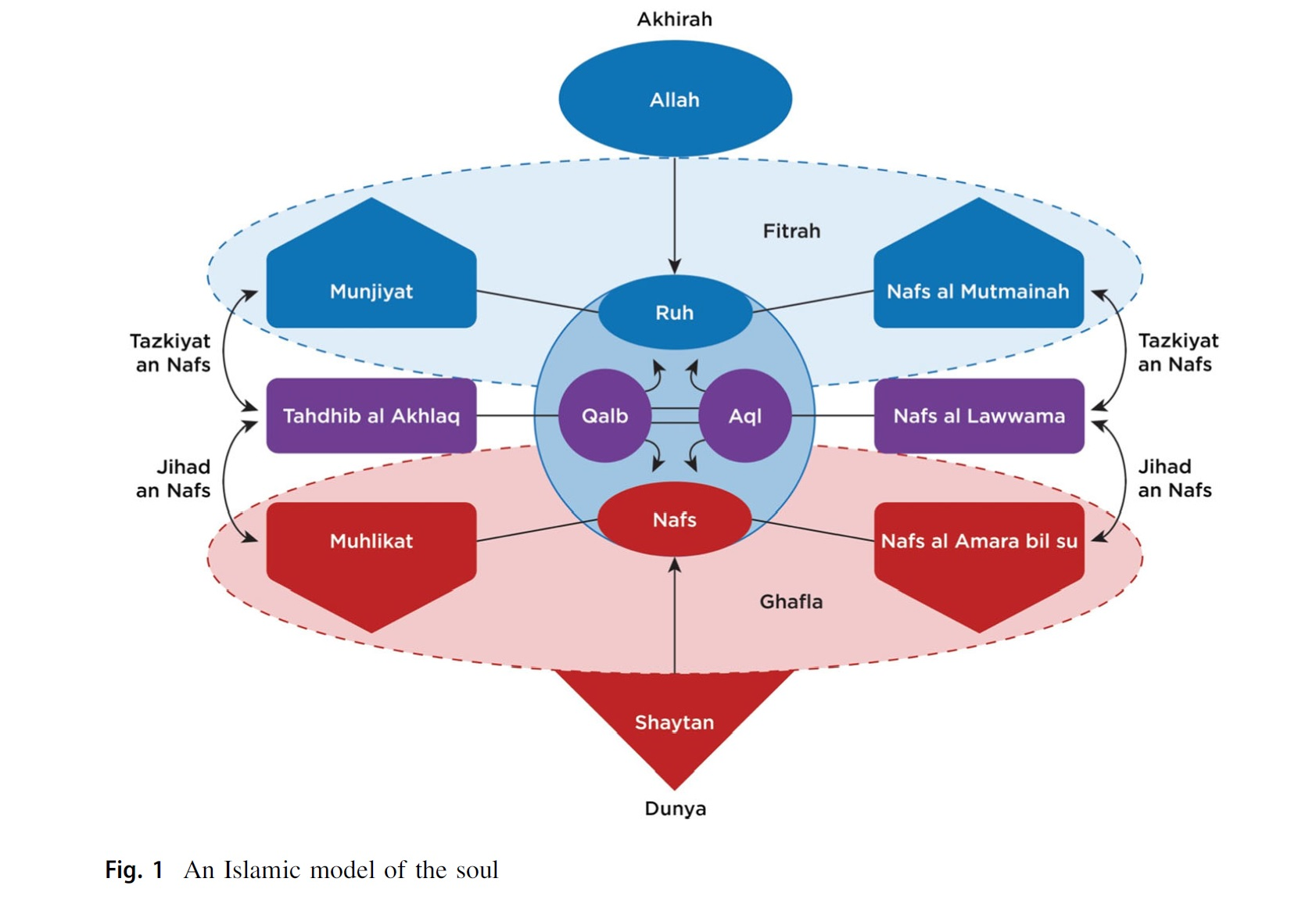
A visual rendition of the Islamic model of the soul showing the position of "ruh" relative to other concepts based on a consensus of 18 surveyed academic and religious experts.

God is believed to endow humans with rūḥ (رُوح) and nafs (نَفْس), (i.e. ego or psyche). The rūḥ "drives" the nafs, which comprises temporal desires and sensory perceptions. The nafs can assume control of the body if the rūḥ surrenders to bodily urges. The nafs is subject to bodily desire within the sadr ('the chest'), whereas the rūḥ is a person's immaterial essence, beyond the emotions and instincts shared by humans and other animals; rūḥ makes the body alive. In some accounts, some arwāḥ ('spirits') dwell in the seventh heaven. Unlike the angels, they are supposed to eat and drink. An angel called ar-Rūḥ ('the Spirit') is responsible for them.

Muslim authors, like Ghazali, Ibn Qayyim and Suyuti wrote in more detail about the life of ghosts. Ibn Qayyim and Suyuti assert, when a soul desires to turn back to earth long enough, it is gradually released from restrictions of Barzakh and able to move freely. Each spirit experiences afterlife in accordance with their deeds and convictions in the earthly life. Evil souls will find the afterlife painful by receiving punishment, and imprisoned until God allows them to interact with other souls. However, good souls are not restricted. They are free to come visit other souls and even come down to lower regions. The higher planes are considered to be broader than the lower ones, the lowest being the most narrow. The spiritual space is not thought as spatial, but reflects the capacity of the spirit. The more pure the spirit gets, the more it is able to interact with other souls and thus reaches a broader degree of freedom.

Sarra Tlili contends that the term "ruh" had a simple meaning of 'blown breath' during the time of the Quran's revelation. However, the Quran's use of the term introduces complexity as it attributes extraordinary agency and manifestations to it, which may have bewildered early Muslims. In order to reconcile their understanding with the Quranic depiction of ruh, they relied on the principles of God's creativity and omnipotence. Consequently, the concept of ruh evolved into a metaphysical entity with immense dimensions and extraordinary features that expressed God's majesty and the limits of human comprehension. Tlili believes that the attempt to define the Quranic ruh in early exegetical traditions as a specific entity already reveals an inclination "to reduce the unknowable to something imaginable", indicating a shift towards a more anthropocentric mode of thought.

In subsequent centuries, as the notion of soul started gaining ground in extra-quranic circles, it gradually started shaping the understanding of the quranic word ruh. Strangely, to corroborate the view that ruh in the Quran means soul, the verse that has been adduced the most is Q Isra’ 17:85 ("They ask you about ruh..."), the very verse that seems to say that ruh is unknowable to humans. Through the distorted prism of equating a non-quranic notion with a quranic word, ruh gradually ceased to be the elusive being known only to God, and even became the divine spark that eventually set humans apart from other animals. It should of course be noted that the process described here is gradual and long. This precludes the possibility of pinpointing any exact transitional points, or even identifying a straight linear direction. Nonetheless, a trend is discernible, along with an important factor that determined its direction: anthropocentric feelings.

— Sarra Tlili, From Breath to Soul: the Quranic word Rūh and its (Mis)interpretations, 2017

According to Sarra Tlili, the exegetes' interpretations of ruh were influenced by anthropocentric factors, such as their belief that God granted ruh to His most favored creatures, rather than their ability to decipher the Quranic term's true meaning. For Tlili, "God's power turned a breath into a supernatural being, but eventually humans managed to bring this being down to earth through (flawed) interpretative strategies, and in so doing they appropriated it in ways that served human ends." However, commentators acknowledged that despite feeling confident about their understanding of ruh, they ultimately did not fully comprehend it.

== Eschatological aspects ==
In Islamic belief, ruh departs from the human body at the time of death. The Qur'an implies that rūh continues to exist after leaving the body in death. However, it does not provide specific details about the period between burial and resurrection. In Islam, death is not considered to be the final end of life, but rather the termination of the appointed period during which humans are tested on Earth. As such, death is viewed as a "merely transitional phase during which the rūh, the principle of life, provisionally remains separated from the disintegrating body".

== As part of Lataif-e-sitta ==
Sufism teaches that, to attain Tajalli ar-rūḥ, (the ultimate manifestation of divine truth in the human soul) the Salik (Sufi aspirant), must cultivate the following 13 spiritual qualities or virtuous practices, thus facilitating the gradual awakening in order of the various centres or subtle plexuses of his/her jism latif (subtle body):

1. Irādah or commitment to God
2. Istiqāmah or steadfastness in the way with God
3. Hāya or shame in committing evil
4. Ḥurīyyah or freedom: Ibrahim Bin Adham said, "A free man is one who abandons the world before he leaves the world." Yaḥyā Bin Maz said, "Those who serve the people of the world are slaves, and those who serve the people of Ākhirah are the free ones." Abū ʿAlī Daqāq said, "Remember, real freedom is in total obedience. Therefore if someone has total obedience in God, he will be free from the slavery of non God."
5. Fatoot or manliness: Abū ʿAlī Daqāq said, "Manliness is in one's being of continuous service to others. This is a form of etiquette that was perfected by the Prophet Muhammad alone."
6. Ḥub or love for God
7. Aboodiyah or servitude under God
8. Muraqaba or complete focus on God
9. Duʿāʾ or prayer
10. Faqar or abandoning of materialism
11. Tasawwuf or wearing a dress of no material significance
12. Suhbat or company of the righteous ones
13. Adab or following protocols of respect for the great ones

== See also ==
- Islamic philosophy
- Sufi philosophy
- Sufi psychology
- 'Aql
- Fitra
- Nafs
- Qalb
- Taqwa

== Sources ==
- Tlili, Sarra (2017). "From Breath to Soul: the Quranic word Rūh and its (Mis)interpretations". In Lowry, J.E.; Toorawa, S.M. (eds.). Arabic Humanities, Islamic Thought: Essays in Honor of Everett K. Rowson. Islamic History and Civilization. Brill. ISBN 978-90-04-34329-0.
- Nasr, S.H.; Dagli, C.K.; Dakake, M.M.; Lumbard, J.E.B.; Rustom, M. (2015). The Study Quran: A New Translation and Commentary – Leather Edition. HarperCollins. ISBN 978-0-06-112588-1.
- Rothman, Abdallah; Coyle, Adrian (2018). "Toward a Framework for Islamic Psychology and Psychotherapy: An Islamic Model of the Soul". Journal of Religion and Health. 57 (5). Springer Science and Business Media LLC: 1731–44. doi:10.1007/s10943-018-0651-x. ISSN 0022-4197. PMC 6132620. PMID 29907906.
- Waardenburg, Jacques (2001). "Death and the Dead". In McAuliffe, J.D. (ed.). Encyclopaedia of the Qurʼān: A–D. Brill. ISBN 978-90-04-11465-4.
