= Hijab (disambiguation) =

Hijab is a veil worn by Muslim women.

Hijab or Hidjab may also refer to:

== Religion ==
- Hijab, is a concept in Sufism.
- Types of hijab, are styles of dress.
- Hijab by country, is an Islamic style of dress by country.
- World Hijab Day, is an event to encourage women to wear the hijab.

== People ==
- Hijab Imtiaz Ali (1908–1999), Indian writer, editor and diarist
- Riyad Farid Hijab (born 1966), prime minister of Syria in 2012
- Mohammed Hijab (born 1992), British Islamic preacher
- Wasfi Hijab (1919–2004), Palestinian mathematician and philosopher.
