= Talibe =

West African youth studying the Quran at a daara

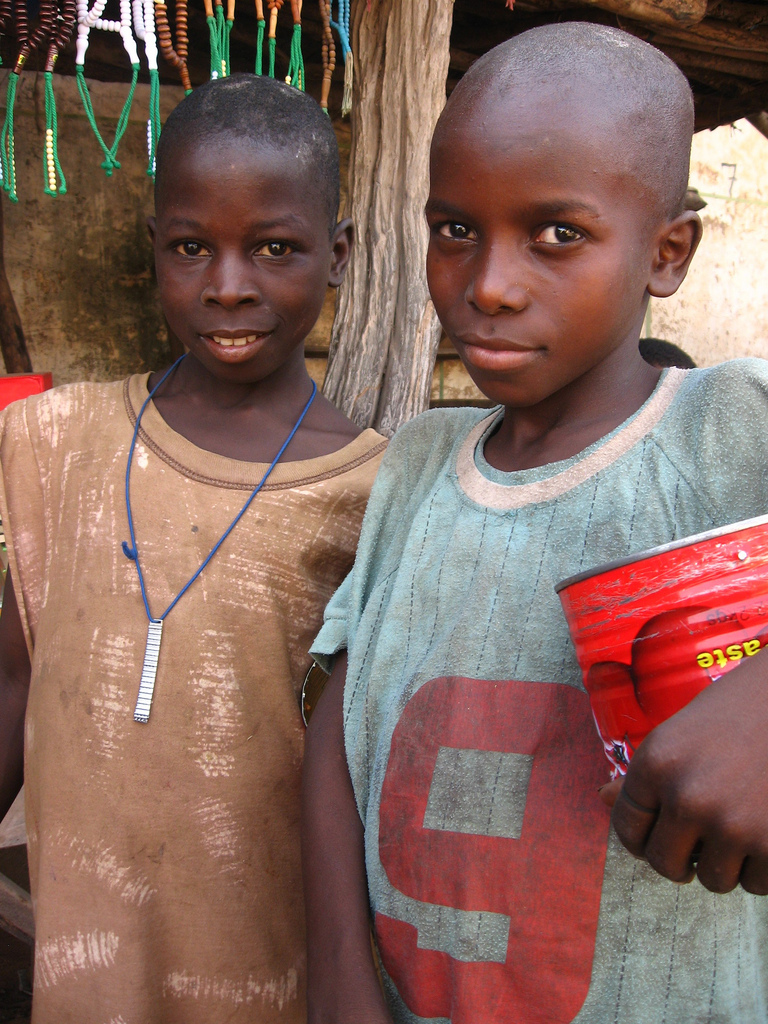
Two talibés boys in Vélingara, Senegal.

A talibé (also spelled talibe, plural talibés; Arabic: طالب, romanized: ṭālib, lit. 'seeker', 'student'; pl. طلاب ṭullāb) is a boy, usually from Senegal, the Gambia, Guinea, Guinea-Bissau, Chad, Mali or Mauritania, who studies the Quran at a daara (West African equivalent of madrasa). This education is guided by a teacher known as a marabout. In most cases talibés leave their parents to stay in the daara.

Within Senegal, the term talibé can be used in a wider context, “for instance to denote a militant adherent of a political party.”

== Overview ==
The talibé's relationship with his marabout is one of “devotion and strict obedience.” The marabout provides “guidance, protection, and intercession” for the talibé. A talibé's allegiance to his marabout is expressed through economic support or tithes.

The views on talibés in Senegalese society are diverse. Some individuals, ethnic groups and religious denominations promote the raising of talibés while others reject the practice. Among those who support it there is a range of views of the best way to manage a daara.

Many theories exist to explain the motivations of parents to send their children to a daara. These include; de facto fostering because of financial difficulties; securing a better future for the child by building a relationship with the Muslim brotherhood to which the marabout belongs, and; preparing the child for a career as a marabout. Donna L. Perry disagrees with those who portray parents of talibés as “ignorant traditionalists or economic victims,” and marabouts as being “warped by the stresses of modernity.” Based on interviews with Wolof farmers, she contends that the popularity of raising talibés remains essentially linked to West African values on child-rearing, rather than a response to “rampant population growth, intensified poverty, and neoliberal policy.” The framing of the plight of talibés in socio-economic terms is, according to Perry, an intentional strategy of NGOs to “avoid accusations of cultural imperialism.”

== History ==
Daaras have existed for hundreds of years. They grew in significance during the French colonial period. The number of rural daaras declined during the latter half of the 20th century in favour of Arab-styled medersas (madrasa). Medersas grew in popularity as they enabled farmers to keep their children working outside of school hours, provided a secular and Quranic education, and exposed children to fewer hardships. During this time many daaras moved to the cities.

In 1992, UNICEF launched a five-year operation to raise awareness about talibés, and sought to work alongside marabouts to improve talibes’ living conditions. In 1997, this work was picked up on an ad hoc basis by NGOs. These agencies sought to avoid the shortcomings of UNICEF's model which supplied marabouts with resources which were not always used for the benefit of talibés. Instead, these humanitarian groups worked directly with talibés. Talibés continue to be a topic of discourse in Senegalese society.

== Abuse of Talibes ==
=== Nature of the abuse ===
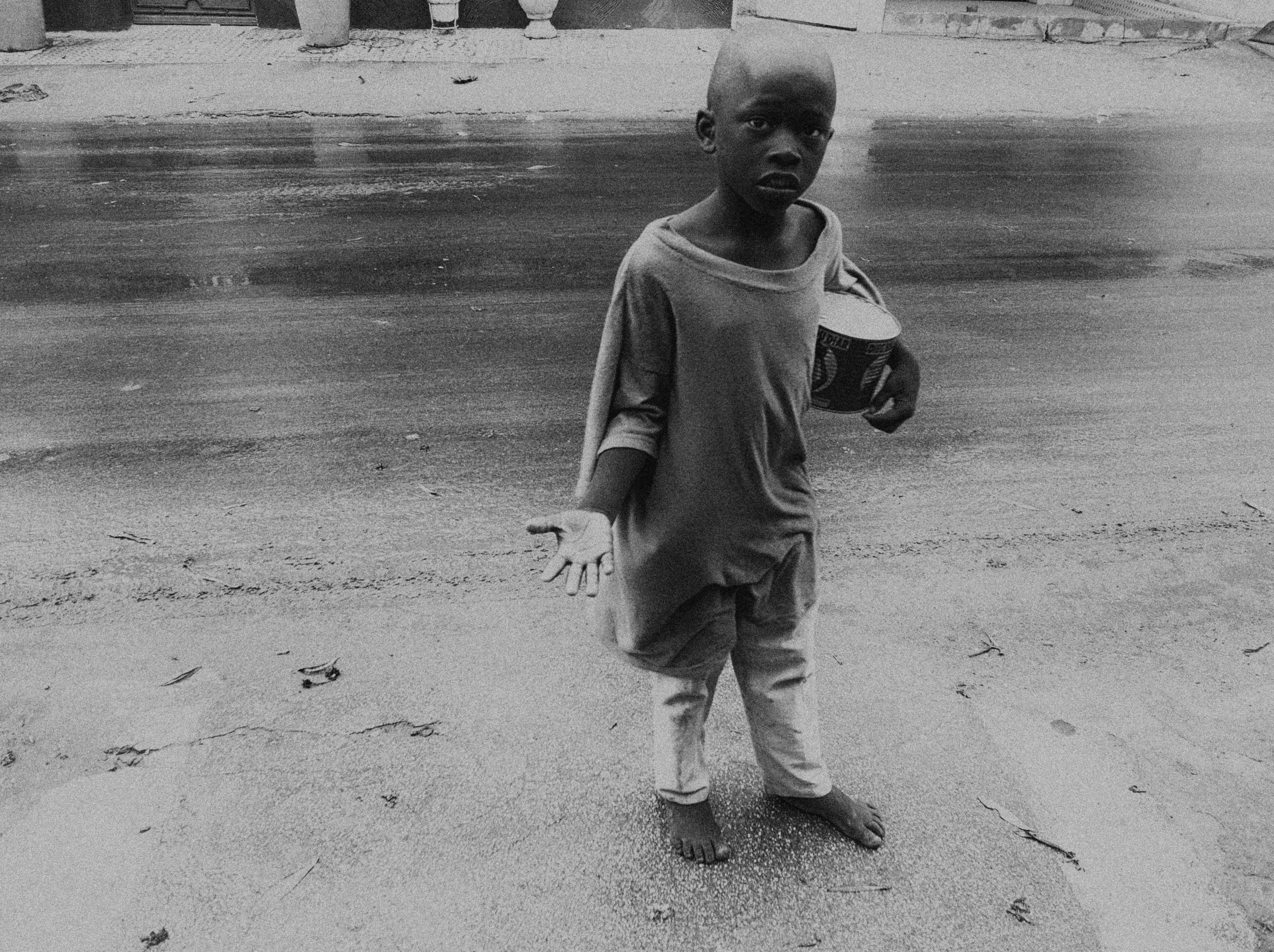
A begging talibé

Begging used to be characterised by the talibé asking for food to supplement the daara's supplies when it could not sustain its own demands from the harvests provided by the marabout's fields. The increasing number of daaras in urban settings has stemmed the traditional forms of support that sustained daaras. The prevalence of almsgiving in Senegalese society has made child begging profitable in cities. In the 1970s, some urban daaras ran seasonally, allowing for marabouts to return to their villages for the harvest. However, it became more economically viable for urban daaras to remain open all year round:

Over time, the marabouts started to stay in the cities…Why return to the village, where they had to work the land for long hours, when [in the city] a child comes daily with money, sugar, and rice?

Perry warns that the above view can imply that only urban daaras exploit talibés. She contends that urban and rural daaras “are the same. There is just one difference: the urban talibe’s ‘farm’ is the urban street, and [the] ‘crop’ he harvests is cash, and not peanuts.”

The practice of marabouts taking on talibés is seldom subject to state regulation, making it easier for abuse of this relationship to occur. The Senegalese government has recently created state-regulated daaras in order to reduce abuses. However, urban daaras with resident talibés form the most common form of Quranic schools.

Some marabouts, instead of teaching their talibés about the Quran, exploit them for labour, typically through forced begging on the streets. The nature of this exploitation exposes such talibés to disease, injury, death, physical abuse and sexual abuse.

A 2007 UNICEF study of child begging in Dakar, the capital of Senegal, found that "the large majority of child beggars (90%) are talibés". UNICEF has estimated there to be between 50,000 and 100,000 begging talibés in Senegal. A 2010 report suggests that the number of talibés is on the rise. Other researchers, however, warn that "estimates on the numbers of street children rest upon largely elastic and nebulous definitions." Indeed, there are no official statistics to substantiate these claims. Others respond that the rise of Arabic-maderas is causing the number of talibés to decline.

Human Rights Watch (HRW) has warned that the social status enjoyed by marabouts has emboldened "those responsible for the proliferation of forced child begging and other abuses committed by the marabouts against talibé children." Perry cautiously agrees that "reverence of marabouts and respect for the talibé institution may be a dominant ideology, but it is not now, nor ever was, totalising or uncontested".

Platform for the Promotion and Protection of Human Rights (PPDH) along with HRW, reported in December 2019 the overlooked abuse, exploitation and neglect of thousands of talibé children at traditional Quranic schools. The Senegalese government was accused of neglecting and not doing enough to tackle the widespread and chronic abuse faced by children at the religious schools.

The United Nations' Convention on the Rights of the Child (CRC) creates rights to adequate living standards for children, with regard to the means of the primary caregivers, as well as the means of the state to support the primary caregivers. HRW argues that states, parents and marabouts are in breach of CRC in failing to oversee the adequate housing, care and nourishment of talibés.

HRW also cites the following as other abuses of talibés which breach CRC.

- Forced begging; HRW argues that this exposes talibés to considerable dangers. HRW documented cases of talibés dying in car accidents while trying to beg on the streets. The exposure to dangerous work, HRW argues, not only threatens the physical and mental security of talibés, but their lives.
- Corporal punishment; physical punishments in schools has been described by the UN Committee on the Rights of the Child, as a type of violence which CRC seeks to stop.
- Education; HRW argues that, where a child's education is almost entirely neglected due to copious hours of begging, this may amount to a breach of CRC.
- Sexual abuse; CRC requires states to take steps to protect children from sexual abuse.
- Leisure; where a marabout denies talibés leisure time, this may breach the child's right “to rest and leisure.”

=== Forced labour and slavery ===
Recent studies show that talibés average just less than 8 hours per day, every day, begging. The exact sums that a talibé must yield each day vary between daaras. A survey of 175 talibes revealed that the average sum demanded by a marabout is 373 CFA (US$0.79), rising to 445 CFA (US$0.94) on holy days when greater almsgiving is customary. World Bank statistics show that just under 30 percent of Senegal's population lives on less than 593 CFA (US$1.25) per day, and over 55 percent live on less than 949 CFA (US$2.00). This highlights the difficulty talibés have in meeting the quotas requested by marabouts. In addition to financial quotas, some marabouts set quotas for basic foodstuffs such as sugar and rice.

The International Labour Organization (ILO) has opined that the practice of exploiting talibés for labour also falls within the ambit of the Convention on the Worst Forms of Child Labour. This is because, its opinion, forced begging is akin to slavery, and because the labour exposes children to a plethora of dangers to their wellbeing.

Some NGOs argue that, where a marabout acquires custody over a talibé in order to force the child to beg, this meets the definition of a practice ‘akin to slavery’, as defined by the Supplementary Convention on the Abolition of Slavery. That convention states that receiving a child “with a view to the exploitation of the child or young person or of his labour,” is a practice akin to slavery which is subject to the convention.

=== Physical abuse and torture ===
Talibés are sometimes required by their marabouts to meet a quota of money or basic foods. Failure to meet that quota can result in physical abuse. Human Rights Watch (HRW) documented boys exhibiting scars and welts, usually resulting from the application of electric cables, clubs and canes.

In some daaras, an older, senior talibé, or assistant marabout will be responsible for punishing younger talibés who fail to return their daily quota, or are late returning. In other cases, a marabout might not supervise the children living in the daara, leaving the senior talibés to steal from the younger, as well as abuse them physically and sexually.

The Convention against Torture only applies where the actions are carried out by a state official. However, the committee which oversees that treaty issued an opinion stating that:

[Where] State authorities…know or have reasonable grounds to believe that acts of torture or ill-treatment are being committed by…private actors and they fail to exercise due diligence to prevent, investigate, prosecute and punish such…private actors consistently with the Convention, the State bears responsibility and its officials should be considered as authors, complicit or otherwise responsible under the Convention for consenting to or acquiescing in such impermissible acts.

Given the punishments used against talibés, such as stress positions and chaining, HRW argues that this construction of the Convention indicates that instances of torture are occurring against talibés.

It has been reported by the Senegalese non-governmental organisation XALAAT, a leading institution that works to confront the issue in this country, that while the subject being very controversial, in some communities there are conclusive evidences that ill-treatment has always been very common practice in most of the traditional Koranic Schools called Daara. Additionally, this ngo is arguing to have efficiently brought practitioners in this field to connect together the different clusters that have until now ignored while considering the problem.

=== Sexual abuse ===
Little research has been done on the extent of sexual abuse of talibés. HRW, however, noted several of instances of rape in daaras by older talibés, or assistant marabouts. Other instances of rape were reported to have taken place outside of the daara against children living on the street who had fled from violence at their daara. These cases were recorded in interviews with talibés who witnessed the abuse, or with social workers assisting the victims.

=== Trafficking ===
Given the ILO's views on forced begging, HRW has argued that marabouts, when transporting talibés with the primary intention of obtaining labour from them, are engaging in child trafficking. Article 3(c) of the Trafficking in Persons Protocol includes in the definition of ‘trafficking in persons,’ the “recruitment, transportation, transfer, harbouring or receipt of a child for the purpose of exploitation.”

=== Inadequate care ===
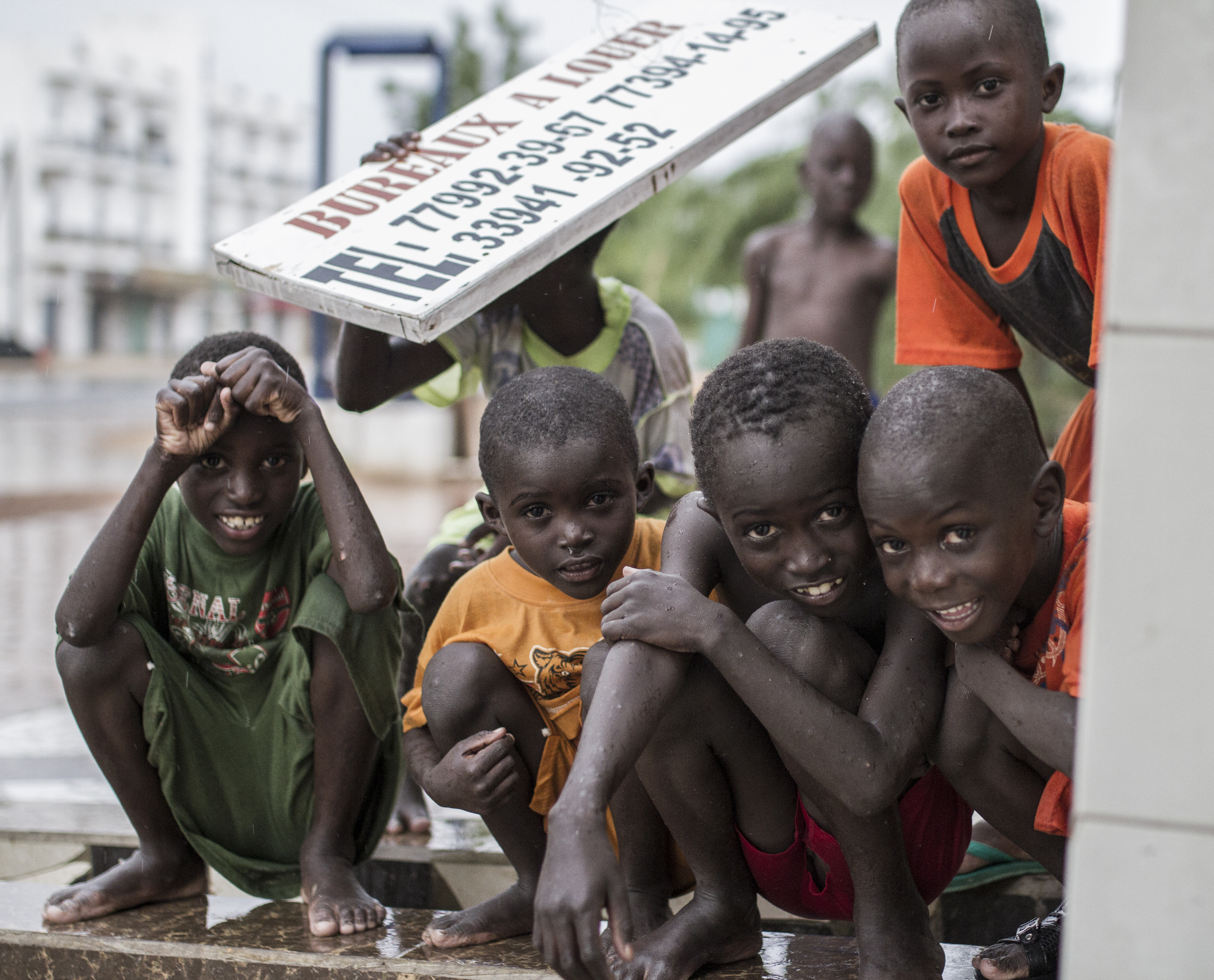
Talibe beggars in Senegal asking for alms

Talibés are seldom provided with necessities such as basic shelter and food. Some are punished for failing to meeting their quotas by being refused entry into the daara. This forces the child to sustain even longer hours begging, or to sleep on the streets. Hundreds of talibés are estimated to flee abusive marabouts every year, compounding the issue of street children in urban areas. The fear of punishments for not meeting the marabouts demands also increases instances of thefts by talibés.

Living conditions in urban daaras are often characterised by malnourishment, lack of clothing and footwear, exposure to illnesses, and poor medical treatment. In many cases, talibés are still required to beg while ill and to pay for their own treatment. Urban daaras are often sites of overcrowding and poor sanitation, and many lack running water. The poor structures which are sometimes converted into daaras leave the resident boys exposed to the elements.

== See also ==
- Child slavery
- Child Labour
- Madrasa
- Marabout
- Almajiri
- Murid
- Salik
- Wasil
- Majzoob
- Muqarrab
- Arif
