= Wird =

Litany and spiritual practice in Islam

The wird (plural: awrād) is a regular litany and a mystical invocation practiced by murids, saliks and wasils in Islamic sufism.

== Presentation ==
In Sufism, the murid's transformation and salvation is done by the practice of special disciplines such as performance of dhikr, remembrance of Allah and his prophet Muhammad, and wird as special invocations, and Quranic recitations, or doing Salah.

The wird is then viewed as a devotion or liturgy specific to a particular Sufi order or Tariqa in which the substance is defined and based on dhikr and wird.

Sufis designated specific times devoted to Allah and the specific dhikr recited on these occasions.

An initiate murid is given the secret wird of the Sufi order upon completion of training, transferring the spiritual power of the silsila of transmission from the founder of the order and Muhammad, to the initiate.

Taking wird is equivalent to full initiation into the Sufi tariqa.

== Benefits ==
Wird is like a spiritual medication taken by the murid every day under a sheikh supervision and named wazifa.

The most effective medication for the disease of ghaflah (heedlessness) is the dhikr performed in the form of wird.

The target in sufism is to awaken the qalb from ghaflah and bond it to almighty Allah, thus achieving eternal peace.

The primary, and easiest, way of achieving this is to occupy the qalb with constant dhikr.

Dhikr is the easiest and quickest way of bonding the qalb to almighty Allah.

The greatest merit of the wird of dhikr is that Allah Himself remembers the servant who remembers Him exclusively and in the Divine Presence.

== Kinds ==
The wird is present in the practice of murids, saliks and wasils under different genres:

- Dhikr
- Djamaa
- Djoua
- Dua
- Ibara
- Ichara
- Latifa
- Muhasabah
- Muraqabah
- Raising hands in Dua
- Sahar
- Samt
- Shuhud
- Sufism pillars
- Tafakur
- Tahara
- Tahlia
- Takhlia
- Tawajud
- Tawassul
- Tazkiah
- Uzla
- Wajd
- Zuhd

== See also ==
- Warid
