= Wasil (Sufism) =

Rank in Sufism

In Sufism, a wāṣil (Arabic: وَاصِل; 'one who reaches') is a murid or salik who accomplished and finished crossing the path of sulūk.

== Presentation ==
The wāṣil is the sufi who has reached the spiritual stage where the divine Hijab is unveiled on his qalb.

When the Hijab is unveiled on the qalb of the salik and the tajalli manifests itself before him, one speaks that the sufi has reached the maqam of the wuṣūl (Arabic: الوُصُول).

Indeed, the good niyyah of the murid to follow the mystical path of suluk introduces him into the phase of salik which hangs him on a spiritual cord which connects his qalb to divine mercy.

== Kinds ==
The wāṣil is presented in sufism according to several qualities which are:

- Siddiq
- Wali
- Al-Insān al-Kāmil
- Rabbani
- Majzoob
- Muqarrab
- Arif

== See also ==
- Talibe
- Murid
- Salik
