= Daara =

Senegalese traditional Quranic school

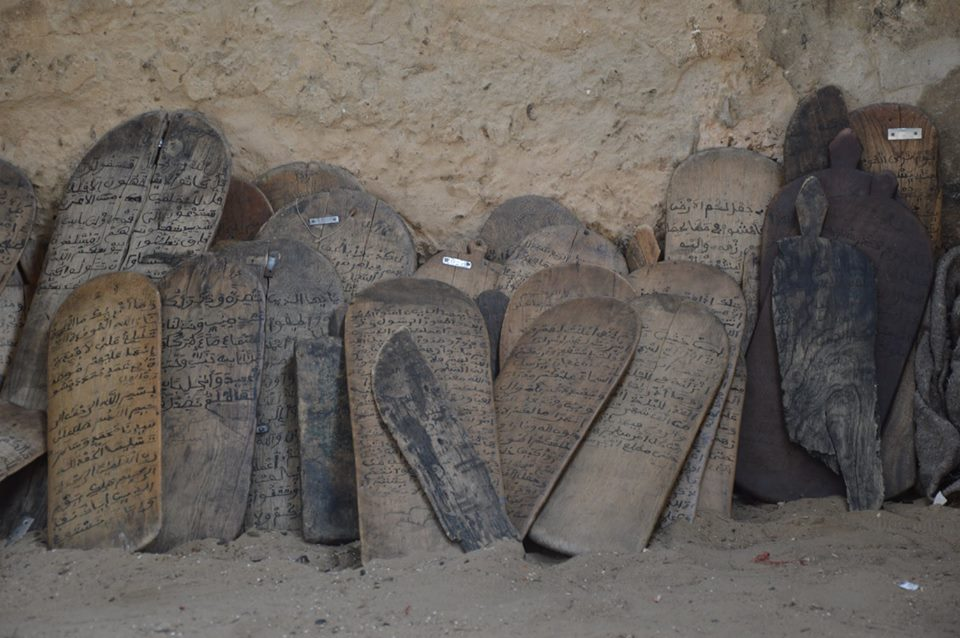
Wooden boards on which talibe children learn Quranic verses

Daara is the title used in Senegal to designate the traditional Quranic schools that have ensured for centuries that Islamic education was well spread out in all segments of population in the West African countries.

Daaras often implement physical punishment, which to many West African Muslims is considered to be an important part of the education process. The denomination conveys a very controversial portrait depending on the understanding one has of their usefulness in social progress. There have been frequent reports of abuse and "contemporary slavery" by organizations such as XALAAT and the United Nations. These reports include accusations of financial exploitation and ill-treatment of child beggars called talibe. Many talibe in Senegal deliberately self-harm so they will need medical attention and be removed from the daaras.
