= Nafs =

Quranic Arabic word for the "self"

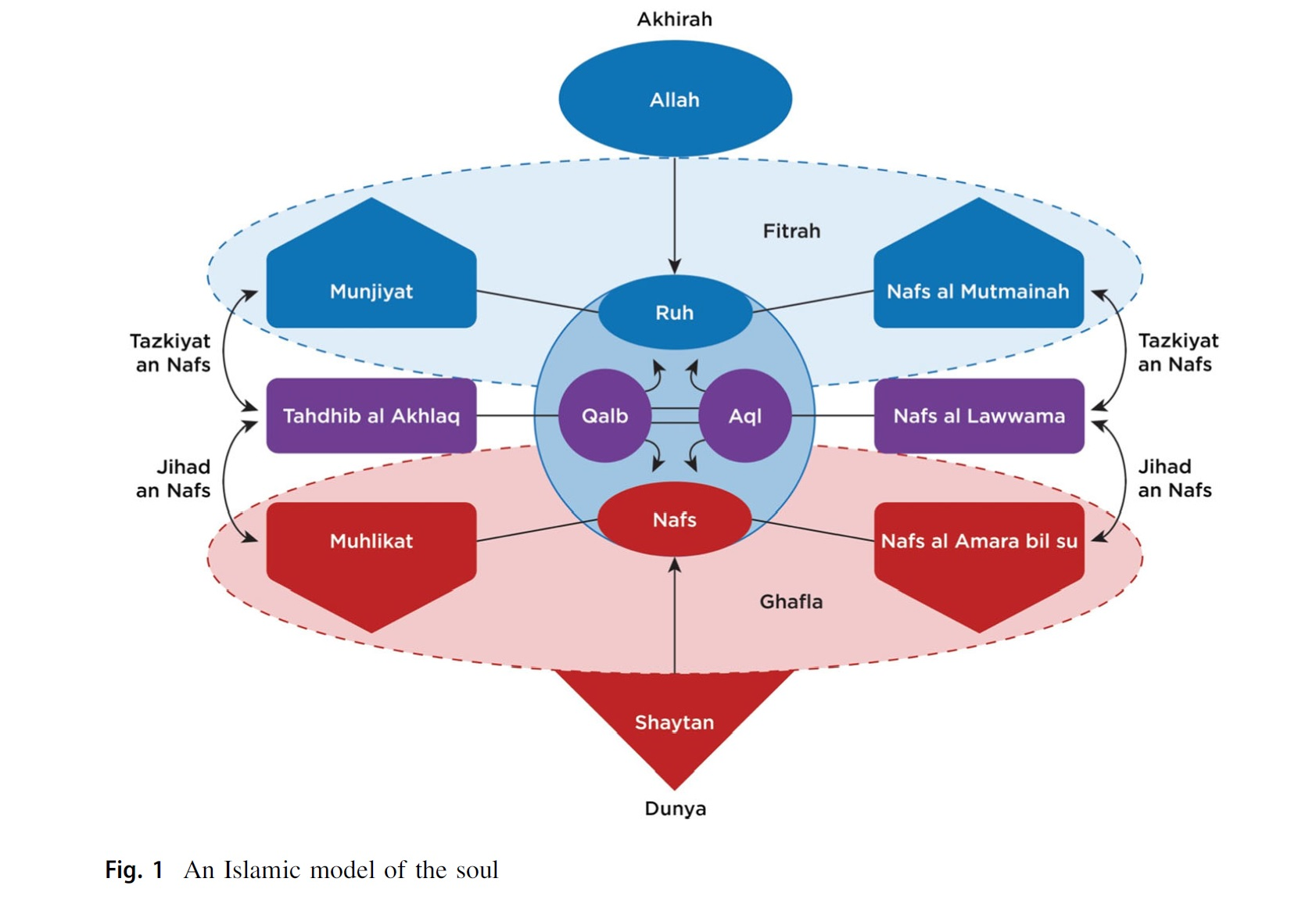
A visual rendition of the Islamic model of the soul showing the position of "nafs" relative to other concepts, based on a consensus of 18 surveyed academic and religious experts

Nafs (نَفْس) is an Arabic word occurring in the Quran, literally meaning "self", and has been translated as "psyche", "ego" or "soul". The term is cognate with the Hebrew word nephesh, נֶפֶשׁ. In the Quran, the word nafs is used in both the individualistic (verse 2:48) and collective sense (verse 4:1), indicating that although humanity is united in possessing the positive qualities of a nafs, they are individually responsible for exercising the agencies of the "free will" that it provides them.

Much of the popular literature on nafs, however, is focused on the Sufi conceptions of the term located within the sadr (the chest). According to the Sufi philosophies, the nafs in its unrefined state is "the ego", which they consider to be the lowest dimension of a person's inward existence—his animal and satanic nature. Nafs is an important concept in the Islamic tradition, especially within Sufism and the discipline of gnosis (irfan) in Shia Islam.

== Etymology ==
The word "nafs" is derived from the Arabic word "nafas", which means "breathing". In early Arabic literature, "nafs" refers to the "self" or "person". In Islamic theology, "nafs" refers to the soul, although it is sometimes confused with "ruh", which means "breath" or "wind", or "spirit". The concepts of "nafs" and "ruh" are similar to the Jewish concepts of "nephesh" and "ruach".

== Quranic concept ==
The triliteral root nūn fā sīn (ن ف س) occurs 298 times in the Quran, in four derived forms:

1. once as the form V verb tanaffasa (تَنَفَّسَ)
2. once as the form VI verb yatanāfasi (يَتَنَافَسِ)
3. 295 times as the noun nafs (نَفْس)
4. once as the form VI active participle mutanāfisūn (مُتَنَٰفِسُون)

The Quran affords much importance to the nafs of an individual, highlighting the agency of free will and intelligence, without which neither responsibility nor accountability can exist. The Quran does not attribute to the nafs any inherent properties of good or evil, but instead conveys the idea that it is something which has to be nurtured and self-regulated, so that it can progress into becoming 'good' and 'inwardly meaningful' through its thoughts and actions. The Quranic conception of the nafs therefore has an extremely modernistic undertone, much like German philosopher Friedrich Nietzsche's conception of "Übermensch" or 'Superman', as suggested by Muhammad Iqbal, a prominent Muslim scholar and philosopher, who went as far as to accuse Nietzsche of borrowing the term from Islamic thought. Iqbal stated: "It is probable that Nietzsche borrowed it (Übermensch) from the literature of Islam or of the East and degraded it by his materialism."

== Sufism's conception of nafs ==
The elimination of nafs is central for proper worship of God, according to the teachings of Sufism. Quzat Hamadani relates the termination of nafs to the shahada: Accordingly, people whose service for God is just superficial, are trapped within the circle of la ilah (the first part of shahada meaning "there is no God") just worshipping their nafs (bodily urges) rather than God. Only those found worthy succeed in leaving this circle and move to illa Allah, the "Divine presence".

=== Three principal stages ===
There are three principal stages of nafs in Sufistic Wisdom, also mentioned in different verses of the Quran. The Sufis call them "stages" in the process of development, refinement and mastery of the nafs.

=== The inciting nafs (an-nafs al-ʾammārah) ===
In its primitive stage the nafs incites people to commit evil; this is the nafs as the lower self, the base instincts. In the eponymous Sura of the Quran, Yusuf says "Yet I claim not that my nafs was innocent: Verily the nafs incites to evil."^{[Quran 12:53]} Islam emphasizes the importance of fighting the inciting nafs in Quran as well as in hadith. One tradition holds that Muhammad said after returning from a war, "We now return from the small struggle (Jihad Asghar) to the big struggle (Jihad Akbar)". His companions asked, "O prophet of God, what is the big struggle?" He replied, "The struggle against temptations."

This stage is generally divided into the levels al nafs al-hayawaniyya and al nafs al-iblissiyya. Al nafs al-hayawaniyya ("the animal state") describes the unconscious self, which, in its natural, unawakened state runs after material possession, sensual desires and animalistic pleasures. Al nafs al-iblissiyya (the devilish state) is even lower than the animal state, because in it the self, in its overweening pride, seeks consciously and deliberately to replace love for God with self-love.

The Quran enjoins the faithful "to hinder the nafs from lust",^{[Quran 79:40]} and another traditional narration warns that "the worst enemy you have is [the nafs] between your sides." Rumi warns of the nafs in its guise of religious hypocrisy, saying "the nafs has a rosary and a Koran in its right hand, and a scimitar and dagger in the sleeve."

Animal imagery is often used to describe the nafs. A popular image is a donkey or unruly horse that must be trained and broken so that eventually it will bear its rider to the goal. Rumi compares the nafs to a camel that the hero Majnun, representing the intellect ('Aql), strains to turn in the direction of the dwelling-place of his beloved.

=== The self-accusing nafs (an-nafs al-lawwāmah) ===
In Sura al-Qiyama the Quran mentions "the self-accusing nafs".^{[Quran 75:2]} This is the stage where "the conscience is awakened and the self accuses one for listening to one's ego. One repents and asks for forgiveness." Here the nafs is inspired by one's heart, sees the results of one's actions, agrees with one's brain, sees one's weaknesses, and aspires to perfection.

=== The nafs at peace (an-nafs al-muṭmaʾinnah) ===
In Sura al-Fajr the Quran mentions "the nafs at peace".^{[Quran 89:27]} This is the ideal stage of ego for Muslims. On this level, one is firm in one's faith and leaves bad manners behind. The soul becomes tranquil, at peace. At this stage, followers of Sufism have relieved themselves of all materialism and worldly problems and are satisfied with the will of God.

=== Four additional stages of nafs ===
In addition to the three principal stages, another four are sometimes cited:

The Inspired Nafs (an-nafs al-mulhamah)

This stage comes between the second (The self-accusing Nafs) and the third (the Nafs at peace) principal stages. It is the stage of action. On this level "One becomes more firm in listening to one's conscience, but is not yet surrendered." Once one have seen one's weaknesses and have set one's targets, this ego inspires one to do good. The Sufis say that it is important that whenever one think of good, one must immediately act upon it. Abbas Bin Abdul Muttalib lays down three rules:

1. Ta'Jeel or Swiftness. A good deed must be done immediately and there should be no laziness.
2. Tehqeer or Contempt. One must look at one's good acts with contempt otherwise one will become self-righteous.
3. Ikhfa or Secrecy. One must keep one's good acts secret otherwise people will praise one and it will make one self-righteous.

According to the Quran, charity should be given both secretly and openly. In Muhammad Asad's translation of the Quran, 14:31 reads: "[And] tell [those of] My servants who have attained to faith that they should be constant in prayer and spend [in Our way], secretly and openly, out of what We provide for them as sustenance, ere there come a Day when there will be no bargaining, and no mutual befriending."

The pleased nafs (an-nafs ar-raḍīyyah)

This stage comes after the third principal stage. On this level "one is pleased with whatever comes from Allah and doesn't live in the past or future, but in the moment." "One thinks always: 'Ilahi Anta Maqsudi wa ridhaka matlubi'. One always sees oneself as weak and in need of Allah."

The pleasing nafs (an-nafs al-marḍīyyah)

On this level the two Ruhs in man "have made peace". "One is soft and tolerant with people and has good Akhlaq (Arabic: أخلاق), good manners."

The pure nafs (an-nafs aṣ-ṣāfīyyah)

On this level "one is dressed in the attributes of the Insan Kamil, the perfected man, who is completely surrendered and inspired by Allah." One is "in full agreement with the Will of Allah".

=== Full sequence of nafs development ===
Therefore, the full sequence of the seven stages of the development of the nafs is as follows:

1. The inciting nafs (an-nafs al-ʾammārah)
2. The self-accusing nafs (an-nafs al-luwwāmah)
3. The inspired nafs (an-nafs al-mulhamah)
4. The nafs at peace (an-nafs al-muṭmaʾinnah)
5. The pleased nafs (an-nafs ar-raḍīyyah)
6. The pleasing nafs (an-nafs al-marḍīyyah)
7. The pure nafs (an-nafs aṣ-ṣāfīyyah)

Dervishes from the Jerrahi school of Sufism are encouraged to study a text describing these stages of nafs as a nested series of cities.

=== Characteristics of nafs in its primitive state ===
In its primitive state the nafs has seven characteristics that must be overcome:

1. Pride (Takabbur)
2. Greed (Tamaa)
3. Jealousy (Hasad)
4. Lust (Shahwah)
5. Backbiting (Gheebah)
6. Stinginess (Bokhl)
7. Malice (Keena)

=== Nafs and Jihād ===
According to Ṣūfī philosophy, the focus of self-improvement is on one's internal struggles rather than external enemies. Instead of searching for enemies outside oneself, in such groupings as one's family, community, or society, Sufism teaches that the primary enemy to be conquered is one's ego-sensibility or individual self, known as nafs. Thus, the goal of a Ṣūfī's life is to continually strive against their egocentric tendencies and battle their nafs. In Ṣūfīsm, the process of controlling the nafs involves renunciation (zuhd) and other techniques, which aim to protect the soul from negative influences and attain an elevated state of being referred to as "Godfearing" (khawf). This is considered a necessary step towards acquiring piety (taqwā) and ultimately realizing the Truth (al-ḥaqq). The Quran teaches that the one who "feared to stand before his Lord and restrained his nafs from the passions; indeed, paradise will be his refuge" (79:40–41). Junayd of Baghdad likened the process of overcoming the nafs to "dying to oneself and becoming resurrected in one-Self (God)". Muhammad said that "The powerful is not he who conquers people, but he who conquers his self". Sufis view the struggle against the nafs as a form of jihad (jihād-an-nafs), or inner struggle, and consider it the most important form of jihad (jihād-e akbarī). Success in this struggle means aligning oneself with the will of God rather than succumbing to satanic temptations.

== See also ==
- Fitra
- Qalb
- 'Aql
- Rūḥ
- Ghaflah
- Islamic psychological thought
- Lataif-e-sitta
- Seven deadly sins
- Nishimta in Mandaeism

== Sources ==
- Dastagir, Golam (2018). "Nafs". Islam, Judaism, and Zoroastrianism. Encyclopedia of Indian Religions. Dordrecht: Springer Netherlands. pp. 519–22. doi:10.1007/978-94-024-1267-3_2012. ISBN 978-94-024-1266-6. ISSN 2542-7628.
- Rothman, Abdallah; Coyle, Adrian (2018). "Toward a Framework for Islamic Psychology and Psychotherapy: An Islamic Model of the Soul". Journal of Religion and Health. 57 (5). Springer Science and Business Media LLC: 1731–44. doi:10.1007/s10943-018-0651-x. ISSN 0022-4197. PMC 6132620. PMID 29907906. S2CID 49240804.
