= Murid =

Aspirant practitioner of Sufism

In Sufism, a murīd (Arabic مُرِيد 'one who seeks') is a novice committed to spiritual enlightenment by sulūk (traversing a path) under a spiritual guide, who may take the title murshid, pir or shaykh. A sālik or Sufi follower only becomes a murīd when he makes a pledge (bayʿah) to a murshid. The equivalent Persian term is shāgird.

The initiation process of a murīd is known as ʿahd (Arabic: عَهْد) or bai'ath. Before initiation, a murīd is instructed by his guide, who must first accept the initiate as his disciple. Throughout the instruction period, the murīd typically experiences waridates like visions and dreams during personal spiritual awrads and exercises. These visions are interpreted by the murshid. A common practice among the early Sufi orders was to grant a khirqa or a robe to the murīd upon the initiation or after he had progressed through a series of increasingly difficult and significant tasks on the path of mystical development until attaining wāṣil stage.

== Practice ==
This practice is not very common now. Murīds often receive books of instruction from murshids and often accompany itinerant murshids on their wanderings. A fundamental practice involves teaching the mûrîd (Arabic: موريد "the disciple") an array of seven "names".

1. The first one consists in repeating lâ ilâha ilal 'llâhu (Arabic: لا إله إلا الله "there is no god except God") between 12,000 and 70,000 times in a day and night. If the mûršîd (Arabic: مُرشِد "the spiritual guide") is satisfied with the mûrîd's progress, then the mûrîd is allowed to continue with the six remaining names:
2. Allâh (Arabic: الله "God") three times;
3. huwa (Arabic: هو "He is"),
4. ḥaqq (Arabic: الحق "The Absolute Truth") three times;
5. ḥayy (Arabic: الحى "The Ever- Living) three times;
6. qayyûm (Arabic: القيوم "The Sustainer, The Self Subsisting") three times;
7. qahhâr (Arabic: القهار "The Ever-Dominating").

== See also ==
- Murīdūn, Andalusī movement that revolted against Almoravid authority in 1144
- Murid War, war between Russia and a Caucasian Naqshbandi movement in the 19th century
- Mouride brotherhood, a prominent Sufi tariqa in West Africa, founded in 1883
- Talibe
- Salik
- Wasil
- Majzoob
- Muqarrab
- Arif
