= John Thompson Platts =

John Thompson Platts (1830–1904), was a British language scholar. His Persian and Urdu grammars were a marked advance upon the work of any English predecessor, and are still in use today.

== Biography ==
Platts was born in Calcutta, India, on 1 August 1830, the second son of Robert Platts of Calcutta, who died young leaving behind a large family and a widow in difficult circumstances. After being educated at Bedford School in England, Platts returned to India and, between 1858 and 1859, worked as mathematics master at Benares College and in charge of Saugor School in the Central Provinces. In 1861 he was appointed mathematical professor and headmaster of Benares College. In 1864, Platts became assistant inspector of schools, second circle, Northwest Provinces and, in 1868, he became officiating inspector of schools, northern circle, Central Provinces. He retired in March 1872, owing to ill-health.

Platts then returned to England, and settling in Ealing, occupying himself by teaching Urdu, Hindi and Persian, having mastered the languages. In June 1880, he was elected teacher of Persian language at Oxford University. He matriculated from Balliol College, Oxford in February 1881 and, in June 1881, became Master of Arts honoris causa. In March 1901, he received the degree of Master of Arts by decree. He died suddenly in London on 21 September 1904, and was buried at Wolvercote Cemetery near Oxford.

Platts married twice: first, in 1856, in Lahore, Pakistan, to Alice Jane Kenyon, by whom he had three sons and four daughters; and second, in 1876, to Mary Elizabeth Hayes of Melbourne, Australia. They had one son.

== Published works ==
- A Grammar of the Hindūstānī or Urdū Language (in English and Urdu). London: W. H. Allen & Co. 1874.
- A Hindustani-English Dictionary (1881).
- A Dictionary of Urdu, Classical Hindi, and English (1884).
- A Grammar of the Persian Language, Part I: Accidence (1894).
- He also edited the text of Gulistan of Sa'di (1872), and published Sa'di (Shaikh Muslihuddin Shirazi), photographed from manuscripts under his supervision (1891). He translated the Ikhwanu-s-Safa of Maulavi Ikram Ali (1875), and the Gulistan of Sa'di (1876).
