= Nūr (Islam) =

Metaphysical light in Islamic tradition

Nūr (Arabic: النور) is a term in Islamic context referring to the "cold light of the night" or "heatless light", i.e., the light of the moon. This light is used as a symbol for "God's guidance" and "knowledge", a symbol of mercy in contrast to Nar, which refers to the diurnal solar "hot light", i.e., fire. In the Quran, God is stated to be "the light (Nūr) of the heavens and the earth" (Verse of Light). Many classical commentators on the Quran compare this to God illuminating the world with understanding, not taken literally. The first and foremost to representatively stand to the concept of nūr muḥammadī (the essence of Muhammad) being the quintessence of everything was Sayyid Abdul Qadir Gilani, who described this idea in his book Sirr ul Asrar. This concept was then preached by his disciples. One of Sayyid Abdul Qadir Gilani's disciples was the Andalusian scholar Abu Bakr ibn al-Arabi, who categorized nūr into different levels of understanding from the most profound to the most mundane. Shias believe nūr, in the sense of inner esoteric understanding, is inherited through the Imams, who in turn communicate it to the people.

== In the Quran ==
The word nūr comes from the same root as the Hebrew Ohr, the primal light described in the Book of Genesis that was created at the beginning. In Aramaic the term nūr means fire. In Aramaic, it became associated with igniting candles, shifting the term to the meaning of fire, while in Arabic nūr became light. The word nūr, or its derivatives, occurs forty-nine times in the Quran. It is used in reference to God, Muhammad, the Quran, the Book, the Torah, the moon and the faithful men and women. Al-nur is often used in contrast with zulumat (darkness) in terms that describe movement from darkness into light, and from ignorance into faith. The word nūr is also used in eight basic referential meanings:

1. The religion of Islam
2. Faith
3. God's commandments and moral laws in the Torah and the Gospels
4. The light of day
5. The guiding light that God will give to the faithful on the Day of Resurrection
6. The commandments and injunctions of the Quran
7. Justice
8. The light of the moon

Surah 24 of the Quran contains the Ayat an-Nur, the Verse of Light (Q24:35), which reads, "God is the light of the heavens and the earth; the likeness of His light is as a niche wherein is a lamp (the lamp in a glass, the glass as it were a glittering star) kindled from a Blessed Tree, an olive that is neither of the East nor of the West whose oil well nigh would shine, even if no fire touched it; light upon light; (God guides to His light whom He will.)" The phrase "light upon light" (nurun 'ala nur) in this sura is often used among Muslims to denote the infinite beauty, guidance and light of God.

== Classical commentaries ==
Al-Tabari (839–923) says in his Jami al-bayan that the best interpretation is to substitute "guide" for "light", as "God is the guide of the heavens and the earth". Other interpretations make God the source of illumination rather than the light itself, such as "God lights the heavens and the earth". The Persian scholar Al-Zamakhshari (c. 1074 –1144) says that the phrase "God is the light" is like saying "Zayd is generous and munificent". This does not mean that Zayd is the properties of generosity and munificence, but that he has these properties. Al-Zamakhshari rejected the possibility of attributes separate from God, such as power or knowledge or light, which would be contrary to the unity of God. He interpreted "God is the light of the heavens and the earth" as meaning,

He is the possessor of the light of the heavens and the owner of the light of the heavens. The light of the heavens and the earth is the truth (al-ḥaqq), which can be compared to light in its manifestation and clarification, just as he says, "God is the friend of those who believe; He brings them forth from the shadows to the light (2:257), i.e., from the false to the true (al-ḥaqq).

Al-Ghazali (c. 1058–1111) wrote a treatise on how different types of light should be defined, and how the phrase "God is the light of the heavens and the earth" should be interpreted. In his view, "light" can have three different meanings. The first is the ordinary usage, "an expression of what can be seen in itself and through which other things can be seen, like the sun". In Arabic the word light may also refer to the eye, through which perception takes place, and this may be a more appropriate interpretation. The "eye" of the intellect is an even more perfect organ of perception, and "light" may refer to this organ. In this sense "light" may refer to Muhammad, and to a lesser extent to the other prophets and religious scholars. A third interpretation is that "light" is the first light (al-nūr al-awwal) and the real light (al-nūr al-ḥaqq) since it is the only light that does not take its luminosity from some other source. God is light, the only light, the universal light, and he is hidden from mortals because he is pure light, although he is omnipresent. Using the term "light" for any other purpose is metaphor.

Another passage of the Quran states "The earth will shine with the light of its Lord" (Q39:69). Mainstream exegetes take this statement literally. Exegetes of the rationalist Mu'tazila school of theology of the eighth–tenth centuries interpreted the word nūr in this passage in the sense of "the truth, the Quran and the proof" rather than the commonplace meaning of "light". Shia exegetes take it to mean "the land of the soul will shine with the Lord's light of justice and truth during the time of Imam al-Mahdi." Sufi exegetes take nūr in this case to mean "justice", or take the statement to mean "God will create a special light to shine on the Earth".

== Nizari Isma'ili belief ==
The followers of the Nizari Isma'ili sect believe that divine guidance continues to reach Ismailis through the progeny of Muhammad. The Imams have the function of conveying the inner, esoteric understanding to Ismailis. According to Nadia Eboo Jamal, the Imams are "the inheritors of his spiritual knowledge ('ilm), the bearers of the light (nūr) of God and His living proof (hujjah) on earth."

According to the fifth Shiite Imam, Muhammad al-Baqir, the imams are the muḥaddathūn that are mentioned in the Quran, and are the light of God (nūr Allāh). He was asked to comment on the Quranic verse Q64:8, "And believe in Allah and His Messenger and the nūr (light) that We have brought down." He replied that the imams from the Prophet's family were in fact the light of God (nūr Allah) in the heavens and on earth. This spiritual light, passed down from one generation to the next, symbolizes the eternal knowledge that Muhammad passed on to Ali and his descendants.

There seem to be two concepts. The nūr muḥammadī, a light from the side of Adam that is passed down from Prophet to Prophet until Mohammad and then through genealogical descent, while the nūr Allah is inherited at the time the previous possessor dies. The imam has the nūr muḥammadī at birth, but is silent until he receives the nūr Allah. The nūr muḥammadī is the symbol of succession and the substance that connects Adam to Muhammad and Muhammad to the imams. The nūr Allah is the symbol of inspiration and prophecy, which the imams share with the prophets and all men chosen by God.

== Nūr Muḥammadī as a theological doctrine ==
The concept of nūr muḥammadī (نور محمدي, the Muhammadan Light) refers to the doctrine that before the creation of the physical world, Allah created a primordial divine light from which the Prophet Muhammad and, in Twelver Shia theology, the Imams of his household were subsequently formed. As a theological doctrine, it has been developed across both Shia and Sufi traditions, though with distinct emphases and implications in each.

The doctrine has been traced by scholars to its earliest systematic articulation in the teachings of Imam Ja'far al-Sadiq (d. 148/765), the sixth Imam of Twelver Shia Islam, and underwent significant elaboration through Shia and Sufi thinkers across subsequent centuries. Academic research has identified three broad phases in its conceptual development: an early mytho-cosmological phase in which the light is described as the first spiritual creation; a Neoplatonized phase in which it is understood through frameworks of emanation; and a later ontological phase in which the light is treated as the self-manifestation of God.

A narration widely cited in connection with this doctrine is attributed to the companion Jabir ibn 'Abd Allah, in which the Prophet is reported to have said: "O Jabir, the first thing Allah created was the light of your Prophet from His light." The narration is attributed in several classical works, including al-Qastallani's al-Mawahib al-Ladunniyyah, to 'Abd al-Razzaq (d. 211/827), the prominent hadith scholar and teacher of Bukhari. Classical scholars including Alusi in Ruh al-Ma'ani and 'Abd al-Haqq al-Dihlawi accepted the narration's grounding, while others including al-Suyuti and several later hadith critics questioned its chain of transmission. The scholarly debate over the narration's status has not prevented the theological concept it expresses from becoming foundational in both Sufi and Shia cosmological thought.

=== In Twelver Shia theology ===
In Twelver Shia Islam, the doctrine of nūr muḥammadī has a specific and foundational theological function that distinguishes it from its Sufi parallels. Shia theology holds that the primordial light was not exclusive to Muhammad but was shared by the Imams of his household, who participated in the same pre-eternal spiritual reality before the creation of the physical world. Narrations in al-Kafi and Bihar al-Anwar describe Muhammad and the Imams as having existed as lights (anwār) under the divine throne before the creation of Adam.

This doctrine is directly connected to the Twelver concept of the Imamate and the doctrine of ismah (infallibility). Shia theologians argue that the unique ontological station of the Imams — their pre-eternal participation in the nūr muḥammadī — is the theological basis for their infallibility and their divinely conferred authority to guide the community and interpret divine law. The Ahl al-Kisa, described as purified of sin in the verse of purification (Q33:33), are understood in this framework as the earthly manifestation of the primordial light, rendering their guidance both necessary and uniquely authoritative.

The Twelver tradition also draws a distinction between nūr muḥammadī and nūr Allāh (the light of God). According to narrations attributed to Imam Muhammad al-Baqir, the fifth Imam, the nūr muḥammadī is the light of prophetic succession passed genealogically from Adam through the prophets to Muhammad and then to the Imams, while the nūr Allāh is the light of divine inspiration and guidance that an Imam receives upon the death of his predecessor. An Imam possesses the nūr muḥammadī from birth but does not exercise his full authority until he receives the nūr Allāh. This two-fold conception of light underpins the Shia understanding of how the Imamate is simultaneously hereditary and divinely conferred.

A further narration known in classical sources as Hadīth al-Nūr (حديث النور) extends the doctrine explicitly to Ali ibn Abī Ṭālib. In this narration, attributed to the Prophet, he states: "I and Ali ibn Abi Talib both were a light in the presence of Allah fourteen thousand years before the creation of Adam. When Allah created Adam, He deposited this light in Adam's loins. We remained together as one light until we were separated in 'Abd al-Muttalib's loin. Thereafter, I was endowed with Prophethood and Ali with Caliphate." The narration is documented in numerous classical works including the Musnad of Ahmad ibn Hanbal, the Manaqib of Ibn al-Maghazili al-Shafi'i, Faraid al-Simtain of Ibrahim al-Hamweeni al-Shafi'i, and Yanabi al-Mawaddah of Sulayman al-Qundozi, among others. In Twelver Shia theology, this narration provides the direct textual grounding for the doctrine that the Imams share in the prophetic light, and thus in the spiritual authority and ontological station that the nūr muḥammadī confers — with the distinction that Muhammad bears prophethood (nubuwwa) and Ali and his descendants bear the Imamate (wilāya), marking a clear difference in Muhammad's status as a Prophet and his successors' status of Imamate, but maintaining the concept of purity or 'divine light'.

=== In broader Islamic thought ===
In Sufi tradition, the nūr muḥammadī was elaborated by Ibn Arabi (d. 638/1240) through the related concept of al-Haqiqa al-Muhammadiyya (the Muhammadan Reality), which he described as the first entity brought into existence — the primordial manifestation of the divine names through which the cosmos came into being. For Ibn Arabi, the Muhammadan Reality was not restricted to the historical person of Muhammad but represented a universal spiritual principle, the archetype of the perfect human being through whom God's attributes are most completely expressed.

=== Sunni and Salafi positions ===
The concept of nūr muḥammadī as a cosmological doctrine has been accepted within mainstream traditional Sunni scholarship, particularly among Sufi-influenced Hanafi, Maliki, and Shafi'i scholars. However, the doctrine has been contested by Salafi and Wahhabi scholars, who regard the cosmological interpretation of the Prophet as primordial light as an innovation (bid'ah) unsupported by authenticated hadith, and view the veneration of the Prophet's nur as potentially approaching impermissible exaggeration (ghuluww). This division broadly mirrors the wider Salafi rejection of Sufi cosmological doctrines and the classical Sunni tradition's more varied and permissive reception of them.

== Sufi belief ==
To the Sufis, nūr is the first creation of Allah, and all other things and beings were gradually created from it. The Andalusian scholar Abu Bakr ibn al-Arabi (1076–1148) elaborated the concept that Muhammad existed before creation. This is the doctrine of An-Nūr al-Muḥammadī, or the Muhammadan Light. The light existed before creation, and everything was created from it. The world is a manifestation of the light, which was incarnated in Adam, the prophets and the Aqṭāb. Ibn al-Arabi wrote, "The creation began with nūr Muhammad. The lord brought the nūr from his own heart." The Persian poet and Sufi theoretician Fariduddin Attar (c. 1145–1221) wrote, "The origin of the soul is the absolute light, nothing else. That means it was the light of Muhammad, nothing else."

To the Sufis, light also represents what we know about our inner self, and darkness what we do not know. Ibn Arabi distinguished three types of light: Nûr al-anwâr (The Light of lights), which reveals the absolute reality in its most transcendent aspect, anwâr al-ma'âni (The Light of the intellect) and anwâr al-tabi'â (The Light of nature). The Persian philosopher Shahab al-Din Suhrawardi (1155–91) wrote, "Allah's essence is the original creative Light, always illuminating existence. It constantly manifests the universe and energizes it. Allah's Essential Light radiates the whole cosmos in abundant beauty and completeness. To be illuminated by this process means nothing less than salvation."

Muḥammad ibn Muṣṭafá Khādimī (c. 1702–1763) writes that, "protecting the spiritual heart from worldly thoughts can be accomplished by the spiritual heart's benefiting (receiving "Fayd" (nūr [light]) from the spiritual heart of the perfect Sufi master. The spiritual luminance (Fayd) flows from one spiritual heart to another by way of love. Death of the perfect spiritual guide or his being in a distant country does not stop the flow of spiritual luminance (Fayd)." According to Inayat Khan (1882–1927) the soul is like a ray of the sun. The angels, who do not have physical bodies, are made of nūr, or light, that comes from the divine Sun, the Spirit of God. All souls are made of Nur, or contain some part of that essence, which is the essence of the whole manifestation.

== Medieval Bengal ==
Hans Harder writes that in medieval Bengali Sufi cosmology the nūr muḥammad is personified. The nūr, created by the lord, in turn brought the world into existence from drops of perspiration (gharma, ghām) that appeared in different parts of his body. He says the concept is common in Maizbhandari writings, often used to describe the saints or their sensual qualities. Gholan Morshed wrote an article that identified nūr with Muhammad. In his Islāmī prabandha sambhār he wrote that nūr-i muḥammadī is the moving force behind all creation, and should not be seen as separate from Muhammad. He wrote,

At the background [antāral] of the creation, His [Muhammad's] nūr, the nūr-i muḥammadī, is at play [līlārta] as the life-breath of the creation. This is the highest secret of the play of creation, full of science [bijňān'may]. Therefore, Muhammad is not any special person, not confined to any specific country, race [jāti] or by any border. In the form of nūr-i muḥammadī, He is qualified [guņānvita] by the same quality as Allah.

Lutfunnesa Hosaini wrote a treatise Tāohīd, part of which discusses the creation of the world from the time when nūr-i muḥammadī emerged to the time when Muhammad was born. She writes that the nūr-i muḥammadī was divided into four parts. From the first three emerged the pen, the book of destinies and the throne. The fourth part was divided into four. From the first three emerged the angels that held the throne, the seat of the throne, and all of the other angels. The last part gave rise to the sky, the earth, heaven and hell, and to a part that then gave the light of the eyes of the believers, the light of their hearts, the light of the tawḥīd and the kalima.

Lutfunnesa Hosaini gives another account with reference to a Quranic commentary named Tafsīr-i rūḥ al-kitāb. In this version nūr-i muḥammadī was also used to create the nūr of Adam, stored on his back. The angels gathered behind Adam to see the light. Adam asked the Lord to put the light on his forehead, and the angels came round to where he could see them. Adam wanted to see the light himself, and the Lord transferred it to his index finger. When Adam came down to earth, lights entered his back again, and the nūr was then passed from Adam through the backs of various men and the wombs of women down to the parents of Muhammad.

== Modern Turkey ==
Said Nursî founded the Nur movement in Turkey, stressing patience and spiritual withdrawal after the secularization program of the 1930s and 1940s had crushed revolt. The adherents of the Nur movement and the Sufi orders in general consider that societal change will be enabled if individuals are redeemed. Negative feelings such as anger and shame should be controlled through inner mobilization. Said Nursî's textually-based Nurcu movement evolved from the Sufi orders. According to the Nurcu leader Mehmet Kırkıncı, "the sun of Islam set down in 1925 and dawned in 1950 with the writings of Said, which enlighten the darkness of Kemalism with its light [nur]."

== See also ==
- Yaqeen
- Baqaa
- The five lights – a similar concept
- World of Light – world where the Mandaean God and the angels dwell

== Sources ==
- Abdul-Raof, Hussein (2012). Theological Approaches to Qur'anic Exegesis: A Practical Comparative-contrastive Analysis. Routledge. ISBN 978-0-415-44958-8.
- Alibhai, Fayaz S. (2002). "Surviving the Mongols: Nizari Quhistani and the Continuity of Ismaili Tradition in Persia – A Reading Guide" (PDF). The Institute of Ismaili Studies. Archived from the original (PDF) on 2013-05-14.
- Dehlvi, Sadia (2012-09-05). Sufism: Heart of Islam. HarperCollins Publishers. ISBN 978-93-5029-448-2.
- Douglas-Klotz, Neil (2005). The Sufi Book of Life: 99 Pathways of the Heart for the Modern Dervish. Penguin Compass. ISBN 978-0-14-219635-9.
- Fatani, Afnan H. (2006). "NUR". The Qur'an: An Encyclopedia. Taylor & Francis. ISBN 978-0-415-32639-1.
- Harder, Hans (2011-03-08). Sufism and Saint Veneration in Contemporary Bangladesh: The Maijbhandaris of Chittagong. Routledge. ISBN 978-1-136-83189-8.
- Irwin, Robert (2011-04-14). Memoirs of a Dervish: Sufis, Mystics and the Sixties. Profile Books. ISBN 978-1-84765-404-5.
- Khādimī, Muḥammad (2005). Ethics of Islam. Hakikat Kitapevi. ISBN 978-1-4657-9821-3. GGKEY:3HXN4S2CKUF.
- Khan, Hazrat Inayat (2013-07-02). The Heart of Sufism: Essential Writings of Hazrat Inayat Khan. Shambhala Publications. ISBN 978-0-8348-2874-2.
- Lalani, Arzina R. (2000). Early Shi'i Thought: The Teachings of Imam Muhammad Al-Baqir. I.B.Tauris. ISBN 978-1-86064-434-4.
- Sands, Kristin (2006-07-13). Sufi Commentaries on the Qur'an in Classical Islam. Routledge. ISBN 978-1-134-21144-9.
- Trimingham, J. Spencer (1998-05-19). The Sufi Orders in Islam. Oxford University Press, USA. ISBN 978-0-19-802823-9.
- Yahya, Osman (1991). "Theophanies and Lights in the Thought of Ibn 'Arabi". Journal of the Muhyiddin Ibn 'Arabi Society. 10.
- Yavuz, Hakan (2003-07-31). Islamic Political Identity in Turkey. Oxford University Press, USA. ISBN 978-0-19-534770-8.
