= Salik =

Term for a follower of Sufism

A sālik is a follower of Sufism, from the verb salaka which means to travel or follow, related to sulūk "pathway". Sulūk here specifically refers to a spiritual path, i.e. the combination of the two "paths" that can be followed in religion, the exoteric path or shariah, and the esoteric path or haqiqa. The "path" metaphor is derived from the Qur'an: see sura 16, (An-Nahl, The Bees), ayat 69:

faslukī subula rabbiki dhululan "and follow the ways of your Lord made easy [for you]", which uses the imperative of the verb salaka which means to follow or to travel.

A sālik is also called murid when one becomes a disciple to one particular spiritual teacher (murshid) or a Sufi master.

== See also ==
- Tariqa
- Talibe
- Murid
- Wasil
- Majzoob
- Muqarrab
- Arif
