= Kashf =

Islamic and Sufi concept

Kashf (Arabic: كشف, lit. 'unveiling') is a Sufi concept dealing with knowledge of the heart rather than of the intellect. Kashf describes the state of experiencing a personal divine revelation after ascending through spiritual struggles, and uncovering the heart (a spiritual faculty) in order to allow divine truths to pour into it. Kashf is etymologically related to mukashafa "disclosure"/ "divine irradiation of the essence", which connotes "gain[ing] familiarity with things unseen behind the veils". For those who have purified their hearts, and who come to know the Divine Names and Attributes to the fullest of their individual capacities, the veils in front of the purely spiritual realms are opened slightly, and they begin to gain familiarity with the unseen. In Sufism, an even further revelatory capacity exists by which the Divine mysteries become readily apparent to the seeker through the light of knowledge of God. This is called tajalli "manifestation".

== Veil references in Islamic literature ==
Two passages in the Qur'an serve as a basis for elaboration on the Sufi concept of kashf:

- [50.22] ‘Thou wast heedless of this; therefore We have now removed from thee thy covering [veil], and so thy sight today is piercing.’
- [53.57-58] The Imminent is imminent; apart from God none can disclose [remove] it.

The verb "kashafa," but never the noun "kashf" occurs in the Qur'an a variety of times in the sense of either "to uncover" (a part of the body) or "to take away" (misfortune, danger).

=== Hadith of the Veils ===
One hadith holds particular significance for the concept of kashf:

إن بين الله عز وجل وبين الخلق سبعين ألف حجاب وأقرب الخلق إلى الله عز وجل جبريل وميكائيل ، وإسرافيل ، وإن بينهم وبينه أربع حجب : حجاب من نار ، وحجاب من ظلمة ، وحجاب من غمام ، وحجاب من الماء.

Between God, mighty and sublime, and creation are 70,000 veils. The nearest of creatures to God, mighty and sublime, are Gabriel, Michael, and Raphael, and between them and Him are four veils: a veil of fire, a veil of darkness, a veil of cloud, and a veil of water.

This Hadith is quoted somewhat differently by Ibn Majah as follows:

God has seventy thousand veils of light and darkness; if He were to remove them, the radiant splendors of His Face would burn up whoever (or ‘whatever creature’) was reached by His Gaze.

It is said that Muhammad's cousin Ali ibn Abi Talib prayed:

My Lord, grant me complete severance of my relations with everything else and total submission to You. Enlighten the eyes of our hearts with the light of their looking at You to the extent that they penetrate the veils of light and reach the Source of Grandeur, and let our souls get suspended by the glory of Your sanctity.

== Sufi scholars on Kashf ==
Al-Qushayri expands on al-Kalabadhi’s proposal that tajalli (manifestation) of "the essence" of the Divine is called mukashafa. He then illustrates three stages in progression towards understanding the Real:

1. Muhadara—getting oneself into position vis-à-vis the objective sought. The objective remains veiled at this stage. This stage presupposes the presence of the heart, but relies on transmission of proof through the intellect (i.e. understanding God through his miraculous signs).
2. Mukashafa—lifting of the veil. Here reasoning (of the intellect) gives way to evident proof (through intuition). One directly encounters the Attributes of God. Yet, this stage is still considered an intermediary stage.
3. Mushahada—direct vision. This stage indicates an immediate encounter with The Real, without the intellect OR the intuition acting as an intermediary. This is direct experience of the Divine Essence.

Al-Ghazali—This Sufi scholar discusses the concept of kashf, not purely in its mystical sense, but also with respect to theology in general. In conjunction with Al-Kushayri, Al-Ghazali links kashf with intuition. For Al-Ghazali, mukashafa has a dual sense:

1. It indicates an inner state of purification, which is subjective and brought about by "unveiling" or kashf.
2. It describes the objective truths that are revealed through the "unveiling"/kashf.

Since, for Al-Ghazali, kashf is linked to intuition, he describes mukashafa as the certain knowledge of the unseen discovered by the "science of the saints". Thus, kashf is considered "a light" that is freely bestowed upon the purified worshipper through the grace of God, yet also yields sure intuitive knowledge for the worshipper upon whom it is bestowed.

Ibn Arabi—This Sufi mystic indicates the necessity for "divine unveiling" (kashf) as the means by which to understand the universality of the reality of realities (i.e., the universality of God's oneness). In fana (self-annihilation), the individual ego passes away and divine self-manifestation occurs. This self-manifestation is eternal (as it comes from God), but it must be continually reenacted by the human in time. Therefore, the human becomes a pure receptor required for pure consciousness to be realized. The human is a sort of barzakh or intermediary between divinity and elementality, between spirit and matter, and open to the experience of kashf.

Ali Hujwiri—The author of the Persian Sufi text Kashf ul Mahjoob (Revelation of the Veiled) Hujwiri argues, along with Al-Kushayri that few real Sufis exist anymore in his time; rather, there are a large number of "false pretenders" which he calls mustaswif—"the would-be Sufi". In his text, Hujwiri describes the "veils which should be lifted" in order to purify one's heart and really pursue Sufism. Hujwiri argues for the importance of "morals" over "formal practice" in Sufism. He was the first to directly address the problematic diversity in Muslim belief during his time. In Kashf ul Mahjoob, he describes various Sufi approaches to theoretical ideas, linking them to particular key Sufi figures.

== Kashf and Shia Islam ==
In Shia Islam, the spiritual experience of kashf is treated as a theological rather than purely mystical dimension.

Imamis—Sayyid Haydar Amuli distinguishes three kinds of knowledge: 1) by the intellect, 2) by transmission, 3) by kashf—this is the only form of knowledge that leads to true understanding of Reality
Amuli additionally distinguishes between two kinds of kashf:

1. kashf suwari—divine manifestations reach the senses of sight and hearing
2. kashf ma’nawi—spiritual encounter, such as the disclosure indicated by mukashafa

Ismalis—these followers of Shi’ism put emphasis on kashf in a double sense as both a Gnostic and cosmic "state." The Ismailis define "cycles of metahistory" which alternate between phases of "unveiling" (dawr al-kashf) and "occultation" (dawr al-satr).

== Controversy in the Muslim world ==
The concept of kashf remains controversial in the Muslim world because it indicates the ability to "know" the unknowable. According to the Qur'an, Muslims are required to believe in the unseen (namely Allah), but knowledge of the unseen is a power that belongs solely to God, though God may reveal some of this knowledge to those He is pleased with, such as in Surah al-Kahf (79-83), which describes Khidr possessing divine knowledge that he used to carry out the will of Allah.

Muslims who theologically disagree with Sufism believe that any kashf Sufis obtain is not given to them by Allah, since they do not believe Sufis are true followers of the Quran and Islam.

Sufis believe that "the only guide to God is God Himself" and therefore, the only true kashf is kashf that is corroborated by the Quran and the Sunnah. They also believe that every genuine worshipper has the capability to experience unveiling (personal revelation), but that this personal revelation occurs by the grace of God. Some say, if a worshipper fails to experience unveiling, "it indicates that that person is pursuing Sufism for a reason other than the love of God alone." Ibn ‘Arabi calls this "inner receptivity" to the manifestation (tajalli) of the divine mysteries, the essence of which is mukashafa.

== Peripatetic scholars vs. Sufis ==
Peripatetic scholars such as Avicenna, al-Kindi, and al-Farabi argue that the intellect unaided by divine unveiling (kashf) is sufficient in order for man to attain ultimate truth.

Sufis such as Bayazid Bastami, Rumi, and Ibn al-Arabi, hold that the limited human intellect is insufficient and misleading as a means of understanding ultimate truth. This kind of understanding requires intimate, direct knowledge resulting from the removal of the veils separating man from God as given to man by God himself. This is kashf.

== Other types of Kashf ==
The 18th century mystic Khwaja Mir Dard (died 1785) (relying upon the traditional terminology, classified the revelations as follows in his `Ilm al-Kitab:

- Kashf kaunī, revelation on the plane of the created things, is a result of pious actions and purifications of the lower soul; it becomes manifest in dreams and clairvoyance.
- Kashf ilāhī, divine revelation, is a fruit of constant worship and polishing of the heart; it results in the knowledge of the world of spirits and in cardiognosis ["soul-reading"] so that the mystic sees hidden things and reads hidden thoughts.
- Kashf aqlī, revelation by reason, is essentially the lowest grade of intuitive knowledge; it can be attained by polishing the moral faculties, and can be experienced by the philosophers as well.
- Kashf īmānī, revelation through faith, is the fruit of perfect faith after man has acquired proximity to the perfections of prophethood. He will be blessed by direct divine addresses — he talks with the angels, meets the spirits of the prophets, and sees the Night of Might and the blessings of the month of Ramaḍan in human form in the ālam almithāl.
