= Ibadah =

Adoration in Islam

Ibadah (Arabic: عبادة, romanized: ibādah; IPA: [ʕi.baː.da], also spelled ibada) is an Arabic word meaning service or servitude. In Islam, ibadah is usually translated as “worship”, and ibadat—the plural of ibadah—refers to Islamic jurisprudence (fiqh) of Muslim religious rituals.

== Ibadah ==
In Arabic ibadah is connected with related words such as ubudiyyah (“slavery”), and has connotations of obedience, submission, and humility. The word linguistically means "obedience with submission".

In Islam, ibadah is usually translated as “worship” and means obedience, submission, and devotion to God.

Other sources (noted Islamist author Abul A'la Maududi and others) give a broader definition of ibadah, including keeping speech free “from filth, falsehood, malice, abuse”, and dishonesty, obeying Shariah law in “commercial and economic affairs” and in “dealings with your parents, relatives, friends”, and everyone else.

== Ibadat ==
Ibadat (عبادات) is the plural form of ibādah. In addition to meaning more than one ibādah, it refers to Islamic jurisprudence (fiqh) on “the rules governing worship in Islam” or the “religious duties of worship incumbent on all Muslims when they come of age and are of sound body and mind.” It is distinguished from other fields of jurisprudence in Islam, which are usually known as muʿāmalāt (interpersonal transactions).

Ibadat include what are known as the "pillars of Islam":

- Declaration of faith (Shahada), which may be translated as “There is no god but God and Muhammad is the Messenger of God”;
- Ritual prayer (Salat), observed five times every day at prescribed times, with prescribed preparations (ritual cleansing), prescribed movements (standing, bowing, prostrating, sitting) and prescribed verses, phrases;
- Almsgiving (Zakat), customarily 2.5% of a Muslim’s total savings and wealth above a minimum amount known as nisab, which is based on income and the value of all of one’s possessions;
- Fasting (Sawm), refraining from eating, drinking, and sexual relations during daylight hours—especially during the Islamic holy month of Ramadan;
- Pilgrimage to Mecca (Hajj)—the annual Islamic pilgrimage to the holiest city of Islam, a mandatory religious duty for Muslims, who must do it at least once in their lifetime, if they are adults who are physically and financially capable of the journey, and can support their family during their absence.

According to Oxford Islamic Studies, “because they are of central importance to the Muslim community, the ibadat form the first subject matter of Islamic jurisprudence and most collections of prophetic traditions (hadith).” The subject of ibadat is especially important in Islam, according to author Faleel Jamaldeen, because without these religious laws, “Muslims would likely create their own rituals and prayers, and the religion of Islam would falter and eventually disappear.”

== See also ==
- Schools of Islamic theology
