= Hidayah =

Arabic word meaning "guidance"

Hidāyah (Arabic: هداية, Hidaayah IPA: [hɪdaːja]) is an Arabic word meaning "guidance". According to Islamic belief, guidance has been provided by God to humans primarily in the form of the Qur'an. Not only through the Quran, but Hidayah, or guidance, is also provided through Muhammad and how he lived his life, which is known as the Sunnah of the Prophet. Through his teachings and the guidelines in the Quran, Muslims hope to attain a better lifestyle.

== See also ==
- Fatwa
- Fiqh
- Islamic advice literature
- Khutbah
- Nasîhat
- Tafsir
