= Tajalli =

Islamic and Sufi concept

Tajalli (Arabic: تَجَلِّي, romanized: tajallī, lit. 'manifestation') is the appearance and disclosure of God as truth in Sufism. Tajalli is believed to be a process by which God manifests himself in concrete forms.

== Meaning ==
Tajalli literally means "manifestation", "revelation", "disclosure" or "epiphany / theophany". Mystics use the term to refer to the manifestation of divine truth in the microcosm of the human heart and the macrocosm of the universe, interrelated in God's creation and constituting a reflection of the majesty of his Tawhid or indivisible oneness. The concept is used five times in the Quran, including in the following verse:

When Musa [Moses] arrived at our appointed time and his Lord spoke to him, he said: "O Lord, reveal Yourself to me that I may behold You." "You cannot behold Me," He said. "But look at the mountain: If it remains firm in its place you may then behold Me." But when his Lord appeared on the mountain, making it crumble to a heap of dust, Musa fell unconscious. When he recovered, he said: "All glory to You. I turn to You in repentance, and I am the first to believe." (7. Al-Araf: 143)

== Tajalli in theological commentaries ==
Theologians interpreting the Quran understand tajalli as appearance. They emphasize the concept of seeing God (Arabic: رؤيا, romanized: ruʾyā). Ash'ari Sunnis use the Quranic concept to argue for the possibility of seeing God. To the contrary, the Muta'zila Sunni and the Shia interpret this verse to prove the impossibility of seeing God.

== Tajalli in mysticism ==
Divine self-manifestation has an important role in epistemology and ontology for mystics. Two concepts are important to Tajalli; one is shams, the sun of truth, and the other is the mirror of the heart. According to the symbolical language of mysticism, the sun is a password of Truth and the mirror is the key to the universe and the heart.

=== Epistemological meaning ===
According to epistemological semantics, truth manifests itself in the heart of the human being on a mystical journey. Consequently, by means of divine manifestation within one's self, the mystic could attain to a realization of the truth to such a degree that those attributes he personally embodies shine forth as reflections of the divine attributes within his very being. The spiritual wayfarer discovers this through the ascetic or Sufi conduct during his spiritual journey inward to attain to God Consciousness, which he unleashes within himself into the world as a kind of divine charisma. Some mystics of the Sufi path recognize this charisma as a divine presence and regard it as sufficient reason to conclude that the Divine is manifest in the heart of the charismatic. Alternatively, Tajalli is also used to denote a removal of the conceptual veils which hide the truth of the Divine Manifestation - namely every thing that veils creation's true end, which is to act as a revelation of God's divine attributes.

==== Hierarchy of manifestation ====
Mystics have many levels to achieve intuitive knowledge of God:

1. The level of muhazarah or the place of self-effacement or "Mahv". This level is also called a place of manifestation of conducts of God.
2. The level of revealing or the place of "Tams". The level is the manifestation of God's attributes.
3. The level of revealing the essence of God unto ascetic's heart. This stage is also called Mahq.

=== Ontological meaning ===
According to ontological sense, the absolute truth manifests itself in the universe like the appearing of the sun of truth in the mirror of the universe in the heart of the mystic. The absolute manifests itself in multitude forms in different beings.

== See also ==
- Emanationism
- Kashf

== Sources ==
- Asghar Dadbeh, ed. (1988). "Tajalli". Great Encyclopedia of Islam. Vol. 14. pp. 587–591. ISBN 978-9647025546. {1367 of the Solar Hijri Calendar)
- Toshihiko Izutsu, Sufism and Taoism: A Comparative Study of Key Philosophical Concepts, University of California Press, 1984, ISBN 9780520052642
