= Qalb =

Center of the human personality in Islam

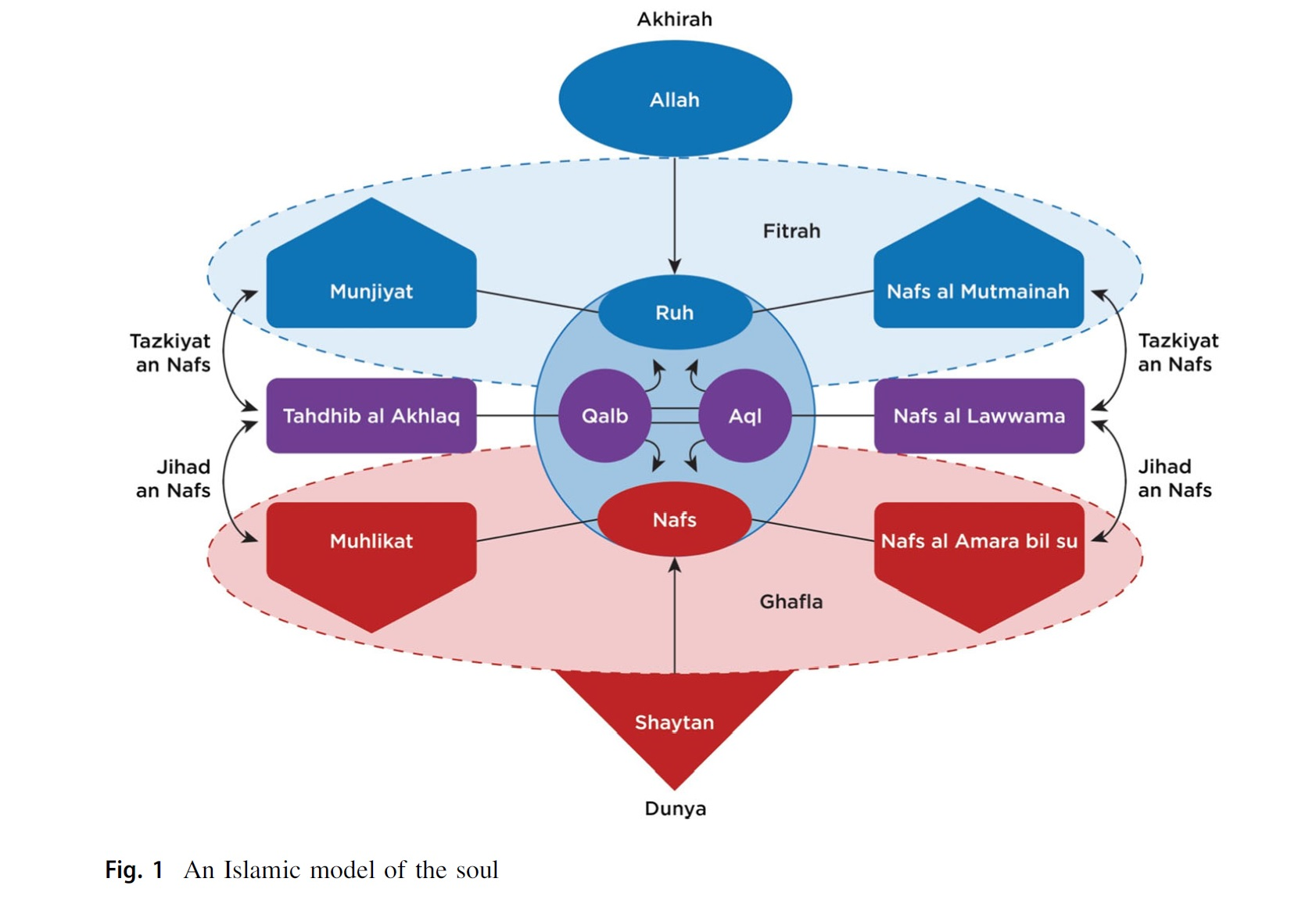
A visual rendition of the Islamic model of the soul showing the position of "'qalb" relative to other concepts based on a consensus of 18 surveyed academic and religious experts.

In Islamic philosophy, the qalb (Arabic: قلب) or heart is the center of the human personality. The Quran mentions "qalb" 132 times and its root meaning suggests that the heart is always in a state of motion and transformation. According to the Quran and the traditions of Muhammad, the heart plays a central role in human existence, serving as the source of good and evil, right and wrong. In Islam, God is more concerned with the motives of one's heart than their actions. The heart is also a medium for God's revelations to human beings, and is associated with virtues such as knowledge, faith, purity, piety, love, and repentance. Without purification, however, the heart can become plagued with negative attributes such as sickness, sinfulness, evil, and hate.

Theologically, the heart is regarded as the barzakh or isthmus between this world and the next, and between the visible and invisible worlds, the human realm, and the realm of the Spirit.

== In the Quran ==
The Quran frequently employs the term "qalb" (heart), which appears 132 times, and at times substitutes it with similar terms. The word's root meaning denotes concepts of change, transformation, and fluctuation, implying that the heart is constantly in motion and may undergo reversal or alteration. The Quran uses the term "heart" in various ways that highlight its central role in human existence. These diverse uses of the word imply that its original meaning - involving ideas of turning, changing, and overturning - remains relevant, as the heart is regarded as the source of good and evil, right and wrong. The Quran teaches that both believers and non-believers possess hearts. In general, the Quran portrays the heart "as the locus of that which makes a human being human, the center of the human personality". This importance of the heart is due to the profound relationship between humans and God, with the heart being the point of convergence where they can meet God. This interaction is multidimensional, encompassing both cognitive and moral dimensions.

God pays special attention to the heart, as it is viewed as the true center of a person. Quranic verses highlight that God is more concerned with the motives of one's heart than their actions. While mistakes can be forgiven, the intentions of the heart are critical. For example, in 33:5 the Quran states: "There is no fault in you if you make mistakes, but only in what your hearts premeditate". In 2:225, it says: "God will not take you to task for a slip in your oaths; but He will take you to task for what your hearts have earned; and God is Forgiving, Clement" (cf. 2:118, 8:70).

According to the Quran, the heart serves as a medium for God's revelations to human beings. Prophets receive revelations in their hearts, and it is also a place for vision, understanding, and remembrance. The heart plays a crucial role in fostering faith and directing guidance towards the right path. However, it can also serve as a breeding ground for doubt, denial, unbelief, and misguidance, which Satan may try to instill. The heart is associated with virtues such as purity, piety, love, and repentance, but these virtues are not inherent and must be instilled and nurtured by God. Without God's purification, the heart can become plagued with negative attributes such as sickness, sinfulness, evil, and hate. The heart is meant to be open and receptive to the divine guidance, light, and love. However, the hearts of those who do wrong can become hard and harsh. The Quran teaches that God has sent down a beautiful scripture, and those who fear Him tremble when they read it, causing their skin and hearts to soften. However, if the heart is not receptive, it can become hard like stone, or even harder, as the hearts of some have become.

== In prophetic tradition ==
Muhammad frequently used supplications, where he called upon God as the one who makes hearts fluctuate or turn about. He described the heart as being like a feather in the desert, blown by the wind to and fro. One of his wives reported that he used to pray for his heart to be fixed in God's religion, and when she asked him about it, he explained that every person's heart lies between two fingers of God and that He can make it go straight or swerve as He wishes.

The Prophet (peace and blessings of Allah be upon him) said, A Muslim is the brother of another Muslim. He will not oppress him. Don't look down on him. Taqwa resides here (Qalb). With this he pointed three times towards his chest. It is enough for a man to be evil that he despises his Muslim brother. It is forbidden for every Muslim to take one another's blood, his wealth and his honor.

— (Muslim h 32-[2564])

== Theological aspects ==
In Islamic thought, the heart is considered the core of human being, encompassing not only physical and emotional aspects but also intellectual and spiritual aspects. It serves as a connection between individuals and the larger, transcendent realms of existence. According to Seyyed Hossein Nasr, modern society rejects the importance of heart-knowledge because it fails to recognize the existence of individuals beyond their individualistic levels of being.

The heart is not a center of our being; it is the supreme center, its uniqueness resulting from the metaphysical principle that for any specific realm of manifestation there must exist a principle of unity. The heart is the barzakh or isthmus between this world and the next, between the visible and invisible worlds, between the human realm and the realm of the Spirit, between the horizontal and vertical dimensions of existence.

— William Chittick, The Essential Seyyed Hossein Nasr, 2007

== See also ==
- Lataif-e-sitta
- Nafs
- Ruh
- Sufism

== Sources ==
- Murata, S. (1992). "The Heart". The Tao of Islam: A Sourcebook on Gender Relationships in Islamic Thought. State University of New York Press. ISBN 978-0-7914-0913-8.
- Nasr, S.H.; Chittick, W.C. (2007). The Essential Seyyed Hossein Nasr. Library of perennial philosophy The perennial philosophy series. World Wisdom. ISBN 978-1-933316-38-3.
- Rothman, Abdallah; Coyle, Adrian (2018). "Toward a Framework for Islamic Psychology and Psychotherapy: An Islamic Model of the Soul". Journal of Religion and Health. 57 (5). Springer Science and Business Media LLC: 1731–44. doi:10.1007/s10943-018-0651-x. ISSN 0022-4197. PMC 6132620. PMID 29907906.
