= Haqiqa =

One of "the four stages" in Sufism

Haqiqa (Arabic حقيقة ḥaqīqa "truth") is one of "the four stages" in Sufism, shari'a (exoteric path), tariqa (esoteric path), marifa (final mystical knowledge, unio mystica), haqiqa (mystical truth).

== The four stages ==
=== Shariat ===
Shari'a is Islamic law or Islamic jurisprudence as revealed in the Quran and sunna. The first step in Sufism is following every aspect of the law perfectly. The purpose of this is to prove their love for God, by rigorous self-discipline and constant attention to their conduct. When the Sufi fully lives their life according to the shari'a he or she is ready to progress to the second stage. This conformity to earthly rules is important because it recognizes that the spirit of a man or woman is affected by the actions of the body. In this way, bringing the body under the will of God also purifies the spirit and a pure spirit is essential for the second step.

=== Tariqat ===
Tariqa in Arabic means path and it denotes a Sufi brotherhood or chain or order. The orders are governed by shaykhs, spiritual leaders that mentor Sufis. Shaykhs are identified by the signs of God's grace that are evident, such as the ability to perform miracles. They take on people, usually male, that are committed to the Sufi lifestyle and want to progress further in their spiritual education. It is common for the shaykh to test a new disciple by ignoring them, assigning humiliating tasks or being rude to them. When the disciple has passed these tests, he is introduced to the awrad, a series of prayers particular to that order. These prayers must be studied before they are recited, because mistakes made in the prayer are sins. When the disciple has studied and recited the awrad for an indeterminate amount of time, he is expected to experience visions and revelation from God. Sufis believe that at this point the disciple is able to see spiritual things that are veiled from most people.

=== Marifat ===
Marifat (Arabic: المعرفة), is knowledge acquired through experience. It is a term used by Sufi Muslims to describe individual knowledge of spiritual truth (haqiqah) having lived through experiences.

=== Haqiqa ===
Haqiqa is a difficult concept to translate. The book Islamic Philosophical Theology defines it as "what is real, genuine, authentic, what is true in and of itself by dint of metaphysical or cosmic status", which is a valid definition but one that does not explain haqiqa's role in Sufism. Haqiqa may be best defined as the knowledge that comes from communion with God, knowledge gained only after the tariqa is undertaken. For instance, a shaykh that has advanced through tariqa has haqiqa and can see into the lives of his disciples in a spiritual sense. He has knowledge of pregnancies and sicknesses before his disciples tell him. He can see beyond the physical world because of his proximity to God and possession of haqiqa. Haqiqa is less a stage in itself and more the marker of a higher level of consciousness, which precedes the next and final stage, marifa.

== In Yazidism ==
Like Sufism, Yazidism also makes use of the concepts of sharia, tariqa, haqiqa, and ma'rifa. In Yazidism, the concept of haqiqa ("[esoteric] truth") stands in contrast to the concept of sharia ("law" or "dogmatic legalism"), the latter which is frowned upon in Yazidi tradition.

== See also ==
- Hikmah
- Hikmat al-Muta'aliyah
- Irfan
- Ma'rifa
- Universality
