= Jawharat al-Tawhid =

Islamic theological work

An Outpouring of Subtleties upon the Pearl of Oneness
- Author: Ibrahim al-Laqqani
- Original title: جوهرة التوحيد
- Translator: Allie Khalfe
- Language: Arabic, English
- Subject: 'Aqida (Islamic creed or faith), Tawhid (Islamic concept of monotheism, oneness of God), and Kalam (Islamic rational or dialectic theology)
- Publisher: Sunni Publications
- Publication date: 2019
- Publication place: Rotterdam, the Netherlands; Cape Town, South Africa
- Pages: 352
- ISBN: 978-9079294312
- OCLC: 1181893113
- Original text: جوهرة التوحيد at Arabic Wikisource

Jawharat al-Tawhid (Arabic: جوهرة التوحيد, lit. 'The Gem of Monotheism') is a popular didactic poem on the Ash'ari creed, consisting of one hundred and forty-four (144) rajaz verses, authored by the Egyptian Maliki scholar Ibrahim al-Laqqani (d. 1041/1631). It is widely read, studied, and memorized in many Islamic educational institutions throughout the entire Islamic world, including al-Azhar. According to Roman Loimeier, this was the basic text in Zanzibar in the late 19th century for advanced students in theology. It is still on the curriculum of Islamic university education in contemporary Daghestan.

== Content ==
Al-Laqqani's Jawharat al-Tawhid is considered his most celebrated and acclaimed work that summarizes the doctrines of the Ash'ari school of theology, a widely accepted rational framework of Sunni Islam that was endorsed in the Maliki school of law, which is dominant among Muslims in Upper Egypt and throughout Northwest Africa. (Note: The Maliki school was represented in the Hijaz and spread to the Arabian Gulf as well as to Upper Egypt and Sudan, Andalusia, and north-west Africa, so that it is now the dominant school in Mauritania, Mali, Morocco, Algeria, Tunisia, and Libya.)

The text deals with the divine aspects of creed, such as Allah's names and attributes, prophetology, and revealed creed (al-sam'iyyat), (Note: The word used here, al-sam'iyyat, refers to all that which can be known only through the Qur'an or Prophetic reports (Hadith) that partake in certainty.) which includes faith in the afterlife. The text also adds additional details on the ranks of the companions and imams, and the five universal legal maxims in Islamic jurisprudence, the foundations of moral philosophy with a little bit of Sufism and etiquette.

Any text that implies similitude, interpret it or entrust (its knowledge to Allah), but seek complete transcendence (tanzīh). — Ibrahim al-Laqqani, Jawharat al-Tawhid (“Jewel of Divine Oneness”), (verse no. 40)

=== Sufism ===
In the poem (v. 81), Al-Junayd, the shaykh of the Sufis, is evoked as “Abū al-Qāsim”, a leader of the community on a par with Mālik [b. Anas]. Reminiscent of Sufi theory is the exhortation in v. 87 to ask one's soul, i.e. oneself, to account for one's deeds. Fittingly, the poem has also been read and quoted by Sufis such as the Khalwatiyya shaykh and poet Mustafa ibn Kamal al-Din al-Bakri (d. 1162/1749). (Note: In one of the first verses of al-Murshid al-Mu'in of Ibn 'Ashir (d. 1040/1631), a didactic poem on religious obligations (prayer, alms, fasting, etc.) and on tasawwuf, al-Junayd is mentioned after the name of Mālik, and thus also evoked as an authority on mysticism.)

== Commentaries ==
Many scholars wrote commentaries and glossaries on this work, beginning with the author himself and his own son, 'Abd al-Salam al-Laqqani (d. 1078/1668).

Ibrahim al-Laqqani (d. 1041/1631) has written three commentaries on his theological poem, the Jawharat al-Tawhid: a short commentary entitled Hidayat al-Murid (The Guidance of the Seeker/Disciple), a middle commentary entitled Talkhis al-Tajrid li-'Umdat al-Murid (Summarizing the Catharsis), and a long commentary entitled 'Umdat al-Murid (The Reliance of the Seeker/Disciple).

His son 'Abd al-Salam al-Laqqani (d. 1078/1668) composed three commentaries as well, respectively titled Itḥāf al-Murīd, Irshād al-Murīd, and Hadīyat al-Murīd. According to the Encyclopedia of Renaissance Philosophy, edited by Marco Sgarbi, states:

The two first works were subject to further commentaries at least down to the late nineteenth century. They, like the elder Laqānī’s original, represent a phase of conservative Ash‘arism that departs from the tradition of philosophically ambitious summae and commentaries that reaches from Fakhr al-Dīn al-Rāzī to ‘Aḍud al-Dīn al-Ījī, Sa‘d al-Dīn al-Taftāzānī, and al-Sharīf al-Jurjānī.

Author	Title
'Abd al-Barr al-Ajhuri (d. 1070/1660)	فتح القريب المجيد بشرح جوهرة التوحيد
'Ali ibn Muhammad al-Tamimi (was alive in 1118/1707)	تقريب البعيد إلى جوهرة التوحيد
Abu al-Fawz Muhammad al-Halfawi (d. 1127/1715)	حاشية على إتحاف المريد
'Abd-al-Mu'ti ibn Salim al-Simillawi (d. 1127/1715)	شرح جوهرة التوحيد
'Ali ibn Khidr ibn Ahmad al-'Amrusi (d. 1173/1760)	حاشية على إتحاف المريد شرح جوهرة التوحيد
Ahmad ibn Muhammad al-Suhaymi (d. 1178/1764)	المزيد على إتحاف المريد شرح جوهرة التوحيد
Ahmad al-Mallawi (d. 1181/1767)	
'Isa al-Barrawi al-Azhari (d. 1182/1768)	حاشية على شرح جوهرة التوحيد
Ahmad al-Jawhari (d. 1182/1768)	Al-Jawahir al-Saniyya (Arabic: الجواهر السنية على شرح العقيدة اللقانية)
'Ali al-'Adawi (d. 1189/1775)	حاشية على شرح الجوهرة للشيخ عبد السلام اللقاني
Muhammad al-Amir al-Maliki (d. 1232/1817)	حاشية على إتحاف المريد
Muhammad al-Shanawani (d. 1233/1817)	
Ahmad ibn Muhammad al-Sawi (d. 1241/1825)	شرح الصاوي على جوهرة التوحيد
Ibrahim al-Bajuri (d. 1277/1860)	Tuhfat al-Murid (Arabic: تحفة المريد شرح جوهرة التوحيد)
Ahmad al-Ajhuri al-Darir (d. 1293/1876)	تقريرات الأجهوري على تحفة المريد
Muhammad al-Ḥanīfī al-Ḥalabī (d. 1342/1924)	المنهاج السديد في شرح جوهرة التوحيد
Muhammad Māḍi al-Rakhawi (d. 1344/1926)	خلاصة شروح الجوهرة، المسمى: الفريدة في العقيدة
Ibrahim al-Marghani (d. 1349/1931)	بغية المريد إلى جوهرة التوحيد
Muhammad Muhyi al-Din 'Abd al-Hamid (d. 1392/1972)	النظام الفريد بتحقيق جوهرة التوحيد
Bakri al-Halabi (d. 1400/1980)	هداية المريد إلى جوهرة التوحيد
Ibrahim Muhammad Ibrahim Gariba	الرأي السديد في شرح جوهرة التوحيد
Muhammad Sa'id ibn Ahmad	
Muhammad ibn 'Abd al-Rahim al-Khantumani	
Husain 'Alawi al-Falimbani	فتح المجيد في شرح جوهرة التوحيد
Nuh al-Qudah (d. 1432/2010)	المختصر المفيد في شرح جوهرة التوحيد
Omar Abdullah Kamel (d. 1436/2015)	الموجز المفيد من تحفة المريد
'Abd al-Karim Tattan	عون المريد لشرح جوهرة التوحيد
Mustafa Deeb al-Bugha	شرح جوهرة التوحيد
Jamil Halim al-Husaini	تسهيل المعاني إلى جوهرة اللقاني
Hisham ibn Muhammad Hayjar	نثر الدر النضيد بشرح جوهرة التوحيد
'Abd al-Salam Shakir	التعليقات المفيدة على منظومتي جوهرة التوحيد وبدء الأمالي
'Abd al-Salam ibn 'Abd al-Hadi Shannar	فتح المجيد في بيان تحفة المريد على جوهرة التوحيد
'Ali 'Uthman Jaradi	القول السديد شرح جوهرة التوحيد
Farid al-Baji	الفيض السديد شرح جوهرة التوحيد

== Translations ==
=== English ===
- Ibrahim al-Laqqani; Ibrahim al-Bajuri (2017). The Gift of the Seeker on the Jewel of Divine Unification. Translated by Rami Touqan (1st ed.). Lebanon: Dar al-Kutub al-'Ilmiyya. ISBN 9782745180186.

=== French ===
- Ibrahim al-Laqqani; 'Abd al-Salam al-Laqqani; Ibrahim al-Bajuri (1907). La Djaouhara: Traité de théologie par Ibrahim Laqani; avec notes d'Abdesselem et d'El Badjouri; Texte arabe et traduction française par J.-D. Luciani (in French). Translated by Jean-Dominique Luciani (1st ed.). Algiers, Algeria: Imprimerie Orientale, Pierre Fontana. OCLC 69071013.
- Ibrahim al-Laqqani; Ibrahim al-Bajuri (1950). Glose (Hâshiya) sur la Jawharat al-Tawhîd: poème théologique d'Al-Laqânî (in French). Translated by Georges C. Anawati; Louis Gardet (1st ed.). Manouba, Tunisia: M. M. Anawati. OCLC 475674762.
- Ibrahim al-Laqqani; Ibrahim al-Bajuri (2015). La Merveille du Disciple - L'Exégèse du Joyau du Monothéisme (in French). Translated by Mostafa Laazouzi (1st ed.). Lebanon: Dar al-Kutub al-'Ilmiyya. ISBN 9782745179104.

=== Malay ===
According to Mohd. Nor bin Ngah, the Malay translation of the Jawharat al-Tawhid belongs to "the most popular and widely used Kitab Jawi," i.e. Islamic theological books in Malay script. Several translations and commentaries in local languages (Malay, Javanese, Sundanese, and Madurese), which are still available in print, testify to its continuing popularity until the present day among Muslims in insular Southeast Asia.

At the end of the nineteenth century, Snouck Hurgronje observed that "a Malay commentary on the Jauharat at-tauhîd (by Ibrâhîm al-Laqânî) after a manuscript written in Sambas" was printed in Mecca.

=== Spanish ===
- Ibrahim al-Laqqani; Ibrahim al-Bajuri (2017). La Maravilla del Discípulo: La Exegesis de "Tesoro del Monoteismo" (in Spanish). Translated by Said Jedidi (1st ed.). Lebanon: Dar al-Kutub al-'Ilmiyya. ISBN 9782745187819.

== Gallery ==
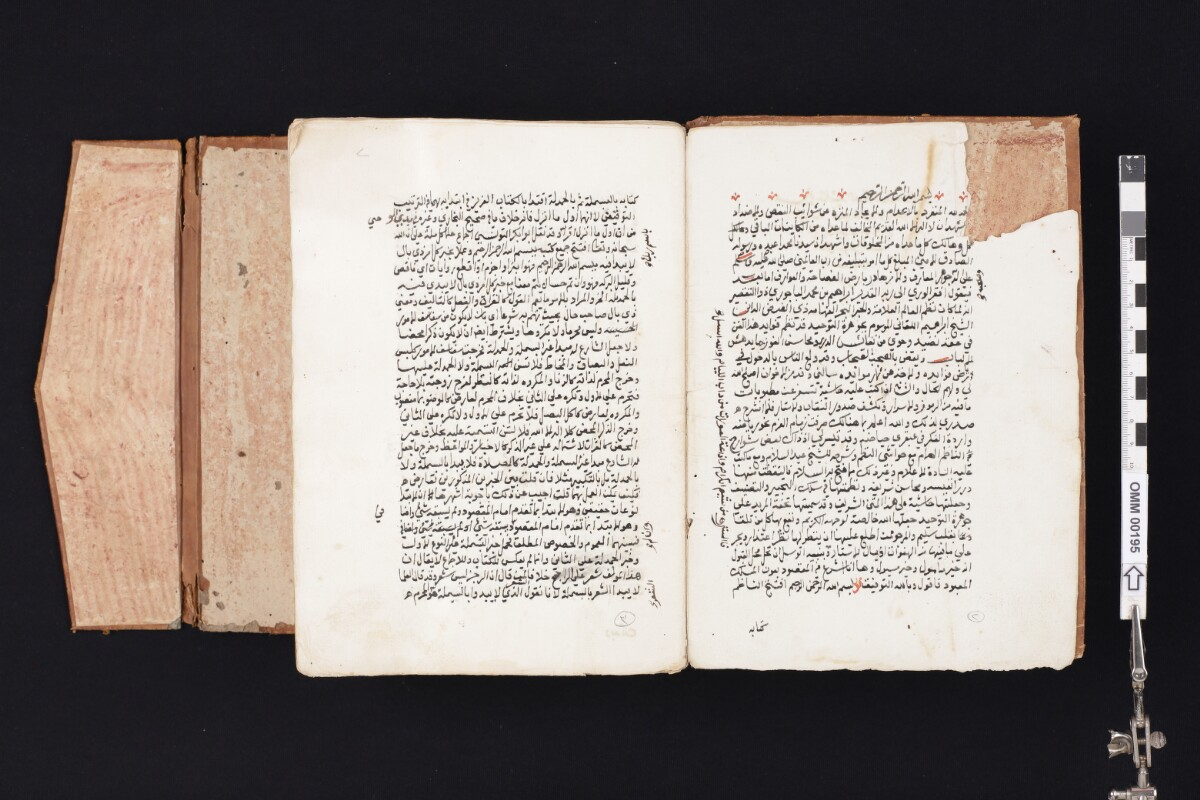
Manuscript of Tuhfat al-Murid by Ibrahim al-Bajuri (d. 1276/1860) on the Jawharat al-Tawhid (“Jewel of Divine Oneness”), digitized by the Endangered Archives Programme of the British Library

== See also ==
- Kitab al-Tawhid
- Talkhis al-Adilla li-Qawa'id al-Tawhid
- Al-'Aqida al-Tahawiyya
- Sharh al-'Aqa'id al-Nasafiyya
- Al-Insaf fima Yajib I'tiqaduh
- Al-Risalah (Ibn Abi Zayd)
- Al-Murshid al-Mu'een
- List of Sunni books
