= Personal god =

Deity who can be related to as a person

A personal god, or personal goddess, is a deity who can be related to as a person (anthropomorphic), instead of as an impersonal force, such as the Absolute. In the context of Christianity and the Baháʼí Faith, the term "personal god" also refers to the incarnation of God as a person. In the context of Hinduism, "personal god/goddess" also refers to Ishtadevata, a worshipper's personal favorite deity.

In the scriptures of the Abrahamic religions, God is described as being a personal creator, speaking in the first person and showing emotion such as anger and pride, and sometimes appearing in anthropomorphic shape. In the Pentateuch, for example, God talks with and instructs his prophets and is conceived as possessing volition, emotions (such as anger, grief and happiness), intention, and other attributes characteristic of a human person. Personal relationships with God may be described in the same ways as human relationships, such as a Father, as in Christianity, or a Friend as in Sufism.

A 2008 survey by the Pew Research Center reported that, of U.S. adults, 60% view that "God is a person with whom people can have a relationship", while 25% believe that "God is an impersonal force". A 2019 survey by the National Opinion Research Center reported that 77.5% of U.S. adults believe in a personal god. The 2014 Religious Landscape survey conducted by Pew reported that 57% of U.S. adults believe in a personal god.

== Views ==
=== Monotheism ===
==== Judaism ====
Jewish theology states that God is not a person. This was also determined several times in the Torah, which religious Jews traditionally believed to be an indisputable authority for their faith (Hosea 11:9: "I am God, and not a man"; Numbers 23:19: "God is not a man, that He should lie"; 1 Samuel 15:29: "He is not a person, that He should repent"). However, there exist frequent references to anthropomorphic characteristics of God in the Hebrew Bible such as the "Hand of God". Judaism holds that these are to be taken only as figures of speech. Their purpose is to make God more comprehensible to the human reader.

==== Christianity ====
In mainstream Christianity, Jesus (or God the Son) and God the Father are believed to be two members of a trinity. Jesus is believed to be of the same ousia (or substance) as God the Father. The Christian God manifests in three hypostases (or persons): the Father, the Son, and the Holy Spirit. Nontrinitarian Christians dispute that Jesus is a "hypostasis" of or a person within a broader God. Whether the Holy Spirit is impersonal or personal is the subject of dispute, with experts in pneumatology debating the matter.

==== Islam ====
From the Shiite perspective, Imam Ali says:

About the greatness and the attributes of Allah Praise be to Allah who is proof of His existence through His creation, of His being external through the newness of His creation, and through their mutual similarities of the fact that nothing is similar to Him. Senses cannot touch Him and curtains cannot veil Him, because of the difference between the Maker and the made, the Limiter and the limited and the Sustainer and the sustained. He is One but not by the first in counting, is Creator but not through activity or labour, is Hearer but not by means of any physical organ, is Looker but not by a stretching of eyelids, is Witness but not by nearness, is Distinct but not by measurement of distance, is Manifest but not by seeing and is Hidden but not by subtlety (of body). He is Distinct from things because He overpowers them and exercises might over them, while things are distinct from Him because of their subjugation to Him and their turning towards Him. He who describes Him limits Him. He who limits Him numbers Him. He who numbers Him rejects His eternity. He who said “how” sought a description for Him. He who said “where” bounded him. He is the Knower even though there be nothing to be known. He is the Sustainer even though there be nothing to be sustained. He is the Powerful even though there be nothing to be overpowered. A part of the same sermon about the Divine leaders (Imams) The riser has risen, the sparkler has sparkled, the appearer has appeared and the curved has been straightened. Allah has replaced one people with another and one day with another. We awaited these changes as the famine-stricken await the rain. Certainly the Imams are the vicegerents of Allah over His creatures and they make the creatures know Allah. No one will enter Paradise except he who knows them and knows Him, and no one will enter Hell except he who denies them and denies Him. Allah the Glorified, has distinguished you with Islam and has chosen you for it. This is because it is the name of safety and the collection of honour. Allah the Glorified, chose its way and disclosed its pleas through open knowledge and secret maxims. Its (Qur’an)wonders are not exhausted and its delicacies do not end. It contains blossoming bounties and lamps of darkness. (The doors of) virtues cannot be opened save with its keys, nor can gloom be dispelled save with its lamps. Allah has protected its inaccessible points (from enemies) and allowed grazing (to its followers) in its pastures. It contains cover (from the ailment of misguidance) for the seeker of cure and full support for the seeker of support.

Anthropopathism existed in the ancient Semitic religion and early Islam.

Islamic theology rejects the Christian doctrine of the Incarnation and the notion of a personal god as anthropomorphic because both demean the transcendence of God. The Qur'an prescribes the fundamental transcendental criterion in the following verse: "There is nothing whatever like Him" [Qur'an 42:11]. Therefore, strictly rejects all forms of anthropomorphism and anthropopathism of the concept of God, and thus categorically rejects the Christian concept of the Trinity or division of persons in the Godhead.

Islamic theology confirms that Allah (God) has no body, gender (neither male nor female), or comparison. However, due to grammatical limitations in the Arabic language, masculinity is the default grammatical gender if the noun is not specifically feminine. This does not apply to the word "Allah" because, according to Islamic theology, Allah has no gender. Allah is also a singular noun and cannot have a plural form. The "We" used in the Qur'an in numerous places is used only as the "royal we", as has been a tradition in most other languages. It is a feature of literary style in Arabic that a person may refer to himself by the pronoun nahnu (we) for respect or glorification. Nothing can be used as a similitude or for the purpose of comparison to Allah, even in allegorical terms, because nothing can be compared with him. Thus, the Qur'an says: "Do you know any similar (or anyone else having the same Name or attributes/qualities, which belong) to Him?" [Qur'an 19:65]. According to mainstream theological accounts, Allah is the creator of everything that exists and transcends spatial and temporal bounds. He has neither any beginnings nor any end and remains beyond the bounds of human comprehension and perceptions. This has been described in the Qur'an at various places, such as the following: "He knows (all) that is before them and (all) that is behind them (their past and future, and whatever of intentions, speech, or actions they have left behind), whereas they cannot comprehend Him with their knowledge." [Qur'an 20:110]

In one of the most comprehensive descriptions, as revealed in Surat al-Ikhlas, the Qur'an says:

1. Say: He, Allah, is Ahad (the Unique One of Absolute Oneness, who is indivisible in nature, who is unique in His essence, attributes, names and acts, the One who has no second, no associate, no parents, no offspring, no peers, free from the concept of multiplicity, and far from conceptualization and limitation, and there is nothing like Him in any respect).

2. Allah is al-Samad (the Ultimate Source of all existence, the Uncaused Cause who created all things out of nothing, who is eternal, absolute, immutable, perfect, complete, essential, independent, and self-sufficient; Who does not need to eat or drink, sleep or rest; Who needs nothing while all of creation is in absolute need of Him; the one eternally and constantly required and sought, depended upon by all existence and to whom all matters will ultimately return).

3. He begets not, nor is He begotten (He is Unborn and Uncreated, has no parents, spouse, or offspring).

4. And there is none comparable (equal, equivalent or similar) to Him.

In this context, the masculinity of huwa (he) with respect to Allah is unmistakably a purely grammatical masculinity without even a hint of anthropomorphism. The Maliki scholar Ibrahim al-Laqqani (d. 1041/1631) said in his book, Jawharat al-Tawhid (The Gem of Monotheism), that: "Any text that leads one to imagine the similitude of Allah to His created beings, should be treated either through ta'wil or tafwid and exalt Allah the Almighty above His creation."

The Hanafi jurist and theologian al-Tahawi (d. 321/933) wrote in his treatise on theology commonly known as al-'Aqida al-Tahawiyya:

He is exalted/transcendent beyond having limits, ends, organs, limbs and parts (literally: tools). The six directions do not encompass/contain Him like the rest of created things.

The six directions are above, below, right, left, front, and back. The above statement of al-Tahawi refutes the anthropomorphist's dogmas that imagine Allah has a physical body and human form and is occupied in a place, direction, or trajectory. 'Ali al-Qari (d. 1014/1606) in his Sharh al-Fiqh al-Akbar states: "Allah the Exalted is not in any place or space, nor is He subject to time, because both time and space are amongst His creations. He the Exalted was present in pre-existence and there was nothing of the creation with Him".

Al-Tahawi also stated that:

Whoever describes Allah even with a single human quality/attribute, has disbelieved/blasphemed. So whoever understands this, will take heed and refrain from such statements as those of disbelievers, and knows that Allah in His attributes is utterly unlike human beings.

==== Baháʼí Faith ====
In the Baháʼí Faith, God is described as "a personal God, unknowable, inaccessible, the source of all Revelation, eternal, omniscient, omnipresent and almighty". Although transcendent and inaccessible directly, his image is reflected in his creation. The purpose of creation is for the created to have the capacity to know and love its creator. God communicates his will and purpose to humanity through intermediaries, known as Manifestations of God, who are the prophets and messengers that have founded religions from prehistoric times up to the present day.

=== Deism ===
While many deists view God as a personal god, deism is a broad term encompassing people with varying specific beliefs, some of which reject the notion of a personal god. The foundational idea of a personal god in deism is illustrated by the 17th-century assertions of Lord Edward Herbert, universally regarded as the Father of English Deism, which stated that there is one Supreme God, and he ought to be worshipped. A god that is not a personal god cannot be worshipped. Nevertheless, the notion of God as a personal god cannot be ascribed to all deists. Further, some deists who believe in a personal god may either not prioritize a relationship with such a god or not consider a personal relationship with such a god as possible.

==== Christian ====
Christian deism is a term applied both to Christians who incorporate deistic principles into their beliefs and to deists who follow the moral teachings of Jesus without believing in his divinity. About those who are essentially deists who incorporate the teachings of Jesus into their beliefs, these are usually a subset of classical deists. Consequently, they believe in a personal god but do not necessarily believe in a personal relationship with God. However, some Christian deists may practice a different (non-classical) form of deism while viewing Jesus as a non-divine moral teacher. The views of these Christian deists on the existence of a personal god and whether a relationship with such god is possible would be based on their core deist beliefs.

==== Classical ====
Classical deists who adhere to Herbert's common notion certainly believe in a personal god because those notions include the belief that God dispenses rewards and punishments both in this life and after it. This is not something an impersonal force would do. However, a personal relationship with God is not contemplated since living a virtuous and pious life is seen as the primary means of worshiping God.

==== Humanist ====
Humanist deists accept the core principles of deism but incorporate humanist beliefs into their faith. The key element that separates humanistic deists from other deists is the emphasis on the importance of human development over religious development and on the relationships among human beings over the relationships between humans and God. Those who self-identify as humanistic deists may take an approach based upon what is found in classical deism and allow their worship of God to manifest itself primarily (or exclusively) in the manner in which they treat others. Other humanistic deists may prioritize their relationships with other human beings over theological beliefs, but still maintain a belief in a Supreme Being.

==== Pandeism ====
Pandeists believe that in the process of creating the universe, God underwent a metamorphosis from a conscious and sentient being or force to an unconscious and unresponsive entity by becoming the universe. Consequently, pandeists do not believe that a personal god currently exists.

==== Polydeism ====
Polydeists reject the notion that one Supreme Being would have created the universe and left it to its own devices, a common belief shared by many deists. Rather, they conclude that several gods who are superhuman but not omnipotent each created parts of the universe. Polydeists hold an affirmative belief that the gods who created the universe are completely uninvolved in the world and pose no threat and offer no hope to humanity. Polydeists see living virtuous and pious lives as the primary components of worshiping God, firmly adhering to one of the common notions set forth by Herbert. Thus, polydeists believe that there are several personal gods. Yet, they do not think they can have a relationship with any of them.

=== Dharmic religions ===
==== Hinduism ====
Vaishnavism and Shaivism, traditions of Hinduism, subscribe to an ultimate personal nature of God. The Vishnu Sahasranama declares the person of Vishnu as both the Paramatma (supreme soul) and Parameshvara (supreme God) while the Rudram describes the same about Shiva. In Krishna-centered theology (Krishna is seen as a form of Vishnu by most, except Gaudiya Vaishnavism) the title Svayam Bhagavan is used exclusively to designate Krishna in his personal feature, it refers to Gaudiya Vaishnava, the Nimbarka Sampradaya and followers of Vallabha, while the person of Vishnu and Narayana is sometimes referred to as the ultimate personal god of other Vaishnava traditions.

==== Jainism ====
Jainism explicitly denies the existence of a non-personal transcendent god and explicitly affirms the existence of personal gods. All gods in Jainism are personal.

One of the major points of dispute between Digambara and Shwetambara is the gender of the gods. Digambara can only be men; any man at least eight years of age can become a god if he follows the right procedure.

Jain gods are eternal, but they are not beginningless. Also, Jain gods are all omniscient, but not omnipotent. They are sometimes called quasi-gods due to this reason.

Gods are said to be free from the following eighteen imperfections:

1. janma – (re)birth;
2. jarā – old-age;
3. triśā – thirst;
4. kśudhā – hunger;
5. vismaya – astonishment;
6. arati – displeasure;
7. kheda – regret;
8. roga – sickness;
9. śoka – grief;
10. mada – pride;
11. moha – delusion;
12. bhaya – fear;
13. nidrā – sleep;
14. cintā – anxiety;
15. sveda – perspiration;
16. rāga – attachment;
17. dveśa – aversion; and
18. maraņa – death.

The four infinitudes of god are (ananta cātuṣṭaya) are:

1. ananta jñāna, infinite knowledge
2. ananta darśana, perfect perception due to the destruction of all darśanāvaraṇīya karmas
3. ananta sukha, infinite bliss
4. ananta vīrya – infinite energy

Those who re-establish the Jain faith are called Tirthankaras. They have additional attributes. Tirthankaras revitalize the sangha, the fourfold order consisting of male saints (sādhus), female saints (sādhvis), male householders (śrāvaka) and female householders (Śrāvika).

The first Tirthankara of the current time cycle was Ṛṣabhanātha, and the twenty-fourth and last Tirthankara was Mahavira, who lived from 599 BCE to 527 BCE.

Jain texts mention forty-six attributes of arihants or tirthankaras. These attributes comprise four infinitudes (ananta chatushtaya), thirty-four miraculous happenings (atiśaya), and eight splendours (prātihārya).

The eight splendours (prātihārya) are:

1. aśokavrikśa – the Ashoka tree;
2. siṃhāsana– bejeweled throne;
3. chatra – three-tier canopy;
4. bhāmadal – halo of unmatched luminance;
5. divya dhvani – divine voice of the Lord without lip movement;
6. puśpavarśā – shower of fragrant flowers;
7. camara – waving of sixty-four majestic hand-fans; and
8. dundubhi – the dulcet sound of kettle drums and other musical instruments.

At the time of nirvana (final release), the arihant sheds off the remaining four aghati karmas:

1. Nama (physical structure forming) Karma
2. Gotra (status forming) Karma,
3. Vedniya (pain and pleasure causing) Karma,
4. Ayushya (life span determining) Karma.

And float at the top of the universe without losing their individuality and with the same shape and size as the body at the time of release.

== Other definitions ==
Lutheran theologian Paul Tillich in his German-language Systematic Theology writings wrote that

'Personal God' does not mean that God is a person. It means that God is the ground of everything personal and that he carries within himself the ontological power of personality...

Anglican theologian Graham Ward distinguished between seeing God as a "Person" and God as a "Subject". He wrote that the "attempt to reconcile or, at least render, theologically coherent, the man-God" of God the Son in 'nineteenth-century biblical criticism'

will always make Christ the Subject par excellence, the Monad defining all monads, the man-without-relation, the self-grounding one. Let me suggest a difference here between Subject and Person, subjectivity and personhood. Subjectivity, though not necessarily tied to a concept of the transcendental ego, is fundamentally concerned with discrete individuals. Personhood, on the other hand, is that sense of self that continually comes from being in relation ...Being made ‘in the image of God’ and, therefore, living imitatio Christi, Christian Persons are not replicas, but embodiments of Christ as Person. Persons, as such, are analogically related to each through Christ. Subjects, on the other hand, are atomised. They are monads. And theologies of Christ as Subject conceive other Christian Subjects as monadic replicas of the same.

Ward quotes John S. Dunne's The City of the Gods: A Study in Myth and Mortality which states that "the personal God and his individual incarnation are abolished in a Calvary from which there emerges the autonomous human spirit, the 'absolute' spirit".

== See also ==
- Bhakti movement
- Bhakti yoga
- Ishta Deva
- Pantheism
- Parasocial interaction
- Personalism
- Personal Jesus
  - Theistic Personalism
- Speculative theism
