= Ashir (disambiguation) =

Ashir may refer to:

== Books ==
- Matn Ibn Ashir is an Islamic book

== People ==
- Ibn Ashir is a Maliki jurist.
- Ashir Azeem is a Pakistani actor.

== Places ==
- Ashir is an Iranian village.
