= Ibrahim al-Bajuri =

Egyptian-Ottoman scholar and theologian (1783–1860)

Ibrahim ibn Muhammad al-Bajuri
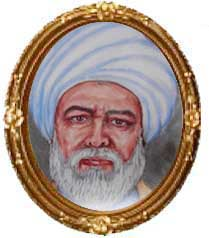

Personal life
- Born: 1784 Bajur, Egypt EyaletOttoman Empire
- Died: 17 June 1860 (aged 75–76) Cairo, Egypt Eyalet, Ottoman Empire
- Main interest(s): Islamic theology, Hadith, Islamic jurisprudence
- Notable work(s): Gloss (hashiya) on al-Laqqani's theological poem, Jawharat al-Tawhid

Religious life
- Religion: Islam
- Denomination: Sunni
- Jurisprudence: Shafi'i
- Creed: Ash'ari

Muslim leader
- Influenced by: Ibn Hajar al-Haytami

Ibrāhīm ibn Muḥammad ibn Aḥmad al-Šhāfiʿī al-Bājūrī (Arabic: إبراهيم بن محمد بن أحمد الشافعي الباجوري) (1784-1860) was an Egyptian-Ottoman scholar, theologian and a rector of the al-Azhar University. A follower of Imam Al-Shafiʽi, he authored over 20 works and commentaries in sacred law, tenets of faith, Islamic estate division, scholastic theology, logic and Arabic.

== Early life ==
Al-Bajuri was born in the village of El Bagour, Monufia Governorate of Egypt. He was raised and educated initially by his father, studying the Qur'an and its recitation. At the age of 14 al-Bajuri entered al-Azhar in order to study the traditional sciences of Islam. In 1798, al-Bajuri left al-Azhar due to the invasion of the French, and went to Giza where he remained until 1801; he then returned to al-Azhar to complete his education. Here, he excelled in his studies and began to teach and write on a variety of topics.

== Rector of al-Azhar University ==
Al-Bajuri taught at al-Azhar University, and in 1847 became its rector, a position he held until the end of his life. During his tenure as Shaykh al-Azhar he spent much of his time teaching. His students included both young students aspiring to scholarship and also many of the great scholars of al-Azhar.

== Works ==
The most popular works in al-Bajuri's extensive literary production are:

- Risāla fī ʿilm al-Tawḥīd
- al-Mawahib al-Laduniyya, a commentary on the Kitab al-Shama'il of al-Tirmidhi
- a commentary on the Burda of al-Busiri
- a commentary on the Takhrib or Mukhtasar of Abu Shuja (Matn Abi Shuja)
- a commentary on the Umm al-Barahin (The Foundational Proofs) of Muhammad ibn Yusuf al-Sanusi
- a gloss on a commentary on the Jawharat al-Tawhid of Ibrahim al-Laqqani
- a gloss on al-Akhdari's commentary on his own al-Sullam al-Murawnak
- a commentary on the Kifayat al-'Awām of his teacher Muḥammad al-Faḍālī
- a commentary on the Mawlid of Ahmad al-Dardir
- a commentary on a versification of the Ajārūmīya of Ibn Adjurrum.

== Death ==
Al-Bajuri died in 1276/1860.

== See also ==
- List of Ash'aris and Maturidis
