= Matn (disambiguation) =

Matn is the text of the hadith.

Matn or Metn may also refer to:

== Books ==
- Matn Ibn Ashir, an Islamic fiqh book
- Matn ar-Risala, an Islamic fiqh book

== Places ==
- Matn District, a Lebanese district
- Ras el-Matn, a Lebanese town
