= D. C. Schindler =

American professor and Catholic philosopher (born 1970)

Doctor David Christopher Schindler
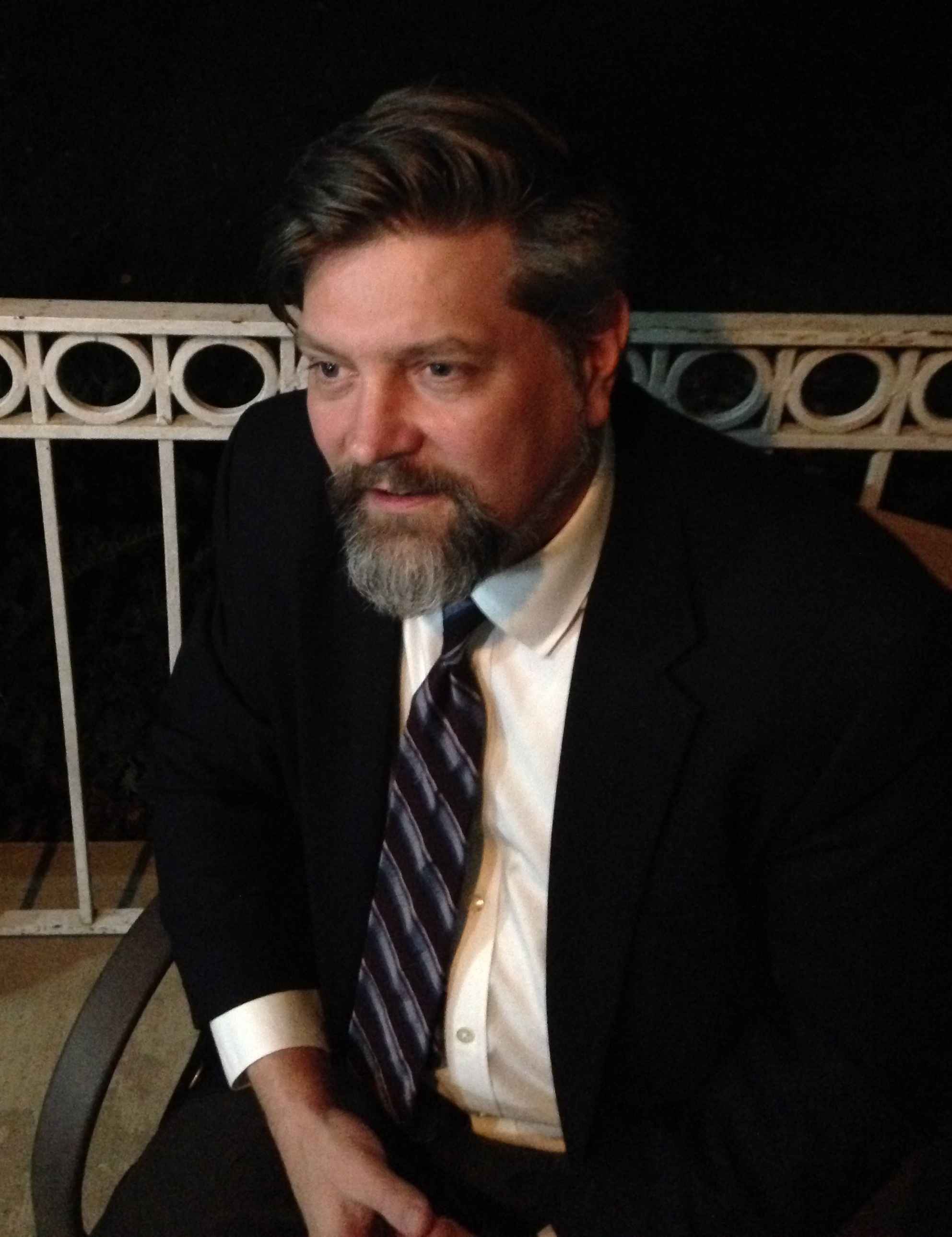
- Schindler in 2018
- Born: 1970 (age 55–56); Upland, California, U.S.
- Occupation: Professor
- Awards: Aquinas Medal

Education
- Education: University of Notre Dame; John Paul II Institute; Catholic University of America
- Thesis: The Dramatic Structure of Truth, in Dialogue with Hans Urs von Balthasar and Continental Philosophy from Kant to Heidegger (2001)
- Doctoral advisor: Riccardo Pozzo

Philosophical work
- Era: Contemporary philosophy
- Region: Western philosophy
- School: Thomism; Continental philosophy
- Institutions: Villanova University; John Paul II Institute
- Main interests: History of philosophy

David Christopher ("D. C.") Schindler (born 1970) is an American Catholic philosopher and translator, specializing in metaphysics, philosophical anthropology, philosophy of religion, and moral and political philosophy. Son of the theologian David L. Schindler, his work falls in the broadly Neoplatonic tradition, though he is also associated with Thomism, certain strains of German idealism, and the Communio/Ressourcement school of theology. He is a professor of metaphysics and anthropology at the Pontifical John Paul II Institute in Washington, D.C.

== Education and academic work ==
Schindler was educated in liberal studies at the University of Notre Dame, where his father, David L. Schindler, was teaching at the time. During his time in college, he completed a year of French study at Université Catholique de l'Ouest, in Angers, France. In 1995, he completed a Master of Sacred Theology at the John Paul II Institute in Washington D.C. He completed a Master of Arts in philosophy in 1997 at The Catholic University of America. In 2001, he completed his Doctor of Philosophy at the Catholic University of America, with a dissertation titled The Dramatic Structure of Truth, in Dialogue with Hans Urs von Balthasar and Continental Philosophy from Kant to Heidegger, under the direction of Riccardo Pozzo.

From 2001 to 2013, Schindler held a teaching fellowship in philosophy and then became one of the founding members of the Department of Humanities at Villanova University, with a stint in Munich for an Alexander von Humboldt Research Fellowship from 2007 to 2008. Since 2013, he has been a professor at the John Paul II Institute in Washington, D.C., where his father also taught. He has served as an editor and translator for the English edition of Communio: International Catholic Review since 2002.

== Honors and awards ==
In 2014, he was invited to give the annual John Paul II Lecture at the University of Dallas; in 2015, he gave the Bitar Lecture at Geneva College in Pennsylvania; in the fall of 2017, he gave the McMahon Aquinas Lecture at Saint Mary's College at the University of Notre Dame; and in the fall of 2018, he gave the Albacete Lecture at the Sheen Center in New York.

In 2022, he was awarded the Aquinas Medal at the University of Dallas, where he also delivered the annual Aquinas lecture. He has also been invited to give lectures at Hillsdale College in Michigan, Franciscan University of Steubenville in Ohio, St. Charles Borromeo Seminary in Pennsylvania, Saint Anselm's Abbey in Washington, D.C., St. Patrick's Pontifical University in Maynooth, Ireland, and other locations.

Schindler was elected vice-president in 2024, and then president in 2025, of the American Catholic Philosophical Association.

== Works ==
- God and the City: An Essay in Political Metaphysics (South Bend, Ind.: St. Augustine's Press, 2023)
- Retrieving Freedom: The Christian Appropriation of Classical Tradition (Notre Dame: University of Notre Dame Press, 2022).
- The Politics of the Real: The Church Between Liberalism and Integralism (Steubenville, OH: New Polity Press, 2021).
- A Companion to Ferdinand Ulrich's Homo Abyssus (Washington, D.C.: Humanum Academic Press, 2019).
- Love and the Postmodern Predicament: Rediscovering the Real in Beauty, Goodness, and Truth (Eugene, OR: Cascade, 2018).
- Freedom from Reality: The Diabolical Character of Modern Liberty (Notre Dame: University of Notre Dame Press, 2017).
- The Catholicity of Reason (Grand Rapids: Eerdmans, 2013).
- The Perfection of Freedom: Schiller, Schelling, and Hegel Between the Ancients and the Moderns (Eugene, OR: Cascade, 2012).
- Plato’s Critique of Impure Reason: On Truth and Goodness in the Republic (Washington, D.C.: The Catholic University of American Press, 2008).
- Hans Urs von Balthasar and the Dramatic Structure of Truth: A Philosophical Investigation (New York: Fordham University Press, 2004).
