= John S. Dunne =

American priest and theologian

The Reverend John S. Dunne CSC
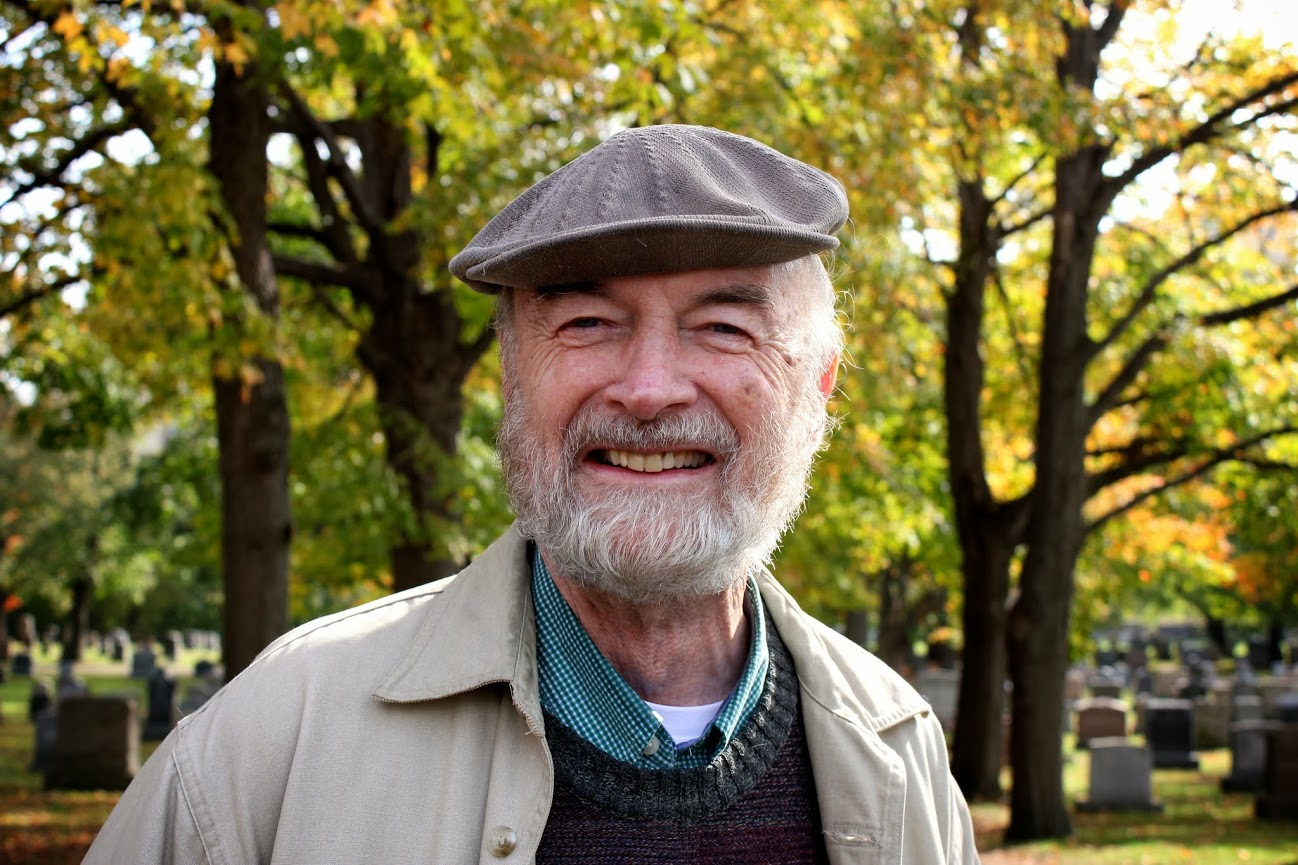
- Image of Rev. John S. Dunne, C.S.C. on the campus of the University of Notre Dame
- Born: December 3, 1929; Waco, Texas
- Died: November 11, 2013 (aged 83); Notre Dame, Indiana
- Occupations: Priest, professor
- Employer: University of Notre Dame
- Known for: Heart's desire

John Scribner Dunne, C.S.C. (December 3, 1929 – November 11, 2013) was an American priest and theologian of the Congregation of Holy Cross. He held the John A. O'Brien Professorship of Theology at the University of Notre Dame.

== Youth and training ==
Dunne was born on December 3, 1929, to John Scribner and Dorothy (Vaughn) Dunne in Waco, Texas. The eldest of three children, his birth was followed by siblings Patrick and Carrin. He attended St. Edward's Academy on the campus of St. Edward's University, Austin, Texas, from 1943 to 1945, and then moved to Holy Cross Minor Seminary at the University of Notre Dame for his senior year of high school. Dunne was received into the Congregation of Holy Cross on Aug. 15, 1946 and made his First Vows on Aug. 16, 1947. He studied philosophy at the University of Notre Dame, where he graduated in 1951. Dunne made his Final Profession of Vows on Aug. 16, 1951, and was ordained to the priesthood on Dec. 18, 1954, in Rome. He earned an S.T.L. in Sacred Doctrine in 1955 and an S.T.D. in 1958, both from the Pontifical Gregorian University in Rome, Italy.

== Professor at University of Notre Dame ==
Returning to Notre Dame in 1957, over the course of 55 years of teaching, Dunne became one of its most popular, even beloved, professors. He taught more Notre Dame students than any other person in the university's history. He wrote some 20 influential works on theology and the spiritual life, including The City of the Gods, The Reasons of the Heart, A Search for God in Time and Memory and Way of All the Earth. His most recent work, Eternal Consciousness, received a first-place award from the Catholic Press Association.

Dunne did additional studies at Princeton University from 1960 to 1961, and also served as a chaplain at Our Lady of Princeton. He returned to Notre Dame to teach from 1961 to 1967. He taught at Moreau Seminary on the campus of Notre Dame from 1969 to 1970 and then again at Notre Dame from 1970 to 1972. Dunne was a visiting professor at Yale University from 1972 to 1973 before coming back to Notre Dame to teach from 1973 to 2013. He lectured at Oxford University during the 1976–1977 academic year. He spent several sabbatical years at the Holy Cross Center, Berkeley, California, throughout his tenure at Notre Dame. He received several awards from the University of Notre Dame, including the 2013 Presidential Award, the Sheedy Award and the Danforth Foundation Harbison Award.

Dunne suffered a fall in 2013 and later died from complications.

== Reception ==
Graham Ward states in Cities of God (2000, Routledge) that Dunne "is, without making reference to them, at one with the Death-of-God theologians, who were, at that time in the States, announcing their own programme of Christian atheism". Ward, citing Dunne's The City of The Gods: A Study in Myth and Mortality, continues that

Like Altizer, Dunne is aware of the striking analogy between the ancient myths of the death of the god and dialectical idealism in which 'the personal God and his individual incarnation are abolished in a Calvary from which there emerges the autonomous human spirit, the "absolute" spirit' (Dunne: 1965, 19). The community is founded upon, and eternally lives out, the death of God; the city as place is fundamentally a mausoleum, the city as community (civitas) is composed of individuals existentially in crisis because bound to die. While recognising that this Hegelianism has led to two other myths of evading death – personal sovereignty with its right to life (Dunne: 1965, 204, 227) and totalitarianism with its Nietzschean embrace of death in order to be strong and available for an immortal future (Dunne: 1965, 211) – the thesis concludes with the sovereignty of death.

== Selected works ==
- Eternal Consciousness. Notre Dame, IN: University of Notre Dame, 2012.
- The Circle Dance of Time, Notre Dame 2010
- Deep Rhythm and the Riddles of Eternal Life, Notre Dame 2008
- The Road of the Heart's Desire: An Essay on the Cycles of Story and Song, Notre Dame 2002.
- Reading the Gospel, Notre Dame 2000, 168 pp.
- The Mystic Road of Love, Notre Dame 1999, 178 pp.
- The Music of Time. Words and Music and Spiritual Friendship, Notre Dame 1997.

Further books by Dunne are listed at Goodreads
