= Salafi–Sufi relations =

Relations between two major Islamic schools of thought

Salafism and Sufism are two major scholarly movements which have been influential in Sunni Muslim societies. The debates between Salafi and Sufi schools of thought have dominated the Sunni world since the classical era, splitting their influence across religious communities and cultures, with each school competing for scholarly authority via official and unofficial religious institutions. The relationship between Salafism and Sufism — whose interpretations of Islam differ — is historically diverse and reflects some of the changes and conflicts in the Muslim world.

Salafism is associated with literalist approaches to Islam, giving importance to literal interpretation of Qur'an, hadith and attaining tazkiya (self-purification) by imitating Muhammad and the salaf (the first generations of Muslims). Sufism is associated with the rectification of the soul (tasawwuf) and is mainly focused in becoming a better Muslim to achieve a higher status in paradise by imitating the Islamic saints (awliya) and pious leaders. Both Sufism and Salafism are not inherently political. However, many Sufis and Salafis have championed common political causes and engaging in Islamist activities.

Although Salafism and Sufism can "overlap", they also differ on key doctrinal issues. Salafi-Sufi debates are often called "polemical". For Sufis, the shaykh or murshid yields unrivalled spiritual authority. For Salafis, scriptural sources form religious authority and anyone who oppose them is misguided. Salafis are critical of various Sufi rituals arguing that such rituals are "irreconcilable with true Islam", as well as condemning the Sufi focus on spirituality alone while shunning the material world.

Relations between the two movements were described by some Western observers as one with "battle lines drawn", or a "rift" found in "practically every Muslim country", and in "the Muslim diasporic communities of the West" as well. Many Muslim scholars and activists are weary of recurring Sufi-Salafi debates and often voice criticism against such polemics, arguing that these debates polarize the Muslim community.

== History ==
Many of the Salafi critiques against various Sufi practices is attributed to the writings of the eighteenth century figure, Muhammad ibn 'Abd al-Wahhab. His early followers were conciliatory towards what they viewed as authentic Sufism. 'Abdullah bin Muhammad Aal Al-Sheikh, the son of Muhammad ibn 'Abd al-Wahhab wrote,

"We do not negate the way of the Sufis and the purification of the inner self from the vices of those sins connected to the heart and the limbs as long as the individual firmly adheres to the rules of Shari‘ah and the correct and observed way."

Some modernist Salafis, sought to reconcile Sufism with the teachings of ibn Taimiyya. Jamal al-Din al-Qasimi criticized ibn Taimiyya and his disciple for denouncing ibn Arabi. He agrees insofar that some allegorical interpretations (ta'wil) were unlawful, but that his theological system and legal method do not violate any Islamic precepts. He argued that one should focus on ibn Arabi more as a theologican and a jurist rather than to his role as a mystic. He regarded the wider Akbari school as a branch of Islamic philosophy. At the same time, al-Qasimi heralded sharp criticism against many practises associated with Sufism, such as ascetism and self-mortification. He further disapproved of visiting the graves of saints or the chanting of God's name, claiming it increases melancholy and spiritual madness. Contemporary Salafis criticise religious practices prevalent amongst various Sufi orders which they consider as bid'ah (religious innovations). However, as a branch of religious sciences, Salafis consider the concept of tasawwuf as an important aspect of Islamic faith. The term "Sufism" has been narrated from the Imams of the Salaf like Ahmad ibn Hanbal, Abu Sulayman al-Darani, Sufyan al-Thawri, Al-Hasan al-Basri, etc. and the authenticity of the term is accepted by all Sunni Muslims. Salafis accepts Sufism insofar as they are in agreement with their own methodology and argue that "true Sufism" aligns with the salaf. According to Ahl-i Hadith leader Sāyyīd Siddîq Hāsân Khān (1832-1890 C.E):

"The science of spiritual wayfaring is to know the soul, the psychological states it has and that act against it. It is also known as the science of ethics and the science of Sufism."

During the Cold War following World War II, the United States and the United Kingdom, launched covert and overt campaigns to encourage and strengthen Islamic fundamentalists in the Middle East, North Africa, and southern Asia. These groups were seen as a hedge against potential expansion by the Soviet Union, and as a counterweight against nationalist and socialist movements that were seen as a threat to the interests of the Western nations. Following a tripling in the price of oil in the mid-1970s and the progressive takeover of Saudi Aramco oil company between 1974 and 1980, the Kingdom of Saudi Arabia acquired large sums of revenue from oil exports. It began to spend tens of billions of dollars throughout the Islamic world to promote Salafi Islam. This has been done through organization such as the Muslim World League which was created by the Saudi government following a nudge from the CIA as a way to organize people in the Third World on the basis of religion, and to suggest the dangerous foreignness of communism, left-wing nationalism, trade unionism and even anti-clericalism. According to Pnina Werbner, the rising Salafiyya reform-revivalist movement, alongside the global modernization process put "Sufi tariqas" in "danger of disappearing altogether" in the 1970s and 80s. Though the tariqas have "revived themselves" since then, Werbner describes the twenty-first century as dawning with mutual competition between the two rival groups "within the world of Sunni Islam."

In recent decades, Salafism has gained noticeable ascendancy in Sunni religious discourse over Sufi-Ash’arism. A "tsunami" of Salafisation is observable across the Arab and Muslim communities, urban centres, in various parts of the world. This is mainly due to the Gulf-backed international funding of Salafism.

== Difference in beliefs and practices ==
There are a number of beliefs and practices where there is a contradiction of interpretation and "authenticity" between Salafis and Sufis as "Islamic" or "un-Islamic":

- Attributes of Allah – Sufis believe that Allah has no shape or body and is omnipresent but independent of space and time. They also believe Allah will make himself visible to the believers in paradise. Salafis believe that Allah will make himself visible to the believers in paradise and he is not omnipresent and is above His Arsh (without contemplating its "how"). He will show his face to the dwellers of heaven as the final gift at the last stage of the Judgement Day.
- Tariqat or tariqah (religious divisional order/school) and fiqh-i-madhhab (jurisprudential order/school) – Sufis, believe in tariqat, a school of mystic learning, following a teacher called murshid by the followers called murid, whereas Salafis reject the concept of tariqah. Sufis mostly follow Fiqh-i-Madhhab with more strict manner, where Salafis don't strictly follow but study and take from various jurisprudential schools named fiqh-i-madhab, in accordance with the Qur'an and hadith, without strict adherence to one madhab, rejecting rigid Taqleed.
- Marifat (concept of divine hidden knowledge) – Sufis believe in concept marifat for their saints, whereas Salafis deny it.
- Walayah (Friendship/ nearness/ guardianship of Allah) and Karamat (miraculous sign) – Sufis believe that besides following the Quran and hadith, getting karamat (connection with devine miracle) is the sign of having higher rank of walayah, whereas Salafis believe that following the Quran and hadith strictly is the only sign of having walayah, and there is no relationship between qaramat and rank of walayah. Sufis believe that walis (gainer of walayah) have control over karamat, whereas Salafis believe that walis have no control over karamat.
- Tazkiah (self-purification) – Sufi belief states that suhbat (company) any specific master is mostly needed (shaikh or pir) for the help or intercession of inner-purification. Salafis believe that, for purification of innerself, the company of all the religious, pious, honest and wise people is equally needed but it must be in accordance with the Qur'an and Sunna. Both Sufis and Salafis uses the Quranic concept of three states of reforming nafs in the interpretation of Tazkiah.
- Ruh (soul), Nafs (instinct) and lataif-i Sitta (the six subtleties) – For describing ruh and nafs, Sufis use the term of Lataif-i Sitta, whereas Salafis reject the idea.
- Definition of bid‘ah (innovation in religious matters) – traditional Sufi scholars argue for an inclusive, holistic definition whereas Salafi scholars argue for a literal definition that entails anything in religious rituals or beliefs not specifically performed, authenticated or confirmed by Muhammad and his companions.
- Mawlid (celebration of the birth of Muhammad) – considered bid‘ah by most Salafis, and some Sufis (Deobandis).
- Urs (commemoration of the death anniversary of Sufi saints) – considered bid‘ah by Salafis.
- Nasheed (poetry in praise of Muhammad) – opposed by Salafis unless there is no bid‘ah (religious innovation).
- Dhikr rituals of various Sufi orders – opposed by Salafis.
- Tawassul (intercession) the act of supplicating to Allah through a prophet, pious person or Sufi saint, living or dead. According to Salafis, "relying on an intermediary between oneself and Allah when seeking intercession" placing him as a barrier between God is among the "ten actions that negate Islam". However, Salafis believe that a living pious man can be asked to pray to God as Tawassul.
- Wasilah of Shafa'ah (intercessionary powers of the Muhammad) – Salafis hold some forms of Wasilah akin to shirk (polytheism). They argue that Muhammad was a mortal and being so is no longer alive and thus incapable of answering the prayers on behalf of those who ask him. Sufis hold that although not physically present in the world, the prophets, martyrs and saints are still alive (hazir nazir). However, Salafis believe that Wasilah mentioned in the Quran and hadith can be taken like Wasilah of good deeds or Wasilah of different attribute names of God.
- Ziyarat (visiting the graves of prophets and Sufi saints) – The Sufi practice of visiting the graves of Saints is also objected to by Salafis. Salafis believe that a Muslim can take journey to only three holiest places of Islam that is Mecca, Medina, and Mosque of Jerusalem as mentioned in the hadith (collected sayings of Muhammad).
- Kashf – Sufis believe that similar or higher knowledge than Quran and sunnah can be achieved through Kashf while Salafis do not.
- Ijtihad – Sufis assert that "Gates of Ijtihad are closed" and obligate laymen to make Taqlid of scholars and saints. Salafis are strong advocates of Ijtihad and insist that laymen should not blind follow a particular scholar in all issues.
- Wahdat al-Wujud or Ittihad is the concept of unity in Sufi metaphysics. This is objected to by Salafis due to the way in which the boundaries between God and believers often appears to blur. Its extent is also contested (to varying degrees) within the Sufis.
- Fana, a concept related to ittihad, is the annihilation of the self in the presence of the divine. This concept is vehemently rejected by Salafis.
- Tanasukh – Some Sufis believe in metempsychosis or reincarnation as Tanasukh, Salafis reject this idea.
- Baqaa – Sufis consider the liberation of the soul to be Baqaa, which they claim is due to meeting Allah, and Salafis also claim that this concept is wrong.
- Kashf – Some Sufis believe in Kashf, a concept of having a mystical state of guidance through direct communication from saints and Prophets in dream, for performing ijtihad outside the realms of shariah. Salafis as well as other traditional Sunni Muslims critique this idea, asserting Ijtihad that is bound by the Qur'an and Hadith.
- Mujahada – Sufis perform it as extreme and prolonged abstinence from worldly things, Salafis follow a moderate way to deal with worldly things according to Qur'an and authentic sunnah.
- Singing and devotional dancing – Many Sufis such as the Mevlevis consider reciting poetry in praise of their saints, celebrating their anniversaries, singing and devotional dancing as means of gaining nearness to God. Salafis reject these practices, and believe that these practices are contradictory to the Shari'a.
- Muraqaba – Sufis practice Muraqaba as meditation, Salafis reject it.
- Maqām – Sufis believe in their own concept of maqāmāt, the steps of self-glorification and purification to get near to God by some practice classified by them, but Salafis reject all the practices to purify oneself, except through the practices of the Quran and hadith.
- Overall character – The character of Salafism is dynamic and adaptive to changing circumstances. Salafism may adopt revolutionary, reformist, revivalist, peaceful or quietest approaches and may also transform as a social protest movement. On the other hand, the structure of Sufism is more hierarchical, complicated, rigid and generally bound by loyalty to authorities. In legal matters, Sufism has fixed rituals and traditions with limited capacity of development or transformation. However, Salafis consider themselves to be reformist and revivalist, regularly debating on legal issues and differ with each other over various rituals, traditions and even creedal doctrines. This is not to say that revivalist/revolutionist Sufi groups do not exist; examples include the Deobandi Movement (including the founders' roles in the Indian Rebellion of 1857) and their Tablighi counterpart.

=== Metaphysics ===
Tawhid is a central tenet of Islam. However, Salafism differs with Kalam - and Sufi metaphysics in regard to its doctrines. The stances of these schools on tawhid and shirk could be starkly different, to such an extent that some of its respective followers may consider each other as falling into shirk. An extremist minority of Ash'arite and Maturidite theologians pronounce Takfir on Salafi Muslims, accusing them of committing shirk and of deifying "an object at the sky". Traditional Islamic scholars consider Tawhid to be pure monotheism.

Like all Muslims, Salafis believe that tawhid includes the shahada (Islamic testimony of faith). In addition to this, Salafi theologians classify Tawhid into tawḥīd al-ulūhiyya ("Unity of Divinity": "belief that only God may be worshipped") and tawḥīd al-rubūbiyya ("Unity of Lordship": "belief that there is only one Lord and Creator"). Salafis believe that Allah is the only deity worthy of worship, and condemn objects deified through religious veneration as false idols. Certain beliefs and practices related to the seeking of intercession and solicitation from prophets, saints, dead ancestors, etc. are thus considered by Salafis as idolatry. With regards to religious matters, Salafis only accept religious evidence from sacred scriptures. This methodology is also used for arbitrating differences with other Muslim sects.

Salafis believe that Allah is the sole legislator and regard the man-made principles of secular systems as an additional violation of tawhid. Proto-Salafist theologian Ibn Taymiyya stressed throughout his numerous treatises that Muslim rulers are obliged to rule by Sharia (Islamic law), in consultation with the ulema (Islamic scholars). Ibn Taymiyya asserted that only Allah was worthy of worship, and that Muslims have to worship Allah by strictly abiding by the Sharia. He further emphasized that Muslims had no obedience towards those rulers who abandoned Sharia and ruled by man-made legal systems.

Sufi philosophers like Ibn ʿArabī advocated the doctrine that tawhid means to realize nothing exists except God, by conjecturing that everything must have been in the mind of God when creating the world, if God is the creator of everything. Other Sufis claimed that various saints acquired "divine consciousness" and hidden knowledge of the universe. In Western thought systems, this is rather known as monism than monotheism.

=== Angels, spirits, jinn, and devil(s) ===
Certain beliefs and folk practices in various regional localities are condemned as idolatry by followers of Salafism. Followers of the Salafi movement regard a number of practises related to beseeching help from the spirits of Awliya (saints) as bid'ah and shirk. Additionally, there are variations between established local beliefs concerning spirits and jinn and interpretations of such entities by Salafis. A range of beliefs about spirits and angels present in tales from various classical Muslim texts are rejected by Salafi reformists, who refer to quotes from the Qur'an and hadith, to bolster their creedal arguments.

Sunni Hadith literature espouses belief in the existence of various supernatural beings, such as jinn, demons, etc. which are affirmed by all Muslims, including Salafis. Various non-Salafi Muslims believe that various devils ("shayatin") and jinns are capable of entering the private spaces and bodies of humans; and affect the ritual purity of Muslims. While Salafis assert that devils are capable of possessing human beings, certain Salafi scholars downplay the role of Shayatin in the context of ritual purification; and emphasize that it is Iblis itself who plays a harmful role by inflicting "waswas" (evil whisperings) on human minds. According to various Sufi perspectives, a set of devils (shayatin) are linked to sinful activities performing psychological functions, and in various desacralized places. Salafi scholars assert that Iblis is constantly attempting to endanger human beings at all times through waswas and various forms of temptations. Various dhikr prescribed in religious scriptures, including the Basmala, are recommended by Salafi scholars to Muslim laymen for recital, to ward off dangers from Satanic temptations.

While the degree and possibility of "fallen angels" is debated amongst Islamic scholars, many Salafi scholars reject the concept altogether. While this stance can be traced back to at least Hasan al-Basri, it is not universally accepted by all Islamic scholars. Scholars like Ibn Jarir al-Tabari held an ambiguous stance on the original nature of Iblis. Majority of Salafi scholars believe that Iblis was originally a Jinn. This was also the stance of Ibn Taymiyya and his pupil Ibn Kathir. In some Turkish Sufi texts, Iblis is alternatively portrayed as neither from Jinn nor from the Angels, describing it as a created being originally known as "Azāzīl".

== Relations by country ==
=== Afghanistan ===
During the first stint in power of the Islamic Emirate of Afghanistan during 1996–2001, the ruling Taliban had suppressed Salafism; motivated by its strict Deobandi tenets. However, after the post-9/11 US Invasion of Afghanistan, Taliban and Ahl-i Hadith allied to wage a common Jihad to resist the invasion. Many Salafi commanders and Ahl-i Hadith organisations joined the Taliban insurgency (2001-2021) under the Afghan Taliban's command. Simultaneously, IS-KP has been waging an insurgency in Afghanistan, seeking to create the Khorasan Province, by increasing the level of religious sectarianism in Afghanistan, which is majority following a more Sufi branch. Thus, Afghan Sufis have long accused movements like ISIS and AQ attempting to discredit and oppress Sufi population in the country. Both Salafis and Sufis condemn these movements.

Majority of Afghan Salafis are supportive of the Afghan Taliban. In 2020, major Pashtun Ahl-i Hadith ulema convened in Peshawar under the leadership of Shaikh Abdul Aziz Nooristani and Haji Hayatullah to pledge Bay'ah (oath of loyalty) to the Taliban and publicly condemn IS-K. The scholars also requested protection from the Afghan Taliban for the Ahl-i Hadith community. After Taliban victory in the War in Afghanistan and Restoration of the Islamic Emirate, hundreds of Ahl-i Hadith ulema would gather to announce their Bay'ah (pledge of allegiance) to the Islamic Emirate of Afghanistan. Numerous Ahl-i Hadith clerics and their representatives held gatherings across various provinces of Afghanistan to re-affirm their backing of the Taliban and officially declare their support to the Taliban crackdown on IS-K.

=== Algeria ===
Algeria is traditionally a tolerant Maliki Sunni sect with also an important diverse Salafi population. However, in the 1980s, Algerian young people were sent by the Algerian government to Saudi Arabia for education in the Islamic sciences; while some youth joined the anti-Soviet war in Afghanistan. The students of knowledge who were trained in Saudi Arabia strengthened the Da’wa Salafism, the tolerant Salafi inspired social movement, in Algeria. However, the youth who had joined the Afghan war were influenced by hardline Qutbism. This would lead to the brutal Algerian Civil War a decade later and sought to create a Sharia-influenced state in Algeria. Both Salafis and Sufis condemned the Qutbist groups and the insurgency was crushed by the military.

=== Bosnia and Herzegovina ===
Traditionally, in Bosnia and Herzegovina, which has a large Muslim population, Sufism is practiced by a part of Bosniaks. Yet, since the 1990s during the Bosnian War, increasing contacts with Salafis was witnessed when a large number of jihadi fighters from Arab world flooded to Bosnia to help Bosnian Muslims. Thus, followed with poor economic conditions in the country and unsettled ethnic conflicts between Bosniaks toward Serbs and Croats, young Bosnian Muslims have become increasingly attracted to the ideology. Many Bosnian Muslims have joined ISIS in the conflict in Syria. Bosnian Salafis respond to claims of "terror allegations" by stating they only try to live a normal life.

=== Bulgaria ===
In recent years, with the rise of far-right, Islamophobia had become more frequent in Bulgaria, with a traditionally Orthodox Christian majority with a significant Muslim minority which practice Sufism as well as tolerant Salafism. As a result, many mosques - both Sufi and Salafi - are targeted on allegations of spreading "ISIS propaganda".

In 2014, a Bulgarian imam, Ahmed Moussa, was sentenced to prison for allegedly "spreading ISIS propaganda".

=== Cambodia ===
Cambodia is the home of a small, but significant Cham minority, almost all of whom follow Islam and are of Sufi traditions. However, during the Cambodian–Vietnamese War at 1980s, the Cham Muslims, which were once victims of genocide by the Vietnamese, joined Khmer Rouge branch against the Vietnamese army throughout a decade and also harassing pro-Vietnamese Cambodian Government despite traumatic Cambodian genocide. This has prompted the rise of Salafism in the country, in which in recent years, have occurred and increased.

=== China ===
Salafiyya is opposed by some Hui Muslims in China, primarily by the Sufi Khafiya, some Hanafi Sunni Gedimu and a number of Jahriyya. The Yihewani (Ikhwan) Chinese sect founded by Ma Wanfu in China was originally inspired by the Salafiyya movement, but evolved away from their origins. When Ma Debao and Ma Zhengqing, attempted to introduce Wahhabism as the Orthodox main form of Islam in China, Yihewani reacted with hostility, accusing Ma Debao and Ma Zhengqing of being traitors of foreign influence, alien to the native popular cultural practices of Islam in China, "Heterodox" (xie jiao), and "people who followed foreigner's teachings" (wai dao), and Salafi teachings were deemed as heresy by the Yihewani leaders. Yihewani eventually became a secular Chinese nationalist organisation.

Ma Debao established a Salafi order, called the Sailaifengye menhuan in Lanzhou and Linxia, separate from other Muslim sects in China. Sunni Muslim Hui tend to avoid Salafis, even family members. Salafis in China remain low in number as they are not included in classifications of Muslim sects in China, and have only re-established since the 2000s, opposed by Sufis; though it is changing due to increasing funds from Gulf Arab states with parallel Salafi Islamic belief, notably Saudi Arabia, Bahrain, the United Arab Emirates, Kuwait and Qatar – in exchange for growing Chinese investments in these countries.

Before the Chinese Communist Revolution, the Kuomintang Sufi Muslim general Ma Bufang, backed the Yihewani (Ikhwan) Muslims and persecuted the Salafi Muslims—forcing them into hiding, preventing them from moving or worshiping openly. After the Communist revolution the Salafis were allowed to worship openly until a 1958 crackdown on all religious practices. the crackdowns on Muslims, as part of wider Cultural Revolution in China, has led to tensions between the Government and Muslims. United by the threat, the Huis attempted to rebel at 1975, but was cracked down by the Government. Since the 1980s, Muslims were allowed to practice their religion in China.

=== Egypt ===
Sufism has been called the "default setting" of Muslim religious life in Egypt where there are 74 Sufi orders (tarikas) and an estimated 15 million practicing Sufis. The number of salafis in Egypt has been estimated at 5-6 million. Salafism has been described as the "most important" religious force in Egypt.

A May 2010 ban by the Ministry of Awqaf (religious endowments) of centuries old Sufi dhikr gatherings was followed by clashes at Cairo's Al-Hussein Mosque and al-Sayyida Zeinab mosques between members of Sufi orders and security forces who forced them to evacuate the two shrines.

In early April 2011, a Sufi march from Al-Azhar Mosque to Al-Hussein Mosque was followed by a massive protest before Al-Hussein Mosque, "expressing outrage at the destruction" of Sufi shrines. The Islamic Research Centre of Egypt, led by Grand Imam of Al-Azhar Ahmed el-Tayeb, has also renounced the attacks on the shrines. According to the newspaper Al-masry Al-youm (Today's Egyptian), in Egypt's second biggest city – Alexandria – the headquarters for 36 Sufi groups and home of half a million Sufis, "16 historic mosques" belonging to Sufi orders have been "marked for destruction by Salafis". Aggression against the Sufis in Egypt has included a raid on Alexandria's most distinguished mosque, named for, and housing, the tomb of the 13th century Sufi Al-Mursi Abu’l Abbas.

In November 2016, images were released purporting to show the execution of the 100-year-old Sheikh Sulaiman Abu Haraz, "considered one of the symbolic Sufi clerics and elders of the Sinai Peninsula". The images were released by Ansar Bait al-Maqdis – ISIS-affiliated extremist group in Egypt which rebranded itself as "ISIS-Sinai" when it pledged allegiance to ISIS (Islamic State of Iraq and the Levant). The group had kidnapped Sulaiman Abu Haraz earlier at gunpoint from in front of his house in Arish city.

On 24 November 2017, a gun and bomb attack on the al-Rawda mosque (known as the birthplace of the founder of Sufism in the Sinai Peninsula) killed more than 305 people and injured more than 128, making it the deadliest terrorist attack in Egyptian history and the second deadliest attack in 2017. The mosque, in Bir al-Abed in the northern Sinai, was attacked by around forty gunmen during Friday prayers. As of late November, no group had claimed responsibility for the attack, but it appeared to bear "all the hallmarks" of an attack by ISIS, and occurred in a district in the Sinai where Islamic State intends to "eradicate" Sufis, according to an insurgent commander interviewed in a January 2017 issue of the Islamic State magazine Rumiyah.

Salafis in Egypt have played important role in combating political extremism and Jihadism. Due to Salafist influence, Alexandria was able to have the least number of violent Jihadist incidents during the 1980s and 1990s, with the help successful Salafist-led theological combat of Jihadism. Salafi networks provide subsidised housing and hospitals, educational centres, healthcare, medical centres, distribution of welfare packages, etc. and hence Salafis have a reputation of being "pious and helpful". Egyptian government promotes Salafism to combat extremist ideologies.

=== France ===
France has the largest Muslim population in Western Europe, counting over 5–8% of French population, mainly the result of French colonization in Islamic countries. In recent years, France has seen an exponential growth of Salafi Muslim converts in the country.

French Salafis follow a progressive logic of being attracted by modern and dynamic trading cities which enable them to set up businesses and become wealthy. By learning foreign languages and as youth knowledgeable in computer science, they are globalised youth who travel frequently between Europe and Gulf states. They also condemn the Jihadis for violence as well as for corrupting Islam in the name of politics. Instead of separation, the French Salafi counter-culture contributes to integration of Muslims, since Salafis hold on to many attractive aspects of Western modernity.

=== Georgia ===
In the Pankisi Gorge, home to the Kists, a small Muslim ethnic group, the Sufi-Salafi division is generational. The older Kists keep Sufi traditions, but young people scorn the old practices and pray in "new, gleaming mosques". Pankisi is reportedly the "only place in Georgia where people keep Sufism alive." Salafiyya movement entered into "a dozen Pankisi villages in the 1990s, popularized by young people educated in Arab countries". Although Sufis protested the conversion of a Sufi shrine for a new Salafi mosque, because of close family ties, there has been no violence between the two groups.

=== Kashmir ===
For "nearly 700 years", the Sufi tradition of Islam has been "part of the cultural and spiritual life" of Kashmir. Essential contributors to the expansion of Islam in general were Mir Sayyid Ali Hamadani, Sayyid Khwaja Khawand Mahmud and his son Sayyid Khwaja Moinuddin Hadi. However, according to journalists Tariq Mir and Asit Jolly, Salafiyya movement is gaining numerous converts in Kashmir society. Since 2000 or so, Salafist call have spread across Kashmir and has grown rapidly, now making up 1.5 million of the nearly eight million Kashmiris. Some 700 well patronized mosques and 150 schools have been built in Kashmir by the "religious and welfare organisation", Jamiat Ahle Hadith. According to state police and central intelligence officers, this construction is part of $35-billion program reportedly devoted to the building of mosques and madrassas in South Asia.

Kashmir's predominantly Sufi-Hanafi community is reportedly anxious over Jamiat Ahle Hadith's rapid proliferation, its increasing popularity among youth, and "mysterious fires" in 2012 that left six Sufi places of worship either completely or partially burnt (although investigators have so far found no sign of arson). Journalist Mir wonders how Sufism will fare against Salafi expansionism "in an age of globalization, free travel, and religious satellite channels". Many Sufi Barelvis believe that the beneficiaries of Saudi largesse are not just the Ahl-e-Hadith (who come closest to Wahhabism) but also the variety of Sunni Islam espoused by seminaries like the Darul Uloom Deoband and Nadwatul Ulema.

The term "Wahabbi" in Kashmir can have contradictory definitions depending on the user of the term, according to author Yoginder Sikand. It is used by Barelvi and related Muslims to refer to Sunni critics of "practices associated with the shrines of the Sufis". These critics being principally Deobandi and Ahl-e Hadith Muslims. Deobandi used the term to refer to the more strict Ahl-e Hadith who oppose taqlid ('imitation') of one of the four Madhhab (major schools of Sunni jurisprudence), and any form of Sufism. The Ahl-e Hadith refer to themselves as "Muslims" and "Ahlul Sunna wal Jama'ah" not Wahabbi.

=== Indonesia ===
Being the world's largest Muslim population, Indonesia has a good record of religious tolerance. However, despite the level of tolerance, it has become more varied with growing sectarianism. A part of Indonesian Muslims belong to the traditional Sufism as well as traditional Salafism represented by Muhammadiyya. However, with the rise of fundamentalist Sufism in Aceh province, religious intolerance has been rising. Leaders of Aceh are mostly Shafiites belonging to the Medieval Ash'ari school. The members of the far-right Sufi fundamentalist group FPI regularly attack Salafi mosques. This has led to uncomfortable situation between Indonesian Salafis and Sufis.

=== Iran ===
While Iran is a majority Shia country, it has a significant Sunni minority population, including those of Sufi and Salafi belief.

When the Shia clerical regime was founded in Iran at 1979, Sunnis were met with heavy repression from the Khomeinist state, and Iranian Sunni leaders have campaigned against sectarianism and championed the rights of Sunni minority in Iran. Due to increasing repression by the fundamentalist regime, more Iranians have turned to Salafism out of disenchantment against the Government. This has led to the phenomenon of "Persian Salafism". Iranian government has since increased their repressive policies against Salafi Muslims in the country.

Overall, Sufis are also persecuted by the Iranian establishment. Alongside numerous Sufi orders, Iranian government has also banned what it labels as "Wahhabism". In addition, Iran has also launched state-sponsored efforts against both Sufism and Salafism, aiming to replace them with the ideological principles of Khomeinism.

=== Jordan ===
Jordan is a majority Sunni country which follows the Sufi teachings of Islam, but due to bordering Saudi Arabia and having an abundance of Salafi scholarship, a significant Salafi population exists. However, due to having Jihadist influences, and unstable neighbors like Iraq, Palestine and Syria, Jordan has always been affected by the radicalization of Qutbism.

=== Libya ===
Prior to the regime of Muammar Gaddafi, Libya was a monarchy, whose king was head of the Senussi Sufi order. The flag of that kingdom was used by the rebels who overthrew Gaddafi in 2011.

Following the overthrow of Muammar Gaddafi, more than 530 Sufi cultural sites across Libya were deliberately destroyed or damaged. While as of 31 August 2012 "no group has claimed responsibility" for the attacks on the sites, the Interior Minister Fawzi Abdel A’al was quoted describing the attackers as "groups that have a strict Islamic ideology where they believe that graves and shrines must be desecrated," an apparent reference to Salafists. The BBC has also identified the destroyers as "Salafist Islamists".

In September 2012, three people were killed in clashes between residents of Rajma (50 km south-east of Benghazi) and "Salafist Islamists" trying to destroy a Sufi shrine in Rajma, the Sidi al-Lafi mausoleum. In August 2012 the United Nations cultural agency Unesco urged Libyan authorities to protect Sufi mosques and shrines from attacks by Islamic hardliners "who consider the traditional mystical school of Islam heretical". The attackers have "wrecked mosques in at least three cities and desecrated many graves of revered Sufi scholars". However, the destruction and desecration did not cease with the Libyan Civil War. In April 2016, Salafists destroyed the shrine and graves of martyrs of the Italian occupation in the town of Misrata.

=== Mali ===
In Mali, Sufis and Salafis condemned the destruction of the Sufi shrines and tombs by Jihadists in the north of that country, according to the Africa Report.

From April 2012 to January 2013 the Islamist Movement for Oneness and Jihad in West Africa (Jamāʿat at-tawḥīd wal-jihād fī gharb ʾafrīqqīyā) and Ansar Dine were in control of Gao, Timbuktu and Kidal in North Mali. "About 30 militants armed with assault rifles and pickaxes" destroyed three mausoleums 30 June 2012, and three more the next day according to witnesses. The group said it planned to destroy all 16 of the main shrines in Timbuktu. Ansar Dine, the group claiming control of the city, is blamed for the attacks. Its leader Mullah Mohammed Omar, stated "Muslims should be proud of smashing idols. It has given praise to God that we have destroyed them." Another leader, Abou Dardar, was quoted by Agence France-Presse as saying that "not a single mausoleum will remain in Timbuktu."

The destruction was criticized not only by Sufis but by a number of Arab and Muslim authorities, political parties, and authors, and as well as Salafi leaders.

=== Myanmar ===
Myanmar or Burma has been long torn by war and religious sectarianisms in the country. It is common to see violence of religious groups in the country, though varied between ethnics and rankings. Burmese Muslims, thus, are not out of range of violence despite their indigenous Sufi faith.

Long anti-Islamic activities started in Burma since the era of Taungoo dynasty. The Burmese king Bayinnaung (1550–1581 AD) imposed restrictions upon his Muslim subjects, but not actual persecution. In 1559 AD, after conquering Pegu (present-day Bago), Bayinnaung banned Islamic ritual slaughter, thereby prohibiting Muslims from consuming halal meals of goats and chicken. He also banned Eid al-Adha and Qurbani, regarding killing animals in the name of religion as a cruel custom. In the 17th century, Indian Muslims residing in Arakan were massacred, providing harmful and actual persecution. These Muslims had settled with Shah Shuja, who had fled India after losing the Mughal war of succession. Initially, the Arakan pirate Sandathudama (1652–1687 AD) who was the local pirate of Chittagong and Arakan, allowed Shuja and his followers to settle there. But a dispute arose between Sandatudama and Shuja, and Shuja unsuccessfully attempted to rebel. Sandathudama killed most of Shuja's followers, though Shuja himself escaped the massacre. King Alaungpaya (1752–1760) prohibited Muslims from practicing the Islamic method of slaughtering cattle. King Bodawpaya (1782–1819) arrested four prominent Burmese Muslim Imams from Myedu and killed them in Ava, the capital, after they refused to eat pork. According to the Myedu Muslim and Burma Muslim version, Bodawpaya later apologised for the killings and recognised the Imams as saints.

Violence between Muslims and Buddhists in Burma increased under both the British and Japanese when two rulers sought to increase level of sectarian divisions. During World War II, Britain backed the Rohingyas while the Japanese backed the Burmese; and massacres between Buddhists and Muslims became a norm in the country's long unstable religious violence.

Thus, due to unstable nature of religious sectarianisms in the country, it has been under easy target of radical Islamic groups, notably radicalization Sufis. Rohingya persecution has also increased radicalization of larger Muslim community in Burma, many have complicated tie with Burmese Government. Fears of increasing persecution of non-Rohingya Muslims lead to the rise of Salafism. Nonetheless, the Burmese Government has yet to have an effective respond to violence between religious groups including Sufis and Salafis, due to lack of cooperation and heavy corruption within the country.

=== Nigeria ===
Nigeria is the home of the Izala Society, a Salafi organization established in 1978 "in reaction to the Sufi brotherhoods", specifically the Qadiri and Tijan Sufi orders.

According to Ramzi Amara,

Today the Izala is one of the largest Islamic societies not only in Northern Nigeria, but also in the South and even in the neighbouring countries (Chad, Niger, and Cameroon). It is very active in Da‘wa and especially in education. The Izala has many institutions all over the country and is influential at the local, state, and even federal levels.

The radical Boko Haram was thought to be inspired from Salafi jihadism, which launched attacks on Sufi shrines in Nigeria, and Nigerian Sufis have accused Salafis for radicalization and terrorism. However, Salafis vehemently condemn Boko Haram.

=== Philippines ===
Traditionally, an important part of Muslims in Mindanao, a major Islamic region in a heavily Catholic Christian Philippines, are Sufis. However, centuries of conflict between Christian Philippines and Muslim minority Moro people has manifested the increase of violence evolved from just war of independence for Moros to become ripe for Salafi-Jihadism.

The most notable Jihadist group in the Philippines is Abu Sayyaf, which split from the Moro Islamic Liberation Front and had pledged allegiance to Islamic State of Iraq and the Levant in 2015. These had engaged against the Catholic Philippines, instigated the Battle of Marawi during which Jihadist fighters occupied the city of Marawi.

=== Poland ===
The Lipka Tatars, an indigenous and traditional Polish Muslim population resided in Poland, a majority Catholic Christian country, after the emergence of Polish–Lithuanian union, are a Sufi traditional Muslim population. Mostly Polonized, yet they are recognized as a symbol of European Muslim integration. Poland has a long historical religious tolerance, though varied and divided by era, and the Lipka Tatars rarely being touched, even fought for Polish Army many years despite historical rebellion and skepticism.

However, increasing Salafism in Poland was witnessed in the 2000s when Islamic Salafi scholars started preaching, and the exodus of Chechen refugees to Poland fleeing after the Second Chechen War, many converted to Salafism. Due to rising Islamophobia, Muslims in general face limitations in Poland.

=== Qatar ===
Qatar is the only one of two majority Wahhabi/Salafi countries in the world, other being Saudi Arabia. Thus, Qatar is often regarded together with Saudi Arabia, as the source of global terrorism, even by Sufi believers, since Qatar and Saudi Arabia both finance for Wahhabi and Salafi activities in the world. While it is common to see Qatari Sufis, Salafism is Qatar's state religion, though Qatar sought to differ with Saudi Arabia's own Wahhabism.

=== Russia ===
While traditionally Christian, Russia has a number of Muslim-majority Republics or "federal subjects", such as Dagestan and Chechnya.

Vladimir Putin, the current Russian President, is thought to have taken a step in favor to pro-government Sufis in Russia. During the inaugural of new Moscow Cathedral Mosque in 2015, he official stated,

The traditions of enlightened Islam developed over many centuries in Russia. The fact that different peoples and religions live peacefully together in Russia is in large part thanks to the Muslim community, which has made a worthy contribution to preserving harmony in our society and has always strived to build relations within and between religions based on tolerance for each other's faiths. Today, traditional Islam is an integral part of Russia's spiritual life. Islam's humanist values, like the values of our other traditional religions, teach people compassion, justice and care for our loved ones. We place great value on these things.

His statement was thought to be anti-Salafism, has been under question for years as if Putin attempts to marginalize Salafis, many are hostile against Russian Government. Some indicates possibility of Russian Government creating a version of Russian Islam which pledged loyalty under the flag of Russia.

Dagestan

In Dagestan "Wahhabi" is the term used by most Dagestanis, although practitioners prefer the term "Sunni" Muslims. While Islam arrived in Dagestan in the late Middle Ages as Sufi Islam "infused with local customs", Salafists began to have an impact by way of Afghanistan after the Soviet Union crumbled in the late 1980s The Sufi scholars of Dagestan have always been defending their people throughout 18th to 19th centuries by leading jihad against Russian colonialists. According to the Abu Dhabi National newspaper

Salafis dislike the Sufi alliance with the government. Sufis run the government-sanctioned Spiritual Board of Muslims, to which the official clergy belong. They also support a secular state. Salafis do not.

According to the Economist magazine "The Islamisation of the conflict" between Caucasus Muslims (in Dagestan and Chechnya) and Russia after the 1994 and 1999 Chechnya Wars "opened up a fierce sectarian fight between Sufism" and Salafism. By the late 2000s the Salafis in Dagestan "were winning support among young Muslims", while the Sufis were "tainted by association with a corrupt and dysfunctional state". Salafist are associated with the forest-based insurgency that has killed an average of three policeman a week in 2011, while police killed 100 people they identified as rebels, over a nine-month period in 2011.

In October 2011, Sirazhutdin Khurikski, an influential Sufi sheikh in southern Dagestan, was killed. In late August 2012, a revered Sufi scholar Sheikh Said Afandi and 5 others were among killed in Dagestan suicide bomb attack. A seventy-five-year-old cleric in the Sufi Brotherhood, Afandi was a key Sufi leader in the North Caucasus and had publicly denounced Salafism. Another Sufi Sheikh, Ilyas-haji Ilyasov was assassinated on 3 August 2013, just a year after Said Afandi. The Russian government is considered suspect since they benefited from these assassinations of scholars who were critical of Russian government.

Despite theological disputes between the two groups, Salafis and Sufis are "uniting in the face of twin threats: IS recruitment and the Russian government's lawlessness." Numerous Salafi mosques are pressurised to shut down by framing the Imams. Salafi scholars allege that instead of letting them theologically refute radical Jihadists, the Russian authorities are radicalising young Muslims and pushing them into insurgency. However, the Russian Government launched massive crackdowns on Salafi activities since 2015, and target young Muslims under the label "Wahhabi extremist" without any solid grounds of offence.

Chechnya

The President (Aslan Maskhadov) of another Muslim-majority "federal subject" of Russia, Chechnya, took a Russian-backed position in 1999, saying, "We are Nakshband and Qadiri Sunnites, and there is no place for any other Islamic sect in Chechnya. ... We cannot tolerate a situation where the enemies of Islam trample under foot the century-old traditions of the Chechen people, desecrate the name of our saints...". However, despite this Russians still suspected Maskhadov of collaboration with Islamist opposition and reignited the Second Chechen War in 1999. Chechens had elected Maskhadov president in January 1997 because of his war record, and because he promised a more peaceful future. Despite this, Russian government labelled him a terrorist. Since the 2000s, Salafi Muslims have been under Russian Government surveillance.

=== Saudi Arabia ===
In Saudi Arabia for many years Sufi brotherhoods, (also known as "mystical" brotherhoods), were proscribed by the government, and a "monopoly on religious matters" was given to the official "scholarly Islam of ulemas", according to Gilles Kepel. The official religion supported by the ulema in Saudi Arabia is often referred by outsiders as Wahhabism. Qutbist and Salafi-Jihadist groups prefer to call it the "Salafi movement of the Sheikh".

However, the 9/11 attacks, brought scrutiny of the official creed in Saudi. Amongst other things it has propelled the Saudi religious establishment to adopt a more lenient approach to other interpretations of Islam by the Saudi religious establishment. As of 2006, Sufi gatherings are legal in the Kingdom.

=== Somalia ===
Traditionally, a part of Islam in Somalia has followed Sufism (as well as Ash’ariyah theology and Shafi’i jurisprudence). Salafi-Jihadist/Qutbist groups such as Al-Shabab and earlier Hizbul Islam have used force to impose their version of Islamism. These groups also persecute Salafis, and Salafi scholars vehemently condemn them. Under areas of Al-Shabab rule in Somali, Sufi ceremonies were banned and shrines destroyed. As the power of Al-Shabab has waned, however, Sufi ceremonies are said to have "re-emerged".

=== Sri Lanka ===
On Easter Sunday 21 April 2019, the National Thowheeth Jama'ath, a radical Qutbist group inspired by IS, bombed Christian churches and luxury hotels in Colombo Sri Lanka, killing over 250 people. Several days later a memo circulated by Sri Lankan security services stated that there was "credible information" that the National Thowheeth Jama’ath, was planning another attack "specifically targeting Sufi shrines." Salafi organisations condemned the terrorist attacks.

=== Thailand ===
Thailand is widely seen as a religiously tolerant nation, as Thai people rarely discriminate people of non-Buddhist backgrounds despite 95% Thais being Buddhists. Thai Muslims, mostly Sufis, have been active in Thai society and sometimes hold high positions in Thai Government. Nonetheless, increasing religious intolerance between Thai Sufis and Thai Salafis have been witnessed since the 2000s. Ismail Lutfi Chapakiya and Sheikh Rida Ahmad Samadi, who led the Salafi reformist movement in Thailand, have been active since and often promote a more tolerant version of Islam in the country; however despite this, it remains a pragmatic approach trying to be tolerant as possible in fear of provocation.

=== Tunisia ===
The media site Al-Monitor reported that 39 Sufi shrines were destroyed or desecrated in Tunisia, from the 2011 revolution to January 2013. Beji Caid Essebsi, the leader of centre-left, Nida Tunis party, accused Islamist Ennahda of not punishing the perpetrators and of sympathising with extremist groups. Meanwhile, a diverse and tolerant Salafi community is also rising with many Muslims attracted to its call.

=== Turkey ===
The Turks have a long tensions and hostility against anything Wahhabism and Salafism, due to historical experience as the Ottoman Empire.

The Turks had engaged against the Saudis in a brutal Wahhabi War began at 19th century. The war, which the Saudis sought to legitimize their influence and denouncing Ottoman Caliphate, was met with anger from the Ottoman Government. War broke out and the Turks suppressed the Wahhabis, beheaded its leaders including Abdullah bin Saud, and banned Wahhabism across the empire. Nonetheless, with the end of World War I, the Turks were forced to depart and the Wahhabis soon took over Mecca and Medina. Yet, resentment against Wahhabi remains high in Turkish society, which culminated following the murder of Jamal Khashoggi in Istanbul.

Turkey has continued prohibition and limitation of Wahhabism and Salafism across the country, and even claimed they are fighting them for 200 years.

=== United States ===
In the United States, Sufi leader Muhammad Hisham Kabbani is well known for his vocal criticism of Wahhabism. Kabbani, who moved to the United States in 1990 as an emissary of his teacher, Shaykh Muhammad Nazim Al-Haqqani, the grand shaykh of the Naqshbandi order, has described Wahhabism as being "like an octopus" because 'Its tentacles are reaching everywhere.' According to Kabbani, when he arrived in the US from Lebanon in 1990 he was shocked to hear Wahhabi doctrines being preached at Friday sermons. 'I asked myself: Is Wahhabism active in America? So I started my research. Whichever mosque I went to, it was Wahhabi, Wahhabi, Wahhabi, Wahhabi.' In 1999, during a forum organised by the US Department of State, Kabbani charged that '80 per cent' of the mosques in the U.S. were run by extremists. However, this does not mean that their attitudes are more liberal than those of the Salafis. When it comes to the matter of excommunication (takfīr) as well as other beliefs, Sufis accuse Salafi scholars of being too lenient. Sufis also have puritan dress codes.

Following September 11 attacks, it has led to increasing resurgence of Islamophobia across the U.S., and as a result, both Sufis and Salafis face discrimination.

=== Vietnam ===
Vietnam has a long and complicated relationship with the Cham minority – a recognized minority in the country, who were once indigenous in Central Vietnam while maintaining a long history of religious relations, though varied between persecution and tolerance. This complicated nature also brought the complex of relations between Salafis and Sufis in Vietnam. Vietnamese Muslim population counted over 0,5–1% of the country's total 90 million population which are overwhelmingly Buddhist with large Christian population.

First spreading since the 15th century, the Cham population of Vietnam went to become majority Muslims with significant minority Hindus at 17th century when Champa went to near destruction. Under Vietnamese rule, it was characterized as complex due to varied level of tolerance and persecution; and there existed two types of Cham Islam since: the Cham Bani which incorporated between Islam, Cham paganism, Buddhism and Hinduism; and the traditional Cham Islam followed the model of Muhammad. Chams have been loyal to the Vietnamese state in some periods of history; and there were several Muslim brigades founded by the Vietnamese dynasty to wage war and guard the border. However, increasing persecutions in 19th century led to an anti-Vietnamese uprising by a Sufi cleric, Khatip Suma. It was violently suppressed, and the systematic oppression of Cham Muslims continued even after the French conquest. It was the French conquest that saw the arrival of Salafism in the country. Salafism, first spread by a Cham who educated in Saudi Arabia, Mohammad Badri, growing at 1960s during the Vietnam War. Badri sought to purify Islam. But the radical Sufis accused Salafis of being heretics. This caused a rift between majority Cham Sufis and small but a growing Cham Salafi population.

After more 25 years with Vietnam's Đổi mới reforms, return of hazard religious tolerance and Badri's death, his son Abdulazim Badri continued his father's path and spread tolerant teaching across the society in accordance with Salafi methodology. In 2001, scholar Phạm Hữu Đạt, a Kinh, accused the Cham Salafis for trying to using aids from Gulf Arab states to finance for Salafi activities, taking refuge in Malaysia to spread what he alleged as heretical doctrines and sought Salafism to be banned.

The Government of Vietnam, having long complex relations with the Chams, maintains heavy security surveillance over both Sufis and Salafis, and has limited a number of Islamic scholars entering the country without possible requirements.

== See also ==
- 2016 international conference on Sunni Islam in Grozny
- Kitab al-Tawhid
