= Marco Sgarbi =

Historian

Marco Sgarbi (born 14 August 1982) is an Italian philosopher and an historian of philosophy, with a special interest in the history of epistemology and logic. He is full professor at the Ca' Foscari University of Venice. He is member of the Accademia Nazionale Virgiliana.

== Biography ==
Marco Sgarbi was born in 1982 in Mantua, Italy, and received his Ph.D. from the Università di Verona.

He is the editor of Philosophical Readings, a four-monthly on-line journal, and of Studies and Sources in the History of Philosophy Series by Aemme Edizioni. He is also member of the editorial board of Lo Sguardo, Estudios Kantianos, philosophy@lisbon, Etica & Politica / Ethics & Politics, and Rivista di letteratura religiosa italiana.

He is the editor of the series Bloomsbury Studies in the Aristotelian Tradition.

He works for the promotion of women rights and their advancement in the society. He founded LEI-Center for Women's Leadership at Ca' Foscari University of Venice

== Research ==
His work has focused on Kant, Aristotelianism, Renaissance philosophy and intellectual history. In his "Kant and Aristotle", Sgarbi follows Giorgio Tonelli's investigations and he examines the intellectual situation of Königsberg in the years of the formation of the Kantian philosophy, assuming that Königsberg with its university are the framework from which Kant actually took fundamental ideas and problems. In particular he focuses on the Aristotelian tradition, on Schulphilosophie, and on the Eclectic movement, which dominated Königsberg up to the advent of Kant's critical philosophy. In "Kant e l'irrazionale", which is also translated in Spanish, Sgarbi shows that the third Critique is neither a book on aesthetics nor on teleology, but on an hermeneutical not-conceptual logic. "Kant on Spontaneity" is the first full-length study of the problem of spontaneity in Kant. He demonstrates that spontaneity is a crucial concept in relation to every aspect of Kant's thought. He begins by reconstructing the history of the concept of spontaneity in the German Enlightenment prior to Kant and goes on to define knowing, thinking, acting and feeling as spontaneous activities of the mind that in turn determine Kant's logic, ethics and aesthetics. He shows that the notion of spontaneity is key to understanding both Kant's theoretical and practical philosophy.

In intellectual history, he proposes an original methodology based on the history of problems, in competition with the methodology of the history of ideas and Begriffsgeschichte. In his view, history of problem is 1) based on original elements of human experience; 2) always new, because the experience of problems and their solutions are always new; 3) rich, because to one problem refers to multiple ideas and conceptualities; 4) infinite, because the solutions and approaches to the problems are infinite; 5) interdisciplinary, because different sciences can solve the same problem from different points of view; 6) intercultural, because problems are common elements of the various civilizations; 7) able to open new ways to find new solutions.

In March 2014 at the Renaissance Society of America Annual Meeting in New York, Sgarbi presented his conception of Renaissance, called "Liquid Renaissance" and based on reflexive historiography. He employs “liquid” in the same way of contemporary historians and sociologist to characterize "liquid democracy" or "liquid society", that is when one or more parts of the whole constitute dynamically, voluntarily or involuntarily, the whole itself that circularly and continuously redefines the parts. He emphasizes that we cannot help seeing the past from the point of view of the present, but we should do it in a correct way, otherwise, certain aspects of the past may be overlooked or misunderstood. Renaissance should be carefully historically qualified according to time and place and should be constantly redefined according to the progress of scholarship, since what the Renaissance was or is shifts almost kaleidoscopically, establishing the existence of many Renaissances.

In his ERC project Sgarbi explored the role of logic and epistemology in Renaissance Italy, focusing Antonio Tridapale, Alessandro Piccolomini, Niccolò Massa, Sebastiano Erizzo, Sperone Speroni, Benedetto Varchi and Francesco Robortello. His research shed light on the emergence of a new conception of knowledge, on in which knowledge is above all else power. With the idea that knowledge is not only power, but a power that must be available to all, this knowledge represented a radical shift compared to previous conceptions in which knowledge was held exclusively by the universities and the clergy. It constituted an impulse towards the democratization of knowledge. Within this framework, Sgarbi argues, that logic, especially logic in the vernacular took on an entirely new role within the encyclopedia of sciences, becoming a general instrument for discovering new knowledge. His research focused on Francesco Robortello's theory of the popularization of knowledge and claims that popularization, vulgarization and translation are means for educating people, not reducing high culture to lower level.

His study on Renaissance epistemology led to a new understanding of the audience of the vernacular works, the rise of the vernacular language and Aristotelianism, the definition of what was meant by vulgarizing in the Italian Renaissance. His research shows that vernacular renderings of Aristotle's works were aims at the people, including men lacking culture or knowledge of Latin as well as princes, men of letters, women and children. Vulgarization was not just a simple matter of simplifying and trivializing knowledge, but a way to learn common people.

His research examined all the treatises that deal explicitly with the theory of vulgarization and translation in Renaissance Italy and led to the conclusion that it is impossible to state unequivocally that to vulgarize does not always mean to transpose into the vernacular, namely to translate, but can sometimes also have the broader meaning of popularizing. Hence not every translation is a vulgarization. As regards both translations and other forms of vulgarizations, it meant rendering in the vernacular for the purpose of making content more accessible. Content is never at the expense of rhetoric or the eloquence. Sgarbi calls this process "philologism of the content".

He studied the epistemology and the new conception of knowledge in the context of vernacular mechanics, physics and meteorology. At the Renaissance Society of America Annual meeting in Berlin in 2015 he showed how besides the Latin production, various Italian vernacular commentaries, expositions and translations of the Pseudo-Aristotelian Mechanical Problems were produced for very practical purposes. Works such as those of Oreste Biringucci, Antonio Guarino, Giuseppe Moletti, and Nicolò Tartaglia were addressed to engineers, architects and bombardiers. He researched on Trifon Gabriele's philosophical works on meteorology, by showing how the eclectic perspective was peculiar of the cultural contexts outside the university, as the academies, which were more open to the contamination of various philosophical traditions.

Sgarbi investigated the philosophy in Renaissance academies (Accademia degli Infiammati, Accademia fiorentina, Accademia dei Vivi), by examining authors like Nikola Vitov Gučetić, Francesco Barozzi, Alessandro Piccolomini, Benedetto Varchi, Ludovico Dolce and Sperone Speroni.

In his monograph on the immortality of the soul in Renaissance Italy, he shows how this topic usually matter of scholastic debate among university professors became common currency in vernacular writings too. These works show high eclecticism of Aristotelianism with Platonism and Hermeticism in order to save the idea of the individual immortality of the soul.

His latest research is on the epistemologies of medicine and its impact on early modern philosophy. During the conference (De)Constructing authority in early modern cosmology Sgarbi showed how the anatomical epistemological model influenced Galileo's notion of sensate esperienze.

== Bibliography ==
- Francesco Robortello (1516-1567). Architectural Genius of the Humanities (London: Routledge, 2019).
- Profumo d’immortalità. Controversie sull’anima nella filosofia volgare del Rinascimento (Roma: Carocci, 2016).
- Kant and Aristotle. Epistemology, Logic, and Method (New York: SUNY Press, 2016).
- The Italian Mind. Vernacular Logic in Renaissance Italy (Leiden: Brill, 2014).
- Kant e l'irrazionale (Milano: Mimesis, 2013).
- The Aristotelian Tradition and the Rise of British Empiricism. Logic and Epistemology in the British Isles (1570–1689) (Dordrecht: Springer, 2013).
- Kant on Spontaneity (London-New York: Continuum, 2012).
- Immanuel Kant, Critica del Juicio (Madrid: Maya, 2011).

He is also the editor of:

- with Matteo Cosci: The Aftermath of Syllogism Aristotelian Logical Argument from Avicenna to Hegel (London: Bloomsbury, 2018).
- Translatio studiorum. Ancient, Medieval and Modern Bearers of Intellectual History (Leiden: Brill, 2012).
- with Piero Giordanetti and Riccardo Pozzo: Kant's Philosophy of Unconscious (Berlin-New York: Walter De Gruyter, 2012).
- with Seung-Kee Lee, Riccardo Pozzo and Dagmar von Wille, Philosophical Academic Programs of the German Enlightenment: A Literary Genre Recontextualized (Stuttgart-Bad Cannstatt: Frommann-Holzboog, 2012).
- Bruno Nardi, Naturalismo e Alessandrismo nel Rinascimento (Brescia: Torri d’Ercole, 2012).
- with Valerio Rocco Lozano: Diritto e storia in Kant e Hegel (Trento: Verifiche, 2011).
- with Riccardo Pozzo: Begriffs-, Ideen- und Problemgeschichte im 21. Jahrhundert (Wiesbaden: Harrassowitz, 2011).
- Thomas Hobbes, Logica, (Pisa: ETS [Parva philosophica. Le perle 28], 2011).
- with Leonel Ribeiro dos Santos, Ubirajara Rancan de Azevedo Marques, Gregorio Piaia, and Riccardo Pozzo: Was ist der Mensch/Que è o homem? Antropologia, Estética e Teleologia em Kant (Lisboa: Centro de Filosofia da Universidade de Lisboa, 2010).
- Marino Gentile, La dottrina delle idee numeri e Aristotele, with an introduction by Enrico Berti (Verona: Aemme Edizioni, 2010).
- The Kant-Weymann Controversy. Two Polemical Writings on Optimism (Verona: Aemme Edizioni, 2010).
- Francisco Suárez and his Legacy. The Impact of Suárezian Metaphysics and Epistemology on Modern Philosophy (Milano: Vita e pensiero, 2010).
- Pietro Pomponazzi. Tradizione e dissenso (Firenze: Olschki, 2010).
- Jacopo Zabarella, Opera physica (Verona: Aemme Edizioni, 2009).
- with Riccardo Pozzo: Eine Typologie der Formen der Begriffsgeschichte (Hamburg: Meiner, 2010).
- with Riccardo Pozzo: Kant e Hegel tra Europa e America (Torino: Rosenberg & Sellier, 2009).
- with Riccardo Pozzo: Kant and the Philosophical Tradition, special issue of Kant e-Prints, Campinas N.S. 3 (2008): 89-373.
- with Riccardo Pozzo: I filosofi e l’Europa (Milano: Mimesis, 2009).

Articles in English:

- “What was meant by vulgarizing in the Italian Renaissance?”, Intellectual History Review, (2019): 1-28.
- "Renaissance Facultative Logic and the Workings of the Mind: The Cognitive Turn", in Stephan Schmid (ed.), Philosophy of Mind in the Late Middle Ages and Renaissance (London: Routledge, 2018), 270–290.
- “What does a Renaissance Aristotelian look like? From Petrarch to Galilei,” HOPOS. The Journal of the International Society for the History of Philosophy of Science, 7 (2017): 226–45.
- “What was a Renaissance Academy? An Aristotelian Perspective,” Archivum Mentis, 6 (2017), 263–88.
- “The Instatement of the Vernacular as Language of Culture. A New Aristotelian Paradigm in Sixteenth-Century Italy,” Intersezioni, 36 (2016): 319–43.
- “Aristotle and the People. Vernacular Philosophy in Renaissance Italy,” Renaissance & Reformation, 39 (2016): 59–109.
- “Francesco Robortello on Topics,” Viator, 47 (2016): 365–388.
- “Benedetto Varchi on the Soul. Vernacular Aristotelianism between Reason and Faith,” Journal of the History of Ideas, 76 (2015): 1-23.
- “Thomas White, an Aristotelian Response to Scepticism,” Archiwum Historii Filozofii, 58 (2013): 83–96.
- “Ralph Lever’s Art of Reason, Rightly Termed Witcraft (1573),” Bruniana & Campanelliana, 19 (2013): 149–164.
- “Hume’s Source of the “Impression-Idea” Distinction,” Anales del Seminario de Historia de la Filosofía, 2 (2012): 561–576.
- “Towards a Reassessment of British Aristotelianism,” Vivarium. An International Journal for the Philosophy and Intellectual Life of the Middle Ages and Renaissance, 50 (2012): 85–109.
- “Metaphysics in Königsberg prior to Kant (1703-1770),” /Trans/Form/Ação/, 33 (2010): 31–64.
- “The Historical Genesis of Kantian Concept of Transcendental,” Archiv für Begriffsgeschichte, 53 (2011): 97–117.
- “Abraham Calov and Immanuel Kant. Aristotelian and Scholastic Traces in Kantian Philosophy,” Historia Philosophica, 5 (2010): 55–62.
- “At the Origin of the Connection between Logic and Ontology. The Impact of Suárez’s Metaphysics in Königsberg,” Anales Valentinos, 71 (2010): 145–159.
- “Kant’s Concept of Spontaneity within the Tradition of Aristotelian Ethics,” Studia Kantiana, 8 (2009): 121–139.
- “The Spontaneity of Mind in Kant’s Transcendental Logic,” Fenomenologia e società, 2 (2009): 28–19.
- “Kant’s Ethics as a part of Metaphysics: The Role of Spontaneity,” Kant e-prints, 3 (2008): 265–278.
- "Concepts vs. Ideas vs. Problems. Historiographical Strategies in Writing History of Philosophy," in Riccardo Pozzo e Marco Sgarbi (eds.), Begriffs-, Ideen- und Problemgeschichte im 21. Jahrhundert, (Wiesbaden: Harrassowitz, 2011), 69–80.
- "Kant, Aristotle and the Rise of Facultative Logic," in Ennio De Bellis (ed.), Aristotle and the Aristotelian Tradition (Soveria Mannelli: Rubbettino 2008), 405–416.
- "Theory of the History of Problems. A Re-contextualization," in Gürcan Koçan (ed.), Transnational Concepts, Transfers and the Challenge of Peripheries, Istanbul Teknik Universitesi Press, Istanbul 2008, 107–125.
- "Spontaneity from Leibniz to Kant. Sources and Studies," in Herbert Berger, Jürgen Herbst, and Sven Erdner (eds.), Einheit in der Vielheit: XII. Internationaler Leibniz-Kongress (Hannover: Leibniz Gesellschaft 2006), 989–996.
