= The Book of Tawhid: The Right of Allah Upon His Servants =

Book about Islam

The Book of Tawheed, which is Allah’s right over His servants
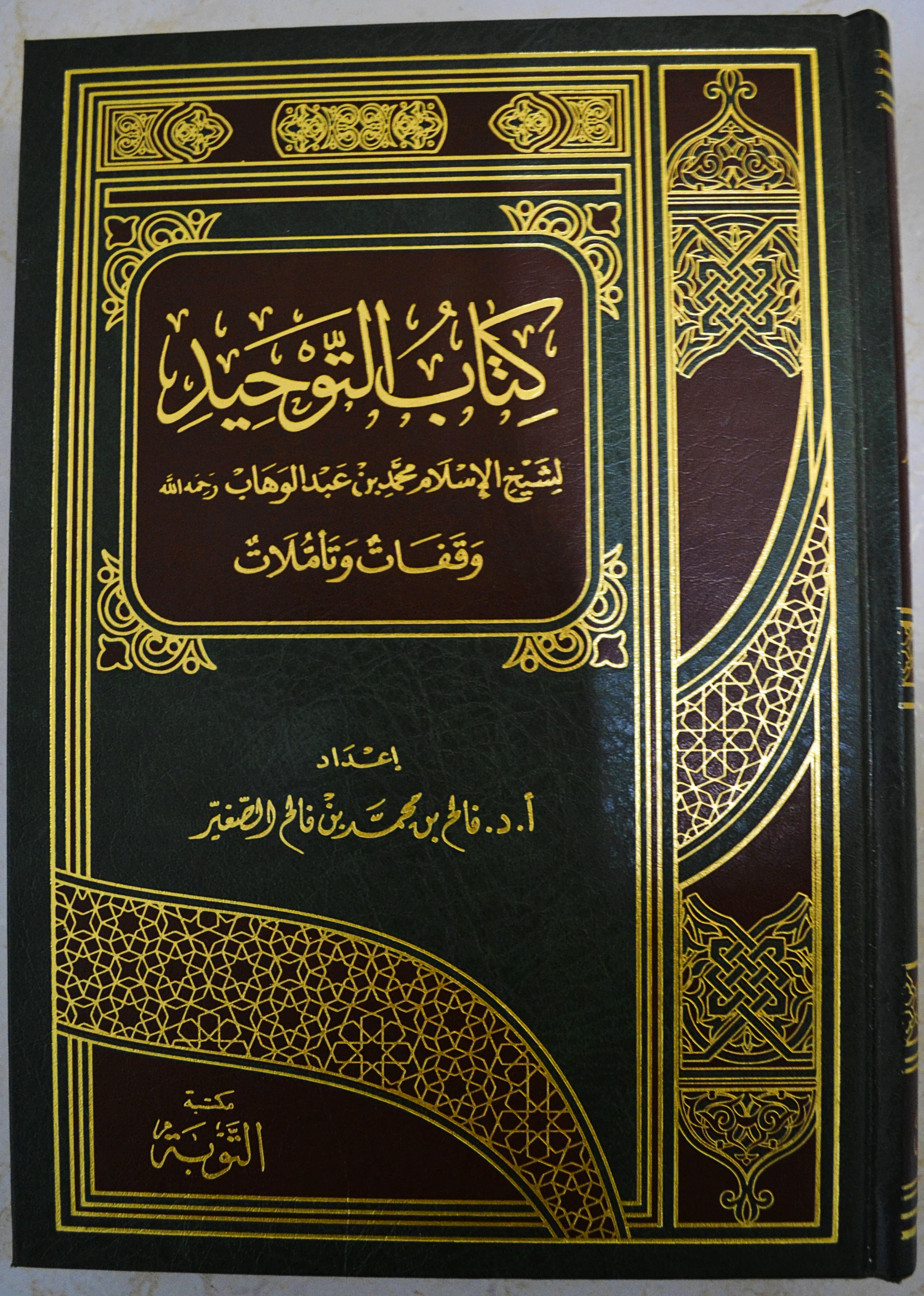
- Author: Muhammad ibn Abd al-Wahhab
- Original title: كتاب التوحيد الذي هو حق الله على العبيد
- Translators: English: Sameh Strauch; English: Dar us-Salam Publications; Bengali: Ahmed Hassan; Russian: Unknown at the moment; Filipino: Abdullah Omar Naseef
- Language: Arabic
- Subject: Islamic monotheism (Tawhid)
- Published: 1703-1791
- Publisher: Dar-us Salam Publications (English and Arabic)
- Publication place: Emirate of Diriyah (modern-day Saudi Arabia)
- ISBN: 978-6038412435
- Original text: كتاب التوحيد الذي هو حق الله على العبيد at Arabic Wikisource

Kitab al-Tawhid (Arabic: كتاب التوحيد) (Book of Monotheism) is a Sunni book about Islamic monotheism (Tawhid) in the Athari school of thought. The book is the primary source for Salafi beliefs on monotheism. The book was written by the Hanbali scholar Muhammad ibn Abd al-Wahhab.

== History ==
Following early education in Medina, Ibn ʿAbd-al-Wahhab traveled outside of the Arabian Peninsula, venturing first to Basra which was still an active center of Islamic culture. During his stay in Basra, Ibn 'Abd al-Wahhab studied Hadith and Fiqh under the Islamic scholar Muhammad al-Majmu'i. In Basra, Ibn 'Abd al-Wahhab came into contact with Shi'is and would write a treatise repudiating their theological doctrines. He also became influenced by the writings of Hanbali theologian Ibn Rajab (d. 1393 C.E/ 795 A.H) such as "Kalimat al-Ikhlas" which inspired Ibn 'Abd al-Wahhab's seminal treatise "Kitab al-Tawhid".

The treatise was banned in Russia on 16 July 2007 due to it being labelled "extremist" by the Russian government, alongside several other books of Muslim scholars, such as the Risala-i Nur Collection written by Said Nursî. Nafigullah Ashirov, chairman of the 'Spiritual Administration of Muslims of the Asian Part of Russia,' strongly condemned the ban and criticized the Russian government for fostering intolerance against Muslim literature.

== Summary ==
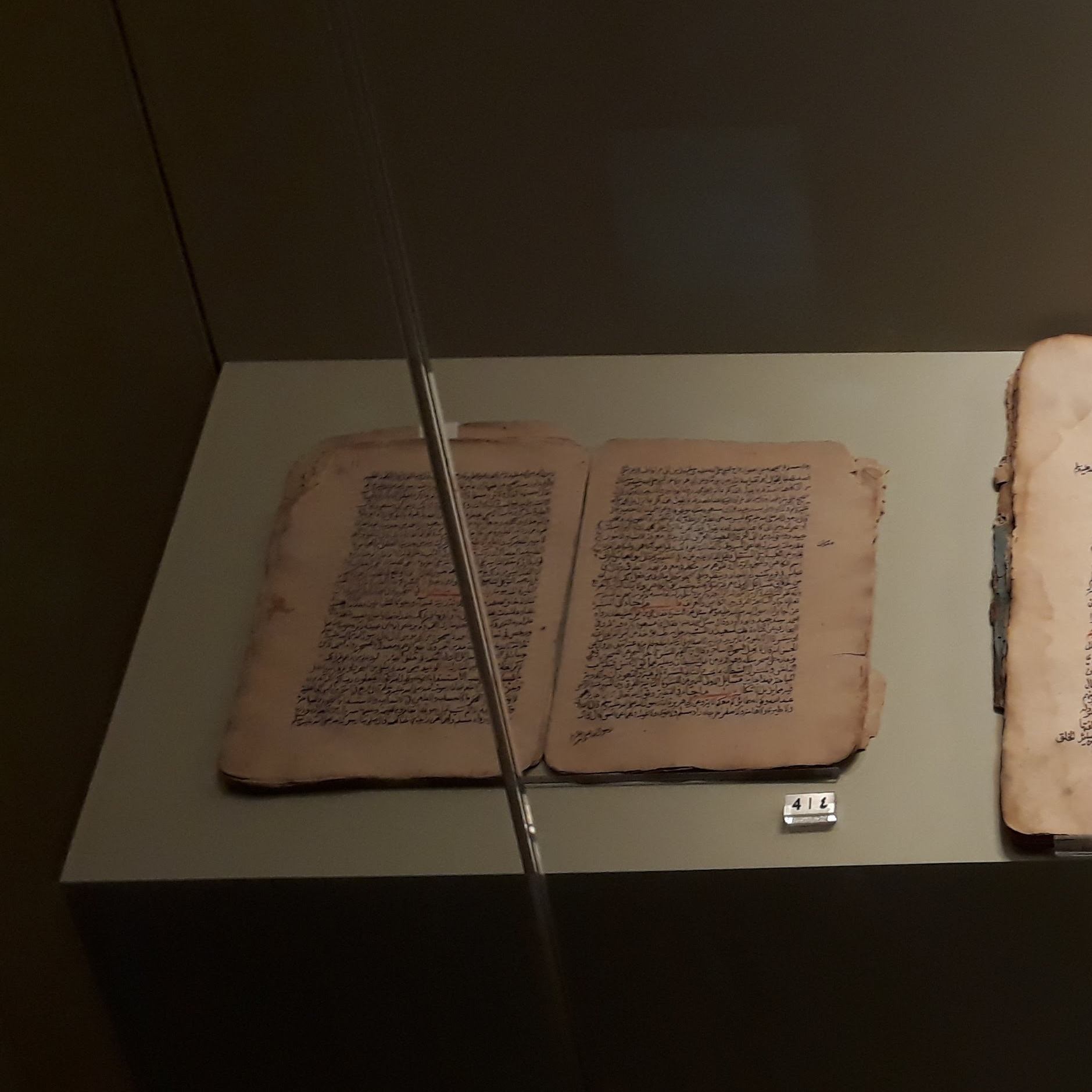
Original corpus of Kitab al-Tawhid (The Book of Monotheism) written by Muhammad Ibn 'Abd al-Wahhab on display, 2018 in National Museum of Saudi Arabia, Riyadh

The book focuses on how God is one and that God should only be worshipped alone without any middleman (called monotheism). It also disapproves of the worship of more than one God (which is called polytheism or shirk) and also refutes innovation within Islam by strictly following the Qur'an and hadith. The book also tries to show the dangers of polytheism to the reader and the punishment for polytheism in Islam. The book also condemns the use of black magic or fortune telling (both called sihr or shirk) in any form such as amulets and astrology.

Muhammad Ibn ʿAbd al-Wahhab sought to revive and purify Islam from what he perceived as non-Islamic popular religious beliefs and practices by returning to what, he believed, were the fundamental principles of the Islamic religion. His works were generally short, full of quotations from the Qur'an and Hadith, such as his main and foremost theological treatise, Kitāb at-Tawḥīd (Arabic: كتاب التوحيد; "The Book of Oneness"). He taught that the primary doctrine of Islam was the uniqueness and oneness of God (tawhid), and denounced those religious beliefs and practices widespread amongst the people of Najd. Following Ibn Taymiyya's teachings on Tawhid, Ibn 'Abd al-Wahhab believed that much of Najd had descended into superstitious folk religion akin to the period of Jahiliyya (pre-Islamic era) and denounced much of their beliefs as polytheism (shirk). He associated such practices with the culture of Taqlid (imitation to established customs) adored by pagan-cults of Jahiliyya era. Based on the doctrine of Tawhid espoused in Kitab al-Tawhid, the followers of Ibn 'Abd al-Wahhab referred themselves by the designation "Al-Muwahhidun" (Unitarians).

The "core" of Ibn ʿAbd al-Wahhab's teaching is found in Kitāb at-Tawḥīd, a theological treatise which draws from material in the Qur'an and the recorded doings and sayings of the Islamic prophet Muhammad in the Hadith literature. It preaches that worship in Islam includes conventional acts of worship such as the five daily prayers (Salat); fasting (Sawm); supplication (Dua); seeking protection or refuge (Istia'dha); seeking help (Ist'ana and Istigatha) of Allah.

According to the political scientist Dore Gold, Muhammad ibn ʿAbd al-Wahhab presented a strong anti-Christian and anti-Judaic stance in his main theological treatise Kitāb at-Tawḥīd, describing the followers of both Christian and Jewish faiths as sorcerers who believe in devil-worship, and by citing a hadith attributed to the Islamic prophet Muhammad (Note: The attribution of this hadith is disputed; according to other sources it should be attributed to 'Umar ibn al-Khattab, companion of the Islamic prophet Muhammad and second caliph of the Rashidun Caliphate.) he stated that capital punishment for the sorcerer is "that he be struck with the sword". Ibn ʿAbd al-Wahhab asserted that both the Christian and Jewish religions had improperly made the graves of their prophets into places of worship and warned Muslims not to imitate this practice. Ibn ʿAbd al-Wahhab concluded that "The ways of the People of the Book are condemned as those of polytheists."

Ibn ʿAbd al-Wahhab had believed that visiting the tomb of Muhammad was a righteous deed, referring to it as "among the best of deeds" while condemning its excesses.

== See also ==
- Salafi–Sufi relations
- 2016 international conference on Sunni Islam in Grozny
