= Kitab al-Tawhid =

Kitab al-Tawhid ('The Book of Monotheism') may refer to:

- Kitab al-Tawhid (Al-Maturidi), a 10th century CE Sunni theological book by Abu Mansur al-Maturidi
- The Book of Tawhid: The Right of Allah Upon His Servants (Kitab al-Tawhid), an 18th century CE treatise by Muhammad ibn Abd al-Wahhab
