= Riccardo Pozzo =

Italian philosopher (born 1959)

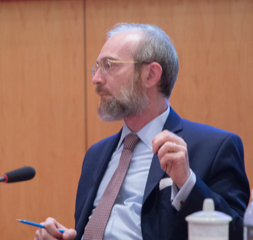
- Riccardo Pozzo in 2018
- Born: Riccardo Pozzo; June 7, 1959 (age 67); Milan, Italy
- Education: University of Milan
- Occupations: Historian of philosophy, university professor
- Writing career
- Genres: Philosophy, Lexicography, History of Ideas, Cultural Studies, Religious Studies
- Height: 5 ft 7.59 in (1.72 m)
- Notable work: History of Philosophy and the Reflective Society
- Notable awards: Order of Merit of the Federal Republic of Germany

Riccardo Pozzo (born June 7, 1959, in Milan) is an Italian philosopher and historian of philosophy.

== Biography ==
Graduated in philosophy at the University of Milan in 1983, he received his Ph.D. in 1988 at Saarland University and Habilitation in 1995 at University of Trier. In 1996 he went to the U.S. to teach Kant and Hegel at the School of Philosophy of the Catholic University of America in Washington, D.C. In 2003 he came back to Italy to take up the chair of the History of Philosophy at University of Verona.

From 2009 to 2012 he succeeded to Tullio Gregory at the direction of the Institute for the European Intellectual Lexicon and History of Ideas at the National Research Council of Italy. From 2012 to 2017 he directed the Department of Social Sciences and Humanities, Cultural Heritage of the National Research Council of Italy. In 2019 he was appointed to the chair of the History of Philosophy at University of Rome Tor Vergata. He was elected a member of the Institut International de Philosophie, the Accademia degli Agiati di Scienze, Lettere ed Arti, the Pontifical Academy of Social Sciences, the European Academy of Sciences and Arts, of the Academia Europaea and an overseas member of the International Confucian Association.

Order of Merit of the Federal Republic of Germany on ribbon, he has served as expert of the Horizon 2020 Program Committee Configuration Research Infrastructures, member of the Scientific Review Group for the Humanities of the European Science Foundation, and chairman of the 24th World Congress of Philosophy Program Committee, organized by the Fédération Internationale des Sociétés de Philosophie in Beijing 2018; and a member of the 25th World Congress of Philosophy National Organizing Committee Rome 2024.

== Research ==
Historian of philosophy and author of monographs and papera on Aristotelianism, the history of logic (from the Renaissance to Kant and Hegel), the history of Chinese philosophy, Pozzo has pushed forward the creation of research infrastructures for an enhanced comprehension of philosophical and scientific texts that have shaped the cultural heritage of mankind. Specific characteristic of Pozzo's approach to lexicography during his tenure at the Institute for the European Intellectual Lexicon and History of Ideas is the use of IT for linguistic and textual data documentation and elaboration in Ancient Greek, English, French, German, Latin, and Italian. As a member of the editorial team of the new Kant edition sponsored by the Berlin-Brandenburg Academy of Sciences and Humanities he has been in charge of twelve of Kant's published writings: Nova dilucidatio, Geschichte Erdbeben, Monadologia physica, Theorie der Winde, Entwurf Geographie, Optimismus, Spitzfindigkeit, De mundi, Racen, Menschenrace, Büchernachdruck, Buchmacherey.

== History of Philosophy and the Reflective Society ==
Like many other disciplines, today also the history of philosophy is taking a global perspective. Pozzo offers new definitions and stocktaking of best practices focused on European-Chinese cultural interactions, which can be taken as the start for extending the model to other cultures. Pozzo's research is about innovation, reflection and inclusion. Cultural innovation is something real that tops up social and technological innovation by providing the reflective society with spaces of exchange in which citizens engage in the process of sharing their experiences while appropriating common goods content. We are talking of public spaces such as universities, academies, libraries, museums, science-centres, but also of any place in which co-creation activities may occur, e.g. research infrastructures such as DARIAH-Digital Research Infrastructure for the Arts and the Humanities (http://dariah.eu). At this level, social innovation becomes reflective and generates cultural innovation.

== Social and Cultural Innovation ==
The focus is on the introduction of the notion of cultural innovation, which requires adapting the process of co-creation, as it is pivotal for the theoretical framework. Here, the dimension of cultural innovation is contrasted against other forms of innovation. Pozzo has made an unprecedented attempt in pointing out processes and outcomes of cultural innovation while showing their operationalisation in some empirical case studies. Policy implications and verification strategies result from the final proposed definition.

== Humanities-led Cross-disciplinary Migration Issues ==
Pozzo reflects on the methodological, conceptual and epistemological challenges of engaging in humanities-led cross-disciplinary research on migration. He elaborates on concrete examples as regards tackling migration as a domain that ignites a dialogue between very different disciplines such as sociology, narratology, media-studies, ICT, political science, social psychology, religious studies, economics, human rights, cultural heritage, museum studies, civil society organizations while using data available through research infrastructures, computational social science and digital humanities. Migration accompanies the whole history of civilisations, involving continuous relations and exchanges among cultures, hence translations through different linguistic, economic, political and cultural contexts. Migration offers compelling examples for the impact of cultural innovation because it implies transfers of cultures, knowledge and competencies. The epistemological challenges related to humanities-led cross-disciplinary migration issues are based on the aim of contributing to a change in the mindset as regards a culture of inclusion and reflection in target groups active in social infrastructures such as education, life-long learning, healthcare, urban development and regeneration.

== Bibliography ==
Monographs

1. History of Philosophy and the Reflective Society (De Gruyter: Berlin/Boston, 2021), DOI: https://doi.org/10.1515/9783110709292 (Open access)
2. Kant y el problema de una introducción a la lógica, transl. Javier Sánchez-Arjona Voser (Madrid: Maia, 2016), ISBN 9788492724628.
3. Adversus Ramistas: Kontroversen über die Natur der Logik am Ende der Renaissance (Basel: Schwabe, 2012), ISBN 9783796528187
4. Georg Friedrich Meiers Vernunftlehre: Eine historisch-systematische Untersuchung (Stuttgart-Bad Cannstatt: Frommann-Holzboog, 2000), ISBN 3772820239
5. Kant und das Problem einer Einleitung in die Logik: Ein Beitrag zur Rekonstruktion der historischen Hintergründe von Kants Logik-Kolleg (Frankfurt: Lang, 1989), ISBN 3631407289
6. Hegel: Introductio in Philosophiam: Dagli studi ginnasiali alla prima logica 1782-1801 (Florence: La Nuova Italia, 1989), ISBN 8822107063

Papers

1. Berlin-Brandenburgische Akademie der Wissenschaften (ed.), Kants gesammelte Schriften. Neuedition der Abtheilung I (Werke). Berlin/Boston: De Gruyter, 2023 -, 9 volumes. DOI: https://doi.org/10.1017/S1369415424000384
2. (coauthors Andrea Filippetti, Mario Paolucci, and Vania Virgili) "What Does Cultural Innovation Stand for? Dimensions, Processes, Outcomes of a New Innovation Category," Science and Public Policy, 47 (2020), #3, 425-433 (Open access), DOI: https://doi.org/10.1093/scipol/scaa023
3. "G. F. Meiers rhetorisierte Logik und die freien Künste,” Rhetorica: A Journal of the History of Rhetoric 36 (2018), #2, 160–78. ISSN: 0734–8584, DOI: https://doi.org/10.1525/rh.2018.36.2.160
4. (coauthor Vania Virgili) “Social and Cultural Innovation: Research Infrastructures Tackling Migration,” Diogenes: International Journal of Human Sciences 64 (2017), https://doi.org/10.1177/0392192117739822
5. (coauthor Vania Virgili) “Governing Cultural Diversity: Common Goods, Shared Experiences, Spaces for Exchange,” Economia della cultura: Rivista trimestrale dell’Associazione per l’Economia della Cultura 26 (2016), #1, 41–47, https://www.rivisteweb.it/doi/10.1446/84035

== Decorations ==
2014: Bundesverdienstkreuz der Bundesrepublik Deutschland am Bande
