= Ibn Ashir =

Moroccan Islamic scholar (1582–1631)

Abdul Wahid Ibn Ashir
- Title: Ibn Ashir

Personal life
- Born: 1582 CE (990 AH)
- Died: 1631 CE (1040 AH)
- Main interest: Fiqh
- Notable work: Al-Murshid al-Mu'een

Religious life
- Religion: Islam
- Jurisprudence: Sunni Maliki
- Creed: Ashari

Abd al-Wahid Ibn Ashir (1582 – 1631 CE) (AH 990 – 1040 AH ) known as Imam Ibn Ashir or simply Ibn Ashir was a Moroccan jurist in the Maliki school from Fez, Morocco. His Murshid al-Mu'een is arguably the best known of the Maliki texts in the Islamic world. It is still widely sung and memorised in madrasas and Quranic schools throughout North Africa to this day.

== See also ==
- List of Islamic scholars
- List of Ash'aris and Maturidis
