= Ibrahim al-Laqqani =

Islamic scholar and theologian

- Died: 1041 AH / 1631 CE
- Notable work(s): Jawharat al-Tawhid, Sharh al-'Aqa'id al-Nasafiyya

Religious life
- Religion: Islam
- Denomination: Sunni
- Jurisprudence: Maliki
- Creed: Ash'ari

Ibrahim al-Laqqani (Arabic: إبراهيم اللقّاني) was a mufti of Maliki law, a scholar of Hadith, a scholar of theology and author of one of the most popular didactic poems on Ash'ari theology (Jawharat al-Tawhid) which became the subject of numerous commentaries and glossaries. One such was by his son 'Abd al-Salam al-Laqani.

Al-Laqani studied under notable Hanafi, Maliki and Shafi'i scholars, but only issued fatwas in the Maliki school. He was also a professor at al-Azhar university of Cairo. and wrote on many subjects including Hadith and Arabic grammar.
