= Al-Murshid al-Mu'een =

Maliki fiqh book by Ibn Ashir

Matn Ibn Ashir
- Author: Ibn Ashir (1582 – 1631 CE)
- Original title: المرشد المعين على الضروري من علوم الدين
- Working title: متن ابن عاشر
- Language: Arabic
- Subject: Islam, Iman, Ihsan, Aqidah, Fiqh, Sufism
- Genre: Qasida, Poem

Matn Ibn Ashir or Al-Murshid al-Mu'een is a Maliki fiqh book written by Ibn Ashir (1582 – 1631 CE) for learning Islam in North Africa.

== Presentation ==
Abd al-Wahid ibn Ashir summarizes in verses the three sciences of Islam, Iman and Ihsan upon the reference of Maliki fiqh, Ash'ari aqidah and the Junaydi tariqah of tasawwuf.

This book is presented as a Qasida including a collection of the fundamentals of religion that contains 317 lines from Bahr al-Rajaz.

It is usually approached before learning Mukhtasar Khalil in the Maliki fiqh.

From the Matn Ibn Ashir, the talibe then proceeds to the Risala fiqhiya written by Ibn Abi Zayd al-Qayrawani.

This book is the shortest and best known of the Maliki texts in the Islamic world.

It is still widely recited and memorized in zawiyas, madrasas and Quranic schools throughout North Africa to this day.

== Contents ==
Ibn Ashir begins the poem with five verses in which he mentions what he intended to compose, and he started it when he made it in Hajj, then when he completed his Hajj, he completed what related to the five rules of Islam.

This introduction was followed by a doctrinal introduction, in which he explained the Ash'ari belief and the Five Pillars of Islam within the limits of 42 verses, then followed by another introduction to the Principles of Islamic jurisprudence in 6 verses in which he explained the legal ruling, its divisions and conditions.

Then the provisions of purity including ghusl, wudu and tayammum in 45 verses in which he explains the obligations, Sunnahs and negatives of ablution, the rituals of ablution, its delegates, its obligations, and the rulings of tayammum.

Then he organized the rules of Salah and what is related to it within the limits of 85 verses in which he mentioned its obligations, conditions, Sunnah prayers, delegates and dislikes, the rulings of the Adhan and Salah al-Musafir.

Then he mentioned the five obligatory prayers and the Sunnah and recommended prayers, the rulings for the Sujud Sahwi and the Friday prayer and the conditions of the imam, then the rulings of Zakat, its types and its disbursements in 29 verses.

Then the rulings of Fasting, it's obligatory and desirable in 18 verses, then the rulings of Hajj and Umrah in 62 verses, then he concluded his poem with Sufism and his principles in 27 verses in accordance with the Tariqa of Imam Junayd of Baghdad regarding Tawba and Istighfar, cessation of incest, cleansing of the qalb of evil, and Muhasabah.
