= Morality in Islam =

Norms and codes for moral behavior in Islam

In Islam, morality in the sense of "non practical guidelines" or "specific norms or codes of behavior" for good doing (as opposed to ethical theory) are primarily based on the Quran and the Hadith – the central religious texts of Islam – and also mostly "commonly known moral virtues" whose major points "most religions largely agree on". They include kindness (to people and animals), charity, forgiveness, honesty, patience, justice, respecting parents and elders, keeping promises, and controlling one's anger, love of God and those God loves, love of his messenger (Muhammad) and of believers.

The "basic aim" of Islamic morality and ethics is "to achieve" Raza-e Ilahi (the Pleasure of God)" or to make God's pleasure "the objective of man’s life"; and the importance of moral behavior in this is reflected in the five Quranic verses calling on Muslims to 'enjoin what is right and forbid what is wrong', and hadith that quote Muhammad as saying 'I was sent to perfect the ethical conduct'.

== Terminology ==
Terms associated with right-doing in Islam include:

- Akhlaq (Arabic: أخلاق) is the practice of virtue, morality and manners in Islamic theology and falsafah (philosophy). The science of ethics (`Ilm al-Akhlaq) teaches that through practice and conscious effort man can surpass their natural dispositions and natural state (Fitrah) to become more ethical and well mannered. In the social sciences Akhlaq is a kind of normative ethical systems known as "virtue ethics", which is based on "virtues, or moral character", rather than "conceptions of the right (as in Kantian ethics) or the good (as in utilitarianism)".
- Al-Adāb (Arabic: الﺁداب), has been defined as "decency, morals".
- Iḥsān (Arabic: إحسان), is an Arabic term meaning "beautification", "perfection" or "excellence", but in Islam it is also defined (by Malcolm Clark) as ethics/morality "literally virtue, including right living," and (according to Ruqaiyyah Waris Maqsood) is a matter of taking one's inner faith and showing it in both deed and action.

=== Difference between Akhlaq and morality in Islam ===
According to Juan E. Campo, editor of Encyclopedia of Islam,

Ethics means philosophical reflection upon moral conduct, while morality pertains to specific norms or codes of behavior. Questions of ethics, therefore, involve such subjects as human nature and the capacity to do good, the nature of good and evil, motivations for moral action, the underlying principles governing moral and immoral acts, deciding who is obliged to adhere to the moral code and who is exempted from it, and the implications of either adhering to the moral code or violating it. Morality encompasses the values and rules that govern human conduct …

Similarly, Malcolm Clark says, "... some Western ethicists make a distinction between ethics (theory) and morals (practical guidelines) ..." (Note: This distinction differs with other sources that describe: ethics as "rules provided by an external source, e.g., codes of conduct in workplaces or principles in religions" and; Morals as "an individual’s own principles regarding right and wrong".; or 'Many people think of: morality as something that’s personal and normative, whereas; ethics is the standards of “good and bad” distinguished by a certain community or social setting.')

== Scriptural sources ==
According to Nikhat Sattar, "Islamic ethics differ from the Western concept" in being based on divine revelation.

=== Quran ===
The Quran, which Muslims believe is God's revelation to humanity, declares "righteousness" to include (besides specific religious beliefs such as believing in Allah, the Day of Judgement, Prophets, Angels, etc.), the spending of "your substance, ... for your kin, for orphans, for the needy, for the wayfarer, for those who ask, and for the freeing of captives; ... practice regular charity; to fulfill the contracts which you made; and to be firm and patient in pain and adversity and throughout all periods of panic" (Q.2:177); to be "active in deeds of charity; who abstain from sex except with their wives, or whom their right hands possess. ... [to] faithfully observe their trusts and covenants ...." (Q.23.3-11)

According to a reading of the Surah 17, "Al-Israa" ("The Night Journey"), verses 17:22-39, by academic S. A. Nigosian, a set of moral stipulations that can be reasonably categorised as ten in number, and written to resemble the Ten Commandments in the Bible. Nigosian alleges this "represents the fullest statement of the code of behavior every Muslim must follow", although Islamic scholars have not set apart these verses from any other moral stipulations in the Qur'an, nor are they regarded as a substitute, replacement, or abrogation of some other set of commandments as found in the previous revelations.

1. "Worship only God," (17:22);
2. "Be kind, honourable and humble to one's parents," (17:23-24);
3. "Be neither miserly nor wasteful," (17:26-29);
4. "Do not engage in 'mercy killings' for fear of starvation," God will provide. (17:31);
5. "Do not commit adultery," (17:32);
6. "Do not kill unjustly," (17:33);
7. "Care for orphaned children,"(17:34);
8. "Keep one's promises:" (17:34);
9. "Be honest and fair in one's interactions," (17:35);
10. "Do not be arrogant in one's claims or beliefs," (17:36-37).

Many Muslim theologians see the "Golden Rule" implicit in some verses of the Qur'an and in the Hadith. The Golden Rule was agreed 1993 also by Muslims as a central unconditional ethical norm in the Declaration Toward a Global Ethic.

=== Hadith ===
Hadith, "the other major source of Islamic moral wisdom," is based on reports of the teachings, deeds and sayings, of the Islamic prophet Muhammad. It is the basis of the Sunnah, which Muslims consider "to be a body of norms that should be followed in worship and in everyday life", and whose collections have

"chapters about the virtues that he embodied. There included respect for parents and elders, maintaining strong family ties, being good to neighbors, caring for children, avoiding abuse of servants and slaves ... being well-mannered, offering hospitality to guests, visiting sick, showing mercy to animals, being patient and sincere, greeting people correctly, asking permission before entering a house, dressing modestly, and avoiding lying and rude speech."

One hadith reports Muhammad saying, "'I was sent to perfect the ethical conduct'." (Muwatta Malik) They state that the one with the best or most complete faith “is the one who is the best in conduct, and the most kind to his family" (Jami al-Tirmidhi).

Muhammad reportedly said, "The best among you are those who have the best manners and character" (Sahih al-Bukhari, 8:73:56).

In the well known "Hadith of jibril", the angel Jibril (Gabriel) questions Muhammad about "what is faith?" "what is Islam?" and "what is Ihsan?" (The last being defined variously as perfection or virtue, ethics, "including right living".) Muhammad then describes Ihsan as

- "To worship Allah as if you see Him, and if you cannot achieve this state of devotion then you must consider that He is looking at you."

=== Other literature ===
Besides the Quran and hadith, there are a number of other sources, (not all universally followed in Islam):

- the works of Islamic scholars and philosophers;
- Arabic virtues that predate Islam, (such as "honor, courage, loyalty, hospitality, self-control", etc.);
- the moral examples set by important Islamic personalities (such as the four rightly guided caliphs for Sunni Muslims);
- works on Adab (i.e. etiquette, manners);
- "philosophical reflection" by the school of Islam known as the Mu`tazilites and others;
- "works of Greek ethicists", (which were translated into Arabic);
- the 99 names of God, which among other qualities/attributes include names based on virtues -- "the gentle, the grateful, the just, the giver, the equitable, the loving", etc.;
- ethical values from Sufism "including humility and poverty".

== General principles ==
While the "Hadith of jibril" (see above), includes virtue (called Ihsan) along with faith (Iman) and religious practice (called Islam) — the three are sometimes called the "three dimensions" or "three levels" of Islam — there is not a concise set of points for virtue/morality (no Ten Commandments), as there is for religious practice (the Five Pillars of ritual declaration of faith, prayer, almsgiving, fasting, and pilgrimage), or faith (the Six Articles of the oneness of God, angels, prophets, the Torah, Bible and Quran, predestination, and Judgement Day). In addition, sections analyzing morality/ethics in works of Islamic philosophy are usually quite "slim" according to Oliver Leaman.

However, the Quran is clear about the importance of Muslims taking action to "enjoin what is good and forbid what is wrong". Quranic verses 3:104, 3:110, 9:71, 9:112, 5:105, 31:17 all contain some variation of that phrase. A famous hadith quotes the Islamic prophet Muhammad as saying:

- "Whoever amongst you sees an evil, he must change it with his hand. If he is not able to do so, then with his tongue. And if he is not able to do so, then with his heart, and that is the weakest form of faith".

(Mutazilite and Shia Imamis quote different traditions than this Sunni Hadith, but all agree on the Quran and on "the existence of the duty" to command and forbid.)

In regards to the basis of Islamic morality/ethics, etc. (in fact the basis of the meaning of life), at least a couple of sources have proclaimed it to be "God’s pleasure" or the "worship [of] God". (Note: The Religion of Islam" website "Moral System of Islam" page states that Islam sets "God’s pleasure as the objective of man’s life," The "Why Islam?" website "Morality & Ethics in Islam" page states, "the purpose of human life is to worship God".)

Islamic secondary sources and later Islamic scholarly works have made detailed discussions and laid down detailed instructions on moral issues. However, in popular works on Islam some general principles of morality have been offered. Often, teachings calling for leniency, universality and courtesy are emphasized. The Religion of Islam website states that whatever is good and beneficial for mankind is morally good, and vice versa. According to Islamic sharia, a Muslim is expected to display good manners as bad manners earn vices. Muhammad is reported as saying "It is not possible that you indulge in rebuking and reviling and remain righteous at the same time".

Some principles/conditions of Islamic ethics/morality offered by writers on the subject are

- Muslims should call on everyone to do what is good and should forbid what is evil (Malcolm Clark);
- Moral actions are defined as those that result in justice (Malcolm Clark), following God's law (Nikhat Sattar);
- Both faith and good works are needed to go to heaven (jannah) (Malcolm Clark), Faith is incomplete without a sense of morality (Al-Ghazali), Salat prayers offered that do not prevent wrongdoings are worthless;
- Insincere good deeds are not enough. Intentions must be good (Malcolm Clark), (Nikhat Sattar);
- Good character, strong moral values (wisdom, modesty, concern for justice, absence of greed, lust, etc.) must be cultivated (Malcolm Clark), (Al-Ghazali);
- Extremes should be avoided, balance sought after (Malcolm Clark).

The pursuit of (most) moral qualities is not a religious obligation (fard) in Islam, but supererogatory or voluntary (its category of Ahkam is known as mustaḥabb/mandūb); and seen as the key to attaining the nearness of God.

== Emphasis on good character ==
Character—the assemblage of qualities that distinguish one individual from another—may be good or bad, innate or acquired. The canonical texts of Islam promote the idea of good character. The Quran describes Muhammad as 'an excellent example' (Q33:21, this verse is one of the bases of the religious importance of hadith and sunnah), and also as having 'exalted quality of character' (Q68:4). Thus his high quality character is an example to be imitated and cultivated by Muslims.

There are may other sayings of Muhammad that highlight the importance of character that possesses good moral qualities, including:

- I have been sent for the perfection of character (reported by Abu Hurayrah, from Imam Ahmad and Bayhaqi).
- The one with good morals and character already owns the best of this world and the Hereafter (reported by Anas ibn Malik, from Tabarani and Abu Dawud).
- A person reaches the best and most honored levels in the Hereafter as a result of good character.... And bad character condemns a person to the lowest depths of Hell (reported by Anas ibn Malik, from Tabarani).
- One can repent for any sin but bad character – because with bad character, before a person can attempt to ask forgiveness for one sin, he commits a worse (from Tabarani, Isfahani).

Early Islamic moralists concluded that with conscious practice character could be changed to a certain degree. Medieval Islamic scholar Al-Isfahani (d. 1108/1109) believed that purification of soul meant the control, not the elimination, of desires. Muhammad Birgivi, a 16th-century Muslim scholar and moralist, wrote that 'To cure yourself of a bad feature of character is an obligation'; and believed that continuous practice of moral virtues and a conscious effort to internalize those qualities can lead to the formation of a morally good character. He taught that changing of character depends on such things as 'a person's wish' and 'the strength of one's understanding'; and that the preservation of good character required avoiding of the company of those who indulge in indecent activities, such as drunkenness and meaningless gossip.

== Virtues ==
Many virtues/good character traits/moral qualities such as kindness (to people and animals), charity, forgiveness, honesty, patience, justice, respecting parents and elders, keeping promises, and controlling one's anger, are commanded or encouraged in verses in the Quran and hadith. (The heading of "Morality" in The Qur'an: an encyclopedia by Oliver Leaman, includes subheadings of numerous virtues/moral qualities -- "Goodness (khayr) and Righteousness (birr)", "Justice and responsibility", etc. -- and discussion of other qualities -- hilm, (which means forbearance, self-mastery, etc.). According to Miskawayh (932–1030 CE, chancery official of the Buyid era, and Islamic philosopher and historian), "the four cardinal virtues" were "wisdom, courage, temperance and justice".

=== Justice ===
To render justice ranks as the most noble of acts of devotion next to belief in God. It is the greatest of all the duties entrusted to the prophets…and it is the strongest justification for man’s stewardship of earth.

— Shams al-Din Sarkhasi

According to Majid Khadduri, the Quran warns people against injustice in an estimated 200 places, and directs people to establishing justice in another 100. It uses the words qist, qast, wasat, and mizan and especially adl, in referring to justice. It is not only a moral virtue but also an obligation to be fulfilled under all circumstances, According to Oliver Leaman, "justice is a supreme virtue in Islam to the extent that it stands in order of priority after belief in the Oneness of God and the truth of the Prophet." The Quranic injunction of fairness and fair dealing is equally applicable to all people, irrespective of caste, creed, and color.

=== Charity ===
Numerous verses of the Quran and the sayings of Muhammad tell the Muslims to be generous to the needy, to one's kinsmen and neighbors, and that this will earn God's mercy and reward in the afterlife. Verses in the Quran declare that the righteous are those people who fulfill their promises, and feed the needy, the orphans and the captive for the love of God (76:5-8); and that "those who (in charity) spend their goods by night and by day, in secret and in public have their reward with their Lord; on them shall be no fear, nor shall they grieve" (2:274).

In a seerah (Prophetic biography), Muhammed says:

O Aisha, Never turn away any needy man from your door empty-handed. Love the poor; bring them near to you and God will bring you near to Him on the Day of Resurrection.

In a Sahih Muslim hadith, Jarir narrates how at the appearance of some starving people, Muhammad assembled Muslims and proclaimed, "Everyone should give in charity dinar, dirham, cloth, dates, wheat", and "give, even if it is a stone of a date."

Miserliness is discouraged in Islam, and the hoarding of wealth is punished in the afterlife. Helping people in time of their needs is seen as more important than praying in the mosque.

=== Forgiveness ===
The virtue of forgiveness (ʿafwu or pardon) is much celebrated in both the Quran and the Sunnah. Forgiveness can be God's forgiveness for human beings for their sins, or forgiveness among fellow human beings for each other. In the first instance, human beings have been asked to seek God's forgiveness for their sins, for which they are promised mercy and forgiveness. In the second instance, human beings have been encouraged to forgive a person who has done moral offense, and not to be cruel to him is seen as a noble virtue. This does not involve denying or underplaying the moral injury suffered by the victim; rather it involves a positive change in mentality toward the offender. Thus, an act of forgiveness means rising above one's self-interest or narrow-mindedness, and achieving nobler quality of heart. Those who forgive are promised reward by God.

In a frequently quoted hadith, Muhammad is reported as saying: 'the best deeds before God are to pardon a person who has wronged you, to show affection for relatives who have broken ties with you, and to act generously towards a person who has deprived you.' S.A. Nigosian cites a teaching that when an offender is brought to justice, imposing a penalty on them in proportion to their offense is permissible and just; but forgiving them is better still, and going one step further by offering a favor to the offender is regarded as the highest excellence.

=== Tolerance ===
Islamic teaching and law calls for tolerance to be cultivated at personal, familial, social, and religious levels. It is the teaching of Islam that when faced with ill-treatment by any unwise person, a sensible person should not be provoked to seek vengeance, but be tolerant. During the initial years of Islam, Muslims faced persecutions by the Meccan pagans. After its introduction in 610 CE, Islam sought to moderate the qualities of vengeance and violence prevalent among the people of pre-Islamic Arabia, with the practice of tolerance and other virtues. During this period, Muhammad was once asked by his companions to invoke God's wrath on the persecutors. Muhammad became displeased with such a request and advised them to be more tolerant. Once a Bedouin became discontented and expressed his dissatisfaction even after receiving gifts from Muhammad. Muhammad understood his nature, showed tolerance to him, and satisfied him with more gifts, thus paving the way for the Bedouin to take lesson from this. In the History of Islam, Abdullah ibn Ubayy was known as the "leader of the hypocrites". The activities of the hypocrites were condemned by several verses in the Quran. After Ubayy's death, at his son's request, Muhammad offered his own shirt as Ubayy's shroud. At his son's second request, Muhammad even led his funeral prayer. When Umar objected about this, Muhammad said: "If I knew that Allah will pardon Ubayy if I pray for his forgiveness more than seventy times, I would even do that."

On social and state levels, the importance of tolerance comes from the fact that it is related to such greater issues as peace and justice which are said to be the desired goal of Islam. Given that diversity is a natural phenomenon in this world, the Quran puts much emphasis on the observance of tolerance in order to maintain peace and security. In 49:13, the Quran recognizes the diversity among people: 'O mankind! We created you from a single (pair) of a male and a female, and made you into nations and tribes, that ye may know each other (not that ye may despise each other). Verily the most honoured of you in the sight of Allah is (he who is) the most righteous of you.' By mentioning the common origin of mankind, the Quran reminds them of their relating to each other, and urges them to 'rise above' the racial and national divisions. In a nutshell, it is the teaching of Islam that the diversity or difference in social, cultural, political, financial or religious spheres are to be accepted by members of communities to secure a peaceful co-existence. No forceful conversion is recognized in Islam. According to Islamic jurists, forced conversion is not possible in Islam because faith basically relates to heart, and not so much to external affairs.

=== Kindness and leniency ===
The Quran and the hadith describe God as being kind and merciful to His creatures, and tell people to be kind likewise. Among the 99 Names of God in Islam, the most common and famous are "the Compassionate" (al-raḥmān) and "the Merciful" (al-raḥīm). The Quran says, "Verily, Allah is kind and merciful to the people" (2:143). Numerous sayings of Muhammad tell the Muslims to be kind and merciful to the creatures of God. In Sahih Bukhari, it is said "He who is not merciful to others, will not be treated mercifully (by God)" (Sahih al-Bukhari, 8:73:42). Narrated in Sahih Muslim, Muhammad said, "Verily, Allah is mild and is fond of mildness, and He gives to the mild what He does not give to the harsh" (Sahih Muslim, 32:6273). He also said, "He who is deprived of kindness is in fact deprived of goodness (Sahih Muslim, 32:6272).

Muhammad has been described as being kind and compassionate to people and animals. Biographies of Muhammad record incidences showing his kindness and leniency to others. Once, a man came to him and said that he had committed a certain sin. As reparation for his sin, Muhammad asked the man if he could free a slave upon which the man expressed his inability. Muhammad asked him if he could fast for two months upon which the man replied in the negative. Muhammad asked him again if he could feed sixty poor men upon which the man replied that he was even unable to do that. In the meantime, a bag of dates was brought there as gift for Muhammad. Muhammad gave the bag of dates to the man and told him to distribute the dates among the poor as reparation. The man passionately said "who is poorer than me in Medina?" Hearing this, Muhammad smiled and told the man to distribute the dates among his own family members.

=== Kind treatment to animals ===
Islam has prescribed kind treatment not only to humans but also to animals. Prophet Muhammad was probably the first in history to talk about the rights and proper treatment of animals. Kind and humane treatment earn virtue, and can even be a means of salvation. Similarly, cruelty towards animals can lead to punishment by God. Islamic tradition narrates the story of a man who got salvation for showing mercy to a thirsty dog. On one occasion, the man saw a dog which was about to die because of extreme thirst. He realized its plight, went down into a well, brought some water for the dog, and saved its life. God became pleased with him and pardoned all his previous sins (Sahih al-Bukhari, 8:73:38). It also narrates the story of a woman who locked up a cat. She neither fed the cat nor set it free to feed for itself. For her cruelty, she was punished by God. The early rulers in Islamic world used to instruct people in behaving properly to the animals.

For proper treatment of animals, Islam has specified some guidelines:

- All pet and farm animals have the rights of proper food and shelter. The owner has the obligation to arrange for food and shelter for his animals.
- Animals which are used to carry goods should not be over-loaded.
- Animals must not be tortured, beaten, or hurt unnecessarily. They are not to be killed for recreation. Also, the body parts of any live animal must not be mutilated.
- Islam has prohibited the old custom of setting live animals or birds as targets for shooting practices.
- Prophet Muhammad has forbidden separating the birds from their off-springs.
- Animal slaughtering process should be such which is the least painful to the animal. Slaughtering of one animal in front of another is prohibited in Islam.

=== Chastity and modesty ===
The topic of chastity is mentioned 13 times in the Quran. Sharia (Islamic law) commands Muslims to preserve chastity and modesty is a principal means of doing so. Muhammad is narrated as saying:

- "Every religion has its characteristic, and the characteristic of Islam is modesty (Haya)," (collected in al-Muwatta, and
- "Modesty is part of faith" (Sahih al-Bukhari, 8:73:139).

Ibn Al-Qayyim writes, “Adultery combines all evils: it weakens faith, uproots religious prudence, corrupts nobility and wipes out jealousy". Sharia orders Muslims to lower their gaze, women to wear hijab to avoid exposing their beauty, get married at an early age, and sets "a severe punishment for adultery". One conservative Salafi fatwa website (IslamQA) talks of "zina of the eyes" being forbidden (zina being normally defined as adultery), quoting a hadith: “Allah has decreed for every son of Adam his share of zina, which he will inevitably commit. The zina of the eyes is looking, the zina of the tongue is speaking, one may wish and desire, and the private parts confirm that or deny it.” (Narrated by al-Bukhaari, 5889; Muslim, 2657).

Modesty is to be maintained in public, which is generally related to people; as well as in private, where a Muslim is expected to feel shy in front of God, (and this shyness will prevent him from disobeying God). Modesty is seen as a human trait that distinguishes human beings from other animals. Muhammad has been described as being more bashful than a maiden.

Modesty in dressing. According to Islamic Law, known as sharia, Muslims are required to cover their body parts with proper dressing. Covering everything from 'navel to knee' is mandatory for men. In some Muslim societies, women wear the niqab, a veil that covers the whole face except the eyes, or the full burqa, a full-body covering garment that occasionally does cover the eyes. Following is the most frequently cited verse of the Quran regarding modesty: "Tell the believing men to lower their gaze and be modest. That is purer for them. God is Aware of what they do. And tell the believing women to lower their gaze and be modest, and to display of their adornment only that which is apparent, and to draw their veils over their chests, and not to reveal their adornment" (24:30-1).

=== Humility ===
Humility (tawaduʿ) is defined as being modest and respectful. Accepting less than you deserve. It is not the same as servility. (Q.65:43; Q.20:108) In the Quran, God asks, "Is not there in hell a resting pace for the arrogant?" (Q.39:60) The prophetic narrations and Muhammad's own examples of simplicity and humbleness inspire the Muslims to practice humility in their life. According to tradition, Muhammad was rare to engage in argument with others. He was rare to laugh in a loud voice; rather, he preferred soft smiling. During the conquest of Mecca, when Muhammad was entering into the city riding on a camel, his head lowered, in gratitude to God, to the extent that it almost touched the back of the camel.

=== Patience and anger management ===
Numerous verses have good things to say about patience—Q.3:200, 32:24, 8:46, 3:125, 42:43, 3.146. Islamic tradition holds that God has made this world a testing ground for mankind, especially for the believers, and that the sincerity and strength of their faith will be judged through various trials, and only those who can prove their faith and can remain grateful to God despite those adversaries will earn His blessings. Patience is one of the moral qualities which Islamic sharia considers necessary for a Muslim in order to keep away from evildoings, and in a broader sense, to protect his faith. In Islamic theology, the solution to any crisis in a Muslim's life lies in two things: prayer and patience (Quran 2:153), and Muslims have been asked to seek God's help through these two things.

Management/control of anger is an important issue in Islamic tradition, as anger weakens human conscience and is the cause of many evil and violent activities. Forbearance (al-hilm), or management of "the soul and temper when it is aroused to anger", is done (according to Al-Raghib al-Isfahani d.1108/1109) by restraining one's hands from violence, the tongue from indecency, the ears from eavesdropping and the eyes from excessive gazes.

Anger is considered one of the characteristic features of pre-Islamic period – a period known as age of ignorance. "Those who curb their anger and those who pardon their fellow-men. Allah loves the beneficent" (Q.3.134) A hadith in Tirmizi says, "Adam's sons have been created of different types. … the best people among these are those who get angry late and immediately repent." In a famous hadith Narrated Abu Huraira, Muhammad said "The strong is not the one who overcomes the people by his strength, but the strong is the one who controls himself while in anger" (Sahih al-Bukhari, 8:73:135). Controlling anger is seen as a virtue and a sign of righteous person. Muhammad is reported as suggesting several methods to assuage anger for a man when he gets angry: to sit down if he is standing, and/or to lie down if he is sitting; to perform ablution (Islamic way of washing hands and face); to seek refuge from God against the influence of Satan.

=== Respect for elders ===
The family and the social tradition in Islamic world has long fostered the idea of respecting the elders of family and society. Particularly to parents, "And We have ordained on man to be good and dutiful to his parents" (Q.29:8). Elders are generally honored by the young members as part of both Islamic culture and religious duty. It is one of the important Islamic good manners found in Islamic world. Examples of respecting elders include, among others, not walking ahead of the elders, allowing them to talk first in meetings, avoiding argument with them, and not raising voice before them. Prophetic tradition narrates that 'he who does not love the younger and does not respect the elders is not one of us' (Sunan al-Tirmidhi). Anas ibn Malik narrates that Muhammad said, 'If a young man honors an elderly on account of his age, Allah appoints someone to honor him in his old age' (Sunan al-Tirmidhi).

Islamic traditions generally do not separate the older into old homes, rather accommodate them into their own houses. They are also respected as the guardian of the house. Among the elderly members of a family, the parents occupy a special position in case of receiving veneration by their children. With regard to the rights of parents, the Quranic injunction is to behave well with them, to take care of them especially in their old age, not to be rude to them, and to show highest respect to them.

=== Decent speech ===
Islam has instructed its followers to maintain decency in speech, and misuse of tongue has been admonished. Excessive or absurd talking, or useless gossiping are generally discouraged. The person who talks too much is seen as having greater chances of making mistakes. Speech that hurts others' feelings or insults people are prohibited. Similarly, calling someone by any name that harms the honor of the person is prohibited. Decent and gentle speech has been encouraged as it is seen both as a virtue and as a means of cultivating goodness among people. Muhammad has preferred maintaining silence than engaging in meaningless talks. Polemics in speech or heated arguments with ignorant people are disapproved of in Islam. In The Quran and the hadith, there are many instructions regarding the decent use of tongue. Some of them are:

- "The faith of a man cannot be straight unless his heart is straight, and his heart cannot be straight unless his tongue becomes straight." (Musnad Ahmad)
- "The faltering of the feet cause much less harm than the faltering of the tongue." (Baihaqui)
- Muhammad Ali once advised Abu Zar in this way: "Adopt silence. This is a way of causing Satan to run away, it is a support to you in the matter of your religion." (Musnad Ahmad)
- "Before Allah the most hated are the quarrelsome person" (Sahih al-Bukhari, 3:43:637).
- “Successful indeed are the believers who are humble in their prayers, and who shun vain conversation, and who are active in deeds of charity." (Quran 23:1-4)
- "Say to My servants that they should say those things that are best. Verily, Satan sows discord among them. Verily, the Satan is for man an open enemy." (Quran 17:53)
- “A kind word with forgiveness is better than charity followed by injury. Allah is Free of All Wants and Most Forbearing." (Quran 2:263)
- "And argue not with the People of the Book unless it be in a better manner than that." (Quran 29:46)

=== Honesty ===
In Islam, honesty (sidq) in the broadest sense, touches almost all aspects of human life:

- speaking truth;
- fulfilling commitments, whether written or verbal;
- remaining truthful to one's word;
- rendering the assigned duty sincerely and as meticulously as possible;
- imparting everyone's due rights without the person's asking for it;
- being objective in evaluating any case and giving judgments;
- avoiding falsehood, deception, and favoritism.

Selection and promotion of personnel in an organization based on merit and not on favoritism is also a part of honesty. In Islam, honesty should be maintained in private as well as in public; not only when supervised, but when unsupervised.

Honesty in business

Honesty has particularly been emphasized in business transactions, not only in selling and buying but in issues like pricing and advertising policies. Correct measurement is to be maintained. Again, Muhammad has instructed that the sellers should put the commodities of poorer quality in clear display so that the customers are not deceived. Hiking the price to gain more profit or lowering the price to put the competitors at trouble are considered unethical. Similarly, exaggerated claims and suppression of unfavorable information in advertising are discouraged. Honesty is regarded by Muslim scholars as one of the five essential qualities for any Muslim accountants.

Unlike most virtues, honesty is also a religious obligation, and dishonesty is Fasiq (a departure from religion), one of the major sins in Islam. Muhammad was asked whether a Muslim could be a coward. He answered: 'Yes.' He was asked whether a Muslim could be a miser. He answered: 'Yes.' He was again asked: 'Can a Muslim be a liar?' He replied: 'No.' Falsehood is seen as something which is against the general characteristics of human nature: it corrupts the human soul and paves the way for many other evil activities. According to the Quran, truthfulness was a characteristic virtue of the prophets (Quran 12:46; 19:41; 19:54; 19:56; 5:75).

according to Al-Ghazali:

- Untruth in jokes, or making up stories to amuse others is highly discouraged.
- Telling lies to even children is prohibited. Prophetic tradition narrates that "Anybody who called a child saying that he would give him a certain thing, and did not give it, then it is a lie" (Ahmed). Children should be accustomed to truthfulness from their childhood so that they can grow up with this virtue.
- Inventing falsehood and false story about God and His messengers, or inventing any false element in religion is seen as a grave sin.
- Flattery, exaggeration in praising someone is prohibited. Exaggerated praising of any powerful of rich person in order to get illegal advantage falls into this category. Praise should be made to the extent a person knows about someone. Abu Hurairah narrates that "the Prophet has commanded us that we should throw dust in the face of those who indulge in exaggeration in their praises" (Tirmizi).
- Giving false evidence against someone is seen as the worst type of falsehood, and is considered a major sin in Islam. A person is required to maintain truth in giving evidence even if that goes against their own interest.
- Bringing false charge of adultery against any woman is a punishable act in Islamic law which orders to flog the accuser eighty lashes.

==== Fulfilment of promise and trustworthiness ====
According to Islamic tradition, all human beings—non-Muslims and Muslim—made a promise to accept Allah as the true God and follow His commands in all sphere of life, before they were even born, making obedience to the laws of Islam the fulfilment of a promise made by everyone. Tradition holds that before creating humans in this world, Allah assembled their souls and asked them if He was not their Lord, upon which all replied in the affirmative. This created a covenant by all humanity to worship and obey Allah.

Both the Quran and the hadith have attached importance to respect a contract once it has been made, and whether the other party is a Muslim or non-Muslim. A number of verses in the Quran mention upholding of promises:

- .... and fulfill (every) engagement, for (every) engagement will be enquired into (on the Day of Reckoning). " (Qur’an, 17:34)

Surah 23 starts by listing the good qualities of believers including:

- Those who faithfully observe their trusts and their covenants” (Qur’an, 23:8)

One of the qualities of the righteous listed in Surah Al-Baqarah is that they

- ... keep the pledges they make ..." (Q.2:177)

In Islamic sharia, fulfilling a contract is regarded as compulsory

- ...Honour ˹your˺ pledges, for you will surely be accountable for them. (Q.17:34)

The famous hadith says

- "Three are the signs of a hypocrite, even if he observed fast and prayed and asserted that he was a Muslim: when he spoke he told a lie, when he made promise he acted treacherously, and when he was trusted he betrayed" (Sahih Muslim, 1:113).

Business contracts and words are not to be breached in pursuance of more profits. Similarly, admonition has been issued against the non-payment of loans as it is said to ruin the afterlife of a believer.

Again, in case of Muslim marriage, full payment of Mahr – the amount of money which a bridegroom needs to pay to the bride at the time of their marriage – has been emphasized. Non-payment, partial payment, or manipulation of mahr (jointure) is seen as the disruption of marriage contract."

Trustworthiness, which is connected to fulfilling assigned responsibilities properly, has a wide field of application in Islam and conveys a wide range of meaning. Islam has made every person responsible for returning the trust to their due recipients; and this command applies to both the common people and the ruling men. Misappropriation or breach of trust has been condemned severely. Anas ibn Malik narrates that there was hardly any occasion where Muhammad had delivered a speech but he had not said this "The person who lacks trustworthiness also lacks faith. And the person who does not keep promises has no religion." Muhammad has said,

- "Every one of you is a guardian and everyone will be asked about his subjects. Imam is a guardian. He will be asked about his subjects. A man is the guardian of the persons in his household. He is answerable about them. A woman is the guardian of her husband's house. She will be asked about her responsibility. The servant is the guardian of the articles of his master. He is answerable about this responsibility of his" (Sahih Muslim, 20:4496).

Performing one's duty sincerely and honestly is a trust. It means that a person will have the intention to properly carry out the duties entrusted to him, and will do it in the best possible manner without indulging in corruption. Receiving undue advantages from office is seen as corruption. The rulers of the state or the government officials who do not care for the welfare of their citizens and thus cause sufferings to them are seen as the worst deceiver and have been warned with the direst consequences in afterlife. Adi bin Umaira narrates that he has heard the Prophet as saying:

- "Whomsoever we have given some post and he has concealed a needle or a thing smaller than that, then it will be a misappropriated thing with which he will have to appear on the Day of Judgment" (Sahih Muslim, 20:4514).

Similarly, trust demands that posts be offered to able and deserving persons: persons who will be able to keep the trust of organizations. To deny the public posts to those whose deserve them most, or to make appointments at public posts through nepotism is seen as misappropriation against God, His messenger, and the people. Those who make such unfair appointments have been warned that their prayers would not be accepted, and hell would be their destination. Sahih Bukhari narrates that

- a man asked Muhammad when the Doomsday would occur. Muhammad replied "When deposits in trust would start being lost, then wait for the Doomsday." He was asked again, "What is the meaning of loss of trusts?" He replied: "When responsibilities are entrusted to unfit persons, then wait for the Doomsday" (Sahih al-Bukhari, 8:76:503).

According to Islamic theology, the wealth and abilities given to a man is a trust from God which means that they should be used in ways recommended by God, and these should not be abused for illegal activities.

Protecting the confidential information of the meetings and the secret information of others is also a trust provided that these are not related to illegal activities. Disclosing family secrets, especially that of the wife, is seen as the worst type of misappropriation. It is narrated in Sahih Muslim that

- "On the Day of Judgment before Allah, the greatest act of misappropriation will be that a man may love his wife and the wife may also be inclined towards her husband and then he may disclose his wife's secrets to others."

After Muhammad started his preaching in 610 CE, his relationship with his own tribesmen, the Quraysh people, deteriorated gradually. Despite this, the Quraysh people of Mecca used to deposit their valuable things at Muhammad because of his honesty and trustworthiness. When Muhammad was compelled to leave Mecca because of Quraysh opposition, he directed his cousin Ali to return those deposits at their due recipients after his leave.

==== Sincerity ====
In Islam, sincerity of intention determines the significance of any act, that is to say, the value of any act depends on the motivation behind the act, not on the act itself. Good intention is said to earn reward and God's pleasure while bad intention God's displeasure. In Islamic theology, this applies not only to general act but also to prayers and worshiping. Thus, any act of worshiping which is done to attain worldly fame, or any act of charity which is given to impress people, is considered invalid and is regarded as a sinful act by Islamic jurisprudence. Only those acts of prayer or charity which are done to seek God's pleasure or to benefit people are granted by God. In Islam, sincerity of intention has some other significances:

a) if a person sincerely intends to do any good deed and then becomes unable to materialize it into action due to any reason, he is still said to get reward for it;
b) an act of worshiping done to gain worldly fame and not to seek God's pleasure is regarded as lesser shirk;
c) the reward for a righteous act increases from ten to thousand times depending on the sincerity of the doer's intention.

== Controversial and contemporary moral issues ==
In addition to virtues praised and encouraged by Quran and hadith, there are positions on controversial, contemporary, practical "moral issues" subscribe to by "Islamic ethicists" (with the caveat that not all Muslims will agree) involving sex, marriage, and family.

=== Sex ===
Sexual intercourse—and not celibacy—is celebrated, but within limits. It must be between a married couple, and must not include: anal sex or during menstruation, sex between men, or between women. Although in Shia Islam, some tolerance is shown towards men who have premarital sex, as temporary marriage, Nikah mut'ah (which may last only a few hours). However, this practice is not recognized and is strictly prohibited in Sunni Islam (roughly 90% of the Muslim population). Sexual relations cause ritual impurity, and require major ritual purification (Ghusl) before prayer (salah). Modern birth control is "generally accepted"; while pornography, using sex in advertising, and crossdressing are all considered wrong.

=== Family and marriage ===
Islamic law "prescribes marriage", and for the married to have children. Malcolm Clark writes that "the patriarchal family is considered "the divine norm;" but "mutuality is encouraged" between the spouses. A "crucial religious requirement" of marriage is a "contract negotiated by the man and the male representative of the woman and signed in the presence of two". Also recommended is marriage at an early age (though less feasible in the modern age) with a public celebratory feast. A husband may have up to four wives (where laws permit) but must "treat them equally".

If a man or woman has been wet nursed as a child, there are restrictions on whom they can marry. The Quran prohibits Muslims from marrying their wet nurse (in the case of men) or their wet nurse's husband (in the case of women), or any other children the women has breastfed. One hadith prohibited a woman from marrying her wet-nurse's husband. This is because Quran 4:23 (and hadith) regard ties due to milk kinship similar to ties due to blood kinship, known as mahrams in Islam.

Clark also writes that the husband is responsible for the support of the wife (Q 4:34), and the wife "responsible for the care of the children and the management of the home". Work outside the home by wives is allowed if her duties of childrearing and household management are fulfilled. Divorce was traditionally allowed by "triple talaq" (telling the wife "I divorce thee" three times) by the husband (although originally the talaqs were to be spread over three months). Wives can divorce husbands but it is more difficult than a triple talaq. "Children are a pain", and should be "treated with equal justice", and shown love and affection by their father. Legal adoption of children, and insemination by a donor male are forbidden. Grown children should show parents respect and care for them when they are elderly.

=== Women ===
Despite the perception that women have a "second-class" status in Islam, women have "the same religious rights and duties as men", although their position is "separate but equal". In the public sphere "men take the leadership role", and in the home and domestic sphere women take the lead. This physical separation and separation in areas of leadership applies to the mosque, where women are required to be in a separate part of the mosque from men. A daughter gets only one-half of the inheritance of a son. (This is because the son is ordered to use the money for himself and his family, while the daughter's money is used solely for herself) Women are explicitly forbidden from marrying a non-Muslim man (Q.2:221; 60:10); Muslim men are forbidden from marrying outside the faith, except to "People of the Book" (Christians and Jews), and only under certain circumstances. This is to prevent a Muslim from leaving Islam, the idea being a woman is more likely to adopt the religion of her husband than vice versa. Women should be veiled. Opinions differ as to whether this means only dressing modestly or, on the other end of the spectrum, covering the entire body from head to toe, such as hijab and niqab.

=== Medicine ===
As with many religions, Islam holds that "medicine should promote life" and should not do anything to take it away. Abortion is forbidden(unless it's before 4th month of pregnancy according to majority), or to protect the life of the mother, and sometimes in cases of rape. Suicide and euhanasia are forbidden.

=== Alcohol, drugs, gambling ===
Alcohol, drugs, and gambling are all prohibited in Islam. They "cater to the vices of greed and cloud the mental faculties".

== Moral beliefs among contemporary Muslims ==
Public opinion surveys conducted by the Pew Research Center between 2008 and 2012 in 39 countries and territories in Africa, Asia and Europe found "most Muslims agree on certain moral principles."

- On the subject of whether it "is necessary to believe in God to be a moral person",
  - nine out of ten Muslims answered yes in Southeast Asia.
  - in South Asia and the Middle East/North Africa region, at least eight-in-ten said yes in all but one country surveyed, the exception being Lebanon where 64% agreed with the statement.
- "There also is widespread agreement that some behaviors – including drinking alcohol, sex outside marriage, homosexuality and committing suicide – are immoral."

== See also ==
- Islamic ethics
- Islamic etiquette
- Islam and humanity
- Justice in the Quran
- Morality and religion
- Glossary of Islam
- Outline of Islam
- Index of Islam-related articles

== Bibliography ==
- Al-Ghazali, Muhammad (2004). Muslim's Character. English translation by Mufti A. H. Usmani. ISBN 978-1567447262
- Ali, Abbas J. (2015). Handbook of Research on Islamic Business Ethics. Edward Elgar Publishing. ISBN 9781781009451.
- Alkhuli, Muhammad Ali (2006). The Need For Islam. Al Manhal. ISBN 9789957401627.
- Birgivi, Imam. The Path of Muhammad: A Book on Islamic Morals and Ethics. Translated by Shaykh Tosun Bayak al-Jerrahi al-Halveti (2005). Canada: World Wisdom, Inc. ISBN 0-941532-68-2
- Buhl, F.; Welch, A. T. (1993). "Muḥammad". Encyclopaedia of Islam. Vol. 7 (2nd ed.). Edited by C. E. Bosworth, E. van Donzel, and Wolfhart Heinrichs. Brill Academic Publishers. ISBN 90-04-09419-9.
- Campo, Juan E. (2009). "Ethics and morality". Encyclopedia of Islam. Infobase. pp. 214–216. ISBN 9781438126968.
- Clark, Malcolm (2011). Islam For Dummies. John Wiley & Sons. ISBN 978-1-118-05396-6.
- Clark, Malcolm (2019). Islam For Dummies (ebook ed.). John Wiley & Sons. ISBN 9781119643043.
- Hashmi, Sohail H., ed. (2009). Islamic Political Ethics: Civil Society, Pluralism, and Conflict. Princeton University Press. ISBN 9781400825370.
- D'Silva, Joyce; Jacky Turner, ed. (2012). Animals, Ethics and Trade: The Challenge of Animal Sentience. Routledge. ISBN 9781136571695.
- Khadduri, Majid (1984). The Islamic Conception of Justice. The Johns Hopkins University Press. ISBN 9780801869747
- Khan, Muhammad Zafrullah (1980). Muhammad: Seal of the Prophets. Routledge & Kegan Paul. ISBN 0-7100-0610-1.
- Leaman, Oliver (2006). The Qur'an: An Encyclopedia. Taylor & Francis. ISBN 9780415326391.
- Long, Matthew (2011). Islamic Beliefs, Practices, and Cultures. Marshall Cavendish Corporation. ISBN 978-0-7614-7926-0. Retrieved 2 September 2014.
- Maariful Quran (exegesis of the Quran) by Muhammad Shafi. Karachi.
- Nigosian, S. A. (2004). Islam: Its History, Teaching, and Practices. Indiana University Press. ISBN 0-253-21627-3.
- Rassool, G.Hussein, ed. (2014). Cultural Competence in Caring for Muslim Patients. Palgrave Macmillan. ISBN 9781137358417
- Shibli Nomani. Sirat-un-Nabi. Lahore.
- Stefon, Matt, ed. (2010). Islamic Beliefs and Practices. New York: Britannica Educational Publishing. ISBN 978-1-61530-060-0.
