= Islamic ethics =

Ethics, virtue, and character in Islam

Islamic ethics (Arabic: أخلاق إسلامية) is the "philosophical reflection upon moral conduct" with a view to defining "good character" and attaining the "pleasure of God" (raza-e Ilahi). It is distinguished from "Islamic morality", which pertains to "specific norms or codes of behavior".

It took shape as a field of study or an "Islamic science" (ʿIlm al-Akhlaq), gradually from the 7th century and was finally established by the 11th century. Although it was considered less important than sharia and fiqh "in the eyes of the ulama" (Islamic scholars) "moral philosophy" was an important subject for Muslim intellectuals. Many scholars consider it shaped as a successful amalgamation of the Quranic teachings, the teachings of Muhammad, the precedents of Islamic jurists (see sharia and fiqh), the pre-Islamic Arabian tradition, and non-Arabic elements—including Persian and Greek ideas—embedded in or integrated with a generally Islamic structure. Although Muhammad's preaching produced a: "radical change in moral values based on the sanctions of the new religion [...] and fear of God and of the Last Judgment"; the tribal practice of Arabs did not completely die out. Later Muslim scholars expanded the religious ethic of the Quran and Hadith in immense detail.

== Terminology ==
A number of related terms refer to the right way to behave in Islam: Akhlaq, Adab, Ihsan.

=== Akhlaq ===
Akhlaq (Arabic: أخلاق, /æxˈlɑːk/, plural of (Arabic: خلق khulq which means disposition), is the practice of virtue, morality, and manners in Islamic theology and falsafah (philosophy). Akhlaq is the most commonly used Islamic term for morality.

The science of ethics (`Ilm al-Akhlaq) teaches that through practice and conscious effort man can surpass their natural dispositions and natural uncorrupted state (Fitrah) to become more ethical and well mannered. Akhlaq is a kind of normative ethical system known as "virtue ethics", which is based on "virtues, or moral character", rather than: "conceptions of the right (as in Kantian ethics) or the good (as in utilitarianism)".

Akhlaq is not found in the Quran, but its root – kh-l-q – is shared by khaliq (Creator) and makhluq (creature), which are found throughout the Quran. It is most commonly translated in English-Arabic dictionaries as: disposition, nature, temper, ethics, morals or manners or in general a person who has good manners, and behaves well.

=== Adab ===
Adab (Arabic: أدب) in the context of behavior, refers to prescribed Islamic etiquette: "refinement, good manners, morals, decorum, decency, humaneness" (according to the book Religion and Law). While interpretation of the scope and particulars of Adab may vary among different cultures, common among these interpretations is regard for personal standing through the observation of certain codes of behavior. To exhibit Adab would be to show "proper discrimination of correct order, behavior, and taste."

A description of the difference between Akhlaq and Adab is:

- Aklaq is ethics, the "moral philosophy"; Ethics/morality. Islamic behaviour, disposition, good conduct, nature, temper, ethics, morals or character of a person.
- Adab is "the actual practices of moral philosophy"; Manner, attitude, behaviour and the etiquette of putting things in their proper place "a culture of refined behavior [that] shaped the ethical outlook of urban Muslims" There were writings setting forth "the virtues for different classes and groups to honor, including the ulama, rulers, bureaucrats, merchants and craftsmen".

Furthermore, according to one source (Abdulmajeed Hassan Bello), sharia is not just concerned with concerned:

" [...] with legal rules and regulations indicating what man is entitled or bound to do, [...] but also what he ought, in conscience, to do or refrain from doing. Thus, shari'ah [...] embraces both private and public activities."

=== Ihsān ===
Iḥsān (also Ihsaan, Arabic: إحسان), is an Arabic term meaning "beautification", "perfection" or "excellence", but is also defined in Islam (by Malcolm Clark) as ethics/morality "literally virtue, including right living", and (according to Ruqaiyyah Waris Maqsood) is a matter of taking one's inner faith and showing it in both deed and action.

=== Other terms ===
Other terms found in the Quran that "denote the concept of moral or religious goodness" are:

- al-khayr ("goodness"),
- al-birr ("righteousness"),
- al-qisr,
- al-iqsat ("equity"),
- al-adl ("justice"),
- al-haqq ("truth and right"),
- al-ma'ruf ("known and approved"), and
- al-taqwa ("piety").
- "Pious actions" are "normally referred to" as salihat; "impious or sinful actions" as sayyi'at.

=== Ethics v. morality ===
Juan E. Campo describes the difference between Akhlaq/ethics and morality in Islam as :

"Ethics means philosophical reflection upon moral conduct, while morality pertains to specific norms or codes of behavior. Questions of ethics, therefore, involve such subjects as human nature and the capacity to do good, the nature of good and evil, motivations for moral action, the underlying principles governing moral and immoral acts, deciding who is obliged to adhere to the moral code and who is exempted from it, and the implications of either adhering to the moral code or violating it. Morality encompasses the values and rules that govern human conduct [...] "

== Scriptural sources ==
=== Quran ===
The Quran—which Muslims believe to be the verbatim word of God—serves as the primary source of moral teachings in Islam. Verse 2:177 declares:

"Righteousness is not in turning your faces towards the east or the west. Rather, the righteous are those who believe in Allah, the Last Day, the angels, the Books, and the prophets; who give charity out of their cherished wealth to relatives, orphans, the poor, ˹needy˺ travellers, beggars, and for freeing captives; who establish prayer, pay alms-tax, and keep the pledges they make; and who are patient in times of suffering, adversity, and in ˹the heat of˺ battle. It is they who are true ˹in faith˺, and it is they who are mindful ˹of Allah˺."

Another verse states:

"Believers are those […] who avoid vain talk; who are active in deeds of charity; who abstain from sex except with their wives, or whom their right hands possess. Thus they're free from blame, but those whose desires exceed those limits are transgressors. Believers faithfully observe their trusts and covenants and keep their prayers. They will be the heirs, who will inherit Paradise, where they will dwell." —(Q.23:3–11)

However, the Quran offers "more in the way of general principles"—justice, goodness, kindness, forgiveness, honesty, and piety – "than specific rules".

The Quran presents justice, good conduct and generosity toward others as ethical obligations. Quran 16:90 commands justice, good conduct, and giving to relatives, while prohibiting immorality, wrongdoing and oppression.

==== The Ten Commandments In Quran ====
The Quran provides the Ten Commandments which is believed to be as originally revealed to Moses:

151. Say, "Come, I will recite what your Lord has prohibited to you. [He commands] that you not associate anything with Him, and to parents, good treatment, and do not kill your children out of poverty; We will provide for you and them. And do not approach immoralities - what is apparent of them and what is concealed. And do not kill the soul which Allāh has forbidden [to be killed] except by [legal] right. This has He instructed you that you may use reason."

152. And do not approach the orphan's property except in a way that is best [i.e., intending improvement] until he reaches maturity. And give full measure and weight in justice. We do not charge any soul except [with that within] its capacity. And when you speak [i.e., testify], be just, even if [it concerns] a near relative. And the covenant of Allāh fulfill. This has He instructed you that you may remember.

153. And, [moreover], this is My path, which is straight, so follow it; and do not follow [other] ways, for you will be separated from His way. This has He instructed you that you may become righteous.

Evidence for these verses having some relation to Moses and the Ten Commandments is from the verse which immediately follows them:

Then, We gave Musa (Moses) the Book, to complete (Our Favour) upon those who would do right, and explaining all things in detail and a guidance and a mercy that they might believe in the meeting with their Lord.

According to a narration in al-Mustadrak 'ala al-Sahihayn, Ibn Abbas, a prominent narrator of Isra'iliyyat traditions said: "In Surah Al-An'am, there are clear Ayat, and they are the Mother of the Book (the Quran)." He then recited the above verses.

Also in al-Mustadrak 'ala al-Sahihayn is the narration of Ubada ibn as-Samit:

The Messenger of Allah said, "Who among you will give me his pledge to do three things?"

He then recited the (above) Ayah (6:151–153).

He then said, "Whoever fulfills (this pledge), then his reward will be with Allah, but whoever fell into shortcomings and Allah punishes him for it in this life, then that will be his recompense. Whoever Allah delays (his reckoning) until the Hereafter, then his matter is with Allah. If He wills, He will punish him, and if He wills, He will forgive him."

Ibn Kathir mentions a narration of Abd Abdullah ibn Mas'ud in his Tafsir:

"Whoever wishes to read the will and testament of the Messenger of Allah on which he placed his seal, let him read these Ayat (6:151–53)."

Order	Commandment in the Quran	Surat Al-An'am	Surat Al-Isra	Corresponding in the Bible
First Commandment	Do not associate others with God	(151)	(22)	Do not put other gods before me
Second Commandment	Honour your parents	(151)	(23–24)	Honour thy father and thy mother
Third Commandment	Do not kill your children for fear of poverty	(151)	(26–31)	Do not murder
Fourth Commandment	Do not come near indecencies, openly or secretly.	(151)	(32)	Do not covet thy neighbour's wife, Do not commit adultery
Fifth Commandment	Do not take a life except justly	(151)	(33)	Do not murder
Sixth Commandment	Do not come near the property of the orphan except to enhance it	(152)	(34)	Do not covet his slaves, or his animals, or anything of thy neighbour
Seventh Commandment	Give full measure and weigh with justice	(152)	(35)	Does not exist, instead there is Remember the sabbath day
Eighth Commandment	Whenever you testify, maintain justice even regarding a close relative	(152)	(36)	Do not bear false witness against thy neighbour
Ninth Commandment	Fulfil your covenant with God	(152)	(34)	Do not take the name of the Lord thy God in vain
Tenth Commandment	Follow God's path and not any other	(153)	(37–39)	Do not make unto thee any graven image or idols neither kneel before them nor worship them

=== Hadith ===
Hadith, which are based on reports of the teachings, deeds and sayings, silent permissions (or disapprovals) of the Islamic prophet Muhammad, as well as various reports about Muhammad's companions, also serves as an important source for Islamic moral teachings. Some hadith cited expressing good conduct, deeds, morals in Islam, and the importance of these include:

- In a narration by Aisha, the Messenger of Allah said: "Indeed among the believers with the most complete faith is the one who is the best in conduct, and the most kind to his family." (Jamiʽ al-Tirmidhi 2612)
- In a naration in al-Muwatta, "Yahya related to me from Malik that he had heard that the Messenger of Allah: " [...] I was sent to perfect the ethical conduct."

The Hadith of Gabriel describes the angel Jibril (Gabriel) questioning Muhammad about: "what is faith?" "what is Islam?" and "What is Ihsan (perfection or virtue)?", where in reply Muhammad lists the "Five Pillars of Islam", the "Six Articles of Faith", and describes Ihsan (which Clark defines as ethics, or "virtue and including right living") thusly:

- "To worship Allah as if you see Him, and if you cannot achieve this state of devotion then you must consider that He is looking at you."

=== Other sources ===
Besides the Quran and Hadith, there are a number of other sources, (not all universally followed in Islam):

- the works of Islamic scholars and philosophers;
- Arabic virtues that predate Islam, (such as "honor, courage, loyalty, hospitality, self-control", etc.;
- the moral examples set by important Islamic personalities (such as the four rightly guided caliphs for Sunni Muslims);
- works on Adab (i.e. etiquette, manners);
- "philosophical reflection" by the school of Islam known as the Mu'tazilites and others;
- "works of Greek ethicists", (which were translated into Arabic);
- the 99 names of God, which among other qualities/attributes include names based on virtues—"the gentle, the grateful, the just, the giver, the equitable, the loving", etc.;
- Ethical values from Sufism "including humility and poverty".

=== Contrast with other faith-based systems ===
One perspective holds that Islamic ethics place less emphasis on original sin and asceticism than Christian ethics, and to a lesser extent, Jewish ethics. Unlike the doctrine of inherent sinfulness found in some Christian traditions, Islam is said to view human beings as born in a state of natural purity, capable of moral choice. Although the Qur'an contains over a hundred references to hell and judgment, it also emphasizes trust in God, gratitude, and life-affirming values such as generosity and moral stamina. Islamic ethical teachings, including the concept of vicegerency (khalifah) and obligatory acts like zakat, are often framed in terms of social responsibility and active moral conduct. This view contrasts with what has been described as the more ascetic or sin-focused tendencies in other Abrahamic traditions.

== History ==
Some of the most important scholars who contributed to the area of moral philosophy during the Middle Ages were:

- Miskawayh (932–1030), the Persian author of Refinement of Character,
- Abu Hamid al-Ghazali (c. 1058–1111), author of Revival of the Religious Sciences,
- Ali ibn Hazm (994–1064) "the Andalusian man of letters".

Also influential were

- Abu Yusuf Yaacub al-Kindi (c. 801–873),
- Abu Bakr Muhammad al-Razi (d. ca 925),
- Abu Nasr al-Farabi (d. 950),
- Abu 'Ali al-Husayn Ibn Sina (aka Avicenna, d. 1037),
- Muhammad ibn Rushd (aka Averroes, d. 1198),
- Nasir al-Din al-Tusi (1201–1274).

Moral philosophy as a topic of Muslim scholarly discussion "declined after the 12th century", but underwent a revival in the 19th and 20th centuries.

=== Codification of Islamic ethics ===
Islamic ethics was codified, based on the Quran and practices of Muhammad, over a period of time and in context of the practices of the Muslim community (ummah). The Quran commands every human being—in all spheres of life—to "command the good and forbid evil", as spelled out by Muhammad. Another key factor in the field of Islamic ethics is the belief (as described in the Qur'an) that all mankind has been granted the faculty to discern God's will (fitrah), and thus the moral responsibility to submit to His will by following Islam, regardless of their environment.

This natural inclination to obey God, is—according to the Quran—in conflict with another human inclination, the desire for material possessions and comforts; first for basic survival or security, then for status in society. Ultimately, this desire results in a state of jahiliyya, "heedlessness", or ignorance of mankind's responsibility to obey God.

The establishment of Islam brought a great transformation in the society, moral order of life, world view, and the hierarchy of values in the Arabian Peninsula.

1. The division of Arabs into varying tribes (based upon blood and kinship), was confronted by the ideal of a unified community, a Muslim community (ummah), based upon Islamic piety.
2. The acceptance of the worship of a multitude of deities besides Allah, a view challenged by strict Islamic monotheism, which dictates that Allah has no partner in worship nor any equal;
3. The trait of "manliness" (muruwwa), which Islam discouraged, instead emphasizing on the traits of humility and piety;
4. The focus on achieving fame or establishing a legacy, which was replaced by the concept that mankind would be called to account before God on the day of resurrection;
5. The reverence of and compliance with ancestral traditions, was challenged by Islam's assignment of primacy to submitting to God and following revelation.

But although pre-Islamic Arabia exemplified "heedlessness", it was not entirely without merit, and certain aspects—such as the care for one's near kin, for widows, orphans, and others in need and for the establishment of justice—would be retained in Islam, re-ordered in importance and placed in the context of strict monotheism.

=== Politics and public policy ===
According to Lenn Goodman, many medieval Muslim thinkers pursued humanistic and rational approaches in discourses regarding values. On the other hand, Roderick Hindery finds it difficult to find "humanistic values that have not been later affirmed" by Muslim (and Christian) "theologians and religious ethicians", as they "reexamine and rewrite" their religion's "history to make it coincide with a humanistic history".

==== Human rights ====
Some scholars and activists have esteemed "the Islamic tradition as the highest manifestation of human right", while others have criticized the concept of "human rights" as a "western colonial invention used to oppress Muslims by making them conform to certain western norms". In 1990, the Organisation of Islamic Cooperation (OIC) issued the Cairo Declaration of Human Rights (CDHR), in reply to the 1948 Universal Declaration of Human Rights (UDHR). The CDHR is based on traditional sharia (sharia is mentioned throughout the entire document as the most authoritative source of law), and guarantees some human rights, while denying some articles from the UDHR "dealing with gender, the family, religious freedom, and importantly, self-determination".

Ash'arism, one of three orthodox theological schools of Sunni Islam generally denies that there are universal moral truths. Ethics are based solely on God's command, which might align with human rights by coincidence, but this is not necessary. Therefore, many conservative Muslims doubt that human rights are beyond cultural ties or universal.

Maturidism, another orthodox theological school of Sunni Islam, however, overshadowed by Ash'arism in the last centuries, yet still prominent in Central Asia, adheres to the belief of objective morality, which can be deducted through reason. Thus, Muslims adhering to Maturidi theology, might possibly agree on human rights.

==== Religious pluralism ====
While religious minorities were not granted equality with Islam, classical Sharia, allowed the functioning of the religious laws and courts of Christians, Jews, and Hindus in lands ruled by Islam. These were usually accommodated within the Islamic legal framework, as seen in the early Caliphate, al-Andalus, the Indian subcontinent, and the Ottoman Millet system. Non-Muslims were allowed to engage in religious practices that were forbidden to Muslims by Islamic law. In a notable example, Zoroastrian practice of incestuous "self-marriage" (Xwedodah) where a man could marry his mother, sister, or daughter, was to be tolerated according to Ibn Qayyim (1292–1350). He based his opinion on the precedent that Muhammad had knowledge of their practices, coming in contact with them, but did not forbid such self-marriages. Religious minorities were also free to do whatever they wished in their own homes, provided they did not publicly engage in illicit sexual activity in ways that could threaten public morals.

==== Freedom of expression ====
In classical Islamic law, public expression was subject to legal and ethical limits shaped by principles of justice (adl), public interest (maslaḥa), and the prevention of harm (darʾ al-mafāsid). Among the most serious offenses that could involve public expression were blasphemy (insulting Islam or its sacred symbols) and apostasy (renouncing the religion after professing it), though jurists differed on definitions and legal procedures. In some historical periods, apostasy laws were applied in ways that did not fully follow the procedures outlined in classical Islamic legal texts. While enforcing religious orthodoxy and protecting public order were recognized roles of Islamic authorities, some applications of these laws were influenced by political motives or lacked proper legal process. This pattern was not unique to Islam and can be found in other major religious traditions as well.

In the medieval Arab Muslim world, literary expression was shaped by a range of informal controls. Zoltan Szombathy notes that there was no formal censorship system in the pre-modern Islamic world like those found in modern states. Instead, expression was shaped by social expectations, courtly manners, and personal discretion. Offensive speech could prompt responses ranging from social disapproval to imprisonment or, in rare cases, execution. These responses were driven more by political and social circumstances than by consistent legal rules. Controversial or irreverent poetry often circulated widely, with authors relying on rhetorical skill and indirect language to avoid backlash. The boundaries of acceptable speech were not fixed, but shaped by the ethical values and power dynamics of the time.

During the Abbasid period, Caliph al-Mahdi (r. 775–785 CE) led a campaign against individuals labeled as Zindiqs—a term applied to Manicheans, dualists, and some freethinkers—which involved arrests, executions, and the commissioning of refutations. such campaigns were more common in the early period of Islamic history, whereas later practice generally tolerated heterodox beliefs so long as they remained private.

On the other hand, Amira Nowaira writes that:

"Islamic thinkers of the early medieval period expressed ideas and engaged in debates that would appear strangely enlightened in comparison with the attitudes and views adopted by modern Islamic scholarship."

An example being the toleration of medieval physician, philosopher, and alchemist Abu Bakr al-Razi (865–925 CE), who argued that the Quran was "illogical and self-contradictory".

Islamic literature also includes charming anecdotes of tolerance towards non-Muslims and others lacking in power. Imad-ad-Dean Ahmad quotes a letter by a cousin of Caliph al-Ma'mun, in which he gives permission to a Christian he was attempting to convert to speak his mind freely, as evidence that in Islam even religious controversies were not exempt from open discussion. In a letter written by the fourth Rashidun Caliph and first cousin of Muhammad, Ali ibn Abi Talib to his governor of Egypt, Malik al-Ashtar. The Caliph advises his governor on dealings with the poor masses thusly:

"Out of your hours of work, fix a time for the complainants and for those who want to approach you with their grievances. During this time you should do no other work but hear them and pay attention to their complaints and grievances. For this purpose you must arrange public audience for them during this audience, for the sake of Allah, treat them with kindness, courtesy and respect. Do not let your army and police be in the audience hall at such times so that those who have grievances against your regime may speak to you freely, unreservedly and without fear."

— Nahjul Balaagha letter 53

==== Health and medical peer review ====
Because Islam views itself as a total system governing all areas, Islamic medical ethics view the patient as a whole. Classical texts speak more about "health", than "illness", showing an emphasis on prevention rather than cure.

The first documented description of a peer review process is found in the Ethics of the Physician by Ishāq bin Ali al-Rohawi (854–931) of al-Raha, Syria, where the notes of a practicing Islamic physician were reviewed by peers and the physician could face a lawsuit from a maltreated patient if the reviews were negative.

==== Animal welfare ====
Concern for the treatment of animals can be found in the Qur'an and in the teachings of the Islamic Prophet Muhammad, which inspired debates over animal rights by later medieval Muslim scholars. The 10th-century work, "Disputes Between Animals and Man", part of the Encyclopedia of the Brethren of Purity, has been considered a classic in this regard. Inspired by the Quranic verse: "All living beings roaming the earth and winged birds soaring in the sky are communities like yourselves." (6:38), the Shafi'i jurist 'Izz al-Din Ibn 'Abd al-Salam al-Sulami (d. 1262) formulated the first full-fledged charter of the rights of livestock and animals in his legal treatise Rules for Judgement in the Cases of Living Beings (Qawa'id al-ahkam fi masalih al-anam) which was based on the stories and sayings of Muhammad.

==== Environmentalism ====
A number of sources assert the benevolent attitude of Muhammad and Islam towards natural resources, conservation and wildlife. Tom Verde writes in Aramco World that in early Islam, after Muslims established themselves in Medina, Muhammad surveyed the natural resources in the region—the wadis (riverbeds); the rich, black volcanic soil; the high rangelands—and decreed that they be preserved and set aside as a hima ("protected place"). İbrahim Özdemir writes that (Note: "of 'Islamic environmentalism' based on Islamic tradition – rather than imported 'white saviour' environmentalism",) "approximately 200 verses" in the Quran are concerned with the environment—such as one stating "greater indeed than the creation of man is the creation of the heavens and the earth". (Note: Among the 28 hadiths on agriculture compiled in the "Book of Agriculture" of the Sahih Bukhari on the proper way to determine ownership, rents, cultivation of crops and sharing of harvest, are hadith on sowing seeds and planting trees.)

== Traditional Akhlaq ethical system ==
Akhlaq is described as a system of "virtue ethics" that emphasize the virtues, or moral character of the human actor involved. Virtue ethics are one of "three major approaches in normative ethics" in human societies—the other two being "deontology", which emphasizes duties or rules, and "consequentialism", which emphasizes the consequences of actions of the human actor. Another source, (Technische Universität Darmstadt), describes "virtue theory" ethics as emphasizing moral education to "develop good habits of character based" on "rules like 'do not steal'," etc.

=== Virtue and good character ===
Moral Character primarily refers to the assemblage of moral qualities (virtues and vices) in an individual. Promotion of good/virtuous character is found in the canonical texts of Islam. The Quran describes Muhammad as being 'on exalted quality of character' (Q 68:4), and refers to him as 'an excellent example' (Q33:21) which ultimately means that the religious and moral examples, set by Muhammad, are to be followed and cultivated by the Muslims in order to construct a morally good character. In addition, numerous sayings of Muhammad highlighted the importance of good character:

- Anas ibn Malik reported that the Prophet said: "The one with good morals and character already owns the best of this world and the Hereafter." (Tabarani and Abu Dawud).
- Abu Hurayrah reported that the Prophet said: "I have been sent for the perfection of character." (Imam Ahmad and Bayhaqi).
- Anas ibn Malik reported that the Messenger of Allah said: "A person reaches the best and most honored levels in the Hereafter as a result of good character [...] And bad character condemns a person to the lowest depths of Hell." (Tabarani).
- "One can repent for any sin but bad character—because with bad character, before a person can attempt to ask forgiveness for one sin, he commits a worse." (Tabarani, Isfahani).

There was a debate among the early Islamic moralists as to whether character could be changed to promote virtue and diminish vices. They recognized the dual aspect of character—innate and acquired—and thus noted that with conscious practice it could be changed to a certain degree. "Just as a muscle grows stronger with exercise, character grows strong with practice [...] the good act becomes easier to us each time we do it."

Muslim moralists have discussed the importance of having a good character as well as the ways of acquiring it. Imam Birgivi, a 16th-century Muslim scholar and moralist, says that: "To cure yourself of a bad feature of character is an obligation". Continuous practice of moral virtues and a conscious effort to internalize those qualities can lead to the formation of a morally good character. Al-Isfahani says that purification of soul means the control, not the elimination, of desires. He taught that character meant not only obeying the laws of Islam but internalizing them in your soul. According to Birgivi, changing of character depends on such things as: "a person's wish and the strength of one's understanding", and the preservation of a good character requires the avoidance of the company of evil-charactered people who indulge into indecent activities, drunkenness, and meaningless gossip.

=== Theory ===
Ethics or "Disposition" is a "faculty" (malakah), "a property of the soul" (nafs), "which comes into existence through exercise and repetitive practice" is not easily destroyed. A particular malakah may appear because of one of the following reasons:

1. Fitrah (natural state): The original state in which humans are created by Allah. Muslims believe Allah determined certain aspects of their lives for which they are not accountable (e.g., their place of birth and physical appearance)
2. 'Āda (habit): Formed by continual repetition of certain acts and creates a certain disposition.
3. Practice and conscious effort: Which if persistent will eventually produce a disposition.

Although fitra produces certain dispositions, (it is thought) man can surpass nature through free will and effort. While dispositions caused by mental faculties (i.e., intelligence, memory, mental agility etc.) are not alterable, others dispositions can change. Man's capacity to change his dispositions need not mean destroying instincts of reproduction or self-preservation, but avoiding extremes so they (the dispositions) perform their functions properly.

- "Indeed I have been sent to complete the best of character (akhlaq)." (Hadith of Muhammad narrated by Abu Hurayrah)
- "The most complete of believers in iman (faith) are those who are best in character." (Anas, the brother of Abu Dharr al-Ghifari).

=== 'Ilm al-Akhlaq ===
ʿIlm al-Akhlaq is translated in English as "ethics, moral science, morals" (ʿIlm being science or study). Al-Ghazali defined Ilm al-Akhlaq as "the way to acquire the well being of the soul and to guard it against the vices".

The science also dwells on how the level of human virtue is determined by discipline and effort; the movement between the extremes of human behavior, "the lowest is below beasts and the highest surpasses even the angels;" how 'knowledge is the thickest of veils', preventing man from seeing reality (haqiqah when ethics and purification (tazkiyah) have not been mastered; and how by improving their akhlaq, the Muslims improve their Ibadah (worship).

=== Tazkiyah al-Nafs ===
Tazkiyah al-nafs: "is the purification of the soul from inclination towards evils and sins, and the development of its fitrah (natural unsocialized state) towards goodness, which leads to its uprightness and its reaching ihsan [perfection or at least excellence]", according to Anas Karzoon. Scholars—such as Mulla Muhammad Mahdi Naraqi—teach that "moral virtues bring eternal happiness, while moral corruption leads to everlasting wretchedness", so that blameworthy traits (akhlāq madhmūma) must be purged. God will help those seeking purification: "And those who strive for Us—We will surely guide them to Our ways. And indeed, Allah is with the doers of good." (Q.29:69)

=== Malakah of the Soul: effects & characteristics ===
The soul is created devoid of traits. As one progresses through life, he develops malakat related to his lifestyle. The soul becomes accustomed to repeated behavior, which then determines actions. Noble faculties manifest moral and wise behaviour, while evil faculties manifest immorality. These faculties determine the fate in the Akhirah.

The Quran says:

"We have bound every human's destiny to their neck. And on the Day of Judgment We will bring forth to each ˹person˺ a record which they will find laid open. ˹And it will be said,˺ "Read your record. You ˹alone˺ are sufficient this Day to take account of yourself."

"And the record ˹of deeds˺ will be laid ˹open˺, and you will see the wicked in fear of what is ˹written˺ in it. They will cry, "Woe to us! What kind of record is this that does not leave any sin, small or large, unlisted?" They will find whatever they did present ˹before them˺. And your Lord will never wrong anyone."

"˹Watch for˺ the Day when every soul will be presented with whatever good it has done. And it will wish that its misdeeds were far off. And Allah warns you about Himself. And Allah is Ever Gracious to ˹His˺ servants."

=== Goodness and happiness ===
The aim of tazkiyah and moral development is to attain felicity and happiness. Tazkiyah causes self-knowledge and knowledge of God. Man's most consummate felicity is reflecting divine attributes. According to Qatada ibn al-Nu'man, the content soul (an-nafs al-mutma'inna) is: "the soul of the believer, made calm by what Allah has promised. Its owner is at complete rest and content with his knowledge of Allah's names and attributes..."

== Norms/codes ==
"Practical guidelines" or "specific norms or codes of behavior" for good doing based primarily on the Quran and the Hadith are primarily "commonly known moral virtues" whose major points "most religions largely agree on". They include kindness (to people and animals), charity, forgiveness, honesty, patience, justice, respecting parents and elders, keeping promises, and controlling one's anger.

== Ethical education and behavior ==
Drawing on a cross-sectional study of Muslim youths in southern Thailand and other sources, academic Kasetchai Laeheem found that the "common behavioral problem" of a lack of Islamic ethics within Muslim societies, often leads to Muslim youths committing "sin openly" and "as a habit without shame". However, high levels of Islamic ethical behavior among Muslim youth, are often correlated with: "the Islamic way of upbringing, knowledge of the religion, participation in Islamic activities, and practicing Islamic principles".

== See also ==
=== Terms ===
- Akhlaq
- Halal
- Haram
- Sharia

=== General links ===
- Early Islamic philosophy
- Ethics in religion
  - Christian ethics
  - Jewish ethics
- Islam and humanity
- Islam and domestic violence
- Islamic bioethics
- Islamic democracy
- Islamic Golden Age
- Islamic sexual jurisprudence
- Islamic views on slavery
- Morality
- Peace in Islamic philosophy
- Women in Islam
- Glossary of Islam
- Outline of Islam
- Index of Islam-related articles
