= Islam and humanity =

Islamic teachings on humanity and human welfare

Islamic teachings on humanity and human welfare have been codified in its central religious book known as the Quran, which the Muslims believe was revealed by God for the humankind. These teachings have often been exemplified by Islamic prophet Muhammad as displayed in his sayings and practices. To the Muslims, Islam is what the Quran has instructed to do and how Muhammad has put them into practice. Thus, the understanding of any Islamic topic generally rely on these two.

== Social welfare in Islam ==
In Islamic tradition, the idea of social welfare has been presented as one of its principal values, and the practice of social service at its various forms has been instructed and encouraged. A Muslim's religious life remains incomplete if not attended by service to humanity. The following verse of the Quran is often cited to encapsulate the Islamic idea of social welfare:

"It is not righteousness that ye turn your faces towards East or West; but it is righteousness to believe in Allah and the Last Day, and the Angels, and the Book and the Messengers; to spend of your substance, out of love for Him, for your kin, for orphans, for the needy, for the wayfarer, for those who ask, and for the ransom of slaves; to be steadfast in prayer, and practice regular charity, to fulfill the contracts which we have made; and to be firm and patient, in pain (or suffering) and adversity, and throughout all periods of panic. Such are the people of truth, the God fearing."

— Quran 2:177

Similarly, duties to parents, neighbors, relatives, sick people, the elderley, and the minority group have been defined in Islam. In a Hadith recorded in Hadith Qudsi ("sacred Hadith"), it is said that God—on the Day of Judgment—will be displeased with those who do not care for the sick people, and who do not give food to those who ask. God will interrogate them and demand explanation from them. This Hadith is seen as a reminder of human beings’ obligation to respond to the needs of others.

The individual, the family, the state, and the Non-governmental organizations and the government—all are responsible for the performance of social responsibilities, and for the promotion of social welfare. The Quran tells that the believers have been sent for the betterment of mankind, that they will promote what is good, and prevent what is wrong (3:110). However, this is to be carried out in the best possible manner; no individuals honor should be injured, and no harm should arise out of it. In Islamic tradition, the family has a greater role to play in properly educating its members and providing them with moral schooling so as to make them good members of society. The state has the responsibility to preserve the human rights of its citizens while various non-government institutions in a civil society are to carry out public services and charitable works.

== Rights of various groups in Islam ==
=== Rights of the parents and relatives ===
In Islam, special importance has been attached to the service and rights of parents. Respecting and obeying one's parents has been made a religious obligation, and ill-treatment to them is forbidden in Islamic jurisprudence and Islamic tradition. With regard to the rights of parents, the Quranic injunction is to behave well with them, to take care of them especially in their old age, not to be rude to them, and to show highest respect to them. (Note: The Quran says in this regard: "Your Lord has decreed that you worship none but Him, and do good to parents. If any one of them or both of them reach old age, do not say to them a word of contempt and do not scold them, and address them with respectful words, and submit yourself before them in humility out of compassion, and say, "My Lord, be merciful to them as they have brought me up in my childhood"" (17:23-24).) This injunction is to be applied regardless of parents' religious identity, that is, a Muslim person is to respect and serve their parents whether they be Muslim or non-Muslim.

Hadith literature provides plenty of instances where Muhammad has commanded his companions to be good and kind to their parents and to serve them in the best possible manner. Insulting or misbehaving with one's parents has been declared a major sin. Mother, however, has been given priority over father in terms of receiving respect and service from children. The high status of mother in Islam is best exemplified by the saying of Muhammad that "paradise is at the feet of your mothers".

Similarly, importance has also been attached to the rights of relatives. A two-fold approach is generally prescribed with regard to the duties to the relatives: keeping good relation with them, and offering financial help if necessary. Maintaining good relation with one's relatives has been emphasized, and severing ties with them has been admonished. It is said in the Hadith: "The person who severs the bond of kinship will not enter Paradise."

=== Rights of the neighbors ===
Gabriel kept on recommending me about treating the neighbors in a kind and polite manner, so much so that I thought that he would order me to make them my heirs.

— Muhammad, Sahih al-Bukhari, 8:73:44

Islam's most sacred book—the Quran—describes true followers of its prophet as "hard against disbelievers and merciful among themselves" (Quran 48:29). However, as seen in modern discuss, Muslims believe that regardless of a neighbor's religious identity, Islam tells the Muslims to treat their neighboring people in the best possible manners and not to cause any difficulty to them. The Quran tells the Muslims to stand by their neighbors in the latter's everyday needs. Muhammad is reported as saying: "A man is not a believer who fills his stomach while his neighbor is hungry."

One Hadith on neighbors reads as follows:

Narrated Abu Shuraih: The Prophet said, "By Allah, he does not believe! By Allah, he does not believe! By Allah, he does not believe!" It was said, "Who is that, O Allah's Apostle?" He said, "That person whose neighbor does not feel safe from his evil."

=== Rights of children ===
Islamic law and the traditions of Muhammad have laid out the rights of children in Islam. Children have the rights to be fed, clothed, and protected until reaching adulthood; rights to be treated equally among the siblings; rights not to be forced by their step parents or their birth parents; and rights to education. Parents are also responsible for teaching their children basic Islamic beliefs, religious duties and good moral qualities like proper mannerism, honesty, truthfulness, modesty, and generosity. The Quran forbids harsh and oppressive treatment of orphaned children while urging kindness and justice towards them. It also condemns those who do not honor and feed the orphaned children (Quran 89:17-18).

Muhammad has been described as being very fond of children in general. In one Islamic tradition, Muhammad ran after Hussein, his grandson, in a game until he caught him. He comforted a child whose pet nightingale had died. Muhammad played many games with children, joked with them and befriended them. Muhammad also showed love to children of other religions. Once he visited his Jewish neighbor's son when the child was sick.

=== Rights of minorities ===
Today, minority rights in several Muslim countries are severely curtailed. As taught in the Quran (At-Tawbah 9:29), Jews and Christians who are called "people of the book" are to be fought until they pay Jizya and "feel themselves subdued" where Islam has the upper hand. Historically, however, non-Muslim minorities have frequently enjoyed greater freedom in Muslim lands. This is evident from its early beginnings through later caliphates, included the Ottoman and Mughal Empires.

These freedoms were enjoyed by the people of the book, as well as by other non-Muslim peoples, many of whom still live in these lands today after over 1300 years of Muslim rule. The protection of minority rights is regarded as imperative under Islamic law which is in harmony with other international laws for the minority.

=== Repudiation of racial discrimination ===
In human history, racial discrimination has long been a cause of injustice. One important aspect of Islam is that it regards human beings as "equal children of Adam". As a religion, Islam does not recognize the racial discrimination among people. In his Farewell Sermon, Muhammad repudiated the discrimination based on race and color.

Islam recognizes no distinction among human beings based on color, language or tribe. All are considered equal in receiving human rights and in discharge duties. According to Islamic teaching, no privileged or chosen class exists except those having piety or moral excellence. A Quranic injunction forbids the Muslims to underestimate others. Assuming that there will be natural differences in social status and income among individuals which is the natural outcome due to the differences in personal talents and efforts, a sense of brotherhood towards fellow Muslims and a general sense of humanity towards every human being have been suggested to be cultured to further establish equality in society.

== Economic welfare ==
=== Zakat ===
Zakat is a form of compulsory alms-giving, and a religious obligation for those Muslims who are financially affluent. They are required to pay one-fortieth (2.5%) of their total income or money each year to those Muslims who are poor and helpless. The Quran says: "And woe to those who join gods with Allah, who practice not regular charity, and who deny the Hereafter" (41:6-7). Zakat is considered by Muslims to be an act of piety through which one expresses concern for the well-being of fellow Muslims, as well as preserving social harmony between the wealthy and the poor. Zakat promotes a more equitable redistribution of wealth and fosters a sense of solidarity amongst members of the Ummah.

=== Sadaqah ===
Sadaqah means voluntary charity which is given out of compassion, love, friendship (fraternity), religious duty, or generosity. Both the Quran and the Hadith have put much emphasis on spending money for the welfare of needy people. The Quran says: "Spend something (in charity) out of the substance which We have bestowed on you, before Death should come to any of you" (63:10). One of the early teachings of Muhammad was that God expects men to be generous with their wealth and not to be miserly (Quran %3Averse%3D1 107 :1–7). Accumulating wealth without spending them to address the needs of the poor is generally prohibited and admonished.

== Moral behavior ==
Islamic tradition holds that moral qualities and good actions elevate the status of a person. The Quran and the Hadith serve as the primary source of moral and ethical guidance in Islamic theology. Both the Quran and the Hadith often speak in emphatic manners to instruct the Muslims to adopt a morally good character. In particular, respecting parents and elders, having love for the younger, greeting people in correct manner, showing kindness to fellow people, caring for the sick, asking permission before entering into others' house, speaking the truth, and avoiding rude and false speech have been emphasized.

The typical Islamic teaching is that imposing a penalty on an offender in proportion to their offense is permissible and just; but forgiving the offender is better. To go one step further by offering a favor to the offender is regarded the highest excellence. Muhammad said: "The best among you are those who have the best manners and character". To the Muslims, the examples of moral virtues set by Muhammad and his companions serve as guidance both practically and theologically.

== Cairo Declaration on Human Rights in Islam (CDHRI) ==
Adopted in Cairo, Egypt, in 1990, the Cairo Declaration on Human Rights in Islam provides an overview on the Islamic perspective on human rights, and affirms Islamic sharia as its sole source. It declares its purpose to be "general guidance for Member States of the OIC in the field of human rights". The declaration starts by saying "All men are equal in terms of basic human dignity" (but not equal "human rights") and it forbids "discrimination on the basis of race, colour, language, belief, gender, religion, political affiliation, social status or other considerations". The Declaration especially emphasizes on issues like "preservation of human life", "right to privacy", "right to marriage", prohibition of forceful conversion, protection against arbitrary arrest and torture. It also guarantees presumption of innocence until proven guilty, "full right to freedom and self-determination", and freedom of expression.

== See also ==
- Islamic ethics
- Peace in Islamic philosophy
- Human rights in Islamic countries
- Glossary of Islam
- Outline of Islam
- Index of Islam-related articles
