= Kadızade Mehmed =

Ottoman Empire Islamic preacher

Personal life
- Born: Mehmed Efendi; 1582 Balıkesir, Ottoman Empire
- Died: 1635 (aged 52–53) Istanbul, Ottoman Empire
- Notable work(s): Several treatises in Ottoman Turkish and Arabic
- Known for: Leader of the Kadizadelis, Preaching against bid'ah
- Occupation: Preacher, Theologian

Religious life
- Religion: Islam

Senior posting
- Influenced by: Muhammad Birgivi

Kadızade Mehmed Efendi, aka Küçük (Little) Kadızade or Kadızadeli (1582 Balıkesir, Ottoman Empire – 1635 Istanbul, Ottoman Empire) was an Islamic preacher in the Ottoman Empire. Those who accepted his ideas called themselves Kadızadeliler ("those for Kadızade").

The Kadızadelis were acting politically by influencing people. Those preachers that were addressing to the people could criticise the state as they wish and could cause a rebellion. One of the first and exceptional leader of the Kadızade was Kadızade Mehmed Efendi. When he was young, he tried to enroll to a tariqa, but as he found out that he objected to their thinking, he decided to become a preacher.

As his rhetoric was strong, he became famous in a short time and was designated to the Hagia Sophia Mosque as a preacher in 1631, where he pointed to disorders in state affairs. He told that all of these disorders were the result of acting against Sharia. He moved the public against sects that he decided to be contrary to Shariah. He supported the tobacco ban of Murad IV (reigned 1623–1640). When he was reminded that coffee and tobacco had not been prohibited by God, he has said that the prohibition of the ruler sufficed. The Kadızades caused the decline in Ottoman education system, and science became conservative.

== See also ==
- Kadizadeli
