= Kadizadeli =

Islamic fundamentalist movement

The Kadızadeli movement (Turkish: Kadızadeliler) was a seventeenth-century fundamentalist religious movement in the Ottoman Empire that followed Kadızade Mehmed (1582–1635), a revivalist Islamic preacher. Kadızade and his followers were determined rivals of Sufism and folk religion. They condemned many of the Ottoman practices that Kadızade felt were bid'ah or innovations, and passionately supported "reviving the beliefs and practices of the first Muslim generation in the 1st century AH" and "enjoining good and forbidding wrong."

Driven by zealous rhetoric, Kadızade Mehmed was able to inspire many followers to join in his cause and rid themselves of any and all corruption found inside the Ottoman Empire. Leaders of the movement held official positions as preachers in the major mosques of Baghdad and Istanbul, and "combined popular followings with support from within the Ottoman state apparatus." Between 1630 and 1680 there were many violent quarrels that occurred between the Kadızadelis and those whom they disapproved of. As the movement progressed, activists became "increasingly violent" and Kadızadelis were known to enter "mosques, tekkes and Ottoman coffeehouses in order to mete out punishments to those contravening their version of orthodoxy."

== Movement history ==
=== Kadızade Mehmed ===
The prototype of this movement which precedent Kadizadeli Mehmet himself already led to the prosecution by the authorities of some Sufi figures with the accusation of blasphemy and perceived threat against the Political and religious stability within the realm of the Ottoman empire. Oğlan shaykh İsmail Maşuki, an elder figure of the Bayrami-Melamī order, was executed around 1538-1539 along with his twelve followers. Following this, the executions of Shaykh Muhyī a-Dīn Kirmānī of Istanbul in 1550, and Shaykh Hamza Bāll around 1561-1562. Ebüssüud, the chief prosecutor against the Sufism, had been appointed Grand Mufti of the Ottoman in 1545 by the orders of Sultan Süleyman. He produced Fatwas that condemned Sufi rituals such as dancing.

In 1582, Kadızade was born to the son of a provincial judge in the western Anatolian town of Balıkesir. In his hometown, Kadızade studied the learned disciplines of the theologian Muhammad Birgivi (died 1573), who has been called "the inspiration of the Kadızadeli movement"; he then in due course prepared his way to the imperial capital Istanbul. It is in Istanbul where he engaged in a career as a mosque preacher, through "the path of sermon and admonition," conversely he eventually neglected the prudish teachings of his Balıkesir guides. It became apparent that Kadızadeli movement and Sufis were unable to get along, and even though Muhammad Birgivi was himself a Bayrami Sufi in his formative years, Kadızade’s temperament and his religious predilections were determined to be unsuited to Sufism. His debates with Sufis first attracted attention when he debated with Pir Sivas Efendi. After serving as imam at the Sultan Murad Mosque in Istanbul for a few years, he became the imam at the Yavuz Sultan Selim Mosque and regularly delivered anti-Sufism sermons during Friday sermons.

He soon returned to his former career as a preacher by implementing a more strict approach to "sermon and admonition" together. Kadızade gradually became the most active antagonist of Sufism. He continued to be a religious instructor for many years at the Murat Pasha Mosque, Aksaray, Istanbul, where he was also appointed as a Friday preacher at the Yavuz Selim Mosque "in recognition of his gifts of expression and grace of delivery."

In 1631, Kadızade served as a Friday preacher at Beyazid for eight years and at Suleymaniye for one or two months, he was then promoted to Aya Sofya, the imperial mosque. "It was clear that for a growing segment of the mosque-going public, Kadizade had become the instrument of their escape from the hellish depths of ignorance." Kadizade's speech-making had permeated "new life into the centuries old dialectic between innovation and fundamental 'orthodox' Islam" yet his "underlying struggle laid between Kadizadeli Puritanism and the pragmatism of ulema decision-makers" and this was something Kadizade fought hard to bridge the gap between. At first, in order to quell resentment and rebellion, as well as to settle down the Kadizadelis, Murad IV worked with Kadizade Mehmed and suppressed the most blatant displays of luxury and aberrant behaviour. This however did not prevent the Kadizadelis agitation toward the Ottoman Empire and "in 1656, after the appointment of Koprulu Mehmed to the Grand Vezirate, the Kadizadeli wave ended." They were able to influence the Sultan to impose certain prohibitions concerning the Mevlevi and Halveti orders. In 1666, Mehmed IV banned the Mevlevi sema rituals and the Halveti dervishes' rituals, known to the Kadızadeli as "thumping on the throne.".

The Kadızadeli movement erupted in response to the challenge that the Sufis and their ulema had come to be known as the standard for mosque preachers. The Kadızadeli vaizan or preachers, were not men from the ulema ranking hierarchy. They were mosque preachers that corresponded to an assortment of less significant religious career pursuits. The Kadızadeli vaizan were extremely popular amongst the populace and persuasive preachers because they tended to remark on the modern-day scene, often involving distinct individuals into account.

In the words of Madeline C. Zilfi:

The Kadizadeli offensive against innovation (bid'ah), and against folk religion generally, was an outgrowth of the uncompromising hostility of Istanbul's premier Friday mosque preachers, led by Kadızade Mehmed b. Mustafa, toward certain of the empire's major Sufi orders, was symbolized in Kadızade's day by the Halveti shaikh Ebulhayr Mecdeddin Abulmedid, known as Sivasi Efendi (d. 1639). The debate that Kadızade and Sivasi stirred in Istanbul during their lifetimes continued to spill over to other Ottoman cities and to subsequent generations long after the original antagonists were dead.

== Kadızadeli ideology ==
The Kadizadeli movement, which emerged in the 17th-century Ottoman Empire, has been the subject of scholarly debate regarding its potential ideological and theological connections with Wahhabism, the Islamic reformist movement founded by Muhammad ibn Abd al-Wahhab in the 18th century. Both movements share a puritanical approach to Islam, emphasizing a return to what they perceived as the unadulterated practices of the early Muslim community (Salaf).

Kadizade in his sermons "used the grand pulpit of Aya Sofya to propagate a kind of fundamentalist ethic, a set of doctrinal positions intended to rid Islam of beliefs and practices that had accumulated since the era of the Prophet Muhammad’s Medina." Kadizade's sermons and his persuasive style of delivery permeated "new life into the centuries-old dialect between innovation and fundamental, "orthodox," Islam".

In addition, the Kadızadeli movement specified precise Quran sanctions against wine and had sermons paying attention to a variety of controversies that had progressed during the Prophet Muhammad era. The Kadizadelis took the negative pose and argued that the "issues typified the contagion of Sufi-inspired error." Moreover, with respect to religious obligations, the Kadızadelis asserted that every single believer was obligated to comply with the Koran's law sanctioning to "enjoin right and forbid wrong." Besides, the Kadizadelis contended that those who rejected to abandon such innovations were "heretics who must reaffirm their faith or be punished." According to the Sufi spokesmen, and others opposed to the Kadızadeli movement, “Kadızadeli-labeled "innovation" was either not canonically forbidden or had flourished for centuries within the community and thus stood validated by the principle of consensus.”

=== Kadızadeli criticisms ===
According to Mustapha Sheikh, under the leadership of Uṣṭūwanī, attacks on un-Islamic behaviour were not left to the authorities. One preacher (Al-Aqḥiṣāri) urged his followers to physically remove from the pulpit any preacher whose sermon is "not conforming the Quran and Sunnah." As the movement progressed, activists became "increasingly violent" and Kadızadelis were known to enter "mosques, tekkes and coffeehouses in order to mete out punishments to those contravening their version of orthodoxy." In the writings of the members of the Kadizadeli movement, they subjected this issue of Bid'ah (heresy) through strict investigation in accordance with the Qur'an and Hadith. They criticized the Sufis methodologies which lacking any reference to those traditional sources.

The Kadızadelis protested against Ottoman expenditures, especially military expenditures, which they felt were financially and morally bankrupting the society itself. The Kadızadelis argued that substances such as "coffee, tobacco, opium, and other drugs" must be denounced. Moreover, practices such as "singing, chanting, musical accompaniment, dancing, whirling, and similar rhythmic movement in Sufi ceremonies for the "recollection" of God must also be banned. In addition, "other damning usages, according to Kadızadelis, included pilgrimages to the tombs of alleged saints; invocations of blessings upon the Prophet and his Companions upon each mention of their names; collective supererogatory prayers and rituals of post-patriarchal origins; the vilification of the Umayyad Caliph Yazid; the use of bribery among officeholders; and grasping hands and bowing down before social superiors". According to Kadızadelis, those who rejected to abandon such innovations were "heretics who must reaffirm their faith or be punished."

Furthermore, the Kadizadeli preachers, who has gained had gained influence in the court of sultan Mehmed IV, also forbade wine consumption. A rare case of stoning to death for adultery took place during the height of Kadizadeli. During this period, which coincided with the Jewish millenarian Sabbatai Zevi movement, many Jews had been forced to convert to Islam.

The Kadızadelis promoted their ideals in the mosques "for public support of an activist, interventionist, 'enjoining right and forbidding wrong', and demanded of their congregations not only that they purify their own lives, but that they seek out sinners and in effect force them back onto the straight path." The Kadızadelis also voiced their opinions in Friday sermons, learned treaties, and public confrontations, hammering away at the Sufi movement. Palace scandals were also another issue the Kadızadelis felt strongly about and felt that it weakened the image of Islam to "others". The Kadızadelis believed that Sufism was an aberration of Islam and thus had no place in Ottoman society. However, "the Sufi side was defended by dignitaries who were not Sufi at all. The Kadızadelis, meanwhile, was directed by a leadership so narrow that it seldom represented the official guardians of Sharia orthodoxy, the principal ulema of the realm."

However, Mehmed was not excessively "fond of the Sufis and their practices; he felt Kadizadeli vigilantism was more threatening to his vision of order." "It came at a crucial time as well since an armed Kadizadeli movement had made their way towards the Fatih mosque. Koprulu Mehmed acted swiftly, arresting then banishing off key members to Cyprus."

Among other practices which condemned by the Kadizadelis were including the tomb pilgrimage or Grave worshipper amount Sufi, cursing of Yazid I, supererogatory prayer, and the teaching of Ibn Arabi, among others.

=== Relationship with Wahhabism ===
Kadizadeli scholars, such as Kadızade Mehmed (d. 1635), were known for their strict interpretation of Islamic texts and their opposition to practices they deemed innovations (bid'ah), such as Sufi rituals, the veneration of saints, and the use of coffee and tobacco. Similarly, Muhammad ibn Abd al-Wahhab advocated for the purification of Islam from what he considered corrupting influences, including certain Sufi practices and popular religious customs.

Some scholars have suggested that the Kadizadeli movement may have indirectly influenced the development of Wahhabism, particularly through the transmission of ideas across the Islamic world. The Ottoman Empire, which encompassed much of the Arabian Peninsula, served as a conduit for the exchange of religious ideas. While there is no direct evidence of a lineal connection between the two movements, the similarities in their reformist agendas and their shared emphasis on scriptural literalism have led to speculation about a possible ideological kinship.

According to James Muhammad Dawud Currie in the article "Kadizadeli, Ottoman Scholarship, Muhammad ibn Abd al-Wahhab, and the Rise of the Saudi State", the Kadizadeli movement's emphasis on purging Islam of perceived innovations may have laid the groundwork for later reformist movements, including Wahhabism. The author notes that both movements emerged in contexts of social and political upheaval, which may have contributed to their rigid interpretations of Islamic doctrine. However, the author also cautions against overstating the connection, as the historical and geographical contexts of the two movements differ significantly.

In summary, while the Kadizadeli movement and Wahhabism share certain theological and ideological similarities, the extent of their historical connection remains a matter of scholarly debate. Further research is needed to explore the potential influence of Kadizadeli thought on the development of Wahhabism and other Islamic reformist movements.
