= Muhammad Birgivi =

Islamic scholar

Personal life
- Born: March 1523 Balıkesir, Ottoman Empire
- Died: 1573 İzmir, Ottoman Empire

Religious life
- Religion: Islam
- Denomination: Sunni
- Jurisprudence: Hanafi (with Hanbali influences)
- Tariqa: Bayrami
- Creed: Maturidi

Muslim leader
- Influenced by: Abu Hanifa, al-Maturidi, Ahmad ibn Taymiyyah
- Influenced: Kadızade Mehmed

Muhammad Birgivi (1523–1573), full name Taqī al-Dīn Muhammad ibn Pīr ʿAlī al-Birgivi and known simply as Imam Birgivi, was a Hanafi Muslim jurist and scholar who lived during the rule of the Ottoman Empire in Anatolia.

== Life ==
Imam Birgivi was born in 1523 at Balıkesir, but learned and studied his religion in Constantinople. He also became a member of the Bayrami order of Sufism.

Imam Birgivi and his disciples were vocal critics of degeneracy within the Ottoman Empire, particularly decrying the twisting of Islamic teachings for the benefit of the rich. At one point Birgivi traveled to the capital of the Empire and personally took the prime minister to task. This reprimand was taken well by the minister, who consulted him on how to cure the degeneracy affecting the Islamic values. One of his biggest supporters in the Ottoman court was Sokollu Mehmed Pasha.

He stayed in İzmir, working there as a religious teacher, until his death in 1573. He was buried in the private cemetery named after him, the İmam-î Birgivi Hazretleri Kabri, which is adjacent to a religious school complex named after him.

== Views ==
Imam Birgivi was a Maturidi in creed, and a Hanafi in his jurisprudence and doctrine. However, Birgivi was against the usage of Kalam and found it unnecessary. Birgivi's views of Sufism were influenced by Ibn Taymiyyah, and his writings also influenced the Kadizadeli movement which opposed Sufism.

Birgivi was a critic of Ibn Arabi and refuted him on theological standpoints, including the faith of the Pharaoh of the Exodus.

== Works ==
Birgivi is famous for his eṭ-Ṭarîḳatü' l-Muḥammediyye, a book which explains his views on Sufism, innovations, Islamic sects and Prophetic traditions, through the viewpoints of the Hanafi school and the Maturidi creed. Some of his views in the book were inspired by Ibn Taymiyyah.

In addition to eṭ-Ṭarîḳatü' l-Muḥammediyye, Birgivi also wrote books on language, grammar, and the etiquette when visiting graves.

== See also ==
- Kadızade Mehmed
- List of Hanafis
- List of Maturidis
