= Hadith of Gabriel =

Ninth-century hadith in Sunni Islam

In Sunni Islam, the Hadith of Gabriel (also known as Ḥadīth Jibrīl) is a hadith of the Islamic prophet Muhammad (the last prophet of Islam) which expresses the religion of Islam in a concise manner. It is believed to contain a summary of the core of the religion of Islam, which are:

1. Islām (إسلام), which is described with the "Five Pillars of Islam,"
2. Īmān (إيمان), which is described with the "Six Articles of Faith,"
3. Iḥsān (إحسان), or "doing what is beautiful," and
4. al-Sā’ah (الساعة), or The Hour, which is not described, but its signs are given.

This hadith is found in both the Ṣaḥīḥ al-Bukhārī and the Ṣaḥīḥ Muslim collections. It has been named "Ḥadīth Jibrīl" (Hadith of Gabriel) by Islamic scholars because the archangel Gabriel appears to Muhammad and those around him in a human form.

== Ṣaḥīḥ al-Bukhārī version ==
Narrated Abu Huraira: One day while the Prophet (ﷺ ['ALLAH bless him and grant him salvation']) was sitting in the company of some people, (The angel) Gabriel came and asked, "What is faith?" Allah's Messenger (ﷺ) replied, 'Faith is to believe in Allah, His angels, (the) meeting with Him, His Apostles, and to believe in Resurrection." Then he further asked, "What is Islam?" Allah's Messenger (ﷺ) replied, "To worship Allah Alone and none else, to offer prayers perfectly, to pay the compulsory charity (Zakat) and to observe fasts during the month of Ramadan." Then he further asked, "What is Ihsan (perfection)?" Allah's Messenger (ﷺ) replied, "To worship Allah as if you see Him, and if you cannot achieve this state of devotion then you must consider that He is looking at you." Then he further asked, "When will the Hour be established?" Allah's Messenger (ﷺ) replied, "The answerer has no better knowledge than the questioner. But I will inform you about its portents.

1. When a slave (lady) gives birth to her master.

2. When the shepherds of black camels start boasting and competing with others in the construction of higher buildings.

And the Hour is one of five things which nobody knows except Allah. The Prophet (ﷺ) then recited: "Knowledge of the Hour [of Resurrection] belongs to ALLAH; it is He who sends down the relieving rain and He who knows what is hidden in the womb. No soul knows what it will reap tomorrow, and no soul knows in what land it will die; it is God who is all knowing and all aware." (Surah Luqman 31:34) Then that man (Gabriel) left and the Prophet (ﷺ) asked his companions to call him back, but they could not see him. Then the Prophet (ﷺ) said, "That was Gabriel (A) who came to teach the people their religion." Abu 'Abdullah said: He (the Prophet) considered all that as a part of faith.

— Ṣaḥīḥ al-Bukhārī, Beliefs (Book 2), Ḥadīth 43

== Ṣaḥīḥ Muslim version ==
It is narrated on the authority of Yahya b. Ya'mur that the first man who discussed qadr (Divine Decree) in Basra was Ma'bad al-Juhani. I along with Humaid b. 'Abdur-Rahman Himyari set out for pilgrimage or for 'Umrah and said: Should it so happen that we come into contact with one of the Companions of the Messenger of Allah (peace be upon him) we shall ask him about what is talked about taqdir (Divine Decree). Accidentally we came across Abdullah ibn Umar ibn al-Khattab, while he was entering the mosque. My companion and I surrounded him. One of us (stood) on his right and the other stood on his left. I expected that my companion would authorize me to speak. I therefore said: Abu Abdur Rahman! There have appeared some people in our land who recite the Qur'an and pursue knowledge. And then after talking about their affairs, added: They (such people) claim that there is no such thing as Divine Decree and events are not predestined. He (Abdullah ibn Umar) said: When you happen to meet such people tell them that I have nothing to do with them and they have nothing to do with me. And verily they are in no way responsible for my (belief). Abdullah ibn Umar swore by Him (the Lord) (and said): If any one of them (who does not believe in the Divine Decree) had with him gold equal to the bulk of (the mountain) Uhud and spent it (in the way of Allah), Allah would not accept it unless he affirmed his faith in Divine Decree.

He further said: My father, Umar ibn al-Khattab, told me: One day we were sitting in the company of Allah's Apostle (peace be upon him) when there appeared before us a man dressed in pure white clothes, his hair extraordinarily black. There were no signs of travel on him. None amongst us recognized him. At last he sat with the Apostle (peace be upon him) He knelt before him placed his palms on his thighs and said: Muhammad, inform me about al-Islam. The Messenger of Allah (peace be upon him) said: Al-Islam implies that you testify that there is no god but Allah and that Muhammad is the messenger of Allah, and you establish prayer, pay Zakat, observe the fast of Ramadan, and perform pilgrimage to the (House) if you are solvent enough (to bear the expense of) the journey. He (the inquirer) said: You have told the truth. He (Umar ibn al-Khattab) said: It amazed us that he would put the question and then he would himself verify the truth. He (the inquirer) said: Inform me about Iman (faith). He (the Holy Prophet) replied: That you affirm your faith in Allah, in His angels, in His Books, in His Apostles, in the Day of Judgment, and you affirm your faith in the Divine Decree about good and evil. He (the inquirer) said: You have told the truth. He (the inquirer) again said: Inform me about al-Ihsan (performance of good deeds). He (the Holy Prophet) said: That you worship Allah as if you are seeing Him, for though you don't see Him, He, verily, sees you.

He (the enquirer) again said: Inform me about the hour (of the Doom). He (the Holy Prophet) remarked: One who is asked knows no more than the one who is inquiring (about it). He (the inquirer) said: Tell me some of its indications. He (the Holy Prophet) said: That the slave-girl will give birth to her mistress and master, that you will find barefooted, destitute goat-herds vying with one another in the construction of magnificent buildings. He (the narrator, Umar ibn al-Khattab) said: Then he (the inquirer) went on his way but I stayed with him (the Holy Prophet) for a long while. He then, said to me: Umar, do you know who this inquirer was? I replied: Allah and His Apostle knows best. He (the Holy Prophet) remarked: He was Gabriel (the angel). He came to you in order to instruct you in matters of religion.

— Ṣaḥīḥ Muslim, Faith (Book 1), Ḥadīth 1
