= Adab (Islam) =

Etiquette and morality in Islam

- Arabic: أدب
- Romanization: Adab
- Literal meaning: Behavior

Adab (Arabic: أدب) in the context of behavior, refers to prescribed Islamic etiquette: "refinement, good manners, morals, decorum, decency, humaneness". Al-Adab (Arabic: الآداب) has been defined as "decency, morals".

While interpretation of the scope and particulars of Adab may vary among different cultures, common among these interpretations is regard for personal standing through the observation of certain codes of behavior. To exhibit Adab would be to show "proper discrimination of correct order, behavior, and taste".

Islam has rules of etiquette and an ethical code involving every aspect of life. Muslims refer to Adab as good manners, courtesy, respect, and appropriateness, covering acts such as entering or exiting a washroom, posture when sitting, and cleansing oneself.

== Customs and behaviour ==
Muslims are generally taught to follow some specific customs in their daily lives. Most of these customs can be traced back to Abrahamic traditions in pre-Islamic Arabian society. Due to Muhammad's sanction or tacit approval of such practices, these customs are considered to be Sunnah (practices of Muhammad as part of the religion) by the Ummah (Muslim nation). It includes customs like:

- Saying bismillah ("in the name of Allah") before eating and drinking.
- Drinking in 3 gulps slowly
- Using the right hand for drinking and eating.
- Saying as-salamu alaykum ("peace be upon you") when greeting someone, and replying wa alaykumu s-salam.
- Saying alhamdulillah ("praise Allah") when sneezing, and replying yarhamukallah ("may Allah have mercy on you").
- In the sphere of hygiene, it includes:
  - Clipping the moustache
  - Removing armpit and pubic hair
  - Clipping nails
  - Circumcising male children
  - Cleaning the nostrils, the mouth, and the teeth
  - Cleaning the body after urination and defecation
- Not entering a host's home until one has made sure their presence is welcome (hatta tasta nisu)
- Abstention from sexual relations during the menstrual cycle and the puerperal discharge,^{[Quran 2:222]} and ceremonial bath after the menstrual cycle and Janabah (seminal/ovular discharge or sexual intercourse).^{[Quran 4:43]}^{[Quran 5:6]}
- Burial rituals include funeral prayer of bathed and enshrouded body in coffin cloth and burying it in a grave.

The list above is far from comprehensive. As Islam sees itself as both a way of life than a religion, Islamic adab is concerned with all areas of an individual's life, not merely the list mentioned above.

== Etymology ==
The term simply meant "behavior" in pre-Islamic Arabia, although it included other norms and habits of conduct. The term does not appear very often in the 7th century (1st Islamic century). With the spread of Islam, it acquired a meaning of "practical ethics" (rather than directly religious strictures) around the 8th century. By the 9th century (3rd Islamic century), its connotations had expanded, especially when used as a loanword in Islamic non-Arab regions.

It became a loose term to describe actions and knowledge expected of a civilized and cultured Muslim; proper conduct, knowledge of Arabic literature and poetry, and rhetorical eloquence. Among the lower strata of society, it acquired something of its modern meanings of civility, courtesy, manners, and decency. Islamic religious scholars applied the term to cover a whole range of appropriate behavior, and the term frequently appears in Hadiths.

The term became popular and used in many contexts; for example, in the 10th century, the Brethren of Purity (Ikhwān al-Ṣafā) devoted much text to their philosophical exploration of the adab, and Abu Hayyan al-Tawhidi wrote extensively on the topic. Abu Ishaq al-Tha'labi also wrote extensively, drawing a program for society and human conduct in general in his work based on Adab.

The related term Tadīb is the verb form where Adab is trained or taught to another.

== Examples in hadiths encouraging Adab ==
=== Hadiths ===
==== Sunni Hadith ====
Abu 'Amr ash-Shaybani said:

"The owner of this house (and he pointed at the house of 'Abdullah ibn Mas'ud) said, "I asked the Prophet, may Allah bless him and grant him peace, which action Allah loves best. He replied, 'Prayer at its proper time.' 'Then what?' I asked. He said, 'Then kindness to parents." I asked, 'Then what?' He replied, 'Then fighting towards (Jihad in) the Way of God (Allah).'" He added, "He told me about these things. If I had asked him to tell me more, he would have told me more."

—Kitab al-Adab al-Mufrad p. 29

==== Shia Hadith ====
Ali ibn Abi Talib, the first Shia Imam, said:

"Whoever leads the people must discipline others in his own way, deeds, and behavior before disciplining others with his language, and his instructor and educator deserve more respect than the educator and educator of the people."

Ali ibn Husayn Zayn al-Abidin said: "It is your child's right to bring him up with good manners and morals".

== Literature ==
A class of literature known as Adab is found in Islamic history. These were works written on the proper etiquette, manners for various professions and for ordinary Muslims, (examples include "manuals of advice for kings on how to rule and for physicians on how to care for patients"), and also works of fiction literature that provide moral exemplars within their stories.

== See also ==
- Glossary of Islam
- Outline of Islam
- Index of Islam-related articles
- Etiquette in the Middle East
- List of Islamic terms in Arabic
- Lexicon
