= Ihsan =

Islamic concept of social responsibility

Ihsan (Arabic: إحسان ʾiḥsān, also romanized ehsan) is an Arabic term meaning "to do beautiful things", "beautification", "perfection", or "excellence" (Arabic: husn, lit. 'beauty'). Ihsan is a matter of taking one's inner faith (iman) and showing it in both deed and action, a sense of social responsibility born from religious convictions.

== Meaning ==
In Islam, Ihsan is the Muslim responsibility to obtain perfection, or excellence, in worship, such that Muslims try to worship God as if they see Him, and although they cannot see Him, they undoubtedly believe that He is constantly watching over them. That definition comes from the Hadith of Gabriel in which Muhammad states: "[Ihsan is] to worship God as though you see Him, and if you cannot see Him, then indeed He sees you". (Al-Bukhari and al-Muslim). According to Muhammad's hadith "God has written ihsan on everything".

== In relation to Islam and iman ==
Ihsan is one of the three dimensions of the Islamic religion (ad-din):

1. Islam – voluntary submission to God, expressed in practicing the five pillars of islam.
2. Iman – belief in the six articles of faith.
3. Ihsan – attaining perfection or excellence in the deployment of righteousness on Earth. This includes doing good things for the benefit of others, such as supporting the oppressed and vulnerable.

In contrast to the emphases of Islam (what one should do) and iman (why one should do), the concept of ihsan is primarily associated with intention. One who "does what is beautiful" is called a muhsin. It is generally held that a person can only achieve true Ihsan with the help and guidance of God, who governs all things. While traditionally Islamic jurists have concentrated on Islam and theologians on iman, the Sufis have focused their attention on ihsan. Those who are muhsin are a subset of those who are mu'min, and those who are mu'min are a subset of Muslims:

"From the preceding discussion it should be clear that not every Muslim is a man or woman of faith (mu'min), but every person of faith is a Muslim. Furthermore, a Muslim who believes in all the principles of Islam may not necessarily be a righteous person, a doer of good (muhsin), but a truly good and righteous person is both a Muslim and a true person of faith."

— Ayoub (2004), p. 54

Some Islamic scholars explain ihsan as being the inner dimension of Islam whereas sharia is often described as the outer dimension. Ihsan "constitutes the highest form of worship" (ibadah). It is excellence in work and in social interactions. For example, ihsan includes sincerity during Muslim prayers and being grateful to parents, family, and God.

== See also ==
- Glossary of Islam
- Outline of Islam
- Index of Islam-related articles
