= Nasir al-Din Nasir Hunzai =

Ismaili Pakistani writer and poet

Partaw-i Shah Nasir al-Din Nasir Hubb-i 'Ali Hunzai SI
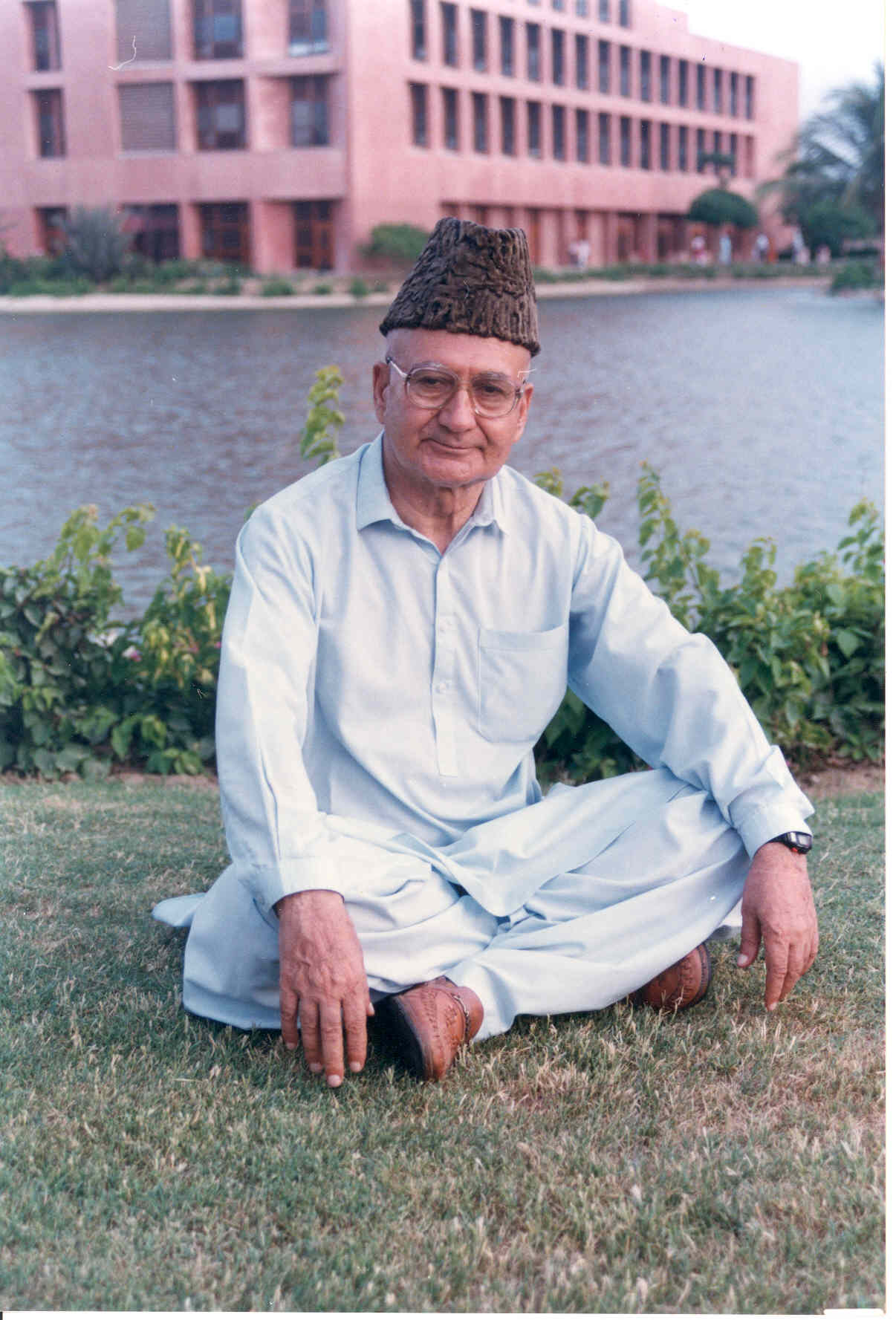
- 'Allamah Hunzai pictured in front of the Aga Khan University Hospital, Karachi.

Personal life
- Born: Partaw-i Shah; 15 May 1917 Hyderabad, Hunza, British India (now in Gilgit-Baltistan, Pakistan)
- Died: 15 January 2017 Austin, Texas, United States
- Main interests: Islamic theology; Metaphysics; Hermeneutics; Teleology; Poetry; Linguistics; Lexicography
- Occupation: Theologian; Philosopher; lexicographer; Linguist; Poet
- Honours: Sitara-i-Imtiaz (2001); Hakim al-Qalam (1996); Baba-yi Burushaski; Lisan al-Qawm; Supreme Scientist

Religious life
- Religion: Shia Islam
- Denomination: Isma'ilism
- School: Nizari Ismaili

Partaw-i Shah Nasir al-Din Nasir Hubb-i 'Ali Hunzai (15 May 1917 – 14 January 2017), known also as 'Allamah (lit. learned) Hunzai,, 'Allamah Sahib, or by his epithets, Baba-yi Burushaski (lit. The Father of Burushaski), Lisan al-Qawm (lit. The Nation's Spokesman) and Hakim al-Qalam (lit. The Sage of the Pen), was a 20th and 21st century theologian, philosopher, Isma'ili scholar, poet and linguist known for his work on Islamic theology, metaphysics, hermeneutics, poetry and the Burushaski language. His over 100 works of theological and philosophical prose thoroughly repurpose and build extensively upon classical Isma'ili thought, setting forth original theological, metaphysical and teleological expositions, based on the historically unprecedented philosophical injunctions of the 48th Isma'ili Imam, Sultan Muhammad Shah. These works also constitute a vast corpus of original Isma'ili esoteric exegesis, which reflects a deeper engagement with the process of ta'wil (lit. to bring a thing back to its origin) than can be found in previous Isma'ili hermeneutical works. He was also an engaged socio-political activist, advocating for female education and women's rights, cultural pluralism and language preservation.

== Early life ==
Hunzai was born in Haidarabad village, in the state of Hunza (now Gilgit-Baltistan, Pakistan), around 17 May 1917. His family had held ministerial posts in the state at various times and had also served the Isma'ili mission (da'wa).

Though the rural context to which he was born offered him little in the way of formal education, 'Allamah Hunzai's zeal for self-study earnt him proficiency in Burushaski, Urdu, Arabic and Classical Persian, which allowed him to study manuscripts collected by his father and other local scholars, including, among others, Khusraw's Wajh-i Din (which he later translated into Urdu), Jami' al-Hikmatayn and Zad al-Musafirin, and Ja'far b. Mansur's Sara'ir wa-Asrar al-Nutaqa - some of the most complex in their genre. As a result, he became well-versed in classical Isma'ili Neoplatonic philosophy and hermeneutics before having even reached the end of puberty. This early phase of inquisition also saw him take to poetry, with Sa'di's Bustan, Gulistan and Karima, as well as Hafiz-i Shirazi's Divan and Rumi's Kulliyat-i Shams included in his father's collection of manuscripts.

During this early phase, 'Allamah Hunzai was forced to take up shepherding in order to sustain his family. He would later recall how he used to carry his herding-stick in one hand, and the Qur'an in the other, which he studied with great avidity, and began to develop original theological and hermeneutical positions over its injunctions.

== Military life ==
'Allamah Hunzai was recruited into the Gilgit Scouts on 8 April 1939, aged 21. He recalls having become "habituated" to seeking knowledge as a result of nurturing the zeal he possessed therefor during his days as a shepherd, and he thus continued to study books on classical philosophy and poetry during his leisure time.

It was during his service in the Gilgit Scouts that 'Allamah Hunzai began to compose poetry, beginning with his mother-tongue, Burushaski (for more on 'Allamah Hunzai's poetry, see the section entitled 'Poetry'). Prior to him, however, Burushaski had been a broken, oral tongue, and there did not exist a script with which to write in the language. As one of the world's 129 language isolates, Burushaski possesses unique sounds, grammar and syntax, and to account for these, 'Allamah Hunzai - whilst in his first year of service in the Gilgit Scouts - developed his own Burushaski script, using an Arabic base to which he added eight special letters and ten vowel symbols (for more on 'Allamah Hunzai's contribution to the Burushaski language, see the section on Burushaski'). Using this script, 'Allamah Hunzai wrote the first known Burushaski poem in 1940, which is still widely recited today. 'Allamah Hunzai jests at his misfortune in the absence of a photocopier in 1940, because the popularity of his poem within the Gilgit Scouts meant having to hand-write hundreds of copies of the poem upon request from his peers, who wished to take it home to their families. Among these peers were sergeants Tahwil Shah and Hasan 'Ali, who recited the poem with rhythm and melody. Thus began the tradition of Burushaski poetry and its recitation, which is today part of everyday life in Hunza.

'Allamah Hunzai resigned from the Gilgit Scouts on 1 September 1943, and joined the British Indian army in Srinagar on 5 October in the same year. He was released on his own request therefrom on 7 February 1946, and set off for Bombay, where the Diamond Jubilee of the 48th Isma'ili Imam, Sultan Muhammad Shah, was to take place.

== Philosophy, theology and hermeneutics ==
Across over 150 works of prose, 'Allamah Hunzai thoroughly repurposes and builds extensively upon classical Isma'ili thought, with original theological, metaphysical and teleological expositions that draw on the historically unprecedented philosophical injunctions of the 48th Isma'ili Imam, Sultan Muhammad Shah. In addition, his works constitute a vast corpus of original Isma'ili esoteric exegesis, which reflects a deeper engagement with the process of ta'wil (lit. to return a thing to its origin) than can be found in previous Isma'ili hermeneutical works. These aspects of his works are very briefly elaborated upon below:

=== Metaphysics ===
Among the historically unprecedented philosophical injunctions of the 48th Isma'ili Imam is his declaration that "Islam's basic principle can only be defined as monorealism and not as monotheism". Drawing on this injunction and others, 'Allamah Hunzai develops a monistic metaphysical framework wherein the absence of an ontological barrier between mind and matter offers a solution to the problem of causal interaction that plagues much of substance dualist philosophy, whilst still accounting for their difference with respect to properties, inasmuch as his framework posits one.

=== Teleology ===
'Allamah Hunzai's monistic metaphysical framework lays the foundation for his teleological expositions, which build extensively upon the notion of the Neoplatonic Second's return to perfection, demonstrating its eventual superiority over the First to be part of its telos, and positing an individualistic context to which the scale of the Neoplatonic regression applies.

=== Theology ===
'Allamah Hunzai affirms and extensively develops the notion of the carnal soul's annihilation - which also features heavily in his hermeneutics - but also posits an original exposition of the rational soul's annihilation, drawing on the recurring notion of a two-fold process of ontological return throughout the sayings of the Prophets. For 'Allamah Hunzai, it is this second annihilation that marks one's fana' in and baqa' with God.

=== Hermeneutics ===
Past Isma'ili hermeneutical works deal primarily with interpreting scriptural symbolism by appeal to the phenomena of the hierarchy in which the Isma'ili summons was ordered, known as the hudud al-din. Doubt was thus cast on the relevancy of this past corpus of exegesis following the 48th Isma'ili Imam's abolishment of this physical hierarchy. 'Allamah Hunzai's corpus of esoteric exegesis both extensively expands and saves the Isma'ili hermeneutical tradition from the charge of redundancy, by elucidating scriptural parables with respect to the phenomena in and between an individual's quadripartite soul, offering a deeper return (ta'wil) of scriptural symbolism in doing so.

== Poetry ==
'Allamah Hunzai wrote the first known Burushaski poem in 1940 during his service in the Gilgit Scouts, and thereafter continued to compose scores of poems in Burushaski, Urdu and Persian, which spanned a range of devotional and philosophical genres. In 1951, he began to compose poetry in Uighur, having mastered the language during his missionary work in Xinjiang. In 1961, 'Allamah Hunzai published his first poetry collection, entitled Nagmah-yi Israfil, which featured a selection of his Burushaski poems. The collection was telegrammed in the same year to the 49th Isma'ili Imam, Shah Karim al-Husayni, who, in his response, ascribed to 'Allamah Hunzai's collection the status of a "ginan book in the Burushaski language'. As the late van-Skyhawk notes, this had the effect of sacralising 'Allamah Hunzai's poetry for the Isma'ilis, and thus his poems were and continue to be widely recited in Isma'ili jama'at-khanas following this exchange. 'Allamah Hunzai went on to publish numerous further poetry collections, including his Manzumat-i Nasiri, Jawahir-i Ma'arif and Bihishte Asqurin, which amalgamated his Burushaski, Urdu, Persian and Uighur poetry, as well as his Diwan-i Nasiri - the first Diwan of poetry in Burushaski. In 1980, a Latin-script transliteration of this Diwan was published, having been rendered by Professors Ettiene Tiffou and Yves Charles Morin of the University of Montréal, who had prior to this approached 'Allamah Hunzai for assistance with their research on the Burushaski language. In addition to his Burushaski Diwan, 'Allamah Hunzai also published a twelve-volume Urdu Diwan, comprising thousands of poems. In 1996, a selection of 'Allamah Hunzai's Uighur, Urdu, Persian and Burushaski poems was chosen to feature in an anthology of Isma'ili poetry entitled Shimmering Light, published by I.B. Tauris in association with the Institute of Isma'ili Studies.

=== Renditions ===
Musical of renditions of 'Allamah Hunzai's poetry have amassed millions of views across the several streaming platforms to which they have been shared. Bayan's 2016 hit, Raz-i Fitna, is a rendition of an Urdu poem published in 'Allamah Hunzai's Guldastah-yi Irfan.

== Honours ==
- Sitara-i-Imtiaz (Star of Excellence), awarded by the President of Pakistan on 23 March 2001 in recognition of his outstanding contributions to literature.

== International Recognition ==
Allama Nasir al-Din Nasir Hunzai received international recognition for his scholarly and spiritual contributions. He was included in the International Award of Recognition and was listed among the “5000 Personalities of the World” (Edition 6). This recognition acknowledged his work in discovering spiritual science and preserving cultural heritage, highlighting his influence beyond regional and national boundaries.

== Acknowledgement by U.S. President Barack Obama ==
In December 2016, United States President Barack Obama sent a congratulatory letter to Allama Nasir al-Din Nasir Hunzai on the occasion of his 100th birth anniversary.

In the letter from the White House, President Obama expressed his pleasure in joining Hunzai’s family and admirers in wishing him a happy 100th birthday and noted that his scholarly work had the potential to broaden people’s vision in the years to come. Obama also acknowledged the courage and perseverance of Hunzai’s generation through historical challenges.
