= Fana (Sufism) =

Annihilation of sef in Sufism

Fanaa (Arabic: فناء fanāʾ ) in Sufism, a body within Islam, is the "passing away" or "annihilation" (of the self). Fana means "to die before one dies", a concept highlighted by famous notable Persian mystics such as Rumi. There is controversy around what Fana exactly is, with some Sufis defining it as the absolute annihilation of the human ego before God, whereby the self becomes an instrument of God's plan in the world (Baqaa).

Other Sufis also interpret it as breaking down of the individual ego and a recognition of the fundamental unity of God, creation, and the individual self. However, persons having entered this enlightened state are said to obtain absolute awareness of an intrinsic unity (Tawhid) between God and all that exists, including the individual themselves.

== Views ==
Similar to other Sufi doctrines, Fana is based on first-party Islamic teachings. Specifically, the Quran says:

"All things in creation suffer annihilation and there remains the face of the Lord in its majesty and bounty."

— Ar-Rahman 55, 26-27

=== Fana as Vision ===
Mystics such as Al-Junayd al-Baghdadi, Al-Ghazali and Al-Sarraj maintained that this ultimate goal of Sufism was the vision (mushahadah) of the divine.

Fana was defined by Abu Nasr as-Sarraj thus:

The passing away of the attributes of the lower self (nafs) and the passing away of the repugnance to, and reliance upon, anything that may happen.

— Al-Sarraj, Kitab al-Luma fi al-Tassawuf

Al-Hujwiri states the following:

One may speak, however, of an annihiliation that is independent of annihiliation: in that case annihilation (fana) means 'annihilation of all remembrance of other' and subsistance (baqa) means 'subsistence of the remembrance of God' (baqa al-dhikhr al-haqq)

— Al-Hujwiri, Kashf al-Mahjub

So according to these early Sufis, Fana was interpreted as a recognition of the will of God, or the abandonment of being conscious of one's self, replacing this with contemplation on God alone.

However, according to Al-Hujwiri, vision of the divine cannot occur without hard work on the part of the seeker. Such vision is combined with "ilm al-yaqin", or knowledge of certainty. This station leads to "ayn al-yaqin" (vision of certainty) and then the station of "ma'rifah" (gnosis), until one arrives at haqq al-yaqin (reality of certainty), the stage of the friends of God (Wali Allah). This stage of haqq al-yaqin is what Al-Ghazali expressed as fana' kulli and fana fi al-tawhid. For Al-Ghazali, as with Al-Junayd before him, this meant recognition of God as the sole agent of the Universe. However Fana fi al-Tawhid does not mean 'fusion', 'identification', 'incarnation' etc. Rather, for Al-Ghazali, God could not be known through speculation in the manner of the philosophers, nor through the claims of union brought by al-Bistami and al-Hallaj, rather God could be known through his self-unveiling (kashf) through the personal process of observation (mushahadah).

Al-Sarraj condemned the idea of incarnation and fusion (the unionist interpretation below):

Some mystics of Baghdad have erred in their doctrine that when they passed away from their qualities they enter into the qualities of God. This involves incarnation or leads to the Christian belief concerning Jesus. The doctrine in question has been attributed to some of the ancients, but its true meaning is that when a man goes forth from his own qualities and enters into the qualities of God, he goes forth from his own will, which is a gift to him from God, and enters into the will of God, knowing that his will is given to him by God and by virtue of this gift he is served from regarding himself and becomes entirely devoted to God and this is one of the stages of the unitarians. Those who have erred this doctrine have failed to observe that the qualities of God are not God. To make identical with his qualities is to be guilty of infidelity, because God does not descend into the soul, but that which descends into the soul is faith in God and belief in his unity (tawhid) and reverence for the thought of him.

— Al-Sarraj, Kitab al-Luma fi al-Tassawuf

This visionary interpretation has been qualified by some thinkers as a "moderate form of Islamic mysticism", whereas the next interpretation is considered an "extravagant form of mysticism".

=== Fana as union ===
Another interpretation is that of Fana as being united with the One or the Truth. The two famous exponents of this who contended that fana is total union (ittihad) were Al-Bistami and Al-Hallaj.

The interpretation of Fana ascribed to Rumi is as follows:

When the Shaykh (Halláj) said 'I am God' and carried it through (to the end), he throttled (vanquished) all the blind (sceptics). When a man's 'I' is negated (and eliminated) from existence, then what remains? Consider, O denier.

In his book, Ain-ul-Faqr, Sultan Bahoo gives his interpretation of Fana:

"Initially I was four, then became three, afterwards two and when I got out of Doi (being two), I became one with Allah."

Hossein Nasr holds that this interpretation is the highest spiritual truth.

== Fana and fanāʾ ʿan al-fanāʾ ==
Fana may be attained through constant meditation and contemplation on the attributes of God, combined with the renunciation of human attributes. Many Sufis hold that fana alone is an insufficient, or even negative, state: while ridding oneself of earthly desires is necessary for piety, it is not sufficient for the Sufi path. Through fanāʾ ʿan al-fanāʾ ("passing away from passing away"), the Sufi is said to annihilate even human attributes and lose all awareness of earthly existence. Through the grace of God, the seeker is then revived, and the secrets of the divine attributes are revealed. Only after regaining full consciousness is the more sublime state of baqāʾ (subsistence) attained, preparing the seeker for the direct vision of God.

== Similar concepts in eastern religions ==
The idea of fanāʾ in Sufism has been compared to Samadhi in Hinduism and Buddhism.

Others compared fanāʾ to the Buddhistic concept of Śūnyatā "emptiness of all things" beyond reality. In contrast, according to Sufism, the reality behind the world is not emptiness, but God. However, if fana refers to the realization of no-self, then it bears strong resemblance to Anattā, the Buddhist view of no-self. In this regard, some scholars have noted a distinction between Western and Eastern Sufism, the former focusing on love and the latter of emptiness, possibly influenced by Christian and Buddhist thoughts respectively.

== See also ==
- Baqaa
- Illuminationism
  - Ilm-e-Huzuri (Knowledge by Presence)
- Yaqeen
