= Flying Man (disambiguation) =

Flying Man may refer to:

- Flying Man an assist character in the Family Computer game Mother (video game) and in its Super Nintendo Entertainment System sequel, EarthBound.
- "The Flying Man", an 1893 short story by H. G. Wells
- "Flying man" argument, formulated by the Persian polymath and philosopher Avicenna
- Flying Man, a character in the Cirque du Soleil production Alegría
- "Flying Man", nickname of fictional character Nathan Petrelli on the television show Heroes

== See also ==
- Flying Sikh (disambiguation)
