= Mehdi Haeri Yazdi =

Iranian philosopher and Shia Islamic cleric (1923–1999)

- مهدی حائری یزدی
- Title: Ayatollah

Personal life
- Born: 1923 Qom
- Died: 8 July 1999 (aged 75–76) Tehran
- Parent: Abdul-Karim Haeri Yazdi (father)
- Education: Qom Hawza
- Relatives: Morteza Haeri Yazdi (brother)

Religious life
- Religion: Islam
- Jurisprudence: Twelver Shia Islam

Muslim leader
- Teacher: Abdul-Karim Haeri Yazdi, Ruhollah Khomeini, Hossein Borujerdi, Mirza Mahdi Ashtiani

Mehdi Haeri Yazdi (Persian: مهدی حائری یزدی; Arabic: المهدي الحائري اليزدي; al-Ḥa’irī̄ al-Yazdī̄; 1923 – 8 July 1999) was an Iranian philosopher and Shia Islamic cleric. He was the first son of Abdul Karim Haeri Yazdi, the founder of Qom Seminary and teacher of Ayatollah Ruhollah Khomeini, who became the leader of the Iranian Revolution and founder of the Islamic Republic of Iran.

== Family ==
Mahdi Ha'iri Yazdi was son of the late Ayatollah Ha'iri, a Shiite authority and disciple of Ayatollah Boroujerdi. He was a teacher of theology and Islamic philosophy.

== Academic career ==
Ha'iri received his Ph.D. in philosophy from University of Toronto. He taught Islamic philosophy at the University of Toronto and McGill University.

== Background ==
Mehdi Haeri Yazdi was "one of Khomeini's prominent pupils" but parted ways with Khomeini on several issues. He opposed Khomeini's theory of velayat-e faqih as justification for rule of the Islamic state by Islamic jurists, Khomeini's unwillingness to end the Iran–Iraq War, and believed Khomeini's fatwa against Salman Rushdie was "inconsistent with the principles of Islamic law, or Shari'a" and "against the interests of Muslim society." Haeri-Yazdi published his objection to the velayat-e faqih in his 1994 book Hekmat va Hokumat. The book was published in London, but nevertheless has been widely distributed in Iran.

In 1992 he published The Principles of Epistemology in Islamic Philosophy : Knowledge by Presence. The book aimed to present Western scholars and philosophers a theme that he considered most important : knowledge by presence - knowledge that arises from immediate and intuitive awareness.

With his knowledge of Islamic philosophy and other Islamic fields, as well as his formal training in contemporary Western philosophical traditions, Mehdi Haeri Yazdi sought to study the core concerns of modernity and Islam. Farzin Vahdat discusses Yazdi's ideas in his book Islamic Ethos and the Specter of Modernity (2015).

== Works ==
In Persian:

- Hekmat va Hokumat (London 1994)
- Kavushha-ye Aql-e Nazari
- Hiram-e Hasti
- Kavushha-ye Aql-e Amali
- safare Nafs( the journey of soul)
- Analytical philosophy
- Memoirs of Hairi-Yazdi, 2004 (Harvard Iranian Oral History) (English and Old Persian Edition)

In English:

- The Principles of Epistemology in Islamic Philosophy: Knowledge by Presence. SUNY Press 1992
- Mehdi, Ha'iri Yazdi (1982). Knowledge by presence. Cultural Studies and Research Institute. p. 344.

== See also ==
- List of ayatollahs
