= Flying Sikh =

Flying Sikh is the nickname of:

- Milkha Singh, a Sikh athlete who represented India in the 1960 and 1964 Summer Olympics
- Joginder Singh (rally driver), a successful endurance rally driver in the 1960s and 1970s
- Karamjit Singh, a Malaysian professional rally driver

== See also ==
- Flying Man (disambiguation)
