= Burushaski =

Language isolate spoken in northern Pakistan

- بُرُݸشَسکݵ; burúśaski
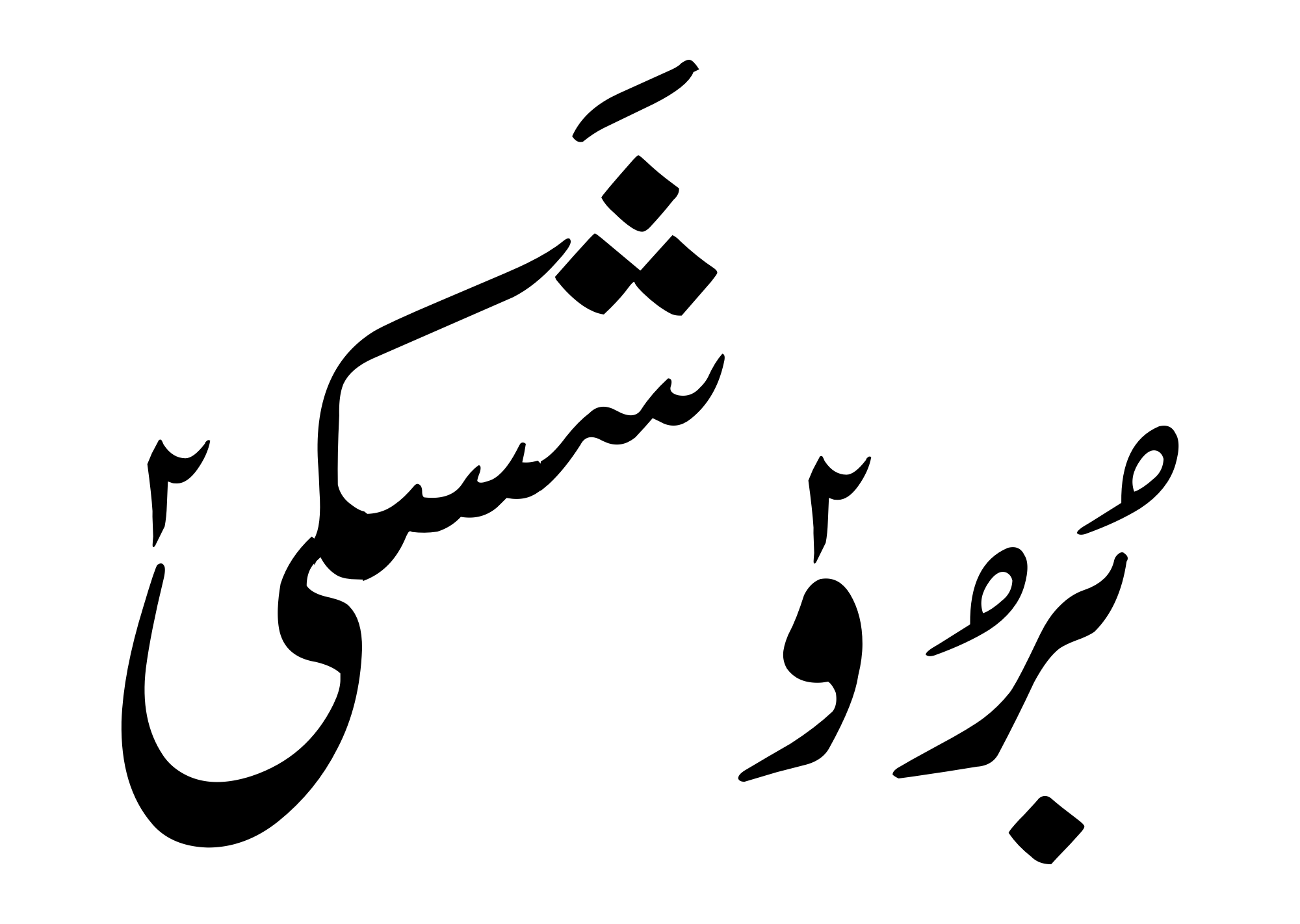
- Burushaski written in Nastaliq style.
- Pronunciation: [bʊˈruːɕʌskiː]
- Native to: Pakistan, India
- Region: Hunza, Nagar, Ghizer, Gilgit (Pakistan) and Hari Parbat, Jammu and Kashmir (India)
- Ethnicity: Burusho
- Native speakers: 130,000 (2018–2020)
- Language family: Language isolate
- Dialects: Yasin; Hunza-Nagar
- Writing system: Arabic script

Language codes
- ISO 639-3: bsk
- Glottolog: buru1296
- ELP: Burushaski
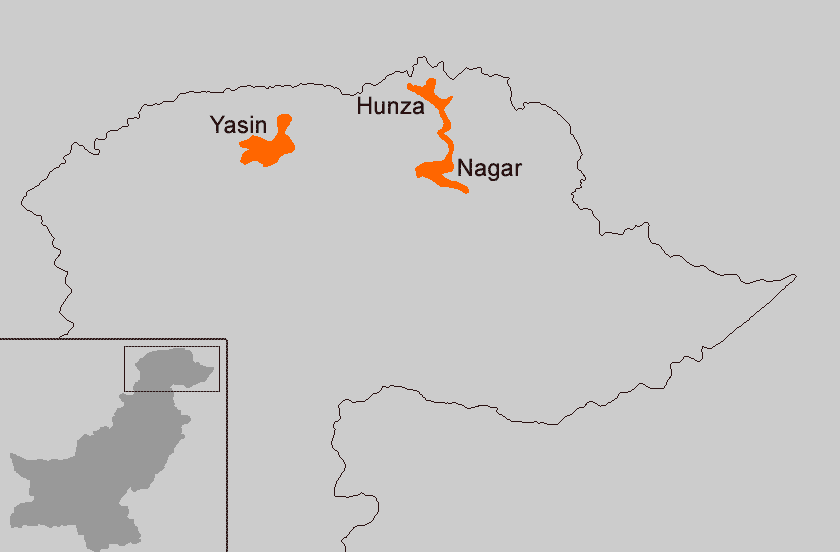

- Burushaski is classified as Vulnerable by the UNESCO Atlas of the World's Languages in Danger

Burushaski (بُرُݸشَسْکِݵ, burúśaski, Burushaski pronunciation: [bʊˈruːɕʌskiː]; autonym: [miɕáːski] 'our language') (Note: English: /ˌbʊrʊˈʃæski/) is a language isolate, spoken by the Burusho people, native to northern Gilgit-Baltistan in Pakistan. There are also a few hundred speakers of this language in Kashmir Valley, India.

In Pakistan, Burushaski is spoken by the people of the Hunza District, the Nagar District, the northern Gilgit District, the Yasin Valley in the Gupis-Yasin District, and the Ishkoman Valley of the northern Ghizer District. Their native region is in northern Gilgit–Baltistan. It also borders the Pamir corridor to the north. In India, Burushaski is spoken in Botraj Mohalla of the Hari Parbat region in Srinagar. It is generally believed that the language was spoken in a much wider area in the past, due to the two disconnected regions in which it is spoken currently, which are separated by more easily traversible regions of the Hunza Valley where the Indo-Aryan Shina language is spoken. It is also known as Werchikwar and Miśa:ski.

== Classification ==
Attempts have been made to establish links between Burushaski and several different language families, although none has been accepted by a majority of linguists.

Some hypotheses posit a genealogical relationship between Burushaski and the North Caucasian languages, Kartvelian languages, Yeniseian languages and/or Indo-European languages, usually in proposed macrofamilies:

- The proposed but contended "Dené–Caucasian" macrofamily includes Burushaski alongside Basque, North Caucasian, Yeniseian, Sino-Tibetan and Na-Dené.
- Another proposed family, known as "Karasuk", links Burushaski with Yeniseian.
- A close relationship to a Northwestern group of Indo-European languages (including Germanic and Slavic languages and e.g. the extinct Phrygian) has been proposed by Ilija Čašule.
  - Based on Čašule's investigations, Eric P. Hamp accepted a connection with Indoeuropean languages, but suggested that Burushaski is more remotely related, and rather belongs to a sister clade of the proposed "Indo-Hittite clade". (Čašule admitted that some of his proposed findings could be interpreted in this way, but stated that he preferred the Nortwestern IE alternative, based on perceived alignments in vocabulary.)
- A possible connection specifically to the North Caucasian languages.

== Language contact ==
Blench (2008) notes that the supposed evidence for external relationships of Burushaski rely on lexical data which may be better explained as originating from language contact. In particular, almost all Burushaski agricultural vocabulary appears to be borrowed from Dardic, Tibeto-Burman, and North Caucasian languages.

Following Berger (1956), the American Heritage dictionaries suggested that the word *abel 'apple', the only name for a fruit (tree) reconstructed for Proto-Indo-European, may have been borrowed from a language ancestral to Burushaski. ("Apple" and "apple tree" are báalt in modern Burushaski.)

Kashmiri linguist Sadaf Munshi stated that Burushaski may have developed alongside the Dravidian languages before the Indo-Aryan migration to South Asia, mentioning the fact that both possess retroflex sounds.

Mueezuddin Hakal (2022) argues that Burushaski preserves a primary stratum of vernacular stems alongside later loan vocabulary acquired through cultural contact, particularly with Gandhari Prakrit and Classical Sanskrit during the early centuries CE. Drawing on epigraphic and historical evidence from the Upper Indus region, he suggests that interaction between Burushaski-speaking communities and Indo Aryan linguistic traditions between the second and eighth centuries CE contributed to identifiable Sanskrit loanwords. While much core vocabulary remains vernacular in origin, certain lexical items, including terms such as tal "palate" and kapal "skull," are interpreted as reflecting Sanskrit influence.

== Varieties ==
Burushaski is spoken by about 120,000 speakers in Pakistan, and also by a few hundred in India. In Pakistan, it is spoken in three main valleys: Yasin, Hunza, and Nagar. The varieties of Hunza and Nagar diverge slightly, but are clearly dialects of a single language. The Yasin variety, also known by the Khowar exonym Werchikwar, is much more divergent. Intelligibility between Yasin and Hunza-Nagar is difficult, and Yasin is sometimes considered a distinct language and thought to be the "pure" or "original" Burushaski by the speakers of Yasin valley itself. Yasin is the least affected by contact with neighboring languages, though speakers are bilingual in Khowar. Yasin is spoken by a quarter of Burushaski speakers.

In India, Jammu & Kashmir Burushaski (JKB) "has developed divergent linguistic features which make it systematically different from the varieties spoken in Pakistan." The dialect of Burushaski spoken in India has been influenced by Kashmiri, as well as Hindi and Urdu. Unique to JKB are the features of vowel syncopation. Jammu & Kashmir Burushaski shares more similarities with the dialect spoken in Nagar than with that spoken in Hunza. The Srinagar variety of Burushaski has been described as "low toned" and as heavily influenced by other Kashmiri languages. The Srinagar variety of Burushaski has only 300 speakers.

== Phonology ==
=== Vowels ===
Burushaski primarily has five vowels, /i e a o u/. There are two sets of long vowels, distinguished by whether it is the first or the second mora that bears a stress or higher pitch. Various contractions result in long vowels; stressed vowels (marked with acute accents in Berger's transcription) tend to be longer and less "lax" (less centralised) than unstressed ones ([i e a o u] as opposed to [ɪ ɛ ʌ ɔ ʊ]). Some have described this as an intentional utterance of a rising tone or a falling tone. For example, a word óosanam اوسَنَم 'I told them' has a falling tone and the stress is on first mora. Another word, oósanam اݹسَنَم 'I did not say' has a rising tone and stress is on the second mora.

Long vowels only ever appear in stressed syllables and will thus carry one tone or the other.

As for short vowels, mid vowels and open vowels [e], [o], [a] can appear in either stressed syllables or unstressed syllables. Short close vowels [i] and [u] usually only appear in unstressed syllables. Furthermore, the pair [i] and [u] alternate with [e] and [o] respectively in a stressed syllable.

	Front	Central	Back
Close	i iː		u uː
Mid	e eː		o oː
Open		a aː	

All vowels have nasal counterparts in Hunza (in some expressive words) and in Nagar (also in proper names and a few other words).

=== Consonants ===
Berger (1998) finds the following consonants to be phonemic, shown below in the IPA and in his romanization scheme:

		Bilabial	Dental/ Alveolar	(Alveolo-) palatal	Retroflex	Velar	Uvular	Glottal
Nasal		m ⟨m⟩	n ⟨n⟩			ŋ ⟨ṅ⟩		
Plosive	aspirated	pʰ ⟨ph⟩ (Note: Pronunciation varies: [pʰ] ~ [p͡f] ~ [f].)	tʰ ⟨th⟩		ʈʰ ⟨ṭh⟩	kʰ ⟨kh⟩	qʰ ⟨qh⟩ (Note: Pronunciation varies: [qʰ] ~ [q͡χ] ~ [χ].)	
Plosive	voiceless	p ⟨p⟩	t ⟨t⟩		ʈ ⟨ṭ⟩	k ⟨k⟩	q ⟨q⟩	
Plosive	voiced	b ⟨b⟩	d ⟨d⟩		ɖ ⟨ḍ⟩	ɡ ⟨g⟩		
Affricate	aspirated (Note: The Yasin dialect lacks aspirated affricates and uses the plain ones instead.)		t͡sʰ ⟨ch⟩	t͡ɕʰ ⟨ćh⟩	ʈ͡ʂʰ ⟨c̣h⟩			
Affricate	voiceless		t͡s ⟨c⟩	t͡ɕ ⟨ć⟩	ʈ͡ʂ ⟨c̣⟩			
Affricate	voiced			d͡ʑ ⟨j⟩ (Note: Sometimes pronounced [ʑ].)	ɖ͡ʐ ⟨j̣⟩ (Note: Sometimes pronounced [ʐ].)			
Fricative	voiceless		s ⟨s⟩	ɕ ⟨ś⟩	ʂ ⟨ṣ⟩			h ⟨h⟩
Fricative	voiced		z ⟨z⟩				ʁ ⟨ġ⟩	
Trill			r ⟨r⟩					
Approximant			l ⟨l⟩	j ⟨y⟩ (Note: Berger (1998) regards [w] and [j] as allophones of /u/ and /i/ that occur in front of stressed vowels.)	ɻ ⟨ỵ⟩ (Note: This phoneme has various pronunciations, all of which are rare sounds cross-linguistically. Descriptions include: "a voiced retroflex sibilant with simultaneous dorso-palatal narrowing" (apparently [ʐʲ]) (Berger 1998); "a fricative r, pronounced with the tongue in the retroflex ('cerebral') position" (apparently [ɻ̝]/[ʐ̞], a sound which also occurs in Standard Chinese, written r in Pinyin) (Morgenstierne 1945); and "a curious sound whose phonetic realizations vary from a retroflex, spirantized glide to a retroflex velarized spirant" (Anderson forthcoming). In any case, it does not occur in the Yasin dialect, and in Hunza and Nagar it does not occur at the beginning of words.)	w ⟨w⟩		

== Writing system ==
=== Modern evolution ===
Burushaski has predominantly been a spoken language. One of the earliest examples of modern Burushaski literature was the poetry written by Prof. Allamah Nasiruddin Nasir Hunzai in the 1940s. He began by using the Urdu alphabet to write the language, but soon realized that Urdu script was not adequate to the task, since it lacked the necessary letters to represent certain phonemes unique to Burushaski. This led him to undertake the task of devising a standardised Urdu-derived alphabet geared specifically to the accurate transcription of the Burushaski language. To this end, he went on to create consonant letters ݼ [tsʰ], څ [ʈʂ], ڎ [ts], ݽ [ʂ], ڞ [ʈʂʰ], and ݣ [ŋ]. Furthermore, innovative writers of Burushaski began to use superscript Urdu numbers to indicate different stress patterns, tones and vowel-lengths. For example, in Burushaski, the letter ـو (waw) represents a long vowel with a falling tone, "óo". The letter ـݸ (waw with a superscript 2) represents a short vowel "o", and the letter ـݹ (waw with a superscript 3) represents a long vowel with a rising tone, "oó".

During the mid-twentieth century, Ghulamuddin Ghulam Hunzai, a Burushaski poet and scholar, also contributed to the development of written Burushaski using a Persian-Arabic-based orthography. He published poetry in Burushaski using a modified Arabic script adapted to represent local sounds, contributing to one of the earliest substantial bodies of written literature in the language. His works include a Burushaski translation of the Qur’an and other religious and literary writings, which expanded the written corpus of Burushaski and informed subsequent discussions on orthographic standardization. Hunzai’s contributions, alongside those of other writers, form part of the broader historical development of modern Burushaski writing conventions.

Parallel to this, a Latin-derived orthography was created by Hermann Berger - a system which has found favour among many researchers and linguists. The "Burushaski Research Academy" currently recognises both the Urdu-based and the Latin-based orthography.

In the years 2006, 2009, and 2013, a 3-volume Burushaski-Urdu Dictionary was compiled in a collaboration between the "Burushaski Research Academy" and the University of Karachi, under the auspices of Prof. Allamah Nasiruddin Nasir Hunzai and published by the university's "Bureau of Composition, Compilation & Translation". This dictionary uses primarily the Urdu-derived alphabet, while employing Berger's Latin alphabet-derived orthography in a supplementary capacity.

Recently (2022-2023), community-led efforts have sought to standardize the writing of Burushaski. Burusho Maʰraka, a cultural and linguistic organization representing Burusho communities of Hunza, Nagar, and Yasin, has promoted a standardized orthography based on the Persian-Arabic script. The organization has worked to harmonize spelling conventions and produce teaching and reference materials aimed at strengthening literacy and inter-regional consistency in written Burushaski. These initiatives build upon earlier scholarly work and aim to provide a unified writing system for educational and digital use.

=== History ===
Tibetan sources record a Bru zha language of the Gilgit valley, which appears to have been Burushaski and the script of which was one of five used also to write the extinct Zhangzhung language. Although Burushaski may once have been a significant literary language, no Bru zha manuscripts are known to have survived. There is a very voluminous Buddhist tantra of the 'Ancient' (rNying ma) school of Tibetan Buddhism, preserved in Tibetan as the mDo dgongs 'dus, which has been the subject of numerous Tibetological publications, including a recent monograph by Jacob P. Dalton, The Gathering of Intentions, which is supposed to be translated from the Burushaski (bru zha'i skad). It contains words that are not Sanskrit but which have not, thus far, been demonstrated satisfactorily to be relatable either to Burushaski, or to any other language. If at least part of this text had actually been translated from Burushaski, it would make it one of the major monuments of an apparently lost literature.

=== Alphabet ===
The table below presents the orthography developed by Allamah Nasiruddin Nasir Hunzai and used in the Burushaski-Urdu Dictionary published by the University of Karachi.

In addition, linguists working on Burushaski use various makeshift transcriptions based on the Latin alphabet, most commonly that by Berger(see below). Parallel to these Latin-based systems, several others, including those of Ghulamuddin Hunzai and the Burusho Maʰraka, have used modified Persian-Arabic orthographies.

==== Alphabets proposed by Allamah Nasiruddin Nasir Hunzai ====
Transliteration	IPA	Forms				Unicode	Notes
Transliteration	IPA	Isolated	Final	Medial	Initial	Unicode	Notes
/ A a / U u / I i	[∅] ([a][u][i])	ا	-	-	ا	U+0627	Letter alif at the beginning of a word can serve two functions. First, it precedes vowel letters (اݸ) [o], (او / اُو) [óo][úu], (اݹ / اُݹ) [oó][uú], (اِیـ / اِی) [íi], (اِݶـ / اِݶ) [ií], (اݵـ / اݺ) [e], (ایـ / اے) [ée], or (اݶـ / اݻ) [eé]. Second, it acts as a vowel carrier for diacritics of three short vowels of Burushaski, اَ [a], (اُ) [u], and (اِ) [i].
Áa áa	[aː˥˩]	آ / ا	ـا	-	آ	U+0622; U+0627	Vowel phoneme [aː˥˩] (long vowel [a] with a falling tone) is represented with (آ) when at the beginning of a word, and with (ـا / ا) when in the middle or end of a word.
a	[a]	ݳ	ـݳ	-	-	U+0773	Only occurs at the end of the word. Elsewhere, the short vowel [a] is represented with a zabar/fatha diacritic (اَ / ◌َ / ـَ). Alternatively, a final he letter (ه / ـہ) can also be used for a word-final short vowel [a]
Aá aá	[aː˨˦]	ݴ	ـݴ	-	ݴ	U+0774	Vowel phoneme [aː˨˦] represents a long vowel [a] with a rising tone.
B b	[b]	ب	ـب	ـبـ	بـ	U+0628	
P p	[p]	پ	ـپ	ـپـ	پـ	U+067e	
T t	[t̪]	ت	ـت	ـتـ	تـ	U+062a	
Ṭ ṭ	[ʈ]	ٹ	ـٹ	ـٹـ	ٹـ	U+0679	
S s	[s]	ث	ـث	ـثـ	ثـ	U+062b	Only used in loanwords of Arabic origin.
J j	[d͡ʑ ~ ʑ]	ج	ـج	ـجـ	جـ	U+062c	
Ć ć	[t͡ɕ]	چ	ـچ	ـچـ	چـ	U+0686	
H h	[h]	ح	ـح	ـحـ	حـ	U+062d	Only used in loanwords of Arabic origin.
Ċh ċh	[t͡sʰ]	ݼ	ـݼ	ـݼـ	ݼـ	U+077C	Unique letter in Burushaski, not in Urdu alphabet. In Burushaski orthography, it is more common to write a small Urdu number 4 ie ۴, in place of 4 dots. However, the letter ڇـ ـڇـ ـڇ ڇ is also an acceptable alternative.
Qh qh	[qʰ~qχ~χ]	خ	ـخ	ـخـ	خـ	U+062e	
C̣ c̣	[ʈ͡ʂ]	څ	ـڅ	ـڅـ	څـ	U+0685	Unique letter in Burushaski, not in Urdu alphabet.
D d	[d]	د	ـد	-		U+062f	
Ḍ ḍ	[ɖ]	ڈ	ـڈ	-		U+0688	
Z z	[z]	ذ	ـذ	-		U+0630	Only used in loanwords of Arabic origin.
Ċ ċ	[t͡s]	ڎ	ـڎ	-		U+068E	Unique letter in Burushaski, not in Urdu alphabet.
R r	[r]	ر	ـر	-		U+0631	
Ṛ ṛ	[ɽ]	ڑ	ـڑ	-		U+0691	No word begins with this letter.
Z z	[z]	ز	ـز	-		U+0632	
Ż ż	[d̠͡ʐ~ʐ]	ژ	ـژ	-		U+0698	
S s	[s]	س	ـس	ـسـ	سـ	U+0633	
Ś ś	[ɕ]	ش	ـش	ـشـ	شـ	U+0634	
Ṣ ṣ	[ʂ]	ݽ	ـݽ	ـݽـ	ݽـ	U+077D	Unique letter in Burushaski, not in Urdu alphabet. In Burushaski orthography, it is more common to write a small Urdu number 4 ie ۴, in place of 4 dots. However, the letter ݜـ ـݜـ ـݜ ݜ is also an acceptable alternative.
S s	[s]	ص	ـص	ـصـ	صـ	U+0635	Only used in loanwords of Arabic origin.
Z z	[z]	ض	ـض	ـضـ	ضـ	U+0636	Only used in loanwords of Arabic origin.
C̣h c̣h	[ʈ͡ʂʰ]	ڞ	ـڞ	ـڞـ	ڞـ	U+069E	Unique letter in Burushaski, not in Urdu alphabet.
T t	[t]	ط	ـط	ـطـ	طـ	U+0637U	Only used in loanwords of Arabic origin.
Z z	[z]	ظ	ـظ	ـظـ	ظـ	U+0638	Only used in loanwords of Arabic origin.
-	[∅]/[ʔ]	ع	ـع	ـعـ	عـ	U+0639	Only used in loanwords of Arabic origin.
Ġ ġ	[ɣ~ʁ]	غ	ـغ	ـغـ	غـ	U+063a	
F f	[pʰ~pf~f]	ف	ـف	ـفـ	فـ	U+0641	Only used in loanwords of foreign origin.
Q q	[q]	ق	ـق	ـقـ	قـ	U+0642	
K k	[k]	ک	ـک	ـکـ	کـ	U+06a9	
Ṅ ṅ	[ŋ]	ݣ	ـݣ	ـݣـ	ݣـ	U+0763	Unique letter in Burushaski, not in Urdu alphabet. No word begins with this letter.
G g	[ɡ]	گ	ـگ	ـگـ	گـ	U+06af	
L l	[l]	ل	ـل	ـلـ	لـ	U+0644	
M m	[m]	م	ـم	ـمـ	مـ	U+0645	
N n	[n]	ن	ـن	ـنـ	نـ	U+0646	
Ṇ ṇ	[◌̃]	ں	ـں	ـنـ	نـ	U+06BA	No word begins with this letter.
W w / Óo óo / Úu úu	[w][oː˥˩][uː˥˩]	و	ـو	-	او / و	U+0648	This letter represents three phonemes based on context, consonant [w], or long vowels with falling tone, [oː˥˩], and [uː˥˩]. In order for this letter to represent vowel [u] and not [o], the letter before will have to carry a pesh/damma diacritic (◌ؙو / ـُو). If used at the beginning of a word, if representing consonant [w], it will be written standalone (و), if representing a vowel [oː˥˩] or [uː˥˩], it will be preceded by alif (او / اُو). For [u], alef will carry the pesh/damma diacritic.
O o / u	[o][u]	ݸ	ـݸ	-	اݸ	U+0778	This letter represents short vowel [o]. When a word begins with this vowel phoneme, the letter needs to be preceded by alif اݸ. In a final position, this letter also represents short vowel [u], with the preceding letter carrying a pesh/damma diacritic (◌ؙݸ / ـُݸ).
Oó oó / Uú uú	[oː˨˦][uː˨˦]	ݹ	ـݹ	-	اݹ	U+0779	This letter represents vowel phonemes [oː˨˦] and [uː˨˦], long vowels [o] and [u] with a rising tone. When representing [u], the preceding letter will have to carry a pesh/damma diacritic (◌ؙݹ / ـُݹ). When a word begins with this vowel phoneme, the letter needs to be preceded by alif (اݸ / اُݸ). For [u], alef will carry the pesh/damma diacritic.
H h	[h]	ہ	ـہ	ـہـ	ہـ	U+06C1	At the end of the word, depending on context, this letter can represent the consonant [h] or the short vowel [a]. For a word-final vowel, an alef with superscript "2" (ݳ / ـݳ) can also be used.
H h	[◌ʰ]/[◌ʱ]	ھ	ـھ	ـھـ	ھـ	U+06BE	No word begins with this letter. Not a standalone letter, its only function is to be part of digraphs representing aspirated consonants.
Ỵ ỵ	[ɻ]	ݷ	ـݷ	ـݷـ	ݷـ	U+0777	Unique letter in Burushaski, not in Urdu alphabet. No word begins with this letter. In Burushaski orthography, it is more common to write a small Urdu number 4 ie ۴, in place of 4 dots. However, a letter ye with 4 dots below is also an acceptable alternative.
Y y	[ʔ]	ئ	ـئ	ـئـ	ئـ	U+0626	No word begins with this letter.
Y y / Ée ée / Íi íi	[j][eː˥˩][iː˥˩]	ی	ـی	ـیـ	ایـ / یـ	U+06CC	This letter represents three phonemes based on context, consonant [j], or long vowels with falling tone, [eː˥˩], and [iː˥˩]. In order for this letter to represent vowel [i] and not [e], the letter before will have to carry a zer/kasra diacritic (◌ِیـ / ـِیـ). If used at the beginning of a word, if representing consonant [j], it will be written standalone (یـ), if representing a vowel [eː˥˩] or [iː˥˩], it will be preceded by alif (ایـ / اِیـ). For [i], alef will carry the zer/kasra diacritic. In final position, this letter does not represent the vowel [e]. Instead, the letter big ye (ے) is used.
E e / i	[e][i]	ݵ	-	ـݵـ	اݵـ	U+0775	This letter represents short vowel [e]. When a word begins with this vowel phoneme, the letter needs to be preceded by alif اݵـ. In a final position, this letter represents short vowel [i]. For writing short vowel [e] in final position, the letter big ye with a superscript "2" (ݺ) is used.
Eé eé / Ií ií	[eː˨˦][iː˨˦]	ݶ	ـݶ	ـݶـ	اݶـ	U+0779	This letter represents vowel phonemes [eː˨˦] and [iː˨˦], long vowels [e] and [i] with a rising tone. When representing [i], the preceding letter will have to carry a zer/kasra diacritic (◌ِݶـ / ـِݶـ). When a word begins with this vowel phoneme, the letter needs to be preceded by alif اݶـ / اِݶـ. For [i], alef will carry the zer/kasra diacritic. In final position, this letter does not represent the vowel [e]. Instead, the letter big ye with a superscript "3"' (ݻ) is used.
ée	[eː˥˩]	ے	ـے	-		U+06D2	This letter is only used at the end of a word and it represents long vowel with falling tone [eː˥˩].
e	[e]	ݺ	ـݺ	-		U+077A	This letter is only used at the end of a word and it represents short vowel [e].
eé	[eː˨˦]	ݻ	ـݻ	-		U+077B	This letter is only used at the end of a word and it represents long vowel with rising tone [eː˨˦].

==== Aspirates ====
Below table shows the digraphs, a combination of a consonant with the letter round he (ھ) that represent aspirated consonants that occur in Burushaski.

Digraph	Transcription	IPA
پھ	ph	[pʰ]
تھ	th	[tʰ]
ٹھ	ṭh	[ʈʰ]
چھ	ćh	[t͡ɕʰ]
کھ	kh	[kʰ]

==== Vowels ====
Below tables show how vowels are written in different parts of the word.

Short Vowel
A	O	U	E	I
Vowel at the beginning of a word
اَ	اݸ	اُ	اݵـ	اِ
Vowel at the middle of a word
◌َ	ݸ / ـݸ	◌ُ	ݵـ / ـݵـ	◌ِ
Vowel at the end of a word
ݳ / ـݳ ہ / ـہ	ݸ / ـݸ	◌ُ / ◌ُݸ / ـُݸ	ݺ / ـݺ	ݵ / ـݵ

Long vowel, falling tone /˥˩/
Áa	Óo	Úu	Ée	Íi
Vowel at the beginning of a word
آ	او	اُو	ایـ	اِیـ
Vowel at the middle of a word
ا / ـا	و / ـو	◌ُو / ـُو	یـ / ـیـ	◌ِیـ / ـِیـ
Vowel at the end of a word
ا / ـا	و / ـو	◌ُو / ـُو	ے / ـے	ی / ـی

Long vowel, rising tone /˨˦/
Aá	Oó	Uú	Eé	Ií
Vowel at the beginning of a word
ݴ	اݹ	اُݹ	اݶـ	اِݶـ
Vowel at the middle of a word
ݴ / ـݴ	ݹ / ـݹ	◌ُݹ / ـُݹ	ݶـ / ـݶـ	◌ِݶـ / ـِݶـ
Vowel at the end of a word
ݴ / ـݴ	ݹ / ـݹ	◌ُݹ / ـُݹ	ݻ / ـݻ	ݶ / ـݶ

=== Sample text ===
Below poetry, written in praise of University of Karachi for its role in documentation and preservation of Burushaski language and literature, is presented as a sample text in Burushaski Arabic alphabet, alongside Urdu and English translation of each verse.

Burushaski
Urdu Translation
English Translation

ذاتِ خدا یَکُ ڎُم کھݸت بݺ اکھݵݽ رَحمتَن
جامعهٔ کراچی میر اݹدِکِھرَس نِعمَتَن

ذات خدا کی طرف سے ہم پر یہ ایسی عجیب رحمت ہوئی کہ جامعہ کراچی کی نزدیکی اور ادبی سر پرستی کی لازوال نعمت ہمیں نصیب ہوئی.
It has been such an incredible blessing from God that we have been granted with the eternal gift of proximity and literary patronage of University of Karachi.

جامعهٔ کراچی میر تازہ جَہانَن بِلݳ
چشمِ بصیرت پُھٹ اݺ عَقَلݺ نِشانَن بِلݳ

جامعہ کراچی ہمارے لئے ایک جدید کا ئنات ہے۔ ساتھیو! چشم دل سے دیکھو اس امر میں اللہ کا ایک معجزہ ہے۔
University of Karachi is a modern institution for us. Colleagues! Look with your eyes and heart, there is a miracle of Allah in this matter.

رَبِّ تَعالیٰ کرم! علم و ادب بُٹ اُیَم!
اَلتݸ جَہانِݣ ݽِقَم! شُکرݸ مَنِݽ یا خدا!

اللہ تعالی کے فضل و کرم سے علم وادب بے حد شیریں ہیں، ان سے فیضیاب ہونے والوں کی دنیا و آخرت آباد ہو جاتی ہیں، یا اللہ ہمیں توفیق عطا فرما تا کہ ہم تیرا شکر کریں۔
Knowledge and literature are a limitlessly sweet by the grace and mercy of Allah almighty. Bountiful in this world and the next are those who are blessed by them. Oh Allah, grant us the ability to thank You.

علم و ادبݺ صاحِبان، فضل و ہُنرݺ کامِلان!
اُیون کݺ اُیون دوستان! شُکرݸ مَنِݽ یا خدا!

اس وسیلے سے علم وادب اور فضل و کامل والے تمام حضرات کی دوستی کی سعادت ہم کو نصیب ہوئی، خدایا اس نعمت پر ہم تیرا شکر کرتے ہیں۔
By means of this [university], we have been blessed with the friendship of all those who possess knowledge, literature, grace and perfection. God, we thank you for this blessing.

جامِعَه کُڎ نامدار، اسپِ قلَمݺ شَہسَوار
علم و ادبݺ تاجدار شُکرݸ مَنِݽ یا خدا!

جامعہ والے تمام صاحبان نامور و نامدار ہیں، وہ رخش قلم کے میدان کے شہسوار ہیں۔ اور علم و ادب کے تاجدار بادشاہ ہیں۔ خدایا ہم تیرا شکر ادا کرتے ہیں۔
All the scholars of the University are famous and renowned, they are the knights of the field of pen. And the crowned kings of knowledge and literature. God we thank you.

جامِعَه آبِ حیات مَعَلِّمِین اُبون باغبان
شگِرِشݸ ڞا ݽِقَم بَسݵݣ شُکرݸ مَنِݽ یا خدا!

جامعہ گویا سرچشمۂ آب حیات ہے، شاگرد سب اس معنی میں سدا بہار باغات ہیں کہ اساتذۂ کرام اُن کی آبیاری کرتے رہتے ہیں۔ خدایا ہم تیرا شکر ادا کرتے ہیں۔
The university is like the fountain of life, the students are all evergreen gardens in the sense that teachers keep irrigating them. God we thank you.

تازہ گلابݺ نَس اُیَم، دوستیݺ تھݸمَلݺ تَھس اُیَم
قَلَم گیݸ شان کݺ ہَس اُیَم شُکرݸ مَنِݽ یا خدا!

جب گلاب نو شگفتہ ہو، تو اسکی خوشبو مثالی ہوتی ہے، جہاں دوستی کی دھنی اور اپنے ماضی کی دھنی بناتے ہیں تو اس کا دھواں بھی شیریں ہوتا ہے، اھل قلم کی شان و مرتبت لذیذ ہوتی ہے، یا اللہ تیرا شکر ہے۔
Just as a newly blooming rose, whose fragrance is ideal, where friendships and memories are made, then its scent is also sweet, the glory of the pen is delicious, O Allah, thanks be to you.

یَرمݸ ہݸئیلتَرڎ نصیر! جامِعه گمَنا بݵیَم؟
تِک نُمݳ سݵن تِل اَکول شُکرݸ مَنِݽ یا خدا!

زمانہ قدیم کا چوپان نصیر! میں کیا جانوں کہ تو جامعہ ہو گیا ہے۔ خاک بن کرکہا کر «یا خدا تیرا شکر ہے»۔
Nasir, the shepherd of the old times! How should I know that you have completed university? By turning into dust and saying, "O God, thank you."

== Grammar ==
Burushaski is a double-marking language and word order is generally subject–object–verb.

Nouns in Burushaski are divided into four genders: human masculine, human feminine, countable objects, and uncountable ones (similar to mass nouns). The assignment of a noun to a particular gender is largely predictable. Some words can belong both to the countable and to the uncountable class, producing differences in meaning. For example, when countable, báalt means 'apple' but when uncountable, it means 'apple tree' (Grune 1998).

Noun morphology consists of the noun stem, a possessive prefix (mandatory for some nouns, and thus an example of inherent possession), and number and case suffixes. Distinctions in number are singular, plural, indefinite, and grouped. Cases include absolutive, ergative/oblique, genitive, and several locatives; the latter indicate both location and direction and may be compounded.

Burushaski verbs have three basic stems: past tense, present tense, and consecutive. The past stem is the citation form and is also used for imperatives and nominalization; the consecutive stem is similar to a past participle and is used for coordination. Agreement on the verb has both nominative and ergative features: transitive verbs and unaccusatives mark both the subject and the object of a clause, while unergatives verbs mark only subject agreement on the verb. Altogether, a verb can take up to four prefixes and six suffixes.

=== Nouns ===
==== Noun classes ====
In Burushaski, there are four noun classes, similar to declensional classes in Indo-European languages, but unlike Indo-European, the nominal classes in Burushaski are associated with four grammatical "genders":

- m = male human beings, gods and spirits
- f = female human beings and spirits
- x = animals, countable nouns
- y = abstract concepts, fluids, uncountable nouns

Below, the abbreviation "h" will stand for the combination of the m- and f-classes, while "hx" will stand for the combination of the m-, f- and x-classes. Nouns in the x-class typically refer to countable, non-human beings or things, for example animals, fruit, stones, eggs, or coins; conversely, nouns in the y-class are as a rule uncountable abstractions or mass nouns, such as rice, fire, water, snow, wool, etc.

However, these rules are not universal – countable objects in the y-class are sometimes encountered, e.g. ha, 'house'. Related words can subtly change their meanings when used in different classes – for example, bayú, when a member of the x-class, means salt in clumps, but when in the y-class, it means powdered salt. Fruit trees are understood collectively and placed in the y-class, but their individual fruits belong to the x-class. Objects made of particular materials can belong to either the x- or the y- class: stone and wood are in the x-class, but metal and leather in the y-class. The article, adjectives, numerals and other attributes must be in agreement with the noun class of their subject.

==== Pluralisation ====
There are two numbers in Burushaski: singular and plural. The singular is unmarked, while the plural is expressed by means of suffix, which vary depending on the class of the noun:

- h-class: possible suffixes -ting, -aro, -daro, -taro, -tsaro
- h- and x-class: possible suffixes -o, -išo, -ko, -iko, -juko; -ono, -u; -i, -ai; -ts, -uts, -muts, -umuts; -nts, -ants, -ints, -iants, -ingants, -ents, -onts
- y-class: possible suffixes -ng, -ang, -ing, -iang; -eng, -ong, -ongo; -ming, -čing, -ičing, -mičing, -ičang (Nagar dialect)

Some nouns admit two or three different suffixes, while others have no distinctive suffix, and occur only in the plural, e.g. bras 'rice', gur 'wheat', bishké, 'fur', (cf. plurale tantum). On the other hand, there are also nouns which have identical forms in the singular and plural, e.g. hagúr 'horses'. Adjectives have a unique plural suffix, whose form depends on the class of the noun they modify, e.g. burúm 'white' gives the x-class plural burum-išo and the y-class plural burúm-ing.

Examples of pluralisation in Burushaski:

- wazíir (m), pl. wazíirishu 'vizier, minister'
- hir (m), pl. hiri 'man' (stress shifts)
- gus (f), pl. gushínga 'woman' (stress shifts)
- dasín (f), pl. daseyoo 'girl', 'unmarried woman'
- huk (x), pl. huká 'dog'
- thely (x), pl. tilí 'walnut'
- thely (y), pl. theleng 'walnut tree'

==== Declension ====
Burushaski is an ergative language. It has five primary cases.

Case	Ending	Function
Absolutive	unmarked	The subject of intransitive verbs and the object of transitive ones.
Ergative	-e	The subject of transitive verbs.
Oblique	-e; -mo (f)	Genitive; the basis of secondary case endings
Dative	-ar, -r	Dative, allative.
Ablative	-um, -m, -mo	Indicates separation (e.g. 'from where?')

The case suffixes are appended to the plural suffix, e.g. Huséiniukutse, 'the people of Hussein' (ergative plural). The genitive ending is irregular, /mo/, for singular f-class nouns, but /-e/ in all others (identical to the ergative ending). The dative ending, /-ar/, /-r/ is attached to the genitive ending for singular f-class nouns, but to the stem for all others. Examples:

- hir-e 'the man's', gus-mo 'the woman's' (gen.)
- hir-ar 'to the man', gus-mu-r 'to the woman' (dat.)

The genitive is placed before the thing possessed: Hunzue tham, 'the Emir of Hunza.'

The endings of the secondary cases are formed from a secondary case suffix (or infix) and one of the primary endings /-e/, /-ar/ or /-um/. These endings are used directionally: the oblique /-e/ is for where something is or happens, ('locative'), the dative /-ar/ is for where something is going towards ('allative'), and the ablative /-um/ is for where something is going away from. The infixes, and their basic meanings, are as follows:

1. -ts- 'at'
2. -ul- 'in'
3. -aṭ- 'on; with'
4. -al- 'near' (only in the Hunza dialect)

From these, the following secondary or compound cases are formed:

Infix	Oblique	Dative	Ablative
-ts-	-ts-e 'at'	-ts-ar 'to'	-ts-um 'from'
-ul-	-ul-e 'in'	-ul-ar 'into'	-ul-um 'out of'
-aṭ-	-aṭ-e 'on','with'	-aṭ-ar 'up to'	-aṭ-um 'down from'
-al-	-al-e 'near'	-al-ar 'to'	-al-um 'from'

The regular endings /-ul-e/ and /-ul-ar/ are archaic and are now replaced by /-ul-o/ and /-ar-ulo/ respectively.

==== Pronouns and pronominal prefixes ====
Nouns indicating parts of the body and kinship terms are accompanied by an obligatory pronominal prefix. Thus, one cannot simply say 'mother' or 'arm' in Burushaski, but only 'my arm', 'your mother', 'his father', etc. For example, the root mi 'mother', is never found in isolation, instead one finds:

- i-mi 'his mother', mu-mi 'her mother', "gu-mi" 'your mother'(3f sg.), u-mi 'their mother' (3h pl.), u-mi-tsaro 'their mothers'(3h pl.).

The pronominal, or personal, prefixes agree with the person, number and – in the third person, the class of their noun. A summary of the basic forms is given in the following table:

		Singular	Plural
1st person		a-	mi-, me-
2nd person		gu-, go-	ma-
3rd person	m	i-, e-	u-, o-
3rd person	f	mu-	u-, o-
3rd person	x	i-, y-	u-, o-
3rd person	y	i-, e-	

Personal pronouns in Burushaski distinguish proximal and distal forms, e.g. khin 'he, this one here', but in, 'he, that one there'. In the oblique, there are additional abbreviated forms.

=== Numerals ===
The Burushaski number system is vigesimal, i.e. based on the number 20. For example, 20 altar, 40 alto-altar (2 times 20), 60 iski-altar (3 times 20) etc. The base numerals are:

- 1 han (or hen, hak)
- 2 altó (or altán)
- 3 isko (or iskey)
- 4 wálto
- 5 čindó
- 6 mishíndo
- 7 thaló
- 8 altámbo
- 9 hunchó
- 10 tóorumo (also toorimi and turma)
- 100 tha

Examples of compound numerals:

11 turma-han, 12 turma-alto, 13 turma-isko, ... , 19 turma-hunti; 20 altar, 30 altar-toorumo, 40 alto-altar, 50 alto-altar-toorumo, 60 iski-altar and so on; 21 altar-hak, 22 altar-alto, 23 altar-isko and so on.

=== Verbs ===
==== Overview ====
The verbal morphology of Burushaski is extremely complicated and rich in forms. Many sound changes can take place, including assimilation, deletion and accent shift, which are unique for almost every verb. Here, we can specify only certain basic principles.

The Burushaski finite verb falls into the following categories:

Category	Possible forms
Tense/Aspect	Present, Future, Imperfect, Perfect, Pluperfect
Mood	Conditional, three Optatives, Imperative, Conative
Number	Singular, Plural
Person	1st, 2nd and 3rd Person (2nd person only in the imperative).
Noun class	the four noun classes m, f, x and y (only in the 3rd person)

For many transitive verbs, in addition to the subject, the (direct) object is also indicated, also by pronominal prefixes which vary according to person, number and class. All verbs have negative forms, and many intransitive verbs also have derived transitive forms. The infinitive forms – which in Burushaski are the absolutives of the past and present, the perfect participle, and two infinitives – admit all the finite variations except tense and mood. Infinitive forms are made together with auxiliary verbs and periphrastic forms.

==== The 11 positions of the finite verb ====
All verb forms can be constructed according to a complex but regular position system. Berger describes a total of 11 possible positions, or slots, although not all of these will be filled in any given verb form. Many positions also have several alternative contents (indicated by A/B/C below). The verb stem is in position 5, preceded by four possible prefixes and followed by six possible suffixes. The following table gives an overview of the positions and their functions

The positions of Burushaski finite verbs
Position	Affixes and their meanings
1	Negative prefix a-
2a/b	d-prefix (creates intransitive verbs) / n-prefix (absolutive prefix)
3	Pronominal prefixes: subject of intransitive, object of transitive verbs
4	s-prefix (creates secondary transitive verbs)
5	Verb Stem
6	Plural suffix -ya- on the verb stem
7	Present stem mark -č- (or š, ts..) forming the present, future and imperfect
8a/b	Pronominal suffix of the 1.sg. -a- (subject) / linking vowel (no semantic meaning)
9a	m-suffix: forms the m-participle and m-optative from the simple /
9b	m-suffix: forms the future and conditional from the present stem /
9c	n-suffix: marks the absolutive (see position 2) /
9d	š-suffix: forms the š-optative and the -iš-Infinitive /
9e	Infinitive ending -as, -áas / optative suffix -áa (added directly to the stem)
10a	Pronominal suffixes of the 2nd and 3rd Person and 1. pl. (subject) /
10b	Imperative forms (added directly to the stem) /
10c	Forms of the auxiliary verb ba- for forming the present, imperfect, perfect and pluperfect
11	Nominal endings and particles

==== Formation of tenses and moods ====
The formation of the tenses and moods involves the use of several positions, or slots, in complicated ways. The preterite, perfect, pluperfect and conative are formed from the 'simple stem,' whereas the present, imperfect, future and conditional are formed from the 'present stem,' which is itself formed from the simple stem by placing -č- in position 7. The optative and imperative are derived directly from the stem. Altogether, the schema is as follows:

The formation of the tenses and moods of the verb her 'to cry', without prefixes:

Simple stem tenses
Grammatical category	Construction	Form and meaning
Conative	stem + personal suffix	her-i 'he starts to cry'
Preterite	stem [+ linking vowel] + m-suffix + personal suffix	her-i-m-i 'he cried'
Perfect	stem [+ linking vowel] + present auxiliary	her-a-i 'he has cried'
Pluperfect	stem [+ linking vowel] + perfect auxiliary	her-a-m 'he had cried'

Present stem tenses
Grammatical category	Construction	Form and meaning
Future	stem + present marker [+ linking vowel + m-suffix] + personal ending	her-č-i 'he will cry'
Present	stem + present marker + linking vowel + present auxiliary	her-č-a-i 'he is crying'
Imperfect	stem + present marker + linking vowel + perfect auxiliary	her-č-a-m 'he was crying, used to cry'
Conditional	stem + present marker + linking vowel + m-Suffix (except 1. pl.) + če	her-č-u-m-če '... he would cry',
Conditional	stem + present marker + linking vowel + 1. pl. ending + če	her-č-an-če 'we would cry'

Optatives and Imperative
Grammatical category	Construction	Form and meaning
áa-optative	stem + áa (in all persons)	her-áa "... should... cry"
m-optative	stem [+ linking vowel] + m-suffix	her-u-m "... should... cry"
š-optative	stem + (i)š + personal suffix	her-š-an "he should cry"
Imperative singular	stem [+ é for ending-accented verbs]	her "cry!"
Imperative plural	stem + in	her-in "cry!"

==== Indication of the subject and object ====
The subject and object of the verb are indicated by the use of personal prefixes and suffixes in positions 3, 8 and 10 as follows:

Affix	Position	Function
Prefixes	3	direct object of transitive verbs, subject of intransitive ones
Suffixes	8/10	subject of transitive and intransitive verbs

The personal prefixes are identical to the pronominal prefixes of nouns (mandatory with body parts and kinship terms, as above). A simplified overview of the forms of the affixes is given in the following table:

Personal prefix (Position 3)
Person/ noun class	Singular	Plural
1st Person	a-	mi-
2nd Person	gu-	ma-
3rd Person m	i-	u-
3rd Person f	mu-	u-
3rd Person x	i-	u-
3rd Person y	i-	

Personal suffixes (Positions 8 and 10)
Person/ noun class	Singular	Plural
1st/2nd Person	-a	-an
3rd Person m	-i	-an
3rd Person f	-o	-an
3rd Person x	-i	-ie
3rd Person y	-i	

For example, the construction of the preterite of the transitive verb phus 'to tie', with prefixes and suffixes separated by hyphens, is as follows:

- i-phus-i-m-i "he ties him" (filled positions: 3-5-8-9-10)
- mu-phus-i-m-i "he ties her (f)"
- u-phus-i-m-i "he ties them (pl. hx)"
- mi-phus-i-m-i "he ties us"
- i-phus-i-m-an "we/you/they tie him"
- mi-phus-i-m-an "you/they tie us"
- i-phus-i-m-a "I tie it"
- gu-phus-i-m-a "I tie you"

The personal affixes are also used when the noun occupies the role of the subject or the object, e.g. hir i-ír-i-mi 'the man died'. With intransitive verbs, the subject function is indicated by both a prefix and a suffix, as in:

- gu-ir-č-u-m-a "you will die" (future)
- i-ghurts-i-m-i "he sank" (preterite)

Personal prefixes do not occur in all verbs and all tenses. Some verbs do not admit personal prefixes, others still do so only under certain circumstances. Personal prefixes used with intransitive verbs often express a volitional function, with prefixed forms indicating an action contrary to the intention of the subject. For example:

- hurúṭ-i-m-i "he sat down" (volitional action without prefix)
- i-ír-i-m-i "he died" (involuntary action with prefix)
- ghurts-i-mi "he went willingly underwater", "he dove" (without prefix)
- i-ghurts-i-m-i "he went unwillingly underwater", "he sank" (with prefix)

==== The d- prefix ====
A number of verbs – mostly according to their root form – are found with the d-prefix in position 2, which occurs before a consonant according to vowel harmony. The precise semantic function of the d-prefix is unclear. With primary transitive verbs the d-prefix, always without personal prefixes, forms regular intransitives. Examples:

- i-phalt-i-mi 'he breaks it open' (transitive)
- du-phalt-as 'to break open, to explode' (intransitive)

A master's thesis research work of a native speaker of Burushaski on Middle Voice Construction in the Hunza Dialect claims that the [dd-] verbal prefix is an overt morphological middle marker for MV constructions, while the [n-] verbal prefix is a morphological marker for passive voice. The data primarily come from the Hunza dialect of Burushaski, but analogous phenomena can be observed in other dialects. This research is based on a corpus of 120 dd-prefix verbs. This research has showed that position {-2} on the verb template is occupied by voice-marker in Burushaski. The author argues that the middle marker is a semantic category of its own and that it is clearly distinguished from the reflexive marker in this language. The middle marker (MM) means the grammatical device used to "indicate that the two semantic roles of Initiator and Endpoint refer to a single holistic entity" (Kemmer 1993: 47). In the view of that definition, I look at a middle marked verb in Burushaski and illustration follows the example.

- hiles dd-i-il-imi 'the boy drenched'

==== Auxiliary verb constructions ====
Alternatively, the d- prefix might have historically derived from an original auxiliary element meaning 'to come', which may explain the doubled subject inflectional pattern in what appear to be partially lexicalized reflexes of earlier univerbated deictic AVCs.

a-t-i-man-im-i
NEG-AUX-3SG-become-PST-3SG
'He wasn't born.'

In fact, the root du is still found in certain doubled inflection AVCs in which it serves as the lexical head meaning 'come', not as the auxiliary:

óo-du-móo b-o-m
NEG-come-3SG.FEM AUX-3SG-AP
'She didn't come.'

== See also ==
- Burushaski Swadesh list
- Burushaski comparative vocabulary list (Wiktionary)
- Languages of Pakistan
- Hunza Valley
- Nagar Valley
- Gilgit-Baltistan
- Partawi Shah
- Nihali language
- Kusunda language

== Bibliography ==
- Anderson, Gregory D. S. 1997. Burushaski Morphology. In Morphologies of Asia and Africa, ed. by Alan Kaye. Winona Lake, IN: Eisenbrauns.
- Anderson, Gregory D. S. 1997. Burushaski Phonology. In Phonologies of Asia and Africa, ed. by Alan Kaye. Winona Lake, IN: Eisenbrauns.
- Anderson, Gregory D. S. 1999. M. Witzel's "South Asian Substrate Languages" from a Burushaski Perspective. Mother Tongue (Special Issue, October 1999).
- Anderson, Gregory D. S. forthcoming b. Burushaski. In Language Islands: Isolates and Microfamilies of Eurasia, ed. by D.A. Abondolo. London: Curzon Press.
- Backstrom, Peter C. Burushaski in Backstrom and Radloff (eds.), Languages of northern areas, Sociolinguistic Survey of Northern Pakistan, 2. Islamabad, National Institute of Pakistan Studies, Qaid-i-Azam University and Summer Institute of Linguistics (1992), 31–54.
- Berger, Hermann. 1974. Das Yasin-Burushaski (Werchikwar). Volume 3 of Neuindische Studien, ed. by Hermann Berger, Lothar Lutze and Günther Sontheimer. Wiesbaden: Otto Harrassowitz.
- Berger, Hermann. 1998. Die Burushaski-Sprache von Hunza und Nager [The B. language of H. and N.]. Three volumes: Grammatik [grammar], Texte mit Übersetzungen [texts with translations], Wörterbuch [dictionary]. Altogether Volume 13 of Neuindische Studien (ed. by Hermann Berger, Heidrun Brückner and Lothar Lutze). Wiesbaden: Otto Harassowitz.
- Grune, Dick. 1998. Burushaski – An Extraordinary Language in the Karakoram Mountains.
- Holst, Jan Henrik (2014). Advances in Burushaski Linguistics. Tübingen: Narr. ISBN 978-3-8233-6908-0.
- Karim, Piar. 2013. Middle Voice Construction in Burushaski: From the Perspective of a Native Speaker of the Hunza Dialect. Unpublished MA Thesis. Denton: University of North Texas. Department of Linguistics.
- Morgenstierne, Georg. 1945. Notes on Burushaski Phonology. Norsk Tidsskrift for Sprogvidenskap 13: 61–95.
- Lorimer, D. L. R. 1937. Burushaski and its Alien Neighbours.
- Munshi, Sadaf. 2006. Jammu and Kashmir Burushaski: Language, language contact, and change. Unpublished Ph.D. Dissertation. Austin: University of Texas at Austin, Department of Linguistics.
- Munshi, Sadaf. 2010. "Contact-induced language change in a trilingual context: the case of Burushaski in Srinagar". In Diachronica. John Benjamins Publishing Company. 27.1: pp32–72.
