= Floating man =

Thought experiment by Ibn Sina

The floating man, flying man, or man suspended in air argument is a thought experiment by the Persian philosopher Ibn Sina (Avicenna) that argues for the existence of the soul. This thought experiment is used to argue in favor of knowledge by presence.

== Background ==
Ibn Sina wrote the argument while imprisoned in the castle of Fardajan in Hamadan Province, Iran. He concluded that the soul is immaterial and substantial. He also claimed that no human could deny their own consciousness. According to Ibn Sina, the floating man could attain the concept of being without any sense experience.

Ibn Sina saved one of the Iranian rulers, Shams al-Dawla, from death, which caused envy among the courtiers. Following Shams al-Dawla death, Ibn Sina was arrested and imprisoned in a castle between the Iranian provinces of Hamadan and Isfahan, where he supposedly wrote the floating man argument. The name of that castle is recorded in the old books as "Fardjan," "Mazdjan," or "Mazdavan."

== The subject in the original text ==
Ibn Sina's original text does not specify the subject's gender. The Arabic describes insān, a generic human being. One modern translation renders the scenario as the creation of "a human — for example, Adam or Eve", who would still affirm "his or her" existence. The masculine wording familiar from many English versions is a translation convention rather than a feature of the original thought experiment.

== Concept ==
The floating man argument considers a person who falls or floats freely in the air, unable to touch or perceive anything, as in a modern sensory deprivation chamber. The subject lacks sensory information about the material world, yet remains self-aware and able to think.

The Floating Man argument that is known today is the product of three distinct related versions. In the early days of its creation, Ibn Sina attempts to prove the separability of consciousness from the physical body. This initial version focuses on the principle of existential separability, which concerns the self and its ability to conceptualize its own existence. To develop his argument further, Ibn Sina introduces a second version based on conceptual separability. In this version, Sina creates a new ideology which details that because the body and self are perceptible, one is able to conceptualize the self without the associated bodily parts. In the final edition of his argument, Sina brings into question self-awareness and the continuity of consciousness.

Ibn Sina describes the eyes as the only obstacle to perceiving anything externally, and pictures the floating man as created in the air, like a vacuum, so that nothing overlaps and the form can continue connecting without obstruction. The extremities are separate and not interlocked, and because of that separation the subject has no consciousness of any limbs, innards, heart, or anything else that is truly external. The subject will not know their own length, breadth, or depth, but will be aware of the existence of their essence. Even if conscious of the extremities, the subject would perceive them only as part of that essence, not as parts of the body. The subject is therefore instructed to pay attention to the existence of the soul as something separate from the body and immaterial.

=== Existential separability ===
This form of separability concentrates on the unavoidable truth that exists within the self. The concept deals with the affirmation of the self, independent of anything - a certainty that exists naturally. Sina uses the word ānniyya to describe individual existence or quiddity, and declares its independence from the physical realm. Sina asserts the intrinsic essence of the ānniyya, regardless of its quantitative and qualitative characteristics.

=== Conceptual separability ===
This version of separability expands on the ability to conceptualize the body and to conceive the self as a separate entity accordingly. When defining the ānniyya as a separate entity from the body, Sina believes it is essential to distinguish the external limbs and parts from the internal organs, specifically the brain. This is primarily due to the impossibility of determining whether the self would even be conceivable without the brain as a vessel. Sina argues that there must be a relationship between the intellect and the brain. However, none between the self and sensory stimuli or the external body.

=== The immediateness and constancy of self-awareness ===
Sina argues that the self is immediate and is determined by no preceding action or activity. He states that no measure or operation could produce self-awareness. Similarly, Sina proclaims the continuity of self-awareness and that there is never a point at which the mind is unaware of itself. He insists that a circumstance whereupon the absolute state of self-awareness would be interrupted, is impossible.

== Premises of the argument ==
According to Ibn Sina, we cannot deny the consciousness of the self. His argument is as follows:

One of us must suppose that he was just created at a stroke, fully developed and perfectly formed but with his vision shrouded from perceiving all external objects – created floating in the air or in the space, not buffeted by any perceptible current of the air that supports him, his limbs separated and kept out of contact with one another, so that they do not feel each other. Then let the subject consider whether he would affirm the existence of his self. There is no doubt that he would affirm his own existence, although not affirming the reality of any of his limbs or inner organs, his bowels, or heart or brain or any external thing. Indeed he would affirm the existence of this self of his while not affirming that it had any length, breadth or depth. And if it were possible for him in such a state to imagine a hand or any other organ, he would not imagine it to be a part of himself or a condition of his existence.

— Ibn Sina, quoted in Goodman (2013, pp. 155–156)

Ibn Sina's floating man argument can be summarized in the following points:

1. The Floating Man is conscious of the existence of their soul without being conscious of the existence of their body.

2. The Floating Man validates the existence of their soul without validating the existence of their body.

3. When the Floating Man is taken out of their body; all that is left is their soul, which is validated in itself.

Therefore, one may determine that:

4. Rejecting the existence of their soul is unimaginable, since it is necessary for their existence.

5. Rejecting the existence of their body is plausible, since it is not necessary condition to validate their existence.

6. Following the points 4 and 5: validating the existence of the soul without validating the existence of the body is plausible.

This argument relies on an introspective thought experiment. We have to suppose a person who comes into existence fully developed and formed, but they don't have any relation with sensory experience of the world or of their own body. There is no physical contact with the external world at all. According to Ibn Sina, this subject is, nonetheless, necessarily conscious of themself. In other words, such a being possesses the awareness of their own existence. The subject thereby believes that the soul has an unmediated and reflexive knowledge of its own existence. Thus appealing to self-consciousness, Ibn Sina tries to prove the existence of soul, or Nafs. Some scholars like Wisnovsky believe that the flying man argument proved the substantiality of the soul. Ibn Sina believes that innate awareness is completely independent of sensory experience.

== Dualist perspective ==
The Floating Man argument supports dualism, the idea that the mental realm is separate from the physical world, including the physical body. In the floating man argument, Ibn Sina affirms the existence of a mental self, even in the absence of physical perception. Many dualist philosophers have used this thought experiment to confirm the essence of the soul and other arguments of dualist origin.

Descartes' famous phrase "Cogito ergo sum" ("I think, therefore I am") bears resemblance to the Floating Man argument, and some even believe Descartes to be inspired by Ibn Sina in that both argue for knowledge by presence. Whether these similarities are deep or trivial is a matter of scholarly disagreement.

== Criticism ==
Adamson argues that even if the person floating in the air were aware of themself, the argument fails to prove that the soul (the seat of that awareness) is separate from the body. One could argue that self-awareness is located in the brain. In being self-aware, the floating man is aware only through a property of the nervous system, whether or not they are aware of it.

Ibn Sina's argument is not supported by the concept of substance in metaphysics. This experiential field shows that the self is not consequently a substance and thereby there is no subjectivity.

== See also ==
- Islamic philosophy
- Sensory deprivation
- Duality (mathematics)
- Mind–body dualism
- Property dualism
- Soul dualism

== Bibliography ==
- Adamson, Peter; Taylor, Richard C., eds. (2005). The Cambridge Companion to Arabic Philosophy. Cambridge University Press. ISBN 0-521-81743-9.
- Adamson, Peter (24 September 2015). Philosophy in the Islamic World: A Very Short Introduction. OUP Oxford. ISBN 978-0-19-150659-8.
- Black, Deborah L. (2008). "Avicenna on self-awareness and knowing that one knows" (PDF). In Rahman, S.; Street, T.; Tahiri, H. (eds.). The Unity of Science in the Arabic Tradition. Logic, Epistemology, and The Unity of Science. Vol. 11. Dordrecht: Springer. pp. 63–87. doi:10.1007/978-1-4020-8405-8_3. ISBN 978-1-4020-8404-1.
- McGinnis, Jon (2010). Avicenna. Great Medieval Thinkers. Oxford University Press. ISBN 978-0-19-533147-9.
- Goodman, L. E. (2013). Avicenna: Arabic Thought and Culture. Routledge Press. ISBN 978-1134977796.
- Groff, Peter S.; Leaman, Oliver (2007). Islamic Philosophy A–Z. Edinburgh University Press. ISBN 978-0-7486-2216-0.
- El-Bizri, Nader (2000). The Phenomenological Quest Between Avicenna and Heidegger. Global Academic Publishing. ISBN 978-1-58684-005-1.
