= Yaqeen =

Summit of spiritual path in mystic Islam

Yaqeen (Arabic: یقین) is generally translated as "certainty", and is considered the summit of the many stations by which the path of walaya (sometimes translated as Sainthood) is fully completed. This is the repository of liberating experience in Islam. In relation to the exoteric religious life, certainty is the sister of religious life in its perfection (ehsân), that is, to say the adoration of Allah according to the visionary way; through this channel it is the pillar of Islam in the accomplishment of its external practices, as it is the foundation of faith (iman) in its internal dogma. It is, in fact, ihsân which gives the external religion its true meaning and the domain of faith its real values. It occurs in the Quran about certainty, "And worship your Lord until there comes to you the certainty". Certainty (yaqeen) comprises three degrees.

== Stages ==
In Islamic thought, yaqeen is regarded as a lofty spiritual state, described as having several distinct levels. Scholars and sufi masters generally mention five stages:

1. Ism al-yaqeen
2. Rasm al-yaqeen
3. ʿIlm al-yaqeen
4. ʿAyn al-yaqeen
5. Ḥaqq al-yaqeen

=== Ism al-yaqeen ===
Ism al-yaqeen (certainty by name) is the most basic level of certainty, limited to recognition of the concept by name only.

=== Rasm al-yaqeen ===
Rasm al-yaqeen (certainty by form) is certainty understood only in its outward form or symbolic expression, without deeper realization.

=== ʿIlm al-yaqeen (the knowledge of certainty) ===
The first degree is referred to by the name ‘ilm-ul-yaqeen (the knowledge of certainty), which means that certainty is the result of knowledge. At this degree the object of certainty is knowledge just as the aim of knowledge is certainty. Both together are in the soul uniquely, such that certainty is the first degree of spiritual life and the last of speculative experience. This particular degree of mystical yaqeen is the result of divine theophanies in act at the level of existence and also the result of theophanies of lights of nature at the gnostic level.

=== ʿAyn al-yaqeen (the vision of certainty) ===
The second degree of yaqeen is what one calls in Sufi terms ayn-ul-yaqeen (the vision of certainty), that is, certainty as a consequence of contemplation and vision. At this level, the object of certainty is present in front of the gnostic and is not only a speculative concept. Here knowledge becomes what one calls ilm-e-huzuri (knowledge by Presence), and that is the second aspect of Certainty in the spiritual way and in liberating experience. By this kind of knowledge, the man of the Way is distinguished from philosophers and learned men. This particular degree of spiritual Certainty is the result of divine theophanies of Attributes at the level of existence.

=== Ḥaqq al-yaqeen (the final level of certainty gained through experience) ===
Finally, the last degree of yaqeen is called haqq-ul-yaqeen (the level of certainty gained through experience), that is, certainty as supreme truth. Here, certainty has a particular coloring: it is the fruit of an all-embracing experience because the object of certainty is identical to the one who is experiencing it, knowledge being transformed into actual experience and actual experience into knowledge. At this stage, in fact, knowledge is not limited to the intellect, nor to the vision of the one who is contemplating it, it becomes one with the human being. This is the final phase of yaqeen, the apotheosis of the spiritual and intellectual journey. This high degree of Sufi certainty is the effect of the Emanation of the divine Theophanies in Essence at its existential level and that of the diffusion of the Light of lights (Dazzling Irradiations) at the level of the theophanies of the gnostic.

== See also ==
- Baqaa
- Ground Luminosity
- Three Bodies
- Nūr (Islam)
