= Baqaa =

Islamic and Sufi concept

Baqaa (Arabic: بقاء, romanized: baqāʾ, lit. 'perpetual existence') is a term in Sufi philosophy which describes a particular state of life with God in Islam; through God, in God, and for God. The related term دَار اَلْبَقَاء, literally "land of baqāʾ", is a term for Heaven. It is the summit of the mystical manazil, destination or abode. Baqaa comprises three degrees, each one referring to a particular aspect of theophanies as the principle of existence and its qualitative evolution, consisting of faith, knowledge, and grace. It is the stage where the seeker finally gets ready for the constant vision of God. Hence, it can be termed as Divine Eternity.

== Relationship to fanāʾ ==
Baqāʾ is understood as forming a correlative pair with fanāʾ, with fanāʾ logically preceding baqāʾ. The concept operates on two levels: the passing away of human consciousness into the divine, and the replacement of imperfect qualities of the soul with new, divinely bestowed attributes. Of the two terms, fanāʾ is generally regarded as the more significant in Sufi writings. While baqāʾ has been compared to concepts such as the Buddhist nirvana, scholars note that the transition it describes is not a total annihilation, since the Sufi's self is not reduced to complete nothingness, but is instead purified and drawn toward higher forms of being.

== Theological development ==
Scholars trace the historical development of the fanāʾ–baqāʾ teaching through a succession of early Sufi figures: originally conceived by Dhu'l-Nun al-Misri, developed by Sahl al-Tustari, spread within Sufi circles by Junayd of Baghdad, publicly proclaimed by al-Hallaj, and further articulated by Abu Bakr al-Shibli. In its developed form, the experience is understood in Sufism as al-fanāʾ ʿan al-nafs (passing away from the self) and al-baqāʾ billāh (subsistence through God), and ultimately as al-fanāʾ fīllāh (passing away in God) — but explicitly not as al-fanāʾ ʿan Allāh (passing away from God), a distinction maintained to avoid implications of pantheism or the mystic's complete dissolution into the divine essence. At an advanced stage, the mystic is said to take on divine attributes, a state some Sufi writers described as becoming capable of exercising qualities of divine bounty and justice.

Some scholars have proposed external influences on the doctrine, such as R. C. Zaehner's suggestion of a connection to Hindu philosophy, including the Upanishadic concept tat tvam asi; this view, along with the claim that Bayazid Bastami was the first to introduce the term fanāʾ into Sufism, has been disputed by other scholars.

== See also ==
- Fana (Sufism)
- Shath
- Wahdat al-wujūd
- Moksha
- Nirvana
