= Knowledge by presence =

Theory of knowledge in Islamic philosophy

Knowledge by presence (Persian: علم حضوری, transliterated ilm-e-huzuri) or consciousness is a degree and kind of primordial knowledge in the Illuminationist school of Islamic philosophy. This knowledge is also called the illuminative doctrine of knowledge by presence or al-ilm al-huduri al-ishraqi. This theory is attributed to Shahab al-Din Suhrawardi. According to this theory, one knows himself directly through a kind of cognition.

== Concept ==
Humans in their ordinary experience show themselves as the primary subject of knowledge. Humans communicated with non-humans with different methods such as mind, language and reason. In any kind of knowledge and before any knowledge, always there is a kind of knowledge called knowledge of oneself or consciousness. This consciousness is foremost and prior to any knowledge.

According to Mehdi Haeri Yazdi, the knowledge by presence is a sort of knowledge which has all relations within its paradigm. In this kind of knowledge there is a self-object relation without the interference of a connection with an external object. In this kind of knowledge, the sense of knowledge is equal with the self. In the sphere of the self, both to exist and to know are identical. The fact of knowledge by presence is not identical with conceptualism and representation. Although this kind of knowledge is expressed by proposition, but is not as the same as knowledge by concept. Knowledge by presence has characters such as being personal, non-transferable, admitting different levels and development. In knowledge by presence, the object is present to the subject.

== Historical background ==
Al Farabi is known for his famous Doctrine, namely harmonization of opinions of Aristotle and Plato. On the one hand Al-Farabi believes that Aristotle rejected Plato's Forms, but Aristotle himself, on the other hand, had difficulty with divine forms. Avicenna developed the notion of knowledge by presence in the argument of the floating man. According to this argument, if we consider the I-ness of a human in absolutely empty air, then the only thing to conceive is the selfness of a human without any material faculties. On one hand Surevardi criticized Avicenna's theory of knowledge which is based on the important roles of definitions. On the other hand Suhrevardi introduced innate knowledge in which awareness and consciousness are basic. According to Suhrevardi, knowledge by presence encompasses the conception of a thing, which is along with assent to it. According to Suhrevardi's theory of knowledge, the true knowledge is achieved not by concepts but through a direct knowledge of things divine. Illuminationist philosophers know the knowledge of two kinds, of which knowledge by presence is one of them. Knowledge by presence is of a nonrepresentational, immediate character along with no reference to external objects. According to Suhrevardi, the "self" could know itself just by virtue of its presence. It also knows consciousness beyond the distinction of the subject and object division in epistemology. According to Suhrevardi, it is also described by self-objectivity, namely the nature of this knowledge is to the reality of awareness and in this knowledge the self is aware it is existentially one and the same thing. Therefore, the self and consciousness of the self are individually and numerically one thing. Surevardi also pointed out that all knowledge is returned to knowledge by presence. In other words in representational knowledge the presence of an image in the mind in turn is a kind of knowledge by presence.

== Characteristics ==
There are many characters for knowledge by presence, including:

- There are no differences between subjective and objective objects, namely both of them are the same.
- Knowledge by presence is free from dualism, and falsity and truth.
- This kind of knowledge belongs to the sphere of being and therefore has nothing to do with conceptualization and representation.

== See also ==
- Sakīnah
- Scientia sacra
- Yaqeen – Summit of spiritual path in mystic Islam
- Self-evidence – Epistemologically probative proposition
