= Idries Shah =

Afghan writer and Sufi teacher (1924–1996)

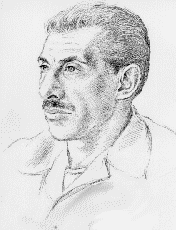
- Born: Idries Shah; 16 June 1924; Simla, Punjab Province (British India)
- Died: 23 November 1996 (aged 72); London, England, UK
- Occupations: Writer, publisher
- Spouse: Cynthia (Kashfi) Kabraji
- Children: Saira Shah, Tahir Shah, Safia Shah
- Writing career
- Pen name: Arkon Daraul
- Genres: Eastern philosophy and culture
- Subjects: Sufism, psychology
- Notable works: The Sufis; The Commanding Self; The Subtleties of the Inimitable Mulla Nasrudin; The Exploits of the Incomparable Mulla Nasrudin; Thinkers of the East; Learning How to Learn; The Way of the Sufi; Reflections; Kara Kush
- Notable awards: Outstanding Book of the Year (BBC "The Critics"), twice; six first prizes at the UNESCO World Book Year in 1973
- Website: idriesshahfoundation.org

Idries Shah (/ˈɪdrɪs ˈʃɑː/; Hindi: इदरीस शाह, Urdu: ادریس شاه; 16 June 1924 – 23 November 1996), also known as Idris Shah, Indries Shah, né Sayed Idries el-Hashimi (Arabic: سيد إدريس هاشمي) and by the pen name Arkon Daraul, was an Afghan author, thinker and teacher in the Sufi tradition. Shah wrote over three dozen books on topics ranging from psychology and spirituality to travelogues and culture studies.

Born in British India, the descendant of a family of Afghan nobles on his father's side and a Scottish mother, Shah grew up mainly in England. His early writings examined magic and witchcraft. In 1960 he established a publishing house, Octagon Press, producing translations of Sufi classics as well as titles of his own. His seminal work was The Sufis, which appeared in 1964 and was well received internationally. In 1965, Shah founded the Institute for Cultural Research, a London-based educational charity devoted to the study of human behaviour and culture. A similar organisation, the Institute for the Study of Human Knowledge (ISHK), was established in the United States under the directorship of Stanford University psychology professor Robert Ornstein, whom Shah appointed as his deputy in the U.S.

In his writings, Shah presented Sufism as a universal form of wisdom that predated Islam. Emphasizing that Sufism was not static but always adapted itself to the current time, place and people, he framed his teaching in Western psychological terms. Shah made extensive use of traditional teaching stories and parables, texts that contained multiple layers of meaning designed to trigger insight and self-reflection in the reader. He is perhaps best known for his collections of humorous Mulla Nasrudin stories.

Shah was at times criticized by orientalists who questioned his credentials and background. His role in the controversy surrounding a new translation of the Rubaiyat of Omar Khayyam, published by his friend Robert Graves and his older brother Omar Ali-Shah, came in for particular scrutiny. However, he also had many notable defenders, chief among them the novelist Doris Lessing. Shah came to be recognized as a spokesman for Sufism in the West and lectured as a visiting professor at a number of Western universities.

== Life ==
=== Family and early life ===
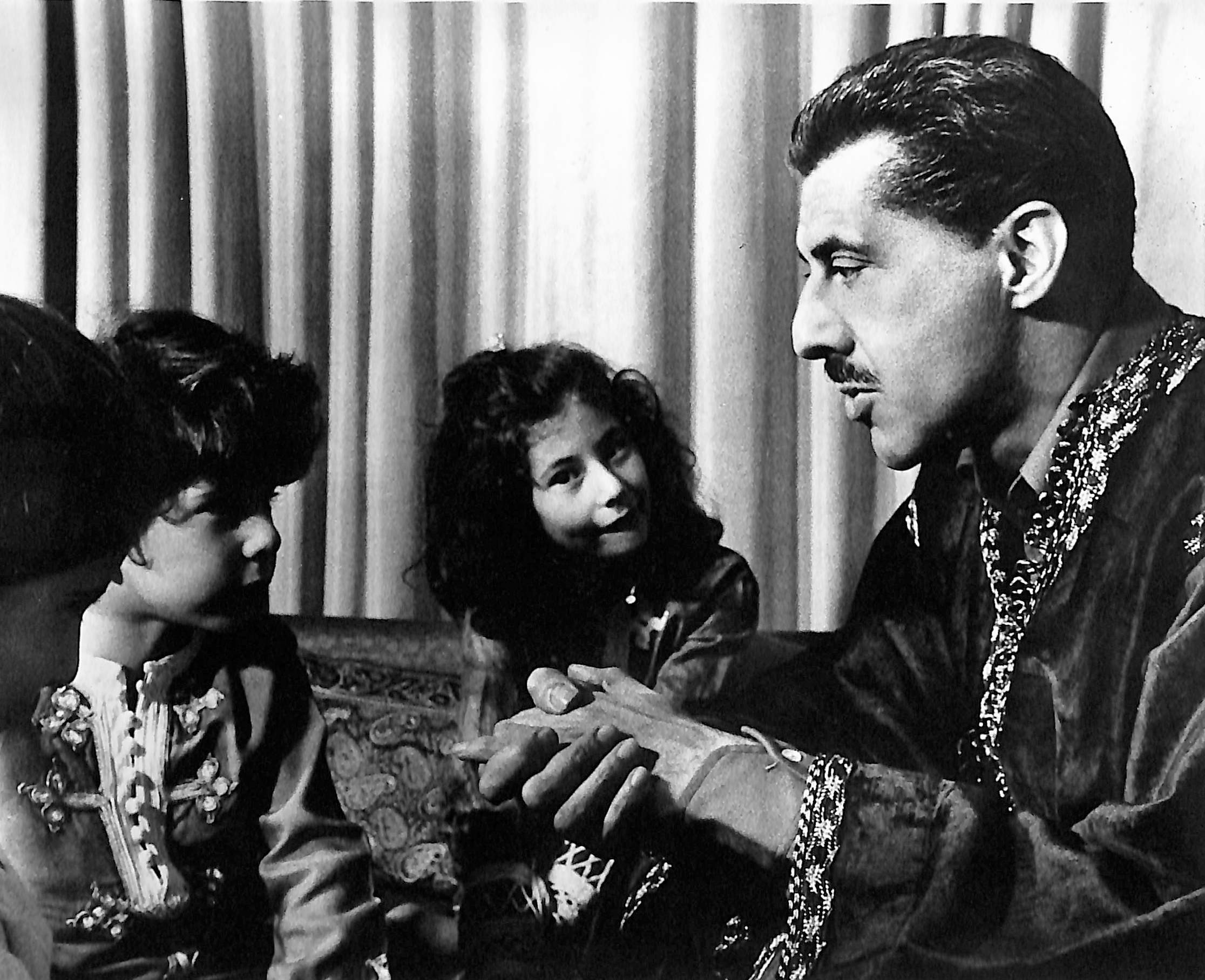
Idries Shah telling a story to his children

Idries Shah was born in Simla, Punjab Province, British India, to an Afghan-Indian father; Sirdar Ikbal Ali Shah, a writer and diplomat, and a Scottish mother; Saira Elizabeth Luiza Shah. His family on the paternal side were Musavi Sayyids. Their ancestral home was near the Paghman Gardens of Kabul, Afghanistan. His paternal grandfather, Sayed Amjad Ali Shah, was the nawab of Sardhana in the North-Indian state of Uttar Pradesh, a hereditary title the family had gained thanks to the services an earlier ancestor, Jan-Fishan Khan, had rendered to the British.

Shah mainly grew up in the vicinity of London. According to L. F. Rushbrook Williams, Shah began accompanying his father in his travels from a very young age, and although they both travelled widely and often, they always returned to England, where the family made their home for many years. Through these travels, which were often part of Ikbal Ali Shah's Sufi work, Shah was able to meet and spend time with prominent statesmen and distinguished personalities in both East and West. Williams writes,

Such an upbringing presented to a young man of marked intelligence, such as Idries Shah soon proved himself to possess, many opportunities to acquire a truly international outlook, a broad vision, and an acquaintance with people and places that any professional diplomat of more advanced age and longer experience might well envy. But a career of diplomacy did not attract Idries Shah...

Shah described his own unconventional upbringing in a 1971 BBC interview with Pat Williams. He described how his father and his extended family and friends always tried to expose the children to a "multiplicity of impacts" and a wide range of contacts and experiences with the intention of producing a well-rounded person. Shah described this as "the Sufi approach" to education.

After his family moved from London to Oxford in 1940 to escape The Blitz (German bombing), he spent two or three years at the City of Oxford High School for Boys. In 1945, he accompanied his father to Uruguay as secretary to his father's halal meat mission. He returned to England in October 1946, following allegations of improper business dealings.

=== Personal life ===
Shah married Parsi-Zoroastrian Cynthia (Kashfi) Kabraji, daughter of the Indian poet Fredoon Kabraji, in 1958. The couple had a daughter, Saira Shah, in 1964, followed by fraternal twins in 1966 – a son, Tahir Shah, and another daughter, Safia Shah.

=== Friendship with Gerald Gardner and Robert Graves, and publication of The Sufis ===
Towards the end of the 1950s, Shah established contact with Wiccan circles in London and then acted as a secretary and companion to Gerald Gardner, the founder of modern Wicca, for some time. In those days, Shah used to hold court for anyone interested in Sufism at a table in the Cosmo restaurant in Swiss Cottage (North London) every Tuesday evening.

In 1960, Shah founded his publishing house, Octagon Press; one of its first titles was Gardner's biography – Gerald Gardner, Witch. The book was attributed to one of Gardner's followers, Jack L. Bracelin, but had in fact been written by Shah.

According to Wiccan Frederic Lamond, Bracelin's name was used because Shah "did not want to confuse his Sufi students by being seen to take an interest in another esoteric tradition." Lamond said that Shah seemed to have become somewhat disillusioned with Gardner, and had told him one day, when he was visiting for tea:

When I was interviewing Gerald, I sometimes wished I was a News of the World reporter. What marvellous material for an exposé! And yet I have it on good authority that this group will be the cornerstone of the religion of the coming age. But rationally, rationally I can't see it!

In January 1961, while on a trip to Mallorca with Gardner, Shah met the English poet Robert Graves. Shah wrote to Graves from his pension in Palma, requesting an opportunity of "saluting you one day before very long". He added that he was currently researching ecstatic religions, and that he had been "attending... experiments conducted by the witches in Britain, into mushroom-eating and so on" – a topic that had been of interest to Graves for some time.

Shah also told Graves that he was "intensely preoccupied at the moment with the carrying forward of ecstatic and intuitive knowledge." Graves and Shah soon became close friends and confidants. Graves took a supportive interest in Shah's writing career and encouraged him to publish an authoritative treatment of Sufism for a Western readership, along with the practical means for its study; this was to become The Sufis. Shah managed to obtain a substantial advance on the book, resolving temporary financial difficulties.

In 1964, The Sufis appeared, published by Doubleday, Robert Graves's American publisher, with a long introduction by Graves. The book chronicles the impact of Sufism on the development of Western civilisation and traditions from the seventh century onward through the work of such figures as Roger Bacon, John of the Cross, Raymond Lully, Chaucer and others. Like Shah's other books on the topic, The Sufis was conspicuous for avoiding terminology that might have identified his interpretation of Sufism with traditional Islam.

The book also employed a deliberately "scattered" style; Shah wrote to Graves that its aim was to "de-condition people, and prevent their reconditioning"; had it been otherwise, he might have used a more conventional form of exposition. The book sold poorly at first, and Shah invested a considerable amount of his own money in advertising it. Graves told him not to worry; even though he had some misgivings about the writing, and was hurt that Shah had not allowed him to proofread it before publication, he said he was "so proud in having assisted in its publication", and assured Shah that it was "a marvellous book, and will be recognised as such before long. Leave it to find its own readers who will hear your voice spreading, not those envisaged by Doubleday."

=== John G. Bennett and the Gurdjieff connection ===
In June 1962, a couple of years prior to the publication of The Sufis, Shah had also established contact with members of the movement that had formed around the mystical teachings of Gurdjieff and Ouspensky. A press article had appeared, (Note: Augy Hayter, a student of both Idries and Omar Ali-Shah, asserts that the article, published in Blackwood's Magazine, was written by Idries Shah under a pseudonym. When Reggie Hoare, a Gurdjieffian and associate of Bennett's, wrote to the author care of the magazine, intrigued by the description of exercises known only to a very small number of Gurdjieff students, it was Shah who replied to Hoare, and Hoare who introduced Shah to Bennett. Shah himself according to Hayter later described the Blackwood's Magazine article as "trawling". (Hayter, Augy (2002). Fictions and Factions. Reno, NV/Paris, France: Tractus Books. p. 187. ISBN 2-909347-14-1.)) describing the author's visit to a secret monastery in Central Asia, where methods strikingly similar to Gurdjieff's methods were apparently being taught. The otherwise unattested monastery had, it was implied, a representative in England.

One of Ouspensky's earliest pupils, Reggie Hoare, who had been part of the Gurdjieff work since 1924, made contact with Shah through that article. Hoare "attached special significance to what Shah had told him about the enneagram symbol and said that Shah had revealed secrets about it that went far beyond what we had heard from Ouspensky." Through Hoare, Shah was introduced to other Gurdjieffians, including John G. Bennett, a noted Gurdjieff student and founder of an "Institute for the Comparative Study of History, Philosophy and the Sciences" located at Coombe Springs, a 7-acre (2.8-hectare) estate in Kingston upon Thames, Surrey.

At that time, Bennett had already investigated the Sufi origins of many of Gurdjieff's teachings, based on both Gurdjieff's own numerous statements, and on travels Bennett himself made in the East where he met various Sufi Sheikhs. He was convinced that Gurdjieff had adopted many of the ideas and techniques of the Sufis and that, for those who heard Gurdjieff's lectures in the early 1920s, "the Sufi origin of his teaching was unmistakable to anyone who had studied both."

Bennett wrote about his first meeting with Shah in his autobiography Witness (1974):

At first, I was wary. I had just decided to go forward on my own and now another 'teacher' had appeared. One or two conversations with Reggie convinced me that I ought at least to see for myself. Elizabeth and I went to dinner with the Hoares to meet Shah, who turned out to be a young man in his early 40s. He spoke impeccable English and but for his beard and some of his gestures might well have been taken for an English public school type. Our first impressions were unfavourable. He was restless, smoked incessantly and seemed too intent on making a good impression. Halfway through the evening, our attitude completely changed. We recognized that he was not only an unusually gifted man, but that he had the indefinable something that marks the man who has worked seriously upon himself... Knowing Reggie to be a very cautious man, trained moreover in assessing information by many years in the Intelligence Service, I accepted his assurances and also his belief that Shah had a very important mission in the West that we ought to help him to accomplish.

Shah gave Bennett a "Declaration of the People of the Tradition" and authorised him to share this with other Gurdjieffians. The document announced that there was now an opportunity for the transmission of "a secret, hidden, special, superior form of knowledge"; combined with the personal impression Bennett formed of Shah, it convinced Bennett that Shah was a genuine emissary of the "Sarmoung Monastery" in Afghanistan, an inner circle of Sufis whose teachings had inspired Gurdjieff.

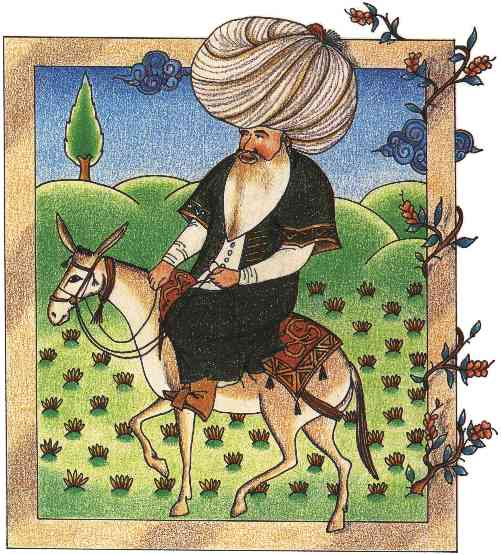
Whose Beard? Nasruddin dreamt that he had Satan's beard in his hand. Tugging the hair he cried: "The pain you feel is nothing compared to that which you inflict on the mortals you lead astray." And he gave the beard such a tug that he woke up yelling in agony. Only then did he realise that the beard he held in his hand was his own. — − Idries Shah

For the next few years, Bennett and Shah had weekly private talks that lasted for hours. Later, Shah also gave talks to the students at Coombe Springs. Bennett says that Shah's plans included "reaching people who occupied positions of authority and power who were already half-consciously aware that the problems of mankind could no longer be solved by economic, political or social action. Such people were touched, he said, by the new forces moving in the world to help mankind to survive the coming crisis."

Bennett agreed with these ideas and also agreed that "people attracted by overtly spiritual or esoteric movements seldom possessed the qualities needed to reach and occupy positions of authority" and that "there were sufficient grounds for believing that throughout the world there were already people occupying important positions, who were capable of looking beyond the limitations of nationality and cultures and who could see for themselves that the only hope for mankind lies in the intervention of a Higher Source."

Bennett wrote, "I had seen enough of Shah to know that he was no charlatan or idle boaster and that he was intensely serious about the task he had been given." Due to extreme pressure from Shah, Bennett decided in 1965, after agonising for a long time and discussing the matter with the council and members of his Institute, to give the Coombe Springs property to Shah, who had insisted that any such gift must be made with no strings attached. Once the property was transferred to Shah, he banned Bennett's associates from visiting, and made Bennett himself feel unwelcome.

Bennett says he did receive an invitation to the "Midsummer Revels", a party Shah held at Coombe Springs that lasted two days and two nights, primarily for the young people whom Shah was then attracting. Anthony Blake, who worked with Bennett for 15 years, says, "When Idries Shah acquired Coombe Springs, his main activity was giving parties. I had only a few encounters with him but much enjoyed his irreverent attitude. Bennett once said to me, 'There are different styles in the work. Mine is like Gurdjieff's, around struggle with one's denial. But Shah's way is to treat the work as a joke.'"

After a few months, Shah sold the plot – worth more than £100,000 – to a developer and used the proceeds to establish himself and his work activities at Langton House in Langton Green, near Tunbridge Wells, a 50-acre (20 ha) estate that once belonged to the family of Lord Baden-Powell, founder of the Boy Scouts.

Along with the Coombe Springs property, Bennett also handed the care of his body of pupils to Shah, comprising some 300 people. Shah promised he would integrate all those who were suitable; about half of their number found a place in Shah's work. Some 20 years later, the Gurdjieffian author James Moore suggested that Bennett had been duped by Shah. Bennett gave an account of the matter himself in his autobiography (1974); he said that Shah's behaviour after the transfer of the property was "hard to bear", but also insisted that Shah was a "man of exquisite manners and delicate sensibilities" and considered that Shah might have adopted his behaviour deliberately, "to make sure that all bonds with Coombe Springs were severed". He added that Langton Green was a far more suitable place for Shah's work than Coombe Springs could have been and said he felt no sadness that Coombe Springs lost its identity; he concluded his account of the matter by stating that he had "gained freedom" through his contact with Shah, and had learned "to love people whom [he] could not understand".

According to Bennett, Shah later also engaged in discussions with the heads of the Gurdjieff groups in New York. In a letter to Paul Anderson from 5 March 1968, Bennett wrote, "Madame de Salzmann and all the others... are aware of their own limitations and do no more than they are able to do. While I was in New York, Elizabeth and I visited the Foundation, and we saw most of the leading people in the New York group as well as Jeanne de Salzmann herself. Something is preparing, but whether it will come to fruition I cannot tell. I refer to their connection with Idries Shah and his capacity for turning everything upside down. It is useless with such people to be passive, and it is useless to avoid the issue. For the time being, we can only hope that some good will come, and meanwhile continue our own work..."

The author and clinical psychologist Kathleen Speeth later wrote,

Witnessing the growing conservatism within the [Gurdjieff] Foundation, John Bennett hoped new blood and leadership would come from elsewhere... Although there may have been flirtation with Shah, nothing came of it. The prevailing sense [among the leaders of the Gurdjieff work] that nothing must change, that a treasure in their safekeeping must at all costs be preserved in its original form, was stronger than any wish for a new wave of inspiration."

=== Sufi studies and institutes ===
In 1965, Shah founded the Society for Understanding Fundamental Ideas (SUFI), later renamed The Institute for Cultural Research (ICR) – an educational charity aimed at stimulating "study, debate, education and research into all aspects of human thought, behaviour and culture". He also established the Society for Sufi Studies (SSS).

Langton House at Langton Green became a place of gathering and discussion for poets, philosophers and statesmen from around the world, and an established part of the literary scene of the time. The ICR held meetings and gave lectures there, awarding fellowships to international scholars including Sir John Glubb, Aquila Berlas Kiani, Richard Gregory and Robert Cecil, the head of European studies at the University of Reading who became chairman of the institute in the early 1970s.

Shah was an early member and supporter of the Club of Rome. (Note: Some sources have described Shah as a "founding member" of the Club of Rome. Augy Hayter states, "To a certain extent, one can say that a good deal of the literature put out by Shah and friends under various pseudonyms was designed to act as a decoy. It occupied would-be students and opponents alike, and inflamed critics to quite amazing degree. A lot of it was fake: Shah knew perfectly well that he was not a founding member of the Club of Rome; he was a member for a short time and was politely asked to leave because he didn't turn up to meetings; but this mythology around Shah's public personage was necessary in order to provide the dream-lie without which no truth can exist, because a student must always have a choice."(Hayter, Augy (2002). Fictions and Factions. Reno, NV/Paris, France: Tractus Books. p. 262. ISBN 2-909347-14-1.)) Fellow Club of Rome members, such as scientist Alexander King made presentations at the institute.

Other visitors, pupils, and would-be pupils included the poet Ted Hughes, novelists J. D. Salinger, Alan Sillitoe and Doris Lessing, zoologist Desmond Morris, and psychologist Robert Ornstein. The interior of the house was decorated in a Middle-Eastern fashion, and buffet lunches were held every Sunday for guests in a large dining room that was once the estate stable, nicknamed "The Elephant" (a reference to the Eastern tale of the "Elephant in the Dark").

Over the following years, Shah developed Octagon Press as a means of publishing and distributing reprints of translations of numerous Sufi classics. In addition, he collected, translated and wrote thousands of Sufi tales, making these available to a Western audience through his books and lectures. Several of Shah's books feature the Mullah Nasruddin character, sometimes with illustrations provided by Richard Williams. In Shah's interpretation, the Mulla Nasruddin stories, previously considered a folkloric part of Muslim cultures, were presented as Sufi parables.

Nasruddin was featured in Shah's television documentary Dreamwalkers, which aired on the BBC in 1970. Segments included Richard Williams being interviewed about his unfinished animated film about Nasruddin, and scientist John Kermisch discussing the use of Nasruddin stories at the Rand Corporation Think Tank. Other guests included the British psychiatrist William Sargant discussing the hampering effects of brainwashing and social conditioning on creativity and problem-solving, and the comedian Marty Feldman talking with Shah about the role of humour and ritual in human life. The program ended with Shah asserting that humanity could further its own evolution by "breaking psychological limitations" but that there was a "constant accretion of pessimism which effectively prevents evolution in this form from going ahead... Man is asleep – must he die before he wakes up?"

Shah also organised Sufi study groups in the United States. Claudio Naranjo, a Chilean psychiatrist who was teaching in California in the late 1960s, says that, after being "disappointed in the extent to which Gurdjieff's school entailed a living lineage", he had turned towards Sufism and had "become part of a group under the guidance of Idries Shah." Naranjo co-wrote a book with Robert Ornstein, entitled On The Psychology of Meditation (1971). Both of them were associated with the University of California, San Francisco where Ornstein was a research psychologist at the Langley Porter Psychiatric Institute.

Ornstein was also president and founder of the Institute for the Study of Human Knowledge, established in 1969; seeing a need in the U.S. for books and collections on ancient and new ways of thinking, he formed the ISHK Book Service in 1972 as a central source for important contemporary and traditional literature, becoming the sole U.S. distributor of the works of Idries Shah published by Octagon Press.

Another Shah associate, the scientist and professor Leonard Lewin, who was teaching telecommunications at the University of Colorado at the time, set up Sufi study groups and other enterprises for the promotion of Sufi ideas like the Institute for Research on the Dissemination of Human Knowledge (IRDHK), and also edited an anthology of writings by and about Shah entitled The Diffusion of Sufi Ideas in the West (1972).

The planned animated feature film by Williams, provisionally titled The Amazing Nasruddin, never materialised, as the relationship between Williams and the Shah family soured in 1972 amid disputes about copyrights and funds; however, Williams later used some of the ideas for his film The Thief and the Cobbler.

=== Later years ===
Shah wrote around two dozen more books over the following decades, many of them drawing on classical Sufi sources. Achieving a huge worldwide circulation, his writings appealed primarily to an intellectually oriented Western audience. By translating Sufi teachings into contemporary psychological language, he presented them in vernacular and hence accessible terms. His folktales, illustrating Sufi wisdom through anecdote and example, proved particularly popular. Shah received and accepted invitations to lecture as a visiting professor at academic institutions including the University of California, the University of Geneva, the National University of La Plata and various English universities. Besides his literary and educational work, he found time to design an air ioniser (forming a company together with Coppy Laws) and run a number of textile, ceramics and electronics companies. He also undertook several journeys to his ancestral Afghanistan and involved himself in setting up relief efforts there; he drew on these experiences later on in his book Kara Kush, a novel about the Soviet–Afghan War.

=== Illness ===
In late spring of 1987, about a year after his final visit to Afghanistan, Shah suffered two successive and massive heart attacks. He was told that he had only eight per cent of his heart function left, and could not expect to survive. Despite intermittent bouts of illness, he continued working and produced further books over the next nine years.

=== Death ===
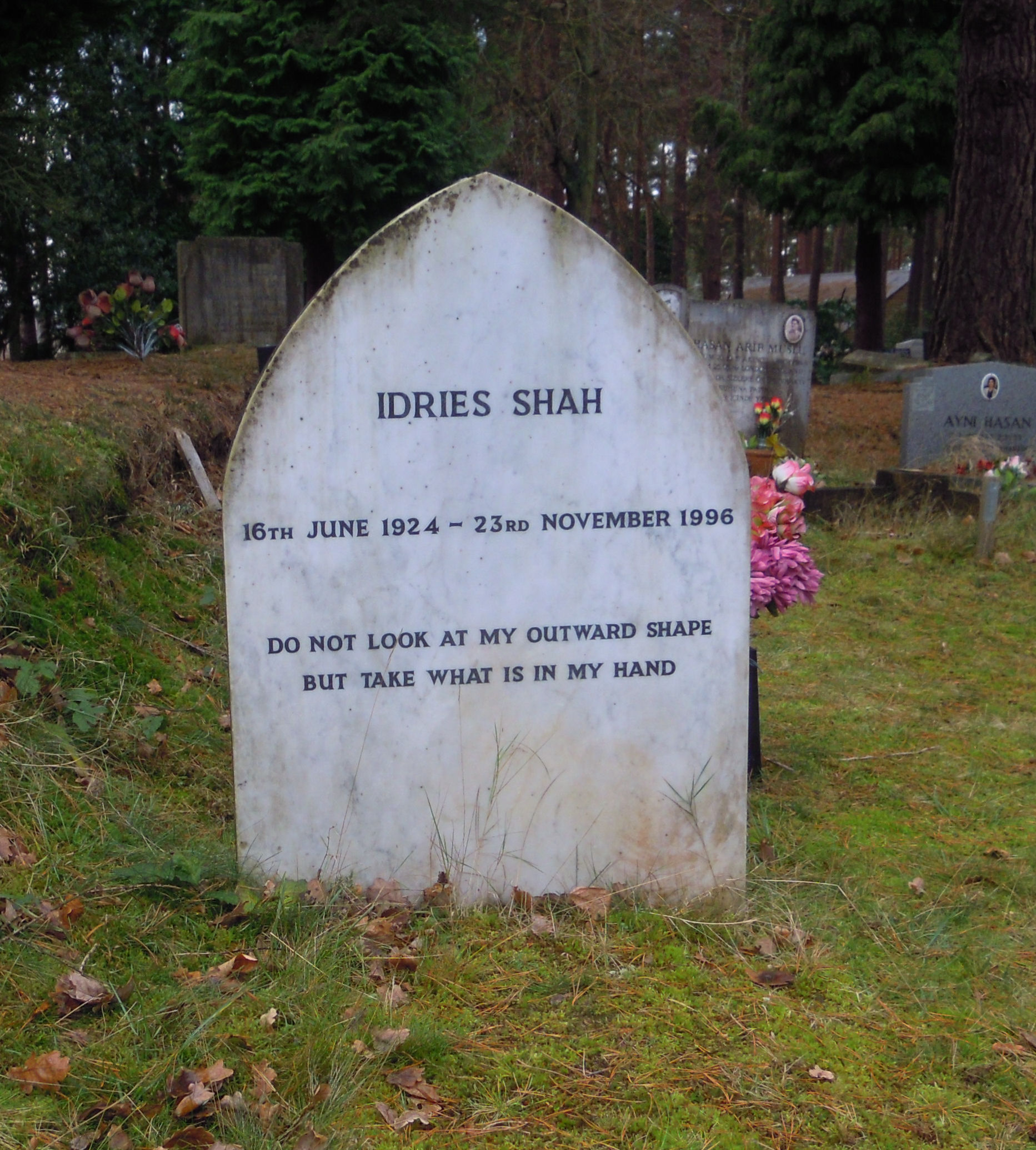
The grave of Idries Shah in Brookwood Cemetery

Idries Shah died in London on 23 November 1996, at the age of 72 and was buried in Brookwood Cemetery. According to his obituary in The Daily Telegraph, Idries Shah was a collaborator with Mujahideen in the Soviet–Afghan War, a Director of Studies for the Institute for Cultural Research and a Governor of the Royal Humane Society and the Royal Hospital and Home for Incurables. He was also a member of the Athenaeum Club. At the time of his death, Shah's books had sold over 15 million copies in a dozen languages worldwide, and had been reviewed in numerous international journals and newspapers.

== Teachings ==
=== Books on magic and the occult ===
Shah's early books were studies of what he called "minority beliefs". His first book Oriental Magic, published in 1956, was originally intended to be titled Considerations in Eastern and African Minority Beliefs. He followed this in 1957 with The Secret Lore of Magic: Book of the Sorcerers, originally entitled Some Materials on European Minority-Belief Literature. The names of these books were, according to a contributor to a 1973 festschrift for Shah, changed before publication due to the "exigencies of commercial publishing practices."

Before his death in 1969, Shah's father asserted that the reason why he and his son had published books on the subject of magic and the occult was "to forestall a probable popular revival or belief among a significant number of people in this nonsense. My son... eventually completed this task, when he researched for several years and published two important books on the subject."

In an interview in Psychology Today from 1975, Shah elaborated:

The main purpose of my books on magic was to make this material available to the general reader. For too long people believed that there were secret books, hidden places, and amazing things. They held onto this information as something to frighten themselves with. So the first purpose was information. This is the magic of East and West. That's all. There is no more. The second purpose of those books was to show that there do seem to be forces, some of which are either rationalized by this magic or may be developed from it, which do not come within customary physics or within the experience of ordinary people. I think this should be studied, that we should gather the data and analyze the phenomena. We need to separate the chemistry of magic from the alchemy, as it were.

Shah went on to say that his books on the subject were not written for the current devotees of magic and witchcraft, and that in fact he subsequently had to avoid them, as they would only be disappointed in what he had to say.

These books were followed by the publication of the travelogue Destination Mecca (1957), which was featured on television by Sir David Attenborough. Both Destination Mecca and Oriental Magic contain sections on the subject of Sufism.

=== Sufism as a form of timeless wisdom ===
Shah presented Sufism as a form of timeless wisdom that predated Islam. He emphasised that the nature of Sufism was alive, not static, and that it always adapted its visible manifestations to new times, places and people: "Sufi schools are like waves which break upon rocks: [they are] from the same sea, in different forms, for the same purpose," he wrote, quoting Ahmad al-Badawi.

Shah was often dismissive of orientalists' descriptions of Sufism, holding that academic or personal study of its historical forms and methods was not a sufficient basis for gaining a correct understanding of it. In fact, an obsession with its traditional forms might actually become an obstacle: "Show a man too many camels' bones, or show them to him too often, and he will not be able to recognise a camel when he comes across a live one," is how he expressed this idea in one of his books.

Shah, like Inayat Khan, presented Sufism as a path that transcended individual religions, and adapted it to a Western audience. Unlike Khan, however, he deemphasised religious or spiritual trappings and portrayed Sufism as a psychological technology, a method or science that could be used to achieve self-realisation. In doing so, his approach seemed to be especially addressed to followers of Gurdjieff, students of the Human Potential Movement, and intellectuals acquainted with modern psychology. For example, he wrote, "Sufism ... states that man may become objective, and that objectivity enables the individual to grasp 'higher' facts. Man is therefore invited to push his evolution ahead towards what is sometimes called in Sufism 'real intellect'." Shah taught that the human being could acquire new subtle sense organs in response to need:

Sufis believe that, expressed in one way, humanity is evolving towards a certain destiny. We are all taking part in that evolution. Organs come into being as a result of the need for specific organs (Rumi). The human being's organism is producing a new complex of organs in response to such a need. In this age of transcending of time and space, the complex of organs is concerned with the transcending of time and space. What ordinary people regard as sporadic and occasional outbursts of telepathic or prophetic power are seen by the Sufi as nothing less than the first stirrings of these same organs. The difference between all evolution up to date and the present need for evolution is that for the past ten thousand years or so we have been given the possibility of a conscious evolution. So essential is this more rarefied evolution that our future depends upon it.

— Idries Shah, The Sufis.

Shah dismissed other Eastern and Western projections of Sufism as "watered down, generalised or partial"; he included in this not only Khan's version, but also the overtly Muslim forms of Sufism found in most Islamic countries. On the other hand, the writings of Shah's associates implied that he was the "Grand Sheikh of the Sufis" – a position of authority undercut by the failure of any other Sufis to acknowledge its existence. Shah felt the best way to introduce Sufi wisdom in the West, while at the same time overcoming the problems of gurus and cults, was to clarify the difference between a cult and an educational system, and to contribute to knowledge. In an interview, he explained, "You must work within an educational pattern – not in the mumbo-jumbo area." As part of this approach, he acted as Director of Studies at the ICR. He also lectured on the study of Sufism in the West at the University of Sussex in 1966. This was later published as a monograph entitled Special Problems in the Study of Sufi Ideas.

Shah later explained that Sufi activities were divided into different components or departments: "studies in Sufism", "studies of Sufism", and "studies for Sufism".

Studies for Sufism helped lead people towards Sufism and included the promotion of knowledge which might be lacking in the culture and needed to be restored and spread, such as an understanding of social conditioning and brainwashing, the difference between the rational and intuitive modes of thought, and other activities so that people's minds could become more free and wide-ranging. Studies of Sufism included institutions and activities, such as lectures and seminars, which provided information about Sufism and acted as a cultural liaison between the Sufis and the public. Finally, Studies in Sufism referred to being in a Sufi school, carrying out those activities prescribed by the teacher as part of a training, and this could take many forms which did not necessarily fit into the preconceived notion of a "mystical school".

Shah's Sufi aims and methodologies were also delineated in the "Declaration of the People of the Tradition" given at Coombe Springs:

In addition to making this announcement, to feeding into certain fields of thought certain ideas, and pointing out some of the factors surrounding this work, the projectors of this declaration have a practical task. This task is to locate individuals who have the capacity for obtaining the special knowledge of man which is available; to group them in a special, not haphazard, manner, so that each such group forms a harmonious organism; to do this in the right place at the right time; to provide an external and interior format with which to work, as well as a formulation of 'ideas' suitable to local conditions; to balance theory with practice.

In a BBC interview from 1971, Shah explained his contemporary, adaptive approach: "I am interested in making available in the West those aspects of Sufism which shall be of use to the West at this time. I don't want to turn good Europeans into poor Asiatics. People have asked me why I don't use traditional methods of spiritual training, for instance, in dealing with people who seek me out or hunt me down; and of course, the answer is, that it's for the same reason that you came to my house today in a motorcar and not on the back of a camel. Sufism is, in fact, not a mystical system, not a religion, but a body of knowledge."

Shah frequently characterised some of his work as really only preliminary to actual Sufi study, in the same way that learning to read and write might be seen as preliminary to a study of literature: "Unless the psychology is correctly oriented, there is no spirituality, though there can be obsession and emotionality, often mistaken for it." "Anyone trying to graft spiritual practices upon an unregenerate personality ... will end up with an aberration", he argued. For this reason, most of the work he produced from The Sufis onwards was psychological in nature, focused on attacking the nafs-i-ammara, the false self: "I have nothing to give you except the way to understand how to seek – but you think you can already do that."

Shah was frequently criticised for not mentioning God very much in his writings; his reply was that given man's present state, there would not be much point in talking about God. He illustrated the problem in a parable in his book Thinkers of the East: "Finding I could speak the language of ants, I approached one and inquired, 'What is God like? Does he resemble the ant?' He answered, 'God! No indeed – we have only a single sting but God, He has two!'"

=== Teaching stories ===
Shah used teaching stories and humour to great effect in his work. Shah emphasised the therapeutic function of surprising anecdotes, and the fresh perspectives these tales revealed. The reading and discussion of such tales in a group setting became a significant part of the activities in which the members of Shah's study circles engaged. The transformative way in which these puzzling or surprising tales could destabilise the student's normal (and unaware) mode of consciousness was studied by Stanford University psychology professor Robert Ornstein, who along with fellow psychologist Charles Tart and eminent writers such as Poet Laureate Ted Hughes and Nobel-Prize-winning novelist Doris Lessing was one of several notable thinkers profoundly influenced by Shah.

Shah and Ornstein met in the 1960s. Realising that Ornstein could be an ideal partner in propagating his teachings, translating them into the idiom of psychotherapy, Shah made him his deputy (khalifa) in the United States. Ornstein's The Psychology of Consciousness (1972) was enthusiastically received by the academic psychology community, as it coincided with new interests in the field, such as the study of biofeedback and other techniques designed to achieve shifts in mood and awareness. Ornstein has published more books in the field over the years.

Philosopher of science and physicist Henri Bortoft used teaching tales from Shah's corpus as analogies of the habits of mind which prevented people from grasping the scientific method of Johann Wolfgang von Goethe. Bortoft's The Wholeness of Nature: Goethe's Way of Science includes tales from Tales of the Dervishes, The Exploits of the Incomparable Mullah Nasruddin and A Perfumed Scorpion.

In their original historical and cultural setting, Sufi teaching stories of the kind popularised by Shah – first told orally, and later written down for the purpose of transmitting Sufi faith and practice to successive generations – were considered suitable for people of all ages, including children, as they contained multiple layers of meaning. Shah likened the Sufi story to a peach: "A person may be emotionally stirred by the exterior as if the peach were lent to you. You can eat the peach and taste a further delight ... You can throw away the stone – or crack it and find a delicious kernel within. This is the hidden depth." It was in this manner that Shah invited his audience to receive the Sufi story. By failing to uncover the kernel, and regarding the story as merely amusing or superficial, a person would accomplish nothing more than looking at the peach, while others internalised the tale and allowed themselves to be touched by it.

Tahir Shah mentions his father's storytelling at several points throughout his 2008 book In Arabian Nights, first to discuss how Idries Shah made use of teaching stories: "My father never told us how the stories worked. He did not reveal the layers, the nuggets of information, the fragments of truth and fantasy. He didn't need to – because, given the right conditions, the stories activated, sowing themselves." He then explains how his father used these stories to impart wisdom: "My father always had a tale at hand to divert our attention, or to use as a way of transmitting an idea or a thought. He used to say that the great collections of stories from the East were like encyclopedias, storehouses of wisdom and knowledge ready to be studied, to be appreciated and cherished. To him, stories represented much more than mere entertainment. He saw them as complex psychological documents, forming a body of knowledge that had been collected and refined since the dawn of humanity and, more often than not, passed down by word of mouth."

Later on in the book, he continues his discussion of stories as teaching tools, quoting the following explanation his father gave him at the end of a story:

These stories are technical documents, they are like maps, or kind of blueprints. What I do is show people how to use the maps, because they have forgotten. You may think it's a strange way to teach – with stories – but long ago this was the way people passed on wisdom. Everyone knew how to take the wisdom from the story. They could see through the layers, in the same way you see a fish frozen in a block of ice. But the world where we are living has lost this skill, a skill they certainly once had. They hear the stories and they like them, because the stories amuse them, make them feel warm. But they can't see past the first layer, into the ice. The stories are like a lovely chessboard: we all know how to play chess and we can be drawn into a game so complicated that our faculties are drained. But imagine if the game was lost from a society for centuries and then the fine chessboard and its pieces were found. Everyone would cluster round to see them and praise them. They might never imagine that such a fine object ever had a purpose other than to entertain the eyes. The stories' inner value has been lost in the same way. At one time everyone knew how to play with them, how to decipher them. But now the rules have been forgotten. It is for us to show people again how the game is played.

— Tahir Shah, In Arabian Nights.

Olav Hammer, in Sufism in Europe and North America (2004), cites an example of such a story. It tells of a man who is looking for his key on the ground. When a passing neighbour asks the man whether this is in fact the place where he lost the key, the man replies, "No, I lost it at home, but there is more light here than in my own house." Versions of this story have been known for many years in the West (see Streetlight effect). This is an example of the long-noted phenomenon of similar tales existing in many different cultures, which was a central idea in Shah's folktale collection World Tales.

Peter Wilson, writing in New Trends and Developments in the World of Islam (1998), quotes another such story, featuring a dervish who is asked to describe the qualities of his teacher, Alim. The dervish explains that Alim wrote beautiful poetry, and inspired him with his self-sacrifice and his service to his fellow man. His questioner readily approves of these qualities, only to find the dervish rebuking him: "Those are the qualities which would have recommended Alim to you." Then he proceeds to list the qualities which actually enabled Alim to be an effective teacher: "Hazrat Alim Azimi made me irritated, which caused me to examine my irritation, to trace its source. Alim Azimi made me angry, so that I could feel and transform my anger." He explains that Alim Azimi followed the path of blame, intentionally provoking vicious attacks upon himself, in order to bring the failings of both his students and critics to light, allowing them to be seen for what they really were: "He showed us the strange, so that the strange became commonplace and we could realise what it really is."

=== Views on culture and practical life ===
Shah's concern was to reveal essentials underlying all cultures, and the hidden factors determining individual behaviour. He discounted the Western focus on appearances and superficialities, which often reflected mere fashion and habit, and drew attention to the origins of culture and the unconscious and mixed motivations of people and the groups formed by them. He pointed out how both on the individual and group levels, short-term disasters often turn into blessings – and vice versa – and yet the knowledge of this has done little to affect the way people respond to events as they occur.

Shah did not advocate the abandonment of worldly duties; instead, he argued that the treasure sought by the would-be disciple should derive from one's struggles in everyday living. He considered practical work the means through which a seeker could do self-work, in line with the traditional adoption by Sufis of ordinary professions, through which they earned their livelihoods and "worked" on themselves.

Shah's status as a teacher remained indefinable; disclaiming both the guru identity and any desire to found a cult or sect, he also rejected the academic hat. Michael Rubinstein, writing in Makers of Modern Culture, concluded that "he is perhaps best seen as an embodiment of the tradition in which the contemplative and intuitive aspects of the mind are regarded as being most productive when working together."

=== Legacy ===
Idries Shah considered his books his legacy; in themselves, they would fulfil the function he had fulfilled when he could no longer be there. Promoting and distributing their teacher's publications has been an important activity or "work" for Shah's students, both for fund-raising purposes and for transforming public awareness. The ICR suspended its activities in 2013 following the formation of a new charity, The Idries Shah Foundation, while the SSS had ceased its activities earlier. The ISHK (Institute for the Study of Human Knowledge), headed by Ornstein, is active in the United States; after the 9/11 terrorist attacks, for example, it sent out a brochure advertising Afghanistan-related books authored by Shah and his circle to members of the Middle East Studies Association, thus linking these publications to the need for improved cross-cultural understanding.

When Elizabeth Hall interviewed Shah for Psychology Today in July 1975, she asked him: "For the sake of humanity, what would you like to see happen?" Shah replied: "What I would really want, in case anybody is listening, is for the products of the last 50 years of psychological research to be studied by the public, by everybody, so that the findings become part of their way of thinking (...) they have this great body of psychological information and refuse to use it."

Shah's brother, Omar Ali-Shah (1922–2005), was also a writer and teacher of Sufism; the brothers taught students together for a while in the 1960s, but in 1977 "agreed to disagree" and went their separate ways. Following Idries Shah's death in 1996, a fair number of his students became affiliated with Omar Ali-Shah's movement.

One of Shah's daughters, Saira Shah, became notable in 2001 for reporting on women's rights in Afghanistan in her documentary Beneath the Veil. His son, Tahir Shah, is a noted travel writer, journalist and adventurer.

==== Translations ====
Idries Shah's works have been translated into many languages, such as French, German, Latvian, Persian, Polish, Russian, Spanish, Swedish, Turkish and others.

Idries Shah work was relatively late to reach the Polish reader. The pioneering translation into Polish was done by specialist in Iranian studies and translator Ivonna Nowicka who rendered the Tales of the Dervishes of her own initiative in 1999–2000. After a few unsuccessful attempts, she managed to find a publisher, the WAM Publishing House, and the book was finally published in 2002. The Wisdom of the Fools and The Magic Monastery in her translation followed in 2002 and 2003, respectively.

== Reception ==
Shah's books on Sufism achieved considerable critical acclaim. He was the subject of a BBC documentary ("One Pair of Eyes") in 1969, and two of his works (The Way of the Sufi and Reflections) were chosen as "Outstanding Book of the Year" by the BBC's "The Critics" programme. Among other honours, Shah won six first prizes at the UNESCO World Book Year in 1973, and the Islamic scholar James Kritzeck, commenting on Shah's Tales of the Dervishes, said that it was "beautifully translated".

A collection of positive assessments of Shah's work entitled Sufi Studies: East and West was published in 1973 which included, among others, contributions from L. F. Rushbrook Williams, Rom Landau, Mohammad Hidayatullah, Gyula Germanus, Sir John Glubb, Sir Razik Fareed, Ishtiaq Hussain Qureshi, Ahmet Emin Yalman, Mahmoud Youssef Shawarbi and Nasrollah S. Fatemi.

Colin Wilson stated that "partly through Idries Shah, I have begun to see some rather new and interesting implications [about the subject of mysticism]" and in his review of The Magic Monastery (1972) noted that Shah "is not primarily concerned with propagating some secret doctrine. He is concerned with the method by which mystical knowledge is transmitted... [The Sufis] transmit knowledge through direct intuition rather in the manner of the Zen masters, and one of the chief means of doing this is by means of brief stories and parables which work their way into the subconscious and activate its hidden forces."

In Afghanistan, the Kabul Times said that Caravan of Dreams (1968) was "highly recommended" and "of especial interest to Afghans" because it is "basically an anthology of short stories, tales and proverbs, jokes and extracts, from the written and oral literature which forms a part of many an evening's talk and interchange – even in these modern times – in Afghanistan." The Afghanistan News reported that The Sufis "covers important Afghan contributions to world philosophy and science" and was "the first fully-authoritative book on Sufism and the human development system of the dervishes." As far as doubts about Shah's background and credentials are concerned, the Sardar Haji Faiz Muhammad Khan Zikeria, an Afghan scholar who had served as Afghan Minister of Education and later Ambassador and Foreign Minister of Afghanistan, issued a notarized Declaration for the scholars of the world about the Shah family in 1970: "The Musavi Saiyids of Afghanistan and Khans of Paghman are recognized as the descendants of the Prophet – may peace be upon him. They are recognized to be of the most noble descent of Islam and are respected as Sufi teachers and erudite scholars. Saiyid Idries Shah, son of the late Saiyid Ikbal Ali Shah, is personally known to me as an honourable man whose rank, titles and descent are attested and known by repute."

In 1980, Professor Khalilullah Khalili, former Poet Laureate of Afghanistan, praised the work of his "compatriot and friend the Arif (Sufi Illuminate) The Sayed Idries Shah", saying "Especially to be appreciated are his brilliant and important services in revealing the celestial inspirations and inner thoughts of the great teachers of Islam and Sufis."

The Hindustan Standard of India found that Caravan of Dreams, was a "fine anthology, dippable-into at any time for entertainment, refreshment, consolation, and inspiration... witty, engrossing, utterly and appealingly human."

The Institute for Cross-cultural Exchange (ICE), a Canadian charity founded in 2004, decided to use Idries Shah's children's books to distribute to thousands of needy children in Canada, Mexico and Afghanistan, as part of their children's literacy programme and promotion of cross-cultural understanding. This series of books is published by Hoopoe Books, a non-profit initiative by the American psychologist Robert Ornstein's Institute for the Study of Human Knowledge (ISHK). ISHK provides these books to needy children through their own Share Literacy initiative.

=== "Shah-school" writings ===
A hostile critic was James Moore, a Gurdjieffian who disagreed with Shah's assertion that Gurdjieff's teaching was essentially Sufic in nature and took exception to the publication of a chronologically impossible, pseudonymous book on the matter (The Teachers of Gurdjieff by Rafael Lefort) that was linked to Shah. In a 1986 article in Religion Today (now the Journal of Contemporary Religion), Moore covered the Bennett and Graves controversies and noted that Shah was surrounded by a "nimbus of exorbitant adulation: an adulation he himself has fanned". He described Shah as supported by a "coterie of serviceable journalists, editors, critics, animators, broadcasters, and travel writers, which gamely choruses Shah's praise". Moore questioned Shah's purported Sufi heritage and upbringing and deplored the body of pseudonymous "Shah-school" writings from such authors as "Omar Michael Burke PhD" and "Hadrat B. M. Dervish", who from 1960 heaped intemperate praise – ostensibly from disinterested parties – on Shah, referring to him as the "Tariqa Grand Sheikh Idries Shah Saheb", "Prince Idries Shah", "King Enoch", "The Presence", "The Studious King", the "Incarnation of Ali", and even the Qutb or "Axis" – all in support of Shah's incipient efforts to market Sufism to a Western audience.

Peter Wilson similarly commented on the "very poor quality" of much that had been written in Shah's support, noting an "unfortunately fulsome style", claims that Shah possessed various paranormal abilities, "a tone of superiority; an attitude, sometimes smug, condescending, or pitying, towards those 'on the outside', and the apparent absence of any motivation to substantiate claims which might be thought to merit such treatment". In his view, there was a "marked difference in quality between Shah's own writings" and the quality of this secondary literature. Both Moore and Wilson, however, also noted similarities in style, and considered the possibility that much of this pseudonymous work, frequently published by Octagon Press, Shah's own publishing house, might have been written by Shah himself.

Arguing for an alternative interpretation of this literature, the religious scholar Andrew Rawlinson proposed that rather than a "transparently self-serving [...] deception", it may have been a "masquerade – something that by definition has to be seen through". Stating that "a critique of entrenched positions cannot itself be fixed and doctrinal", and noting that Shah's intent had always been to undermine false certainties, he argued that the "Shah myth" created by these writings may have been a teaching tool, rather than a tool of concealment; something "made to be deconstructed – that is supposed to dissolve when you touch it". Rawlinson concluded that Shah "cannot be taken at face value. His own axioms preclude the very possibility."

=== Assessment ===
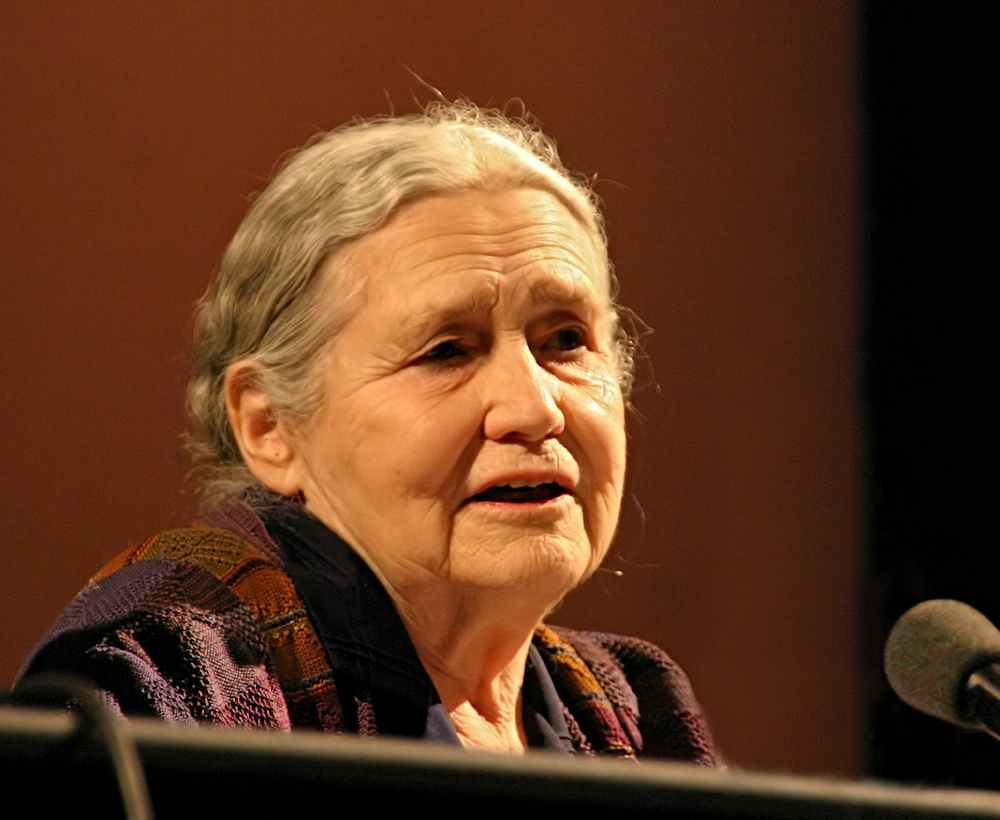
Nobel-prize winner Doris Lessing was profoundly influenced by Shah.

Doris Lessing, one of Shah's greatest defenders, stated in a 1981 interview: "I found Sufism as taught by Idries Shah, which claims to be the reintroduction of an ancient teaching, suitable for this time and this place. It is not some regurgitated stuff from the East or watered-down Islam or anything like that." In 1996, commenting on Shah's death in The Daily Telegraph, she stated that she met Shah because of The Sufis, which was to her the most surprising book she had read, and a book that changed her life. Describing Shah's œuvre as a "phenomenon like nothing else in our time", she characterised him as a many-sided man, the wittiest person she ever expected to meet, kind, generous, modest ("Don't look so much at my face, but take what is in my hand", she quotes him as saying), and her good friend and teacher for 30-odd years.

Arthur J. Deikman, a professor of psychiatry and long-time researcher in the area of meditation and change of consciousness who began his study of Sufi teaching stories in the early seventies, expressed the view that Western psychotherapists could benefit from the perspective provided by Sufism and its universal essence, provided suitable materials were studied in the correct manner and sequence. Given that Shah's writings and translations of Sufi teaching stories were designed with that purpose in mind, he recommended them to those interested in assessing the matter for themselves, and noted that many authorities had accepted Shah's position as a spokesman for contemporary Sufism. The psychologist and consciousness researcher Charles Tart commented that Shah's writings had "produced a more profound appreciation in [him] of what psychology is about than anything else ever written".

Asked to give an assessment of Shah in 1973, J.G. Bennett said that Shah was doing important work on a large scale, "stirring people up very effectively all over the place, making them think, showing them that modes of thought that appear to be free are really largely conditioned." He referred to Shah as the Krishnamurti of Sufism, breaking down people's fixed ideas in many directions as part of an awakening process that is "a very necessary preparation for the new world."

The Indian philosopher and mystic Rajneesh, later known as Osho, commenting on Shah's work, described The Sufis as "just a diamond. The value of what he has done in The Sufis is immeasurable". He added that Shah was "the man who introduced Mulla Nasrudin to the West, and he has done an incredible service. He cannot be repaid. [...] Idries Shah has made just the small anecdotes of Nasrudin even more beautiful ... [he] not only has the capacity to exactly translate the parables, but even to beautify them, to make them more poignant, sharper."

Richard Smoley and Jay Kinney, writing in Hidden Wisdom: A Guide to the Western Inner Traditions (2006), pronounced Shah's The Sufis an "extremely readable and wide-ranging introduction to Sufism", adding that "Shah's own slant is evident throughout, and some historical assertions are debatable (none are footnoted), but no other book is as successful as this one in provoking interest in Sufism for the general reader." They described Learning How to Learn, a collection of interviews, talks and short writings, as one of Shah's best works, providing a solid orientation to his "psychological" approach to Sufi work, noting that at his best, "Shah provides insights that inoculate students against much of the nonsense in the spiritual marketplace."

Ivan Tyrrell and social psychologist Joe Griffin, in their book about innate emotional needs, Human Givens: A new approach to emotional health and clear thinking, wrote that Shah "more than anyone else, understood and appreciated the real significance of the givens of human nature". In another book, Godhead: The Brain's Big Bang – The explosive origin of creativity, mysticism and mental illness, they said that Shah's stories, "when told to young and old alike [...] lay down blueprints in the mind, not only for living and overcoming everyday difficulties but also for travelling the spiritual path. Their impact may not be recognized or felt for months or years after first hearing or reading them, but eventually the structural content they contain will exploit the pattern-matching nature of the brain and make it possible for students to observe the functioning of their own emotionally conditioned responses to changing life circumstances. It then makes it easier for them to take any action required by reality, and for their minds to connect to higher realms. Teaching stories should be read, told and reflected on, but not intellectually analysed, because that destroys the beneficial impact that they would otherwise have had on your mind." Shah, they added, was "a great collector and publisher of tales and writings that contain this 'long-term impact' quality. He understood the vital importance for humanity of the 'mental blueprint' aspect of them and his books are full of nourishing examples."

Olav Hammer notes that during Shah's last years, when the generosity of admirers had made him truly wealthy, and he had become a respected figure among the higher echelons of British society, controversies arose due to discrepancies between autobiographical data – mentioning kinship with the prophet Muhammad, affiliations with a secret Sufi order in Central Asia, or the tradition in which Gurdjieff was taught – and recoverable historical facts. While there may have been a link of kinship with the prophet Muhammad, the number of people sharing such a link today, 1300 years later, would be at least one million. Other elements of Shah's autobiography appeared to have been pure fiction. Even so, Hammer noted that Shah's books have remained in public demand, and that he has played "a significant role in representing the essence of Sufism as a non-confessional, individualistic and life-affirming distillation of spiritual wisdom."

Peter Wilson wrote that if Shah had been a swindler, he had been an "extremely gifted one", because unlike merely commercial writers, he had taken the time to produce an elaborate and internally consistent system that attracted a "whole range of more or less eminent people", and had "provoked and stimulated thought in many diverse quarters". Moore acknowledged that Shah had made a contribution of sorts in popularising a humanistic Sufism, and had "brought energy and resource to his self-aggrandisement", but ended with the damning conclusion that Shah's was "a 'Sufism' without self-sacrifice, without self-transcendence, without the aspiration of gnosis, without tradition, without the Prophet, without the Qur'an, without Islam, and without God. Merely that."

Gore Vidal opined that Shah's "books are a great deal harder to read than they were to write."

==== The Sufis reception ====
The reception of Shah's body of work was also marked by controversy. Some orientalists were hostile, in part because Shah presented classical Sufi writings as tools for self-development to be used by contemporary people, rather than as objects of historical study. The internationally renowned German orientalist Annemarie Schimmel commented that The Sufis, along with Shah's other books, "should be avoided by serious students".

Graves' introduction to The Sufis, written with Shah's help, described Shah as being "in the senior male line of descent from the prophet Mohammed" and as having inherited "secret mysteries from the Caliphs, his ancestors. He is, in fact, a Grand Sheikh of the Sufi Tariqa... " Privately, however, writing to a friend, Graves confessed that this was "misleading: he is one of us, not a Moslem personage." The introduction is not included in Octagon Press editions of the book after 1983 but has always been included in the Anchor/Doubleday editions.

Shah's fiercest critic, University of Edinburgh scholar L.P. Elwell-Sutton, published in 1975 an article critical of what he called "pseudo-Sufis" like Gurdjieff and Shah. He opined that Graves had been trying to "upgrade" Shah's "rather undistinguished lineage", and that the reference to Mohammed's senior male line of descent was a "rather unfortunate gaffe", as Mohammed's sons had all died in infancy. Elwell-Sutton accepted that the family were Sayyids descended from the seventh Imam Musa al-Kazim, the great-great-grandson of Husayn ibn Ali, who was the younger son of the marriage of Fatima (the daughter of the Prophet) and Ali. However, he considered this an "undistinguished lineage" with no special sanctity because "Sayyids proliferate throughout the Islamic world, in all walks of society and on both sides of every religious and political fence." He described Shah's books as "trivial", replete with errors of fact, slovenly and inaccurate translations and even misspellings of Oriental names and words – "a muddle of platitudes, irrelevancies and plain mumbo-jumbo", adding for good measure that Shah had "a remarkable opinion of his own importance". He took a dim view of Rushbrook Williams' festschrift (collection written in honour) of Shah, saying he considered many of the claims made in the book on behalf of Shah and his father, concerning their representing the Sufi tradition, to be self-serving publicity marked by a "disarming disregard for facts". Expressing amusement and amazement at the "sycophantic manner" of Shah's interlocutors in a BBC radio interview, Elwell-Sutton concluded that some Western intellectuals were "so desperate to find answers to the questions that baffle them, that, confronted with wisdom from 'the mysterious East,' they abandon their critical faculties and submit to brainwashing of the crudest kind". To Elwell-Sutton, Shah's Sufism belonged to the realm of "Pseudo-Sufism", "centred not on God but on man."

==== Omar Khayyam affair ====
In the late 1960s and early 1970s, Shah came under attack over a controversy surrounding the 1967 publication of a new translation of Omar Khayyam's Rubaiyat, by Robert Graves and Shah's older brother, Omar Ali-Shah. The translation, which presented the Rubaiyat as a Sufi poem, was based on an annotated "crib", supposedly derived from a manuscript that had been in the Shah family's possession for 800 years. L. P. Elwell-Sutton, an orientalist at Edinburgh University, and others who reviewed the book expressed their conviction that the story of the ancient manuscript was false.

Shah's father, the Sirdar Ikbal Ali Shah, was expected by Graves to present the original manuscript to clear the matter up, but he died in a car accident in Tangier in November 1969. A year later, Graves asked Idries Shah to produce the manuscript. Shah replied in a letter that the manuscript was not in his possession, but even if it were, producing it would prove nothing, because it could not be accurately dated using the current methods and its authenticity would still be contested. It was time, Shah wrote, "that we realised that the hyenas who are making so much noise are intent only on opposition, destructiveness and carrying on a campaign when, let's face it, nobody is really listening." He added that his father had been so infuriated by those casting these aspersions that he refused to engage with them, and he felt his father's response had been correct. Graves, noting that he was now widely perceived as having fallen prey to the Shah brothers' gross deception, and that this affected income from sales of his other historical writings, insisted that producing the manuscript had become "a matter of family honour". He pressed Shah again, reminding him of previous promises to produce the manuscript if it were necessary.

Neither of the brothers ever produced the manuscript, leading Graves' nephew and biographer to muse that it was hard to believe – bearing in mind the Shah brothers' many obligations to Graves – that they would have withheld the manuscript if it had ever existed in the first place. According to his widow writing many years later, Graves had "complete faith" in the authenticity of the manuscript because of his friendship with Shah, even though he never had a chance to view the text in person. The scholarly consensus today is that the "Jan-Fishan Khan" manuscript was a hoax, and that the Graves/Ali-Shah translation was in fact based on a Victorian amateur scholar's analysis of the sources used by previous Rubaiyat translator Edward FitzGerald.

== Works ==
=== Studies in minority beliefs ===
- Oriental Magic ISBN 9781784790424 (1956)
- The Secret Lore of Magic ISBN 9781784790660 (1957)

=== Sufism ===
- The Sufis ISBN 9781784790004 (1964)
- Tales of the Dervishes ISBN 9781784790691 (1967)
- Caravan of Dreams ISBN 9781784790127 (1968)
- Reflections ISBN 9781784790189 (1968)
- The Way of the Sufi ISBN 9781784790240 (1968)
- The Book of the Book ISBN 9781784790783 (1969)
- Wisdom of the Idiots ISBN 9781784790363 (1969)
- The Dermis Probe ISBN 9781784790486 (1970)
- Thinkers of the East: Studies in Experientialism ISBN 9781784790608 (1971)
- The Magic Monastery ISBN 0-86304-058-6 (1972)
- The Elephant in the Dark – Christianity, Islam and the Sufis ISBN 9781784791025 (1974)
- A Veiled Gazelle – Seeing How to See ISBN 0-900860-58-8 (1977)
- Neglected Aspects of Sufi Study ISBN 0-900860-56-1 (1977)
- Special Illumination: The Sufi Use of Humour ISBN 0-900860-57-X (1977)
- A Perfumed Scorpion ISBN 0-900860-62-6 (1978)
- Learning How to Learn ISBN 0-900860-59-6 (1978)
- The Hundred Tales of Wisdom ISBN 0-86304-049-7 (1978)
- Evenings with Idries Shah ISBN 0-86304-008-X (1981)
- Letters and Lectures of Idries Shah ISBN 0-86304-010-1 (1981)
- Observations ISBN 0-86304-013-6 (1982)
- Seeker After Truth ISBN 0-900860-91-X (1982)
- Sufi Thought and Action ISBN 0-86304-051-9 (1990)
- The Commanding Self ISBN 0-86304-066-7 (1994)
- Knowing How to Know ISBN 0-86304-072-1 (1998)

==== Collections of Mulla Nasrudin stories ====
- The Exploits of the Incomparable Mulla Nasrudin ISBN 0-86304-022-5 (1966)
- The Pleasantries of the Incredible Mulla Nasrudin ISBN 0-86304-023-3 (1968)
- The Subtleties of the Inimitable Mulla Nasrudin ISBN 0-86304-021-7 (1973)
- The World of Nasrudin ISBN 0-86304-086-1 (2003)

=== Studies of the English ===
- Darkest England ISBN 0-86304-039-X (1987)
- The Natives are Restless ISBN 0-86304-044-6 (1988)
- The Englishman's Handbook ISBN 0-86304-077-2 (2000)

=== Travel ===
- Destination Mecca ISBN 0-900860-03-0 (1957)

=== Fiction ===
- Kara Kush, London: William Collins Sons and Co., Ltd. ISBN 0-685-55787-1 (1986)

=== Folklore ===
- World Tales ISBN 0-86304-036-5 (1979)

=== For children ===
- Neem the Half-Boy ISBN 1-883536-10-3 (1998)
- The Farmer's Wife ISBN 1-883536-07-3 (1998)
- The Lion Who Saw Himself in the Water ISBN 1-883536-25-1 (1998)
- The Boy Without A Name ISBN 1-883536-20-0 (2000)
- The Clever Boy and the Terrible Dangerous Animal ISBN 1-883536-51-0 (2000)
- The Magic Horse ISBN 1-883536-26-X (2001)
- The Man with Bad Manners ISBN 1-883536-30-8 (2003)
- The Old Woman and The Eagle ISBN 1-883536-27-8 (2005)
- The Silly Chicken ISBN 1-883536-50-2 (2005)
- Fatima the Spinner and the Tent ISBN 1-883536-42-1 (2006)
- The Man and the Fox ISBN 1-883536-43-X (2006)
- The Onion ISBN 978-1-78479-305-0 (2018)
- Speak First and Lose ISBN 978-1-78479-241-1 (2018)
- The Ants and the Pen ISBN 978-1-78479-309-8 (2018)
- The Horrible Dib Dib ISBN 978-1-78479-341-8 (2019)
- After a Swim ISBN 978-1-78479-342-5 (2019)
- The Tale of the Sands ISBN 978-1-78479-340-1 (2019)

=== As Arkon Daraul ===
- A History of Secret Societies ISBN 0-8065-0857-4 (1961)
- Witches and Sorcerers ISBN 0-8065-0267-3 (1962)

=== As Omar Michael Burke ===
- Among the Dervishes (Octagon Press, 1973).

=== Audio interviews, seminars and lectures ===
- Shah, Idries, and Pat Williams. A Framework for New Knowledge. London: Seminar Cassettes, 1973. Sound recording.
- Shah, Idries. Questions and Answers. London: Seminar Cassettes, 1973. Sound recording.
- King, Alexander, Idries Shah, and Aurelio Peccei. The World-and Men. Seminar Cassettes, 1972. Sound recording.
- King, Alexander, et al. Technology: The Two-Edged Sword. London: Seminar Cassettes, 1972. Sound recording.
- Learning From Stories (1976 Lecture) ISBN 1-883536-03-0 (1997)
- On the Nature of Sufi Knowledge (1976 Lecture) ISBN 1-883536-04-9 (1997)
- An Advanced Psychology of the East (1977 Lecture) ISBN 1-883536-02-2 (1997)
- Overcoming Assumptions that Inhibit Spiritual Development; previously entitled A Psychology of the East (1976 Lecture) ISBN 1-883536-23-5 (2000)

=== Centenary ===
Materials to mark the centenary of Shah's birth, 16 June 2024.

- Tahir Shah (Ed), Idries Shah Centenary (8 volumes), (2024).

== See also ==
- The Institute for Cultural Research (1965–2013)
- The Idries Shah Foundation (2013 onwards)

== Bibliography ==
- Archer, Nathaniel P. (1977). Idries Shah, Printed Word International Collection 8. London, UK: Octagon Press. ISBN 0-86304-000-4.
- Bennett, John G. (1975). Witness: The autobiography of John G. Bennett. Turnstone Books. ISBN 0-85500-043-0.
- Boorstein, S. (1996). Boorstein, Seymour (ed.). "Transpersonal Psychotherapy". American Journal of Psychotherapy. 54 (3). Albany, NY: State University of New York Press: 408–423. doi:10.1176/appi.psychotherapy.2000.54.3.408. ISBN 0-7914-2835-4. PMID 11008637.
- Galin, Müge (1997). Between East and West: Sufism in the Novels of Doris Lessing. Albany, NY: State University of New York Press. ISBN 0-7914-3383-8.
- Ghali, Halima (1979). Shah, International Press Review Collection 9. London, UK: BM Sufi Studies.
- Graves, Richard Perceval (1995). Robert Graves and The White Goddess: 1940–1985. London, UK: Weidenfeld & Nicolson. ISBN 0-297-81534-2.
- Lewin, Leonard; Shah, Idries (1972). The Diffusion of Sufi Ideas in the West. Boulder, CO: Keysign Press.
- Malik, Jamal; Hinnells, John R., eds. (2006). Sufism in the West. London, UK/New York, NY: Routledge Taylor & Francis Group. ISBN 0-415-27407-9.
- Moore, James (1986). "Neo-Sufism: The Case of Idries Shah". Religion Today. 3 (3): 4–8. doi:10.1080/13537908608580605.
- O'Prey, Paul (1984). Between Moon and Moon – Selected Letters of Robert Graves 1946–1972. Hutchinson. ISBN 0-09-155750-X.
- Rawlinson, Andrew (1997). The Book of Enlightened Masters: Western Teachers in Eastern Traditions. Chicago and La Salle, IL: Open Court. ISBN 0-8126-9310-8.
- Smith, Jane I. (1999). Islam in America (Columbia Contemporary American Religion Series). New York, NY/Chichester, UK: Columbia University Press. ISBN 0-231-10966-0.
- Smoley, Richard; Kinney, Jay (2006). Hidden Wisdom: A Guide to the Western Inner Traditions. Wheaton, IL/Chennai, India: Quest Books. ISBN 0-8356-0844-1.
- Taji-Farouki, Suha; Nafi, Basheer M., eds. (2004). Islamic Thought in the Twentieth Century. London, UK/New York, NY: I.B.Tauris Publishers. ISBN 1-85043-751-3.
- Westerlund, David, ed. (2004). Sufism in Europe and North America. New York, NY: RoutledgeCurzon. ISBN 0-415-32591-9.
- Wilson, Peter (1998). "The Strange Fate of Sufism in the New Age". In Peter B. Clarke (ed.). New Trends and Developments in the World of Islam. London: Luzac Oriental. ISBN 1-898942-17-X.
- Wintle, Justin, ed. (2001). Makers of Modern Culture, Vol. 1. London, UK/New York, NY: Routledge. ISBN 0-415-26583-5.
