= A Perfumed Scorpion =

1978 non-fiction book by Idries Shah

- Author: Idries Shah
- Language: English
- Genre: Eastern philosophy and culture
- Publication date: 1978
- Publication place: United Kingdom
- Media type: Print (Hardback & Paperback)
- ISBN: 0-86304-080-2
- OCLC: 45444277

A Perfumed Scorpion is a non-fiction book by the Sufist writer, Idries Shah, that was first published by Octagon Press in 1978, the same year that he published two other major works: Learning How to Learn: Psychology and Spirituality in the Sufi Way and The Hundred Tales of Wisdom. It has since been republished by The Idries Shah Foundation.

Shortly before he died, Shah stated that his books form a complete course that could fulfill the function he had fulfilled while alive. As such, A Perfumed Scorpion can be read as part of a whole course of study.

== Summary ==
The book contains the substance of lectures given by the author at various universities in the United States under the aegis of the Institute for the Study of Human Knowledge and the Graduate Institute of International Studies, Fairleigh Dickinson University. The "perfuming of a scorpion" is a reference to a symbol used by Bahaudin Naqshband of Bukhara when he taught about the ubiquitous problem of hypocrisy and self-deception in both individuals and institutions: "Whoever might perfume a scorpion will not thereby escape its sting".

The seven sections of the book deal in depth with this issue under headings such as Education, The Nature of Sufi Knowledge, The Path and the Duties and the Techniques, Teaching Stories, A framework for New Knowledge and Involvement in Sufi Study. Each section contains numerous illustrative anecdotes from contemporary life but is nevertheless rooted in the teaching patterns of Rumi, Hafiz, Jami, and other great Oriental sages who dealt with the need for, and the path to, knowledge and information before real progress can be made.

== Reception ==
A Perfumed Scorpion was described by one reviewer as "... an invigorating and abrasive book, like jumping into icy water - hard to do, but you're glad you have done it." This reviewer also appreciated the way it dissolves in the attentive reader “the maiming effect of unconscious bias.” The influence of the book continues and it has remained in print ever since it was published.

Philosopher of science and physicist Henri Bortoft used teaching tales from Shah's corpus as analogies of the habits of mind which prevented people from grasping the scientific method of Johann Wolfgang von Goethe. Bortoft's The Wholeness of Nature: Goethe's Way of Science includes stories from Tales of the Dervishes, The Exploits of the Incomparable Mulla Nasrudin and A Perfumed Scorpion.

== See also ==
- Eleven Naqshbandi principles
