= The Book of the Book =

Book by Idries Shah

- First edition
- Author: Idries Shah
- Language: English
- Subject: Sufism
- Published: 1969
- Publisher: Octagon Press
- Publication place: United Kingdom
- Media type: Print (Paperback & eBook).
- Pages: 278
- ISBN: 9781784790783
- OCLC: 16228770
- Preceded by: The Pleasantries of the Incredible Mulla Nasrudin
- Followed by: Wisdom of the Idiots

The Book of the Book is a book by Idries Shah. The majority of the book's 200 pages are blank, with the remaining nine pages telling the story of a book left by a wise man consisting of one sentence and attempts over hundreds of years to discern the intended meaning.

== Critical reception ==
Lawrence Paul Elwell-Sutton writing for The New York Review of Books said, "I suppose his admirers among the Hampstead intelligentsia will have swallowed this buffoonery with the same enthusiasm with which they have gulped down the rest."

Doris Lessing responded to Elwell-Sutton's remarks, in the New York Review of Books, stating "Ignorance, I will admit, is no crime, and I am sure that Dr. Elwell-Sutton does not claim to be a literary man. But motivation has its mysteries."

A review in Studies in Comparative Religion stated "The Book of the Book, which purports to be an object lesson in the problem of the container and the content, consists of some fifteen pages of print bound together with over 250 blank pages".
