= Neem the Half-Boy =

Book by Idries Shah

Neem the Half Boy
- Book cover of Neem the Half Boy by Idries Shah
- Author: Idries Shah
- Illustrator: Midori Mori & Robert Revels
- Language: English
- Genre: Children
- Published: September 1998
- Publisher: Hoopoe Books
- Publication date: 1998-2016
- Publication place: United States of America
- Media type: Print (Paperback & Hardcover).
- Pages: 32
- ISBN: 9781883536107
- Preceded by: Knowing How to Know
- Followed by: The Farmer's Wife

Neem the Half Boy, first published in 1998, is the first of eleven children's books written by Idries Shah and published by Hoopoe Books.

== Summary ==
Neem the Half Boy is a fable about a queen who longs for a son. She asks the fairies for help and they consult a wise man, who gives certain instructions. Because the queen follows the instructions only halfway, she gives birth to a half-boy, whom she names Neem. To help Neem become whole, the fairies again consult the wise man, who says that Neem must obtain a special medicine from a dragon’s cave. Neem overcomes his fears and obtains the medicine by making a bargain with the dragon that, besides helping himself, also helps the dragon and the people it has been frightening.

== Editions ==
Neem the Half Boy comes in several different versions: hardcover, softcover, and hardcover with a CD. The book is published in several different languages including English and Spanish as well as several bilingual editions including English and Pashto and English and Dari.

== Reception ==
Hazel Rochman reviewed Neem the Half Boy and the "Lion Who Saw Himself in the Water" for the October 1998 issue of Booklist. Rochman said that "The brightly colored, cheerful illustrations of both books express their upbeat peaceful messages."

In 2003, Noorullah Babrakzai reviewed Shah's entire Children's Book Series which includes "Neem the Half Boy" for Multicultural Perspectives. Babrakzai notes that "it would be a mistake to view these tales as merely 'primitive' substitutes for more 'sophisticated' forms of entertainment. There lasting appeal is due, I think, to the fact that they not only entertain, but can be understood on many different levels and provide a form of "nourishment for the brain" that can help develop thinking abilities and perceptions."
