= The Secret Lore of Magic =

1957 book by Idries Shah

- First UK edition
- Author: Idries Shah
- Language: English
- Publisher: Frederick Muller Ltd
- Publication date: 1957
- Publication place: United Kingdom
- Media type: Print (Paperback & eBook)
- Pages: 382
- Preceded by: Oriental Magic
- Followed by: Destination Mecca

The Secret Lore of Magic is a book by Idries Shah on the subject of magical texts. First published in 1957, it includes several major source-books of magical arts, translated from French, Latin, Hebrew and other tongues, annotated and fully illustrated with numerous diagrams, signs and characters. Together with Oriental Magic, which appeared in the preceding year, it provided an important literary-anthropological survey of magical literature and is a comprehensive reference for psychologists, ethnologists and others interested in the rise and development of human beliefs.

In addition to the inherent worth of their content, The Secret Lore of Magic and Oriental Magic can also be seen as a ground-breaking operation by this author, before publishing over the ensuing years his many volumes of Sufi thought, ideas, and materials.

== Content ==
Black magic and maleficium or sorcery have been practised through the ages with the aid of certain jealously guarded writings, such as the Black Books of the Magicians. The Secret Lore of Magic includes the entire text of the four books of the Secrets of Albertus Magnus, the Book of the Spirits, the Almadel, the Book of Power, the Clavicle and the Testament, the Grimoire of Honorius the Great, and the processes of the Black Pact as given by the True Grimoire and the Great Grimoire. Copies of these Grimoires (the "grammars" of sorcery) were extremely rare, and although occult works based on parts of grimoires were continuing to appear, the actual sources had never before been made available for study and comparison.

=== Views ===
Shah points out that all magic essentially outside religious rituals, had been viewed by clerics as nothing less than the Black Art. That attitude shifted during the centuries of research in Arabian Spain, as a result of which magic became officially understood as divided into the twin categories of black and white. The Secret Lore of Magic reflects this division. Its pages contain both the most sublime, complex and important rituals and methods of white magic, (The Key of Solomon), and also what was considered to be the most diabolical work on black magic ever written (The Grimoire of Honorius the Great).

Although the major part of The Secret Lore consists of primary sources, the author’s own informed commentary runs through it, often setting symbols, rituals and practices in a clearer light or wider context. Shah also states that the methods of making spells, charms and talismans, together with the rituals of raising spirits through the Magical Circle, all of which are contained in this work, between them comprise the whole gamut of supernatural power.

== Commentary ==
Commenting on these works, Shah emphasised that neither had relevance to, nor were written for, contemporary devotees of witchcraft and magic.

For too long people believed that there were secret books, hidden places, and amazing things. They held onto this information as something to frighten themselves with. So the first purpose was information. This is the magic of East and West. That's all. There is no more. The second purpose of those books was to show that there do seem to be forces, some of which are either rationalized by this magic or may be developed from it, which do not come within customary physics or within the experience of ordinary people. I think this should be studied; that we should gather the data and analyze the phenomena. We need to separate the chemistry of magic from the alchemy, as it were.

== Reception ==
According to Mundilibro, (Nov-Dec 1974), commenting on Oriental Magic and The Secret Lore of Magic,

These basic works … serve to establish Idries Shah as an original, careful and reliable researcher in the field of human knowledge …”. It also stated that the two books “have not been superseded as links in the history of ideas.” The Book Exchange said that The Secret Lore of Magic was ‘essential reading for research in the fields of human beliefs, practices and ceremonies”.

The Liverpool Post described it as a "mammoth survey, never before attempted in any language."
