= The Commanding Self =

1994 book by Idries Shah

- Author: Idries Shah
- Language: English
- Publisher: Octagon Press
- Publication date: 1994
- Publication place: United Kingdom
- Media type: Print (hardback and paperback)
- ISBN: 0-86304-066-7 (paperback edition)
- OCLC: 784283953

The Commanding Self is a book by the writer Idries Shah first published by Octagon Press in 1994. A paperback edition was published in 1997.

Shortly before he died, Shah stated that his books form a complete course that could fulfil the function he had fulfilled while alive. As such, The Commanding Self can be read as part of a whole course of study.

Shah stated that The Commanding Self was "the key to understanding his entire corpus of work."

== Content ==
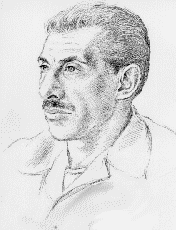
Idries Shah

The Commanding Self builds on the foundations laid in Shah's previous publications, Learning How to Learn – Psychology and Spirituality in the Sufi Way and Knowing How to Know.

"The Commanding Self" (Arabic Nafs-ul-Amara اﻟﻧﻔﺲﻻﻣﺎﺮﺓ) is Sufic terminology for the "mixture of primitive and conditioned responses, common to everyone, which inhibits and distorts human progress and understanding".

The opening pages of the book expand on this definition:

"The Commanding Self ... can be seen as a sort of parasite, which first complements the personality, then takes over certain parts of it, and masquerades as the personality itself." Shah states that there is "no intention of destroying or undermining the Commanding Self". Instead, would-be students are encouraged to "divert vanity from the spiritual arena ... to channel the Commanding Self's activities to any worldly ambition: while continuing to study the Sufi Way in a modest and non-self-promoting manner."

Written in response to requests for "clarification, interviews, question-and-answer sessions, lectures", the following sections of the book present study themes intended to enable the student to observe the functioning of their own emotional and conditioned responses.

== Reception ==
Upon its publication, Nobel prize winner Doris Lessing wrote of The Commanding Self; "What Sufis offer is learning, through experience. But if Sufism is not to be understood by people not involved in the process of becoming Sufis, or working with Sufis, what hope is there for outside enquirers; what use is a book like this one? But this is exactly where The Commanding Self comes in, and other books Idries Shah has been publishing which are part of a "course", if you like, and designed to introduce the interested to this way of looking at life, as well as teaching students. An analogy they use is that a dried peach is not a peach, but may prepare you to recognize fresh peaches when at last you eat one."
