= The Way of the Sufi =

- First edition
- Author: Idries Shah
- Language: English
- Genre: Sufism
- Published: 1968
- Publisher: Jonathan Cape
- Publication place: United Kingdom
- Media type: Print (Paperback & eBook). Audiobook
- Pages: 354
- OCLC: 16228770
- Preceded by: Reflections
- Followed by: The Pleasantries of the Incredible Mulla Nasrudin

The Way of the Sufi was the best-selling follow-up introduction to Sufism by the writer Idries Shah after the publication of his first book on the subject, The Sufis. Whereas The Sufis eschewed academic norms such as footnotes and an index, The Way of the Sufi provided a full section of notes and a bibliography at the end of its first chapter, entitled "The Study of Sufism in the West".

Shortly before he died, Shah stated that his books form a complete course that could fulfil the function he had fulfilled while alive. As such, The Way of the Sufi can be read as part of a whole course of study.

== Summary ==
As in The Sufis, Shah gave potted biographies of some of the best known Sufis of the ages, while adding brief descriptions of four of the major Sufi orders, or Tariqas: the Chisti Order, Qadiri Order, Suhrawardi Order and Naqshbandi Order. In addition there were a number of Sufi teaching stories as well as question-and-answer sessions with Sufi teachers. Continuing a theme from the previous book, Shah argued that Sufism had greatly influenced Western civilisation over the centuries, but that this had largely gone unrecognised, citing examples such as Chaucer, Shakespeare, the William Tell legend, the former United Nations secretary-general Dag Hammarskjoeld and the works of Sir Richard Burton amongst others. In the East, he also said that Sufism had influenced certain aspects of Hinduism as well as Zen Buddhism.

== Reception ==
The book was well received on publication, with the BBC's The Critics programme declaring it an "outstanding book of the year". The New York Times also applauded the book, saying it was "like a door opening where one least expects it". Writing in the British newspaper The Observer, Nobel Prize-winning author Doris Lessing described it as "a key book".
