= The Silly Chicken =

Book by Idries Shah

- Book cover of The Silly Chicken by Idries Shah
- Author: Idries Shah
- Illustrator: Jeff Jackson
- Cover artist: Jeff Jackson
- Language: English
- Genre: Children
- Published: June 2005
- Publisher: Hoopoe Books
- Publication date: 2005-2016
- Publication place: United States of America
- Media type: Print (Paperback & Hardcover).
- Pages: 32
- ISBN: 978-1-883536-19-0
- Preceded by: The Old Woman and the Eagle
- Followed by: Fatima the Spinner and the Tent

The Silly Chicken, first published in 2005, is the ninth of eleven children's books written by Idries Shah and published by Hoopoe Books. The book is appropriate for children from 3 to 11.

== Summary ==
The Silly Chicken is a fable about a chicken who learns to speak as we do. What follows will intrigue young children and, at the same time, warn them about being gullible in a humours fashion.

== Editions ==
The Silly Chicken comes in several different versions: hardcover, softcover, and hardcover with a CD. The book is published in several different languages including English and Spanish as well as several bilingual editions including English and Pashto and English and Dari.

== Reception ==
Dr. Denise Nessel reviewed "The Lion Who Saw Himself in the Water" and "The Silly Chicken" for the November/December 2003 issue of Library Media Connection. Nessel said that "These stories, and others from this tradition, are not moralistic fables or parables, which aim to indoctrinate, nor are they written only to amuse. Rather, they are carefully designed to show effective ways of defining and responding to common life experiences. A story is an especially good means for this kind of communication because it works its way into consciousness in a way that direct instruction cannot do." Dr. Nessel states specifically about the story that "a talking chicken creates anxiety and disorder in a community until people realize that just because a bird can speak, marvelous though that may be, it doesn't mean the bird knows what it's talking about. Like other stories of its kind, this one uses the ancient Eastern technique of attributing common foibles to foolish characters, gently allowing readers to recognize their own gullibility. The story has no heroes or villains and does not address weighty issues, yet it helps children to develop the habit of critical thinking."

Noorullah Babrakzai reviewed Shah's entire Children's Book Series which includes "The Silly Chicken" for Volume 5 Number 2, 2003 (ISSN 1521-0960) issue of the Multicultural Perspectives. Babrakzai is Afghan who grew up hearing these stories notes that they "are vibrant, engaging, universal stories, not arid geography lessons ... ." She notes that "it would be a mistake to view these tales as merely 'primitive' substitutes for more 'sophisticated' forms of entertainment. Their lasting appeal is due, I think, to the fact that they not only entertain, but can be understood on many different levels and provide a form of "nourishment for the brain" that can help develop thinking abilities and perceptions." She concludes that "These enchanting stories Shah has collected have a richness and depth not often encountered in children's literature, and their effect on minds young and old can be almost magical. It is for this reason, as much as for what they can teach us about an important but little-known culture, that they are a most worthy addition to any bookshelf."
