= Tales of the Dervishes =

- First UK edition
- Author: Idries Shah
- Language: English
- Genre: Eastern philosophy and Sufism
- Publisher: Jonathan Cape
- Publication date: 1967
- Publication place: United Kingdom
- Media type: Print (Paperback & eBook).
- Pages: 248
- OCLC: 983317814
- Preceded by: The Exploits of the Incomparable Mulla Nasrudin

Tales of the Dervishes by Idries Shah was first published in 1967, and re-published and made available online for free by The Idries Shah Foundation in October 2016.

== Summary ==
Tales of the Dervishes is a collection of stories, parables, legends and fables gathered from classical Sufi texts and oral sources spanning a period from the 7th to the 20th centuries. An author's postscript to each story offers a brief account of its provenance, use and place in Sufi tradition.

== Reception ==
The Islamic scholar James Kritzeck, reviewing Shah's Tales of the Dervishes in The Nation, said that it was "beautifully translated" and equipped "men and women to make good use of their lives." In an essay on dervish tales he also discusses at length the value of the stories in this book. The Stanford University professor Robert E. Ornstein, writing in Psychology Today, called the book "... a collection of diamonds ... incredibly well-crafted, multifaceted ... likely to endure in the manner of the Koran and the Bible." The Observer noted that the book "... challenges our intellectual assumptions at almost every point." Desmond Morris, in The World of Books (BBC), said that "For every decade we live, we will find another meaning in each story." The Sunday Times called it "An astonishingly generous and liberating book ... strikingly appropriate for our time and situation ... a jewel flung in the market-place."

Psychiatrist and author Arthur Deikman, in his book The Observing Self, uses tales from this work to illustrate the role of intuition in the human makeup and the idea that mysticism is an extension of natural psychological faculties.

Philosopher of science and physicist Henri Bortoft used teaching tales from Shah's corpus as analogies of the habits of mind which prevented people from grasping the scientific method of Johann Wolfgang von Goethe. Bortoft's The Wholeness of Nature: Goethe's Way of Science includes stories from Tales of the Dervishes, The Exploits of the Incomparable Mullah Nasruddin and A Perfumed Scorpion.
