= The Lion Who Saw Himself in the Water =

Book by Idries Shah

- Book cover of The Lion Who Saw Himself in the Water by Idries Shah
- Author: Idries Shah
- Illustrator: Ingrid Rodriguez
- Cover artist: Ingrid Rodriguez
- Language: English
- Genre: Children
- Published: September 1998
- Publisher: Hoopoe Books
- Publication date: 1998-2016
- Publication place: United States of America
- Media type: Print (Paperback & Hardcover).
- Pages: 36
- ISBN: 1883536251
- Preceded by: The Farmer's Wife
- Followed by: The Boy Without a Name

The Lion Who Saw Himself in the Water, first published in 1998, is the third of eleven children's books written by Idries Shah and published by Hoopoe Books. The book is written for children aged from 3 to 11.

== Summary ==
The Lion Who Saw Himself in the Water is a fable about a good natured lion.

== Editions ==
The Lion Who Saw Himself in the Water comes in several different versions: hardcover, softcover, and hardcover with a CD. The book is published in several different language including English and Spanish as well as several bilingual editions including English and Pashto and English and Dari.

== Reception ==
The Michigan Department of Education selected this title as part of their statewide R.E.A.D.Y. (Read, Educate and Develop Youth), program designed to make sure children have the necessary pre-reading skills (language, vocabulary, alphabet) by the time they enter school.

Dr. Denise Nessel reviewed The Lion Who Saw Himself in the Water and The Silly Chicken for the November/December 2003 issue of Library Media Connection. Nessel said that "These stories, and others from this tradition, are not moralistic fables or parables, which aim to indoctrinate, nor are they written only to amuse. Rather, they are carefully designed to show effective ways of defining and responding to common life experiences. A story is an especially good means for this kind of communication because it works its way into consciousness in a way that direct instruction cannot do." Dr. Nessel states specifically about the story that "With each rereading, the lion's predicament and his reaction to it become more familiar. This familiarity provides a base on which the child can come to understand egocentricity and irrationality at successive depths later in life."

In 2003, Noorullah Babrakzai reviewed Shah's entire Children's Book Series which includes The Lion Who Saw Himself in the Water for Multicultural Perspectives. Babrakzai is Afghan who grew up hearing these stories notes that they "are vibrant, engaging, universal stories, not arid geography lessons ... ." She notes about the "Lion" that this tale "can teach children and adults valuable lessons about fear that unfold gradually, as one is ready for them." Babrakzai notes that "it would be a mistake to view these tales as merely 'primitive' substitutes for more 'sophisticated' forms of entertainment. There lasting appeal is due, I think, to the fact that they not only entertain, but can be understood on many different levels and provide a form of "nourishment for the brain" that can help develop thinking abilities and perceptions." She concludes that "These enchanting stories Shah has collected have a richness and depth not often encountered in children's literature, and their effect on minds young and old can be almost magical. It is for this reason, as much as for what they can teach us about an important but little-known culture, that they are a most worthy addition to any bookshelf."
