= The Man with Bad Manners =

2003 children's book by Idries Shah

The Man With Bad Manners
- Book cover of The Man with Bad Manners by Idries Shah
- Author: Idries Shah
- Illustrator: Rose Mary Santiago
- Language: English
- Genre: Children
- Published: November 2003
- Publisher: Hoopoe Books
- Publication date: 2003-2016
- Publication place: United States of America
- Media type: Print (Paperback & Hardcover).
- Pages: 24
- ISBN: 9781883536305
- Preceded by: The Magic Horse
- Followed by: The Old Woman and the Eagle

The Man With Bad Manners, first published in 2003, is the seventh out of eleven children's books written by Idries Shah and published by Hoopoe Books.

== Summary ==
The Man With Bad Manners is a fable about how a village struggles with a Man with Bad Manners. The story's focus is on peaceful conflict resolution and how the village provides the Man with Bad Manners an opportunity to reform his behavior. The publisher has developed a "Manual for Parents and Caregivers," which is available for free at their website. The manual suggests questions that a parent might ask to enrich a child's understanding of the story's message.

== Editions ==
The Man With Bad Manners comes in several different versions: hardcover, softcover, and hardcover with a CD. The book is published in several different language including English and Spanish as well as several bilingual editions including English and Pashto and English and Dari.

== Reception ==
Marilyn Taniguchi of the Beverly Hills Public Library reviewed The Man With Bad Manners for the April 2004 issue of the School Library Journal. Taniguchi said that the story and illustrations blend effectively to deliver "the story's message of peaceful conflict resolution."

Veronica Schwartz of the Des Plaines Public Library reviewed The Man With Bad Manners for the May 2006 issue of the School Library Journal. Schwartz notes that she considers the book "A fine addition to folk tale collections." Schwartz goes on to say that the story covers "lessons relating to conflict resolution, initiative, cooperation, and an alternative way of seeing things."

Noorullah Babrakzai reviewed Shah's entire Children's Book Series which includes "The Man With Bad Manners" for Volume 5 Number 2, 2003 (ISSN 1521-0960) issue of the Multicultural Perspectives. Babrakzai notes that "it would be a mistake to view these tales as merely 'primitive' substitutes for more 'sophisticated' forms of entertainment. There lasting appeal is due, I think, to the fact that they not only entertain, but can be understood on many different levels and provide a form of "nourishment for the brain" that can help develop thinking abilities and perceptions."
