= Seeker After Truth =

1982 book by Idries Shah

Seeker After Truth: A Handbook
- Author: Idries Shah
- Language: English
- Genre: Sufism, Religion, Psychology, Philosophy
- Publisher: Octagon Press
- Publication date: 1982
- Publication place: United Kingdom
- Media type: Print (Hardback & Paperback). eBook and audiobook
- ISBN: 9780900860911
- OCLC: 8968959

Seeker After Truth: A Handbook was written by Idries Shah, one of the foremost writers on Sufism. It was first published by Octagon Press in 1982, and later republished by The Idries Shah Foundation.

Shortly before he died, Shah stated that his books form a complete course that could fulfil the function he had fulfilled while alive. As such, Seeker After Truth can be read as part of a whole course of study.

== Content ==
The book is constructed from a mix of classical teaching tales, letters, question and answer sessions, anecdotes and discussions from dinner meetings. As such it is part of the large corpus of material that Idries Shah disseminated over a 40-year period specifically for people who wished to absorb Sufi patterns of thought and behaviour in the way that he suggested was appropriate and effective for modern times. He described the process in this book in answer to the question, "What is the reason for the way in which your materials are projected in print? I mean, why do you translate some material, represent other portions, use Eastern similes in some and Western psychological terminology and insights in others?"

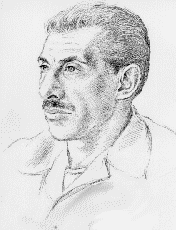
Idries Shah

He replied, "There are two criteria:

(1) What materials have to be projected at the present time to have the maximum useful effect, and

(2) Who can absorb them and in what format?

"Sufic materials are always presented in accordance with the possibilities. This is because Sufism is not archaeology or hagiography (however much it may resemble them to those who look no further) but effect. Eastern similes that are still viable both in the East and West are used because of this viability. Superseded materials are not regurgitated just because they have been used in former times. Materials are re-presented if this can be usefully done. 'Western' psychological terminology and insights are useful, so they are used.

"Look at the results. The published materials are read and accepted in both the East and West; by scientists as well as theologians, by ordinary readers in addition to specialists of all kinds. In a word, the presentation is effective.

"If there were no originating impulse from which the material comes and which indicates how it may be used, we would be forced to present Sufi materials like you would any other dead corpus of lore: you would rearrange, prune and present in accordance with subjective assessments. We do not have to do this, since the material itself provides the guidance to those who can descry it. The question, however, illustrates the mind of the questioner more than anything else; for it presupposes that Sufi materials are like those of any other pursuit, capable of being manipulated by rule or whim. Had the questioner taken into consideration the Sufi fact that the Teaching determines its method of presentation, he would not have needed to ask the question."

== Reception ==
The Literary Review wrote that Seeker After Truth was, "food for many different kinds of study - a book unlike anything our own society has produced until recently, in its richness, its unexpectedness, its capacity to shock us into seeing ourselves as others see us, both personally and as a society."

Robert Ornstein and Paul Ehrlich, in their book New World New Mind, recommend Seeker After Truth and other books by Idries Shah "... for the beginnings of a short course on changing your mind."
