= Neglected Aspects of Sufi Study =

1977 book by Idries Shah

- Author: Idries Shah
- Language: English
- Publisher: Octagon Press Ltd
- Publication date: 1977
- Publication place: United Kingdom
- Media type: Print (Hardback
- ISBN: 0-86304-078-0 (hardback edition)
- OCLC: 50088986

Neglected Aspects of Sufi Study is a book by the writer Idries Shah, published by Octagon Press in 1977. A later edition was published in 2002.

Shortly before he died, Shah stated that his books form a complete course that could fulfil the function he had fulfilled while alive. As such, Neglected Aspects of Sufi Study can be read as part of a whole course of study.

== Content ==
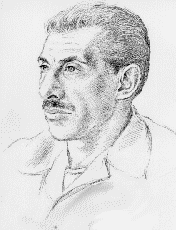
Idries Shah

Based on university lectures at the New School for Social Research (New York), as well as the University of California (San Francisco), Neglected Aspects of Sufi Study deals with many of the problems of Sufic methods of study and those which militate against its effective progress in the modern world; notably the unrecognised assumptions which we make about ourselves, and about learning and its process.

== Reception ==
Neglected Aspects of Sufi Study was favourably received, the Books and Bookmen review commented that; "It elaborates points found difficult in our culture because of sets of mind." Asian Affairs wrote that it "contains serious warnings about the dangers of facile cult-formation", while the Psychology Today review described the book as "an extraordinarily effective learning tool."
