= The Sufis =

1964 book on Sufism by Idries Shah

- First edition (US)
- Author: Idries Shah
- Language: English
- Publisher: Doubleday
- Publication date: 1964
- Publication place: United Kingdom
- Media type: Print (Paperback & eBook). Audiobook
- OCLC: 222708997
- Preceded by: Destination Mecca
- Followed by: The Way of the Sufi

The Sufis is one of the best known books on Sufism by the writer Idries Shah. First published in 1964 with an introduction by Robert Graves, it introduced Sufi ideas to the West in a format acceptable to non-specialists at a time when the study of Sufism had largely become the reserve of Orientalists.

Shortly before he died, Shah stated that his books form a complete course that could fulfil the function he had fulfilled while alive. As such, The Sufis can be read as part of a whole course of study.

== Summary ==
Eschewing a purely academic approach, Shah gave an overview of Sufi concepts, with potted biographies of some of the most important Sufis over the ages, including Rumi and Ibn al-Arabi, while simultaneously presenting the reader with Sufi teaching materials, such as traditional stories or the jokes from the Mulla Nasrudin corpus. The book also gave details of previously unsuspected Sufic influences on Western culture. According to Shah, the Freemasons, Miguel de Cervantes, Western chivalry, alchemy and Saint Francis of Assisi, amongst others, were all influenced directly or indirectly by Sufis and Sufi ideas, often as a result of contact between East and West in the Middle Ages in places such as Spain or Sicily.

== Reception ==
The book had a powerful impact on many thinkers and artists when it appeared, including the Nobel Prize winning author Doris Lessing, the poet Ted Hughes, and the writers Geoffrey Grigson and J. D. Salinger. Doris Lessing described it as "the best introduction to the body of Shah's work", adding that by reading it one was "forced to use one's mind in a new way". She went on to call it "a seminal book of the century, even a watershed."

Richard Smoley and Jay Kinney, writing in Hidden Wisdom: A Guide to the Western Inner Traditions (2006), pronounced The Sufis an "extremely readable and wide-ranging introduction to Sufism", adding that "Shah's own slant is evident throughout, and some historical assertions are debatable (none are footnoted), but no other book is as successful as this one in provoking interest in Sufism for the general reader."

Richard C. Munn, reviewing the book in the Journal of the American Oriental Society, concluded that "One cannot approach this book either in the role of scholar or in the role of seeker (nut), for the author has cleverly blocked both these 'postural' approaches, much in the same way, one suspects, as a Sufi shaikh would. If the Sufi essence is untranslatable into book form, it naturally remains so, but Idries Shah, by 'playing' with the reader, and 'scattering' his points of information, has perhaps given the reader an inkling of Sufi 'experience'."

German orientalist Annemarie Schimmel commented that The Sufis, along with Shah's other books, "should be avoided by serious students".

== Fiftieth anniversary (1964–2014) ==
2014 marked the fiftieth anniversary of the publication of The Sufis. New paperback and ebook editions of the work were published that year by the newly-formed ISF Publishing, in association with The Idries Shah Foundation, to coincide with that event.

Part of a wider initiative, The Idries Shah Foundation had begun to make available new paperback and ebook editions of Shah's many books in English, along with translations into other Western languages, and also into Arabic, Persian, Urdu and Turkish.

In an article on the Al Jazeera web site, John Bell and John Zada write about the wave of intolerant militance and extremism in the East and in Africa and about the destruction of many cultural resources such as libraries and UNESCO World Heritage shrines and mosques in places like Timbuktu.

Explaining the historical, rich and diverse background of the tolerant Sufi tradition, the authors suggest that the material in Shah's book provides a useful and most-timely counterpoint and antidote to such extremism in the East; to consumerism in the West; and to intolerance, dogmatism and closed thinking, which they and Shah see as material, mental and emotional "prisons".

In an article in The Guardian, Jason Webster is also of the opinion that the Sufi Way, as it is known, is a natural antidote to fanaticism.

Webster states that classical Islamic Sufis include (amongst many others) the poet and Persian polymath Omar Khayyám, the Andalusian polymath Avërroes, the Persian poet and hagiographer Fariduddin Attar, and the Persian poet and theologian Jalāl ad-Dīn Rumi. The reviewer also notes that when The Sufis first appeared, The Washington Post declared the book "a seminal book of the century", and that the work attracted writers such as Doris Lessing, J. D. Salinger and Geoffrey Grigson. The poet Ted Hughes also described it as "astonishing" and wrote that "The Sufis must be the biggest society of sensible men on Earth." According to the reviewer, others in the West drawn to or influenced by Sufism include St Francis of Assisi, the novelist, poet and playwright Miguel de Cervantes, the poet and diplomat Sir Richard Burton, the leading British politician Winston Churchill, and the diplomat and economist Dag Hammarskjöld.

== Reviews ==
- Munn, Richard C. (1969). Reviewed work(s): The Sufis by Idries Shah, Journal of the American Oriental Society, Vol. 89, No. 1 (January–March 1969), pp. 279–281
