= Special Illumination: The Sufi Use of Humour =

1977 book by Idries Shah

Special Illumination: The Sufi Use Of Humour
- Author: Idries Shah
- Language: English
- Publisher: Octagon Press Ltd
- Publication date: 1977
- Publication place: United Kingdom
- Media type: Print (Hardback
- ISBN: 978-0-900860-57-7
- OCLC: 4393483
- LC Class: MLCS 84/16795 (B)

Special Illumination: The Sufi Use Of Humour is a book by the writer Idries Shah published Octagon Press in 1977. Later editions were published in 1983, 1989 and 1997.

Shortly before he died, Shah stated that his books form a complete course that could fulfil the function he had fulfilled while alive. As such, Special Illumination can be read as part of a whole course of study.

== Content ==
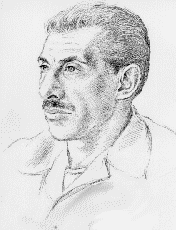
Idries Shah

Special Illumination was the phrase used by Jalaludin Rumi to stress the importance of humour in relation to mystical experience; "If you want special illumination look upon the human face: See clearly within laughter the Essence of Ultimate Truth."

Presenting commentaries, stories and jokes, Shah writes; "Rumi directly contradicts such numerous sour-faced religionists as, in all persuasions, find that humour disturbs the indoctrination which is all that they usually have to offer."

== Reception ==
In the essay The Sufis and Idries Shah, the Nobel Prize–winning novelist Doris Lessing writes that the book is about the Sufi use of humour, not an academic treatise, and takes the reader "through a sequence of tales, explaining possible meanings." She tells us that "Shah warns not to fall in love with the great classics of the past. 'People study Rumi and turn themselves into perfect replicas of 14th century people.' For classics to be of use, we need a Sufi to choose the parts that are still relevant, and put them into our context — to 'unlock' them."
