= Knowing How to Know =

1998 book by Idries Shah

- Author: Idries Shah
- Language: English
- Publisher: Octagon Press
- Publication date: 1998
- Publication place: United Kingdom
- Media type: Print (Hardback & Paperback)
- ISBN: 0-86304-072-1 (paperback edition)
- OCLC: 39505551

Knowing How to Know is a book by the writer Idries Shah published posthumously by Octagon Press in 1998. A paperback edition was published in 2000.

Shortly before he died, Shah stated that his books form a complete course that could fulfil the function he had fulfilled while alive. As such, Knowing How To Know can be read as part of a whole course of study.

== Content ==
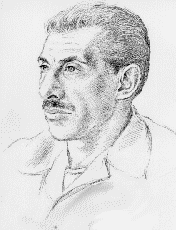
Idries Shah

Knowing How To Know builds on the foundations laid in Shah's previous publications Learning How to Learn: Psychology and Spirituality in the Sufi Way and The Commanding Self. Some of the themes addressed in the book include the often unrecognised barriers which prevent knowledge and understanding and the necessary conditions and factors which must be present for learning to take place.

== Reception ==
In a Sunday Telegraph review, Nobel Prize winner Doris Lessing wrote of Knowing How To Know that it "needs attentive reading, if only because some of its contentions are startling and need time to think about . . . This would not be a book by Shah if it were not often very funny. In short, those who know Shah's work will not need to be told it is a cornucopia of very various delights; those who do not may find it a fascinating introduction to the Sufi view of life."

The psychologist and writer Robert Ornstein stated that the book "presented a blueprint of the human mental structure.

Psychology Today described Knowing How To Know as "A major psychological and cultural event of our time" and the New York Times review commented that "One is immediately forced to use one's mind in a new way."
