= Wisdom of the Idiots =

1969 book by Idries Shah

- First cover
- Author: Idries Shah
- Language: English
- Genre: Sufi Literature
- Publisher: Octagon Press
- Publication date: 1969
- Publication place: United Kingdom
- Media type: Print (Paperback)
- Pages: 218
- OCLC: 20797803
- Preceded by: The Book of the Book
- Followed by: The Dermis Probe

Wisdom of the Idiots is a book of Sufi teaching stories by the writer Idries Shah first published by the Octagon Press in 1969. A paperback edition was published in 1991. ISF Publishing, sponsored by The Idries Shah Foundation, published a paperback edition on 2015, followed by the ebook version and audiobook.

== Content ==
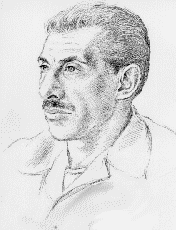
Idries Shah

Wisdom of the Idiots is a book of Sufi teaching stories designed to influence the reader using traditional Sufi psychology. Many stories are reminiscences of encounters with Sufis of long ago but experiences highlighted are valuable even from today's perspective. The carefully selected stories contain several levels of meaning and work like psychological mirrors in which the reader may see himself and Reality reflected, and come to understand these better.

'In Idries Shah's Wisdom of the Idiots, the 'idiots' are Sufis, called this because their wisdom penetrates to a depth which renders it inaccessible to the merely intelligent or academically-knowledgeable.'

Shortly before he died, Shah stated that his books form a complete course that could fulfill the function he had fulfilled while alive. As such, Wisdom of the Idiots can be read as part of a whole course of study.

== Reception ==
As part of the corpus of teaching stories/traditional psychology, Wisdom of the Idiots has grabbed the attention of modern researchers into psychology. Various techniques that modern science has claimed for itself are clearly present in materials provided centuries before. The psychologist Robert Ornstein has researched the psychological nature of human mind and brain and their relationship to thought, realised potential, and the applicability of traditional techniques for today's applications. Arthur Deikman, a clinical professor of psychiatry and pioneer investigator of mystical states from scientific point of view, studied under Shah and wrote extensively on functional approaches to mysticism. M.Y. Shawarbi, an authority on Islamic culture, scientist and author, says of this book "In comparative religion and metaphysics, the release of over five hundred "teaching stories" in Tales of the Dervishes, and Wisdom of the Idiots, and several other books was recognized in religious and philosophical journals as elucidating a hitherto very imperfectly known system of teaching." Wealth, volume and entertainment factor of these stories have spurred establishment of many organizations and colleges of story tellers.

Wisdom of the Idiots has been awarded many prizes, including two gold medals, one for being 'Best Book', in conjunction with UNESCO's World Book Year.
