= Reflections (Shah) =

1968 book by Idries Shah

- 2015 edition book cover
- Author: Idries Shah
- Language: English
- Genre: Eastern philosophy and culture. Sufism. Psychology.
- Published: 1968
- Publisher: Zenith Books
- Publication place: United Kingdom
- Media type: Print
- Pages: 104pp
- ISBN: 978-0-900860-00-3
- OCLC: 29632
- Preceded by: Caravan of Dreams
- Followed by: The Way of the Sufi

Reflections by Idries Shah is a collection of eighty fables, aphorisms, and statements that seek to challenge the conditioned mind. The book intends to confront the reader with unaccustomed perspectives and ideas, in an attempt to set the mind free, to see how things really are. As the book's foreword states, "Do you imagine that fables exist only to amuse or to instruct, and are based upon fiction? The best ones are delineations of what happens in real life, in the community and in the individual's mental processes."

== Content ==
Reflections is a collection of a foreword and eighty brief literary pieces which were designed for reflection. Many are as brief as this example:

History is not usually what has happened. History is what some people have thought to be significant.

== Reception ==
This small, pocket-sized book was well received by critics. In her review in The Observer, author Doris Lessing called Reflections "... a lively collection of fables, comments, aphorisms, its quality astringency." The New York Times Book Review called it "... witty, tart and instructional – they tend to come into your mind at appropriate moments." Pat Williams, reviewing for BBC's Review of the Year, stated that Reflections was "Very funny ... more wisdom than I have found in any other book this year. I found myself sitting up straight."
