= Institute for Cross-cultural Exchange =

Educational and cross-cultural organisation based in Calgary, Alberta, Canada

- Formation: 15 November 2004
- Type: Educational charity (Public foundation)
- Registration no.: 86260 1077 R0001
- Purpose: Providing for children's literacy and understanding between cultures
- Headquarters: Calgary, Alberta, Canada
- Region served: Canada, Mexico, Afghanistan
- Website: booksoverborders.org

The Institute for Cross-cultural Exchange (ICE) or Institut d'échanges interculturels (IEI) is an educational and cross-cultural non-profit organisation based in Calgary, Alberta, Canada. Administered and staffed entirely by volunteers, ICE promotes children’s literacy and cross-cultural education at home and abroad. It provides at-risk children with their very first books: illustrated and thought-provoking stories from the Middle East and Central Asia.

The Institute for Cross-cultural Exchange was registered as a public foundation in Canada on 15 November 2004, and its Charitable Registration Number is 86260 1077 R0001.

In 2022, the ICE was rebranded as Books Over Borders.

== Aims and activities ==
Following a survey of the literary crisis in Canada, ICE came across a non-profit initiative by American psychologist Robert Ornstein's Institute for the Study of Human Knowledge, called Hoopoe Books for Children, and decided that the universal themes in the teaching stories in this series of children's books, by the writer and Sufi teacher Idries Shah, would suit ICE's cross-cultural objectives.

In its first ten years ICE has donated free of charge over 164,000 books. Over 80 Canadian non-profit literacy groups have received over 92,000 books, six partner organizations in Afghanistan 71,000 books, and its partner organization in Mexico 1140 books.

In 2012, in the Canadian Pensioners Concerned newsletter Viewpoint, John Zada writes that – working in partnership with Hoopoe Books – in the first eight years of ICE's operations (2004–2012), the charity had purchased and “donated over 82,000 books to more than 80 non-profit literacy groups in Canada,” and donated “tens of thousands more titles overseas for children who are in similar circumstances.” ICE has partnered with many Canadian literacy organizations including ABC Head Start, Calgary Reads, Frontier College, United Way of Canada's “Success by Six” program, and the YMCA. Its funders include United Parcel Service (UPS), FK Morrow Foundation, Government of Alberta, ETFO Humanity Fund and Bridge Street United Church Foundation.

In addition, since 2010, working in partnership with organisations in Afghanistan, ICE has distributed thousands of editions in Dari and Pashto to schools, orphanages, libraries and non-governmental organizations throughout Afghanistan, and also hundreds of Spanish–English bilingual editions were provided for children in Mexico through a Christian missionary charity called One Life One Chance. John Zada points out that “for most of the children, [these] books were the first they ever owned.”

Speaking to the Toronto Star earlier in 2010, ICE Director and Corporate Secretary and children's author Aubrey Davis said that the charity hoped “to deliver 1.5 million illustrated Dari-Pashto books of traditional oral tales to Afghan children through their local partners, the Afghan Red Crescent Society, the Khatiz Organization for Rehabilitation and The Asia Foundation.”

In 2011, a group of Canadian Armed Forces members in Pohantoon-e-Hawayee (PeH) – part of NATO’s training mission to Afghanistan – purchased almost a thousand traditional Afghan books in Dari-Pashto through ICE. The books were given to children coming to the hospital, either as patients or as visiting family members to help promote literacy.

== Interviews ==
In 2006, ICE director Aubrey Davis was interviewed on CBC Radio One's Metro Morning. He was asked why ICE was celebrating the birthday of Mulla Nasrudin, an international jokester and sage, who may never have existed.

== See also ==
- The Idries Shah Foundation
- Interculturalism
- Mulla Nasrudin
- Teaching stories
