= Rom Landau =

Polish writer and sculptor (1899–1974)

- Born: 17 October 1899; Poland
- Died: 2 March 1974 (aged 74); Marrakesh
- Occupations: Writer; sculptor

Romuald Landau (1899–1974) was born in Poland but became a British citizen when he served as a volunteer in the Royal Air Force during the Second World War. He was a sculptor, author, educator, Foreign Service officer and specialist on Arab and Islamic culture. His particular area of interest was Morocco. He was also an art critic and book reviewer for several newspapers and periodicals, including The Spectator. He is buried in the Christian cemetery of Marrakesh, Morocco.

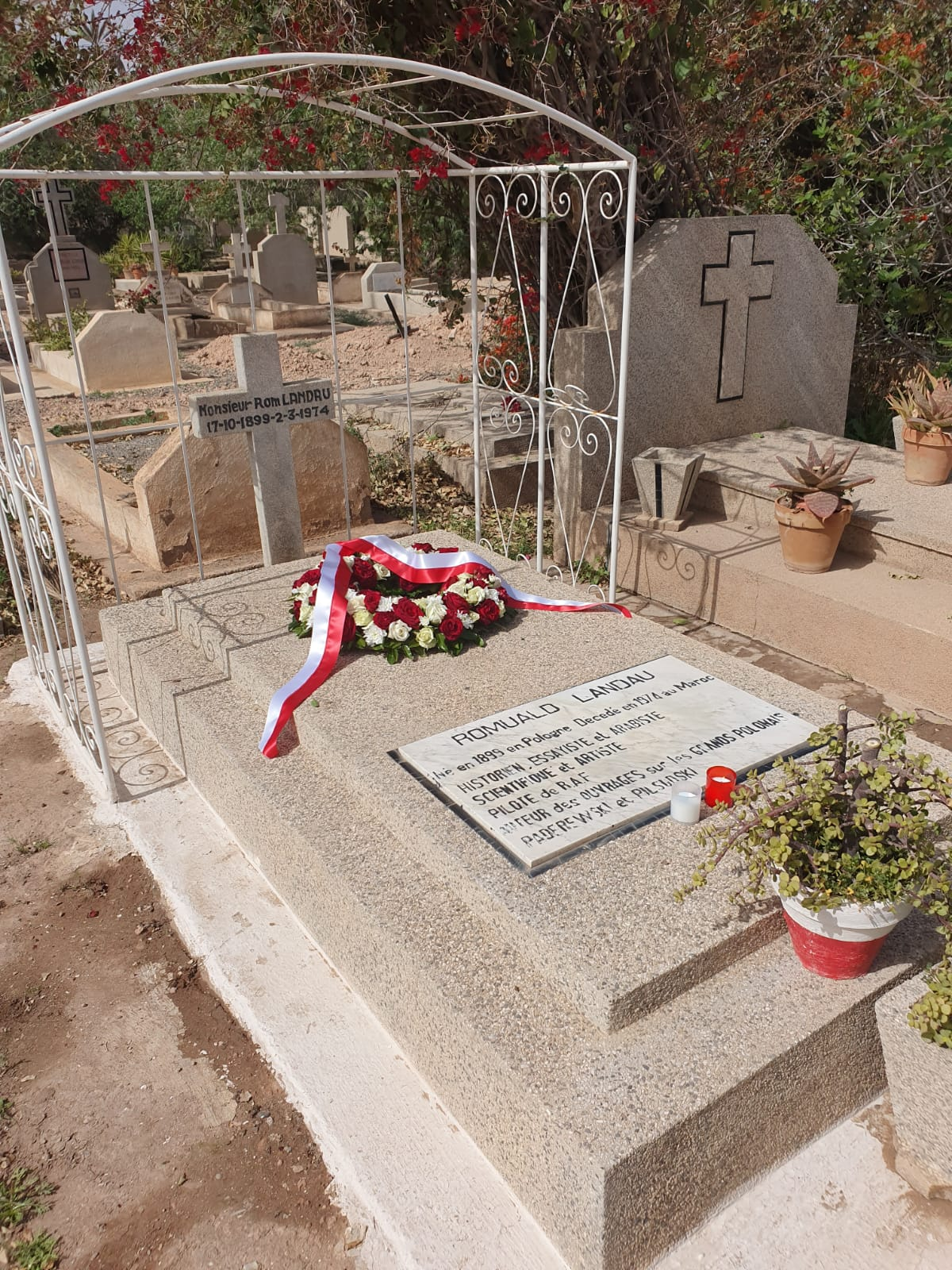
Rom Landau's grave in the cemetery in Marrakesh, Morocco

== Early life ==
Born of Polish-German parents, Landau studied philosophy, art, and religion at various European schools and universities, notably in Germany. He spent his early years travelling and working as a sculptor. In 1922, living in Berlin, he became the pupil of Georg Kolbe, then Germany's leading sculptor. During the late 1920s and the early 1930s, Landau established a minor reputation in Europe as a writer. His themes were art history, Polish biography (notably, Ignacy Jan Paderewski and Józef Klemens Piłsudski), and comparative religion. Landau's best known book from those years was God is My Adventure (1935).

=== Travels ===
Rom Landau first visited Morocco in 1924 and became a student of Islamic culture. Landau taught himself Arabic and spent as much time as he could afford living and travelling in North Africa and the Middle East. In 1937 he visited King Ibn Saud of Saudi Arabia, King Abdullah I of Jordan, and other secular and religious leaders of the Middle East. Landau published a book, Arm the Apostles (1938), about his trip in which he advocated arming the Arabs so that they might aid the British and French in the coming war with Nazi Germany.

=== Second World War ===
Landau became a British citizen and served as a volunteer in the Royal Air Force (1939–41), and later a member of the Arab Committee of the Intelligence Department of the British Foreign Office (1941–45). During this period he published (with A. J. Arberry) the standard work Islam Today (1943).

== Morocco ==
After the war, Landau returned to North Africa and he established close personal ties there with Sultan Mohammed V of Morocco and other Arab leaders of liberation movements. In 1948, he began to devote his writing skills exclusively to Morocco and Moroccan affairs. Over five years, Landau published Invitation to Morocco (1950); Moroccan Journal (1951); The Beauty of Morocco (1951); The Sultan of Morocco (1951); Morocco (for the Carnegie Endowment for International Peace, 1952); Portrait of Tangier (1952); and France and the Arabs (1953). He later published a historical study The Moroccan Drama 1900–1955 (1956), biographies of King Mohammed V (1957) and King Hassan II (1962) and History of Morocco in the Twentieth Century (1963). Landau also wrote numerous essays and book reviews for The Reporter, New Statesman, The Spectator and other British and American periodicals of the day. His involvement in the Moroccan cause for independence was not exclusively due to his political beliefs, but rather due to his positive experiences during his trips there and the connections with people. Part of his work Invitation to Morocco has been reviewed by a leader of Istiqlal to ensure that it reflected the agenda of the nationalist movement, and later on, he distributed the manuscript to British leaders and intellectuals, among which King George VI, Anthony Eden, Winston Churchill and Arnold Toynbee. Because of his involvement in the Moroccan struggle for independence, Landau eventually got banned from entering Morocco by the French authorities.

After the Moroccan independence in March 1956, Landau could return to Morocco. Upon his return, Sultan Mohammed V made him commander of the Order of Ouissam Alaouite.

== Academic years ==
After a lecture tour to the United States (1952–1953) Landau settled in San Francisco, where he was employed by Frederic Spiegelberg's American Academy of Asian Studies, headed for a period by the instructor Alan Watts. It soon affiliated with the University of the Pacific, in Stockton, California (1954), and Landau became a professor of Islamic Studies at the university (1956–1968) despite the fact that he had never finished an academic degree. In 1962–1963 he supervised the Peace Corps training program that prepared volunteers for service in Morocco. After his retirement (1968), Landau settled in Marrakesh, where he lived until his death.

== God is My Adventure ==
In his earlier career Landau wrote God is My Adventure (1935), a best-selling book in which he recounted his various contacts with leading figures and unusual persons of philosophical, religious, and mystical fame, such as Hermann Graf Keyserling, Jiddu Krishnamurti, Frank Buchman, Rudolf Steiner, G I Gurdjieff, P D Ouspensky, Meher Baba, and others.

James Webb relates an encounter that Landau had with Gurdjieff in the latter's New York hotel room in the early thirties while Landau was writing "God is my Adventure." "The interview went badly. Landau was discomposed by having unwanted cigarettes pressed upon him, and Gurdjieff did not intend to answer his questions. Even worse, the journalist appeared to be falling under some 'hypnotic influence' …" According to Whitall Perry, "Explaining that he himself is not at all telepathic, given to mediumship, or subject to hypnotism, Landau says … In a few seconds he felt his body from the waist down penetrated with a growing weakness enough to render him incapable of leaving his chair had he tried. Only by mustering all his concentration in talk with the young attendant did he finally manage to extricate himself … Upon departing he was presented by Gurdjieff with a copy of his Herald of Coming Good; it was bound in imitation suède, but of a grain so abrasive it made the teeth grind at the very touch. Landau realized that this was all part of an effect deliberately calculated by the author—whose book reads, moreover, as though conceived in clouds of Armagnac (the opening sentence alone, by Landau's count, contains not less than two hundred and eighty-four words)." Referring to the event, the Gurdjieffian, James Moore, describes Landau as "The lightweight sculptor and writer … greedy for copy, primed with sensational hearsay stories …" Before meeting Gurdjieff, Landau recounts, “One of his pupils said to me one day: ‘I imagine that Rasputin must have been like Gurdjieff: mysterious, domineering, attractive and frightening at the same time; full of overabundant vitality and of strange knowledge, inaccessible to other men.’ His hypnotic powers were never disputed, yet all his external methods constituted but an insignificant part of his far wider knowledge.”

== Collections ==
There are three main collections of Landau's work: the Rom Landau Papers, the Rom Landau Collection, and the Rom Landau Middle East Collection.

=== Rom Landau Papers (1927–1979) ===
Papers of the author are held at the Special Collections Research Center, Syracuse University Library, and divided into six series. Biographical data and public recognition comprises short excerpts of biographical information, instances where Landau was mentioned in the press, etc. Correspondence contains business (1927–1974), personal (1972–1974) and legal material. Writings and art consists of Landau's papers, manuscripts, lectures, notes, and speeches on the Middle East, political intelligence, religion, and other topics; it also includes a small selection of Landau's sculpture and a copy of his book, God is My Adventure. Printed material contains brochures for the University of Pacific. Memorabilia comprises personal items such as Moroccan art, copies of Landau's books, a passport, photographs, scrapbooks, silverware, and other miscellaneous items. Recordings contains reel-to-reel audio recordings made by Landau of the songs, music and dance of various countries in the Middle East, and some of his radio interviews, lectures and other speaking engagements, along with one apparently professional production, King Mohammed V by Leo Diner Films. There are also eight home-made recordings of opera singers and performances. Tapes relating to his Islamic studies are numbered and listed individually; opera recordings are not.

=== Rom Landau Collection (1899–1965) ===
The Collection primarily contains correspondence laid in books of Landau's, which were purchased by the University of California, Santa Barbara in 1967. There are three series in the collection: Correspondence to Rom Landau, Correspondence to The Spectator, and Ephemera. The correspondence includes letters from T. S. Eliot, E. M. Forster, George Bernard Shaw, and Virginia Woolf.

=== Rom Landau Middle East Collection (1920–1970) ===
This Collection consists chiefly of Rom Landau's personal library and other materials, notably clippings, periodicals and government documents that he used in teaching coursework in Islamic Studies at the University of the Pacific. The primary focus of these materials is Morocco. However, the collection also contains considerable material on the other nations of French North Africa, Algeria and Tunisia, along with a smaller body of books, pamphlets, and documents on other Islamic nations and on Israel/Palestine. The time period of greatest emphasis is the twenty-five years immediately following World War II (1945–1970). The Collection is arranged in four series: Manuscript Materials; Printed Matter on Morocco; Printed Matter on Muslim Lands; and Materials Unrelated to Islam and the Middle East.

== Publications ==
- 1925 Minos the Incorruptible;
- 1929 Pilsudski: Hero of Poland (Biography);
- 1934 Paderewski (Biography);
- 1935 God is My Adventure;
- 1936 Seven: An Essay in Confession (Autobiography);
- 1937 They Kingdom Come: Twelve Chapters on the Attainment of Truthful Living;
- 1938 Arm the Apostles;
- 1938 Search for Tomorrow;
- 1940 Love for a Country;
- 1940 Of No Importance: A Diary of a Private Life;
- 1941 Hitler’s Paradise;
- 1941 We Have See Evil: A Background to War;
- 1942 The Fools Progress: Aspects of British Civilization in Action;
- 1943 Islam Today (with Prof. A. J. Arberry);
- 1943 Letter to Andrew;
- 1944 The Brother Vane (Fiction);
- 1945 The Wing: Confessions of an R.A.F. Officer (Autobiography);
- 1946 Sex, Life and Faith, a Modern Philosophy of Sex;
- 1947 The Merry Oasis and Other Stories (Fiction);
- 1948 Human Relations;
- 1948 Odysseus (Fiction);
- 1949 Personalia;
- 1950 Invitation to Morocco;
- 1951 The Beauty of Morocco;
- 1951 The Sultan of Morocco;
- 1952 Moroccan Journal;
- 1952 Portrait of Tangier;
- 1953 Among the Americans;
- 1953 France and the Arabs;
- 1955 The Arabesque: the Abstract Art of Islam;
- 1956 The Moroccan Drama 1900–1955;
- 1957 King Mohammed V (Biography);
- 1958 Arab Contribution to Civilization;
- 1958 Islam and the Arabs;
- 1959 The Philosophy of Ibn Arabi;
- 1962 Hassan II: King of Morocco (Biography);
- 1962 The Arab Heritage of Western Civilization;
- 1963 History of Morocco in the Twentieth Century;
- 1967 Morocco;
- 1969 Kasbas of Southern Morocco.
