= Destination Mecca =

1957 book by Idries Shah

- Author: Idries Shah
- Language: English
- Publisher: Rider & Octagon Press Ltd
- Publication date: 1957
- Publication place: United Kingdom
- Media type: Print (Hardback)
- ISBN: 0-900860-03-0
- OCLC: 19631
- Dewey Decimal: 915.6
- LC Class: DS49 .S48 1969

Destination Mecca is an early book by the writer Idries Shah, who went on to produce an extensive corpus of material on Sufism that is both accessible and relevant to contemporary western readers. It was first published by Rider in 1957 (with photographs by the author), and subsequently by Octagon Press in 1969 (minus the photos). Shah had already made a name for himself as the author of two well-researched and in many ways ground-breaking books about magic. However, these scholarly works, and the vastly more influential work, The Sufis, which was to follow in 1964, by their nature entailed keeping his own personality in the background. His intention in this present book appears to be to counterbalance this tendency through his skilful use of the familiar travel book format, and he steps out of the shadows as an approachable young man with a lively mind and a fine sense of humour and adventure – someone who is comfortable in his mid-twentieth century skin and equally at home in Eastern and Western contexts.

== Content ==
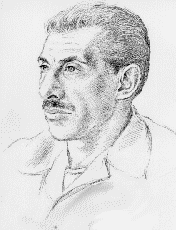
Idries Shah

Destination Mecca contains descriptions and photographs of some of Shah's travels in North Africa and the Near and Middle East, including time spent in Morocco, Egypt, Sudan, Lebanon, Jerusalem, Jordan and Saudi Arabia, where he describes pilgrimages to Mecca and Medina and being a guest of the Saudi Royal Family a few years before the death of Ibn Saud in 1953. Among the book's twenty-three pieces of reportage is also the description of a visit to a Bektashi Sufi community in Syria composed mainly of dervishes who had migrated there from Turkey when Kemal Atatürk had outlawed the practice of Sufism. Shah says that he had "been present often enough at the gatherings of Sufis in various places, taken part in their recitations and listened to their discourses" but that he wanted to get a clearer view of Sufi life and activities in the monasteries. He had a letter of introduction to the Sheikh of the community, and was invited to attend and participate in their activities and practices.

== Reception ==
The Times Literary Supplement review commented that "Sayed Idries Shah has done much to explain the world of Islam to Westerners and in particular, to promote the study of Sufi philosophy among English-speaking people... Much of what he writes illuminates factors of permanent importance in the Middle East; and no one can read this book without carrying away a lasting impression of the vigour and vitality of Islamic culture, and of the many surprising manifestations of that culture in the Asian world of today."
