= The Pleasantries of the Incredible Mulla Nasrudin =

Book by Idries Shah

- First edition
- Author: Idries Shah
- Language: English
- Publisher: Octagon Press, The Idries Shah Foundation
- Publication date: 1968, 2015
- Publication place: United Kingdom
- Media type: Print (Paperback), E-book, Audiobook
- ISBN: 0-86304-023-3 (earlier paperback edition)

The Pleasantries of the Incredible Mullah Nasrudin is a book by the writer Idries Shah, based on lectures he delivered at the University of Geneva as Visiting Professor in 1972–73. The book is a collection of tales, none more than two pages and almost all less than a page long, about the folkloric character Mulla Nasrudin. Published by Octagon Press in 1968, it was re-released in paperback, ebook and audiobook editions by The Idries Shah Foundation in 2015.

== Content ==
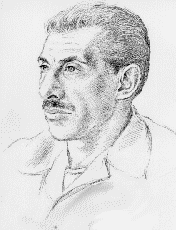
Idries Shah

Part of a series of books, The Pleasantries of the Incredible Mulla Nasrudin is a collection of teaching stories, anecdotes and jokes drawn from Middle Eastern folklore and the Sufi mystical tradition, which feature the populist Middle Eastern philosopher and wise fool, Mulla Nasrudin.

Thousands of stories have been written around this popular folk character over the centuries, since his purported birth in the 13th century.

== Reception ==
Douglas Hill, Literary Editor of the socialist Tribune weekly magazine, wrote in 1969 that The Pleasantries of the Incredible Mulla Nasrudin contained “a great deal of timeless and universal wisdom made accessible and highly attractive with humour”, adding that “conventional responses and received frames of mind are challenged on every page.”

In The New York Times, future Nobel Literature laureate Doris Lessing called The Pleasantries of the Incredible Mulla Nasrudin "perhaps the most shocking to our assumptions about ‘mysticism’” of Shah's books at the time. She said that this corpus of Nasrudin “jokes” was “deliberately created to inculcate Sufic thinking, to outwit The Old Villain, which is a name for the patterns of conditioned thinking which form the prison in which we all live."

In an earlier review in The Observer, Lessing said that most of the jokes in the book were new to the West while others could also be found in the written work of Sufis like Rumi, Attar and Jami. She said that "[Nasrudin's] antics are parallels of the mind's workings, designed to amuse the teahouses, but also for use on other levels". As an example she refers to their use at an international scientific conference to illustrate problems in physics that were otherwise difficult or impossible to verbalise.

== Collections of Mulla Nasrudin stories ==
- The Exploits of the Incomparable Mulla Nasrudin ISBN 0-86304-022-5 (1966, 2015)
- The Pleasantries of the Incredible Mulla Nasrudin ISBN 0-86304-023-3 (1968, 2015)
- The Subtleties of the Inimitable Mulla Nasrudin ISBN 0-86304-021-7 (1973)

Note: ISBNs refer to the original paperback editions, published by Octagon Press. For current ISBNs, see The Idries Shah Foundation.
