= Oriental Magic =

1956 book by Idries Shah

- 1957 US Edition
- Author: Idries Shah
- Language: English
- Genre: Eastern philosophy and culture
- Publisher: Philosophical Library
- Publication date: 1956-2015
- Publication place: United Kingdom
- Media type: Print (Paperback and eBook)
- Pages: 324
- OCLC: 27814529

Oriental Magic, by Idries Shah, is a study of magical practices in diverse cultures from Europe and Africa, through Asia to the Far East. Originally published in 1956 and still in print today, it was the first of this author's 35 books. The work was launched with the encouragement of the anthropologist, Professor Louis Marin, who in his preface to the book stressed its "scholarly accuracy" and "real contribution to knowledge".

Magic had long been considered outside the discipline of academic study, but Shah's approach, which involved five years of study and field work, was – very unusually for the 1950s – multi-disciplinary and cross-cultural. His documented material came from archaeology, anthropology, history, religion, and psychology, as well as from artefacts, obscure manuscripts, and an impressive range of expert informants, who made (often unpublished) specialist material available to him. As a result, the secrecy and obfuscation around magical operations and practitioners was defused by the author's informed, dispassionate approach to the array of arcane information he had assembled, some of it printed for the first time. Oriental Magic seems also to have been a clearly stated invitation for magic in general to be investigated as any other subject in the West would be, with coolness, objectivity and scientific method. The book in itself can be seen as providing a ground plan for future researchers, signalling useful directions their investigations might take, and specifying topics which might yield to further study.

== Content ==
The author examines a vast accumulation of materials on human beliefs, magical practices and ceremonies, from North Africa to Japan. Among much else, these include a conspectus of Jewish, Tibetan, Arabian, Iranian and Indian magic, an account of Sufism and its origins, legends of the sorcerers, examples of alchemy, talismans and magical rites found in the cultures studied, and topics such as love magic, the witchdoctors of the Nile Valley, the "singing sands" of Egypt, subcutaneous electricity, and the prehistoric sources of Babylonian occult practices. There are also personal accounts of, for instance, Shah's training under a Ju-Ju witch doctor, a demonstration of Hindu levitation, and translations of what were considered secret alchemical and magical formulae.

Shah finds that magical origins in High Asia have influenced communities halfway across the world, and that the westward drift from that original source might explain the great similarity in magical beliefs, practices and terminology in places as diverse as China, the Near East, Scandinavia and Africa. The type of witch-doctoring (shamanism) practised in the east, for example, is duplicated among the Finns, the Sami, and even the American Indians.

The author tracks distortions from original sources, winnows fact from supposition, allows for alternative explanations of phenomena, such as physiological and psychological responses which are separate from the apparent "magic", and shows how much dross has accumulated around many of the practices he inspects. But he suggests there also remains a residue of what, in magical terminology, could be called "pure gold", and that some of this "gold" is likely to reflect hitherto little-understood forces "which may very possibly be harnessed to individual and collective advantage".

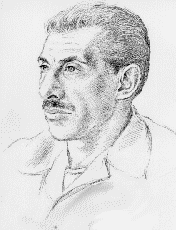
Idries Shah

== Reception ==
Oriental Magic has been in print for more than 50 years. The Book Exchange, referring to its re-publication in 1968, said the book had "come to be regarded as essential reading for those concerned with research in the fields of human beliefs". At the time of first publication, The Times Literary Supplement described it as containing a "wealth of illustrative material" for which the lay reader might be grateful. The religious periodical, Hibbert Journal, called it "fascinating and illuminating", with "a great deal of interesting information", and said that "the accounts of personal experience in the Sudan and Tibet were "especially ... fascinating". Time & Tide, a general circulation weekly, said it was "a most interesting collection of facts concerning magical practices and their history", with "an admirable bibliography" and also ... "heaped with various jewels" ... [which] "should provide a rich source of data for psychologists, anthropologists and psychical research". The scientific journal Nature said Shah's approach was "a point of view of which too little has been heard in the past", and recommended the work as "valuable and entertaining reading". Contemporary Review called it "a serious work of considerable anthropological interest." Professor Louis Marin wrote: "Oriental Magic deserves to find a wide audience of educated readers".

In a review in the Journal of Bible and Religion (1958), Swami Akhilananda of the Ramakrishna Vedanta Society in Boston, Massachusetts, wrote that Shah had been "the first to write on Oriental Magic as it is presented in this fascinating book." He praised the breadth of the book's coverage, noting that it covered many different religious traditions, and commented on the fact that Shah had evidently travelled widely to collect his source material.

Reviewing the book in the Journal of Asian Studies (1958), Alan J. A. Elliot wrote that "Shah obviously has a profound personal interest in the occult, and has gone to very great lengths to collect a great amount on interesting information. His method of exposition is, however, most likely to appeal to the reader without a strongly developed scientific interest in the subject." Elliott considered the book too short to do justice to the wide range of practices and traditions it sought to cover, spanning all of Europe and much of Africa and Asia; nevertheless he concluded Oriental Magic was a "well-written and interesting book", and a "contribution to the study of the occult, whatever the source of a student's interest in the subject may be."

== See also ==
- Eleven Naqshbandi principles
