= Afghan Relief =

Organization

The objects of this Trust were to relieve poverty and sickness and promote health and advance education amongst refugees from Afghanistan during the Russian occupation.

The charity was registered on 25 July 1984 and was wound-up on 3 October 2002. Registered Charity Commission for England and Wales Number 289910.
