= The Hundred Tales of Wisdom =

- Author: Idries Shah
- Translator: Idries Shah
- Language: English
- Genre: Sufism, biography, religion
- Publisher: Octagon Press ISF Publishing
- Publication date: 2018
- Publication place: United Kingdom
- Media type: Print (Hardback & Paperback). eBook and audiobook
- ISBN: 978-1-78479-138-4
- OCLC: 59836719

The Hundred Tales of Wisdom is a translation from the Persian by Idries Shah of the "Life, Teachings and Miracles of Jalaludin Rumi" from Aflaki's Munaqib, together with certain important stories from Rumi’s own works, traditionally known by that title. It was published by Octagon Press in 1978.

== Summary ==
The tales, anecdotes and narratives in this collection are used in Sufi schools for the development of insights beyond ordinary perceptions. Although the number 100 is used in the title, in Idries Shah’s presentation there are 159 tales beginning with a brief description of Rumi’s childhood and youth.

== Reception ==
The author Doris Lessing wrote in Books and Bookmen: "The Hundred Tales is traditional hagiography, a classic studied for seven hundred years by students of the Sufi Way as part of the 'curriculum' – and that means Christians and Jews as well as Muslims. It concerns Rumi, the saint whose funeral was attended by members of these and other faiths, all saying he was their teacher. What has been needed is a simple and clear version ... and here it is."
