= James Moore (Cornish author) =

Cornish author (1929-2017)

James Harry Manson Moore (16 December 1929 – 11 May 2017) was a Cornish author. He was a fellow of the Royal Asiatic Society and a leading authority on G. I. Gurdjieff.

== Life and career ==
Moore was born in Saltash, Cornwall in December 1929. He was a leading authority on G. I. Gurdjieff, becoming active in practical and thematic Gurdjieff studies from 1956, after studying with Kenneth Walker and later with Henriette H. Lannes ("Madame Lannes") as his Gurdjieffian teacher and mentor between October 1957 and December 1978. His first major study, Gurdjieff and Mansfield (1980), examined the lives of Gurdjieff and the short story writer Katherine Mansfield. Moore's book challenged the persistent belief that Gurdjieff was somehow responsible when Mansfield, who arrived at Gurdjieff's institute in France suffering from terminal tuberculosis, died within a few months while still his guest.

From 1981 to 1994, Moore was responsible for gathering and leading new students in the Gurdjieff Society in London. He contributed to research for the 363-page Gurdjieff: an Annotated Bibliography (1985) compiled by J. Walter Driscoll and the Gurdjieff Foundation of California. During this period he was also a pupil of Henri Tracol and Maurice Desselle.

A confessed admirer of Gurdjieff and active Gurdjieffian for his entire adult life, Moore was the author of the biography Gurdjieff: The Anatomy of a Myth (1991). It was republished in 1999 with a revised introduction, under the title Gurdjieff: A biography.

In 1994, Moore published "Moveable Feasts: the Gurdjieff Work" in Religion Today, challenging certain significant innovations in Gurdjieffian theory and practice introduced worldwide by Jeanne de Salzmann, the Gurdjieff Foundation's de facto leader. (See external links for text of this article.) After his departure from the Foundation's Gurdjieff Society in London, Moore led an independent Gurdjieff Studies group.

In "Gurdjieffian Confessions" (2005), Moore briefly sketched his personal life and provided candid and vivid glimpses of his 38 years as a member of The Gurdjieff Society in London, between 1956 and 1994.

In 2011 Moore published "Eminent Gurdjieffians: Lord Pentland"; John Pentland was Henry John Sinclair, 2nd Baron Pentland (1907–1984). Moore's 100-page biography was written in the style of Lytton Strachey's compact 1918 classic "Eminent Victorians". John Pentland was a follower of P. D. Ouspensky for more than a decade, then associated with G. I. Gurdjieff in Paris during his last two years, 1948–1949. Lord Pentland was president of the Gurdjieff Foundation of New York between its founding in 1953 and his death in 1984.

Moore died in Ealing, London in May 2017 at the age of 87.

== Selected works ==
- (1980) Gurdjieff and Mansfield
- (1991) Gurdjieff: The Anatomy of a Myth, ISBN 1-85230-450-2
- (2005) Gurdjieffian Confessions: a self remembered
- (2011) Eminent Gurdjieffians: Lord Pentland ISBN 0-9549470-1-0
