= Laurence Paul Elwell-Sutton =

British scholar of Persian culture and Islamic studies (1912-1984)

Laurence Paul Elwell-Sutton (1912–1984) was a British scholar of Persian culture and Islamic studies.

He was professor emeritus at the University of Edinburgh, where he held a chair in the school's Department of Islamic and Middle Eastern Studies. He was noted for a variety of published works on Persian language, Persian literature and folklore; modern Persian political history, and Islamic science. His 1955 book Persian Oil: a Study in Power Politics is noted as both influential and controversial. For his studies in the Middle East, he noted as being able to speak in both Arabic and Persian.

Elwell-Sutton was born in Ballylickey, Ireland on 2 June 1912. He attended Winchester College and earned his honors degree in Arabic at the School of Oriental Studies at the University of London in 1934. From 1935 to 1938 he worked for the Anglo-Persian Oil Company in Abadan, Iran. He then worked for several years as an expert on Persia for the BBC, before serving as the press attaché for the British Embassy in Tehran from 1943 to 1947. He took up a post as lecturer at the University of Edinburgh in 1952, which he held until his retirement in 1982.

Elwell-Sutton died in Edinburgh, Scotland on 2 September 1984.
