= Learning How to Learn =

1978 book by the writer Idries Shah

Learning How to Learn: Psychology and Spirituality in the Sufi Way
- First edition
- Author: Idries Shah
- Language: English
- Genre: Sufism
- Publisher: Octagon Press
- Publication date: 1978
- Publication place: United Kingdom
- Media type: Print (Hardback & Paperback) eBook and audiobook.
- ISBN: 978-1-78479-108-7 (paperback edition)
- OCLC: 4393469
- Dewey Decimal: 297/.4
- LC Class: BP189.2 .S5

Learning How to Learn: Psychology and Spirituality in the Sufi Way is a book by the writer Idries Shah that was first published by Octagon Press in 1978. Later editions by Harper & Row (1981) and Penguin Books (1985, 1993, 1996) include an introduction by Nobel Prize Winner Doris Lessing.

Shortly before he died, Shah stated that his books form a complete course that could fulfil the function he had fulfilled while alive. As such, Learning How to Learn: Psychology and Spirituality in the Sufi Way can be read as part of a whole course of study.

== Content ==
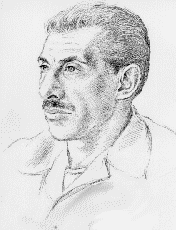
Idries Shah

Written in response to enquiries about the Sufi tradition, Learning How to Learn: Psychology and Spirituality in the Sufi Way presents traditional teaching stories and anecdotes and articles from newspapers to illustrate prerequisites to Sufi learning. One such prerequisite is that the learner should organise their basic human needs so as to be able to give adequate attention to their studies. The second section of the book is dedicated entirely to Shah's theory on the human need to give and receive attention.

== Reception ==
The theory on attention presented in the book has influenced the school of psychology and psychotherapy known as the Human Givens Approach. In Human Givens: A New Approach To Clear-Thinking and Emotional Wellbeing (2003) by Ivan Tyrrell and Joe Griffin, the authors state that in their view Shah's theory represents "a profoundly more subtle understanding of the importance of attention than found in Western psychology till now" and go on to quote in full the 21 principles of attention that Shah considered worthy of study.

Richard Smoley and Jay Kinney, writing in Hidden Wisdom: A Guide to the Western Inner Traditions (2006), described Learning How to Learn as one of Shah's best works. They noted that the book provided a solid orientation to Shah's "psychological" approach to Sufi work and added that Shah, at his best, provides "insights that inoculate students against much of the nonsense in the spiritual marketplace".

In September 1978 Psychology Today described the book as "the watershed in studies of the mind" and elsewhere as "a textbook of method and attitude".
