= The Exploits of the Incomparable Mulla Nasrudin =

1966 folk story collection by Idries Shah

- First UK edition
- Author: Idries Shah
- Language: English
- Publisher: Jonathan Cape
- Publication date: January 1966
- Publication place: United Kingdom
- Media type: Print (Paperback), E-book, Audiobook
- ISBN: 0-86304-022-5 (earlier paperback edition)

The Exploits of the Incomparable Mulla Nasrudin is a book by the writer Idries Shah, It consists of jokes and anecdotes involving the wise fool of Middle Eastern folklore Mulla Nasrudin. Published by Octagon Press in 1966, the book was re-released by the Idries Shah Foundation in 2014 and 2015.

Shortly before he died, Shah stated that his books form a complete course that could fulfil the function he had fulfilled while alive. As such, The Exploits of the Incomparable Mulla Nasrudin can be read as part of a whole course of study.

== Content ==
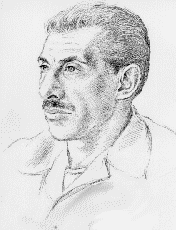
Idries Shah

The Exploits of the Incomparable Mulla Nasrudin is a collection of anecdotes and jokes drawn from Middle Eastern folklore and the mystical tradition of Sufism which feature the philosopher, Mullah, and wise fool Nasrudin. Thousands of stories have been written around this folk character since his purported birth in the 13th century in what is now modern Turkey.

== Use of the materials ==
Masters in the Sufi mystical tradition have used these anecdotes and jokes as teaching stories, as part of their pupils' training in wisdom.

The animator Richard Williams illustrated the original series of Nasrudin books, and also worked on an animated film featuring the character, which was produced by Idries Shah's brother, Omar Ali-Shah. Williams lost the rights to the character of Nasrudin before the film was completed; he later used some of the animation to create The Thief and the Cobbler.

In an article in the Los Angeles Review of Books, writer John Zada uses the Sufi materials, including some of the Nasrudin tales, to explain developments in the contemporary world, such as the rise of Islamist fundamentalism under ISIS and the rise of Donald Trump. Zada is of the opinion that we need the Sufis' moderate and flexible thinking to counter polemics and fanaticism in all its forms.

== Collections of Mulla Nasrudin stories ==
Shah wrote three books about Mulla Nasrudin.

- The Exploits of the Incomparable Mulla Nasrudin ISBN 0-86304-022-5 (1966, 2015)
- The Pleasantries of the Incredible Mulla Nasrudin ISBN 0-86304-023-3 (1968, 2015)
- The Subtleties of the Inimitable Mulla Nasrudin ISBN 0-86304-021-7 (1973)

Note: ISBNs refer to the original paperback editions, published by Octagon Press. For current ISBNs, see the Idries Shah Foundation.
