= Institute for the Study of Human Knowledge =

American educational nonprofit (1969-)

- Official logo
- Formation: 1969
- Type: NGO, educational charity, publisher
- Purpose: Health and human nature information
- Headquarters: Los Altos, California, US
- Founder: Robert E. Ornstein
- President: David Sasseen
- Executive Director: Sally Mallam
- Board of directors: Shane DeHaven – Secretary Jill Barnes – Treasurer Directors: Margaret Caudill Jonathan Russell Charles Swencionis
- Website: www.ishk.net

The Institute for the Study of Human Knowledge (ISHK) is a non-profit educational charity and publisher through the imprints Malor Books and Hoopoe Books, established in 1969 by the psychologist and writer Robert E. Ornstein and based in Los Altos, California, in the United States. Its aim is to provide public education and information on issues of health and human nature.

== Founder ==
Robert Ornstein, psychologist, writer and professor at Stanford University, founded and chaired ISHK. He has also contributed to the London-based Institute for Cultural Research set up by his associate, the writer and Sufi teacher, Idries Shah.

== Aims and activities ==
ISHK's primary aim is public education, by providing new information on health and human nature through its book service, through its children's imprint Hoopoe Books and adult imprint Malor Books, which includes the works of Robert Ornstein. Hoopoe Books focuses on publishing traditional children's stories from Afghanistan, Central Asia and the Middle East, including works by Idries Shah, such as The Lion Who Saw Himself in the Water.

The Institute also operates philanthropic projects, including Share Literacy, which provides books for children; support for caregivers; training and support for teachers, and independent program evaluation. Through its Share Literacy Program, Hoopoe Books has partnered with other organizations to give books away to children in low-income areas. It also provides books free of charge to lending libraries.

ISHK has worked with organizations such as The Institute for Cross-cultural Exchange to provide children in Afghanistan with desperately needed books for distribution to schools, orphanages and libraries throughout the country, in order to address the literacy crisis.

Events organized by ISHK include a symposium in 2006 on "The Core of Early Christian Spirituality: Its Relevance to the World Today" which featured presentations by Elaine Pagels, well known for her studies and writing on the Gnostic Gospels (Beyond Belief: A Different View of Christianity); New Testament scholar Bart D. Ehrman (Jesus and the Apocalyptic Vision), and scholar of religion and Professor, Marvin Meyer (Magdalene in the Gnostic Gospels: From the Gospel of Mary to the DaVinci Code, Mary Magdelene in History and Culture). In 1976, Robert Ornstein and Idries Shah presented a seminar, Traditional Esoteric Psychologies in Contemporary Life, in cooperation with The New School, New York City.

In 2010, ISHK set up a web site for a project entitled The Human Journey. It aims to "follow humanity from our origins in Eastern Africa and the Middle East to the present day, with an eye to what comes next."

== See also ==
- The Institute for Cultural Research (1965–2013)
- The Idries Shah Foundation (2013 onwards)
