= Caravan of Dreams (book) =

1968 Sufi book by Idries Shah

- First edition
- Author: Idries Shah
- Language: English
- Published: 1968
- Publisher: Octagon Press
- Publication date: 1968
- Publication place: United Kingdom
- Media type: Print (Paperback & eBook). Audiobook
- Pages: 260
- OCLC: 974260577
- Preceded by: Tales of the Dervishes
- Followed by: Reflections

Caravan of Dreams is a book by Idries Shah first published in 1968 by Octagon Press as part of his presentation of traditional Eastern teachings and Sufi ideas for contemporary society. New editions of the book were published in 2015 by The Idries Shah Foundation.

Shah relates the title to three traditional sources: the story of Maruf the Cobbler, which can be found in the One Thousand and One Nights; a proverb which says, “The Dog may bark, but the Caravan moves on”; and some verses from the Sufi Master Bahaudin Naqshband which read:

“Here we are, all of us: in a dream-caravan.
A caravan, but a dream – a dream, but a caravan.
And we know which are the dreams.
Therein lies the hope.”

== Summary / content ==
The book contains sections on the Traditions (Hadiths) of the Islamic prophet Muhammad (primarily from the Mishkat of Al-Baghawi of Herat), the folktales of Mulla Nasrudin, thoughts from Omar Khayyam, meditations of Rumi, and the definitions of Mulla Do-Piaza, as well as sayings from many classical Sufi Masters like Saadi, Bahaudin Naqshband and Khwaja Ahrar. Also included are some excerpts about Islamic culture and history from Edward Gibbon's Decline and Fall of the Roman Empire and from Shah's earlier book of travels, Destination Mecca. Two anecdotes are about Shah's great-great grandfather, Jan-Fishan Khan.

Much of the book is devoted to important teaching stories from the Middle East and Central Asia, such as "The Four Men and the Interpreter" (from Rumi's Masnavi), "The Magic Horse" (from the Arabian Nights), and "The Story of Mushkil Gusha" (a Persian tale traditionally recited on Thursday nights). Two folktales are contributed by Shah's sister, Amina Shah.

Doris Lessing commented on how in this book "Shah spoke openly, but briefly, about the Sufi use of tales..." and she explained that "Sufis have always taught through stories, and pedants and traditionalists have perennially complained – and sometimes about the greatest of the Sufis – 'but these are merely tales of the kind you tell to children.' The claim is that the action of the genuine Sufi teaching story is 'direct and certain' upon the innermost self of the human being and this is true whether or not the said human is prepared to acknowledge that he or she has an innermost self. This attitude to literature brings us into an unfamiliar relation with our own literary heritage. The tales, anecdotes, illustrative recitals, jokes are not meant to be attacked by the intellectual apparatus..."

Science fiction author, editor and reviewer, Douglas Hill reiterates Shah's assertion that the stories are not only entertaining, but establish in the reader "a means of communication with a non-verbalised truth." The psychologist Robert Ornstein states that teaching tales like the ones found in Caravan of Dreams are traditionally used for the indirect communication of knowledge.

In his introduction to "The Magic Horse", Shah writes that teaching stories operate on a level different from that of fables and parables and, when intact, are a "priceless heritage of mankind" and precisely tooled instruments to "assist the interior movement of the mind."

== Reception ==
Douglas Hill wrote in Tribune that the teaching stories form the "real value" of the book: "One can read a story or two and be delighted. But the effect does not stop there. These stories adhere, return, seeming somehow to expand after reading into an area beyond outer consciousness. Like fine poems, their balanced harmonies appeal... they seem to enrich, elevate, nourish, without intellectualisation or special emotional attunement. The experience is more than rewarding, and impossible to forget."

A review in New Society said that the book indicates "real possibilities and practical alternatives to our present ways of operation; presenting not idle fantasies but signals from the tradition of known and tested activity; relevant, fruitful and urgent for our present society... Throughout the book notes are sounded, models given, maps drawn. Much is channelled through 'teaching stories' [which] concern human patterns of criticism, notions of communication, ideas of justice, and obstacles of self-esteem... Informing, instructing, entertaining, alarming: with funny and intensely painful moments, others of immediate practicality, and others... of extraordinary enchantment."

Award-winning author and later winner of the 2007 Nobel Prize in Literature, Doris Lessing wrote that the book has information which is a "useful corrective" to the West's ignorance and prejudice about Islam, Islamic cultures and Islamic Sufism.

A 1973 review in Afghanistan's Kabul Times said that Caravan of Dreams was "highly recommended" and "of especial interest to Afghans" because it is "basically an anthology of short stories, tales and proverbs, jokes and extracts, from the written and oral literature which forms a part of many an evening's talk and interchange – even in these modern times – in Afghanistan." They pointed out that the book – which seemingly discussed almost every facet of Islamic life and thought – had been well-received in the United States and Continental Europe, and was on the reading list of several universities in Islamic and literature courses. They added that the book was also recommended for the purpose of deep psychological study by people like Professor Robert E. Ornstein (in his book The Psychology of Consciousness) because it illustrates the pioneering work of Islamic thinkers who depicted, in traditional literature from many centuries ago, patterns and workings of the mind and brain now confirmed by modern scientific studies.

The Hindustan Standard of India found that Caravan of Dreams was a "fabulous collection of folklore nuggets from the West and Central Asia... extracts, thoughts and teachings, in very readable translation, of the unknown wise men of, in and around Arabia. The horse-sense of some of the anecdotes and stories is equally amusing and rewarding... This is a fine anthology, dippable-into at any time for entertainment, refreshment, consolation, and inspiration... witty, engrossing, utterly and appealingly human."
