= Zameer Uddin Shah =

Indian Army general and academician

Lieutenant general Zameer Uddin Shah PVSM, SM, VSM
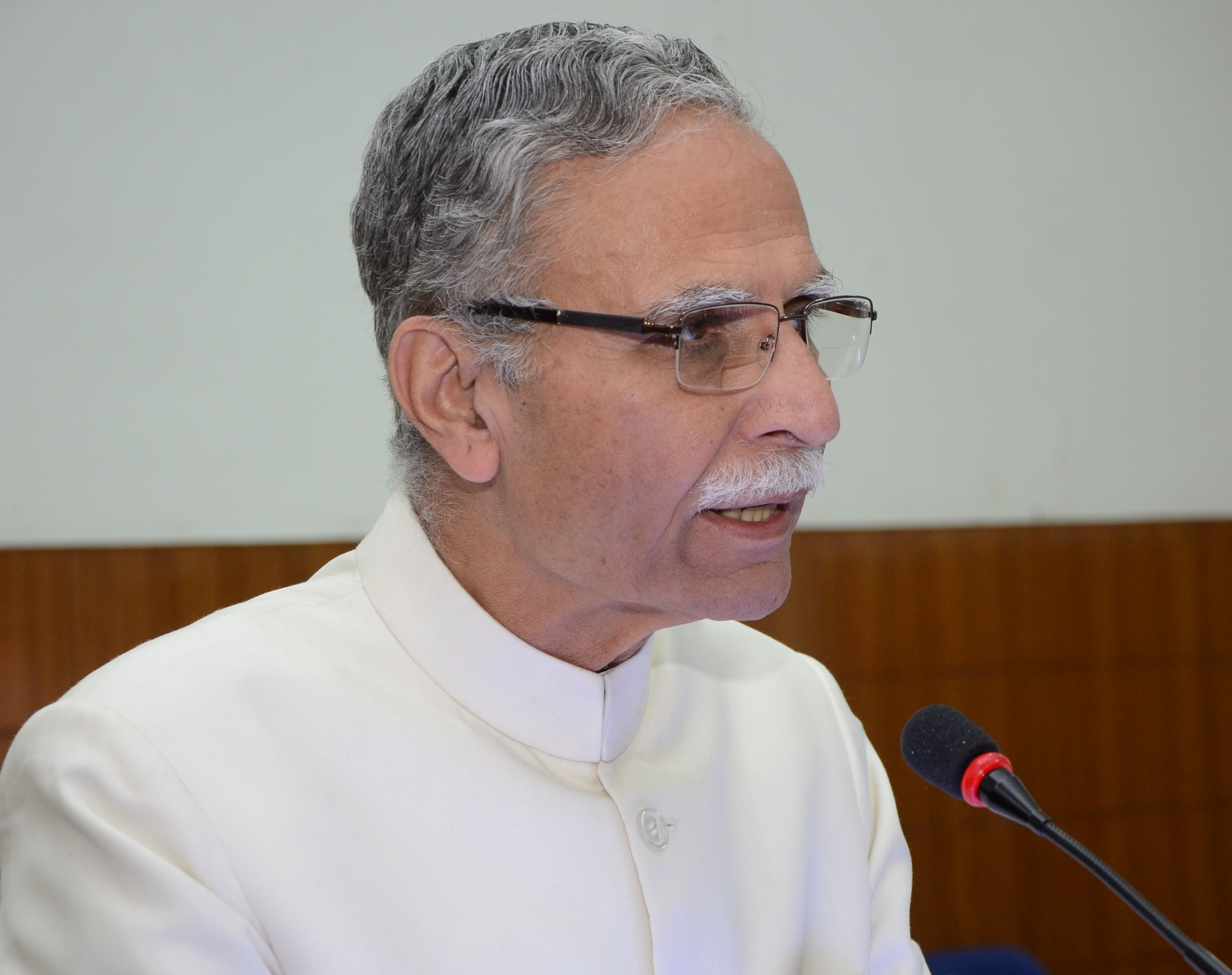

20th Vice-chancellor of Aligarh Muslim University
- In office 17 May 2012 – 17 May 2017
- Chancellor: Mohammed Burhanuddin
- Preceded by: P. K. Abdul Aziz
- Succeeded by: Tariq Mansoor

Deputy Chief of Army Staff (Personnel & Systems)
- In office 1 October 2006 – 31 August 2008
- President: A.P.J Abdul Kalam
- Preceded by: Gurditar Singh
- Succeeded by: Manbir Singh Dadwal

Personal details
- Pronunciation: [zəmiːɾ ʊd̪ːiːn ʃɑːɦ]
- Born: 15 August 1948 (age 78) Bahraich, United Provinces, India
- Relations: Naseeruddin Shah (brother); Vivaan Shah (nephew); Imaad Shah (nephew)
- Children: Mohommed Ali Shah (son); Saira Shah Halim (daughter)
- Education: National Defence Academy (B.Sc.); Indian Military Academy, Dehradun; University of Madras, Chennai (M.Sc.); Devi Ahilya Vishwavidyalaya, Indore (M.Phil.)
- Awards: Param Vishisht Seva Medal; Sena Medal; Vishisht Seva Medal

Military service
- Allegiance: India
- Branch/service: Indian Army
- Years of service: 1968–2008
- Rank: Lieutenant general
- Unit: Regiment of Artillery
- Commands: III Corps; Bengal Area; 54 Infantry Division; 170 Medium Regiment
- Battles/wars: 1971 Indo-Pakistani War

Lieutenant General Zameer Uddin Shah (Note: Urdu pronunciation: [zəmiːɾ ʊd̪ːiːn ʃɑːɦ].) (Urdu pronunciation: [zəmiːɾ ʊd̪ːiːn ʃɑːɦ]; born 15 August 1948), PVSM, SM, VSM is an Indian retired military officer who was a senior general of the Indian Army. He last served as the Deputy Chief of the Indian Army Staff (Personnel & Systems). After retirement, he served for some time as an administrative member on the bench of the Armed Forces Tribunal. He was the vice-chancellor of Aligarh Muslim University.

== Early life and education ==
Zameer Uddin Shah was born on 15 August 1948 in Bahraich, United Provinces, India. His great-great-grandfather was the Afghan warlord Jan-Fishan Khan, who would go on to become the Nawab of Sardhana. His relatives include Ikbal Ali Shah, Amina Shah, Omar Ali-Shah and Idries Shah.

He is the elder brother of noted Indian actor Naseeruddin Shah and thus the brother-in-law of actress Ratna Pathak and paternal uncle of actors Imaad Shah and Vivaan Shah.

Zameer Uddin Shah is an alumnus of St. Joseph’s College. Shah holds a Master of Science degree in defence science from the University of Madras and a Master of Philosophy degree from Devi Ahilya Vishwavidyalaya, a state university in Indore.

== Military career ==
Shah attended the National Defence Academy in Khadakwasla, Pune. He was commissioned with the 185 Light Regiment (Camel Pack) on 9 June 1968. He also commanded the 170 Medium Regiment (Veer Rajputs). Shah was later the colonel commandant of the Regiment of Artillery. He was also the Indian military attaché to Saudi Arabia. He led the Army during the 2002 Gujarat riots.

== Vice-chancellor of AMU ==
Shah was the vice-chancellor of Aligarh Muslim University from 2012 to 2017. From 2010 to 2015, Shah’s appointment as the vice-chancellor of the university was the subject of a petition in the Allahabad High Court as the regulations of the University Grants Commission state that vice-chancellors of a university are required to work as a professor in a university or in an equivalent post in an academic institute for at least 10 years before they can be appointed to the position in any institute. The High Court dismissed their petition and allowed him to stay in his position, however petitioners later made an appeal to the Supreme Court. In September 2016, the Supreme Court questioned the appointment of Shah as the vice-chancellor of the university and asserted that all universities in the country have to follow the rules prescribed by the UGC. Shah, however, was allowed to serve in his position until the expiration of his term in May 2017. The petition was supported by a number of people and lobbies associated with the university who had also alleged that Shah’s appointment, as well as many of the decisions made by him after coming to power, were a result of corruption.

=== Controversies ===
In 2014, the Minister of Education Smriti Irani and a section of the media claimed that Shah had banned undergraduate girls from accessing Maulana Azad Library using a quote from him saying that the library would have “four times more boys” if undergraduate girls were allowed to enter the library and that the library was already “cramped for space.” Irani termed the remark an “insult to daughters.”

Shah said that his comments were being stretched out of context and sensationalised, that the undergraduates from Abdullah College and the Women's College were not allowed to come to the central library because it was overcrowded and that there were issues of women's safety on the route. He also said they had access to top of the order libraries at their own colleges and that they could still access the central library digitally. In the middle of national reportage of alleged sexist discrimination based on the Minister's comments, the matter also went to the Allahabad High Court which directed the university to take adequate measures to ensure the safety of women attending the library.

The Women's College Students Union had demanded the university administration to improve safety of women, to extend the library and extend high speed Wi-Fi access instead of imposing restrictions on girls. However on the matter of the national attention, they protested against the media for "biased reporting" and told the Minister to stay away from the matter. Shah later banned reporters from The Times of India, which first reported the library ban, from entering the campus of the university.

In 2015, Shah said Muslims lagged behind in the development race because they kept their women “enslaved” and not working during Ramzan.

== Personal life ==
Shah is married and has two children: actor Mohommed Ali Shah and Saira Shah Halim.

== Bibliography ==
- Shah, Zameer Uddin (2018). The Sarkari Mussalman. Konark Publishers Pvt. Ltd.

== See also ==
- Lieutenant General Syed Ata Hasnain
- Lieutenant General Sami Khan
- Lieutenant General Jameel Mahmood
- Lieutenant General Mohammad Ahmed Zaki

== Notes ==
Military offices
Preceded by S. Pattabhiraman	General officer commanding 54 Infantry Division; 2001-2003	Succeeded by K. S. Siva Kumar
Preceded by Daljeet Singh	General officer commanding III Corps; 2005-2006	Succeeded by Manbir Singh Dadwal
Preceded by Gurditar Singh	Deputy Chief of the Army Staff; 2006-2008	Succeeded by Manbir Singh Dadwal
Academic offices
Preceded by P. K. Abdul Aziz	Vice-chancellor of AMU; 2012-2017	Succeeded by Tariq Mansoor
