= Mohommed Ali Shah =

Indian actor

Major Mohommed Ali Shah
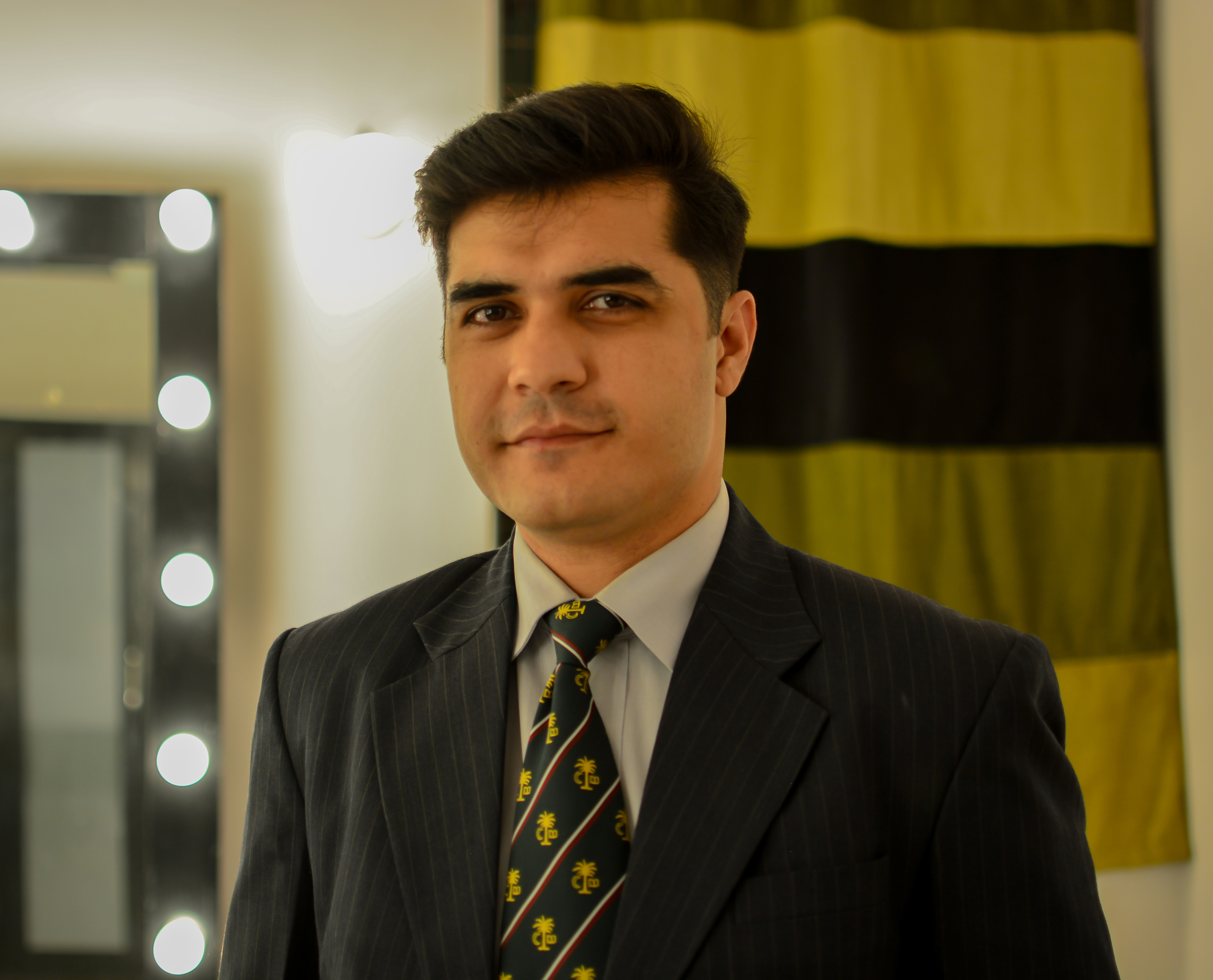
- Pronunciation: [mɔɦəmːəd̪ əliː ʃɑːɦ]
- Born: 23 September 1979 (age 47); Kolkata, West Bengal, India
- Education: The Lawrence School; Officers Training Academy; Indian Institute of Management
- Occupations: Actor; motivational speaker; former army officer
- Years active: 2012–present
- Parent: Zameer Uddin Shah (father)
- Relatives: Shah family
- Awards: Special Jury and Critic's Award as Best Actor in Kerala, organised by the Jaihind TV channel, 2016; Awarded Critic's Best Actor in Australia
- Military career
- Allegiance: India
- Branch: Indian Army
- Service years: 2003–2008
- Rank: Major
- Unit: Regiment of Artillery
- Conflicts: Kashmir conflict Insurgency in Northeast India
- Awards: Commendation Card

Major Mohommed Ali Shah (Note: Hindustani pronunciation: [mɔɦəmːəd̪ əliː ʃɑːɦ].) (Hindustani pronunciation: [mɔɦəmːəd̪ əliː ʃɑːɦ]; born 23 September 1979) is an Indian actor, motivational speaker and former military officer. He is a member of the board of the International Film and Entertainment Festival of Australia who gave him an award.

== Early life ==
Shah was born to Lt. Gen. Zameer Uddin Shah (Retd.). He is the nephew of actor Naseeruddin Shah and cousin of actors Imaad Shah and Vivaan Shah.

His great-great-great-grandfather was the Afghan warlord Jan-Fishan Khan, who would go on to become the Nawab of Sardhana. His relatives include Ikbal Ali Shah, Amina Shah, Omar Ali-Shah and Idries Shah.

== Career ==
=== Military career ===
Mohommed Ali Shah attended the Officers Training Academy, Chennai. Earlier Shah worked at a call centre and then took a commission in the Indian Army as per family tradition. As a young lieutenant, Shah was deployed on the Line of Control in Jammu and Kashmir. He was promoted to captain and was transferred on assignment as the ADC to the General Officer Commanding in the North East. Thereafter, he was promoted to the rank of major while posted with the Assam Rifles. He worked for Doordarshan as a television commentator for the fourth CISM Military World Games held in Hyderabad in 2007. His army service totalled five years.

=== Corporate career ===
After leaving the army, Shah studied marketing at the Indian Institute of Management Calcutta. He has worked for Genpact and Mahindra & Mahindra Ltd.

=== Theatre ===
- The "Major" Actor's Assorted Monologues
- The Inspector General

=== Film career ===
Shah has acted in Sriram Raghavan's Agent Vinod, Vishal Bhardwaj's Haider and Tigmanshu Dhulia's Yaara. He acted in a film based on the life of Majaz Lucknawi and played a character on the Doordarshan National television series, Dil Aashna Hai. He has featured in an advertisement and won the "Best Actor" award for an English film at the 4th Delhi International Film Festival.

== Filmography ==
Key
†	Denotes films that have not yet been released

Year	Film	Role	Notes
2012	Agent Vinod	Police Inspector	
2014	Haider	Army Major	
2015	The Great Indian Tamasha	ATS Chief 'Abbas Ahmed'	Screened at 4th Delhi International Film Festival
2015	The Ruffian	Ruffian	
2015	Bajrangi Bhaijaan	Prison Officer	
2016	Majaz- Ae Gham-e-Dil Kya Karun	Akhter Imam	
2017	Vodka Diaries†	Sam	
2017	Raagdesh	-	
2017	Bhoga Khidikee	-	Assamese film
2019	The Tashkent Files	Ruling Party President	Deleted scene
2020	Yaara	Jasjit Singh	Released on ZEE5

== Honours and awards ==
=== Film Awards ===
Year	Category	Film	Result
2016	Special Jury and Critic's award for Best Actor in Kerala, organised by the Jaihind TV channel on 8 August 2016	-	Won
2016	Awarded Critic's Best Actor" in Australia	-	Won

== Personal life ==
In 2012, Shah helped campaign against a private airline's alleged gross misconduct to prove a point that customers are aware of their rights.
