= Jan-Fishan Khan =

Afghan noble chieftain

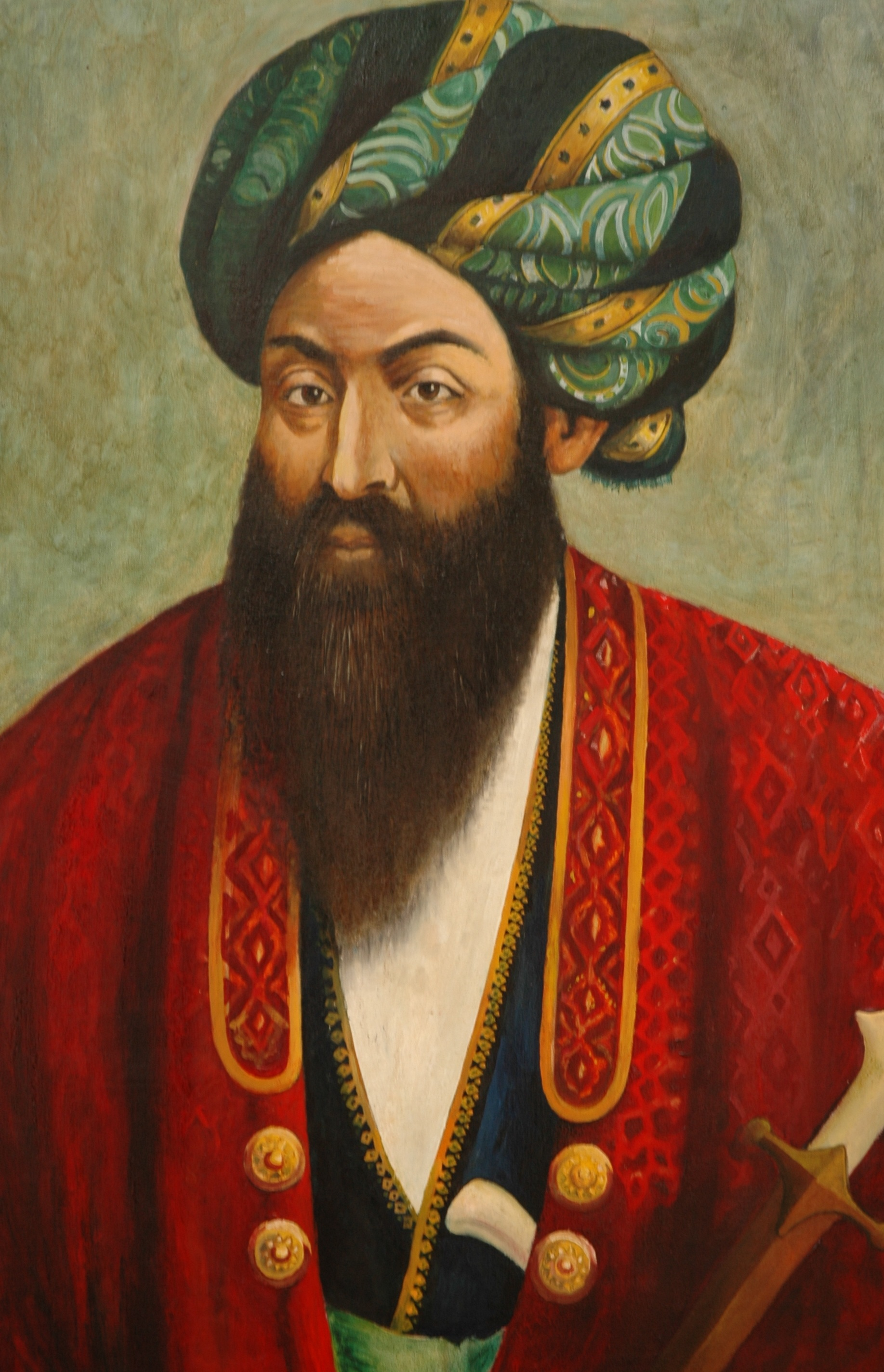
- Born: Paghman, Afghanistan
- Died: 1864; Sardhana, India
- Occupation: Noble chieftain (nawab)
- Children: Nawab Muhammad Ali Shah Sardar Bhadur Mir Khan
- Parent: Saiyed Qutubuddin Khan
- Relatives: Shah family

Saiyed Muhammed Khan, better known by his title as Jan-Fishan Khan, was a 19th-century Afghan noble chieftain (nawab) He participated in the First Anglo-Afghan War (1839–42) and the Indian Rebellion of 1857, and on both occasions, he supported the British. For his services to the British, Khan was granted the estate of Sardhana and is the forefather of the Nawabs of Sardhana.

== Background ==
Jan-Fishan Khan was the son of an Afghan noble, Saiyed Qutubuddin Hashmi, of Paghman, the family's ancestral home in Afghanistan. His family has historically claimed descent from Ali ar-Ridha, the eighth Imam, through Najmuddin Kubra and the Arab Sufi Saiyed Bahaudin Shah.

== Life ==
In the First Anglo-Afghan War, Saiyed Muhammed Khan, also known to the British as the "Laird of Pughman", supported Shah Shuja and the British Army against other Afghan forces, apparently in order to honour a family allegiance to Shah Shuja. In 1840, he was awarded the title "Jan-Fishan Khan" by Shah Shuja for his support.

Lady Florentia Sale established the military action for which Saiyed Muhammad Khan received his title of Jan-Fishan Khan. She wrote the following in her eyewitness account of the First Afghan War titled "A Journal of the Disasters in Affghanistan, 1841-42":

"I observe I have mentioned the Laird of Pughman,--a sobriquet applied to a good man, and a true one to the Shah and us. His proper name was the Syud Mahommed Khan; and for the good service he did in the Kohistan with Sale's force he obtained the honorary title of Jan Fishan Khan,..."

Professor Wheeler M. Thackston, a renowned linguist of Persian, Arabic, Syriac and Chaghatai has stated the following interpretation of the title Jan-Fishan: "The Persian compound jān-fishān (جان‌فشان) means self-sacrificing. Literally it means 'soul-strewing' in the sense that one is willing to 'strew,' or offer, one's life in loyal service. It is a synonym of jān-nisār (جان‌نثار) and jān-sipār (جان‌سپار), which were awarded as titles to Jan-Nisar Khan and Jan-Sipar Khan by Jahangir and Shahjahan."

According to writer James Moore, the title means "The Zealot" (however this is a misunderstanding of the meaning of the Persian idiom which can mean "zealous" in the sense of "ready to sacrifice one's life", as it is defined in Steingass). One of Jan-Fishan Khan's descendants Saira Shah has correctly explained that this nom de guerre translates literally as "scatterer of souls". Shah recounts that the appellation has a double meaning: first, that of a noble chieftain scattering the souls of his enemies, and second, one based on a Sufi couplet describing the supplicant's devotion to God:

If I had a thousand lives
I would scatter them all at your blessed feet.

Having accompanied Sir Robert Sale's force on its march from Kabul to Jalalabad, Jan-Fishan Khan was honourably mentioned in dispatches for his assistance. In the Indian Rebellion of 1857, Jan-Fishan Khan again helped the British to quell the mutiny. Lethbridge (1893) gives the following summary in The Golden Book of India, a genealogical and biographical source:

"At the time of the Mutiny, the head of the family, Saiyed Muhammed Jan Fishan Khan Saheb, took the side of the Government at once. When the Mutiny occurred at Meerut, he raised a body of horse, consisting of his followers and dependents, and officered by himself and his relatives; accompanied General Wilson's force to the Hindan; was present in both actions, and thence to Delhi, where he remained with the headquarters camp until the city was taken, when his men were employed to keep order in Delhi.

Exiled from Kabul ever since the British retreat from Afghanistan, Jan-Fishan Khan eventually came to settle in Sardhana, a town near Meerut in the North-Indian state of Uttar Pradesh, and was given the hereditary title of Nawab of Sardhana in recognition of his services. He had lost several of his sons in the fighting.

== The Sardhana estate ==
According to the Imperial Gazetteer of India (1908): On account of services rendered to Sir Alexander Burnes in his Kabul mission, and subsequently to the British in the retreat from Kabul, a pension of Rs. 1,000 a month was given to the family, which settled at Sardhana. As a reward for subsequent help to the British in putting down the Indian mutiny, the title of Nawab Bahadur, and confiscated estates assessed at Rs. 10,000 per annum, were conferred on Jan Fishan Khan, with concessions as to the revenue assessed. The pension was also made permanent. During the lifetime of the first Nawab, and for some time after, the family added largely to the estate, but speculations in indigo and personal extravagance caused losses. The estate was taken under the Court of Wards in 1895, and in 1901 the debts, amounting to 1 million (100,000 = 100,000 Rupees), were paid off by a loan from Government.

Tradition has it that the town of Sardhana (population 12,059 in 1891, growing to 12,467 in 1901 and 47,970 by 2001) was founded by a Raja Sarkat, whose family ruled there until their expulsion by the Muslims. Sardhana was once famous as the residence of the Catholic ruler Begum Samru.

== Sufi connection ==
According to his descendant Idries Shah's obituary, as well as being an Afghan noble chieftain, Jan-Fishan Khan was also a Sufi sage.

Statements attributed to Jan-Fishan Khan by Idries Shah in his books on Sufism include: "The candle is not there to illuminate itself", "You may follow one stream. Realize that it leads to the Ocean. Do not mistake the stream for the Ocean" and "The visible places of Sufi study are like lamps in the dark. The inner places are like the Sun in the sky. The lamp illuminates an area for a time. The sun abolishes the dark". Khan also features in several teaching stories and some didactic passages in these books.

== Descendants ==
After Jan-Fishan Khan's death in 1864, his three sons succeeded him as Nawab, the last being Saiyid Ahmad Shah, who succeeded in 1882.

Jan-Fishan Khan has a number of notable descendants, including his great-grandson, the author and diplomat the Sirdar Ikbal Ali Shah who married the author and traveller Saira Elizabeth Luiza Shah; great-great-grandchildren: the authors and Sufi teachers Idries Shah, and Omar Ali-Shah, the storyteller Amina Shah, retired Indian Army general Zameer Uddin Shah and actor Naseeruddin Shah; and great-great-great-grandchildren: the author and filmmaker Tahir Shah, his twin sister Safia Nafisa Shah, who edited the book Afghan Caravan, author, reporter and documentary filmmaker Saira Shah, filmmaker Arif Ali-Shah, who has led Sufi study groups, and Indian actors Mohommed Ali Shah, Imaad Shah and Vivaan Shah.
