= Octagon Press =

Former publishing house in London, England

- Status: Defunct (2014)
- Founded: 1960
- Founder: Idries Shah
- Country of origin: United Kingdom
- Headquarters location: London
- Distribution: Worldwide
- Nonfiction topics: humanities, cultural geography, literature, poetry, folklore, psychology, travel and philosophy
- Official website: Octagon Press (Archived)

Octagon Press was a cross-cultural publishing house based in London, UK. It was founded in 1960 by Sufi teacher, Idries Shah to establish the historical and cultural context for his ideas. The company ceased trading in 2014.

== Description ==
Octagon Press published many of Shah's later works. In addition, the publishing house has produced translations of Sufi classics and titles by other notable authors, focusing on the fields of the humanities, cultural geography, literature, poetry, folklore, psychology, travel and philosophy.

Shah used Octagon Press to increase the availability of information on Afghanistan, aware that there would be a need for such information after the country's recent history. Two of his books, Darkest England (1987) and The Natives are Restless (1988), "traced affinities between the English and Afghan peoples".

For many years Octagon Press sold the academic monographs published by the London Institute for Cultural Research, now sold directly by the ICR. A number of the classical works were published with the aid of the Sufi Trust.

The Octagon Press Limited was registered in the United Kingdom as a limited liability company at Companies House on 10 January 1972.

In 2014, it was stated on the official web site that "The Octagon Press announces that it is to cease from trading in its current form. The works of Idries Shah will henceforth be represented by ISF Publishing, a part of The Idries Shah Foundation. Existing editions of Octagon Press titles will no longer be available. Idries Shah's corpus of work will be relaunched in entirety in new printed and eBook editions."

== Authors ==
- Morag Murray Abdullah, a Scottish travel writer who journeyed through Central Asia.
- Jack L. Bracelin, a biographer. One of the first Octagon titles was the biographical work, Gerald Gardner: Witch. Attributed to Jack L. Bracelin, it was in fact ghost-written by Shah, who was Gardner's secretary at the time of writing.
- Sir Richard Burton, a 19th-century English explorer, translator, writer, soldier, orientalist, ethnologist, linguist, poet, hypnotist, fencer and diplomat.
- Edward Campbell, a Fleet Street journalist and an acknowledged authority on circuses and the training of wild animals, who had a book The People of the Secret published for a time by Octagon, written under the pseudonym "Ernest Scott". The book featured an introduction by the philosopher and prolific novelist Colin Wilson.
- Amir Habibullah, born Bacha Saqao, the son of a poor water-carrier, who eventually became King of Afghanistan. A year after being crowned, he was overthrown and executed. His autobiography, My Life – from Brigand to King, was published by Octagon.
- Doris Lessing, who won the Nobel Prize in Literature in 2007. Memoirs of a Survivor, published in 1974, a novel described by her as 'an attempt at autobiography', was published by Octagon.
- Professor Robert Ornstein, a psychologist, writer, professor at Stanford University, and chairman of the Institute for the Study of Human Knowledge (ISHK).
- Amina Shah, a prominent anthologiser of Sufi stories and folk tales, who was for many years the Chairperson of the London-based College of Storytellers. The Tale of the Four Dervishes has an introduction by Doris Lessing.
- Khalilullah Khalili, Afghanistan's foremost 20th-century poet. The Quatrains of Khalilullah Khalili was published with both Dari and English versions of the text.
- Sirdar Ikbal Ali Shah, an Afghan author, poet, diplomat, scholar, and savant.
- Idries Shah, author of over forty books. His most seminal work was The Sufis, which appeared in 1964 and was well received internationally.
- Tahir Shah, a writer, reviewer, filmmaker and "intrepid traveller". Four of his earlier works, Beyond the Devil's Teeth, In Search of King Solomon's Mines, Sorcerer's Apprentice and The Middle East Bedside Book are published or distributed by Octagon.
- Denise Winn, a British journalist specializing in psychology and medicine, is a former editor of the UK edition of Psychology Today, has written for national newspapers and magazines in Britain for over 20 years, and is author of a dozen books on psychological and medical topics. The Manipulated Mind : Brainwashing, Conditioning and Indoctrination was published by Octagon.

== Classical translations ==
Notable classical Sufi authors in translation include:

- Al-Ghazali: The Alchemy of Happiness
- Nuruddin Jami: Yusuf and Zulaikha
- Jalal ad-Din Rumi: The Teachings of Rumi from The Masnavi. Rumi was a 13th-century Persian poet, Islamic jurist, theologian, and mystic. He "is one of the most widely read poets in the United States".
- Saadi of Shiraz: The Bostan and The Gulistan
- Hakim Sanai: The Walled Garden of Truth
- Mahmud Shabistari: The Secret Garden
- Shah Waliullah of Delhi: The Sacred Knowledge
- The Religion of the Sufis translated from The Dabistan

The compilation Four Sufi Classics contains:

- Al-Ghazali: The Niche for Lights
- Jami: The Abode of Spring
- Jami: Salaman and Absal
- Sanai: The Way of the Seeker

== Reception ==
Idries Shah's books on Sufism have achieved wide critical acclaim. He was the subject of a BBC documentary ("One Pair of Eyes: Dreamwalkers") in 1970, and two of his works (The Way of the Sufi and Reflections) were chosen as "Outstanding Book of the Year" by the BBC's "The Critics" programme. Among other honours, Shah won six first prizes at the UNESCO World Book Year in 1973, and the Islamic scholar James Kritzeck, commenting on Shah's Tales of the Dervishes, said that it was "beautifully translated". At the time of his death, Shah's books had sold over 15 million copies in a dozen languages worldwide.

Nobel Prize–winning author Doris Lessing, who also had work published by Octagon Press, praised Shah's many books and saw him as a "good friend and teacher".

== Relief efforts ==
Idries Shah set up a charitable agency, Afghan Relief which operated from 1984 to 2002. Its aim was to provide medical, educational and other aid to refugees and Shah wrote books to assist in the operation, some of which are published by Octagon. The relief effort was carried out in association with The Institute for the Study of Human Knowledge (ISHK) and their children's imprint, Hoopoe Books. Hoopoe provides books and complementary teaching materials to schools and children in Afghanistan, with official permission from Afghanistan's Minister of Education in Kabul. Hoopoe also provides relief for Pakistan.

The Kite Runner companion curriculum, published by Amnesty International USA contains a list of books recommended for further reading by the Afghanistan Relief Organization (ARO, founded in 1998 and not to be confused with Shah's original Afghan Relief). These recommended books include several works for children by Idries Shah published by Hoopoe, Ikbal Ali Shah's Afghanistan of the Afghans and works by Saira and Safia Shah published by Octagon.

== See also ==
- Publishing
- The Institute for Cultural Research (1965–2013)
- The Idries Shah Foundation (2013 onwards)
