= World Tales =

- First edition (US)
- Author: Idries Shah
- Language: English
- Publisher: Harcourt Brace Jovanovich (US); Octagon Press (UK)
- Publication date: December 25, 1979
- Publication place: United Kingdom
- Media type: Print
- Pages: 410
- ISBN: 0-15-199434-X
- OCLC: 4858129

World Tales, subtitled "The Extraordinary Coincidence of Stories Told in All Times, in All Places" is a book of 65 folk tales collected by Idries Shah from around the world, mostly from literary sources. Some of the tales are very common, others are less well known.

== Content ==
Each story is preceded by a short introduction by the author, giving a brief history of the tale's literary mutations, or remarking on the strange similarities that versions exhibit across great geographical or historical distances. The collection has had a broad appeal. For instance Canadian poet P. K. Page cited it as the book she would give to a child, and author and storyteller Norah Dooley: "This is the book that turned my interest as an adult to folklore and inspired me to take up storytelling." and has become a widely used sourcebook of tales.

Whilst Shah mentions many of the ancient and modern interpretations that have been placed on the tales, along with some of the theories of cross-cultural transmission, he himself interprets them little, writing in the introduction:

Working for thirty-five years among the written and oral sources of our world heritage in tales, one feels a truly living element in them which is startlingly evident when one isolates the 'basic' stories: the ones which tend to have travelled furthest, to have featured in the largest number of classical collections, to have inspired great writers of the past and present.

The value that Shah put on folklore of this kind is clear, not only from the many volumes of tales that he published but also from books published by his children. The title alone of one of his daughter Saira Shah's books, The Storyteller's Daughter, gives some indication, while his son Tahir Shah's book In Arabian Nights, itself an exploration of the power of the folktale, recalls:

When my father died a decade ago, I inherited his library. There were five reinforced boxes of books labeled "STORIES: VALUABLE, HANDLE WITH CARE". Among them were Aesop's Fables, Hans Christian Andersen, and the Brothers Grimm. There were many others too, the Arab collections and volumes of tales from every corner of the world...

== Original illustrated edition ==
The book was first published in large format by Harcourt Brace Jovanovich with each tale illustrated. Originally Shah asked Ivan Tyrrell to find illustrations for the tales by the likes of Arthur Rackham, Kay Nielsen and Edmund Dulac. Tyrrell instead suggested commissioning new work, Shah agreed to this and the idea was put to, and approved by, the publisher, William Jovanovich. Thirty seven artists contributed. This edition is no longer in print; the Octagon Press edition is text only.

Agnes Perkins, writing in the Children's Literature Association Quarterly cited this "lavish" edition of World Tales as an example of books that bridge the gap between illustrated books of folktales published for the juvenile market which pay little attention to sources or to authenticity of tone and language and which supply none of the working tools developed for folklore scholarship which might lead readers to further study of tales from the oral tradition, and collections by folklorists concerned primarily with local variants and the unusual persistence of motifs which ignore questions of the value of the stories from a literary standpoint.

== Examples of stories ==
Title	Origin	The tale	Illustrator in large format edition
Tales of a Parrot	India	From Parrot Tales (the Persian Tutinama by Nakhshabi), split into three linked tales. Shah's version is taken from an oral narrative collected by the great Italian folklorist Giuseppe Pitrè, though the telling seems to link to a Sanskrit source, the Śukasaptati.	Sue Porter
Dick Whittington	England	The familiar pantomime story of Richard Whittington	Ken Laidlaw
Don't Count Your Chickens	Spain	The fable behind the proverb, one of many variants of the fable The milkmaid and her pail	James Marsh
The Hawk and the Nightingale	Greece	Recorded by Hesiod in his Works and Days. Regarded by many as the earliest fable attributable to a literary work: "The poem also contains the earliest known fable in Greek literature" number 4 in the Perry Index.	Ray Winder
Cecino the Tiny	Tuscany	A variant of Tom Thumb	Chris McEwen
Her Lover's Heart	India	The ancient story of Raja Rasalu.	David O'Connor
The New Hand	USA	Similar to the Brothers Grimm's The Old Man Made Young Again and to unofficial legends of Jesus current in Palestine, this one takes place in Alabama.	Mai Watts
The Mastermaid	Norway	From Norwegian Folktales collected by Peter Christen Asbjørnsen and Jørgen Moe, translated by George Webbe Dasent.	Peter Richardson
The Ass in Pantherskin	India	Originates with the Panchatantra, dating at the latest form 500 A.D. and perhaps as old as 100 B.C.	Philip Argent

== List of stories ==
- Tales of a Parrot, illustrated by Sue Porter
- Dick Whittington, illustrated by Ken Laidlaw
- Don't Count Your chickens, illustrated by James Marsh
- The Hawk and the Nightingale, illustrated by Ray Winder
- Cenino the Tiny
- Her Lover's Heart
- The New Hand
- The Mastermaid
- The Hermit
- The Maiden Wiser than the Tsar
- The Travelling Companion
- The Riddles
- The Grateful Animals and the Ungrateful Man
- The Value of a Treasure Hoard
- Patient Griselda
- How Evil Produces Evil
- The Ghoul and the Youth of Ispahan
- The Pilgrim from Paradise
- The Blind Ones & the Matter of the Elephant
- Anpu and Bata
- God Is Stronger
- The Happiest Man in the World
- The Gorgon's Head
- The Brahmin's Wife and the Mongoose
- The Magic Bag
- Catherine's Fate
- The Desolate Island
- Gazelle Horn
- Tom Tit Tot
- The Silent Couple
- Childe Rowland
- The Tale of Mushkil Gusha
- The Food of Paradise
- The Lamb with the Golden Fleece
- The Man with the Wen
- The Skilful Brothers
- The Algonquin Cinderella
- The Kindly Ghost
- The Ass in Panther Skin
- The Water of Life
- The Serpent
- The Wonderful Lamp
- Who Was the Most Generous?
- Cupid and Psyche
- The Royal Detectives
- Conflict of the Magicians
- False Witnesses
- The Cobbler who Became an Astrologer
- The Two Travellers
- The Fisherman and His Wife
- Impossible Judgement
- Hudden and Dudden and Donald O'Neary
- Riquet with the Tuft
- The Lost Camel
- The Beggar and the Gazelle
- The Apple on the Boy's Head
- The Boots of Hunain
- The Three Caskets
- The Land Where Time Stood Still
- The Man Turned into a Mule
- The Fox and the Hedgehog
- The Bird Maiden
- The Slowest May Win the Race
- The Three Imposters
- Occasion

== Reviews ==
- Alther, Lisa (21 Oct 1979). "Tales From All Over". The New York Times. Archived from the original on 21 September 2018.

== See also ==
- The Idries Shah Foundation
