= The Sarkari Mussalman =

Autobiography of Zameer Uddin Shah

- first edition
- Author: Zameer Uddin Shah
- Genre: Autobiography
- Publisher: Konark Publishers Pvt. Ltd
- Publication date: 2018
- Media type: Print (Paperback)

The Sarkari Mussalman (2018) is an autobiography of Lt Gen Zameer Uddin Shah, an Army Officer who belied in community apprehensions retired as the Deputy Chief of Army Staff. During his tenure as Vice Chancellor, Aligarh Muslim University was propelled to the top spot, amongst Indian Universities, in International University Rankings.

== Translations ==
The autobiography published in English.

== Structure ==
The Sarkari Mussalman unfolds the story of Zameer Uddin Shah, who is a retired Lieutenant General of the Indian Army. He last served as the Deputy Chief of Army Staff (Personnel & Systems) Indian Army. After retirement, he served for some time as an administrative member on the bench of the Armed Forces Tribunal. He was the Vice-Chancellor of Aligarh Muslim University.
