= The Idries Shah Foundation =

UK Sufi charity & publisher (2012-)

- Official logo
- Formation: 18 February 2013
- Founder: The family of the late Idries Shah: Saira Shah, Safia Shah and Tahir Shah
- Registration no.: 1150876 (Charity Commission for England and Wales)
- Legal status: Registered charity
- Purpose: Study, promotion and dissemination of Sufi arts, literature, culture and heritage
- Location: London, England
- Region served: United Kingdom, Afghanistan and other Eastern countries
- Services: ISF Publishing: Book publishing
- Chief executive officer: Tarquin Hall
- Website: idriesshahfoundation.org

The Idries Shah Foundation (ISF) is an independent educational and cultural charity, set up by the family of the late thinker, writer, and teacher in the Sufi mystical tradition, Idries Shah, who wrote over three dozen books on topics ranging from psychology and spirituality to travelogues and culture studies.

Based in London, England, the charity is primarily for the study, dissemination of knowledge, and promotion of Sufi arts, literature, culture and heritage, with special focus on the published works of Idries Shah.

Printed books, ebooks and audiobooks are being made available by the foundation's publishing arm, ISF Publishing.

== Objective ==
The charity's stated objective is “to promote tolerance and cultural understanding by the dissemination of contemporary Sufi ideas as widely as possible throughout the world.” It aims “to translate the works of Idries Shah into Eastern languages in order to help preserve Sufi ideas and values within the Islamic world, where they originated.”

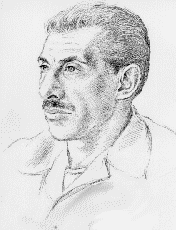
Idries Shah

Between 2015 and 2020, the foundation's publishing arm, ISF Publishing, plans to republish the complete corpus of Idries Shah in English. This includes print, eBook, and audio editions and, for the first time, American editions as well. The foundation is also working on releasing translations of Shah's publications in Oriental languages (including Arabic, Dari, Pashto, Urdu and Turkish). Translations into other Oriental and European languages are also underfoot. In addition, the foundation is committed to establishing an online archive of Idries Shah's manuscripts and associated material, as well as making Shah's publications available to libraries, schools and universities, in both East and West.

The Idries Shah Foundation supersedes the earlier educational charity, The Institute for Cultural Research (ICR), which was originally set up by Idries Shah; and ISF Publishing supersedes his earlier educational book publishing company, Octagon Press.

Operating in the United Kingdom and in Afghanistan, The Idries Shah Foundation's registered charity number in England and Wales is 1150876.

== Officers ==
Writer and journalist, Tarquin Hall was chief executive officer (CEO) of The Idries Shah Foundation for some time. With the successful completion of the re-publication of all of Idries Shah's books, and a streamlining of the charity's operations to ensure its long-term viability, Hall stepped-down as CEO in May 2024.

== Children's Books for Afghanistan Project ==
The main goal of the Institute's Children's Books for Afghanistan Project is to provide free illustrated editions of stories by Idries Shah in full colour to children in Afghanistan. Funds raised from the sale of the limited edition titles will be directed towards this project. Using the model that was established by the Institute for the Study of Human Knowledge's American charity, Hoopoe Books, the Institute is developing this series of its own children's books, and has received funding to produce them.

== History ==
The Idries Shah Foundation was registered as a British charity on 18 February 2013. The founding trustees were Clare Maxwell-Hudson, Gillian Whitworth and Dr. Riad Kocache. (Clare Maxwell-Hudson and Gillian Whitworth had been involved in ICR). While involved in ISF, Idries Shah's three children – Saira Shah, Safia Shah and Tahir Shah – are not trustees. As owners of Shah's copyrights there would be a possible conflict of interest.

2014 marked the fiftieth anniversary of the publication of Idries Shah's first book on Sufism, The Sufis, which award-winning author Doris Lessing, writing in The Washington Post, describes as “a seminal book of the century, even a watershed.” New paperback and ebook editions of the work were published that year by the newly formed ISF Publishing, in association with The Idries Shah Foundation, to coincide with that event.

Part of a wider initiative, The Idries Shah Foundation had begun to make available new paperback, ebook and audiobook editions of Shah's 35 or so main titles in English, along with translations into other Western and Eastern languages. In addition, as Idries Shah's books are re-published, they are being made available to read online – via the foundation's web site and also Google Books – free of charge.

In 2014, The Idries Shah Foundation in partnership with Books With Wings also freely distributed 32,000 books by Idries Shah, together with related Eastern classics, to schools, universities and public libraries in Afghanistan.

=== UNESCO World Tales Short Story Competition ===
In January 2020, a World Tales Short Story Competition was announced by UNESCO in collaboration with The Idries Shah Foundation, in which "young teenagers from all over the globe are invited to write about challenges of today and tomorrow in the format of a short story, and share their perspectives."

== Reception ==
=== Fiftieth anniversary of The Sufis (1964–2014) ===
In an article on the Al Jazeera web site in 2014, to coincide with the fiftieth anniversary of the first publication of The Sufis, John Bell and John Zada write about the wave of intolerant militance and extremism in the East and in Africa and about the destruction of many cultural resources such as libraries and UNESCO World Heritage shrines and mosques in places like Timbuktu.

Explaining the historical, rich and diverse background of the tolerant Sufi tradition, the authors suggest that the material in Shah's newly republished book The Sufis provides a useful and most-timely counterpoint and antidote to such extremism in the East; to consumerism in the West; and to intolerance, dogmatism and closed thinking, which they and Shah see as material, mental and emotional “prisons”.

In a related article in The Guardian, author Jason Webster is also of the opinion that the Sufi Way, as it is known, is a natural antidote to fanaticism.

Webster states that classical Islamic Sufis include (amongst many others) the poet and Persian polymath Omar Khayyám, the Andalusian polymath Avërroes, the Persian poet and hagiographer Fariduddin Attar, and the Persian poet and theologian Jalāl ad-Dīn Rumi. The writer also notes that when The Sufis first appeared, The Washington Post declared the book “a seminal book of the century”, and that the work attracted writers such as Doris Lessing, J. D. Salinger and Geoffrey Grigson. The poet Ted Hughes also described it as “astonishing” and wrote that “The Sufis must be the biggest society of sensible men on Earth.” According to the reviewer, others in the West drawn to or influenced by Sufism include St Francis of Assisi, the novelist, poet and playwright Miguel de Cervantes, the poet and diplomat Sir Richard Burton, the leading British politician Winston Churchill, and the diplomat and economist Dag Hammarskjöld.

Stressing the importance of the Foundation's undertaking, Webster writes that “Half a century on, the foundation’s mission to promote Shah’s ideas in the Middle East fits with the ancient Sufi concern of passing knowledge between different cultures, particularly at times of greatest need. To a certain degree, the classics – what Shah drew on to bring Sufism to the west – are being overlooked by younger generations.”

In another related article on the Asian Affairs journal weblog, author Robert Twigger writes of it being fifty years since the original publication of The Sufis. He notes that the introduction by popular poet, novelist, critic and classicist, Robert Graves helped get the book noticed, and Shah had the support of American psychologist Robert Ornstein and award-winning author Doris Lessing. More recently, historian William Dalrymple has also expressed his debt to Shah's works, as has The Guardian columnist and author Oliver Burkeman.

Twigger writes that though Shah died in 1996, The Idries Shah Foundation carries the work on. He is of the opinion that “ironically, the original material Shah brought from the Oriental world has been persecuted to extinction in many regions of the East,” and adds that “the shock troops of ISIS will one day depart and folk will need re-introducing to their cultural inheritance.”
