= Amina Shah =

Author, poet, storyteller (1918–2014)

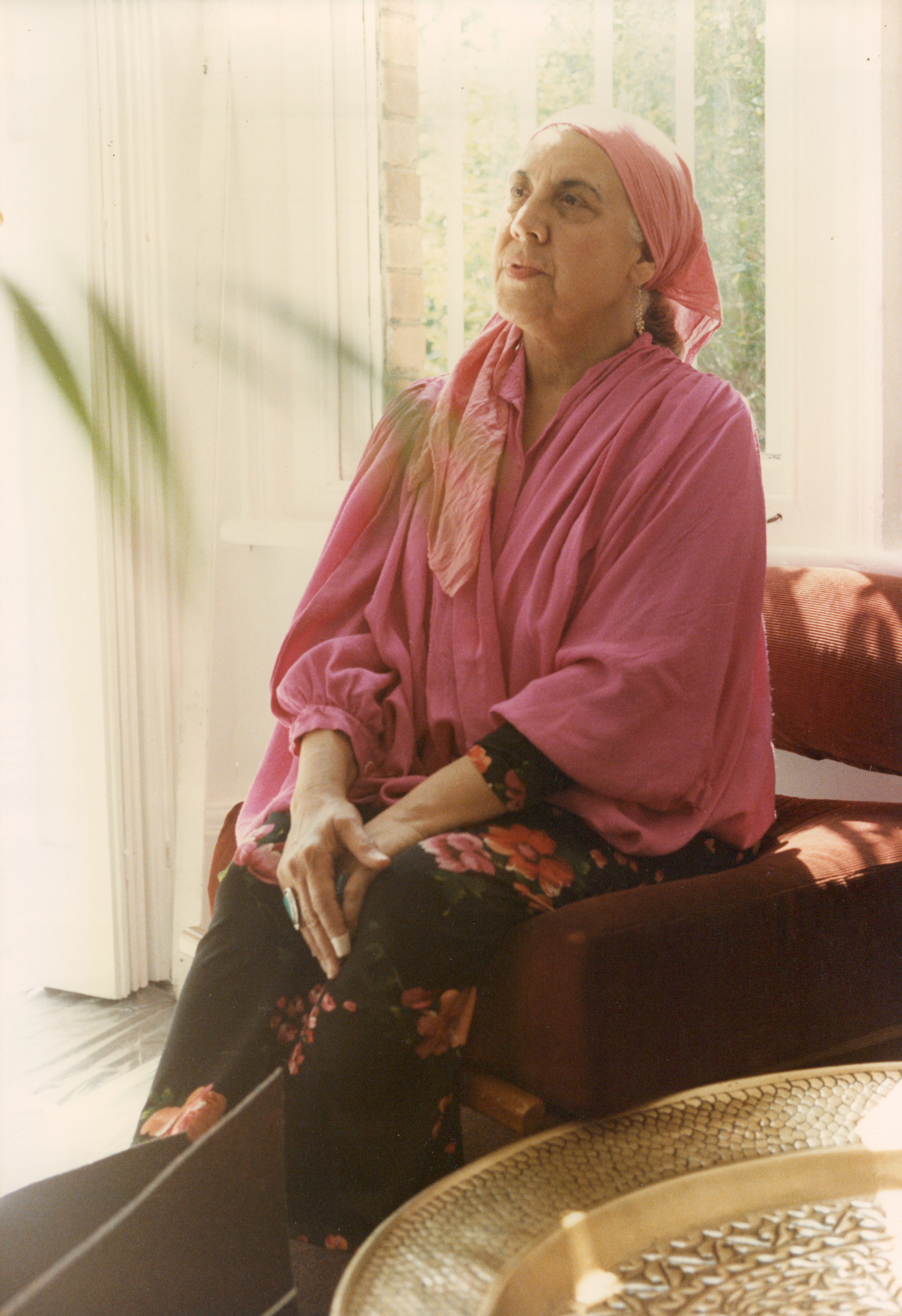
- Born: 31 October 1918; Edinburgh, Scotland
- Died: 19 January 2014 (aged 95); Golders Green, London, England
- Occupations: Author, poet, storyteller
- Relatives: Shah family
- Writing career
- Subjects: Storytelling, travel, exploration, Arab World, cross-cultural studies

Amina Maxwell-Hudson (born Amina Shah; 31 October 1918 – 19 January 2014) was a British anthologiser of Sufi stories and folk tales, and was for many years the Chairperson of the College of Storytellers. She was the sister of the Sufi writers Idries Shah and Omar Ali-Shah, and the daughter of Sirdar Ikbal Ali Shah and Saira Elizabeth Luiza Shah, a Scottish woman. Her nephew is the travel writer and documentary filmmaker Tahir Shah; her nieces are Safia Shah and the writer and documentary filmmaker Saira Shah.

== Family origins and life ==
Shah was born into a distinguished family of Saadat (= Arabic plural of Sayyid) who had their ancestral home at Paghman, not far from Kabul. Her paternal grandfather, Sayyid Amjad Ali Shah, was the nawab of Sardhana, in the North-Indian state of Uttar Pradesh. The principality was awarded to his ancestor Jan-Fishan Khan during the British Raj, and had been ruled formerly by the Kashmiri-born warrior-princess, the Begum Samru.

Her career as a folklorist and author spanned seventy years. In that time she travelled widely, collecting stories and studying folklore. Her travels took her through Africa and the Middle East, through the jungles of Sarawak, across the Australian Outback, Afghanistan, and beyond.

Doris Lessing, who became a student of Idries Shah's Sufism in the 1960s, championed the Shah family's efforts to disseminate such teaching stories in the West, and penned an introduction for Amina Shah's The Tale of the Four Dervishes.

Amina Shah married and became Amina Maxwell-Hudson. She died at Golders Green, London on 19 January 2014 at the age of 95.

== Books ==
- Tiger of the Frontier (1938) (as A.A.Shah)
- Folk Tales of Central Asia (1970)
- The Tale of the Four Dervishes (1979)
- The Assemblies of Al-Hariri (1980)
- Tales of Afghanistan (1982)
- Arabian Fairy Tales (1989)
- Tales From the Bazaars (2002), re-published as Tales from the Bazaars of Arabia: Folk Stories from the Middle East (2009)
