= L. F. Rushbrook Williams =

British historian and civil servant

Laurence Frederic Rushbrook Williams, CBE, FRSA (1890–1978) was a British historian and civil servant who spent part of his working life in India, and had an abiding interest in Eastern culture.

== Life and work ==
Williams was an Examination Fellow of All Souls' College, Oxford, between 1914 and 1921. He built up a school of Mughal studies at the University of Allahabad, where he worked as professor of Modern Indian History between 1914 and 1920. He was appointed director of the Central Bureau of Public Information in 1920. Among other duties he was responsible for compiling annual reports on India submitted to parliament. He left government service to work as the foreign minister for the princely state of Patiala in 1925. This role resulted in advisory work for the princely states in discussions about the federal aspects of the 1935 Government of India Act. After the Round Table conferences Williams returned to India in the employment of Jam Ranjitsinjhi of Navanagar state. He returned to London in 1937, and joined the Ministry of Information in 1939. He was briefly Eastern Services Director of the BBC, before joining the editorial staff of The Times (London) in 1944, where he stayed until his retirement in 1955. He acted as a government advisor on Middle East and Asian affairs, and contributed to publications like the Royal Central Asian Society Journal and the Encyclopædia Britannica.

Williams wrote on a range of topics, which included several books on India, Asia and the Middle East. He became interested in Sufism through his contact with Sirdar Ikbal Ali Shah and late in his retirement edited an anthology of contributions to a symposium in honour of the work of the noted Sufi author, Idries Shah.

== Selected Works ==
- History of the Abbey of St. Alban. Longmans, Green & Co. 1917.
- An Empire Builder of the Sixteenth Century: A Summary Account of the Political Career of Zahir-Ud-Din Muhammad, Surnamed Babur. Longmans, Green & Co. 1918.
- The Cultural Significance of the Indian States. Humphrey Milford. 1930.
- What About India? Thomas Nelson. 1938.
- India. Oxford Pamphlets on World Affairs, No. 32. Oxford University Press. 1940.
- The State of Israel. Faber and Faber. 1957
- The black hills: Kutch in history and legend: a study in Indian local loyalties. Weidenfeld & Nicolson, 1958.
- Handbook for Travellers in India, Pakistan and Nepal
- The State of Pakistan. Faber and Faber. 1962.
- The East Pakistan tragedy. Tom Stacey. 1972.
- Sufi Studies: East and West. Penguin, 1983.
- Pakistan Under Challenge. Tom Stacey. 1975.
- Great Men of India
- Inside Both Indias, 1914-1938: Working in British India and the Princely States with men and women who were laying the foundations of the India, Pakistan, and Bangladesh of today. No date. Privately printed book.
- Ethnic diversity in India. Anmol. 1985.
