= Saira Elizabeth Luiza Shah =

Scottish writer

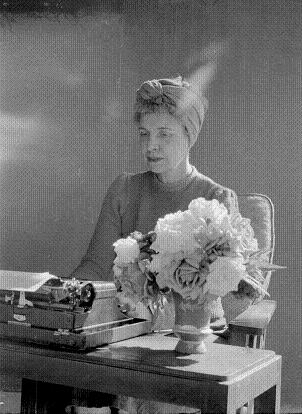
- Born: Bessie Louise MacKenzie; 14 October 1892; Colmonell, Ayrshire, Scotland
- Died: 15 August 1960 (aged 67–68); Hampstead, London, England
- Other name: Morag Murray Abdullah
- Occupations: Writer, traveller
- Spouse: Sirdar Ikbal Ali Shah
- Children: Amina Shah, Omar Ali Shah, Idries Shah, Osman I.H. Shah
- Parent(s): Charles Mackenzie; Bessie Margaret Bloxham

Saira Elizabeth Luiza Shah (née Bessie Louise MacKenzie (14 October 1892– 15 August 1960) was a Scottish writer who wrote under the pen name Morag Murray Abdullah. She met the author, poet, diplomat, scholar, and savant Sirdar Ikbal Ali Shah and wrote fictional accounts of her marriage and travels in the North-West Frontier Province of British India and the mountains of Afghanistan.

== Life and work ==
Bessie Louise Mackenzie– later Saira Elizabeth Luiza Shah – was born in Colmonell, Ayrshire. Her father, Charles MacKenzie, was a gamekeeper on the estate of Hugh Hamilton. Her mother, née Bessie Margaret Bloxham, had been in domestic service to the Hamilton family. Bessie went to school first at Assel Primary School, Girvan Parish, and aged 13 moved to Pinwherry Public School. Her future husband, Sirdar Ikbal Ali Shah, was descended from the Sadaat of Paghman. During World War 1 Bessie met him in Edinburgh, where he was studying medicine at Edinburgh Medical School. Overcoming the resistance of both their families, they married, and travelled a great deal, including some brief visits to India. They had four children, the Sufi writers and translators Amina Shah (b. 1918), Omar Ali-Shah (b. 1922) and Idries Shah (b. 1924), and Osman Ian H Shah (b. 1929).

Writing under the pseudonym of "Morag Murray Abdullah", her first book, entitled My Khyber Marriage: Experiences of a Scotswoman as the Wife of a Pathan Chieftain's Son was described as an autobiography of meeting her husband, falling in love and leaving behind her family and her safe middle-class Scottish family life, to travel to the war-torn North-West Frontier Province of British India and her chieftain husband's ancestral homeland in the high mountains of the Hindu Kush in Afghanistan. It described a Protestant woman learning and adapting to a Muslim culture, laws and rigid codes of honour. The author depicted a journey from the predictable into the unknown. This account was described by Saira Shah, one of her grand-daughters, as a 'lightly fictionalized' account. Evidence cited by Nile Green suggests that some key elements in the book – such as whether her parents-in-law lived near the Khyber Pass on the border with Afghanistan, rather than in the plains just north of Delhi – are not supported by available evidence of her travels.

Her second book, Valley of the Giant Buddhas, was a travelogue describing a journey from Cairo through Arabia to Afghanistan when the author accompanied her husband on diplomatic missions and journeys. It was published in 1993 as a first edition, some 30 years after the author's death. The final chapters describe life in the valleys and remote mountain regions. The statues referred to in the book are the Buddhas of Bamyan which were blown up by the Taliban. The Weekend Telegraph described the work as "a book for connoisseurs of the unexpected."

She also wrote a paper, "The Kaif System", in New Research on Current Philosophical Systems, London: Octagon Press, (1968).

Saira Elizabeth Luiza Shah died on 15 August 1960, in Hampstead, London. Her grave is marked by a tombstone in the Muslim section of the cemetery at Brookwood, Woking, Surrey, England. Her husband died on 4 November 1969 in Tangier, Morocco, as the result of a motor accident.
