= Ikbal Ali Shah =

Indian-Afghan author and diplomat

Sirdar Ikbal Ali Shah
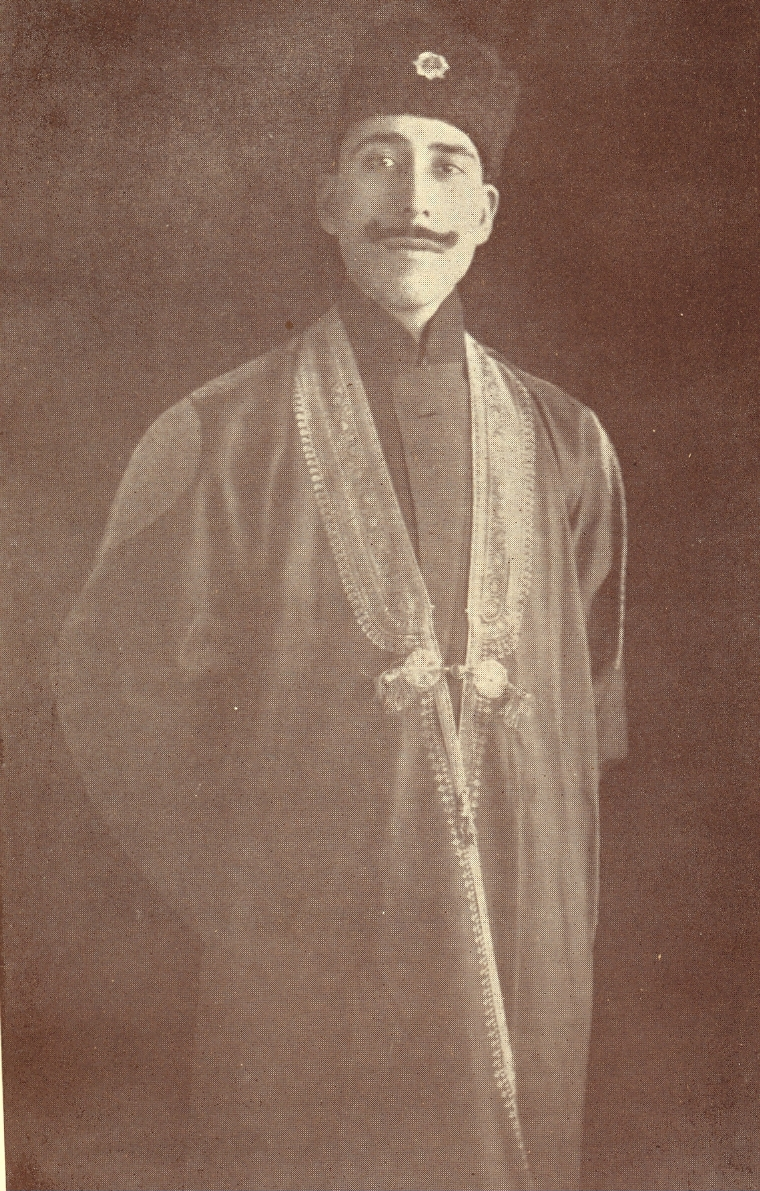
- From Afghanistan of the Afghans
- Born: 12 July 1894; Sardhana, India
- Died: 4 November 1969 (aged 75); Tangier, Morocco
- Occupations: Author, diplomat, savant
- Spouse: Saira Elizabeth Luiza Shah
- Children: Amina Shah, Omar Ali-Shah, Idries Shah
- Relatives: Bibi Mehmooda Begum (sister), Shah family
- Writing career
- Pen name: John Grant, Rustam Khan-Urf, Sheikh Ahmed Abdullah, Sheik A. Abdullah, Syed Iqbal, Bahloal Dana, Ibn Amjed
- Subjects: Travel, exploration, Arab World, cross-cultural studies

Sirdar Ikbal Ali Shah (Hindi: सरदार इक़बाल अली शाह, Urdu: سردار اقبال علی شاہ; 1894 in Sardhana, India – 4 November 1969 in Tangier, Morocco) was an Indian-Afghan author and diplomat descended from the Sadaat of Paghman. Born and educated in India, he came to Britain as a young man to continue his education in Edinburgh, where he married a young Scotswoman.

Travelling widely, Ikbal Ali Shah undertook assignments for the British Foreign Office and became a publicist for a number of Eastern statesmen, penning biographies of Kemal Atatürk, the Aga Khan and others. His other writing includes lighter works such as travel narratives and tales of adventure, as well as more serious works on Sufism, Islam and Asian politics. He hoped that Sufism might "form a bridge between the Western and the Eastern ways of thinking"; familiar with both cultures, much of his life and writing was devoted to furthering greater cross-cultural understanding.

Ikbal Ali Shah had three children, all of whom became notable writers themselves; his son Idries Shah became particularly well known and acclaimed as a writer and teacher of Sufism in the West. When Ikbal Ali Shah's wife died in 1960, he moved from Britain to Morocco, spending the last decade of his life in Tangier. He died in a road accident in Morocco, aged 75.

== Life ==
=== Family origins ===
Ikbal Ali Shah was born into a family of Musavi Saiyeds (descendants of the Islamic prophet Muhammad through his daughter Fatimah and also through Musa al-Kadhim, the great-great-grandson of Husayn ibn Ali and seventh Imam of the Twelver Shi'a sect of Islam). The family originated from Paghman near Kabul, Afghanistan. In 1840, Ali Shah's great-grandfather was awarded the title Jan-Fishan Khan for his support of Shah Shuja, a puppet ruler installed by the British. In 1841, following the defeat of the British, Jan-Fishan Khan was forced to leave Afghanistan. The British-Indian government rewarded his loyalty with an estate in Sardhana, Uttar Pradesh, which thereafter became the family seat.

Ali Shah's granddaughter Saira Shah relates that her grandfather "maintained that ancestry was something to try to live up to, not to boast about" and told her that "it is less important who your forebears were than what you yourself become."

=== Education and marriage ===
Ali Shah was educated in Britain before the World War I. He met his future wife Saira Elizabeth Luiza Shah (pseudonym: Morag Murray Abdullah, b. 1900) during the war, while engaged in an unsuccessful attempt to study medicine at Edinburgh Medical School. They eloped while she was only sixteen; her family did not approve of the match, and her father never spoke to her again. Ali Shah's own father, asked to give his consent to the marriage, enquired by telegram "whether she was prepared to become a Muslim and whether she would be able to defend a fortress, if required." She answered yes on both counts; satisfied, he gave his blessing. The young couple subsequently had three children, the Sufi writers and translators Amina Shah (b. 1918), Omar Ali-Shah (b. 1922) and Idries Shah (b. 1924).

=== Traveller, writer, diplomat and publicist ===
In 1918, Ali Shah became only the second Asian to join the Royal Society for Asian Affairs, contributing articles on Islam to the Society's journal. He travelled widely and became a publicist for a variety of Eastern statesmen such as President Kemal Atatürk of Turkey, King Abdullah of Jordan, King Fuad I of Egypt, the Emir Abdul Illah of Iraq and members of the royal family of Afghanistan. He was on friendly terms with both orthodox leaders (like the Rector of Azhar University in Cairo) and reformers (like Kemal Atatürk).

Ali Shah was also a friend of Inayat Khan and involved in an unsuccessful attempt to set up an Islamic branch of the latter's Sufi Movement in London in 1918; after Khan's death, he criticised the Sufi Movement's universalist attitude, writing in Islamic Sufism (1933), "A Sufi must of necessity be a moslem" and adding that Sufism should not be confused with "such non-Islamic movements which due to utter ignorance are styled Sufism".

Ikbal Ali Shah believed that Bolshevism's encroachment on the countries of Central Asia would almost inevitably lead to catastrophic results, and by 1921 was reporting in the Edinburgh Review on the methods of propaganda and political influence used by the Bolshevists in Central Asia and Afghanistan, with its consequences for British rule in India.

He was also associated with the British Foreign Office for several decades. James Moore states that his work for the Foreign Office occasionally raised controversy: in 1929, after Ali Shah "tried to compromise" the British Prime Minister, Ramsay MacDonald, Foreign Office investigations concluded that there "was hardly a word of truth in his writings".

Ali Shah was a passionate advocate of the modernisation of Islam. He viewed this as nothing more and nothing less than a return to genuine Islam, an Islam without a priest class, writing in 1929:

"In the New Dark Age of my faith, from which we have just emerged into the sunny vistas of real religion, a curious politico-religious system had grown; and it is indeed by reason of our forebears having been seen so long under that influence that the average European wonders whether we have not definitely divorced Islam by our modernization. The truth is that the organization of the Doctors of Moslem Law, backed by autocratic Eastern monarchs was the very antithesis of the words of the Koran. In Turkey, for instance, no man was permitted to consult the Holy Book of Islam and seek interpretation for himself; despite the fact that the only reason for which the faithful places his book above every other Revealed Law is that any man can have his cue directly from it. The Prophet himself emphasized this fact repeatedly and thereby meant to destroy the human tendency of priestcraft. This particular teaching was so deep that it was not until many political cross-currents amongst the Moslem States had much weakened the spiritual essence that the clergy at last won the battle which they had fought for at least a thousand years."

Justifying Turkey's modernisation efforts under Kemal Atatürk, Ali Shah condemned what Islam had become in Turkey:

"Even the slightest divergence from the established church was considered the highest crime; and the faithful wandered in and out of the four water-tight compartments of schools of theology completely dazed by the priest-made dogma that neither would reconcile with the early teachings of Islam nor ring true to the advancing humanity of the present age. The clergy made every effort to circumscribe the view of every Moslim and placed the right of interpretation beyond the reach of even the intelligent seeker after truth."

He noted with approval that –

"When ecclesiastics frowned upon women parading the streets in Stamboul, the young men were able to silence the objections by quoting the Koran to prove that the Koran enjoined only modesty and not the cruel practice of closing women in the houses."

In the 1930s he was in Geneva, working in collaboration with the League of Nations supporting disarmament, and attending the European Muslim Congress of 1935, promoting Islamic unity. According to Augy Hayter (a student of Ikbal's son Omar Ali-Shah) the Sirdar's connection with the League of Nations began in its early days when he was working with professor Gilbert Murray and the Agha Khan, and records of his contributions and position as a "respected intellectual" of the time can be found in the Unesco archives in Paris.

Ikbal Ali Shah was also a member of the Royal Geographical Society and the Royal Asiatic Society. By contributing to the work of such organisations, he aimed to bridge the gap between east and west. In 1937, he wrote:

"... since my early days I have striven to interpret the East to the West, and Europe to Asia. Through this, I believe, lies the way of mutual sympathy between the nations; and such can only be accomplished by means of reading the effusions of one another's Great Minds; because if we but endeavour to understand about our fellow men, good will can come as the gentle dawn of peace."

In 1940, the family moved from London to Oxford to escape German bombing. In 1945, Ali Shah and his son Idries travelled to Uruguay as expert advisors on halalled meat questions for the India Office; a scandal resulted, leading the British ambassador to describe him as a "swindler".

=== Latter years ===
Ikbal Ali Shah later taught Sufi "classes" in England, which were the precursors to the Sufi school established by his son, Idries Shah. He was also appointed by Dr. Zakir Husain as India's cultural representative in all of West Asia.

According to his grandson Tahir, Ali Shah was heartbroken when his wife died in 1960, aged 59; feeling unable to continue living in the places in which they had shared their lives, he moved to Tangier in Morocco, a place they had never visited together, and lived there in a small villa close to the seafront. L. F. Rushbrook Williams, a British scholar bound to Ali Shah through a friendship spanning more than half a century, attributes Ali Shah's move to Morocco to a tightening of British residence regulations and says that Ali Shah, never having acquired British domicile, was obliged to leave behind the study centre for Sufism that he had set up in England.

Near the end of his life, Ali Shah was caught up in the controversy surrounding the 1967 publication of a new translation of Omar Khayyam's Rubaiyat by his son Omar Ali-Shah and the English poet Robert Graves. The translation was based on an annotated "crib" made by Omar Ali-Shah, who asserted that it derived from an old manuscript said to have been in the Shah family's possession for 800 years. L. P. Elwell-Sutton, an orientalist at Edinburgh University, expressed his conviction that the story of the ancient family manuscript was false. Graves believed that the disputed manuscript was in the possession of Ikbal Ali Shah, and that he was about to produce it at the time of his death from a road accident, to allay the growing controversy surrounding the translation. However, the manuscript never was produced.

Richard Perceval Graves describes how, in a letter to Robert Graves in 1970, Idries Shah pointed out that "production of the MSS would prove nothing, because there would be no way of telling whether it was original, or whether someone had washed the writing from a piece of ancient parchment, and then applied a new text using inert inks." Shah believed that the critics were "intent only on opposition" and said he agreed with his father, who had been so infuriated by the "hyaenas" that he wanted nothing to do with the controversy. O'Prey (1984) writes that this last point was not entirely true: Ikbal Ali Shah had in fact written to Graves from Morocco, saying the manuscript should be produced; Graves then forwarded the letter to Omar Ali-Shah. Unfortunately, he neglected to take a copy; Omar never received the letter, and Ikbal Ali Shah died a few days later.

The scholarly consensus today is that the "Jan-Fishan Khan" manuscript was a hoax, and that the Graves/Shah translation was in fact based on a study of the sources of FitzGerald's work by Victorian amateur scholar Edward Heron-Allen. The affair did considerable damage to Graves' reputation.

On 4 November 1969, Ikbal Ali Shah was struck by a reversing Coca-Cola truck in Tangier. He was rushed to hospital unconscious, but died a few hours later. He was buried in England next to his wife. On his gravestone, along with his name, there is only the appellation "Al Mutawakkil", which means "the one who resigns himself to the will of the Almighty."

Sirdar Ikbal Ali Shah's obituary in The Times of Saturday, 8 November 1969 stated:

Sirdar Ikbal Ali Shah died on Tuesday in a motor accident in Morocco. He was 75.
The son of The Nawab Amjed Ali Shah of Sardhana, India, he was born in 1894, and educated at the Nawab’s School, at Aligarh, Oxford and Edinburgh.
Between 1928 and 1960 he published in English alone over 20 books on Eastern questions and personages, philosophy and letters. He was a close friend and biographer of Kemal Atatürk, Nadir Shah of Afghanistan, and the late Aga Khan, among others. He had contributed articles to The Times on many occasions. In 1960, the Indian Council for Cultural Relations appointed him Professor on a special cultural mission to the countries of North Africa and West Asia, with headquarters in Morocco. He leaves two sons and a daughter; his heir is Idries Shah.

== Writings ==
In keeping with his theme of interpreting the East to the West, Ikbal Ali Shah authored travel narratives of his adventures in Middle Eastern and Central Asian countries, such as Alone in Arabian Nights (1933), and set up fiction-writing workshops to disseminate Eastern stories and tales in books like Fifty Enthralling Stories of the Mysterious East (1937). He wrote biographies of major leaders in the Islamic World, such as Kemal: Maker of Modern Turkey (1934) and Controlling Minds of Asia (1937), as well as anthropological, historical and political works like Afghanistan of the Afghans (1928), Pakistan: A Plan for India (1944) and Vietnam (1960).

Many of his works were anthologies of literature from the East, such as The Book of Oriental Literature (1937) and Oriental Caravan (1933), while other works sought to elucidate Eastern religious and mystical traditions, with an emphasis on Sufism, as in Spirit of the East (1939), Lights of Asia (1937), and Islamic Sufism (1933). He also authored books specifically on Islam, like Mohammed: The Prophet (1932) and Selections from the Koran (1933). Octagon Press published compilations of his tales and adventures in the books Escape From Central Asia (1980) and The Golden Caravan (1983). The latter two books also include selections from the Sirdar's writings which had previously been published under the names Sheikh Ahmed Abdullah, Rustam Khan-Urf, Bahloal Dana and Ibn Amjed.

Altogether, Ikbal Ali Shah was author of more than fifty books, including:

- Eastern Moonbeams (1918)
- Briton in India (1918)
- Afghanistan of the Afghans (1927)
- Westward to Mecca (1928)
- Eastward to Persia (1930)
- The Golden East (1931)
- Arabia (1931)
- Turkey (with Julius R. van Millingen, 1932)
- Mohamed: The Prophet (1932)
- Selections from the Koran (1933)
- Islamic Sufism (1933)
- Alone in Arabian Nights (1933)
- Oriental Caravan (1933)
- The Golden Pilgrimage (1933)
- The Tragedy of Amanullah (1933)
- The Prince Aga Khan (1933)
- Kemal: Maker of Modern Turkey (1934)
- Lights of Asia (1934)
- Afridi Gold (1934)
- Fuad: King of Egypt (1936)
- Coronation Book of Oriental Literature (1937)
- The Controlling Minds of Asia (1937)
- Modern Afghanistan (1938)
- Nepal: Home of the Gods (1938)
- Golden Treasury of Indian Literature (1938)
- Spirit of the East (1939)
- Pakistan: A Plan for India (1944)
- Occultism: Its theory and practice (1952)
- Viet Nam (1960)
- Escape from Central Asia (1980)
- The Golden Caravan (1983)

According to his grandson Tahir Shah, the Sirdar also published Through the Garden of Allah (1938) under the pseudonym of John Grant. A revised edition entitled Travels in the Unknown East was published by Octagon Press in 1992.

== Sufism ==
According to his long-time friend L. F. Rushbrook Williams, Ikbal Ali Shah believed that the Sufi message "might form a bridge between the Western and the Eastern ways of thinking, and that the methods that [the Sufis] were using to convey it— methods well-tested by centuries of successful practice— would certainly be of interest and might be of value to the Western world in the quest for the best ways of promoting independent thought and the re-examination of accepted values to test their suitability to the needs of modern social organization."

In his book Islamic Sufism, Ikbal Ali Shah stated that he was instructed in the Sufi Way by his father, to whom he referred as "that Fountain of Goodness Hadrat Syedna Nawab Amjed Ali Shah Naqshbandi Paghmani". He said that the Nawab had, in turn, been taught by his father Nawab Mohammed Ali Shah, who is buried in the Delhi shrine of the Naqshbandi Khwaja Baqi Billah (and an extract from whose Nishan-i-Ghaib, Signs of the Unseen, is given in the "Letters and Lectures" section of Idries Shah's The Way of the Sufi). Nawab Mohammed Ali Shah's father was Jan-Fishan Khan, who in turn had been a disciple of the celebrated Naqshbandi master Haji Dost Muhammad Qandhari. Ikbal Ali Shah sets out the remainder of this silsila, from Qandhari backwards to Yaqub Charkhi (the disciple of Bahauddin Naqshband) in Islamic Sufism (where it is described as "The Punjab Tradition").

In addition to his father Ikbal Ali Shah also gives credit, in his introduction to "Islamic Sufism", to 'the earlier discourses of Sheikh al Akbar Hadratna Shah Abdul [sic] Khair Mujaddadi'. Shah Abul Khair Naqshbandi Dihlawi (1855-1922) was the successor of Shah Muhammad Umar Mujaddidi, who in turn was the son of Ahmad Saeed Mujaddidi Fārūqi Dehlavi, the teacher of Haji Dost Qandhari. Abul Khair took over responsibility for the 'Delhi house' - the dargah and burial place of Mirza Mazhar Jan-i-Janaan and Ghulam Ali Dihlawi by the Turkmen Gate of the old city of Delhi - from Haji Dost Qandhari's deputy Rahim Bakhsh Ajmeri, and today it bears his name. It seems most likely that Ikbal Ali Shah attended Abul Khair's assemblies in person, prior to his coming to Edinburgh, thus linking his Sufi teaching (and, by extension, that of his sons) directly into the main line of the Naqshbandiyya Mujaddidiya.

Ikbal Ali Shah introduced this tradition of Sufism in the West, with special reference to the controversial metaphors in Sufi poetry, in an article published in Hibbert Journal (1921–1922) entitled The General Principles of Sufism.

Four consecutive stages of spiritual advancement were indicated there: Nasut—Humanity; Tariqa—the Way; Jabarut (Araff)—Power, and Haqiqa—Truth, corresponding to the four stages in Naqshbandi practice as observed by the Shattari Pir Shah Muhammad Ghawth (died 1563).

These four stages involved the illumination (tajalli) of five centers: Qalb, Ruh, Sirr, Khafi, Ikhfa—Heart, Spirit, Secret, Mysterious and Deeply Hidden.

In his more substantial introduction Islamic Sufism (1933), Ali-Shah includes excerpts from the work of Khaja Khan attributing the discovery of this system (Latayifi Sitta)—with its corresponding colours: yellow (qalb); red (ruh); white (sirr); black (khafi), and green (ikhfa)—to Ahmad Sirhindi, the founder of the Naqshbandi Mujaddidi.

In the preface to Islamic Sufism, the Sirdar presents his views on how and why Sufism can be a way for modern humanity to reconnect with its spiritual heritage. Deploring the current state of the world, he notes that it is in such times that new revivals of spiritual thought often take place, guided by great exemplars who make a significant impact on society. Focusing on Sufism, he points out that the Sufi way is open to all people and that it can be followed in any society while maintaining contact with the world, regardless of the prevailing materialism. The student's work is done through ordinary life in human society: Be in the world, but not of it is the Sufi dictum. The Sufi encourages not only personal refinement, but the uplifting of others as part of working towards a 'universal brotherhood' of humanity."

As examples of practical methods of Sufism which can be of use in the modern world, the Sirdar discusses meditation, the giving of charity, and focusing more on durable truths and realities than on transient and illusory pursuits. He also discusses the relationship between Sufism and the mind-body connection in healing. He asserts that, through Sufism, "our latent forces for good can be increased, as well as our creative productivity."

Islamic Sufism contains Sufi interpretations of Islamic beliefs and practices, explanations of the history and theory of Sufism with reference to similar Western ideas, selections from the work of the great Sufis of the past, like Al-Ghazali, Rumi, al-Hujwiri, Jami, Hafez and others, as well as examples of the thought of contemporary visionaries like Muhammad Iqbal.

In the revised edition of Alone In Arabian Nights, Ikbal Ali Shah had this to say about Sufism:

In contemporary terms, the Sufis can be seen as people who, initially, work against the evils of coercive organized religion and restrictive cults; then try to help expand the understanding of those who are interested: strictly according to the potential of the people and the times... This latter contention is.. unacceptable to the vast majority of people, who cannot feel happy with it at all... because they always need the reassurance of tradition and of the familiar. If they don't know what to reject, they may deify it.

He adds that his travelling was done, in part, to carry out missions connected with Sufism, and he describes his attempts to explain to groups in the East and the West that what they imagined to be Sufism was highly inaccurate. As examples, he points out that, according to Sufi experience, random collections of people, indulgence in most of the popular mystical practices of physical and emotional excitement, and amalgamations of all kinds of Eastern ideas without regard for what is useful under prevailing circumstances, would usually not result in real Sufi developments. These explanations and admonitions, while intriguing to some, were often rejected by groups that felt threatened by them.

Rushbrook Williams affirms that Ikbal Ali Shah's more public work and activities, such as writing travel books and biographies of major figures, was only a byproduct of his determination to study and promote the value of Sufism as a link between Eastern and Western thought.

== Reception ==
Ikbal Ali Shah's writings and work received mixed reviews and responses.

Westward to Mecca (1928) was described by noted Orientalist H.A.R. Gibb in the Journal of the Royal Institute of International Affairs as a "well-spiced Eastern review, featuring Afghan raiders, alchemists, enchanted walls, watery blue-eyed Bolshevists, singing dervishes and mysterious caves, relieved by more common-place political and literary interludes. Is it all true? How like the materially-minded West to ask such questions!"

In 1930, the Aga Khan III penned a foreword to Sirdar Ikbal Ali Shah's book Eastward To Persia, stating that he thought "Sirdar Ikbal Ali Shah's books—and especially this latest book on Persia—should be read by those in the West who want to see the East through Oriental eyes."

In a review in the Journal of the Royal Asiatic Society of Great Britain and Ireland, The Golden East (1931) was criticised for its imperfect command of English, its "tedium heightened by the Sirdar's efforts at wit, by his imaginary yet dull stories of adventure", and for the many incorrect renderings of Persian words.

In his introduction to the 1939 edition of Ikbal Ali Shah's book, Alone In Arabian Nights, Sir Edward Denison Ross stated that while the Sirdar, well known to him for many years, was "tremendously modest about his achievements", he considered him "the greatest contemporary writer and traveller of the East". He referred to the book as "fascinating" and "extraordinary", commenting on its "erudition, scope and range" and declaring that the Sirdar wrote "the most excellently idiomatic English".

Viet Nam (Octagon Press, 1960) fared worse; a reviewer in the Journal of the Royal Institute of International Affairs accused the book of "numerous elementary errors" and questioned whether Ali Shah had ever visited the country he was describing, or had mostly just drawn on official anti-Communist government propaganda. Summing up, the reviewer concluded: "This book is heavily biased, meretricious, frequently inaccurate, and badly written. It cannot be recommended." A review in the 1962 Year Book of World Affairs similarly described the book as "highly confused and unreliable".

The popularity of Idries Shah's work generated renewed interest in his father. Asked about his recently deceased father in a 1970 BBC interview, Idries Shah agreed that Ikbal Ali Shah was "very unusual". Although he did make some enemies, Shah found it remarkable how few they were, given how uncategorizable and unusual he was. People often remarked to Shah that "the trouble is we never quite knew which side your father was on", to which Shah responded, "I'm sure it never occurred to him that he had to be on any side." Shah described him as "rather a mild sort of person in manner and appearance" but capable of behaving like an "unpredictable Oriental" who often did "unexpected" and "surprising" things when it was required by circumstances. He had a wide range of information and activity but much of it was compartmentalized so that few people knew everything, and no biography had ever been written.

Aref Tamer, an Ismaili Syrian author and scholar of Islamic culture, pointed out in 1973 that "Very little has been written about Saiyid Ikbal Ali Shah... not all [historians] have been able to descry the underlying unity, the service of the community, and the view of the ultimate good that was found in him," because outside observers did not have the perspective to see the pattern.

According to Professor L. F. Rushbrook Williams, the editor of a work published in honor of the services to Sufi studies of Ikbal Ali Shah's son Idries, "Sirdar Ikbal and his son [Idries Shah], both in writing and in other ways, were ultimately to show how Sufi thought and action, educational and adaptive as they are, could be of service to contemporary thinking" and he concluded in 1973 that "... whereas Sirdar Ikbal Ali Shah, who pioneered the effective study of Sufi philosophy in the West, found that the time was not quite ripe for his message to be appreciated at its true value, Idries Shah has discovered that in this age of spiritual uncertainty and a dawning reaction against the prevalent materialism, the outlook and practices of Sufism are meeting exactly the needs that so many people are now experiencing."

Edinburgh orientalist L. P. Elwell-Sutton considered many of the claims made in Rushbrook Williams' book on behalf of Ikbal Ali Shah and his son Idries, concerning their representing the Sufi tradition, to be self-serving publicity, filled with "sycophantic phraseology, fawning adulation, and disarming disregard for facts."

Beginning in the 1970s, the Octagon Press, as part of its aim to establish "the historical and cultural context" for Idries Shah's Sufi work, began re-issuing several of Ikbal Ali Shah's books, among them The Book of Oriental Literature in 1976, a 400-page anthology containing extracts from important mystical and secular literature from all over the East, including excerpts from several classical Sufi authors. A review of the reprint in the University of Oklahoma Books Abroad journal wondered why the book had been reprinted, since it no longer appeared to meet contemporary standards; the amount of space given to various national literatures appeared very uneven, the section on Arabia lacked many essential authors, and the section on Japan, consisting of just two pages, failed to give the names of the writers whose poems were featured. As an anthology, it was considered woefully inadequate.

In 1986, James Moore researched Foreign Office records on Ikbal Ali Shah for a paper critical of his son Idries, and claimed to have found that "damaging material on Ikbal abounds throughout FO 371 and FO 395 from 1926 to 1950"; he came to the conclusion that Ikbal Ali Shah had been "charming and personable" but an inveterate teller of tall stories, a condition Moore chose to describe as "Munchhausen's syndrome".

The Contemporary Review, discussing the 1992 re-issue of Alone in Arabian Nights, observed that it stressed "the eternal attitudes to fate, love and death".

More recently, Afghanistan of the Afghans (1927) was included in The Kite Runner Companion Curriculum, published by Amnesty International USA, as part of a list of books recommended for further reading by the Afghanistan Relief Organization. And M. H. Sidky, of Ohio State University in Columbus, Ohio, in Asian Folklore Studies points to Afghanistan of the Afghans as one of the few useful resources on the "Shamanic configuration" in Afghanistan. The book is also currently recommended by the Embassy of Afghanistan in Washington, DC for information about the history and culture of Afghanistan.

== Gallery ==
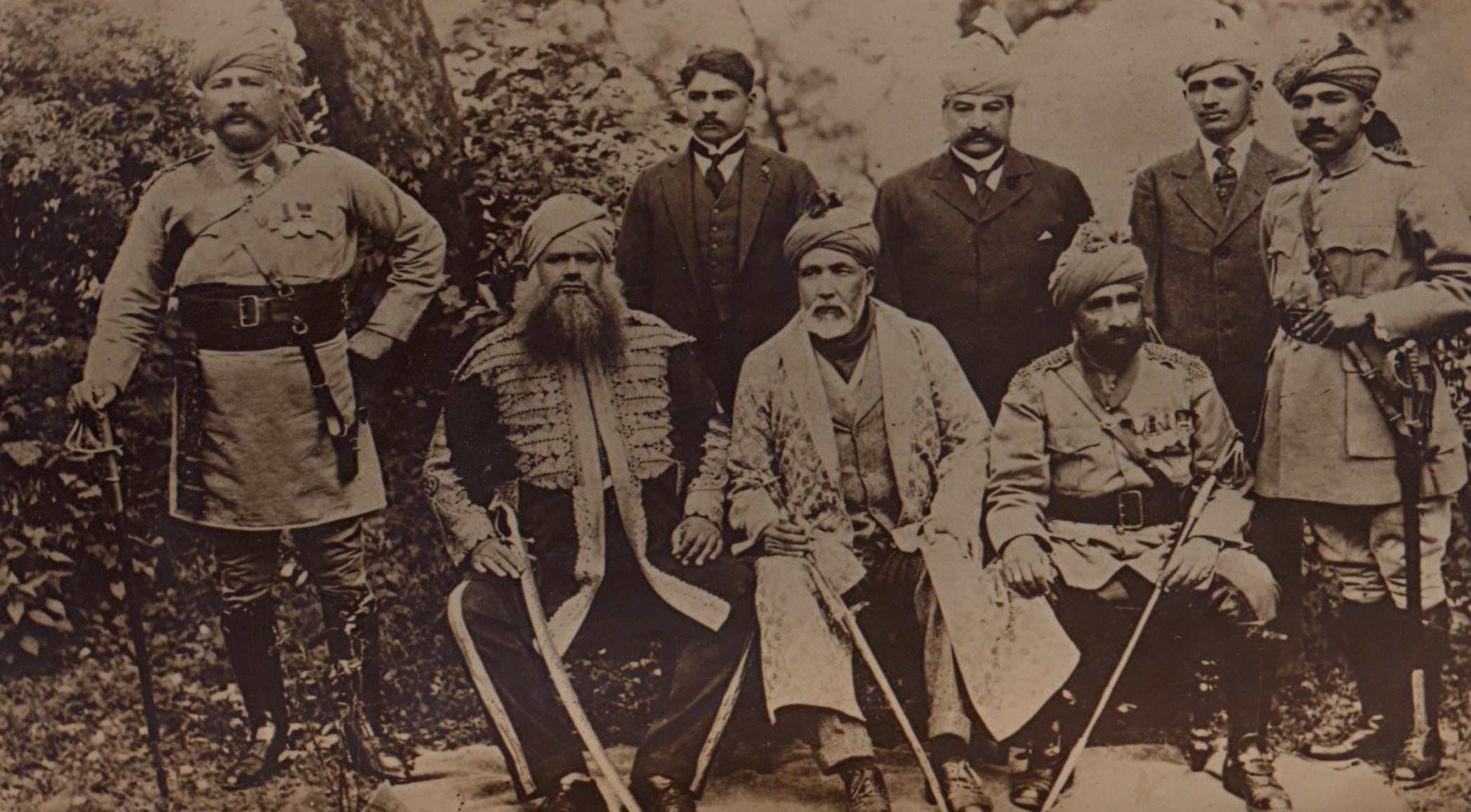
Nawab Amjad Ali Shah (father)

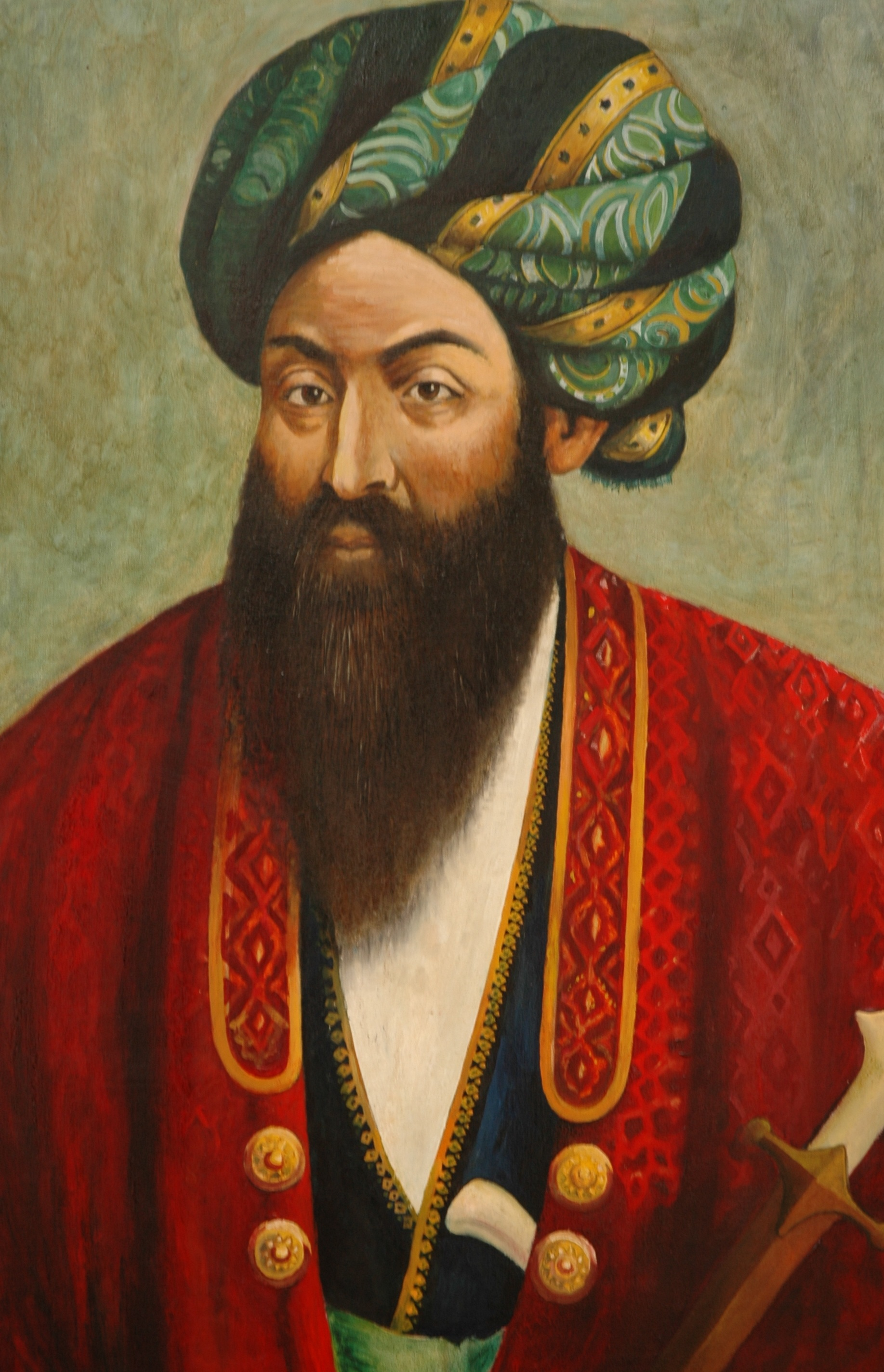
Jan-Fishan Khan (great-grandfather)

== See also ==
- Lataif-e-sitta
- Jan-Fishan Khan (for paternal lineage)
- Qasim Jan
- Sufism
