= Nawab of Sardhana =

Afghan Muslim honorary title

The Nawab of Sardhana is an honorary Muslim title bestowed upon the descendants of the Afghan noble chieftain (nawab) and statesman Jan-Fishan Khan for services to the British Raj – both in the failed British Afghan campaigns, as well as during the 1857 Rebellion in India. The hereditary title was once accompanied by a large jagir at Sardhana, made up largely of ancestral lands which once belonged to the Begum Samru. While these lands have mostly now been dispensed of, the descendants of Jan Fishan Khan retain the right to use the title Nawab of Sardhana.

An account of the awarding of the title, Nawab of Sardhana, was provided by the British colonial scholar Sir Roper Lethbridge, in his The Golden Book of India:

"THE NAWAB OF SARDHANA On account of services rendered to Alexander Barnes in his Kabul mission and subsequently to the English in their retreat from Kabul, they were expelled from Kabul and settled at Sardhana. At the time of the Mutiny, the head of the family, Sayyid Muhammed Jan Fishan Khan Seheb, took the government's side at once. When the Mutiny occurred at Meerut, he raised a body of horse, consisting of his followers and dependents, and officered by himself and his relatives; accompanied General Wilson’s force to the Hindan; was present in both actions, and thence to Delhi, where he remained with the headquarters camp till the city was taken, when his men were employed to keep order in Delhi. For these eminent services, the title of Nawab, with a suitable khilat, was conferred on him. And each of his successors have received the title of Nawab for life on succeeding to the estates."

== Holders of the title Nawab of Sardhana ==
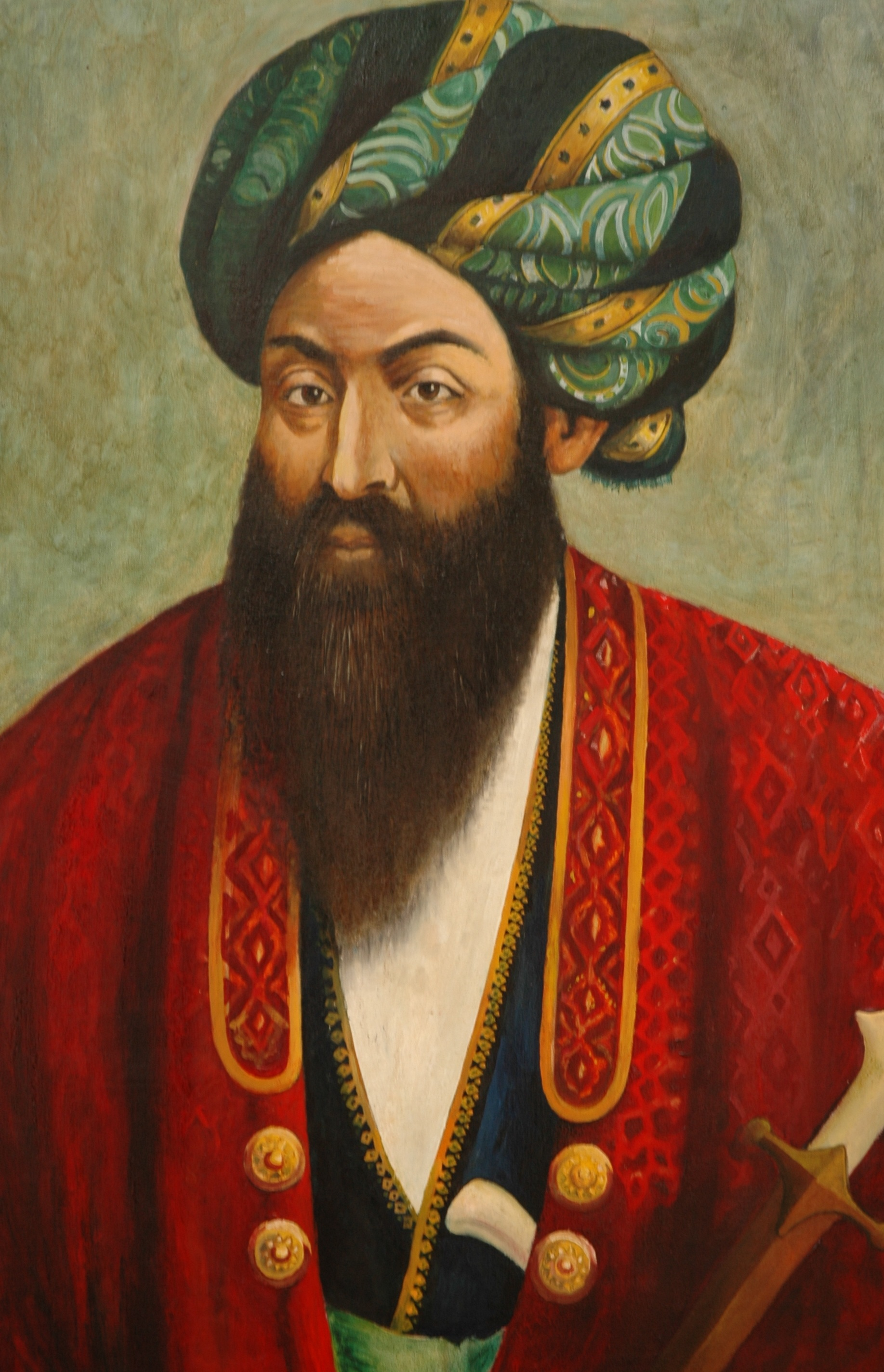
Saiyed Jan-Fishan Khan

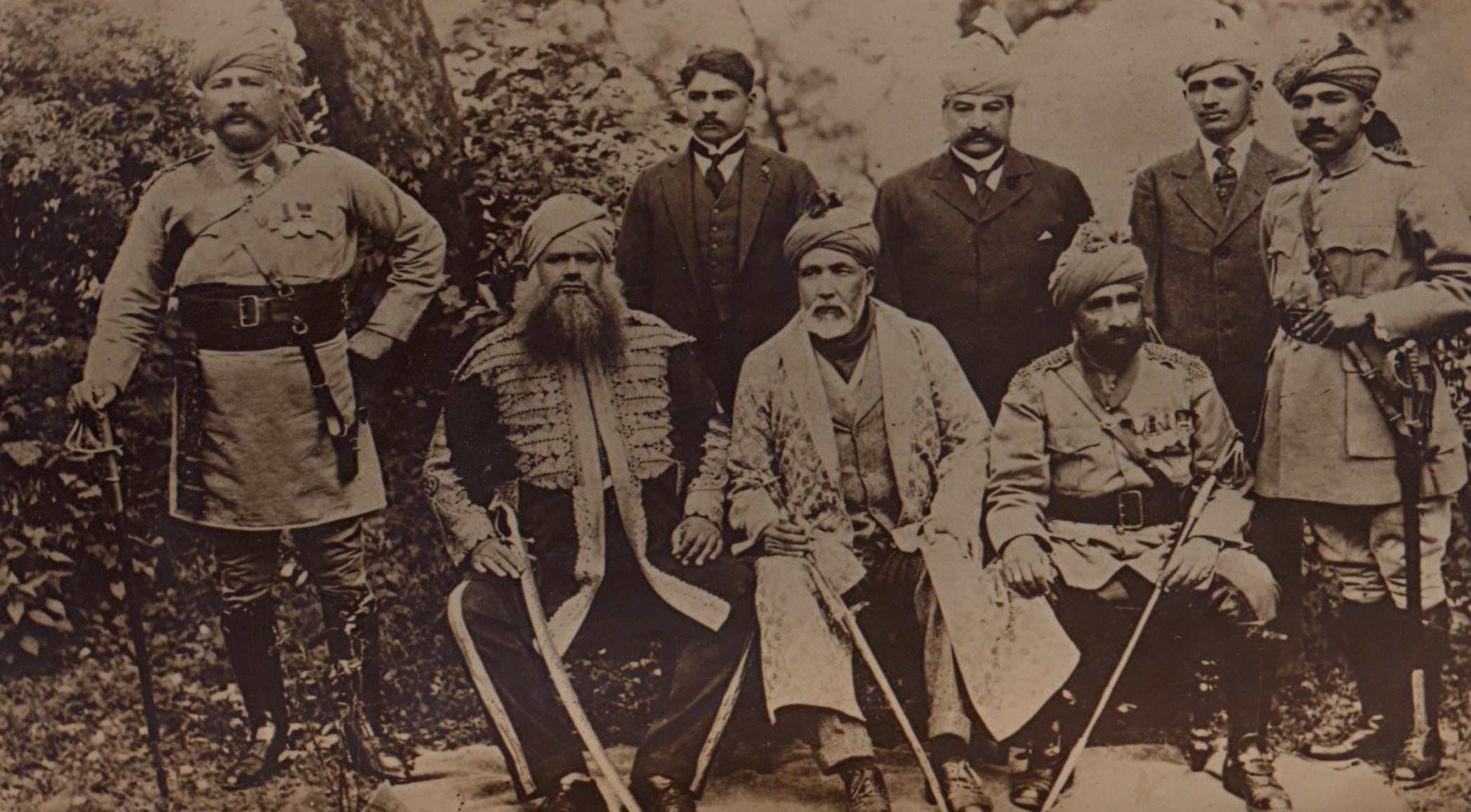
Saiyed Amjad Ali Shah

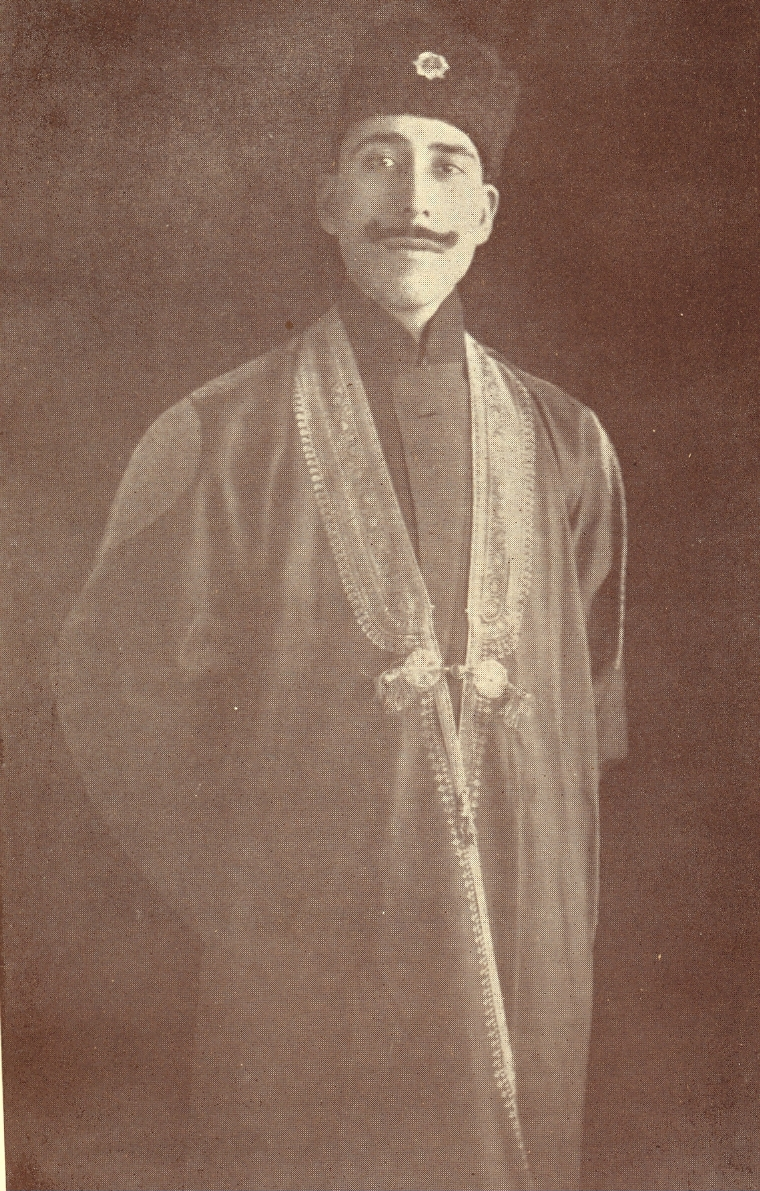
Saiyed Sirdar Ikbal Ali Shah

• Saiyed Muhammad Shah Jan-Fishan Khan . Saiyed Muhammed Ali Shah

• Saiyed Ali Shah . Saiyed Ahmed Shah . Saiyed Amjad Ali Shah

• Saiyed Sirdar Ikbal Ali Shah
