= Teaching stories =

A teaching story is a narrative that has been deliberately created as a vehicle for the transmission of wisdom. The practice has been used in a number of religious and other traditions, though writer Idries Shah's use of it was in the context of Sufi teaching and learning, within which this body of material has been described as the "most valuable of the treasures in the human heritage". The range of teaching stories is enormous, including anecdotes, accounts of meetings between teachers and pupils, biographies, myths, fairy tales, fables and jokes. Such stories frequently have a long life beyond the initial teaching situation and (sometimes in deteriorated form) have contributed vastly to the world's store of folklore and literature.

== Function ==
It is the teaching function of teaching stories that characterises them rather than any other categorisation, however much they may have other uses. Shah likened the Sufi story to a peach:

"A person may be emotionally stirred by the exterior as if the peach were lent to you. You can eat the peach and taste a further delight ... You can throw away the stone – or crack it and find a delicious kernel within. This is the hidden depth."

Thus these narratives also often have a wide circulation outside of any instructional function, where they frequently have cultural significance and entertainment value, or contain a moral answer or solution of some kind, or are put to use to reinforce belief. What makes them distinctively teaching stories however is something different: they are likely to be open-ended, depending on the individual members of their audience for a variety of interpretations. Their purpose is ultimately to change the thinking process itself. They put at the disposal of those who know them an instrument for measuring themselves, the world and situations that they encounter. It is for this reason that the reading, rereading, discussion and interpretation of narratives in a group setting became a significant part of the activities in which the members of Shah's study circles engaged.

According to Doris Lessing:

"A real teaching story, whether thousands of years old, or new, goes far beyond the parables that are still part of our culture. A parable has a simple message: this means that. But in a Sufi teaching story, there may be layers of meaning, some of them not to be verbalized. Current ways of "teaching" literature in schools and universities may make it difficult for literary people to approach Sufi literature as it should be: Sufis do not pull apart a tale to find its meaning, but cite the case of the child who has dismantled a fly and, left with a heap of wings, a head, legs, asks "Where is the fly?" In other words, a student learns to use the mind in ways unfamiliar to us. They "soak themselves" in the material. They ignore the analytical approach, and the practice of memorizing and regurgitating. The meaning of a Sufi tale comes through contemplation, and may take years."

== Folktales ==
Shah described many of the folktales widely dispersed across the world as teaching stories, writing in the introduction to one such tale, The Lost Camel, collected in his World Tales:

"Most of the instrumental and interpretative function of the folktale have tended to be overlooked in the literature, which still usually concentrates upon origins, upon fragmentary beliefs enshrined in the tales, and upon the light which is cast by plots and treatments on the attitudes of the people among whom the story is told."

Without denying the entertainment or moral value in the stories, Shah emphasised that there is in such tales an often hidden dimension of instruction. Stories, such as those from the Thousand and One Nights and other collections of traditional myths and folktales, are considered to fall into this category. Modern examples (although maybe not generally recognized as such) are some of the stories that have been retold and adapted by Disney. These tales have been adapted and laid out in the simplest form of their wisdom, making them easily accessible for children in particular. As Robert Ornstein has written:

"On the surface teaching stories often appear to be little more than fairy or folk tales. But they are designed to embody - in their characters, plots and imagery - patterns and relationships that nurture a part of the mind that is unreachable in more direct ways, thus increasing our understanding and breadth of vision, in addition to fostering our ability to think critically."

== Fables ==
Though a "moral" is appended to many fables, for instance the fables of Aesop, Shah insisted that there were levels of meaning hidden in them that lay beyond the merely didactic:

"The fables of all nations provide a really remarkable example of this, because, if you can understand them at a technical level, they provide the most striking evidence of the persistence of a consistent teaching, preserved sometimes through mere repetition, yet handed down and prized simply because they give a stimulus to the imagination or entertainment for the people at large."

== Nasrudin stories ==
Shah published four books of tales of the Mulla Nasrudin. These stories are known throughout the Muslim world. Superficially, most of the stories may be told as jokes. They are told and retold endlessly in the teahouses and caravanserais of Asia and can be heard in homes and on the radio. But it is inherent in a Nasrudin story that it may be understood at many levels. There is the joke, but there is also the structure of the tale that functions as an analogy or metaphor for some aspect of human nature or learning.

A friend came to visit Nasrudin at home bringing a duck, and Nasrudin had it cooked to share with him. The next week someone called by, claiming to be the cousin of the man who had brought the duck. Nasrudin fed him. The week after that someone came claiming to be the friend of the cousin of the man who had brought the duck. Nasrudin fed him too. This continued, with the connection to the friend with the duck becoming more and more remote each time. Finally, when the next friend-of-cousin-of-friend-of-man-with-duck arrived, Nasrudin heated water up in a pot and then served it to the new guest.

"What's this?" said the man, tasting the hot water.

"This," said Nasrudin, "is the soup of the soup of the soup of the duck."

== Worldwide dispersal and diffusion ==
It is impossible to say how far back in time teaching stories go. Shah's collection World Tales includes the Tale of Two Brothers, an ancient Egyptian story from around the 12th century BC. Jataka tales from India as far back as the 3rd century BC have travelled westwards via the Panchatantra and have long been recognised as having a teaching function. An example is The Tiger, the Brahmin and the Jackal which made its first appearance In Europe some 900 years ago in Petrus Alphonsi's collection of tales, the Disciplina Clericalis (which, according to E.L. Ranelagh, could be translated as "a course of study for the reader").

The blind men and an elephant is a well-known tale that has been used among Jainists, Buddhists and Hindus in India, as well as by Persian Sufi writers Sanai of Ghazni, Attar of Nishapur and Rumi. Shah's Tales of the Dervishes, a collection of narratives gathered from classical Sufi texts and oral sources spanning a period from the 7th to the 20th centuries, gives Sanai's version.

Parallels with other religious traditions are obvious, wherever narratives are used instructionally rather than to generate or perpetuate belief or conformity. Examples might be Zen koans, Hasidic tales, and the parables of Jesus. Sometimes, as in The Tiger, the Brahmin and the Jackal or The Blind men and an elephant, versions of the same story are put to use.

== Some examples of teaching stories ==
- The Pancatantra
- Narratives from Sufi writers, to name a few: Sanai, Attar, Rumi, Saadi, Amir Khusrow
- Stories from the Canterbury Tales such as The Franklin's Tale, The Pardoner's Tale and The Merchant's Tale
- The Hymn of the Pearl
- Cinderella
- Tales from One Thousand and One Nights
- Aladdin
- Myths such as Cupid and Psyche
- Tales collected by the Brothers Grimm, such as The Water of Life
