= Afghanistan Relief Organization =

US-based non-profit organization

Afghan Relief Organization (ARO)
- Founded: 1998; 28 years ago
- Founder: Abdul Satar, Aboul Fazil Khalili
- Type: Humanitarian aid and education
- Purpose: Humanitarian aid, Education
- Location: Cypress, Orange County, California, US
- Region served: Afghanistan
- Website: afghanrelief.org

Afghanistan Relief Organization (ARO) is a humanitarian organization which provides direct aid and education to those in need in Afghanistan. It runs a large technology education centre in the Afghan capital, Kabul, and is also involved in the training of midwives.

== Description ==
Afghanistan Relief Organization is a non-political, non-religious, nonprofit 501(c)(3), non-governmental humanitarian organization, registered in both the United States and in Afghanistan, founded in the United States in 1998. It is based in Cypress, Orange County, California, US, and works in Afghanistan.

ARO was officially formed in 1998 by Abdul Satar, a communications project manager and businessman, and a fellow Afghan, Aboul Fazil Khalili, the grandson of the former Afghan poet laureate, Khalilullah Khalili. They wanted to help a region in the northern province of Takhar suffering after a crippling earthquake.

The organization delivers relief aid in the form of food, medicine, school supplies and winter relief supplies directly to those in need and offers general education programs designed to encourage self-sufficiency. ARO provides free education to 1100 girls and boys, as well as providing adult education programs to both women and men at the Technology Education Center (TEC) in Kabul, where it employs Afghan staff. The centre operates from 7am to 7pm to accommodate the numbers. Courses at the TEC include computing, Dari, Pashtu, English, math, science, and job skills training.

ARO operates with an all-volunteer team and no paid office or warehouse space and with minimal overhead in the United States. The organization spends less than 7 percent on administration and fundraising in the United States and Afghanistan, and attempts to put the maximum percentage of donor contributions to work in Afghanistan.

Afghanistan Relief Organization is not to be confused with the original UK charity Afghan Relief, set up by the writer and Sufi teacher Idries Shah in 1984 and removed from the registry in 2002, having ceased operations.

== Activities ==
=== Aid supplies ===
In February 2002, for the first time in almost 30 years, a commercial 747 aircraft landed at Kabul International Airport, carrying desperately needed humanitarian supplies for Afghanistan Relief. Teaming up with two nonprofit organizations, Evergreen International Airlines' Evergreen Humanitarian and Relief Services Inc. and Mercy Corps, and with the help of Microsoft, $2 million worth of aid supplies, much of it collected by Afghanistan Relief Organization following an appeal, were shipped aboard the plane. Items included hygiene kits, newborn and baby kits, livestock feed, winter clothing and blankets, school kits, and medical supplies

At a meeting hosted by University of California, Los Angeles's International Institute on 7 February 2002, Noor Delawari, an advisory board member of the Afghanistan Foundation and chair of the ARO, spoke of the urgent need for aid in Afghanistan:

Half of the arable land has been destroyed. We had 2,000 miles of road; that is almost all gone. There are hundreds of thousands of orphan children. The mortality among the young people is unimaginable, dying of the cold weather. We must provide shelter for them. 8 million people were displaced over the last decade. We need to build 2 million new homes. We need to create a new security force. We need this to take care of the warlords or others who take advantage of the weakness of the social forces.

=== Education ===
Afghanistan Relief Organization has also raised funds for the training of teachers and the construction of rural libraries in Afghanistan. The fundraising events have been supported by many celebrities, including Halle Berry, former president George H. W. Bush, Cher, Will Ferrell, Jodie Foster, Jake Gyllenhaal, Kite Runner author Khaled Hosseini, Angelina Jolie, Madonna, Eva Mendes, Steve Nash and Natalie Portman.

Afghan Ambassador Said Tayeb Jawad visited Los Angeles, California, on 23 February 2007 to deliver the keynote address at the ARO's annual fundraiser, Peace Through Education.

According to a United Nations Children's Fund (UNICEF) Education Fact Sheet (plus Q and A) for Afghanistan, 2007:

Afghanistan has one the highest proportion of school-age (7–12) children in the world: about 1 in 5 Afghans is a primary school-age child. Despite success in sending children to school, trends in gender disparity in education remains worrisome. For instance, the literary rate for young women (aged 15–24) is only 18 per cent, compared to 50 per cent for boys. The primary school completion rate for boys is 32 per cent versus 13 per cent for girls. In terms of cohort tracking, only 30 percent of girls (age 12 years) reach Grade 5, compared to 56 per cent for boys. (Source: Best Estimates of Social Indicators for children in Afghanistan, 1990–2005).

Film producers Participant Productions and Paramount Vantage have designated ARO as one of the non-governmental organization (NGO) partners in a social action campaign to accompany the award-winning film, The Kite Runner, based on Khaled Hosseini's international best-seller, through an introduction by the author.

In 2007, Paramount Classics and DreamWorks Pictures studios donated 500 laptop computers to schoolchildren in Kabul. The ARO distributed the computers, provided by the One Laptop per Child initiative which is aimed at children in developing countries. Kite Runner author Khaled Hosseini is quoted as saying that "Education of the general population is critical to the transformation of Afghanistan's political and economic condition."

=== Midwifery training ===
With deaths in pregnancy or in childbirth so high in Afghanistan, and few trained women there to assist with childbirth, the training of midwives is another major project for the Afghanistan Relief Organization. In 2006, one in 60 Afghan women died of pregnancy-related causes, giving the country one of the world's highest maternal mortality rates, second only to Sierra Leone. The infant mortality rate was about 135 per 1,000 live births in 2006, which is an improvement from the 165 per 1,000 in 2001.

== See also ==
- Humanitarian aid
