= Safia Shah =

British writer, editor and television news producer

Safia Nafisa Shah
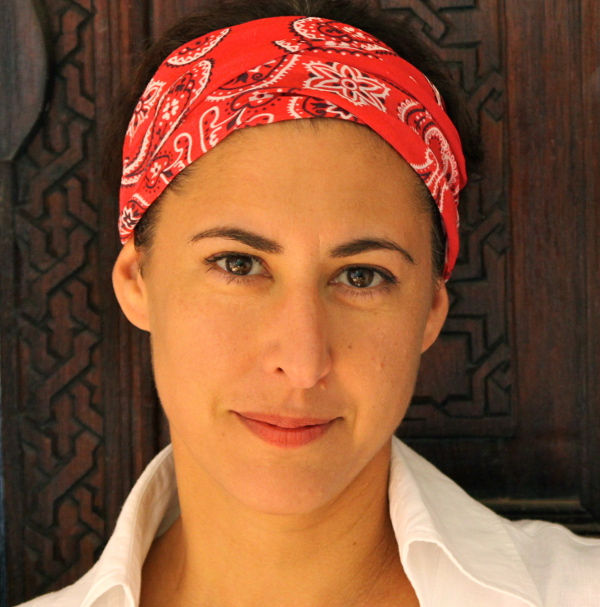
- Safia Shah
- Born: 16 November 1966 (age 59); London, England, United Kingdom
- Occupations: Editor, freelance writer and producer, independent retailer
- Spouse: Ian Thomas
- Children: 2 children
- Parent(s): Idries Shah, Cynthia (Kashfi) Kabraji
- Relatives: Shah family

Safia Thomas (born Safia Nafisa Shah on 16 November 1966; Persian: سفیا شاه, Gujarati: સફિયા શાહ) is a British writer, editor, television news producer and member of the Afghan-Indian Shah family.

She and her husband Ian also founded and ran a respected traditional delicatessen A. Gold in London, specializing in entirely British fare, painstakingly renovating the historic building in the process. They ran this business for several years before moving to live close to Casablanca in Morocco, and later moved to Wincanton in South Somerset, where they set up a design workshop and child-friendly café, Bootmakers, and a humanitarian book project, Kashfi's Children.

== Early life and work ==
Safia Nafisa Shah is the daughter of the well-known author and teacher in the Sufi mystical tradition, Idries Shah; the twin sister of writer, journalist and documentary maker, Tahir Shah, and the younger sister of the writer, reporter and documentary filmmaker, Saira Shah. Her mother is of Indian Parsi ethnicity.

Educated at Bryanston School in Dorset, England, Shah went on to study at the Sorbonne and University of Grenoble in France. She has worked for the London-based Institute for Cultural Research as a research assistant and editor and worked with Afghan refugees in the Khyber Pakhtunkhwa province of Pakistan, as well as reporting on social issues there. She is also a freelance writer and has edited for the Institute of Health Sciences.

Safia Shah's sister, Saira Shah, worked with Safia's future husband, Ian Thomas, and the couple met through her and eventually married at Marylebone Road register office in London. Safia Shah and Ian Thomas have both worked for the American news agency, Associated Press Television, as journalists and producers.

== A. Gold ==
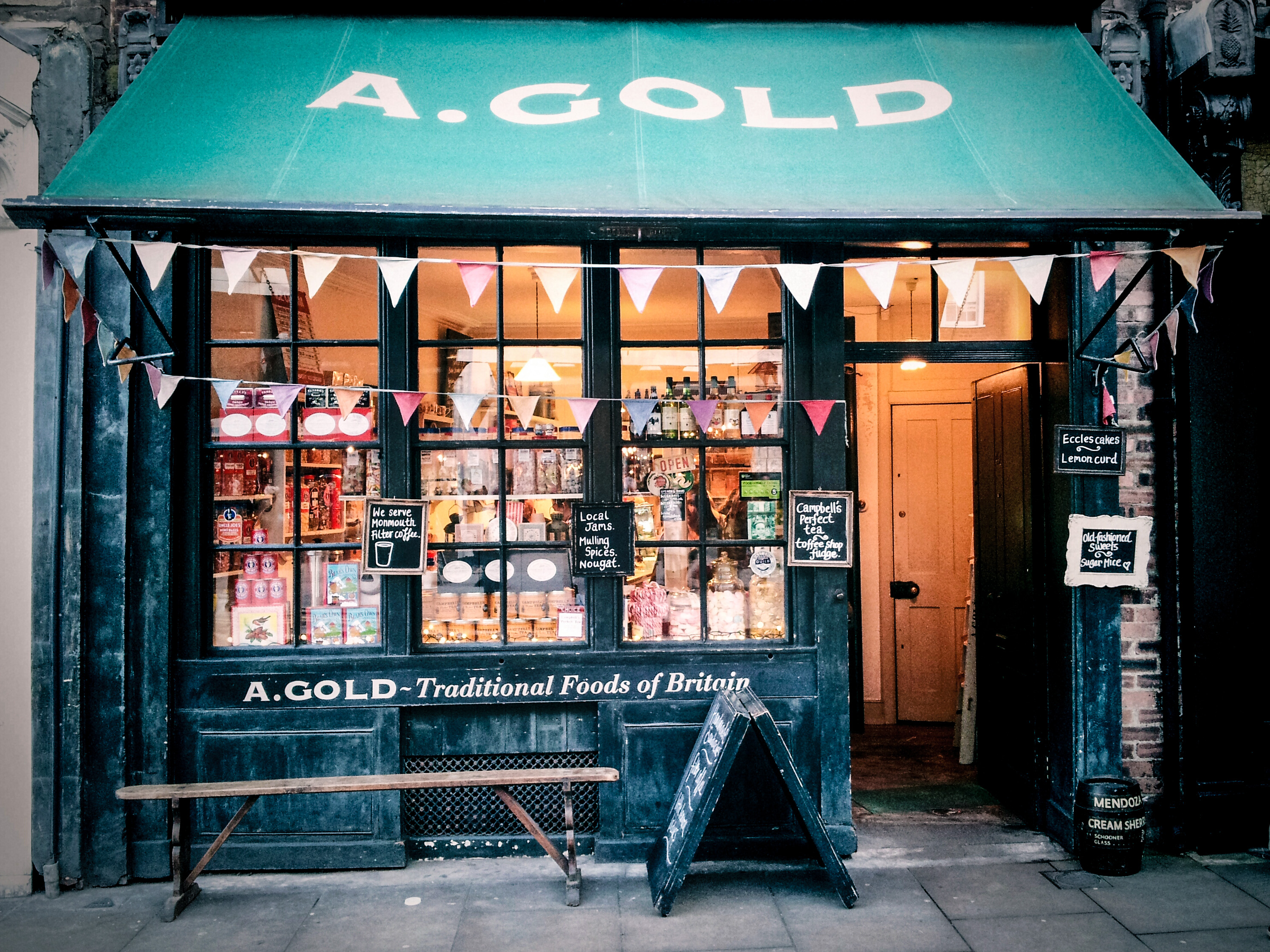
Delicatessen and grocery shop, A. Gold.

Safia Shah (now Safia Thomas) and her husband Ian Thomas left television journalism in April 2000 to found and run the traditional delicatessen and grocer A. Gold selling traditional British fare in Brushfield Street, opposite Spitalfields Market, in London E1. Selling pastries such as Banbury cakes, Campbell's Perfect Tea, and elderflower wine.

According to London food writer and critic Sejal Sukhadwala, the shop is located inside what used to be Henry VIII's artillery ground, where soldiers once practised archery and musketry, and is close to Nicholas Hawksmoor's impressive 18th-century Christ Church, Spitalfields. The area is infamous for Jack the Ripper's serial murders, and the Great Fire of London.

Built in 1780, the four-storey Grade II-listed house has been home in the past to diamond-cutters, furriers, boot makers, drapers and Amelia Gold, a Hungarian who ran a French millinery (hat making) business. Her 1880s shop sign is still emblazoned across the frontage and Safia and Ian Thomas have kept the name and painstakingly restored the historic building. As a result, A. Gold is handsome and old-fashioned looking, while keeping the modern efficiencies of a deli.

A. Gold, which is described as "the village shop in the heart of London", has a lengthy feature in 'The Good Old Days' section of Jane Payton's book, Fabulous Food Shops (2006). The shop was among The Independent's "50 Best Food Shops" with Lulu Grimes, food director of olive magazine and Good Food magazine recommending its sausages, cheeses, sweets and Somerset brandy.

In an article picturing Safia Thomas standing outside her shop, and written a few months prior to the 2008 financial crisis, the London Evening Standard stated that it was championing the capital's independent shops. With the world increasingly dominated by vast supermarkets and chain stores, London had lost over 7,000 individual or family-owned shops between 2002 and 2008 and small businesses were struggling to survive.

== Later life and work ==
Later leaving London, Safia Shah, her husband Ian Thomas, and their two children emigrated to Morocco to live close to Casablanca, where Safia's brother, the author Tahir Shah already lived. Shah currently divides her time between Morocco and England, where she and her family lived for a time on a Dutch grain barge in Surrey.

=== Endangered words ===
Safia Shah has an interest in English language, and a champion of nearly forgotten words. Her interest was shared at the Blue Peter show for the BBC.

=== Bootmakers ===
In May 2018 Shah's design workshop and child-friendly café, Bootmakers Workshop at Wincanton in South Somerset won the Muddy Stilettos Somerset "Muddy Award 2018" for best children's business.

=== Humanitarian book project ===
In April 2021, Shah founded Kashfi's Children C.I.C, a non-profit organisation dedicated to "gift[ing] books to small local non-profits and initiatives which have a proven track record, and which we are sure are committed to fostering education, equality, understanding and tolerance", in countries like Afghanistan and Pakistan. The venture was named after Shah's mother, Cynthia "Kashfi" Shah (wife of the writer and thinker, Idries Shah).

Kashfi's Children works in collaboration with the Institute for the Study of Human Knowledge (ISHK)'s Hoopoe Books "Share Literacy" global outreach programme.

== Works ==
=== Books ===
Safia Shah's most notable work is Afghan Caravan, a miscellany which was collected by Idries Shah and edited by her. In his Introduction to the book, Idries Shah writes:

Afghan Caravan is a collection of writings that takes the reader on a spell-binding journey through Afghanistan, The Unconquerable. It contains a narrative from a Pathan princess; heroic war stories; tips on savvy carpet-buying; Mulla Nasrudin jokes from the front lines of the Mujahidin; even the Great Pilau Recipe of Khalifa Ashpaz, Master Chef of the Hindu Kush, which was reportedly once served to 4,000 guests.

Shah's latest work, Carnaby Street's Great Uninvited, a children's book, was released on 23 October 2013. It is a children's picture book and was illustrated by Mark Reeve, known for his work on Spitting Image. The book features what Shah calls "endangered words," or words that used to be commonly used in the English language but which have slipped from regular use. Along with the Carnaby Street book, Shah created a series of ebooks that focus on numerous endangered words. These books include: As Clear As Mud Volumes 1 and 2: The Brabbler's Guide to Idioms, and A is For Anonymuncle: The Brabbler's Endangered ABC.

=== Short stories ===
‘Brown Bag’ is a short story included in the Bristol Short Story Prize Anthology 4, and has been regarded as "A short and sharp and very English story from Casablanca-based Safia Shah, that captures something of the zeitgeist of our modern, Internet-focused age. The storytelling is adequate throughout, but the real triumph comes right at the end, where it’s sudden and completely unexpected." It describes the main character's reflections on her mother's death, as well as on incidental memories from the past. The 20 stories collected in the Bristol Short Story Prize Anthology 4 were selected from more than 2,000 entries for the 2011 Bristol Short Story Prize.

In November 2013, she released Twice Sifted, a collection of six short stories, which focus on stress-induced anxiety and the many ways in which it is manifested in the characters' lives. Twice Sifted is the first of three volumes of short stories to be released by Shah.

=== The knitted taxi ===
Safia felt that something out of the ordinary had to be done in order to launch her first picture book, Carnaby Street's Great Uninvited. This is how the knitted taxi – a London taxi covered in brightly-coloured, patterned knitting wool that toured London – came to life, thanks to the communal efforts and love for knitting which were offered by a group called the Materialistics.

== Reception ==
Afghan Caravan was chosen by Nobel prize-winning writer Doris Lessing as the Daily Telegraph "Book of the Year" where it was described as "a cornucopia a mix of magical tales, nuggets from history... an Aladdin's cave of a book" and in Literary Review as "a great deal of fascinating material... It is a book to be dipped into, excellent bedside reading."

Talking about both Afghan Caravan and Tahir Shah's The Middle East Bedside Book, Lessing writes in The Sufis and Idries Shah: "Both are full of delights; there is a great deal that is surprising; and, as with all books from that source, we are reminded of a generosity and largeness of mind in a culture that once, long ago, gave us the concept of chivalry."
