= Omar Ali-Shah =

Afghan Sufi teacher and writer (1922–2005)

Omar Ali-Shah ओमर अली शाह عمر علی شاہ
- Born: 1922
- Died: 7 September 2005 (aged 82–83); Jerez, Spain
- Occupations: Sufi teacher, writer
- Spouse: Anna Maria Ali-Shah
- Children: Arif Ali-Shah & Amina Ali-Shah
- Relatives: Shah family
- Writing career
- Subject: Sufism
- Notable works: The Course of the Seeker, Sufism for Today, The Rules or Secrets of the Naqshbandi Order

Omar Ali-Shah (Hindi: ओमर अली शाह, Urdu: عمر علی شاہ, romanized: nq; 1922 – 7 September 2005) was a prominent exponent of modern Naqshbandi Sufism. He wrote a number of books on the subject, and was head of a large number of Sufi groups, particularly in Latin America, Europe and Canada.

== Early life ==
Omar Ali-Shah was born in 1922 into a family that traces itself back to the Prophet Mohammed, and through the Sassanian Emperors of Persia to the year 122 BC. He was the son of Sirdar Ikbal Ali Shah of Sardhana, Uttar Pradesh, India and the older brother of Idries Shah, another writer and teacher of Sufism.

== Career ==
Omar Ali-Shah gained notoriety in 1967, when he published, together with Robert Graves, a new translation of the Rubaiyat of Omar Khayyam.

This translation quickly became controversial; Graves was attacked for trying to break the spell of famed passages in Edward FitzGerald's Victorian translation, and L. P. Elwell-Sutton, an Orientalist at the University of Edinburgh, maintained that the manuscript used by Ali-Shah and Graves – which Ali-Shah claimed had been in his family for 800 years – was a "clumsy forgery". The manuscript was never produced for examination by critics; the scholarly consensus today is that the "Jan-Fishan Khan manuscript" was a hoax, and that the actual source of Omar Ali-Shah's version was a study by Edward Heron-Allen, a Victorian amateur scholar.

== Schism ==
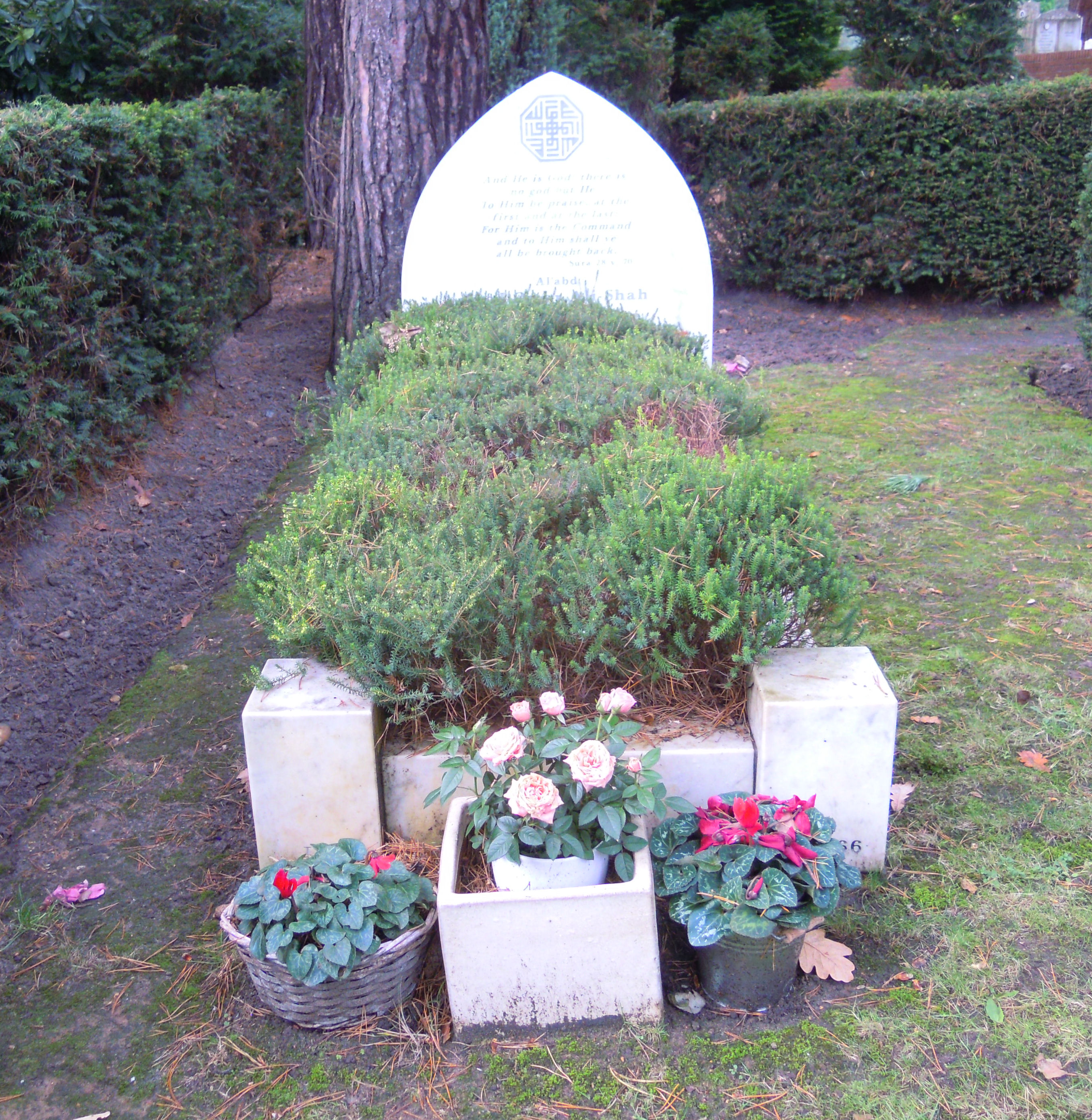
Omar Ali-Shah's grave in Brookwood Cemetery

The two brothers, Idries Shah and Omar Ali-Shah, worked and taught together for some time in the 1960s, but later agreed to go their separate ways. Both brothers also worked with legendary animator, Richard Williams. Omar worked for a time as Richard's producer. They parted ways after Omar was accused of embezzling from the company. Their respective movements – Idries Shah's "Society for Sufi Studies" and Omar Ali-Shah's "Tradition" – were similar, giving some prominence to psychology in their teachings. Omar Ali-Shah's teachings had some distinctive features, however. He had many more followers in South America, and his movement attracted a younger following than his brother's. There were also more references to Islam in his teachings, and unlike his brother, Omar Ali-Shah's movement embraced some Islamicate practices.

Omar Ali-Shah's followers sometimes undertook organised trips to exotic locations, which he described as having a developmental, or cleansing, purpose: "One of the functions performed in the Tradition is making, keeping and deepening contacts with people, places and things, such as making trips similar to the ones we have made to Turkey and elsewhere." Sufi travel was seen as a pilgrimage to sites that could both energise and purify the visitor.

Following Idries Shah's death in 1996, a fair number of his students became affiliated with Omar Ali-Shah.

Omar Ali-Shah – called "Agha" by his students – gave lectures which have been recorded for distribution in printed format. He died on September 7, 2005, in a hospital in Jerez, Spain and is buried in Brookwood Cemetery near Woking.

The Sufi student and deputy, Professor Leonard Lewin (University of Colorado), led study groups under the guidance of Idries Shah, Omar Ali Shah and his son, Arif Ali-Shah.

== Bibliography ==
- Omar Ali-Shah (1988). The Course of the Seeker. Tractus Books. ISBN 2-909347-05-2.
- Omar Ali-Shah (1993). Sufism for Today. Tractus Books. ISBN 2-909347-00-1.
- Omar Ali-Shah (1998). The Rules or Secrets of the Naqshbandi Order. Tractus Books. ISBN 2-909347-09-5.

== See also ==
- Naqshbandi
- Eleven Naqshbandi principles
