= Saira Shah =

British author, reporter and documentary filmmaker

- Born: 5 October 1964 (age 61); London, UK
- Education: Bryanston School; School of Oriental and African Studies, University of London
- Occupations: Author, reporter and documentary filmmaker
- Notable work: Death in Gaza (2004 documentary film)
- Partner: Scott Goodfellow
- Children: 3
- Parent(s): Idries Shah, Cynthia (Kashfi) Kabraji
- Relatives: Shah family
- Awards: BAFTA Award (2005), Emmy Award (2005)

Saira Shah (born 5 October 1964) is a British author, reporter and documentary filmmaker. She produces, writes and narrates current affairs films.

== Life ==
Saira Shah was born in London and was raised in Kent, England. She was educated at Bryanston School and read Arabic and Persian at the School of Oriental and African Studies, University of London, graduating in 1986. Her father was Idries Shah, an Indian-Afghan and half-Scottish writer of books on Sufism. Part of his family was originally from Paghman, Afghanistan. Her mother is half-Indian Parsi and half-English. The author Tahir Shah is her brother and she also has a sister, Tahir's twin, Safia Shah.

Shah currently lives between London and rural France with her partner, journalist and photographer Scott Goodfellow, and their son and daughter Hamish and Rosie Goodfellow. Ailsa Goodfellow, their first daughter, died, suddenly, of a pulmonary embolism early in 2017. Shah said: "Ailsa inspired me to write a novel, The Mouse-Proof Kitchen, based on her life, which was published in 2013. By then Ailsa had become our teacher, demonstrating how to live with courage, patience and joy – and proving that the essence of humanity lies far deeper than mere development." The novel gives a vivid account of how the fictional characters Anna and her husband Tobias deal with their daughter Freya's birth and the experiences which they must undergo before fully appreciating the miracle of her life.

== News reporter and documentary maker ==
Shah's first trip to Afghanistan was when she was 21 years old. She worked for three years in Peshawar as a reporter covering the Soviet invasion of Afghanistan. She has also worked as a journalist for Channel 4 News, which she left in 2001. She married and divorced (after five years) a Swiss reporter, whom she met in Peshawar.

Shah worked with James Miller on several projects including the films Beneath the Veil (2001), Unholy War (2001), both Channel 4 Dispatches films for the UK documentary company Hardcash productions, and Death in Gaza (2004), for their own TV company Frostbite Films. Miller was killed in 2003. In 2004, Shah won a Current Affairs BAFTA Award for Death in Gaza and in 2005 the film won three Emmy Awards for Outstanding Cinematography For Nonfiction Programming (Single Or Multi-Camera), Outstanding Directing For Nonfiction Programming and Exceptional Merit in Nonfiction Filmmaking (Shah sharing one award as a producer and being a nominee for another as a writer). Shah also appeared on the television programme Breakfast with Frost on 10 August 2003.

== Films ==
- Beneath the Veil
- Death in Gaza
- Unholy War

== Film companies ==
- Frostbite Productions

== Books ==
- Shah, Saira (2003). The Storyteller's Daughter: One Woman's Return to Her Lost Homeland. New York, NY: Anchor Books. ISBN 1-4000-3147-8.
- — (4 April 2013). The Mouseproof Kitchen. London, England: Harvill Secker. ISBN 978-1476705644.

== Newspaper and magazine articles ==
- Shah, Saira (7 April 2011). "'Afghaniyat' is alive and well in Afghanistan". The Guardian.
- — (30 March 2013). "'She began to smile at us' – living with my profoundly disabled child". The Guardian.

== Interviews ==
- Birnbaum, Robert (19 November 2003). "Saira Shah: Identity Theory". Identity Theory.
- Calkin, Jessamy (1 April 2013). "Difficult truths: Saira Shah interview". The Daily Telegraph. London.

== Reviews ==
- Eberstadt, Fernanda (9 August 2013). "Sunday Book Review: French Lessons: Saira Shah's 'Mouse-Proof Kitchen'". The New York Times.

== Awards ==
- 2002: Royal Television Society – Best International Current Affairs – Beneath the Veil
- 2002: Royal Television Society – Programme of the Year – Beneath the Veil
- 2002: Royal Television Society – Reporter of the Year – Saira Shah
- 2002: BAFTA – Best current affairs – Beneath the Veil
- 2002: One World Media Award – Beneath the Veil
- 2002: SAIS-Novartis International Journalism Award – Beneath the Veil
- 2002: Mo Amin Courage Under Fire Award – Saira Shah
- 2002: International Documentary Association Courage Under Fire Award – Saira Shah
- 2002: Peabody Awards – Beneath the Veil and Unholy War
- 2002: News and Documentary Emmy awards – Winner of Outstanding Investigative journalism – Beneath the Veil
- 2002: News and Documentary Emmy awards – Nomination for Best documentary – Beneath the Veil
- 2002: News and Documentary Emmy awards – Outstanding coverage of a continuing news story – Unholy War
- 2002: Golden Nymph award, Monte Carlo – Beneath the Veil
- 2005: BAFTA – Best current affairs film – Death in Gaza
- 2005: Emmy – Exceptional Merit in Nonfiction Filmmaking – Death in Gaza
- 2005: Emmy – Nomination for Outstanding Writing for Nonfiction Programming – Death in Gaza
- 2005: One World 2005 – Human Rights award – Death in Gaza

== See also ==
- James Miller (filmmaker)
