= Sayram (city) =

Rural locality in Shymkent, Kazakhstan

Sayram Kazakh: Сайрам, romanized: Sairam
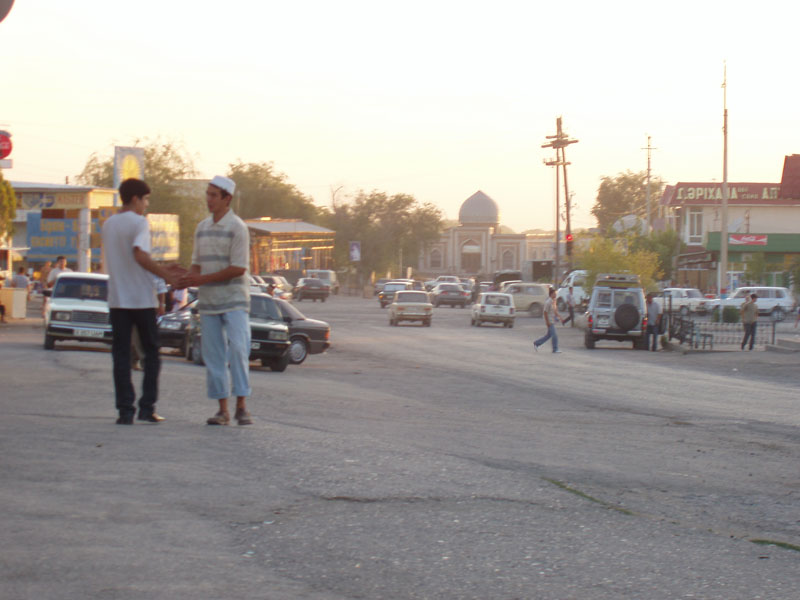

- Location in Kazakhstan
- Coordinates: 42°18′0″N 69°46′0″E
- Country: Kazakhstan
- Region: Shymkent City
- Founded: 10th century BC

Government
  - Akim (mayor): Husan Muzafarhanovich Akhmadhanov

Area
  - City: 10 km^{2} (3.9 sq mi)
- Elevation: 600 m (2,000 ft)

Population (2009 census)
  - City: 32,757
  - Metro: Shymkent
- Time zone: UTC+6 (ALMT)
- Postal code: 160812
- Area code: +7 72531
- Climate: Csa
- Old name: Isfījāb

Sayram (Kazakh: Сайрам, romanized: Sairam [sɑjˈrɑm]) is a rural locality located in eastern Shymkent on the Sayram Su River, which rises at the nearby 4000-meter mountain Sayram Su. In medieval times, the city and countryside were located on the banks of the Arys River, into which the Sayram Su river flows. Since 2018, it has been part of Shymkent City. Population: 30,887 (2009 census results); 25,408 (1999 census results).

The city celebrated the 3,000th anniversary of its founding in 1999. It is among the oldest cities in Kazakhstan, as well as one of the oldest continuously inhabited cities in the World, the site of the first mosque in Kazakhstan, and similarly among the oldest cities in Transoxania. Sayram is significant today for maintaining mud-brick architecture and the absence of Soviet-style architecture. There are many pre-20th-century mausoleums, and more continue to be built.

Archaeology in Central Asia was active following its conquest by the Russian Empire, but remains a relatively understudied area. There has been some field work done in the city both before and during the rise of the Soviet Union, and there is likewise renewed interest in the city as one of the oldest cities of the independent country of Kazakhstan. Notable among the archaeological discoveries is evidence of an early plumbing system like the kinds found in Samarqand and other cities of the early Persian empires.

There is another city named Sayram in Xinjiang, China located between Kucha and Aksu, which, according to local tradition, was founded by captives captured by the Qalmaqs.

== Etymology ==
The oldest name of the city according to historical evidence is Isfijab (Espijâb, Isfījāb, Asfījāb), which remained until the Mongol conquest. Mahmud Kashgari mentioned it as the "White City which is called Isbījāb," suggesting its connection with the Soghdian/Persian word for white, sipīd or ispīd. Kashgari also mentioned that the city was known as Sayram at that time, the name which the town bears today. The Russian Orientalist N. S. Lykoshin suggested that Sayram's correct name was Sar-i ayyām, or 'Ancient of Days'. His editor held, however, that instead of ayyām, it was instead the Arabic yamm, 'sea, river' and referred to the source of a stream. If the name Sayrām is actually Turkic, it probably refers to 'a place of shallow water.' To wit, al-Kāshgharī gives, alongside his entry on Sayrām as the name of Isfijāb, the phrase seyrem sūw, 'shallow water,' which coincidentally is the name of the river running east of the center of the city. Kāsgharī also later notes the verb seyremlen-, 'to become shallow,' with the phrase sūw seyremlendī, 'the water became shallow (or scanty)'.

== History ==
The modern city of Sayram celebrated its 3,000th year of continued habitation in 1999. Sayram is a city on the frontier between irrigated farmland and the pastures of the Dasht-i Qipchaq. It has a long history of commercial and political importance as a border town and has been the site of numerous conquests and reconquests.

Sayram steadily lost its importance as an important trading hub after a time of rapid growth due to the internal warriors of the local feudal lords at the beginning of the 18th century and there is only one village with the same name on its position today.

=== Earliest history ===
Some local historians have attempted to find proof of Sayram's prehistory in the holy book of the Zoroastrian faith. They state that the first recorded mention of Sayram is in the Avesta, the holy book of Zoroastrianism. There are several names mentioned, though it is possible they refer to people, places, cities, or geographic features. Historian Richard Frye states that "even guesses about their identity do not help us in reconstructing history." The word appearing in the Avesta is Sairima, which some historians equate with the name Sayram. There is mention of a river, and a land or people called Sairima elis, or people or land of/near Sayram.

=== Before Islam ===
In the 7th century, the Western Turkic Confederation consisted of five Tu-lu and five Nu-shih-pi tribes, known collectively as the On Oq (Ten Arrows) and by the Chinese as Shih Hsing (Ten Clans). In 642, the khaqan (khan) of the Tu-lu Turkic tribe took refuge in Isfijab from the Nu-shih-pi.

After the expulsion of the heretical sects of Christianity, there came a large number of Christians to Central Asia and the East. Largest among them were the Nestorians, who were condemned at the First Council of Ephesus in 431. There was a community of Nestorian Christians in Sayram when Islam first came to Sayram in 766 AD who resisted conversion. Buddhism was also prevalent in Central Asia at that time.

=== Islamic conquest ===
Sayram was already an important trading site in the centuries before the Arab Conquest. Islam was brought to Sayram and its neighboring cities by a detachment of Arabic and Arabic-speaking soldier-missionaries from the already converted lands to the south. Sayram, or Isfijab as it was then known, served as a border town between the Islamic lands and the pagan Turks.

The Arab Conquest was led by Iskak, known today in Sayram as Iskak-bab. The standard bearer of these soldiers of Islam was ‘Abd al-‘Azīz. One surviving manuscript, entitled Nasabname, tells how the Muslim warriors under Iskak-bab came to Sayram and met with the Nestorian patriarch of Sayram, Nakhibar.

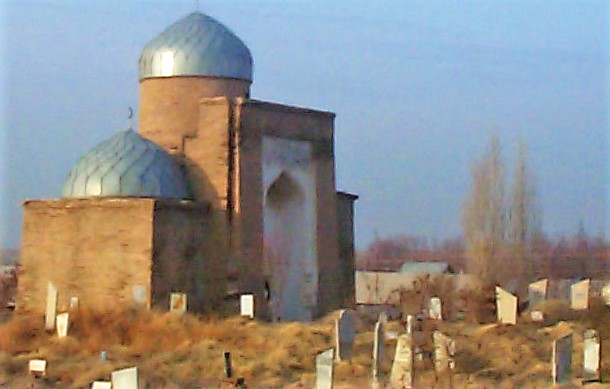
Three-Domed Mausoleum of ‘Abd al-‘Azīz-baba and Seyt Kozhakhan-ata, originally built by the order of Timur

Iskak-bab invited Nakhibar to the true faith. But Nakhibar replied, "I am a tarsa (Christian) of the seventieth generation, and my faith is true! That is why I shall fight you." Hand-to-hand combat ensued, and lasted for three days and nights. Ten thousand Nestorian tarsas and fifteen thousand Muslim missionaries died for their faith. The color-bearer of the Muslim forces was ‘Abd al-‘Azīz.

The same manuscript goes on to describe Iskak-bab's building of the first mosque in Sayram, which would make it the first mosque in all of present-day Kazakhstan, as well.

"After that he set up a Friday mosque in Sayram. The first stone in the foundation was laid by his hands. He sanctified the stone with holy water."

=== Under the Samanids ===
In 840 AD, the Samanid chief of Samarkand Nūḥ ibn Asad, wrested control of the city from the Turks. In that year, Nūḥ built a wall around it to protect it from the Turks. By this time the city was a flourishing market center at the nexus of nomad and sedentary lands. It was also a linchpin in the broad zone of protective forts built to protect the Samanid empire from nomadic raiders. Moqaddasi numbered these fortresses, or ribāṭs, at 1,700. They built outer walls to protect the crops of the inhabitants from raiders, but the town was not only a military outpost. Traders from Bukhara and Samarkand constructed large caravanserais for themselves in Sayram.

Sayram was also the main contact between Samanid Islam and the Qaghan Turks of Turpan, Kashgar, and Kucha. The alternate southern routes were controlled by rival factions, leaving the primary route east through Farab and Sayram.

Sayram is significant for maintaining a degree of independence from the Samanids, remaining a possession of the local Turkic dynasty. The rulers owed three signs of loyalty to the Samanids: military service, the presentation of symbolic gifts, and the name of the Samanid ruler on minted currency. Sayram at this time was one-third the size of Banākath (now in ruins near present-day Chinoz, Uzbekistan), the chief town of the neighboring district of Shāsh (present-day Tashkent).

Sayram was divided into three districts, like others of the time: qohandez (citadel), madīnah (inner town), and rabaż (suburb), the latter two being protected by walls. All the houses were of mud brick. The government center (dār al-imārah), the prison, and the Friday mosque were all in the inner city. There were four main gates to the inner town, each guarded by a ribat manned by ghāzīs (volunteer fighters for the faith) recruited from Bukhara and Samarkand. The ruler of Sayram apparently also exercised some authority within the steppes, since Moqaddasi mentions that the "king of the Turkmen" at nearby rdū habitually sent presents to Asfījāb.

=== Under the Qarakhanids ===
The Qarakhanids seized the city in 980, during the reign of Nuh II of the Samanid Empire. At this time, according to al-Istakhri, the city marked the border between Karluks and Oğuz Turks. Sayram was part of the eastern Qarakhanid khanate based on three cities: Sayram itself, Talas, and Farghāna. Coins were minted there by the Qarakhanid rulers. In the opening years of the 7th/13th century, the district seems to have been taken over by the Qipchaqs of the middle Syr Darya, for the Khorezmshah ʿAlāʾ al-dīn Muḥammad devastated the area beyond the Syr Darya to prevent it from falling into the hands of the Mongol leader Küchlüg.

=== Sayram under the Mongols ===
The city of Sayram was captured by the Mongols using catapults under the command of the Siet Alahai.

In 1220, the Taoist monk Qiu Chuji left his home town of Shandong in northern China and traveled to Persia to present himself before Genghis Khan. His fame as a pious exemplar of Taoist belief had preceded him, and his travels carried him over roads newly restored by the Mongols, roads that were then in better condition than when the Russian imperial orientalist V. V. Barthold described them in the early 20th century. Qui Chuji (Chan-Chun, or Чан-чунь in Barthold's work) traveled through the land of the Uyghurs, through Kulja, through Zhetysu, crossing first the Chu River on a wooden bridge, then the Talas River on a bridge of stone, before reaching Sayram in November 1221. The city of Sayram is mentioned in some detail in Qui Chuji's book Travels to the Western Regions, recorded by his disciples after Chuji returned home.

Genghis Khan camped in Sayram, and awaited the arrival of his sons in 1223. Sayram's neighbor to the west was not so lucky, the doomed city of Otrar, also called Utrar or Farab, and the birthplace of Al-Farabi, which was utterly destroyed by the Mongol leader.

The famous historian Rashid-al-Din (1247–1318) wrote that Sayram was also known as Kary Sailam (Old Sayram). At that time it was a large city with forty gates, and it took one whole day to cross the city.

=== Sayram under Timur ===
It is unclear when the city fell under Timur's rule. Under the Timurids, Sayram was an important border city, a center of trade, and Timur gave rule of the city to his grandson Ulugbek. In 1404, the right wing of Timur's China-bound invasion force wintered in Sayram, Tashkent, and Banākath. ‘Abd al-Razzāq wrote that in 1410 the fortress of Sayram was besieged by Moghul forces, and by the end of the 15th century was given to Yunus Khan of Moghulistan, where his son was reigning in 1496.

During the Ming dynasty, envoy Chen Cheng was sent by the Yongle Emperor to the Timurid khanate and subsequently dedicated one chapter of his book A Record of the Barbarian Countries in the Western Region to Sayram.

Toward the end of the Timurid power, in the middle of the 15th century, Sayram was raided regularly (along with Turkestan) by the Moghul amir Mir Haqq-Berdi Bekichek.

=== Sayram under Muhammad Shaybani ===
Shaybani Khan took Sayram in 1503. With the coming of Uzbek power in the region, Sayram fell to Muhammad Shaybani Khan along with the rest of the region. However, peace in the region was elusive. The Kazakhs soon grew in power and Sayram became a common prize of raids and wars between the Kazakhs, Uzbeks, and Qalmaqs.

=== Sayram under Kazakhs and Zunghars ===
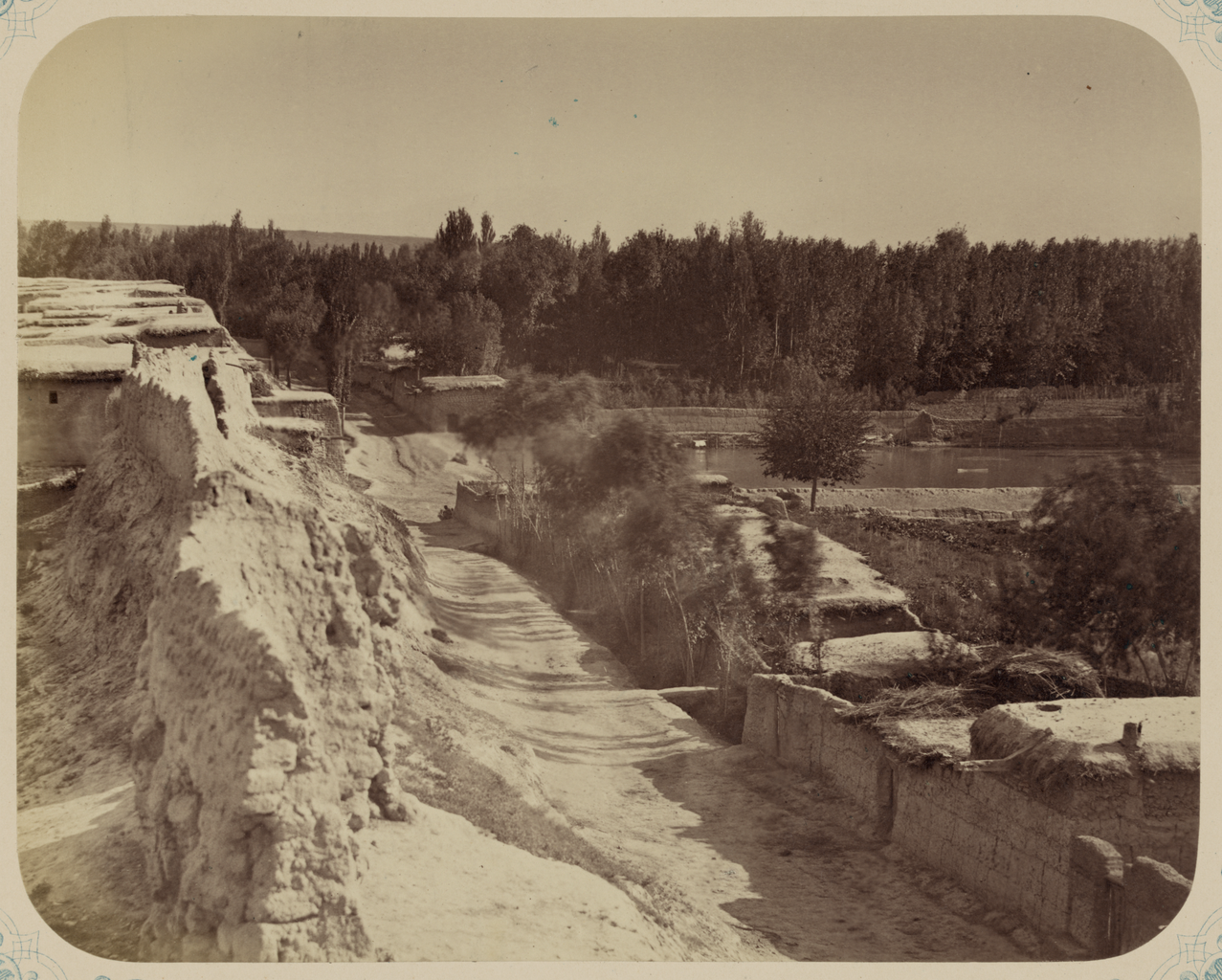
Sayram in the 1890s

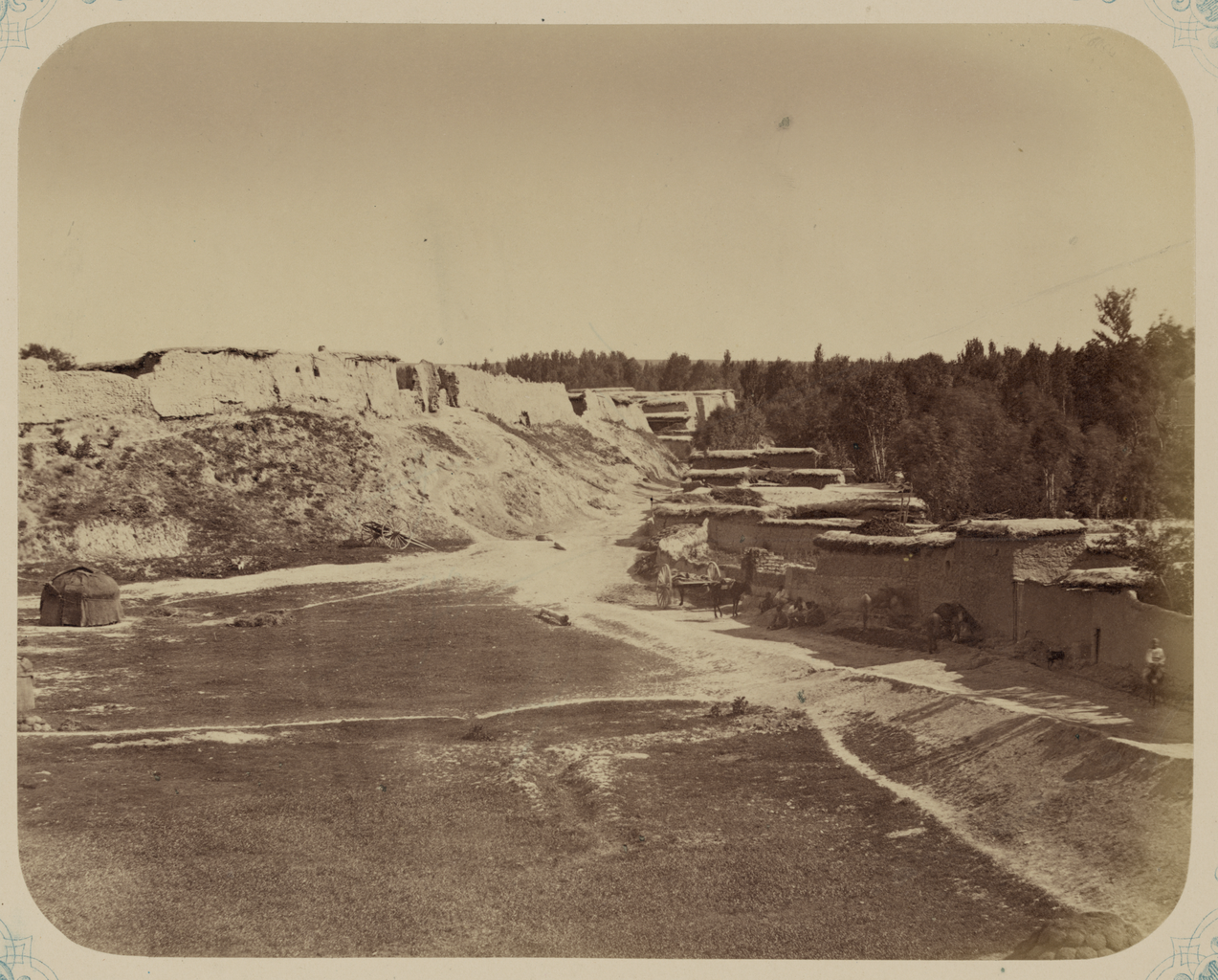
1890s: Destroyed city walls of Madīnah (Inner town)

In 1512, the keys of the city were given to Qasim Khan, Khan of the Kazakhs when he came to the city. In Babur's account, no khan was as respected or authoritative as Qasim, who could command over 300,000 men.

Manṣūr Khān led an Uzbek force against the Kazakhs in 1522 in response to their raids from the region of Sayram into the Farghana. The failure of this expedition to control Kazakh raids effectively ended attempts by the Uzbeks to control Sayram and its region.

The rise of the collection of Oirat clans into what became known as the Zunghar Khanate in the 1600s saw much of what is now southern Kazakhstan leave the control of the Kazakh Khans. The historian Barthold argued that only after Galdan Boshugtu Khan, the Khong Tayiji of the Zunghars, had successfully conquered and destroyed the power of Sayram did he move his encampment west to the valley of the Ili, ensuring his control of Zhetysu east of Sayram. Galdan sent forces against Sayram in 1681, which must have been unsuccessful because they returned in 1683, when Barthold tells us that his commander Rabtan (probably Tsewang Rabtan took the city and razed it.

Sayram was slowly rebuilt, likely with the support of the merchants of Central Asia and the leadership of the Kazakhs. This knowledge comes from the fact that the city appears again as a target of Zunghar aggression forty years later.

In 1723, the year of the Barefooted Flight of the Kazakhs, Sayram, Turkistān, and Tashkent passed under the control of the Qalmaqs and remained within their control until their destruction by the Chinese in 1758.

=== Sayram under the Khanate of Kokand ===
The city of Sayram was taken by the Ming of the Kokand Khanate in 1810. The local Qazaq population, and possibly the local sedentary population, revolted against Kokand control in 1820-1. There is little mention of Sayram in regional histories until its fall to the Russians in 1864, by which time the nearby city of Chimkent had already begun to eclipse Sayram in local importance.

=== Sayram under the Russians ===
After the Russian conquest in 1864, several new villages were founded around Sayram. They were found to be prosperous by I. I. Geier, a local Russian journalist/historian writing in the first decade of the 20th century, though Sayram was still noted for its superior wheat, horse market, historical background, and many tombs.

=== Sayram under the Soviet Union ===
During National delimitation, the area of Sayram was at one point part of the Turkistan ASSR. At that time, the majority of modern-day Kazakhstan, including the steppe regions, were part of the separate Kirgizstan ASSR. After this period of border drawing and redrawing, Sayram eventually became part of the Kazakh Soviet Socialist Republic. It remains in the successor independent country of the Kazakh SSR, Kazakhstan.

== Demographics ==
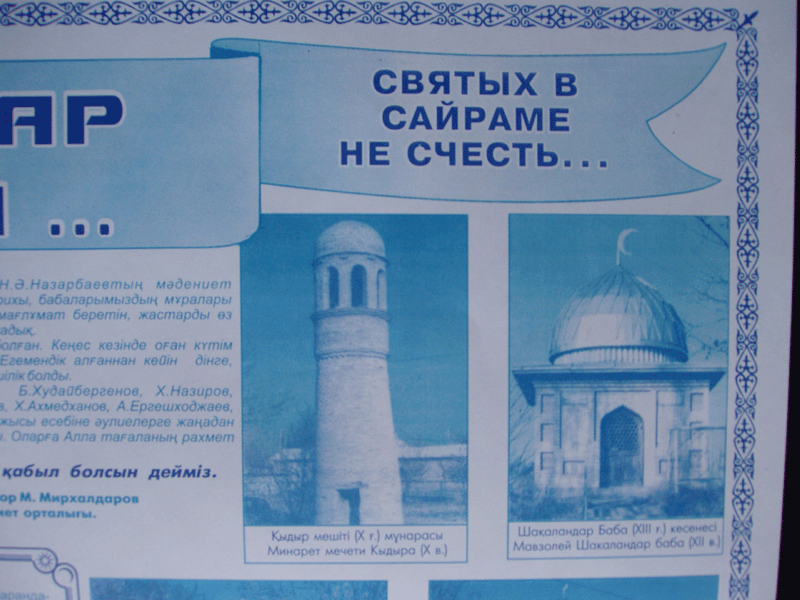
Sayram's historic minaret of the former Kydyr mosque

The population of over 200,000 is roughly 95% Uzbek, 3% Kazakh, and 1% Russian, with the remainder being Uzbek-speaking Azeris, Chechens and Tajiks. Sayram is a city of observant Muslims, and the call to prayer can be heard from the city's mosques.

The economy of Kazakhstan being much stronger than Uzbekistan's, Sayram has seen an increase of migrant laborers from Uzbekistan, as well as those coming to stay as permanent residents.

=== Ethnic groups ===
The citizens of modern Sayram are ethnic Uzbeks. There is small minority of other ethnicities, mostly Kazakhs.

=== Religion ===
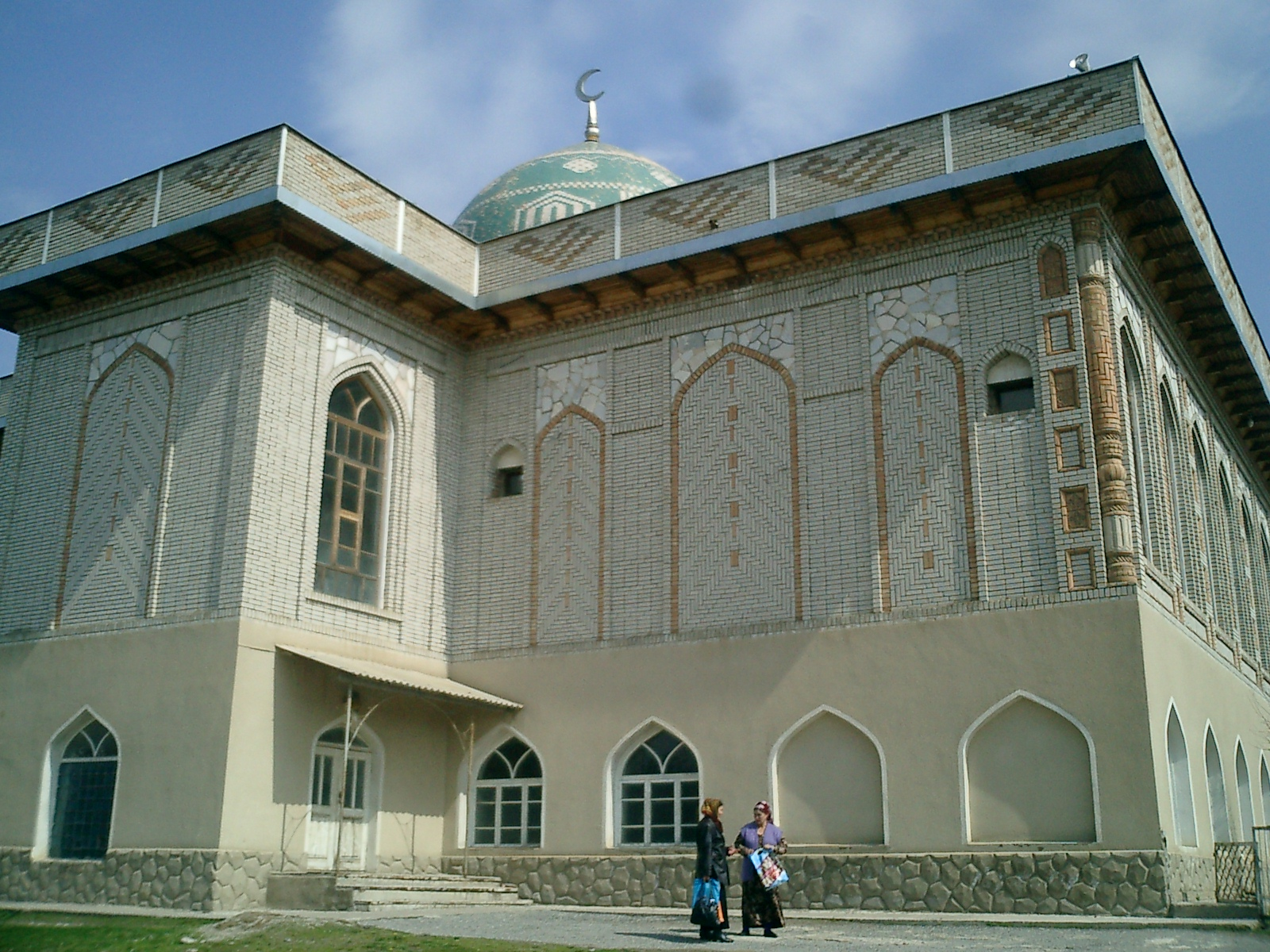
Sayram's Friday Mosque, built in the last ten years by donations from foreign philanthropists.

The religion of the inhabitants of Sayram is Islam. Like most of Central Asia's Muslims, the people of Sayram follow the Hanafi school of Islamic jurisprudence.

== Main sights ==
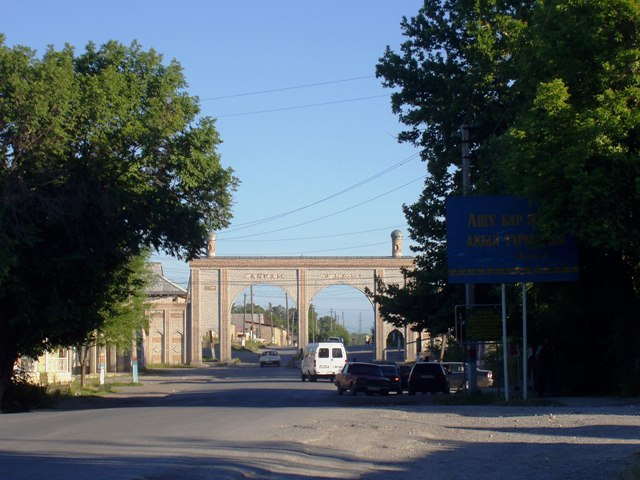
Main Gate of Sayram

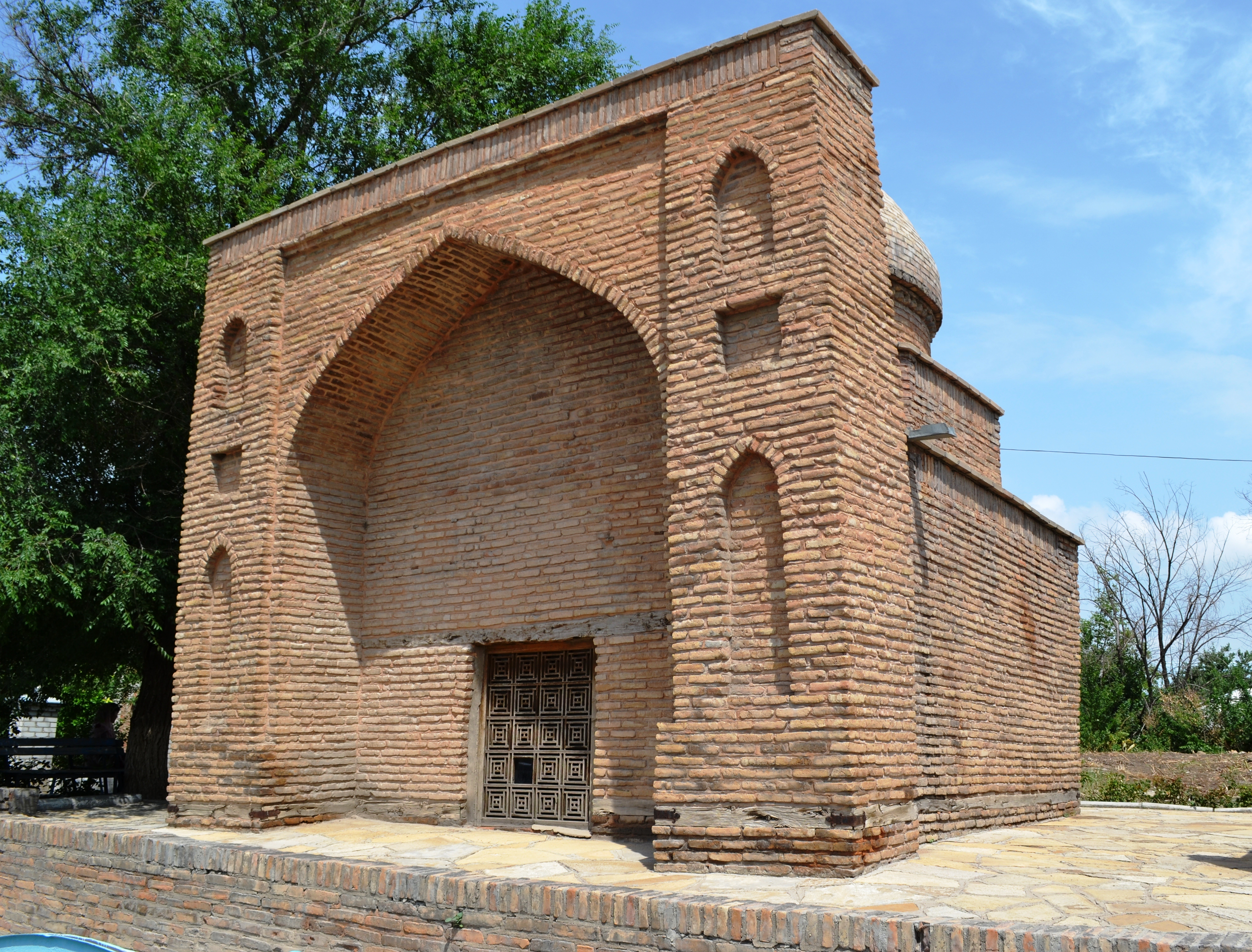
Karashash Ana Mausoleum

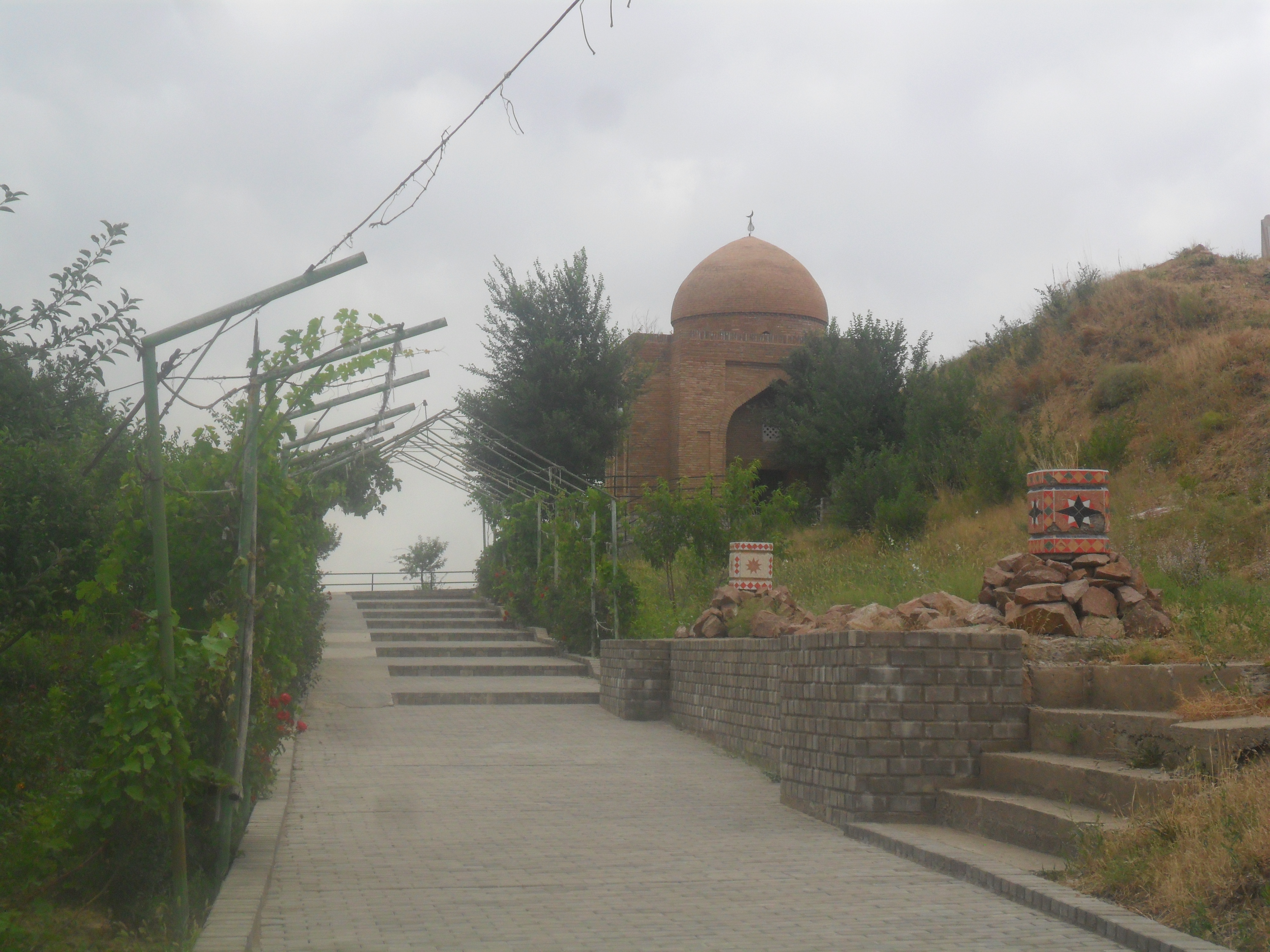
Ibrahim Ata Mausoleum

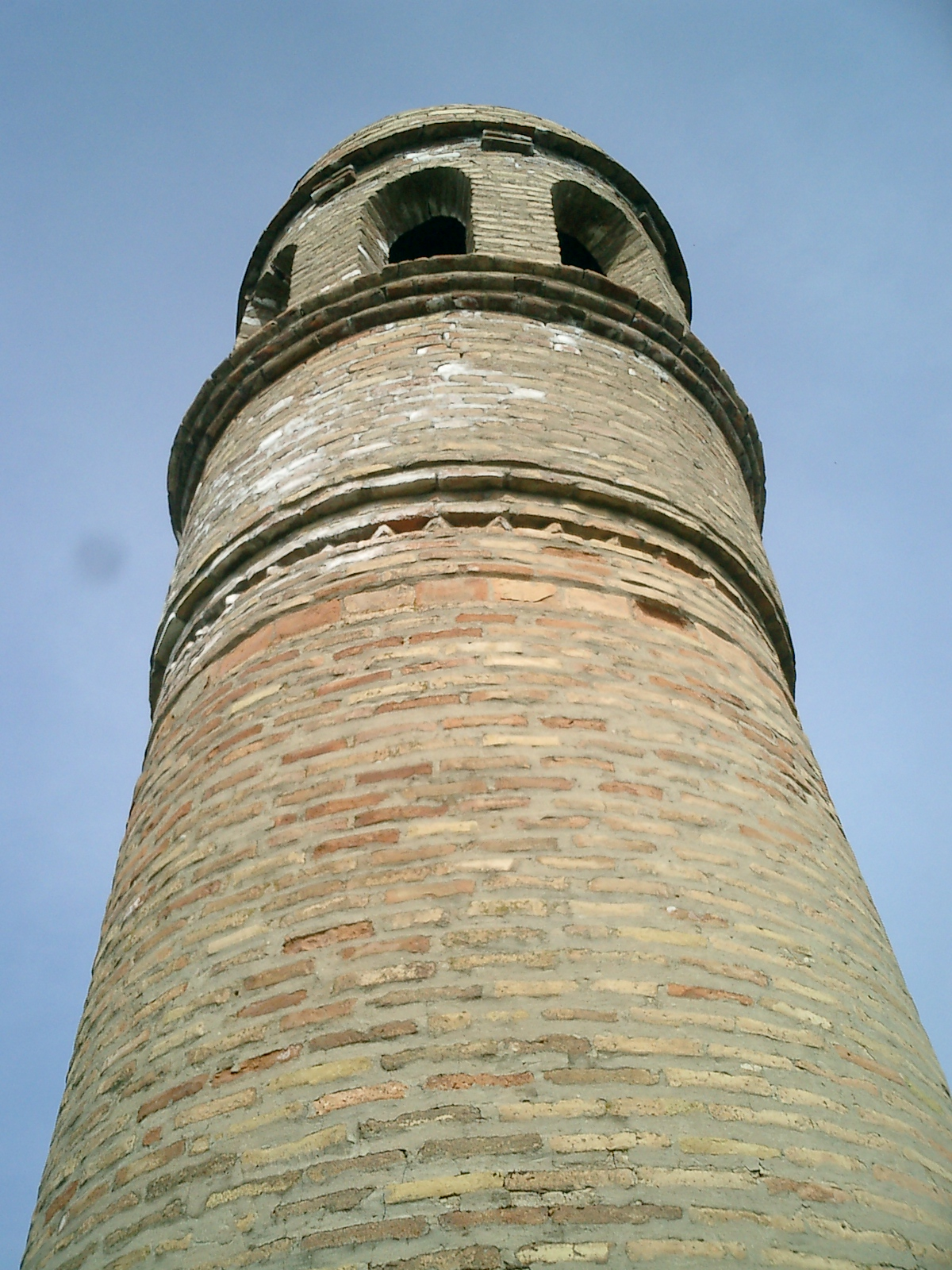
Minaret to the Kydyr mosque, 10th century. Roughly 45 feet (15 meters) tall.

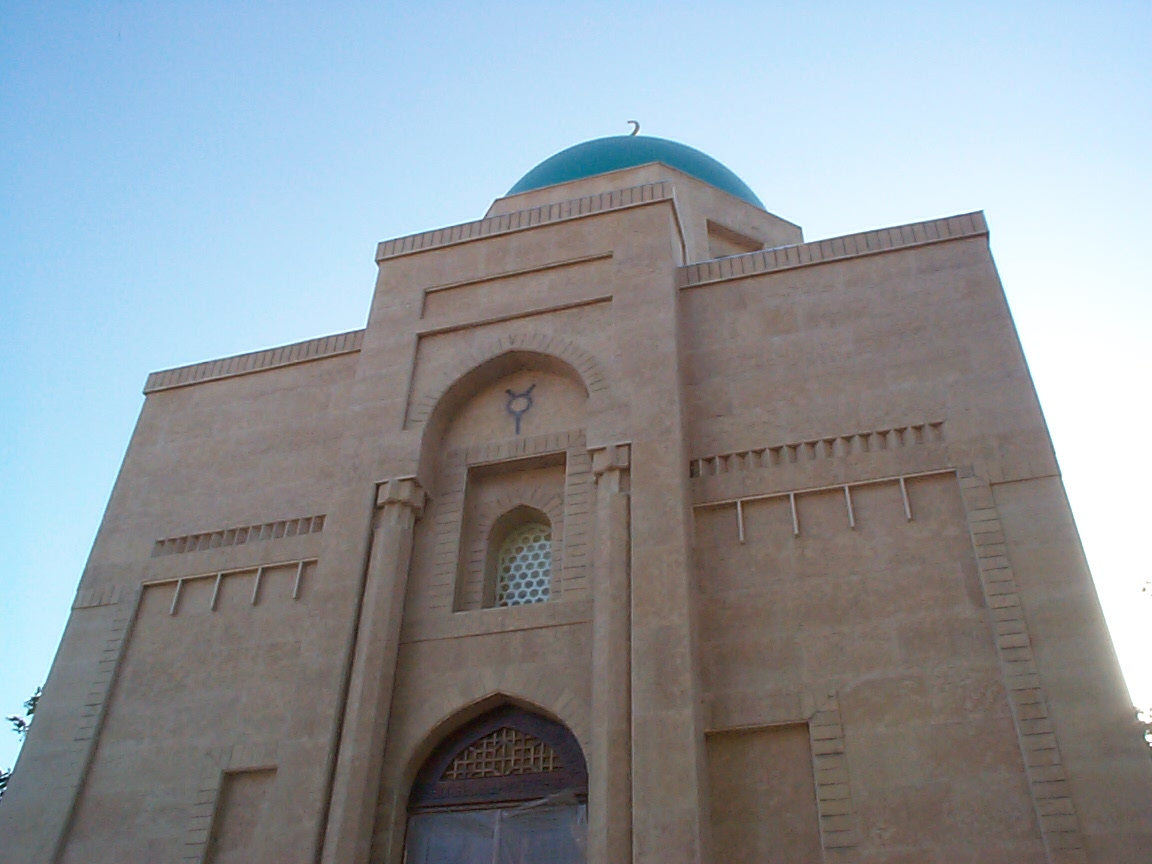
The newest mausoleum in Sayram today was built and finished in 2005 for Botbay Ata.

Modern Sayram is still very much a part of ancient Central Asia. Unlike most of Kazakhstan, it bears almost no mark of Soviet planning or modernization. The streets curve in many directions, while the center of the town occupies the same crossroads that have been used for centuries. There are no apartments in the city proper, and no buildings more than two stories high, allowing the skyline to be dominated by the domes of local minarets, mosques, and mausoleums, some more than 1,000 years old. The main tourist and pilgrimage attractions are the mausoleums and the Minaret of the former Kydyr mosque built in the 10th century.

=== List of the most popular mausoleums in Sayram ===
- Karashash Ana Mausoleum
- Ibrahim Ata Mausoleum
- Botbay Ata Mausoleum
- Mirali Baba Mausoleum
- 'Abd al-'Azīz-baba Mausoleum

== Transportation ==
Sayram is reachable via a ten- to fifteen-minute bus, taxi, or marshrutka ride from Shymkent, which is host to an airport that also receives domestic flights from Kazakhstan's international hubs Almaty and Astana.

== See also ==
=== Ahmad Yasavi and Sayram ===
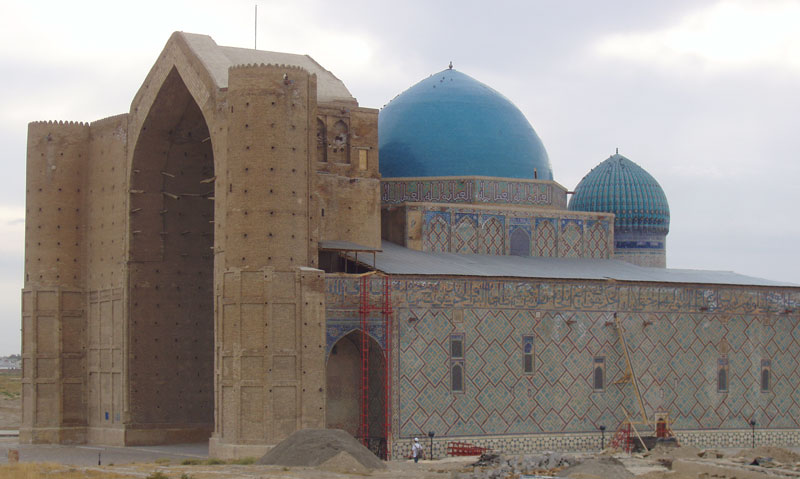
Ahmad Yasawi's mausoleum, bearing the largest dome in Central Asia, located in Turkestan

The man who later became Khoja Ahmad Yasavi was born in Sayram. The date of his birth is difficult to ascertain from historical documents, and later 13th-century hagiographical sources show evidence of pushing the date of his life to before the Mongol Conquest, i.e. c. 1103–1166. This chronology is generally accepted in contemporary Central Eurasian studies. His first teacher was Hazrat Shayh Shahobiddin Isfijabi. Today he is known by the nickname Oqota Baba (White Grandfather). Near his mausoleum, there is a small stream bridged by the main road into Sayram. This bridge is the focus of a local legend concerning the meeting of Ahmad as a boy and the great wanderer Arslan Bab - also well known as Arystan Bab.

==== Ahmad in local legends ====
According to legend, Arslan was one of the Islamic prophet Muhammad's followers. He had already lived 300 years before meeting Muhammad, and was well versed in all of the world's religions, though he chose to follow Islam alone. As Muhammad's death drew near, he asked his followers who would take the stone of his holy date, a carrier of all Islamic knowledge, and give it to the next generation. Arslan replied that he would gladly bear this burden, and taking the stone, continued on his journey. Hundreds of years later, as he passed through the small town of Isfijab, Arslan Baba [his title of respect] was stopped on the road by a young boy. "Grandfather, give me my date stone!" demanded the young Ahmad. Arslan relinquished the stone, and following the death of Ahmad's father in 1113, journeyed with Ahmad to Yasi.

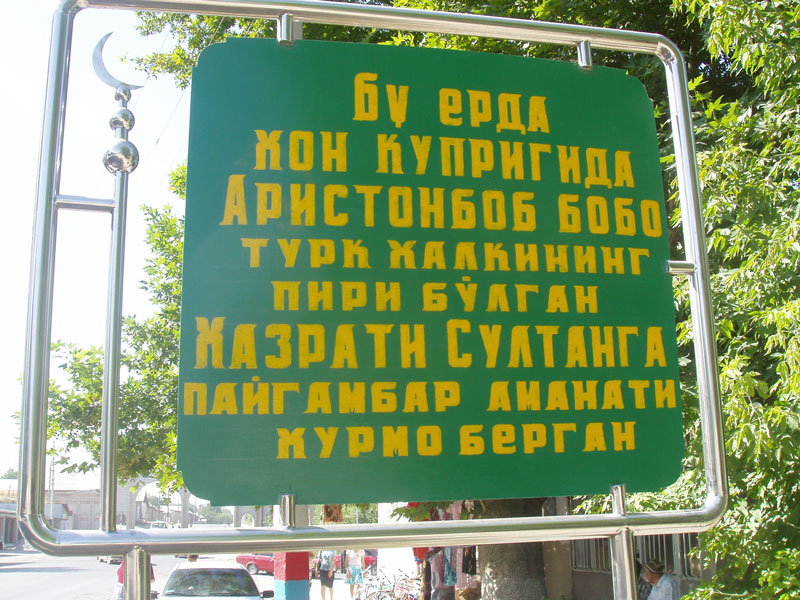
Sign in Sayram (written in Uzbek) marking the bridge where Arslan Baba passed a persimmon stone to young Ahmad Yasavi

From there Ahmad became a prize pupil and one of the rising stars of Sufism. Arslan Baba finally succumbed to old age and was buried near Otrar. Later the Arystan Bab Mausoleum was built on his grave. Following Arslan's death, Ahmad moved to Bukhara and followed the studies of Yusuf Hamadani before moving to Yasi.

==== The Yasavi Order ====
He spent the majority of his life in Yasi, taking the name Ahmad Yasawi. His order is known as the Yasawiyya/Yasavi, and is particularly important in the history of the region, as well as in Anatolia. Their order was known for its disdain for hypocrisy and also the inclusion of certain historic Central Eurasian traditions identified with Zoroastrianism and Manichaeism. The earliest historical record of the Yasavi Order comes from Hakim Ata, and the uncertainty surrounding Ahmad's order stems from the confusion regarding the multiple dates given for Hakim's life and possible direct descent from Ahmad as the second, third, fourth, or fifth generation of the order.

Ahmad's mother and father are buried in Sayram. Their mausoleums are both major sites of pilgrimage today, drawing pilgrims from all over Central Asia: Kyrgyzstan, Uzbekistan, and the surrounding area. Tīmūr ibn Taraghay Barlas decreed that a mausoleum be raised over the site of the Sufi's grave.

=== See also ===
- History of Kazakhstan
- Ahmed Yesevi
- Kazakhstan
- Silk Road
