= Keith A. Buzzell =

Keith A. Buzzell (1932–2018) was an American osteopathic physician, lecturer, author, and practitioner of the Gurdjieff Work, also known as the Fourth Way. His work focused on bridging the teachings of G.I. Gurdjieff with contemporary understandings of science, consciousness, neurophysiology, and education.

== Early life and education ==
Buzzell was born in 1932 and developed an early interest in music, philosophy, science and mysticism. In 1950, at the age of eighteen, he purchased G.I. Gurdjieff's All and Everything sparking a lifelong engagement with the Gurdjieff's work. He attended Bowdin College on a full scholarship before transferring to Boston University, where he earned an A.B. in 1955. Initially studying music, he later shifted his focus to medicine, earning a Doctor of Osteopathic Medicine (D.O.) degree from the Philadelphia College of Osteopathic Medicine in 1960. During his studies in Philadelphia, he helped establish a free clinic. He completed an internship at the Osteopathic Hospital of Maine in 1961, and took a Fellowship at Kirksville College of Osteopathic Medicine in 1962 where he also taught.

== Medical career ==
Buzzell established a family practice in Fryeburg, Maine, in 1969 where he served the community until his retirement in 2010. He was also the medical director of Fryeburg Health Care Center from 1982 until 2018. Throughout his career, he played key roles in various health-related organizations, including founding and directing Hospice of Western Maine (1989 to 1995). He also served as adjunct clinical faculty for New England College of Osteopathic Medicine (1987–1997).

His medical publications included “History of Manipulative Therapeutics" (1962), Osteopathic Theory and Methods (1967-1969, in four volumes) and Neurophysiologic Basis of Osteopathic Practice (1969), and The Children of Cyclops: The Influence of Television Viewing on the Developing Human Brain (1998).

== Contributions to the Gurdjieff Work ==
Buzzell was a lifelong student of the Gurdjieff Work. In 1971, he met Irmis Popoff, a student of Gurdjieff and Ouspensky, and worked under her guidance until the mid-1980s. Later, he corresponded with Annie Lou Staveley, founder of the Two Rivers Farm Work community in Oregon, until her death in 1996.

Buzzell authored multiple books on Gurdjieff's teachings, including Perspectives on Beelzebub’s Tales (2005), Explorations in Active Mentation: Re-Membering Gurdjieff’s Teaching (2006), Man: A Three-brained Being (2007), Reflections on Gurdjieff’s Whim (2012), A New Conception of God (2013), and The Third Striving ( 2014). He also contributed essays to the quarterly journal Stopinder. A Gurdjieff Journal for our Time and presented papers at the All and Everything International Humanities Conference between 1996 and 2012.

=== Research on consciousness and media ===
Buzzell explored the intersection of Gurdjieff’s philosophy with modern neuroscience, particularly regarding the impact of television on brain development. His 1998 book, The Children of Cyclops: The Influence of Television Viewing on the Developing Human Brain, built upon Paul MacLean's triune brain theory, aligning it with Gurdjieff’s concept of the three-brained being. He argued that modern media conditions human perception and affects neural processing before higher cognitive faculties can assess information critically. Suggestibility was identified by Gurdjieff as one of the chief problems of human psychology. Buzzell's work highlighted the vulnerability 220 million years of brain and sensory evolution play in conditioning all organisms to accept neural images as necessarily real. Gurdjieff's teaching was considered by Buzzell to be a crucial bridge between science and spirituality. He also sought to cast modern scientific concepts, such as the electromagnetic spectrum of energy, in terms commensurate with Gurdjieff's cosmology. In addition, Buzzell sought to recast standard scientific terminology and conceptualizations of physical laws (such as the four fundamental forces, chemical bonding, mass-energy equivalence, etc.) into psychological frameworks based on the utilization of attention.

==== The enneagram and symbolic studies ====
Buzzell proposed a novel interpretation of the enneagram, a symbol first introduced by Gurdjieff, suggesting that the First Series of Gurdjieff’s All and Everything was structured according to an enneagrammatic framework. He developed a unique derivation of the enneagram he called A Symbol of the Cosmos and Its Laws and presented his research at the International Humanities Conferences beginning in1996.The video presentation at right gives a holistic view of this synthesis.

== Bibliography ==
- The Third Striving. 2014 ISBN 978-0-9763579-5-7
- A New Conception of God. 2013 ISBN 978-0-9763579-4-0
- Reflections on Gurdjieff’s Whim. 2012 ISBN 0-9763579-3-3
- Man: A Three-brained Being. 2007 ISBN 0-9763579-2-5
- Explorations in Active Mentation: Re-Membering Gurdjieff’s Teaching. 2006 ISBN 0-9763579-1-7
- Perspectives on Beelzebub’s Tales. 2005 ISBN 0-9763579-0-9
- Stopinder Journal, contributing essays, 2000-2003
- “The Family Triad,” Journal of Family Life, Vol. 5 no. 1, 1999
- The Children of Cyclops: The Influence of Television Viewing on the Developing Human Brain. 1998 ISBN 1-888365-20-X
- Man— A Three-brained Being. Maine: Wyllaned, 1997
- “History of Manipulative Therapeutics,”Journal of American Osteopathic Association, 1962
- Neurophysiologic Basis of Osteopathic Practice, Postgraduate Institute, New York, 1969
- Osteopathic Theory and Methods, four-volume manual, Kirksville College of Osteopathic Medicine, Missouri 1967-1969
