= Arystan Bab Mausoleum =

Mausoleum of a mystic in Kazakhstan

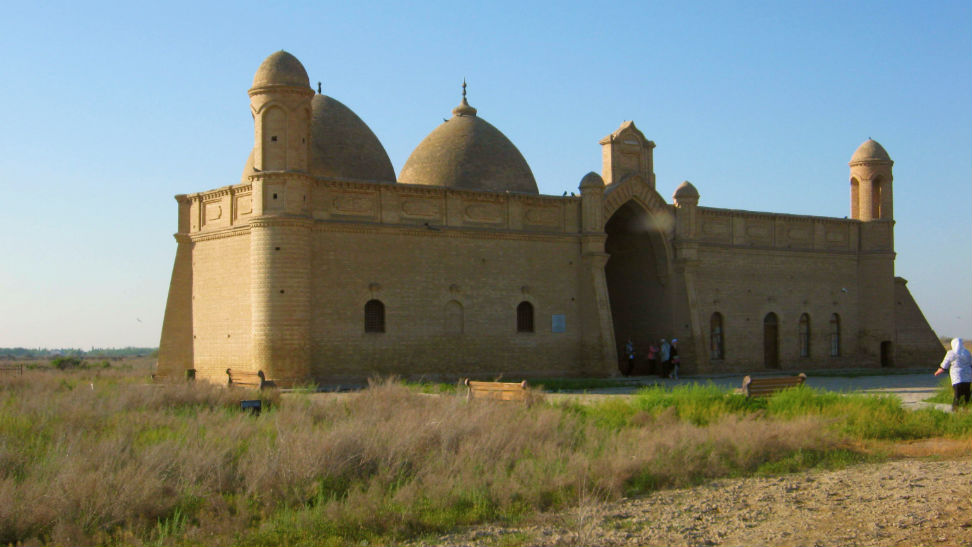
- The mausoleum in 2015

- Location within Kazakhstan

Religion
- Affiliation: Islam

Location
- Location: Kazakhstan
- Coordinates: 42.851°N 68.268°E

Architecture
- Type: Mausoleum
- Groundbreaking: 14th century
- Completed: 1909

Specifications
- Length: 13 m
- Width: 30 m
- Dome: 2
- Minaret: 2
- Materials: Burnt brick with alabaster mortar

Arystan Bab Mausoleum (Kazakh: Арыстан баб кесенесі, romanized: Arıstan bab kesenesi) is a mausoleum in Kazakhstan close to the village of Kogam and Otrartobe.

== History ==
According to legend, Timur ordered the construction of a mosque on the site of Mausoleum of Khoja Ahmed Yasawi, but all attempts were futile. Timur was then told in a dream (by Yasawi) that in order to have success, he should first build a mausoleum over the grave of Arystan Bab.

The mausoleum dates back to the 14th century and is constructed over Arystan Bab's 12th-century grave, but was reconstructed several times up to the 18th century. In the 18th century the previous mausoleum, which had been destroyed by an earthquake was replaced with a double domed structure supported by two carved wooden columns. Most of the current structure was constructed in the first decade of the 20th century with only the carved wooden pillars, remaining from the original building.

== Description ==
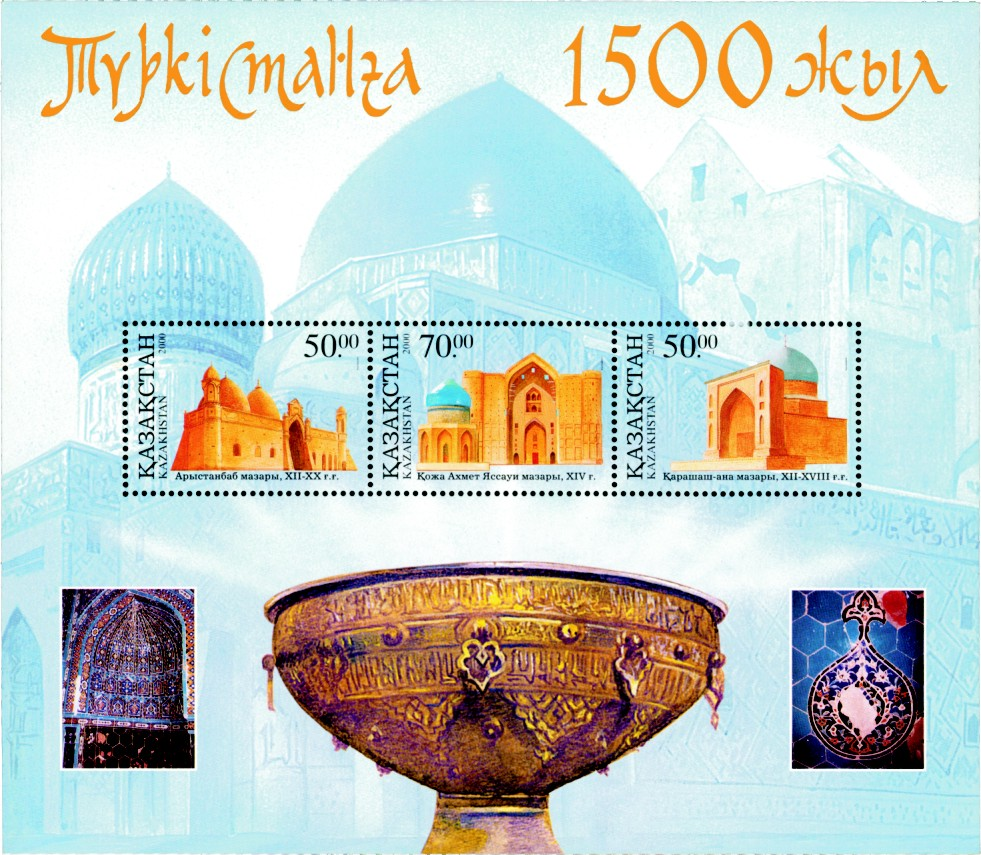
The mausoleum on a Kazakh stamp (left)

The mausoleum features a large central arch and wide front facade with minarets at the ends and two large domes to the left of the main arch. As well as the two-chambered table-tomb (gurkhana) of Arystan Bab and three of his students, Hermet-Azyra, Karga-Baba and Lashyn-Baba, a mosque and auxiliary quarters and museum are located in the other rooms of the mausoleum. The effect of high groundwater levels led to the mosque being demolished and rebuilt in 1971. A quran showing medieval calligraphy is displayed under glass here.

The mausoleum is today a place of pilgrimage.

== Legendary origin of Arystan Bab / Arslan Baba ==
His birth and death dates are unknown. Some sources record his name as Baba Arslan, Arslan Baba or Arap Arslan Baba. According to Yasawi menkıbes (ie. sagas), being of black descent, he was one of the Companions of the Prophet and lived for four hundred to seven hundred years. According to two separate narrations, the companions became hungry during a war or at a meeting at Arslan Baba's house. Meanwhile, with the prayer of the prophet Muhammad, Jibril brings a plate of date from heaven. When one of the dates falls to the ground, Jibrîl says that that date is the fate of Ahmad Yasawi (who will be born in the future). Then the prophet asked his companions "who will deliver these dates to Yasawi?". Arslan Baba aspired for the position the prophet puts the date in his mouth. Many centuries later, Arslan Baba finds the orphaned seven-year-old Ahmad in the city of Sayram in Turkestan and delivers the date to him. According to some legends, he also puts on the cardigan given by the prophet. He also instructs Yasawi to "a thousand and one dhikr" and tells him that he will die soon and orders him to perform the funeral prayer. The houris come to help Yasawi, cut a silk shroud for Arslan Baba and take him to heaven. Following the last order of Arslan Baba, Yasawi went to Bukhara and continued to be a su'luk, and a follower of Yusuf Hamadani.
