= Ahmad Yasawi =

Kara-Khanid poet and Sufi (1093–1166)

Sayyid Khawaja Hadrat-i Turkistan Ahmad Yasawi
- احمەت ياساۋى
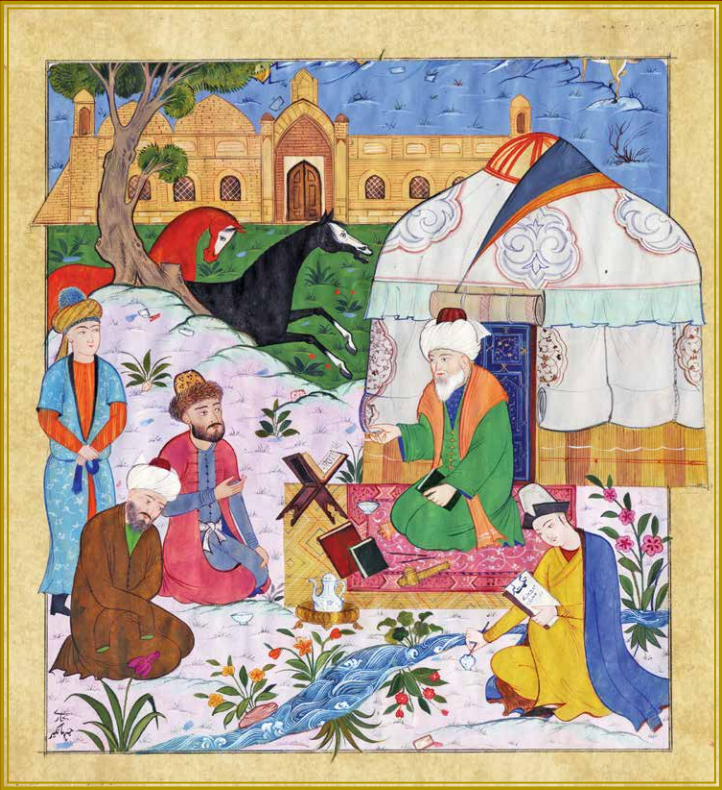
- A modern illustration of Ahmad Yasawi with Arystan Bab Mausoleum behind

Personal life
- Born: Ahmad ibn Ibrahim ibn Ilyas Yasawi; 486 AH | 1093 CE Sayram, Kara-Khanid Khanate
- Died: 561 AH | 1166 CE (aged 72–73) Turkistan, Kara-Khanid Khanate
- Parent: Sheikh Ibrahim (father)
- Era: Islamic Golden Age
- Notable work: Book of Wisdom
- Known for: Poetry, Sufism, Diwan in Middle Turkic

Religious life
- Religion: Sunni Islam
- Jurisprudence: Hanafi

Senior posting
- Period in office: 12th century
- Influenced by: Arslan Baba, Yusuf Hamadani
- Influenced: Yunus Emre, Haji Bektash Veli, Kockar Ata, Sarı Saltık, Magtymguly Pyragy, Idries Shah, Yahya Kemal Beyatlı

Ahmad Yasawi (Kazakh: Қожа Ахмет Ясауи, romanized: Qoja Ahmet Iasaui, قوجا احمەت ياساۋى; Persian: خواجه احمد یسوی, romanized: Khwāje Ahmad-e Yasavī; 1093–1166) was a Turkic poet and Sufi, an early mystic who exerted a powerful influence on the development of Sufi orders throughout the Turkic-speaking world. Yasawi is the earliest known Turkic poet who composed poetry in Middle Turkic. He was a pioneer of popular mysticism, founded the first Turkic Sufi order, the Yasawiyya or Yeseviye, which very quickly spread over Turkic-speaking areas. He was a Hanafi scholar like his murshid (spiritual guide), Yusuf Hamadani.

== Early life ==
Ahmed Yesevi was born to Ibrahim in Sayram at the end of the 11th century. His father was Sheikh Ibrahim ibn Ilyas ibn Mahmed. Ahmed lost his father at the age of seven and was then raised by Arslan Baba. By then, Yasawi had already advanced through a series of high spiritual stages and, under the direction of Arslan Baba, the young Ahmad reached a high level of maturity and slowly began to win fame from every quarter. His father Ibrahim had already been renowned in that region for performing countless feats and many legends were told of him. Consequently, it was recognized that, with respect to his lineage as well, this quiet and unassuming young boy, who always listened to his elder sister, held a spiritually important position.

Yesevi later moved to Bukhara and followed his studies with Yusuf Hamadani. Upon the demise of Yusuf Hamdani, first ʻAbdullah Barki and then Hassan-i Andākī became the head of Hamadani's khanqah. Yasawi became the head murshid of the Naqshbandi order when Hassan-i Andākī died in 1160. He then turned this position to Abdul Khaliq Ghijduwani under Hamadani's advice and moved to Turkistan City in order to spread Islam in Turkestan.

=== Ancestry ===
According to traditions, his father, Sheikh Ibrahim Ibn Ilyas Ibn Mahmed, was a noted Hanafi scholar of Isfijab and was likewise considered to be a descendant of Ali.

Genealogical traditions preserved in the Nasabnama state that Ahmad Yassawi was the thirteenth generation descendant of Ishaq Bab, a prominent early Islamic figure who is said to have arrived in Turkestan during the early eight century to promote Islam. The term Bab refers to a guide or master.

== Influence ==
Ahmad Yasawi made considerable efforts to spread Islam throughout Central Asia and had numerous students in the region. Yasawi's poems created a new genre of religious folk poetry in Central Asian Turkic literature and influenced many religious poets in the following countries. Yasawi turned the city of Iasy into the major centre of learning for the Kazakh Steppe, then retired to a life of contemplation at the age of 63. He dug himself an underground cell where he spent the rest of his life.

Turkish scholar Hasan Basri Çantay noted: "It was a Seljuk king who brought Rumi, the great Sufi poet, to Konya; and it was in Seljuq times that Ahmed Yasawi, another great Sufi, lived and taught. The influence of those two remarkable teachers has continued to the present." Yasawi is also mentioned by Edward Campbell (writing as Ernest Scott) as a member of the Khwajagan. Yasawi also influenced Turkish poet Yahya Kemal Beyatlı, he said: "Who is this Ahmad Yasawi? If you study him, you will find our nationality in Him."

== Poetry ==
Yasawi's most famous poetic work is undoubtedly his Dīwān-i Hikmat (Compendium of Wisdom), which was handed down from generation to generation. In his compendium, Yasawi denounces social injustice, violence and calls for patience and humility, as well as reliance on the will of Allah.

The following example is an excerpt from Yasawi's Dīwān-i Hikmat, transliterated into Latin script and translated into English.

Endi adoshdim dostlar, kelgan yolimdan.
Turgan davlatlarim ketdi qolimdan,
Ayrildim dostlar yolghiz gulimdan,
Hechkim qutilmas faryod olimdan,
Hechkim qutilmas dostlar jallod olimdan

Now I have lost my way, oh friends!
All my wealth and riches have slipped through my fingers!
I have parted, my friends, with my one and only flower - my Rose,
No one can save themselves from their death,
No one, my friends, can save themselves from their death.

== Legends about Ahmed Yasawi ==
=== Date palm ===
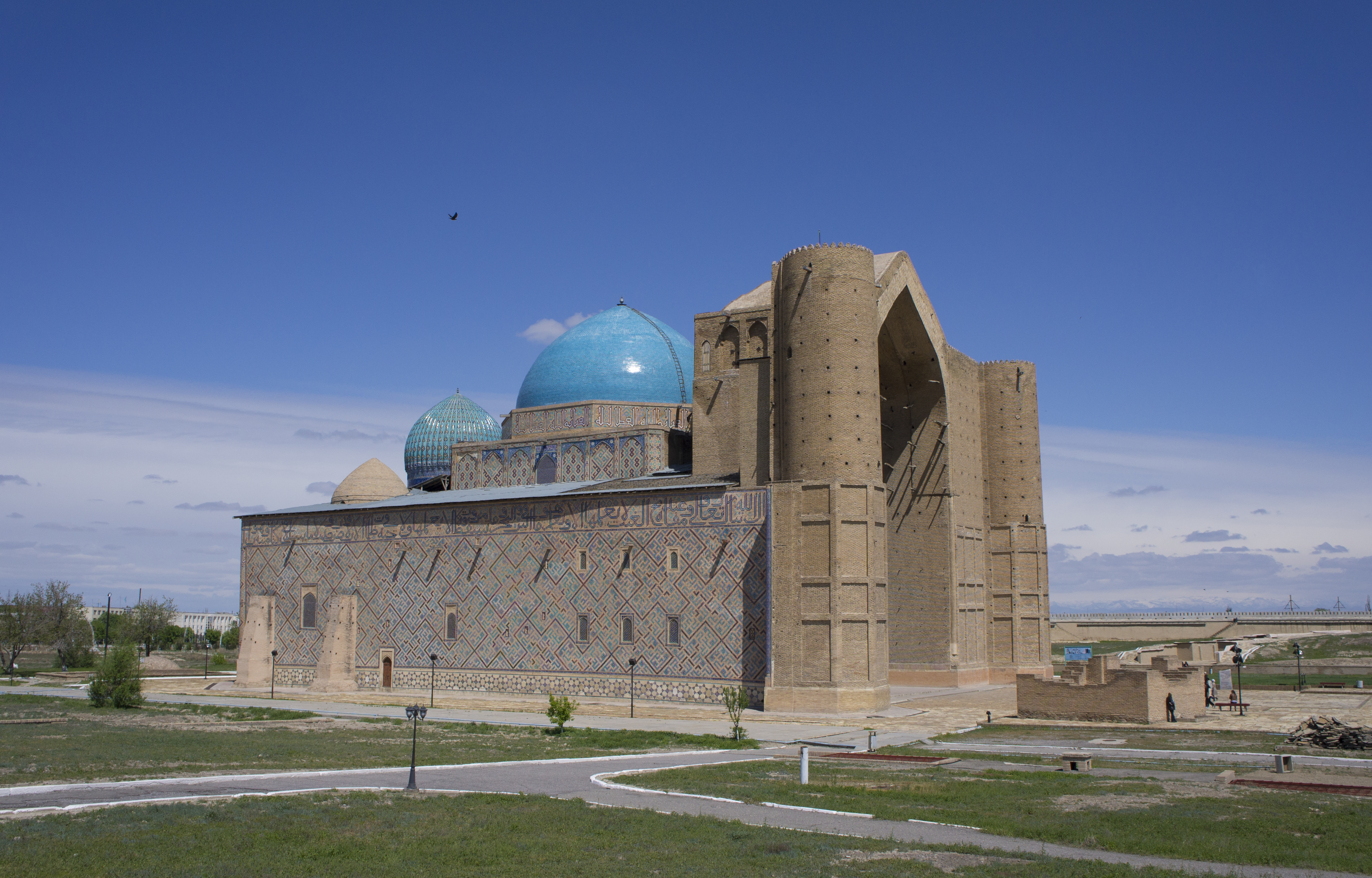
The Mausoleum of Ahmed Yasawi

Legend has it that a religious mystic, Arystan-Bab (also known as Arslan Baba), was the teacher and spiritual mentor of Khoja Ahmad Yasawi. It was Arystan-Bab who transmitted the amanat (trustworthiness, noble quality), which was contained in a pip of date palm. According to the legend, Arystan-Bab was an associate of the Islamic prophet Muhammad. One day, Muhammad and his companions were resting and eating dates when suddenly one of the fruits fell out of the dish. Simultaneously, Muhammad heard the revelation: "This date is for the Muslim Ahmad, who will be born 400 years later than You." Muhammad asked his companions who would pass this persimmon to its future owner, but no one volunteered. Muhammad then repeated his question, and finally Arystan-Bab replied: "If you beg Allah to give me 400 years of life, then I will pass this date."

=== Timur's dream ===
According to legend, Ahmad Yasawi predicted Timur in his dream (who lived two centuries after him) glad tidings of the forthcoming conquest of Bukhara. Taking this as a sign, Timur went on a campaign that would indeed be successful. After his victory, he decided to visit the grave of Yasawi and ordered to build there a majestic mausoleum.

== Legacy ==
Yasawi is celebrated as a spiritual teacher all throughout Central Asia, Turkey, & Greater Persia. The people of Kazakhstan, a secular country that was also the birthplace of Yasawi, have built numerous monuments and have honored him in many other ways as well, including:

- The Mausoleum of Khoja Ahmed Yasawi was later built on the site of his grave by Timur in Turkistan City. The Yesevi order he founded continued to be influential for several centuries afterwards, with the Yesevi Sayyid Ata Sheikhs holding a prominent position at the court of Bukhara into the 19th century. There is the greatest influence of shamanistic elements in the Yasawiyya compared to other Sufi orders.
- Yesevi authored the Book of Wisdom (Turkic: ديوان حكمت, Dīvān-i Ḥikmet), a collection of poems, in Turkic. The book was published in 1895 and 1905 in Kazan.
- The Naqshbandi Idries Shah mentions Yasawi's lineage in The Book of the Book.
- The first Kazakh-Turkish university, Ahmet Yassawi University, was named in his honor.

== Two Persian Treatises ==
In addition to the Fakhr-nāma, two short Persian treatises are attributed to Ahmad Yasawi. The content of these treatises closely resembles Yasawi’s Turkic works and was likely either written by him or compiled by his disciples from his teachings.

- 1. Treatise on the Etiquette of the Path (رساله در آداب طریقت): Copies of this treatise, found in Tashkent, address topics such as the etiquette and stations of the spiritual path, the relationship between disciple and master, dervishhood, and divine love. The text organizes its discussion into six main sections: rules of the path, pillars, obligations, traditions, recommended practices, and etiquettes.
- 2. Treatise on the Forty Stations (رساله در مقامات اربعین): The only known manuscript of this work is preserved in a library in Turkey. Like the *Fakr-nāma*, it presents an exposition of the “forty stations” of the spiritual journey across four stages: Sharia, Tariqa, Ma‘rifa, and Haqiqa, assigning ten stations to each.

Although these two Persian treatises do not always display the precision of hadith scholars in their references to prophetic traditions, they remain significant sources for understanding Ahmad Yasawi’s intellectual world.

=== In popular culture ===
The Turkish series Mavera (2021) is based on Ahmad Yasawi's life. In the series, he was portrayed by the Turkish actor Korel Cezayirli.
