= Sheikh Hovendi at-Tahur Complex =

Coordinates: 41°19′22.4″N 69°15′32.0″E

- Shayx Xovandi Tohur majmuasi
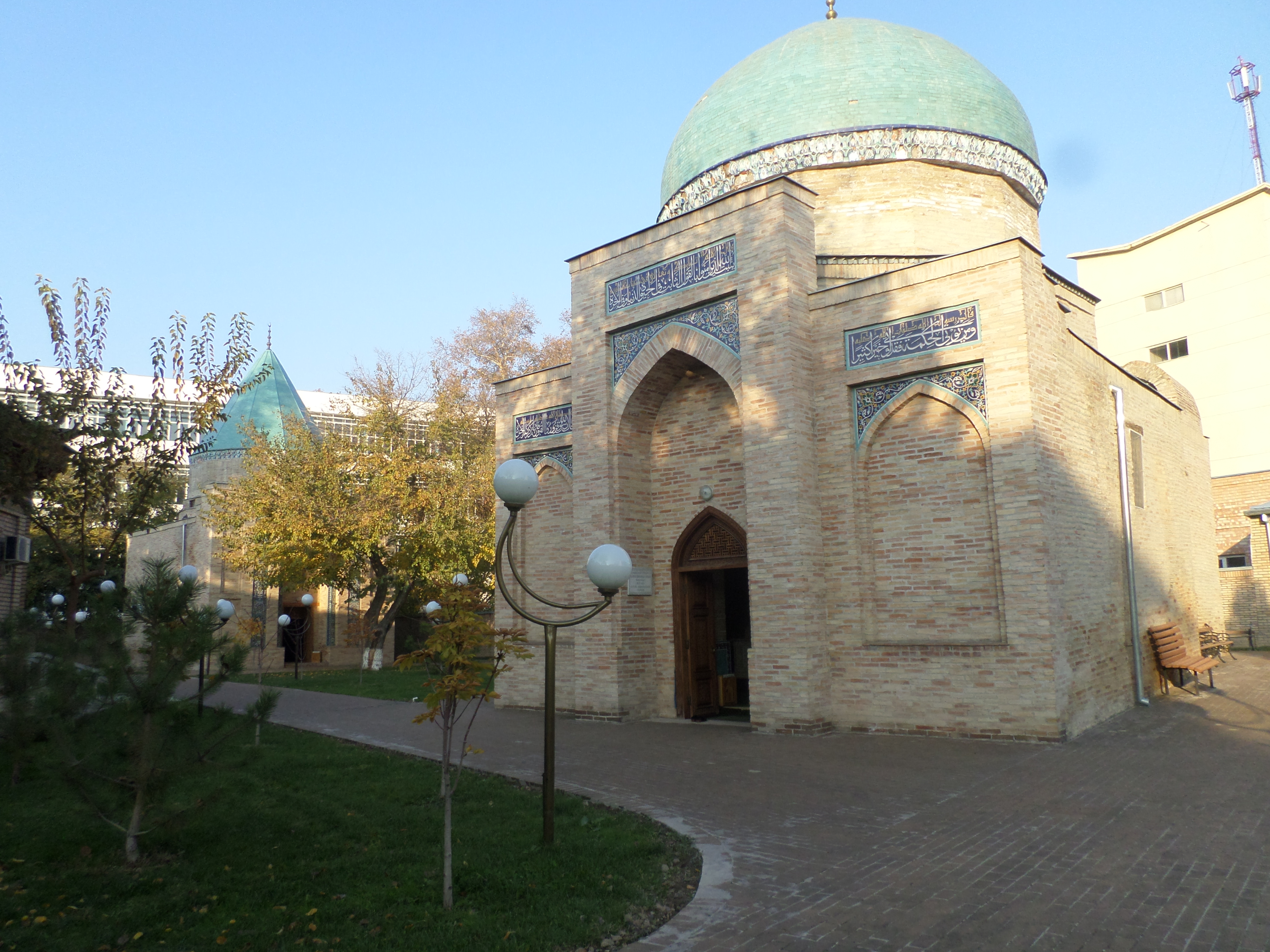
- Sheikh Hovendi at-Tahur Complex
- Interactive map of the Sheikh Hovendi at-Tahur Complex area
- Alternative names: Sheikhantaur mausoleum

General information
- Type: Architectural complex
- Location: Tashkent, Uzbekistan, Tashkent, Uzbekistan
- Named for: Sheikh Hovendi at-Tahur (Sheikhantaur)
- Years built: 14th century (Sheikhantaur Mausoleum), 15th century (Kaldyrgach-biy Mausoleum), 15th century (Yunus Khan Mausoleum)

Height
- Height: 12.8 m (42 ft)

The Sheikh Hovendi at-Tahur Complex (other names: Sheikhantaur mausoleum; Uzbek: Shayx Xovandi Tohur majmuasi) is an architectural complex, centered around the Mausoleum of Sheikh Hovendi at-Tahur (Sheikhantaur). It is one of the most important architectural monuments of Tashkent, Uzbekistan. It is located in the center of Tashkent in the quadrangle formed by the streets of Alisher Navoi, Shaykhantohur and Abdulla Kadiri.

== Biography of Sheikh Hovendi at-Tahur ==
Sheikh Hovendi at-Tahur was born in the 13th century. He was a Sayyid - a descendant of Muhammad. His father, Sheikh Omar, was a direct descendant in the seventeenth generation of the second righteous caliph Omar ibn al-Khattab, therefore the men in Sheikh Omar's family bore the honorary title of Khwaja (uzbek: xo'ja). Sheikh Omar was an initiated Sufi, a follower of the dervish Hasan Bulghari. He arrived in Tashkent with the sole purpose of spreading Islam. Soon Sheikh Omar moved to the mountain village of Bogiston, where he spent the rest of his life. Here Sheikh Hovendi at-Tahur (Sheikhantaur) was born. The young Sheikhantaur received initiation among the dervishes of the city of Yassy, where the cult of the Sufi Sheikh and founder of the order Khwaja Ahmad Yasawi was already widespread at that time. After a long period of travels in Mawarannahr, Sheikhantaur arrived in Tashkent, where he remained in the memory of people as "the wisest of the wise". The Sheikh died between 1355 and 1360.

== Legends about the history of the origin of the Sheikhantaur complex ==
According to written sources, in the 5th-8th centuries, the local population of Chach practiced Zoroastrianism. On the territory occupied by the architectural complex of Sheikhantaur, there were several hauzes (pools of water), as water was also one of the images of worship in Zoroastrianism. Also among the local pre-Islamic population there was a cult of worshiping long-lived trees. Apparently, the alley of saurs was an alley of cult trees.

According to legends, Sheikh at-Tahur, having made a journey to the city of Turkestan, where he learned the mystical philosophy of Ahmad Yasawi, studying patience and meekness, after many years of wandering returned to Tashkent and settled near the holy spring, about which a beautiful legend was composed in ancient times. According to this legend, from this spring flowed the water of "eternal life", and on its shore, in the shade of trees, rested Iskander Dvurogiy (Iskander Zulkarnay), that is, Alexander the Great. According to legend, in pre-Islamic times there was a pagan temple of Water and Fire near this spring. Here he bequeathed to bury himself Sheikh at-Tahur (Havendi Tahur from Bogustan), who died in 1355. For a long time, the so-called saurs of Iskander - thousand-year-old, leafless and almost petrified from old age trees grew near his grave. The trunk of one of these trees has survived to this day inside the mausoleum of Sheikhantaur, near his grave.

=== Chronology of the construction of architectural monuments and structures on the territory of the complex ===
The first built mausoleum during the reign of the Timurid dynasty was the mausoleum of Sheikh Hovendi at-Tahur of Bogustan (Sheikhantaur), who died in 1355.

At the end of the 15th century, there were built a chillyakhona, the mausoleum of Kaldyrgach-biy and the mausoleum of Yunus Khan of Mogulistan.

In 1892, the chortoq and madrasah Ishan Kuli-dadh, shown in the above photo, were built.

In 1908-1910 Khojimat-Ishan of Namangan built Aurat Mosque with a minaret.

In 1913, a minaret was built near the mausoleum of Yunus Khan.

In addition, there were more mausoleum of Kuktellik-ata and mausoleum of Kaba. There were also several neighborhood frame mosques: the Zandzhirlik mosque at the entrance to the complex, and the Garib and Said Azimbay mosques on the sides of Yunus Khan's mausoleum.

In 1932, the Khatun Mosque, built in 1754, was moved to the complex from the "old town". In the 80s another mosque was moved from the "old city" to the territory of the complex. Currently, it partially houses the Islamic University.

At the entrance to the Sheikhantaur cemetery there was a hauz (reservoir) Lyangar.

There were several chortoqs on the territory of the complex - one near the 15th century Kuchkar-ata mausoleum, one inside the cemetery and one built in 1892 at the entrance to the complex. From the chortoq at the mausoleum of Kuchkar-ata to the mausoleum of Sheikhantaur there was a path - gisht yul, located below the main ground level, along which there was an alley of ancient saur (saira tree of tui species). In 1980s, it was a flower garden running from Navoi Street to the mausoleum of Yunus Khan.

Also on the territory of Sheikhantaur complex grew several 500-year-old chinar trees. At the mausoleum of Kuchkar-ata there was a caragach tree covered with goat horns.

Also until the beginning of the XX century on the territory of Sheikhantaur complex there were frame pavilions, oshkhona (dining room), chaykhona (tea-houses), dukan stalls for selling flatbread and sweets, as well as stalls for spectacles during holidays.

Since 1924 the cemetery was closed and almost all the buildings on the territory of the complex were demolished.

In 1947 the 1892 chortak was dismantled, in 1964 the remains of the Ishankul-dakht madrasah, which in Soviet times housed a movie studio, were dismantled. In 1967, the Khatun Mosque, which served as a library, was dismantled.

The mausoleum of Sheikhantaur was repaired in 1910–1920 at the expense of Sheikh Hojimat-Ishan: the dome was repaired and covered with iron.

In Soviet times, the mausoleum of Kaldyrgach-biy was located on the territory of a souvenir factory. The domes of the mausoleum were restored in the 1970s under the project of architect V. M. Filimonov.

In the 1950s-1960s the Central Asian restoration workshops were located in the premises of the Yunus Khan Mausoleum, so the building of the mausoleum was constantly repaired. In 1980–1981, the general restoration of the mausoleum building was carried out according to the project of architect M. I. Burshtein.

== Sheikhantaur Mausoleum ==
The mausoleum (mazar) of Sheikhantaur changed its appearance several times after it was built in the 14th century. Inside the mazar, next to the tombstone, there is a unique, preserved to this day, petrified sacred Saur of Iskander. Saurs are coniferous trees of local breed. Around the mausoleum there was a whole grove of such saurs, which were lifeless already in the 15th century. It is believed that their origin is associated with the name of Alexander the Great, who is highly revered in the East as a mythical hero or Pahlavan. Perhaps it was because of these memorable coniferous trees that this place was chosen for the burial of Sheikhantaur. The dimensions of the mausoleum are: width - 16.2x9 m, height - 12.8 m.

== Burial complex of Sheikhantaur ==
The Sheikhantaur cemetery was the most popular holy place in Tashkent in the 16th century, where the local aristocracy was buried. The burial complex began to form in the suburbs, among the estates of wealthy townspeople.

Over time, a whole funeral complex was formed around the mausoleum of Sheikhantaur. The complex and the urban district around it (locally mahalla) received the name Sheikhantaur. Many outstanding personalities who left their mark on the history of Tashkent were buried here. One of them was Yunus Khodja, who was first the khokim (head of the mahalla) of Sheikhantaur, and then the ruler of Tashkent, when in the 18th century Tashkent was a semi-independent city-state. Another outstanding personality buried here was Alimkul Parvarchi - a Kokand general who defended Tashkent from the Russian troops in 1864–1865, but was fatally wounded on May 9, 1865, during a two-hour battle near Tashkent during an attempt to counterattack the troops of General M. G. Chernyaev, who besieged Tashkent. His death, among other reasons, contributed to the fact that General M. G. Chernyaev captured Tashkent as a result of the storm on June 16, 1865.

By the beginning of the 20th century, it was already a huge complex of monuments, including domed gates, hauzes, mosques, mausoleums and madrasas.

Only 3 (out of 16) monuments of the Sheikhantuara burial complex have survived to this day. In addition to the Sheikhantaur Mausoleum, the Kaldyrgach-biy Mausoleum and the Yunus Khan Mausoleum have been preserved.

== Kaldyrgach-biy Mausoleum ==
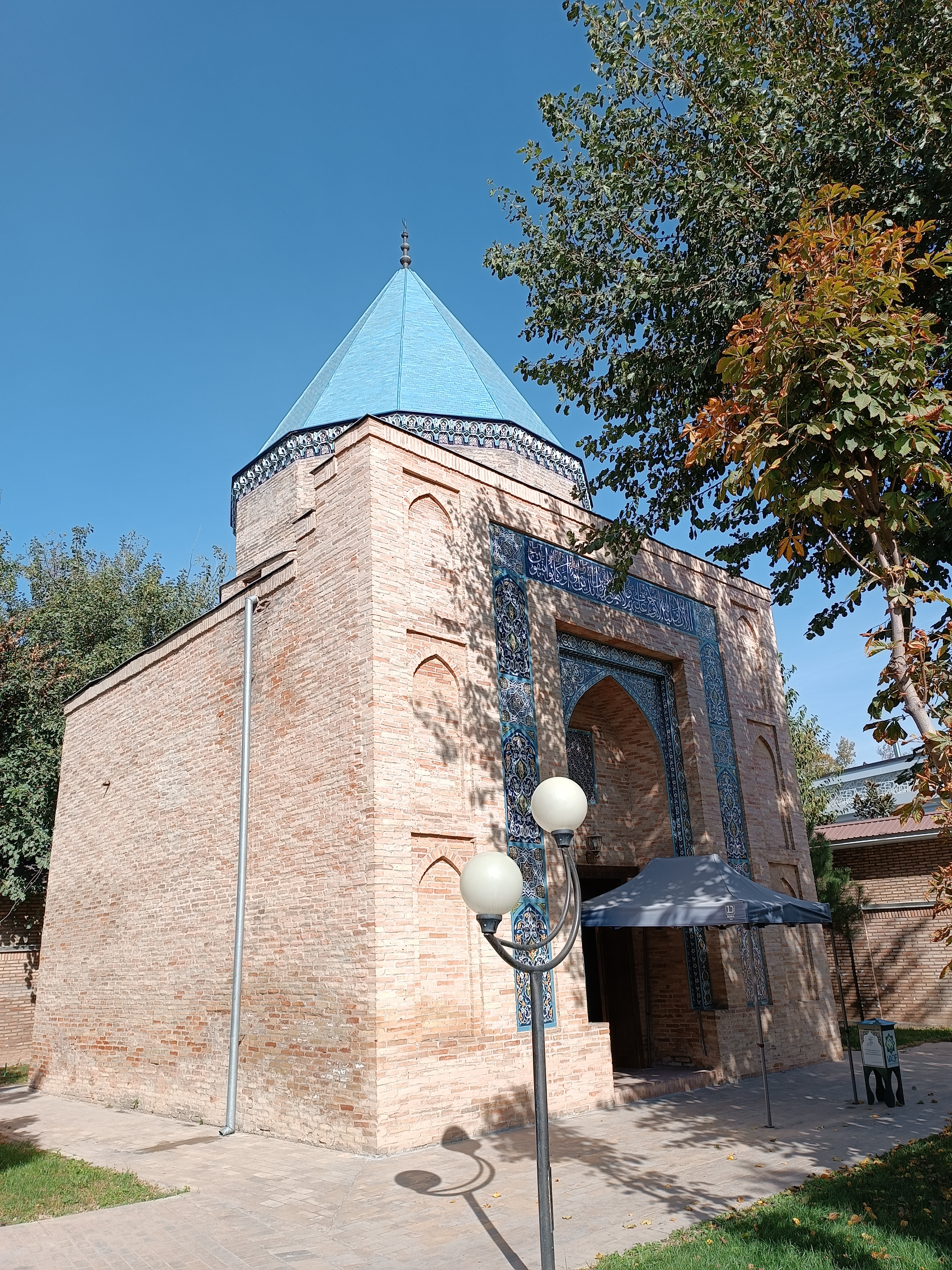
Kaldyrgach-biy Mausoleum

The date of construction of the mausoleum complex of Kaldyrgach-biy on the territory of the Sheikhantaur complex dates back to the first half of the 15th century.

The building of the Kaldyrgach-biy Mausoleum has a pyramidal dome, which is unusual for Uzbekistan. Tole-bi (Kaldyrgach-biy) was a legendary judge from the Dulat tribe. The mausoleum was built in the first half of the 15th century. The courtyard and artistic decoration of the mausoleum have not been preserved. Dimensions: 9.5 x 9.5 meters, room: 6 x 6 meters.

== Yunus Khan Mausoleum ==
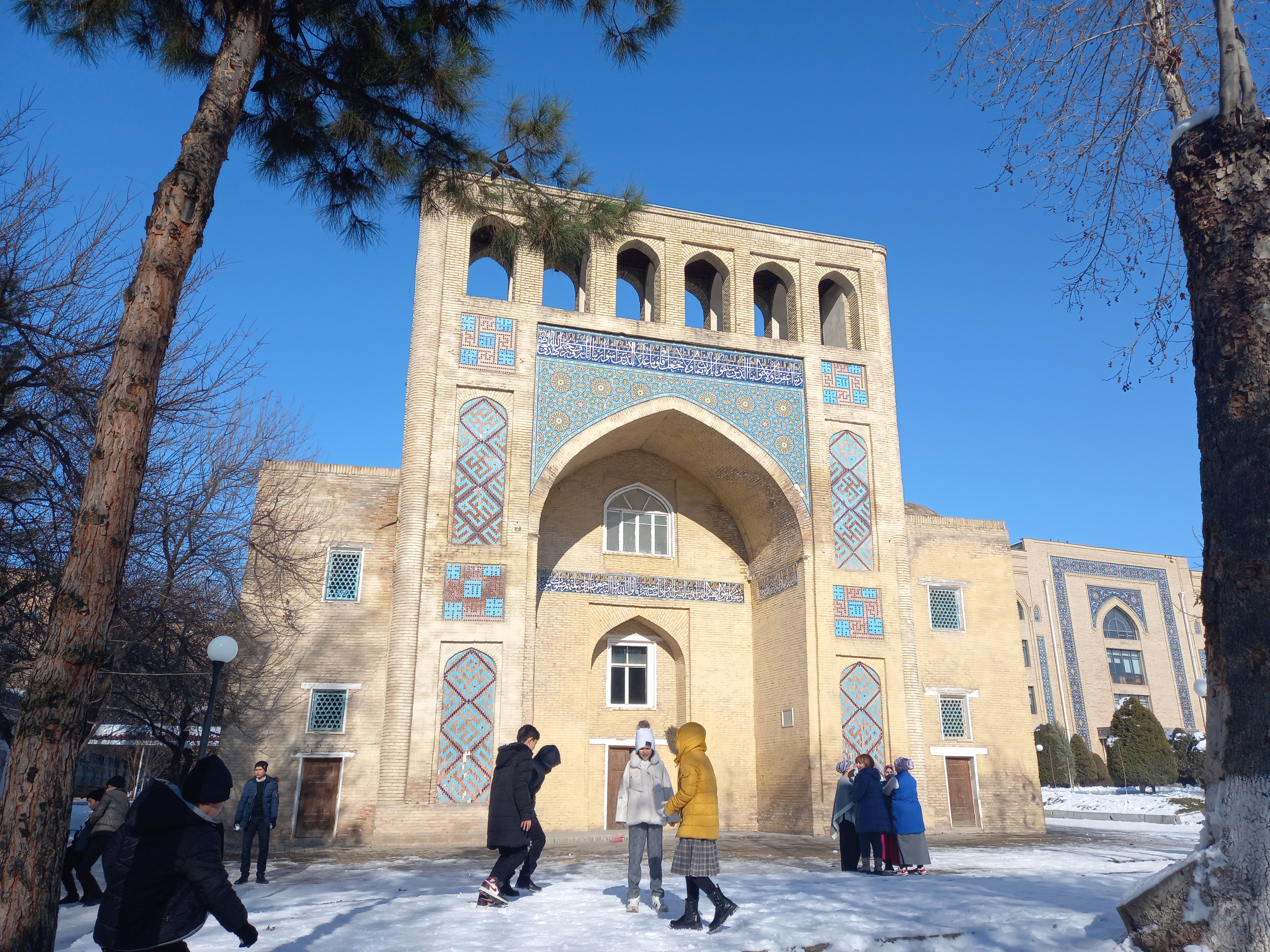
Yunus Khan mausoleum

The mausoleum of Yunus Khan is located near the mausoleum of Sheikhantaur. It is one of the two monumental buildings built in the 15th century that have survived to this day. Yunus Khan Moghulistan (1415–1487) was one of the rulers of Tashkent.
