= Eleven Naqshbandi principles =

Spiritual practices

The Eleven Naqshbandi principles or the "rules or secrets of the Naqshbandi", known in Persian as the kalimat-i qudsiya ("sacred words" or "virtuous words"), are a system of principles and guidelines used as spiritual exercises, or to encourage certain preferred states of being, in the Naqshbandi Sufi order of Islamic mysticism.

== Background ==
There were originally eight principles formulated by the Central Asian Sufi teacher Abdul Khaliq Gajadwani (died 1179), the last three of the eleven being added later by Baha-ud-Din Naqshband Bukhari (1318–1389), founder of the Naqshbandi Order. Both were Khwajagan (Masters) of the Sufi tariqah (path, way or method).

These principles are designed to be borne in mind and used as spiritual practices or exercises in the Naqshbandi system of spiritual development. They are carried out under individual tuition, expertly prescribed, monitored for changes, and carefully adjusted by a teacher, rather than being automatically performed.

The principles have been brought to the attention of contemporary Western audiences through the works of the writers Idries Shah, John G. Bennett, Omar Ali-Shah and J. Spencer Trimingham. The exercises were an important aspect of Omar Ali-Shah's work with groups in the modern Naqshbandi tradition in the West. For instance, one of Ali-Shah's books of edited transcripts, The Rules or Secrets of the Naqshbandi Order, was devoted to this subject.

== The Eleven principles ==
The Eleven principles are as follows, shown in the order used by Idries Shah in A Perfumed Scorpion, which differs slightly (in items 5 to 8) from the order presented by Omar Ali-Shah:

1. Hush dar dam (or hosh dar dam) — awareness of breathing

Being aware or conscious of one's breathing. Breathing deeply in a natural rhythm without being preoccupied by breathing. Inhaling and exhaling whilst in remembrance of God.

2. Nazar ba kadam (or nazar bar qadam) — watching over the steps

Watching over one's steps, ie being aware of one's intention. Paying attention and not being distracted from one's goal, maintaining awareness and being open to opportunities, so that one does the right thing at the right time.

3. Safar dar watan — travelling in the Homeland

Making an interior journey, ie inside oneself, observing oneself in a detached and not overly-critical manner, learning from one's errors and travelling from blameworthy to praiseworthy qualities.

4. Khilwat dar anjuman (or khalwat dar anjuman) — retirement in company

Developing the ability to detach from and distance oneself from external noise, disturbance and confusion when in company, and remain tranquil, perhaps with the aid of a zikr, an exercise in remembrance of God. Also being able to re-attach one's attention to the outward when necessary. Though outwardly the Sufi is in the world, inwardly he or she is with God.

5. Yad kardan (or yad kard) — remembering, recollecting exercises

Remembering experiences one has had and that one is a part of the Tradition from which one may draw positive energy and derive strength. Using inner or vocalized zikr, remembrance or "making mention" of the Divine names, to remain attentive and alert, and so that the heart becomes aware of the presence of Truth (Al Haqq).

6. Baaz gasht (or baz gasht) — restraint

Being self-disciplined, for example cultivating the quality of patience, keeping one's thoughts from straying when repeating the Shahada (the declaration of the Oneness of God and the acceptance of Muhammad as his prophet), being repentant and returning to righteousness.

7. Neegar dashtan (or nigah dasht) — watchfulness, use of special faculties

Concentrating on the presence of God. Being alert, watchful for and open to subtle perceptions, positive energy, positive opportunity and positive impacts. Being watchful over passing thoughts.

8. Yad dashtan (or yad dasht) — keeping of the memory, sensing of the being and the body

Sensing one's being and one's body, recalling positive memories and positive experiences.

9. Ukufi zamani (or wuquf-e zamani) — time-halt (or pause)

Suspending intellect, judgement, preconceptions and conditioned thought. Reprising one's thoughts and actions. Accounting for how one's time is spent, being thankful for acts of righteousness and asking forgiveness for wrongdoing.

10. Ukufi adadi (or wuquf-e adadi) — number-halt (or pause)

Carrying out exercises involving numbers, such as the awareness of the number of repetitions when carrying out one's silent heart zikr exercise, and also certain forms of counting using the Abjad system.

11. Ukufi qalbi (or wuquf-e qalbi) — heart-halt (or pause) or visualisation

Visualising one's heart (Qalb), perhaps with the name of God inscribed on it, and identifying with Truth or with God.

== See also ==
- Abdul Khaliq Gajadwani
- Baha-ud-Din Naqshband Bukhari
- Spiritual practice
