= Xi yu fan guo zhi =

Report by a diplomatic envoy

Xiyu Fanguo Zhi (Chinese: 西域番國志; lit. "Records of Honourable Countries of the Western Regions") was a report submitted by the Ming dynasty envoy Chen Cheng to the Yongle Emperor about the eighteen countries and territories he traveled through during 1414–1415 as a member of an embassy contingency to the Timurid Empire in Central Asia.

== Contents ==
Xi Yu Fan Guo Zhi consists of 18 chapters:

- Herat
- Samarkand
- Andkud
- Balkh
- Termez
- Shahrokhia
- Sayram
- Tashkent
- Bukhara
- Kesh
- Yanghikend
- Bishbalik
- Turpan
- Ya Er
- Yamshi
- Khocho
- Lukchun
- Kumul

== English translation ==
There is no complete translation of the Xi Yu Fan Guo Zhi, however, there is an English translation of the first chapter:

- Morris Rossabi: "A Translation of Ch'en Ch'eng's Hsi-Yü Fan-Kuo Chih", Ming Studies, 17 (1983): 49–59.
