= Meetings with Remarkable Men =

Book by George Gurdjieff

- First UK edition
- Author: G. I. Gurdjieff
- Translator: A. R. Orage
- Language: Russian (original)
- Publisher: Routledge & Kegan Paul (UK), E. P. Dutton (US)
- English publication date: 1963
- ISBN: 0140190376 Penguin (Non-Classics)
- Preceded by: Beelzebub's Tales to His Grandson (1950)
- Followed by: Life is Real Only Then, When 'I Am' (1974)

Meetings with Remarkable Men, autobiographical in nature, is the second volume of the All and Everything trilogy written by the Greek-Armenian spiritual teacher G. I. Gurdjieff. Gurdjieff started working on the Russian manuscript in 1927, revising it several times over the coming years. An English translation by A. R. Orage was first published in 1963.

== Overview ==
The book takes the form of Gurdjieff's reminiscences about various "remarkable men" that he met, beginning with his father. They include the Armenian priest Pogossian; his friend Soloviev, and Prince Lubovedsky, a Russian prince with metaphysical interests.

In the course of describing these characters, Gurdjieff weaves their stories into the story of his own travels, and also into an overarching narrative which has them cooperate in locating spiritual texts and/or masters in various lands (mostly Central Asia). Gurdjieff calls this group the "Seekers of Truth".

Most of them do in fact find truth in the form of some suitable spiritual destiny. The underlying philosophy, especially as articulated in an appendix, amounts to the assertion that people generally live their lives asleep, are unconscious of themselves and, accordingly, behave like machines subject to outside causes and pressures. Also, one of the chief assessments of the novel is that the people of the past epochs lived in more suitable outer conditions and at higher inner levels than the people today. Many additional hidden harmonies are noted or alluded to.

Claims that seem to contradict modern beliefs have inspired some to question the book's "autobiographical" character. For example, Gurdjieff claims to have first heard the Epic of Gilgamesh as an oral epic sung from memory by his father; to have made contact with various ancient brotherhoods including the Sarmoung Brotherhood; to have copied a map of "pre-sand Egypt"; and to have witnessed a number of miracles and esoteric phenomena. However, it has since been accepted that North Africa goes through a 21,000 year climate cycle that would have produced a "pre-sand Egypt" during the period from approximately 9,000 to 3,500 BCE.

It may be argued that many of the vignettes in Meetings are meant to be symbolic, or "teaching stories".

== Adaptations ==
The book was adapted into a film, Meetings with Remarkable Men, in 1979 by Peter Brook.
