= Sarmoung Brotherhood =

Alleged esoteric Sufi brotherhood based in Asia

The Sarmoung Brotherhood was an alleged esoteric Sufi brotherhood based in Asia. The reputed existence of the brotherhood was brought to light in the writings of George Gurdjieff, a Greek-Armenian spiritual teacher. Some contemporary Sufi-related sources also claim to have made contact with the group although the earliest and primary source is Gurdjieff himself, leading most scholars to conclude the group was fictional.

== Name ==
According to the author John G. Bennett, a student and aide of George Gurdjieff who first mentioned the concept, the word sarmoung uses the Armenian pronunciation of the Persian term sarman, which may mean either "he who preserves the doctrine of Zoroaster" or "bee".

Regarding the meaning, Bennett writes:

"The word can be interpreted in three ways. It is the word for bee, which has always been a symbol of those who collect the precious 'honey' of traditional wisdom and preserve it for further generations. A collection of legends, well known in Armenian and Syrian circles with the title of The Bees, was revised by Mar Salamon, a Nestorian Archimandrite in the thirteenth century. "The Bees" refers to a mysterious power transmitted from the time of Zoroaster and made manifest in the time of Christ.... Man is Persian meaning as the quality transmitted by heredity and hence a distinguished family or race. It can be the repository of an heirloom or tradition. The word sar means head, both literally and in the sense of principal or chief. The combination sarman would thus mean the chief repository of the tradition." Yet another possibility was "those whose heads have been purified", in other words: the enlightened.

== Gurdjieff's account ==
The brotherhood was also sought by George Gurdjieff on his journeys (pre-1912) through Southwest and Central Asia. Describing the contents of an old letter written by a monk which he had obtained, Gurdjieff writes:

"Our worthy Father Telvant has at last succeeded in learning the truth about the Sarmoung Brotherhood. Their organisation actually did exist near the town of Siranoush, and fifty years ago, soon after the migration of peoples, they also migrated and settled in the valley of Izrumin, three days journey from Nivssi...." Then the letter went on about other matters.

What struck us most was the word "Sarmoung", which we had come across several times in the book called "Merkhavat". This word is the name of a famous esoteric school which, according to tradition, was founded in Babylon as far back as 2500 BC, and which was known to have existed somewhere in Mesopotamia up to the sixth or seventh century AD; but about its further existence one could not obtain anywhere the least information.

This school was said to have possessed great knowledge, containing the key to many secret mysteries

Many times had Pogossian and I talked of this school and dreamed of finding out something authentic about it, and now suddenly we found it mentioned in this parchment! We were greatly excited.

Gurdjieff goes on to relate the Sarmoung to the Nestorians, descendants of the ancient Byzantine, their expulsion from Mesopotamia and the city of Ninevah.

Gurdjieff's experiences on these journeys, and a sketchy account of his somewhat mysterious relationship with the Sarmoung Brotherhood, can be found in his autobiography Meetings with Remarkable Men. He says that he made contact with a representative of the Sarmoung through a friend, the Dervish Bogga Eddin (Bahauddin), in Bukhara. The chief monastery of the society was said to be located somewhere in the heart of Asia, about twelve days' journey from Bukhara by horse and donkey. Once he arrived at the monastery, Gurdjieff discovered that his old friend Prince Lubovedsky was already there. The Prince tells Gurdjieff that he had met a representative of the Sarmoung at the house of the Aga Khan in Kabul, Afghanistan. During his stay at the monastery, Gurdjieff recalls seeing a complex and ancient tree-like apparatus used to indicate bodily postures and train temple dancers.

Gurdjieff's attempts to establish a link between the Brotherhood, ancient Sumer, and even "pre-sand Egypt", was an intriguing attempt at acquiring esoteric knowledge that had been passed down from antiquity.

== Major Martin's account ==
According to Account of the Sarmoun Brotherhood (1966, 1982) by Major Desmond R. Martin, a major centre of the contemporary Sarmoun Brotherhood was in the Hindu Kush mountains of northern Afghanistan. Major Martin was an associate of the writer and Sufi teacher, Idries Shah.

In the account, the motto of the Sarmouni is said to be "Work produces a Sweet Essence" (Amal misazad yak zaati shirin), work being not only work for God and for others but also self-work. In relation to this, it is maintained that just as the bee accumulates honey, so the Sarmouni accumulate, store and preserve what they term "true knowledge" (which is equally seen as existing as a positive commodity and associated with the spiritual gift or energy of Baraka). In times of need this is released once more into the world through specially trained emissaries. He describes a tree-like, multi jointed apparatus, similar to one described by Gurdjieff, and also a "No-Koonja" or nine-pointed figure, similar to Gurdjieff's Enneagram. The account hints that the central Asian activities of the Sarmoun are to be shut down and the organisation shifted to the west, and mentions an absent chief of the order, the Surkaur, who lives in a place called Aubshaur or "waterfall" (Another account of a visit to a remote monastery, published anonymously in The Times, links the Sarkar to Idries Shah). Martin's account ends with a description of a symbolic ritual whose theme is the revival of the "dead letter" of traditional teaching.

== O. M. Burke's and Idries Shah's accounts ==
A lengthy account of an encounter with the Sarmouni is given in Among the Dervishes (1973) by Omar Michael Burke, an associate of (or pen name of) Idries Shah. He takes the term "Sarmouni" to be synonymous with the Amudaria dervishes. He describes the Sarmouni as a diffuse set of groups, rather than being located in a single monastery. Some groups have no permanent headquarters and meet in the open or private houses. In some cases, whole villages blend Sarmouni practices with their day-to-day lives. He describes them as having a practical orientation, and avoiding mystification and personality-cults. They occasionally display extrasensory perceptions, but do not attribute great significance to them. He reports meeting a nonagenarian with memories of "Jurjizada" (Gurdjieff). He also says they owe their allegiance to the "Studious King" (a literal translation of Idries Shah's name), and agrees with Major Martin that their teaching has been exported and adapted to the West. (He mentions the Azimiyya, a modern international Sufi order).

== Other accounts ==
In Studies in Comparative Religion (Winter 1974), it is said that according to the Armenian book Merkhavat, the Sarmoung Brotherhood, also referred to as the 'Inner Circle of Humanity', originated in ancient Babylon circa 2500 BC, at around the time the Egyptians built the Great Pyramid of Giza. The Ouspensky Foundation state that the brotherhood was active in the golden Babylonian time of Hammurabi (1728-1686 BC) and is connected with Zoroaster, the teacher of Pythagoras (born c. 580 BC–572 BC, died c. 500 BC–490 BC). According to the Foundation, Pythagoras stayed for twelve years in Babylon. (Merkabah mysticism is in fact a form of Jewish esotericism, which Gurdjieff possibly encountered in an Armenian translation).

In The Masters of Wisdom, J. G. Bennett states that the Sarman left Babylon before the arrival of the Alexander the Great (who reigned 336-323 BC), moved up the Tigris and made their headquarters in the abandoned capital of the Assyrian Kings, close to modern-day Mosul in northern Iraq.

In Gurdjieff in the Light of Tradition (2002), the Perennialist Whitall Perry wrote that Gurdjieff believed that the northern Sufi orders could well be under the hidden direction of the Khwajagan - the 'Masters of Wisdom' - themselves in turn delegated by the Sarman 'Inner Circle', the 'Assembly of the Living Saints of the Earth'.

In The People of the Secret, Edward Campbell (writing as Ernest Scott), another associate of Idries Shah, describes studies in extrasensory perception being undertaken in the contemporary Sarmoun monastery in Afghanistan.

The Canadian diplomat and Gurdjieffian James George has speculated, on the basis of the similar name and location, that Surmang, a Tibetan Buddhist monastery currently within Chinese borders may be real basis of the Sarmoung. Surmang has been more recently associated with the renowned and controversial Kagyu teacher Chogyam Trungpa. In 2007, Buddhist priest Rev. José M. Tirado presented a paper to the All & Everything Conference in Loutraki, Greece detailing the probable Buddhist influences on Gurdjieff's teachings, and linking "Sarmoun" to the Surmang monastery, in "Beelzebub's Buddhas".

== Skepticism ==
Mark Sedgwick, the coordinator of the Unit for Arab and Islamic Studies at Aarhus University writes:

Although few commentators in Gurdjieff would put it so bluntly, it seems clear to me that the Sarmoung are entirely imaginary. No Sufi tariqa of such a name is known, and in fact "Sarmoung" is a typically Gurdjieffian fantastical name. It is immediately obvious to anyone who knows anything about regular Sufism that there is nothing remotely Sufi about the Sarmoung Order described by Gurdjieff.

James Moore, in his biography of Gurdjieff, writes

Gurdjieff's claim to have found and entered 'the chief Sarmoung Monastery' is, in effect, a litmus test, distinguishing literal minds from those preferring allegory.

== See also ==
- Agartha
- Bön
- Fourth Way
- Great White Brotherhood
- Greco-Buddhist monasticism
- Gurdjieff movements
- Gymnosophists
- Khwajagan
- Magi
- Naqshbandi
- Secret Chiefs
- Shambhala
- Shangri-La
- Shramana
- Zoroastrianism

== Literature ==
- Adrian G. Gilbert, Magi: The Quest for a Secret Tradition, Bloomsbury Publishing, 1996
