= Khwajagan =

Persian title

Khwājagān (shortened/singular forms: Khwaja, Khaja(h), Khawaja or khuwaja) is a Persian title for "the Masters". Khwajagan, as the plural for "Khwāja", is often used to refer to a network of Sufis in Central Asia from the 10th to the 16th century who are often incorporated into later Naqshbandi and Khalwati hierarchies, as well as other Sufi groups, such as the Yasaviyya. In Firdowsi's Shahnama the word is used many times for some rulers and heroes of ancient Iran as well. The special zikr of the Khwajagan is called 'Khatm Khajagan'.

Interest in the Khwajagan was revived in the 20th century with the publication in Turkey of Hacegan Hanedanı, by Hasan Lütfi Şuşud (pronounced Shushud), Istanbul, 1958. His sources included:

- Reşahat Ayn el-Hayat, compiled by Mevlana Ali Bin Huseyin Safi, A.H. 993.
- Nefahat el-Uns min Hazerat el-Kuds, by Nuraddin Abdurrahman Jami, A.H. 881.
- Risale-i Bahaiyye, by Rif'at Bey.
- Semerat el-Fuad, by Sari Abdullah.
- Enis ut-Talibin wa Iddet us-Salikin Makamat-i Muhammed Bahaeddin Nakshibend, by Salahaddin Ibn'i Mubarek al-Buhari, Istanbul, A.H. 1328.

A short translation of Shushud's work by J. G. Bennett was published in Systematics – study of multi-term systems Volume 6, No. 4 March 1969, Muhtar Holland's full length translation Masters of Wisdom of Central Asia was published by Coombe Springs press in 1983. J. G. Bennett also wrote a full-length work loosely based on Shushud's original.

Some authors such as Idries Shah and John Godolphin Bennett maintain that George Ivanovich Gurdjieff's 'Fourth Way' originated with the Khwajagan.

== Prominent Khwajagan ==
Prominent Central Asian Khwajagan included:

- Khwaja Ubaidullah Ahrar
- Yusuf Hamdani
- Khwaja Ahmad Yasavi
- Abdul Khaliq Gujduvani
- Baha-ud-Din Naqshband Bukhari
- Maulana Nur ad-Din Abd ar-Rahman Jami
- Nur Chashme Khwajagan Sayyid Mir Jan

== See also ==
- Malamati
- Sarmoung Brotherhood
- Shamballa

== Bibliography ==
- Beads of Dew from the Source of Life by Mawlana Ali ibn Husain Safi, ISBN 1-882216-21-0
- The Way of the Sufi by Idries Shah, ISBN 0-900860-80-4
- Gurdjieff: A Very Great Enigma by J.G. Bennett, ISBN 0-87728-216-1
- Masters Of Wisdom: An Esoteric History of the Spiritual Unfolding of Life on This Planet by J.G. Bennett, ISBN 0-87728-466-0
- Masters Of Wisdom of Central Asia by Hasan Shusud, ISBN 0-900306-93-9
- The Teachers of Gurdjieff by Rafael Lefort, ISBN 0-87728-213-7
- The Naqshbandi Sufi Way, History and Guidebook of the Saints of the Golden Chain by Shaykh Muhammad Hisham Kabbani, Kazi Publications, USA (1995), ISBN 0-934905-34-7
