= The Teachers of Gurdjieff =

- First edition
- Author: Rafael Lefort
- Language: English
- Publisher: Victor Gollancz, Malor Books
- Publication date: 1966, 1998
- Publication place: United Kingdom
- Media type: Print (Hardback & Paperback)
- Pages: 159
- ISBN: 1-883536-16-2 (2nd ed. paperback)
- OCLC: 39633686
- Dewey Decimal: 197 21
- LC Class: BP605.G94 G87 1998

The Teachers of Gurdjieff is a book by Rafael Lefort that describes a journey to the Middle East and central Asia in search of the sources of G. I. Gurdjieff's teaching, and culminates in the author's own spiritual awakening, by meeting and "opening" to the teachings of the Naqshbandi Sufis. The author's search finally leads him to the Sarmoun monastery in Northern Afghanistan where Gurdjieff had been previously taught.

The authors of the Handbook of Islamic Sects and Movements, Muhammad Afzal Upal and Carole M. Cusack consider the book to be a product of the Sufi school associated with Idries Shah and his brother Omar Ali-Shah, and cast doubt on its authenticity. While Upal and Cusack speculate that the "polemic" writing style could be that of Omar Ali-Shah, British historian Mark Sedgwick believes that Rafael Lefort is "almost certainly a pseudonym for Idries Shah." Speaking at the First International Conference on Theosophical History held in London on 18–20 July 1986, Paul Johnson added to the speculation that The Teachers of Gurdjieff was the work of Idries Shah, and that it "seems to have been written to attract Gurdjieff's followers to contemporary Sufism." The Gurdjieff biographer James Moore describes the book as a "distasteful fabrication".

The book first appeared in 1966 from the British publishing house Victor Gollancz. A second edition was published in 1998 by Malor Books under the editorial directorship of Robert Ornstein, a prominent American associate of Idries Shah. A Spanish version has been published by Alif Publishing Corp., which publishes many of Omar Ali-Shah's works, and a Portuguese one by Edições Dervish. A French version ("Les maîtres de Gurdjieff") has been published by Le Courrier du Livre in 1977.
