= Beelzebub's Tales to His Grandson =

Book by George Gurdjieff

- The Penguin hardback edition
- Author: G. I. Gurdjieff
- Language: Russian and Armenian
- Publisher: Harcourt (1950); E.P. Dutton & Co., Inc. (1964, 1973); Two Rivers Press (1993); Penguin Arkana (1999)
- Publication date: 1950
- Media type: Print (Hardcover & Paperback), Audiobook
- Pages: P. 1248 (Penguin paperback edition) p. 1152 (Tarcher hardcover edition)
- ISBN: 0-14-019473-8 (Penguin paperback edition); ISBN 1-58542-457-9 (Tarcher hardcover edition); ISBN 0-919608-16-7 (Audiobook read by William J. Welch)
- OCLC: 42017479
- Followed by: Meetings with Remarkable Men

Beelzebub's Tales to His Grandson or An Objectively Impartial Criticism of the Life of Man is the first volume of the All and Everything trilogy written by the Greek-Armenian mystic G. I. Gurdjieff. The All and Everything trilogy also includes Meetings with Remarkable Men (first published in 1963) and Life Is Real Only Then, When 'I Am' (first privately printed in 1974).

== Purpose and significance ==
The book was intended to be the main study tool for Gurdjieff's Fourth Way teachings. As Gurdjieff's idea of "work" is central to those teachings, Gurdjieff went to great lengths in order to increase the effort needed to read and understand it. Gurdjieff himself once said, “I bury the bone so deep that the dogs have to scratch for it." The book covers many topics. It is an allegory and myth in a literary form all its own.

In his prospectus for All and Everything, printed at the beginning of each part of the trilogy, Gurdjieff states his aim in the first volume of "destroy[ing], mercilessly, without any compromises whatsoever, in the mentation and feelings of the reader, the beliefs and views, by centuries rooted in him, about everything existing in the world."

Beelzebub's Tales is included in Martin Seymour-Smith's 100 Most Influential Books Ever Written, with the comment that it is "...the most convincing fusion of Eastern and Western thought [that] has yet been seen."

== Background ==
=== Author ===
Gurdjieff was most notable for introducing the Fourth Way. He claimed that the Eastern teachings brought by him to the West expressed the truth found in other ancient religions and wisdom teachings relating to self-awareness in one's daily life and humanity's place and role in the universe. It might be summed up by the title of his third series of writings: Life Is Real Only Then, When 'I Am', while his complete series of books is entitled All and Everything.

=== Composition ===
After Gurdjieff was in a serious car accident in 1924, he decided to pass on something of his theoretical teachings by writing a number of detailed books. After many writings and rewritings, the first volume was released under the title Beelzebub's Tales to His Grandson. Gurdjieff first mainly dictated Beelzebub's Tales in Russian and Armenian between 1924 and 1927, as he was initially unable to write personally because of his condition after the accident. After realizing from the various public readings of his texts that those people who were not familiar with his form of mentation and expression would not be able to understand anything, he decided to completely rewrite everything.

Details of Gurdjieff's other activities while writing the book can be found in his third book Life Is Real Only Then, When 'I Am'.

=== Readings ===
Gurdjieff often held various readings of his texts to both his students and strangers. William Buehler Seabrook noted that Gurdjieff asked him to invite some of his friends to Gurdjieff's apartment, where Gurdjieff gave a reading from the manuscript of Beelezbub's Tales. The listeners (including the behaviorist John Watson, Lincoln Steffens, and George Seldes) were apparently perplexed and unimpressed.

== Content ==
Beelzebub's Tales uses the framing device of the musings of an extraterrestrial known as Beelzebub (who shares a name with the demon of the same name) to his grandson Hassein, as they travel through space towards Beelzebub's home planet, Karatas, on the spaceship Karnak. Beelzebub recounts his adventures and travails amongst the "three-brained beings" (humans) of the planet Earth. Beelzebub details the history, customs and psychology of humanity and relates the esoteric theory behind the workings of the universe.

Beelzebub narrates a history of creation that allegorically explains the human condition as perceived by Gurdjieff: Earth is described as being orbited by two satellites which broke off the planet during its early phase after it was hit by a comet: the Moon and a second body (unknown to mankind) called Anulios. In order to maintain cosmic stability it was necessary that both bodies remain in Earth's orbit. To ensure this stability, men were required to emit a certain substance. An artificial organ was implanted into all human beings by the "high powers" making them oblivious of this mechanism but causing psychological side effects such as vanity, pride, and other vices:

And then, in fact, with the help of the Chief-Common-Universal-Arch-Chemist-Physicist Angel Looisos, who was also among the members of this Most High Commission, they caused to grow in the three-brained beings there, in a special way, at the base of their spinal column, at the root of their tail—which they also, at that time, still had, and which part of their common presences furthermore still had its normal exterior expressing the, so to say, ‘fullness-of-its-inner-significance’—a ‘something’ which assisted the arising of the said properties in them. 10.89 “And this ‘something’ they then first called the ‘organ Kundabuffer.’

— G. I. Gurdjieff, Beelzebub's Tales to His Grandson, 10.88-9 and 10.89

That organ was later removed but the side effects remained:

[...] not only during the period when this organ Kundabuffer existed in their presences, but also during the later periods when, although this astonishing organ and its properties had been destroyed in them, nevertheless, owing to many causes, the consequences of its properties had begun to be crystallized in their presences.

— G. I. Gurdjieff, Beelzebub's Tales to His Grandson, 10.89

The protagonist then reports his visits to Earth and the gained insights about humanity. This narration is interrupted by embedded explanations of the author's philosophical world view.

== Publications ==
=== Original English version ===
Beelzebub's Tales to His Grandson was first published in 1950 by Harcourt, Brace & Company and Routledge & Kegan Paul. This first translation was made, under the personal direction of the author, by a group of translators chosen by him and "specially trained according to their defined individualities." It was republished in 1964 by E.P. Dutton & Co, in 1973 by E.P. Dutton & Co (in paperback in three volumes), and in 1993 by Two Rivers Press. It was republished in 1999 by Penguin Arkana in paperback. The 1999 edition contained corrections of errata and the insertion of two paragraphs omitted from page 568 of Chapter 32 "Hypnotism" in earlier editions.

=== Revised translation ===
A revised translation of Beelzebub's Tales to His Grandson was published in 1992 by Arkana, an imprint of Viking Penguin. A number of Gurdjieff's follower objected. The revision was begun on the initiative of Jeanne de Salzmann. The translation team included members of the Gurdjieff Foundation of New York, the Gurdjieff Society (London) and the Institut Gurdjieff (Paris), as well as Triangle Editions, the holder of the copyright to both texts. The latter edition was regarded by some of Gurdjieff's followers, outside of the membership of the International Gurdjieff Foundations, as "a major degeneration that showed disregard of Gurdjieff's work." The introduction to the revised edition states that the 1950 edition, overseen by Orage, who did not know Russian and was unable to read Gurdjieff's original text, produced, "in many passages an awkward result." The introduction states that before Gurdjieff's death in 1949, he entrusted the book and his other writings to Jeanne de Salzmann, his closest pupil, with instructions for future publication. De Salzmann had followed Gurdjieff for more than thirty years and played a central role in his decision in the 1940s to organize the practice of his teaching. As for the first edition, Gurdjieff had called the translation a "rough diamond," and had asked De Salzmann to revise it at a later time.

Opponents of this view, such as John Henderson, claim that Orage had worked closely with Gurdjieff to produce the original English translation.

They point out that the revision resulted in changes to nearly every paragraph, and included substantial changes to both content and presentation. Following are three short representative examples taken from a digital comparison between the 1950 and 1992 versions.

Ordinary text indicates passages that are present in both the original and revised versions. ~~Struck out text~~ indicates passages that were in the original but not in the revision. Underlined text indicates passages that are in the revision but not in the original. Page numbers refer to the 1999 reprint of the 1950 version.

==== Example changes ====
Page 242
~~"So, my boy, when, as~~ "As I have already told you, ~~those three-centered beings there among the second and third generation of the contemporaries of Saint Buddha in whose psyche, already~~ my boy, from the time of the loss of Atlantis~~, that peculiarity had been fixed,~~ the property called the ~~'organic-psychic~~ 'psycho-organic need to wiseacre ~~,' began-unfortunately for~~ ' had become fixed in the psyche of your favorites. (sentence continues in original version)

Page 240:
"Little by little they so completely changed these indications and counsels of His that if should their Saintly Author ~~Himself should chance to appear~~ reappear there and for some reason or other ~~should~~ wish to ~~make Himself acquainted with~~ learn about them, He would ~~not be able~~ never even ~~to~~ suspect that he himself had given these indications and ~~counsels were made by Him Himself.~~ counsels.

Page 750:

- ~~"The-line-of-the-flow-of-forces-constantly-deflecting-according-to-law-and-uniting-again-at-its-ends."~~ (This version contains hyphenation between all the words.)
- "The flow of forces follows a line that constantly deflects at specific intervals and unites again at its ends."

== The intent of the book ==
Gurdjieff said that he had answered every question that could possibly arise in a person's mind and advised readers to read his work once, "for the welfare or the peace of the souls of one's parents", then "for the welfare of one's neighbor" and a third time "for oneself personally".

Although not indicated in the text, it appears that ever since it was written, Beelzebub's Tales to His Grandson was intended not to be intensely studied alone, but to have various pieces of understanding conveyed to the reader through oral tradition to enable a much greater degree of understanding as to what is being written about.

== Characters ==
=== Main characters ===
Beelzebub relates his past experiences in a planetary system called Ors (the Solar System) where he had been banished for rebelling against His Endlessness. He spent his exile in observation of the Solar System, and of Earth and humans in particular. He visited Earth six times and observed it from just after its creation until 1922. Because of his help in the eradication of animal sacrifice on Earth, Beelzebub was pardoned from his sentence.

Beelzebub tells the tales to his grandson Hassein while they are traveling together on the spaceship Karnak for his conference on another planet, shortly after his return from the exile. He took Hassein with him so he could use his free time during this journey for the purpose of giving a proper education to his grandson. Hassein listens to his grandfather's stories patiently, and with admiration. Ahoon is a devoted old servant of Beelzebub who accompanies him and Hassein throughout the space journey.

The name Beelzebub is a derogatory Hebrew renaming of the pre-Judaic Canaanite god Baal, meaning literally "Lord House-fly" (Baal-zevuv) (monotheistic Jewish reference to Baal was almost certainly pejorative, and grew to be used among other terms for Satan. The name later appears as the name of a demon or devil, often interchanged with Beelzebul), while the name Hassein has the same linguistic root with Husayn (Arabic: حسین). Sigmund Freud theorized Judaism and Christianity as expressing a relationship between father (Judaism) and son (Christianity). In this light, Gurdjieff's choice of grandfather and grandson suggests a pre-Judaic and post-Christian relationship.

The spaceship Karnak derives its name from a famous temple in Egypt, located on the banks of the River Nile. When humans are liberated enough to ascend through the ancient knowledge, they could travel through the universe, hence the temple's name for the spaceship.

=== Other major characters ===
- Mullah Nassr Eddin is an impartial teacher with a wise (or "wise") saying for every life situation.
- Lentrohamsanin is a being who destroyed all of the traces of the holy labors and teachings of Ashiata Shiemash.
- Gornahoor Harharkh is a scientist living on the planet Saturn who specializes in elucidating the particularities of Okidanokh, as well as being Beelzebub's "essence friend".
- Archangel Looisos is the Arch-Chemist-Physician of the universe who invented the special organ Kundabuffer, which was implanted at the base of the human spine to prevent humans from perceiving reality. The original word Kundabuffer was corrupted into "Kundalini." Looisos approached Beelzebub to ask for a solution to the widespread practice of animal sacrifice on Earth, the quantity of which was endangering the formation of an atmosphere on the moon.
- Belcultassi is the founder of the society called Akhaldan which was (and to date, is) unmatched in terms of knowledge on Earth.
- King Konuzion invented "Hell" and "Paradise" as a means of making people stop chewing opium.
- Choon-Kil-Tez and Choon-Tro-Pel are Chinese twin brothers who rediscovered the law of sevenfoldness, and invented an apparatus called the Alla-Attapan.
- Hadji-Astvatz-Troov is a Bokharian Dervish familiar with the laws of vibrations and their effects.

=== Saintly cosmic individuals ===
Ashiata Shiemash, Saint Buddha, Saint Lama, Saint Jesus Christ, Saint Moses, Saint Mohammed, Saint Kirminasha, Saint Krishnatkharna

=== Minor characters and historical figures mentioned ===
Leonardo da Vinci, Pythagoras, Alexander of Macedonia, Menitkel (a "learned being" original to the work), Charles Darwin, Ignatius, Franz Mesmer, Dmitri Mendeleev, various angels, various Archangels

=== Neologoisms ===
In the text, Gurdjieff invented many words and terms, such as Triamazikamno – law of three, Heptaparaparshinokh – law of sevenfoldness, Solioonensius – certain cosmic law, and so on. Whether Gurdjieff invented these words, or applied certain concepts to them is unclear. Many of these words have roots in modern languages, while others have roots in ancient languages. Another possibility is noted in Life Is Real Only Then, When 'I Am', where Gurdjieff wrote that he accidentally learned of the word Solioonensius from a Dervish.

Gurdjieff applied these words to minor concepts, as well as some major ones. One of the major concepts is where Gurdjieff applies the word Hasnamuss to certain types of people. According to Beelzebub's Tales, Hasnamuss is a being who acquires "something" which creates certain harmful factors for himself, as well as for those around him. According to Gurdjieff this applies to "average people" as well as to those who are on "higher levels".

This "something" is formed in beings as a result of the following manifestations:

1. Every kind of depravity, conscious as well as unconscious
2. The feeling of self-satisfaction from leading others astray
3. The irresistible inclination to destroy the existence of other breathing creatures
4. The urge to become free from the necessity of actualizing the being-efforts demanded by nature
5. The attempt by every kind to artificially conceal from others what in their opinion are one's physical defects
6. The calm self-contentment in the use of what is not personally deserved
7. The striving to be not what one is

== Impenetrability of the text ==
Gurdjieff went to great lengths to add layer upon layer of complexity to the, at times, dry, long-winded, or absurd text, As noted, he also added a number of long words and phrases which appear often throughout the text. The definition of those words are often given later on in the text, which functionally necessitates more than one reading of the text. He believed that knowledge which comes without any effort from the student is useless. He believed that true knowledge comes from personal experiences and individual confrontations actualized by one's own intentions.

The first chapter, entitled "The Arousing of Thought" (more of a preface or introduction) was edited or rewritten by Gurdjieff thirty times. Gurdjieff would expound one of the book's most controversial ideas in an early chapter entitled "The Arch-absurd: According to the assertion of Beelzebub, our Sun neither lights or heats".

One of Gurdjieff's chief criticisms of modern society, expressed quite clearly even to the casual reader in this particular volume, is the inexactitude of modern language.

The complexity and the length of this book has limited the readers to those with strong interest in Gurdjieff's ideas. This has significantly limited criticism and discussion of it.
