= Chen Cheng (Ming dynasty) =

Chinese diplomat (1365–1457)

Chen's approximate land route (green, based on the list of destinations in Goodrich & Tay 1976), Zheng He's maritime route (black) and Yishiha's riverine route (blue).

Chen Cheng (simplified Chinese: 陈诚; traditional Chinese: 陳誠; pinyin: Chén Chéng; Wade–Giles: Ch'en Ch'eng; 1365–1457), courtesy name Zilu (子鲁), art name Zhushan (竹山), was a Chinese diplomat of the Ming dynasty, known for his overland journeys into Central Asia. His travels were contemporaneous to the treasure voyages of the admiral Zheng He.

== Life ==
Chen was born in 1365 in Linchuan County, Jiangxi province. He obtained the positions of juren (举人) and jinshi (進士) in 1393 and 1394 respectively after taking the imperial examination.

In 1396, Chen was sent on a diplomatic mission to the western region of Qaidam to establish border defence. In 1397, he was sent by the Hongwu Emperor as an envoy to Vietnam. From 1406 to 1411, he served in the Wenyuange (文渊阁), the imperial library in the Forbidden City, as an editor of the Yongle Encyclopedia.

Buddhist idols and temples in Turfan were described in 1414 by Chen Cheng.

In 1414, 1416 and 1420, Chen Cheng led a Ming mission to the court of the Timurid dynasty at Samarkand.

== Works by Chen Cheng ==
- Travel in the Western Region
- Xi yu fan guo zhi, "A Record of the Barbarian Countries in the Western Region."

== See also ==
- Ghiyāth al-dīn Naqqāsh, the diarist of Shahrukh's embassy to the Yongle Emperor's court (1420–1422)
- Ruy Gonzáles de Clavijo, another diplomat – from Spain – who visited Samarkand a few years before Chen Cheng
- Hanlin Academy § Bureau of Translators
