= Abdul Khaliq Ghijduwani =

Central Asian Sufi leader (died 1179)

Abdul Khaliq Ghijduvani or Ghujdawani (died 1179) was one of a group of Central Asian Sufi teachers known simply as Khwajagan (the Masters) of the Naqshbandi order.

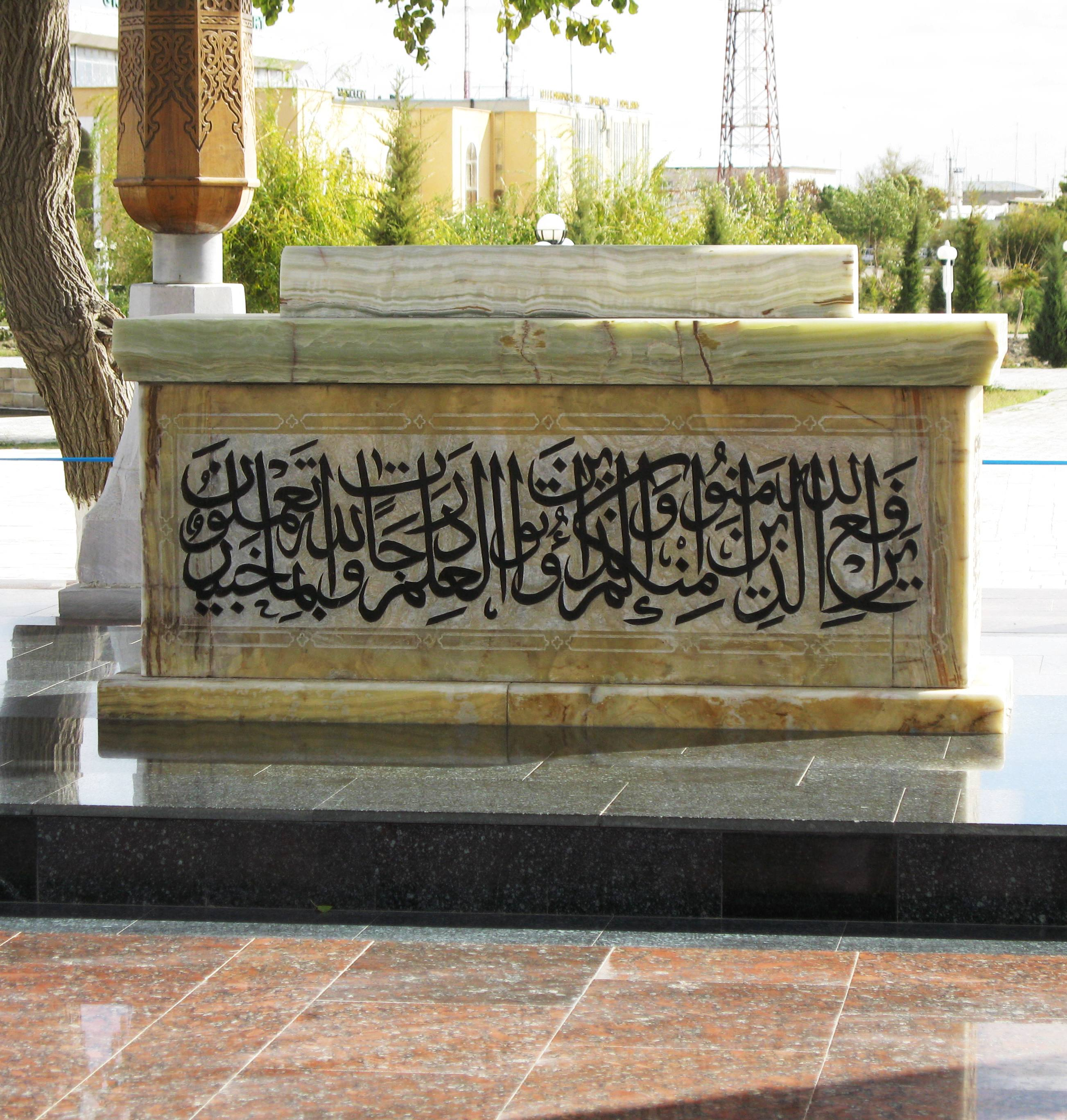
Abdul Khaliq Ghijduwani's tombstone, Uzbekistan

Abdul Khaliq was born in the small town of Ghijduvan, near Bukhara. His father had migrated to Central Asia from Malatya, in eastern Anatolia where he had been a prominent faqih. While Abdul Khaliq was studying tafsir in Bukhara he first had an awakening of interest in the path. He received further training at the hands of Yusuf Hamdani, and was the next link in the Naqshbandi silsila following him.

The way Abdul Khaliq taught became known as the way of the Khojas - teachers.

Abdul Khaliq bequeathed to subsequent generations of the Naqshbandi silsila a series of principles governing their Sufi practice, concisely formulated in Persian and known collectively as "the Sacred Words" (kalimat-i qudsiya), or the "Rules" or "Secrets" of the Naqshbandi Order.

== His friendship with Khidr ==
According to legend, Hoja Abdul Khaliq waited for Allah to bring him to the one who could show him the right path to spiritual perfection. And soon he met with Khidr. Khidr was his father's mentor as well. Khidr, taking Abdul Khaliq as his spiritual son, taught him "vukuf adedi" (the need to keep score of dhikr) and "hidden dhikr". This kind of dhikr, which the Messenger of Allah first taught to Abu Bakr in the cave of Sevr (Thawr), has regained its importance with Abdul Khaliq Ghujdawani's introduction to it. After the death of Hoja Abdul Khaliq, this type of dhikr was again neglected by the followers of the Khwajagan tariqa, but Shah Naqshband, who became a uveysi (absentee) murid of Abdul Khaliq, finally revived the hidden dhikr.

It is also said that besides the hidden dhikr, Khidr taught Ghijduvani the Tawhid dhikr - "nafi and isbat" (negation and affirmation).

The real Murshid of Ghujdawani was Yusuf Hamadani. However, his acquaintance with him was also due to Khidr. Hoja Abdul Khaliq, who found his mentor at the age of twenty, adopted his knowledge in a short time. Abdul Khaliq traveled to a number of Muslim countries and lived for some time in Syria. Even during his lifetime, the good fame of him spread to all parts of the Islamic caliphate. Thousands of people came to see and hear him.

== See also ==
- Eleven Naqshbandi principles
- Mir Sayyid Ali Hamadani

== Bibliography ==
- Hisham Muhammad Kabbani (2003). Classical Islam and the Naqshbandi Sufi Tradition. Institute for Spiritual and Cultural Advancement. ISBN 978-1-930409-10-1.
- Omar Ali Shah (1998). The Rules or Secrets of the Naqshbandi Order. Tractus Books. ISBN 2-909347-09-5.
- John G. Bennett (1995). The Masters of Wisdom. Bennett Books. ISBN 1-881408-01-9.
