= Edward Campbell (journalist) =

British journalist

Edward Cranston Campbell (29 April 1916, Glasgow – 4 April 2006, Tunbridge Wells) was a British journalist, and an acknowledged authority on circuses and the training of wild animals.

== Career ==
Campbell began his journalistic career in the late 1930s with Kemsley Newspapers in Glasgow. He moved to Fleet Street in 1956, where he worked for the Evening Standard, the Evening News and the Sunday Dispatch.

== Books ==
Campbell also authored books, among them Jungle Be Gentle, the ghost-written "autobiography" of his friend, the German animal trainer Hans Brick, and The People of the Secret, published by Idries Shah's Octagon Press, under the pseudonym "Ernest Scott".
