= The miller, his son and the donkey =

Fable

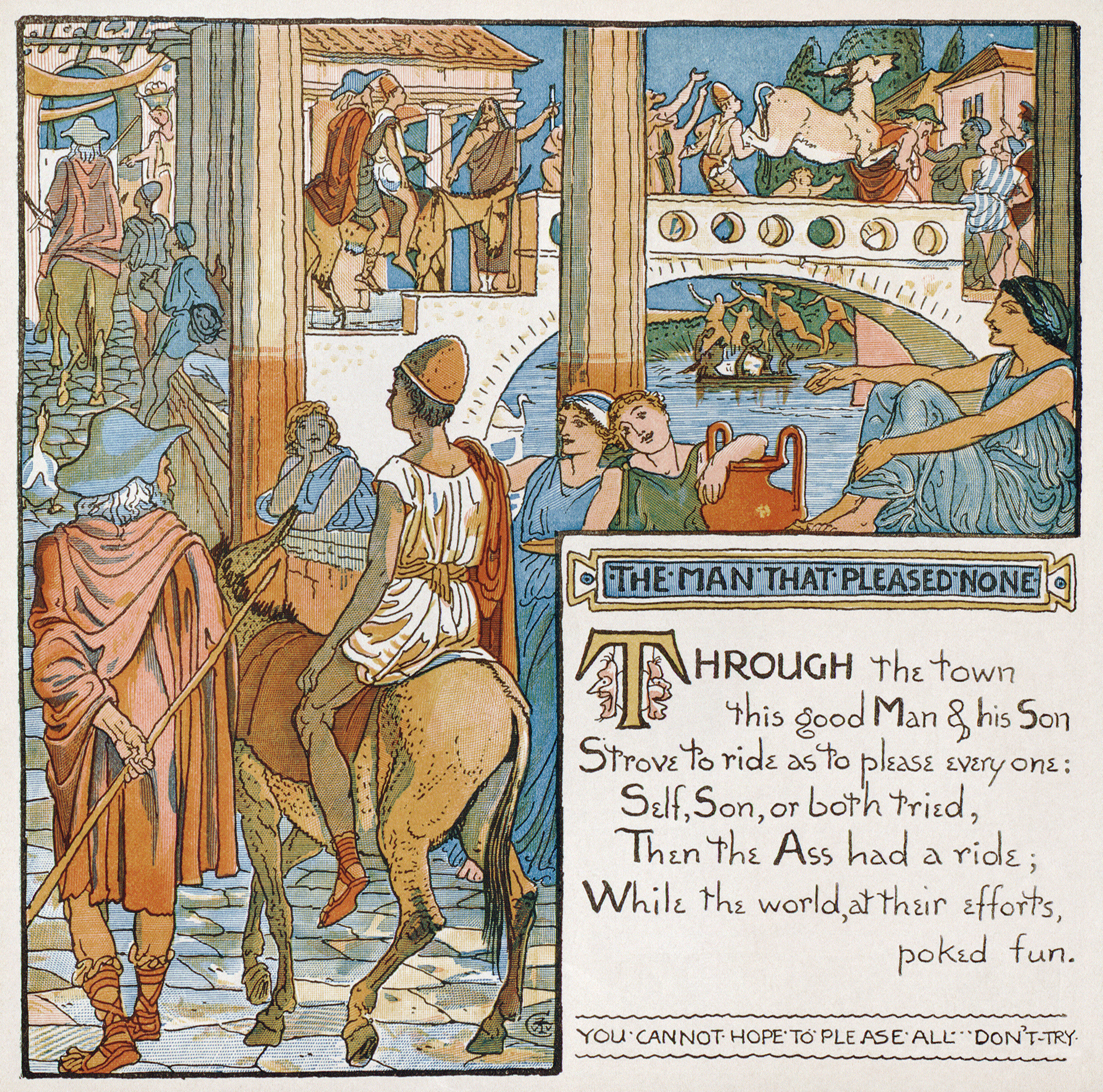
Walter Crane's composite illustration of all the events in the tale for the limerick retelling of the fables, Baby's Own Aesop

The Miller, his Son and the Donkey is a widely dispersed fable, number 721 in the Perry Index and number 1215 in the Aarne–Thompson classification systems of folklore narratives. Though it may have ancient analogues, the earliest extant version is in the work of the 13th-century Arab writer Ibn Said. There are many eastern versions of the tale and in Europe it was included in a number of Mediaeval collections. Since then it has been frequently included in collections of Aesop's fables as well as the influential Fables of Jean de la Fontaine.

== The fable ==
In this fable, a man and his son are accompanied by their donkey and meet constant criticism from passers-by of the way it is used or treated by them. The story's purpose is to show that everyone has their own opinion and there is no way one can satisfy all. There are four or five different elements to the story that are ordered differently according to version. When both walk beside the donkey they are criticised for not riding it. When the father rides, he is blamed for making his young son walk; when the son rides, he is blamed for leaving his elderly father on foot. When both ride, they are berated for overburdening their beast. In later versions the father then exclaims that the only option left is to carry the donkey on his back; in others he does so, or father and son tie the donkey to a pole which they carry on their shoulders. This action causes general mirth and has an unhappy outcome, resulting in the donkey's death through one cause or another.

== History ==
Although there is no ancient source for the tale, there may be some link with a dialogue in Aristophanes' The Frogs, produced in 405 BC. Dionysos is talking to his slave Xanthias, who is riding on a donkey but also carrying a burden himself. Xanthias says the donkey is no help with that weight on his shoulders. "All right, then," answers Dionysos, "Since you claim the donkey's useless to you, why not take your turn and carry it?"

=== Arab world ===
The oldest documented occurrence of the actual story is in the work of the historian, geographer and poet Ibn Said, born and educated in Al-Andalus.

There are many versions of the tale in the East. It occurs in the Forty Vezirs translated from Arabic into Turkish by Sheykh Zada in the early 17th century, summarised as:

An old gardener, having mounted his son upon an ass, is going to his garden, when he is met by certain persons who jeer at him; he then makes the boy get down and mounts himself, when certain others jeer at him; next he makes the boy get up before, and then behind him, always with the same result; at length both go on foot, and thus reach the garden.

The story occurs in the Mulla Nasreddin corpus, where it is the Mulla and his son who are subject to the advice and comments of passers-by. After the experience is over, the Mulla advises his son:

"If you ever should come into the possession of a donkey, never trim its tail in the presence of other people. Some will say that you have cut off too much, and others that you have cut off too little. If you want to please everyone, in the end your donkey will have no tail at all."

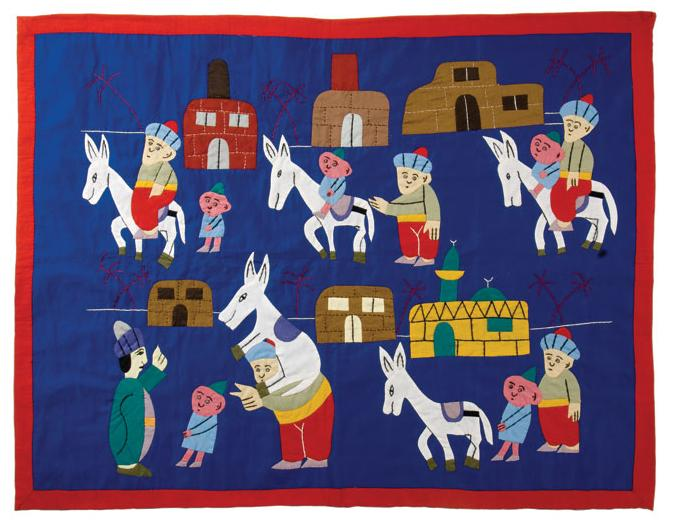
A Goha story cloth by Ahmed Yossery (2007), The Children's Museum of Indianapolis

Many Nasreddin tales are also told of Goha in the Arab world, and sure enough, Goha features in a similar story, popular as a subject for the patchwork story cloths of the tentmakers of the Street of Tentmakers (Sharia al Khiyamiya) in Cairo. The story is framed as a deliberate lesson on the part of the father. As Sarah Gauch comments in The adventures of Goha, the Wise Fool, a book illustrated with the tentmakers' creations, "every tentmaker has a Goha... but whatever the Goha, it seems the favourite story is the tale 'Goha Gives His Son a Lesson About Life'."

=== European ===
In Mediaeval Europe it is found from the 13th century on in collections of parables created for inclusion in sermons, of which Jacques de Vitry's Tabula exemplorum is the earliest. Among collections of fables in European tongues, it makes its earliest appearance in the Castilian of Don Juan Manuel. Titled "What happened to a good Man and his Son, leading a beast to market" (story 23), it is included in his Tales of Count Lucanor (1335). Here it is the son who is so infirm of will that he is guided by the criticisms of others along the road until the father expostulates with him that they have run out of alternatives. The moral given is:

In thy chosen life's adventures, stedfastly pursue the cause,
Neither moved by critic's censure, nor the multitude's applause.

In this version the episode of the two carrying the ass is absent, but it appears in Poggio Bracciolini's Facetiae (1450), where the story is related as one that a papal secretary has heard and seen depicted in Germany. The miller and his son are on the way to sell the ass at market but finally the father is so frustrated by the constant criticism that he throws the ass into the river. The same story is told among the "100 Fables" (Fabulae Centum) of Gabriele Faerno (1564) and as the opening poem in Giovanni Maria Verdizotti's Cento favole morali (1570). It also appeared in English in Merry Tales and Quick Answers or Shakespeare's Jest Book (c. 1530) with the same ending of the old man throwing the ass into the water.

A slightly later version by the German meistersinger Hans Sachs was created as a broadsheet in 1531. In his retelling a man is asked by his son why they are living secluded in the woods and replies that it is because there is no pleasing anyone in the world. When the son wishes to test this, they set off with their ass and meet criticism whatever they do. Finally they beat the ass to death, are criticised for that too and retreat back into the forest. In drawing the lesson that one should stick to one's decisions despite what the world says, Sachs refers to the story as an 'old fable', although it is obviously not the one with which Poggio's fellow secretary was acquainted. The Latin version created in Germany by Joachim Camerarius under the title Asinus Vulgi ("The public ass") follows the standard story with the single variation that father and son throw the ass over a bridge when they reach it. It is this version too that the Dane Niels Heldvad (1563–1634) used for his translation of the fable.

When Jean de La Fontaine included the tale in his work (Fables III.1, 1668), he related that it had been told by the poet François de Malherbe to his indecisive disciple Honorat de Bueil, seigneur de Racan. The order of the episodes are radically altered, however, and the story begins with the father and son carrying the ass between them so that it will arrive fresh for sale at market. The laughter of bystanders causes him to set it free and subsequent remarks have them changing places until the miller loses patience and decides he will only suit himself in future, for "Doubt not but tongues will have their talk" whatever the circumstances. Earlier on he had reflected that 'He's mad who hopes to please the whole world and his brother'. Robert Dodsley draws the same conclusion in his version of 1764: 'there cannot be a more fruitless attempt than to endeavour to please all mankind', a sentiment shortened by later authors to 'there's no pleasing everyone'. Anne Finch, Countess of Winchilsea had also made a close translation of the poem, published in 1713, and John Byrom included a retelling in his Miscellaneous Poems (1773) under the title "The Country Fellows and the Ass".

== The applied and decorative arts ==
The fable has been illustrated in a number of connections, including on a 1960 Hungarian postage stamp. In around 1800, a composite version of the episodes in the tale appeared as a design for printed cotton fabric in France and in 1817 Hippolyte Lecomte designed a lithograph of the fable suitable to be displayed in people's homes. Later in the 19th century it was the subject of cards issued by the Liebig meat extract company and Guérin Boutron chocolates. An educational postcard was also issued with the text on the back. Elsewhere, the American Encaustic Tiling Company of Zanesville, Ohio, produced in 1890 a series of printed decal tiles taken directly from the original plates of Walter Crane's Baby's Own Aesop. The fable was one of these and featured a composite design of its episodes.

At the start of the 18th century, French artist Claude Gillot produced a coloured drawing of father and son riding side by side on the donkey. In 1835 it is recorded that the French Baron Bastien Felix Feuillet de Conches, a collector and great enthusiast of La Fontaine's fables, got a colleague to commission a miniature of this and other fables from the Punjabi court painter Imam Bakhsh Lahori. The composite design shows the group positioned sideways along a street of handsome Indian buildings. It is now on exhibition at the Musée Jean de La Fontaine at Château-Thierry, as well as Hortense Haudebourt-Lescot's oil painting of the father riding through the town with the son holding onto the bridle. Other minor artists who painted the subject were Jules Salles-Wagner (1814–1900), Jules-Joseph Meynier (1826–1903) and Émile Louis Foubert (1848–1911).

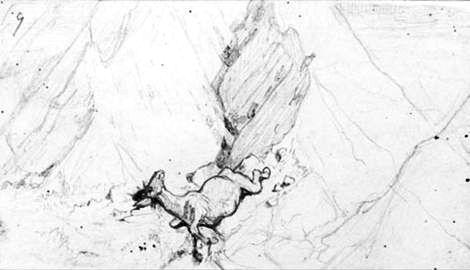
The donkey's fate, a study by Elihu Vedder

Some artists painted more than one version of episodes from the fable. One was Honoré Daumier, whose painting of 1849/50 is now in the Kelvingrove Art Gallery and Museum. This shows a group of three women turning back to mock the miller and son as they cross the end of the street; but another version has them watched by a woman and her children as they take the road round the edge of the town. Another such artist was the American Symbolist painter Elihu Vedder, whose nine scenes from the story (dating from 1867/8) are in the Metropolitan Museum of Art and follow the donkey's course through an Italian hill town until it topples over a bridge into a ravine. European Symbolist painters who treated the subject include the French Gustave Moreau, who made it part of a set of watercolours dedicated to La Fontaine's fables, and the Swiss Ferdinand Hodler (1853–1918). In the 20th century there has been an etching by Marc Chagall and a coloured woodcut by André Planson (1898–1981).
