= Nasreddin =

Muslim world folklore character

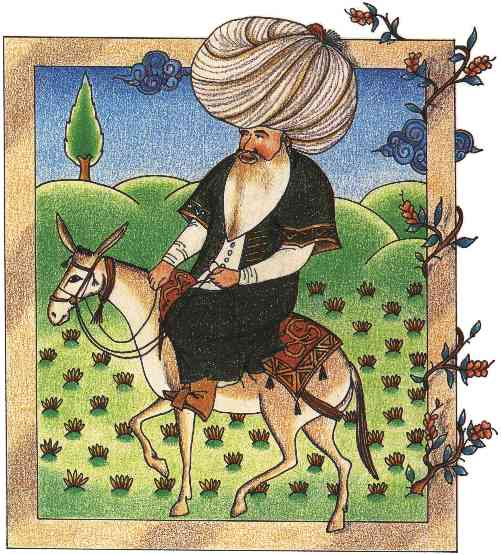
A 17th-century miniature of Nasruddin, from the collection of the Topkapı Palace Museum

Nasreddin (/næsˈrɛdɪn/) or Nasreddin Hodja is a character commonly found in the folklores of Central Asia and a hero of humorous short stories and satirical anecdotes. His adventures are celebrated in dozens of languages, starting with Turkish, and others such as Serbo-Croatian, Macedonian, Albanian, Persian, Arabic, Greek, Corsican, and Russian. There have been frequent claims about his historical existence, with some pointing to purported physical or archaeological evidence such as a commemorative tombstone in the city of Akşehir, Turkey. The specific date or place of Nasreddin's birth, and his historicity, remain an open question.

Nasreddin appears in thousands of stories, sometimes witty, sometimes wise, but in many of which he is presented as a (holy) fool or as the butt of a joke. A Nasreddin story usually has a subtle humour and a pedagogic nature. The International Nasreddin Hodja festival is celebrated between 5 and 10 July every year in Akşehir.

In 2022, "The tradition of telling comic tales about Nasreddin Khoja" was added in the UNESCO Intangible Cultural Heritage list after it was jointly submitted in 2020 by the governments of Azerbaijan, Kazakhstan, Kyrgyzstan, Uzbekistan, Tajikistan, Turkey and Turkmenistan.

== Origin and legacy ==
There are many claims about his origin. The first anecdotes about Nasreddin Hoca in Turkish-language sources are found in the سالتوق نامه Saltuḳ-nāme by Ebülhayri Rumi (d. 1480) and inلطائف Letāʾif by Lamiî Çelebi (d. 1531). Lamiî Çelebi identifies Nasreddin Hoca as a contemporary of Şeyyad Hamza (14th century). The Mufti of Sivrihisar, Hüseyin Effendi (d. 1880) writes in Mecmua-Maarif that the Hodja was born in the village of Hortu, Sivrihisar in 1208 and died in 1284 in Akşehir, the town he had immigrated to. Some authors claim he was a contemporary of Timurleng.

Many other sources as well give the birthplace of Nasreddin as Hortu Village in Sivrihisar, Eskişehir Province, present-day Turkey, in the 13th century, after which he settled in Akşehir, and later in Konya under the Seljuk Sultanate of Rum, where he died in 1275/6 or 1285/6 CE. It is claimed that the tomb of Nasreddin is in Akşehir, and the International Nasreddin Hodja Festival is held annually in Akşehir, 5–10 July.

There are also opposing views to the effect that Nasreddin's origin lies in Central Asia. For instance, the Russian writer Leonidas Soloviof has claimed Hodja to be of Bukharan origin.

There is even a claim that he is a figure of fiction altogether, and that he is a Turkish conversion into Hodja (Khodja) from the famous Arabian joke-teller Juha (Djoha/Djuha). Juha is mentioned in al-Jahiz's book "Concerning mules" (القول في البغال). According to al-Dhahabi's book "The balance of moderation (advisable) in the criticism of men" (ميزان الاعتدال في نقد الرجال), his full name was Abu al-Ghusn Dujayn al-Fizari, he lived under the Umayyad Caliphate in Kufa, and his mother was said to be a servant to Anas ibn Malik. He was one of the tabi'un in Sunni tradition.

[A]nd of them (juha), and he is nicknamed aba ghusn, and what has been told of him suggests astuteness and intelligence, although he be overwhelmingly made to appear foolish, and it has been said that some who would malign him fabricate deliberately tales intended to discredit him.

— Ibn al-Jawzi

The oldest manuscript of Nasreddin dates to 1571. Some of the stories, however, are in the Philogelos and Aesop's fables.

Today, Nasreddin stories are told in many countries - especially those of the Muslim world - and have been translated into many languages. Certain regions independently developed a 'wise fool' character similar to Nasreddin, and the stories have become part of a larger whole. In many regions, Nasreddin is a major part of the culture and is quoted or alluded to frequently in daily life. Since there are thousands of different Nasreddin stories, one can be found to fit almost any occasion. Nasreddin often appears as a whimsical character in an extensive folk tradition of vignettes in Persianate culture.

Some people say that, whilst uttering what seemed madness, he was, in reality, divinely inspired, and that it was not madness but wisdom that he uttered.

— The Turkish Jester or The Pleasantries of Cogia Nasr Eddin Effendi

Azerbaijani scholars Mammadhuseyn Tahmasib and Mammadagha Sultanov claimed that the folklore hero Molla Nasraddin was the minister of the Ilkhanate period, Nasir al-Din al-Tusi. The reasons for this are that they lived in the same period, Tusi included anecdotes in one of his works, ridiculed astrologers as a scientist, Molla Nasraddin went to Emir Timur as a representative of the country, the parallel between Nasir al-Din al-Tusi being sent to Hulagu Khan by the ruler of Alamut and both having the same name—Hasan. However, Mammadhuseyn Tahmasib stated that this information is not conclusive evidence.

== Name ==
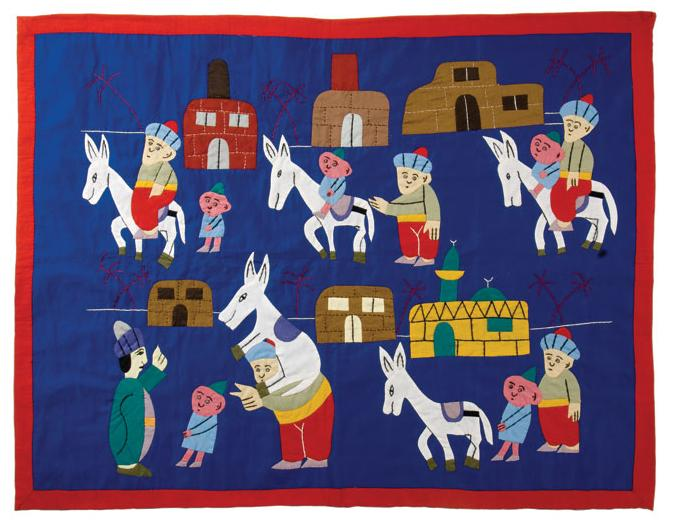
A Goha story cloth by Ahmed Yossery (2007) depicting a version of The miller, his son and the donkey, The Children's Museum of Indianapolis

Many peoples of the Near, Middle East, South Asia and Central Asia claim Nasreddin as their own (e.g., Turks, Afghans, Iranians, and Uzbeks). His name is spelt in a wide variety of ways: Nastradin, Nasrudeen, Nasrudin, Nasruddin, Nasriddin, Nasr ud-Din, Nasredin, Nasiruddin, Naseeruddin, Nasr Eddin, Nastradhin, Nasreddine, Nastratin, Nusrettin, Nasrettin, Nostradin, Nastradin (lit.: Victory of the Deen) and Nazaruddin. It is sometimes preceded or followed by a title or honorific used in the corresponding cultures: "Hoxha", "Khwaje", "Koja", "Hodja", "Hoja", "Hojja", "Hodscha", "Hodža", "Hoca", "Hocca","Hooka", "Hogea", "Mullah", "Mulla", "Mula", "Molla", "Efendi", "Afandi", "Ependi" (أفندي 'afandī), "Hajji". In several cultures he is named by the title alone.

In Arabic-speaking countries this character is known as "Juha", "Jiha", "Djoha", "Djuha", "Dschuha", "Chotzas", "Goha" (جحا juḥā). Juha was originally a separate folk character found in Arabic literature as early as the 9th century, and was widely popular by the 11th century. Lore of the two characters became amalgamated in the 19th century when collections were translated from Arabic into Turkish and Persian.

In Sicily and Southern Italy he is known as "Giufà", derived from the Arabic character Juha. In Maltese, his name is 'Ġaħan'.

In the Swahili and Indonesian culture, many of his stories are being told under the name of "Abunuwasi" or "Abunawas", though this confuses Nasreddin with an entirely different man – the poet Abu Nuwas, known for homoerotic verse.

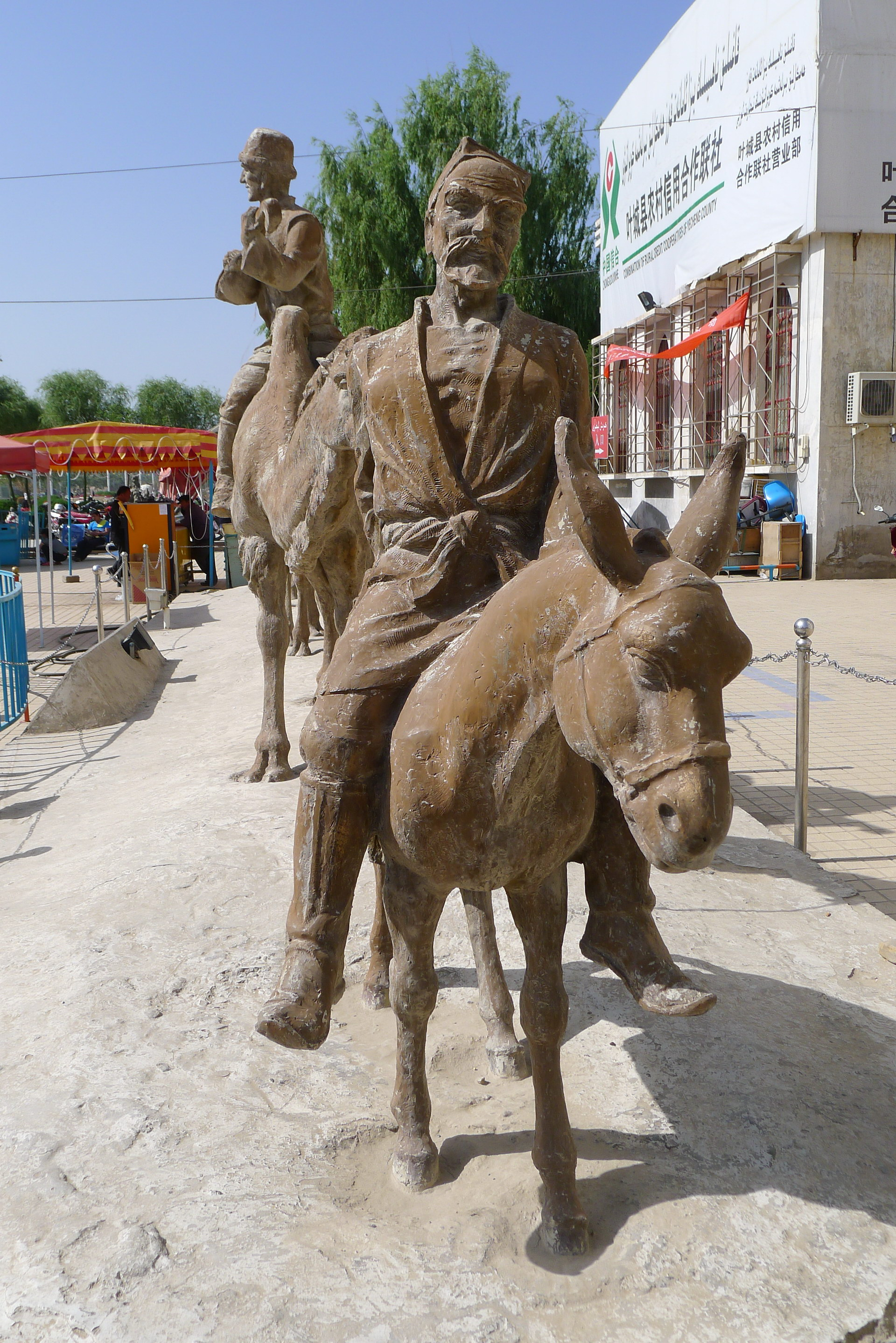
Statue of Afanti in Xinjiang, China

In China, where stories of him are well known, he is known by the various transliterations from his Uyghur name, 阿凡提 (Āfántí) and 阿方提 (Āfāngtí). The Uyghurs believe that he was from Xinjiang, while the Uzbeks believe he was from Bukhara. Shanghai Animation Film Studio produced a 13-episode Nasreddin related animation The Story of Afanti in 1979, which became one of the most influential animations in China's history. The musical Nasirdin Apandim features the legend of Nasreddin effendi ("sir, lord"), largely sourced from Uyghur folklore.

In Central Asia, he is commonly known as "Afandi" or "Afanti". The Central Asian peoples also claim his local origin, as do Uyghurs.

Afandi or Afanti originates from Turkish "Efendi" (Effendi) and this is a title still used to show respect in Turkey. The combination "Hoja Efendi" is used in Turkey very often for the Muslim scholars in modern times as well. The word "Efendi" is ultimately derived from Greek "Authentes" (αὐθέντης) into Turkish. "Nasreddin Hoja Efendi" was shortened as "Efendi" in time. Subsequently "Efendi" happened to be the proper name as "Affandi" in Central Asia for Nasreddin Hoja.

== Tales ==
The Nasreddin stories are known throughout the Middle East and have touched cultures around the world. Superficially, most of the Nasreddin stories may be told as jokes or humorous anecdotes. They are told in the teahouses and caravanserais of Asia and in homes and on the radio. But it is inherent in a Nasreddin story that it may be understood at many levels. There is the joke, followed by a moral and usually the little extra which brings the consciousness of the potential mystic a little further on the way to realization.

=== Examples ===
==== The Sermon ====
Once Nasreddin was invited to deliver a sermon. When he had gone up into the pulpit, he asked, Do you know what I am going to say? The audience replied "no", so he announced, I have no desire to speak to people who don't even know what I will be talking about! and left.
The people felt embarrassed and called him back again the next day. This time, when he asked the same question, the people replied yes. So Nasreddin said, Well, since you already know what I am going to say, I won't waste any more of your time! and left.
Now the people were really perplexed. They decided to try one more time and once again invited the Mullah to speak the following week. Once again he asked the same question – Do you know what I am going to say? Now the people were prepared and so half of them answered "yes" while the other half replied "no". So Nasreddin said Let the half who know what I am going to say tell it to the half who don't, and left.

==== Whom do you believe? ====
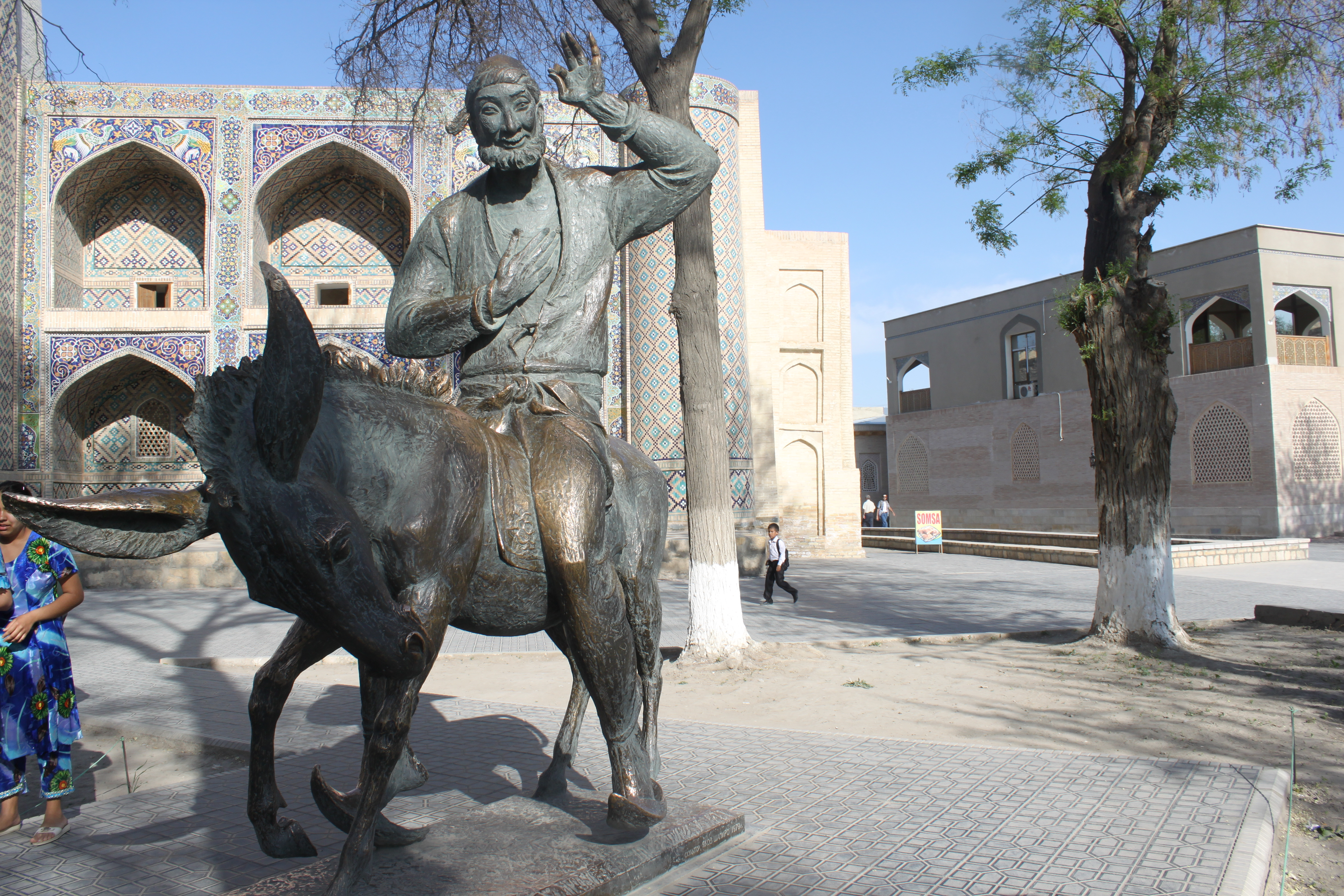
Nasreddin Hodja in Bukhara

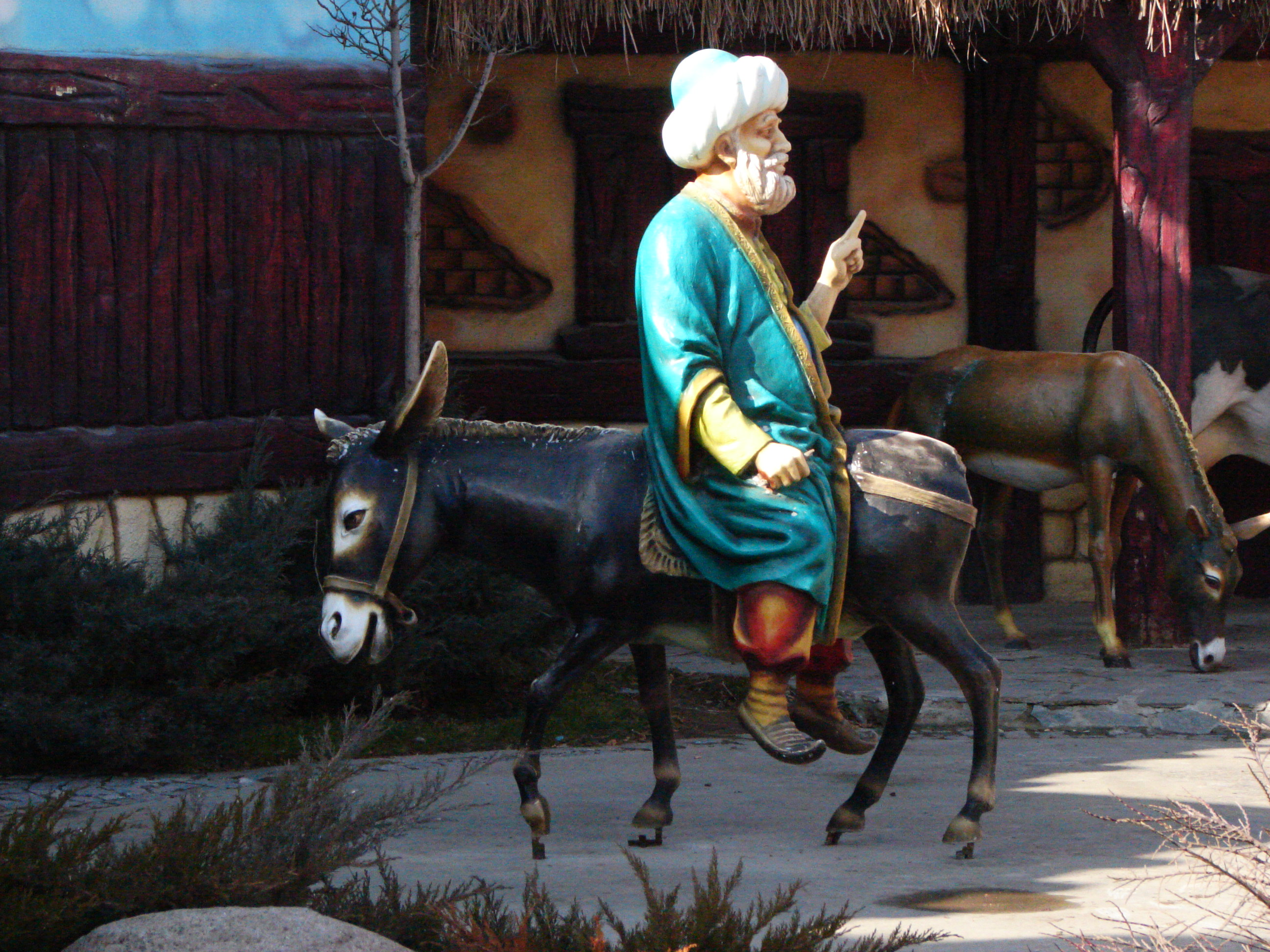
Nasreddin Hodja in Ankara

A neighbour came to the gate of Hodja Nasreddin's yard. The Hodja went to meet him outside.
"Would you mind, Hodja," the neighbour asked, "can you lend me your donkey today? I have some goods to transport to the next town."
The Hodja didn't feel inclined to lend out the animal to that particular man, but, not wishing to appear rude by simply saying "no", he answered:
"I'm sorry, but I've already lent him to somebody else."
All of a sudden the donkey let out a loud bray from behind the wall of the yard.
"But Hodja," the neighbour exclaimed. "I can hear it behind that wall!"
"Whom do you believe," the Hodja replied indignantly, "the donkey or your Hodja?"

==== Taste the same ====
Some children saw Nasreddin coming from the vineyard with two baskets full of grapes loaded on his donkey. They gathered around him and asked him to give them a taste.
Nasreddin picked up a bunch of grapes and gave each child a grape.
"You have so much, but you gave us so little," the children whined.
"There is no difference whether you have a basketful or a small piece. They all taste the same," Nasreddin answered, and continued on his way.

==== Nasreddin's ring ====
Mullah had lost his ring in the living room. He searched for it for a while, but since he could not find it, he went out into the yard and began to look there. His wife, who saw what he was doing, asked: "Mullah, you lost your ring in the room, why are you looking for it in the yard?" Mullah stroked his beard and said: "The room is too dark and I can't see very well. I came out to the courtyard to look for my ring because there is much more light out here".

== In the literature and folk tradition of Central Asia and the Caucasus ==
Uzbeks consider Nasreddin an Uzbek who was born and lived in Bukhara, and stories about him are called latifa or afandi. There are at least two collections of Uzbek stories related to Nasriddin Afandi:

- "Afandining qirq bir passhasi" – (Forty-one flies of Afandi) – Zohir A'lam, Tashkent
- "Afandining besh xotini" – (Five wives of Afandi)

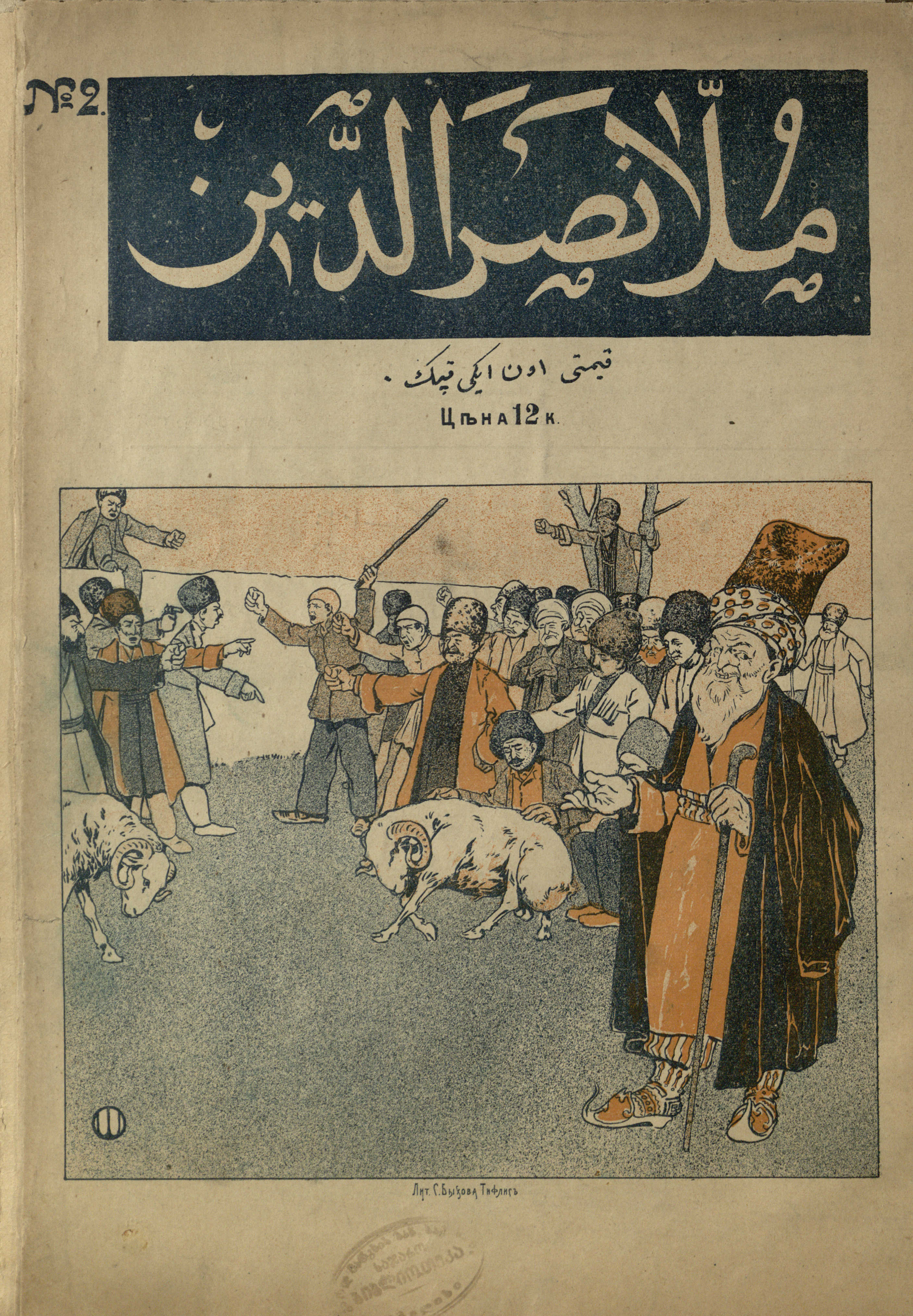
Molla Nasraddin cover (1906, #2)

Nasreddin was the main character in a magazine, called simply Molla Nasraddin, published in Azerbaijan and "read across the Muslim world from Morocco to Iran". The eight-page Azerbaijani satirical periodical was published in Tiflis (from 1906 to 1917), Tabriz (in 1921) and Baku (from 1922 to 1931) in the Azeri and occasionally Russian languages. Founded by Jalil Mammadguluzadeh, it depicted inequality, cultural assimilation, and corruption and ridiculed the backward lifestyles and values of clergy and religious fanatics. The magazine was frequently banned but had a lasting influence on Azerbaijani and Iranian literature.

== In India ==
He is known as Mullah Nasruddin in South Asian children's books. A TV serial on him was aired in India as Mulla Nasiruddin.

== In European and Western folk tradition and literature ==
A XIX collection of Nasreddin anecdotes, by the arabic name of Juha, was published in the French translation of the One Thousand and One Nights by Dr. J. C. Mardrus. The collection didn't usually appear in the Nights' corpus, but a different Juha tale was added in a single One Thousand Nights manuscript in Madrid.

Some Nasreddin tales also appear in collections of Aesop's fables. The miller, his son and the donkey is one example. Others are "The Ass with a Burden of Salt" (Perry Index 180) and "The Satyr and the Traveller".

In Albanian folk tales of Albania and Kosovo the name appears as "Nastradini". Part of Nasreddin tales also refer to the protagonist as just "someone".

In some Bulgarian folk tales that originated during the Ottoman period, the name appears as an antagonist to a local wise man, named Sly Peter.

In Sicily the same tales involve a man named Giufà.

In Sephardic culture, spread throughout the Ottoman Empire, a character that appears in many folk tales is named Djohá.

In Romanian, the existing stories come from an 1853 verse compilation edited by Anton Pann, a philologist and poet renowned for authoring the current Romanian anthem.

Nasreddin is mostly known as a character from short tales; however, he has also been featured in longer media, such as novels and films. In Russia, Nasreddin is known mostly because of the Russian work Возмутитель спокойствия by Leonid Solovyov (English translations: "The Beggar in the Harem: Impudent Adventures in Old Bukhara", 1956, and "The Tale of Hodja Nasreddin: Disturber of the Peace", 2009). The composer Shostakovich celebrated Nasreddin, among other figures, in the second movement (Yumor, "Humor") of his Symphony No. 13. The text, by Yevgeny Yevtushenko, portrays humor as a weapon against dictatorship and tyranny. Shostakovich's music shares many of the "foolish yet profound" qualities of Nasreddin's sayings listed above.

The Graeco-Armenian mystic G. I. Gurdjieff often referred to "our own dear Mullah Nasr Eddin", also calling him an "incomparable teacher", particularly in his book Beelzebub's Tales. Sufi philosopher Idries Shah published several collections of Nasruddin stories in English, and emphasized their teaching value.

== Film ==
In 1943, the Soviet film Nasreddin in Bukhara was directed by Yakov Protazanov based on Solovyov's book, followed in 1947 by a film called The Adventures of Nasreddin, directed by Nabi Ganiyev and also set in the Uzbekistan SSR.

In 1964, Richard Williams, a Canadian-British animator, began work on Nasrudin, an animated film based on the character. The film was produced with the help of Idries Shah, for whom Williams had illustrated books about the character; however, tensions between Williams's crew and the Shah family brought an end to Williams's relationship with them, and ended his right to use Nasreddin as a character. The unfinished film was later reworked into The Thief and the Cobbler, which had a similarly troubled production history.

== Collections ==
- Bacha, Mohamed30 Funny Stories of Joha, The Beloved Folk Hero of The East (bilingual English - Arabic)
- George Borrow, trans. [1884]. The Turkish Jester or, The Pleasantries of Cogia Nasr Eddin Effendi (in English) at Project Gutenberg
- 600 Mulla Nasreddin Tales, collected by Mohammad Ramazani (Popular Persian Text Series: 1) (in Persian).
- Tales of the Hodja, retold by Charles Downing, illustrated by William Papas. Oxford University Press: London, 1964.
- The Exploits of the Incomparable Mulla Nasrudin, by Idries Shah, illustrated by Richard Williams
- The Subtleties of the Inimitable Mulla Nasrudin, by Idries Shah, illustrated by Richard Williams.
- The Pleasantries of the Incredible Mulla Nasrudin, by Idries Shah, illustrated by Richard Williams and Errol Le Cain
- The World of Nasrudin by Idries Shah
- Travels with Nasrudin, The Misadventures of the Mystifying Nasrudin, The Peregrinations of the Perplexing Nasrudin, The Voyages and Vicissitudes of Nasrudin, and Nasrudin in the Land of Fools, five volumes by Tahir Shah, Secretum Mundi, London, 2019-2022
- Mullah Nasiruddiner Galpo (Tales of Mullah Nasreddin) collected and retold by Satyajit Ray, (in Bengali)
- The Wisdom of Mulla Nasruddin, by Shahrukh Husain
- Watermelons, Walnuts, and the Wisdom of Allah and Other Tales of the Hoca, by Barbara K. Walker, Illustrated by Harold Berson ISBN 9780896722545
- The Uncommon Sense of the Immortal Mullah Nasruddin: Stories, jests, and donkey tales of the beloved Persian folk hero, collected and retold by Ron Suresha.
- Kuang Jinbi (2004). The magic ox and other tales of the Effendi. Fredonia Books. ISBN 978-1-4101-0692-6.
- The Wise Old Man: Turkish Tales of Nasreddin Hodja, told by Lyon Bajar Juda, illustrated by Tessa Theobald. Thomas Nelson and Sons Ltd: Edinburgh, 1963.
- Extraordinary Adventures of Mullah Nasruddin: Naughty, unexpurgated tales of the beloved wise fool from the Middle and Far East, collected and retold by Ron Suresha.
- Melayê Meşhûr (The famous Mulla) by Mehmed Emîn Bozarslan, Uppsala: Deng Publishers, 85 pp., ISBN 91-7382-620-0, 1986 (in Kurdish)
- Once There Was, Twice There Wasn't: Fifty Turkish Folktales of Nasreddin Hodja, adapted by Michael Shelton. Boston: Hey Nonny Nonny Press, 2014
- Twenty-Four Nasreddins (1986), a collective work (in Russian)

== Sources ==
- Boratav, Pertev Naili (2014). Nasreddin Hoca. Istanbul: Islık Yayınları. ISBN 9786056469909.
