= The Story of Afanti =

- Genre: Stop motion; Puppetry
- Written by: Ling Shu; Jin Xi (one-off film); Ling Shu; Qu Jianfang (series)
- Directed by: Jin Xi; Liu Huiyi (one-off film); Qu Jianfang (series)
- Composers: Wu Yingju (one-off film); Jin Fuzai; Zhou Ji
- Country of origin: China
- Original language: Chinese

Production
- Production company: Shanghai Animation Film Studio

Original release
- Release: 1981 – 1988

The Story of Afanti (Uyghur language: نەسىرىدىن ئەپەندى هىكاىيلىرى) is a 13-episode color puppet film series produced by Shanghai Animation Film Studio from 1981 to 1988. The single-episode play "Afanti" produced by Shanghai Animation Film Studio in 1979 is also often considered part of this series. The single-episode play "Afanti" was directed by Jin Xi and Liu Huiyi; the 13-episode "The Story of Afanti" was directed by Qu Jianfang. The voice actors for Afanti were Bi Ke and Cheng Zhi.

"The Story of Afanti" is based on the widely circulated stories of Nasreddin Afanti in Xinjiang Uyghur Autonomous Region, China. Each episode is approximately 20 to 30 minutes long, with independent plots. The main content revolves around the clever and wise Afanti's battles of wits against local bullies, tyrants, and the king. Afanti is portrayed with exaggerated appearances and actions, humorous and witty, making him unique among the positive protagonists in Chinese film and television at the time. "The Story of Afanti" also incorporates many Xinjiang elements, such as music and costumes.

The Story of Afanti (in its entirety or as a single episode) has won numerous awards, including the Huabiao Awards (Ministry of Culture 1979 Outstanding Film Award) for Animated Film, the 3rd Hundred Flowers Awards for Best Animated Film, the 1989 Chicago International Children's Film Festival First Prize for Animated Short Film, and the First National Minority Theme Film Tenglong Award for Animated Film.

== Nasreddin in literature ==
Nasreddin, as a literary figure, is not only popular in China (Xinjiang), but also widely circulated in Arabic, Turkish, Persian, and Central Asian cultures, with humorous stories about him. In different ethnic groups and languages, he is known as Hoja Nasreddin, Nasreddin Hoja, Nasreddin Nasreddin, Mullah Nasreddin Nasreddin, and so on. "Nasreddin" is his personal name, while "Hoja," "Nasreddin," and "Mula" are respectful titles for wise men.

The image of Afanti varies across different cultures. The earliest depiction comes from the Arab world, with the figure of Juha appearing in the 10th century. However, Juha could be either an object of ridicule or a professional storyteller. Because jokes about Juha often portray him as foolish, Juha is frequently seen as the epitome of stupidity.

Hoja Nasreddin, one of the predecessors of Afanti, was a humorist, scholar, and religious figure born in Turkey in the early 13th century. An 18th-century portrait of Hoja Nasreddin is preserved in the Topkapi Palace in Turkey, and his tomb also exists in Akşehir. In Turkey, Hoja Nasreddin is a respected figure of humor and wit. The stories of Juha, introduced to Turkey around the 13th century, gradually merged with those of Hoja Nasreddin. Although Hoja Nasreddin was considered more intelligent than Juha, there are also stories of him being mocked and satirized.

After the stories of Afanti were introduced to Xinjiang, China, his character changed, gradually evolving into a witty, brave, and upright folk hero—a kind and honest farmer who always found a way to solve problems. The July 1955 issue of *Folk Literature* published "The Story of Sasserdin Afanti," and from then on, the image of the witty and brave Afanti began to circulate in the Chinese-speaking world.

== Historical context ==
In the late 1970s, Chinese film production began to gradually recover from the Cultural Revolution. However, many films and television dramas produced before this recovery had already begun shooting, so traces of class struggle and the "Three Prominences" still remained. The films and television dramas produced at that time still exhibited phenomena such as merely depicting beautiful things, failing to delve into the emotions of the characters, and not completely breaking away from the traditional concept of good versus evil. The puppet animation *The Story of Afanti* also initially displayed these characteristics to some extent.

When *The Story of Afanti* aired, China had not yet imported foreign animated films on a large scale, so it faced little competition. Even the initial introduction of animated films like *Astro Boy* did not significantly impact the market share of Chinese animated films, including *The Story of Afanti*. The release of *The Story of Afanti* coincided with the period when television became widespread in Chinese households. The scarcity of television programs at the time made the few animated films available an indispensable part of the lives of Chinese teenagers. This contributed to *The Story of Afanti* becoming a classic in the memories of many Chinese people born in the 1970s and 80s.

== Filming and production ==
The single-episode animated series *Avanti* was a tribute film produced by the Shanghai Animation Film Studio to celebrate the 30th anniversary of the founding of the People's Republic of China. Before filming, the creative team proposed the concept of "derived from life but transcending it, drawing material from life itself." Therefore, directors Jin Xi and Liu Huiyi, along with art designer Qu Jianfang and other key members, traveled to Kashgar Prefecture, Xinjiang in 1977 for research and data collection. During this time, they encountered different portrayals of Avanti, including those from the Arab world, but ultimately decided to create an animation based on the Avanti image popular among the Uyghur people. In 1979, the Shanghai Animation Film Studio released the puppet animation *Avanti*, which was very popular with audiences. Art designer Qu Jianfang believed that the material on Avanti could be further explored and made into a film series. Therefore, after two more trips to Xinjiang for research, Qu Jianfang organized a team and served as director, spending nine years to produce the 13-episode *The Story of Afanti* series. As late as the 1990s, "The Story of Afanti" was still being broadcast on television in Mainland China.

In 2022, Xigua Video and Huoshan Engine completed the "Classic Mid-Length Video 4K Restoration Project", which included the restoration of "The Story of Afanti" in 4K resolution. The texture and feel of the puppets in "The Story of Afanti" were delicately presented after the restoration.

== Plot ==
The Stories of Afanti comprises 14 stories. The single-episode series "Afanti" tells the story of "Planting Gold," while the animated series tells the stories of "Selling Shade," "The Rabbit Delivers the Message," "The Divine Healer," "A Battle of Wits," "The Donkey That Steals," "The Miser," "The Clever Case Solving," "The Donkey That Talks," "The Hunting Adventure," "Seeking Joy," "The Precious Donkey," "The Strange Marriage," and "The True and False Afanti." The stories of Afanti primarily focus on the witty, humorous, and eloquent commoner hero Afanti's battles against local bullies, the wealthy but unscrupulous landlord, the domineering Burke, and the cruel king.

Take the play "Planting Gold" from the single-episode play *Avanti* as an example: A wealthy man, blinded by greed, exploits the people through usury, earning widespread hatred. Avanti pretends to have become rich and lets the wealthy man know this. Envious, the wealthy man follows and monitors him for days, convinced that Avanti's "wealth" is grown in the desert using magic. He then "coerces" Avanti into planting gold for him. Avanti pretends to agree to cooperate on the condition of sharing the harvest equally. He then digs up the gold that the wealthy man has given him as seeds, which he has buried in the desert, and distributes it to the people—the rightful owners of the wealth. The wealthy man wants to keep the gold for himself and goes to dig alone, but finds nothing. Avanti tells the wealthy man that it was because he acted without authorization and misrecited the incantation that all the gold disappeared. The wealthy man ultimately suffers the consequences.

== Animation features ==
=== Character design ===
In *The Story of Afanti*, Afanti's image and actions are exaggerated, a stark contrast to the stereotypical, impersonal, upright characters with raised eyebrows, glaring eyes, and protruding bellies prevalent in 1970s Chinese films. He has a large head and small body, a crookedly wrapped turban, bulging eyes, an upturned mustache, and a small mouth. He often rides a donkey backward and speaks with his shoulders hunched and head held high. Although different from the mainstream positive images in films and television dramas at the time, he still evokes a sense of honesty, kindness, wit, and amiability. Similarly, the pot-bellied rich man is no longer the typical aggressive villain, but rather conveys greed and ignorance. All other characters also exhibit exaggerated and distorted characteristics.

The character of Afanti in "The Story of Afanti" has several prototypes. During his research trip to Xinjiang, Qu Jianfang encountered a tall, thin Uyghur man in his thirties with a goatee, a high nose, and bright eyes. Qu Jianfang combined this man with another middle-aged Uyghur man who was known for his chivalry and humor, resulting in the prototype of Afanti. The shape of Afanti's fingers and the design of his eyebrows were inspired by some Tang dynasty wooden figurines in the Xinjiang Uygur Autonomous Region Museum. His eyebrows also exhibit characteristics of Uyghur script. The prototypes of the wealthy man and his wife were chosen from a wealthy Uyghur family visited by the creative team during their research trip.

=== Props and music ===
The characters in "The Story of Afanti" wear clothing with distinctive Uyghur characteristics. For example, Afanti wears a salam (white turban) and a white chapan (چاپان, a long outer garment), a traditional Uyghur garment. The props are also thoughtfully designed; the little donkey is Afanti's good friend, so instead of using a whip, Afanti gestures and shouts in the air with a leafy branch, and the donkey understands his meaning. Afanti has a gourd, a prop designed specifically for him by Qu Jianfang, who observed that old farmers would put some kind of herbal medicine or snuff in the gourd to refresh themselves. Besides the character design and props, the music in *The Story of Afanti* also uses a lot of Uyghur folk music, including instruments such as the satar, rawap, and hand drum, and also showcases scenes of Muqam (Xinjiang Uyghur Muqam art). The theme song for the single-episode series *Afanti* has lyrics by Jin Xi, music by Wu Yingju, and vocals by Ma Guoguang; the theme song for the animated series, *Everyone Calls Me Afanti*, is composed by Jin Fuzai and Zhou Ji; the opening theme for the first episode is sung in both Uyghur and Chinese by Patar Reyim; the ending themes for the second and third episodes and the opening theme for the fifth episode are sung in Chinese by Nazar Simayier; other episodes have music but no vocals.

=== Differences from literary images ===
"The Story of Afanti" originates from the literary figure of Afanti, but with some modifications and selections. First, the animation significantly alters content related to Islam. Aside from occasional mentions of "God's blessing" and direct references to religion in individual episodes, the animation rarely features clergy and religious activities common in the literature. Religious judges from the literature are replaced with secular judges, and satire of clergy is often replaced with satire of wealthy landowners and officials. Second, while the literary stories of Afanti rarely feature beautiful love stories, the episodes "The Precious Donkey" and "The Strange Marriage" in the animation respectively tell the tales of Afanti punishing a tax official who wants to marry the prime minister's daughter and helping a poor young man marry the daughter of a wealthy landowner. Third, the literary image of Afanti is not consistent; the humorous jokes of teasing ordinary people and taking advantage of others are either omitted or intentionally adapted in the animation to reflect Afanti's humor and seemingly foolish wisdom. Fourth, in literature, Afanti has a wife and children and has been married multiple times, but his marital status is not mentioned in "The Story of Afanti". In "The Rabbit Delivers the Letter", the plot of delivering the letter to his wife is changed to delivering it to the old man next door.

== Awards ==
The long production cycle of "The Story of Afanti" resulted in different episodes competing for different awards. In 1979, the single-episode series "Afanti" won the Ministry of Culture's 1979 Outstanding Film Award for Animated Film and the 3rd Hundred Flowers Awards for Best Animated Film in 1980. The third episode, "The Divine Healer," won the 1st Prize for Short Animation at the Chicago International Children's Film Festival. In 1994, the "Stories of Afanti" series, under the name "Afanti," won the first prize for animated film at the inaugural National Minority Theme Film Tenglong Awards.

In 1983, the second installment, "The Rabbit Delivers the Letter," was nominated for the Best Animated Feature Film at the 4th Golden Rooster Awards.

In November 2022, the "100 Classic Chinese Children's Films in 100 Years" selection event initiated by the China Children and Youth Film Society ranked the 1979 single-episode drama "Avanti" as the eighth.

== Derivative works and reception ==
In the 2010s, the Shanghai Animation Film Studio, the producer of "The Story of Afanti," released "The Complete Collection of Chinese Classic Animations," authored by Afanti and written by Wang Yazhou, published by Southern Publishing House. The "Complete Collection of The Story of Afanti" used high-definition original images from the puppet animation of "The Story of Afanti" as material. At the same time, the Electronic Industry Press published two books, "Classic Comics of Afanti" and "Selected Stories of Afanti," illustrated by Qu Jianfang, the art designer and series animation director of "The Story of Afanti," and compiled by Dalian Afanti International Animation Co., Ltd. The books used some character designs from "The Story of Afanti."

However, this led to a lawsuit between Shanghai Animation Film Studio and Qu Jianfang. Shanghai Animation Film Studio argued that the copyright of the puppet characters, including the three-dimensional and static two-dimensional figures of "Afanti," belonged to the studio, and that the Electronic Industry Press and Qu Jianfang had used the characters from the puppet animation "The Story of Afanti" for profit without permission. Therefore, the studio sued them. Ultimately, the Xuhui District People's Court of Shanghai and the Shanghai Intellectual Property Court issued first-instance and final judgments respectively, ruling that the copyright of the artwork depicting Afanti and other characters in question was jointly owned by Shanghai Animation Film Studio and Qu Jianfang. Prior to this, in 2007, Qu Jianfang sued Beijing Afanti Investment Management Co., Ltd. and others because the image of Afanti in the advertisement was basically the same as the image of Afanti in "The Story of Afanti". The court ruled that the latter had infringed on his rights.

In October 2018, the 3D animated film *The Adventures of Afanti*, based on the story of Afanti, was released. The characters in the film were designed in a puppet animation style. The film tells the story of Afanti and his companions on their journey to find the source of water. In addition to showcasing Afanti's wit, *The Adventures of Afanti* also displays his courage. Before the film's release, Wuxi Metro collaborated with Shanghai Animation Film Studio to launch commemorative metro tickets and themed trains based on *The Adventures of Afanti*.
