= Elihu Vedder =

American painter (1836–1923)

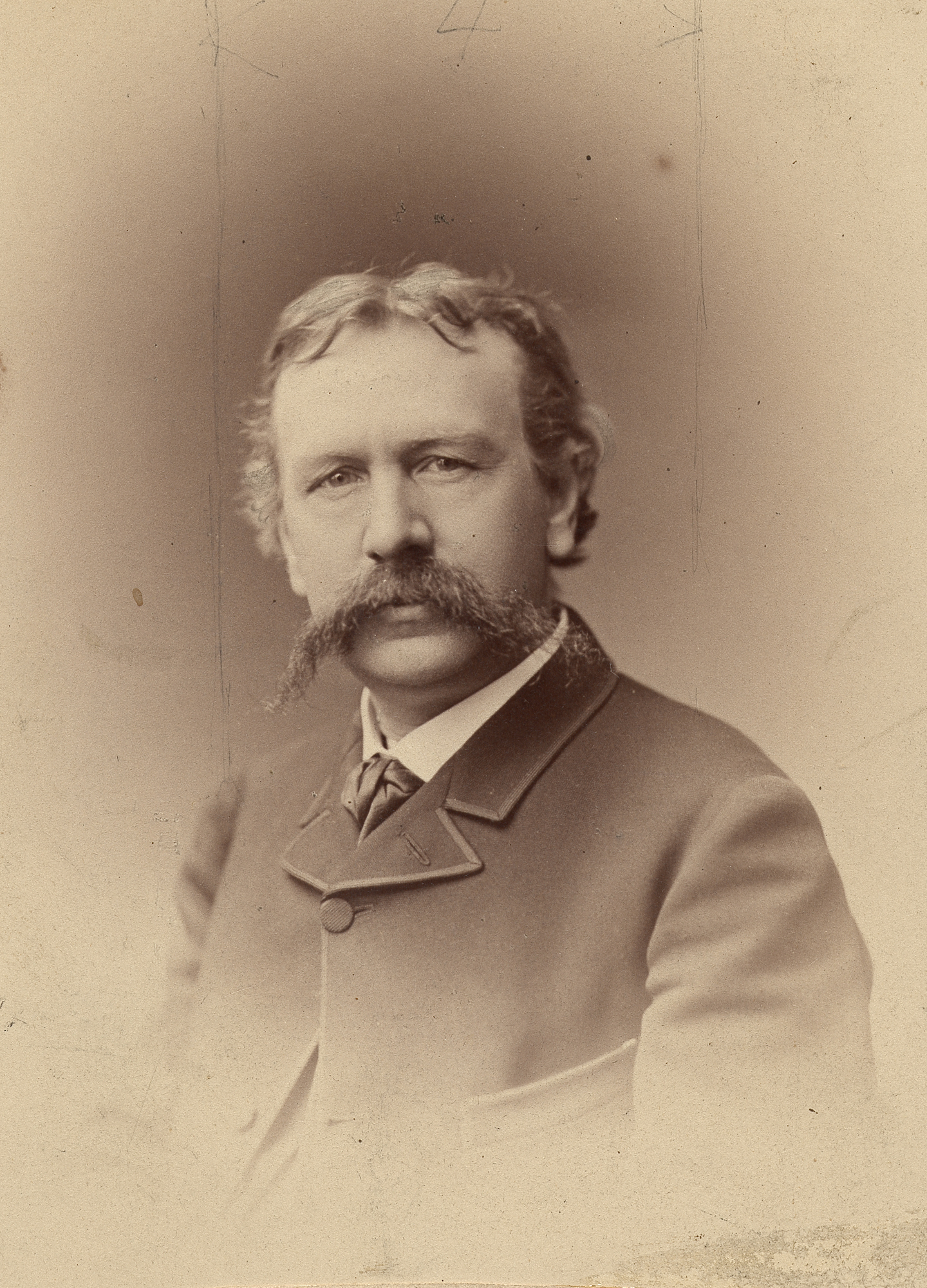
- Vedder in 1870
- Born: 26 February 1836; New York City, U.S.
- Died: 29 January 1923 (aged 86); Rome, Kingdom of Italy
- Known for: Drawing; Oil painting Mural painting
- Movement: Symbolism; Orientalism
- Spouse: Caroline Rosekrans (m. 1869)
- Children: 4

Elihu Vedder (26 February 1836 – 29 January 1923) was an American symbolist painter, book illustrator and poet from New York City. He is best known for his fifty-five illustrations for Edward FitzGerald's translation of The Rubaiyat of Omar Khayyam (deluxe edition, published by Houghton Mifflin).

== Biography ==
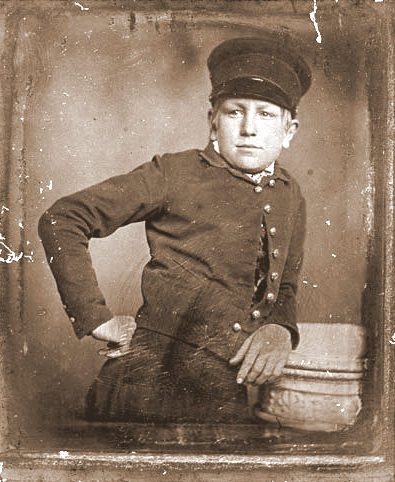
Daguerreotype of Vedder as a schoolboy in 1847

Elihu Vedder was born on 26 February 1836 in New York City, the son of Elihu Vedder Sr. and Elizabeth Vedder. His parents were cousins. His father, a dentist, decided to try his luck in Cuba, and this had a profound impact on Elihu Jr.'s childhood. The remainder of his childhood was spent between his maternal grandfather Alexander Vedder's house in Schenectady and a boarding school. His mother supported his goals to be an artist while his father reluctantly assented, convinced that his son should try a different occupation. His brother, Alexander Madison Vedder, was a Navy surgeon who witnessed the transformation of Japan into a modern culture while he was stationed there.

Vedder trained in New York City with Tompkins H. Matteson, then in Paris with François-Édouard Picot. Finally, he completed his studies in Italy - where he was strongly influenced not only by Italian Renaissance work but also by the modern Macchiaioli painters and the living Italian landscape.

He first visited Italy from 1858 until 1860, becoming deeply emotionally attached to fellow painter Giovanni Costa. Their idyllic trips through the Italian countryside were cut short because Vedder's father cut off his financial allowance.

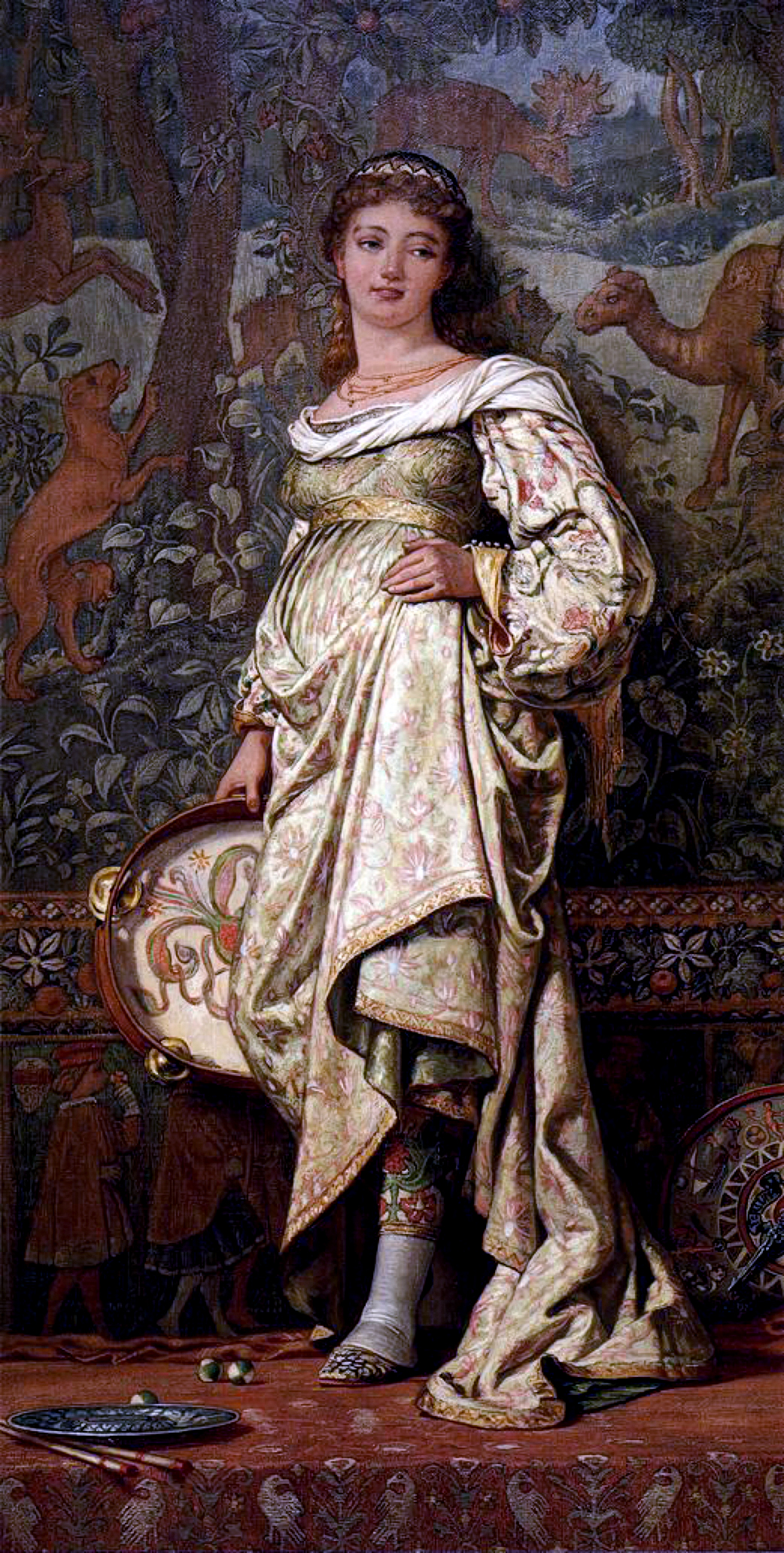
Dancing Girl, oil on canvas, 1871. Reynolds House Museum of American Art

Penniless, Vedder returned to the United States during the American Civil War and made a small living undertaking commercial illustrations. He was involved in the bohemian 'Pfaff's' coffee house group and painted some of his most memorable paintings notable for their visionary nature, romantic imagery and often Oriental influences. Paintings of this time include The Roc's Egg, The Fisherman and the Genii, and one of his most famous works, Lair of the Sea Serpent. In the United States, Vedder sought out and befriended Walt Whitman, Herman Melville and William Morris Hunt. Vedder became a member of the American Academy of Arts and Letters in 1865. At the end of the Civil War, Vedder left America to live in Italy.

He married Caroline Rosekrans on 13 July 1869 in Glen Falls, New York. Elihu Vedder and his wife had four children, only two of whom survived. His daughter Anita Herriman Vedder played a vital role in handling the business of her father, who was notorious for his general aloofness towards details. Elihu's son Enoch Rosekrans Vedder was a promising architect who married jewelry designer Angela Reston. Enoch died while visiting his parents in Italy on 2 April 1916. Elihu had a home in Rome and - after the financial success of his 1884 Rubaiyat work - on the Isle of Capri, then a haven for male aesthetes.

Vedder visited England many times, and was influenced by the Pre-Raphaelites, and was a friend of Simeon Solomon. He was also influenced by the work of English and Irish mystics such as William Blake and William Butler Yeats. In 1890 Vedder helped establish the In Arte Libertas group in Italy.

Tiffany commissioned him to design glassware, mosaics and statuettes for the company. He decorated the hallway of the Reading Room of the Washington Library of Congress, and his mural paintings can still be seen there.

Vedder occasionally returned to the United States, but lived only in Italy from 1906 until his death on 29 January 1923. He is buried in the Protestant Cemetery, Rome. There are no known living descendants of Elihu Vedder as both surviving children died without issue.

== Exhibitions ==
In 2008, the Smithsonian American Art Museum organized an exhibition of Vedder's Rubaiyat illustrations that toured several museums, including the Phoenix Art Museum.

== Gallery ==
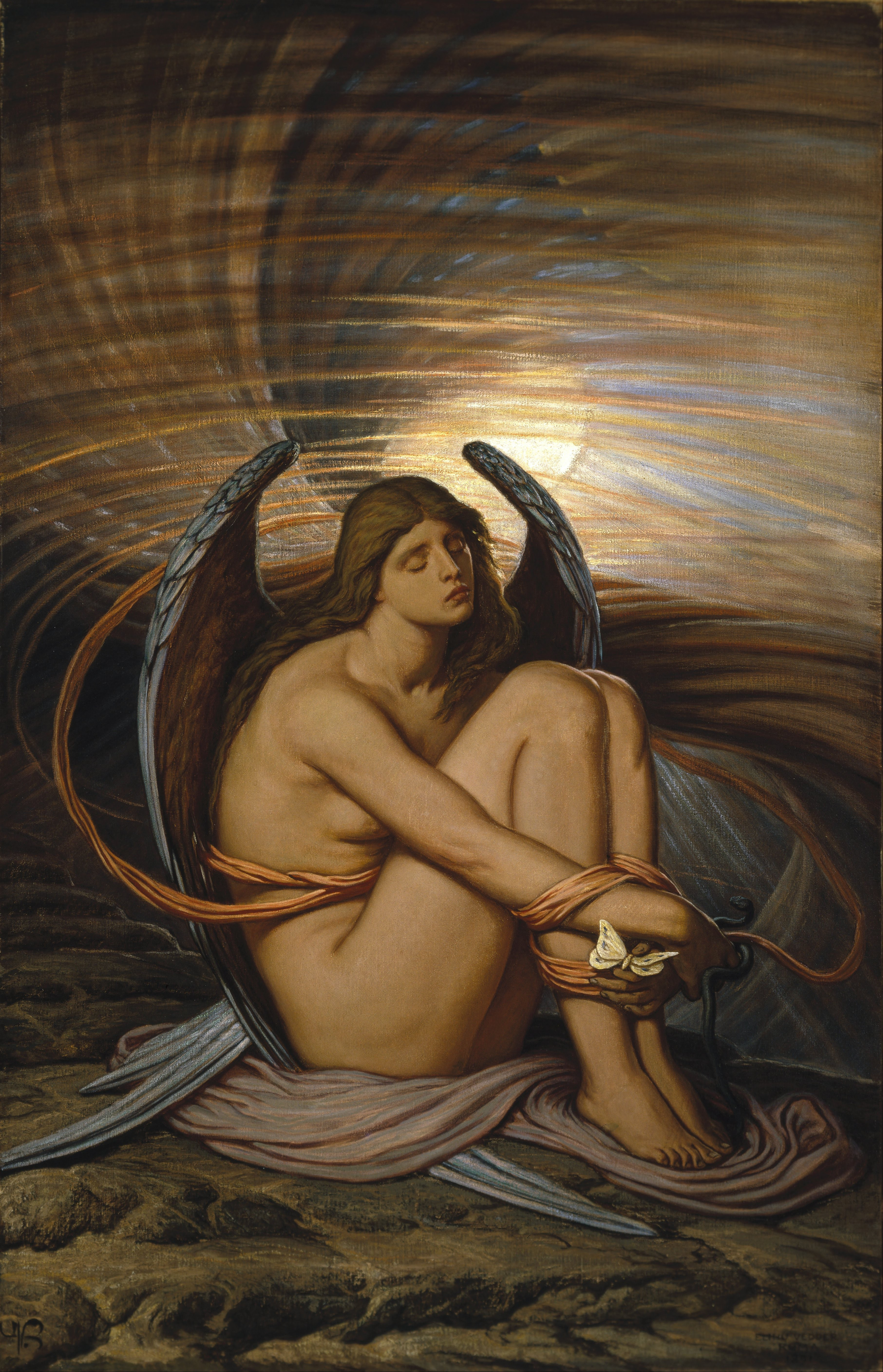
Soul in Bondage, 1891–92. Brooklyn Museum

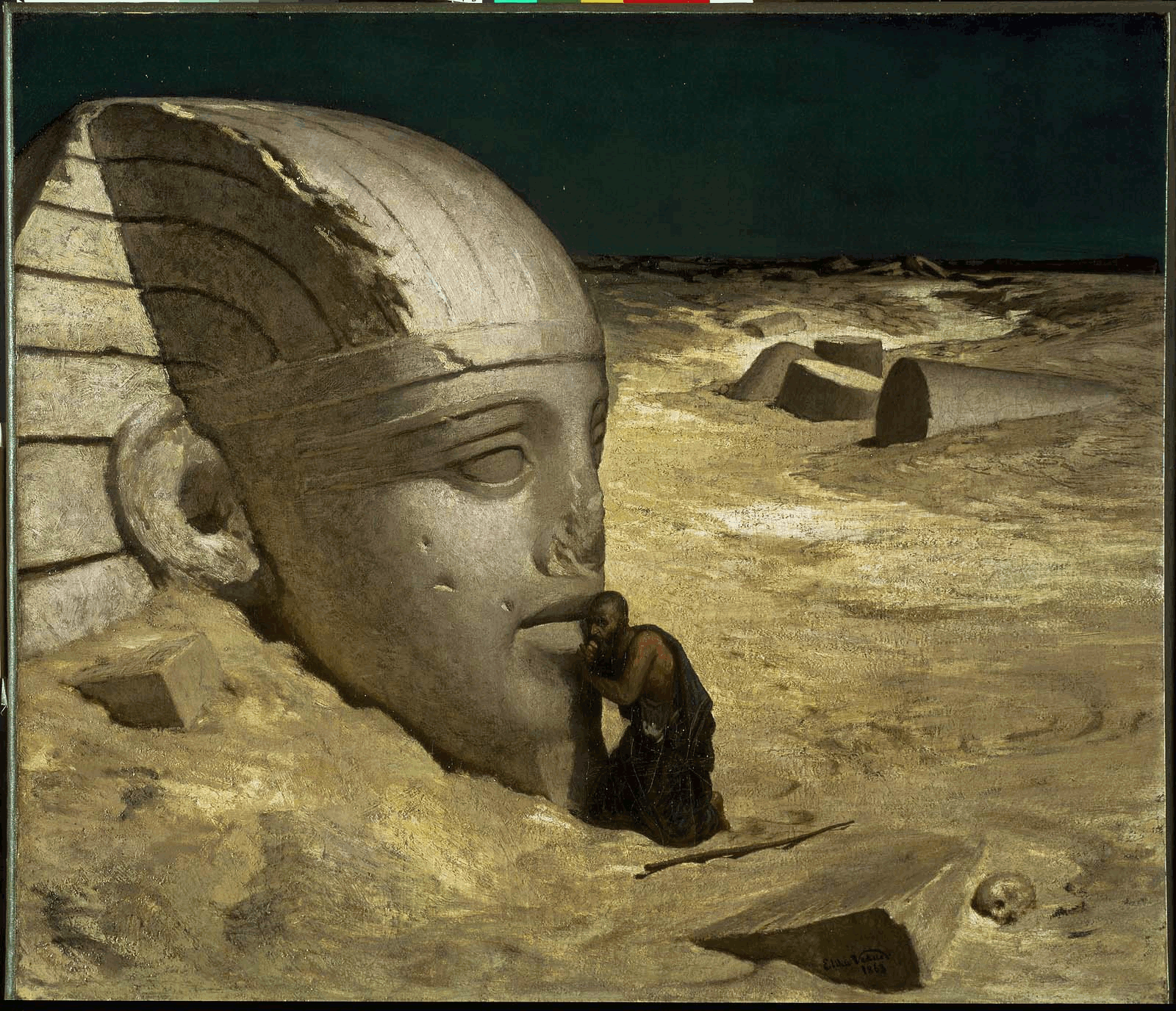
The Questioner of the Sphinx (1863)

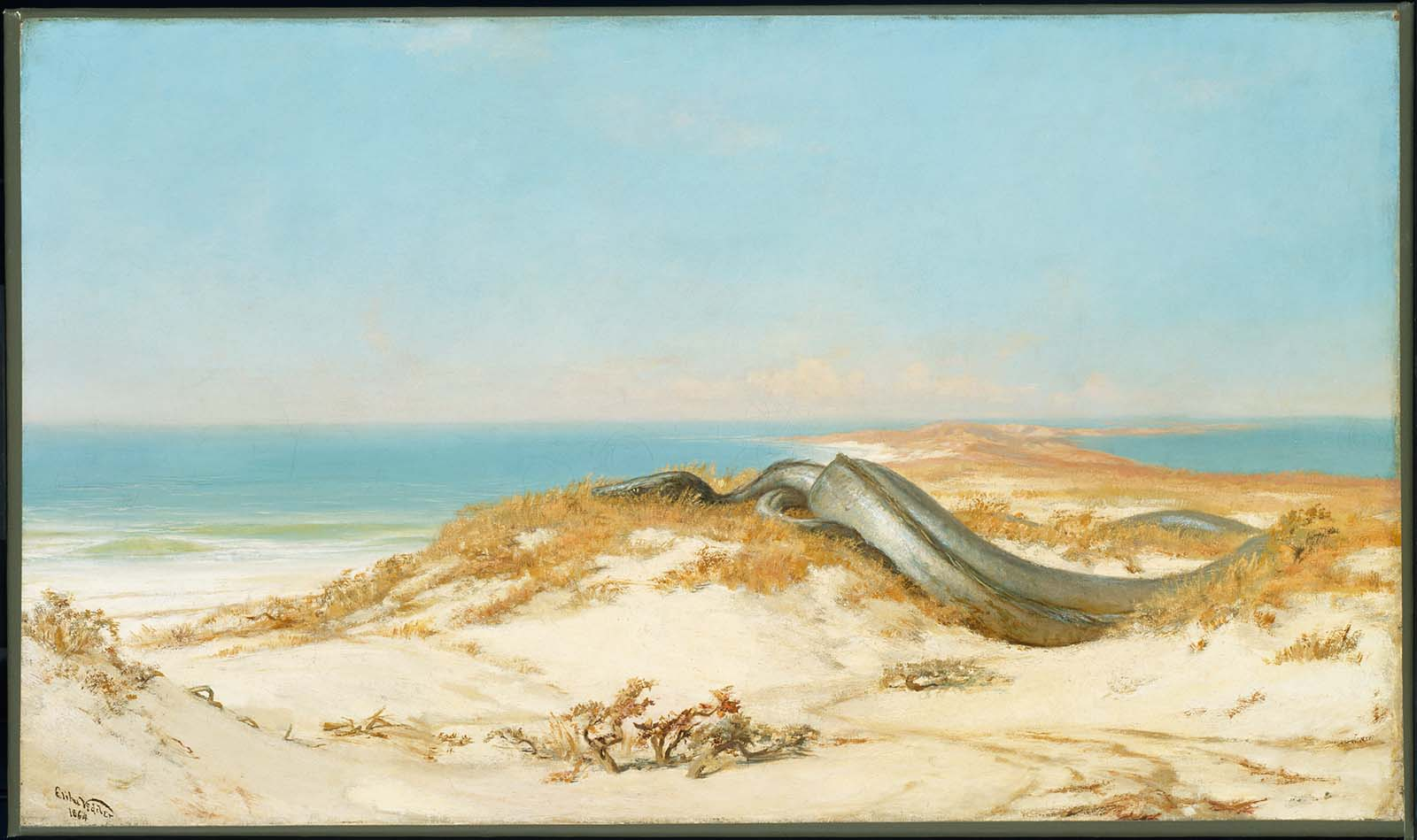
Lair of the Sea Serpent, 1864, MFA Boston

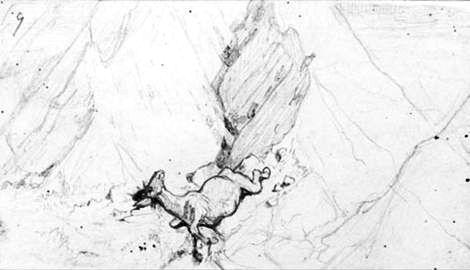
9th study for The miller, his son and the donkey (1867/8)

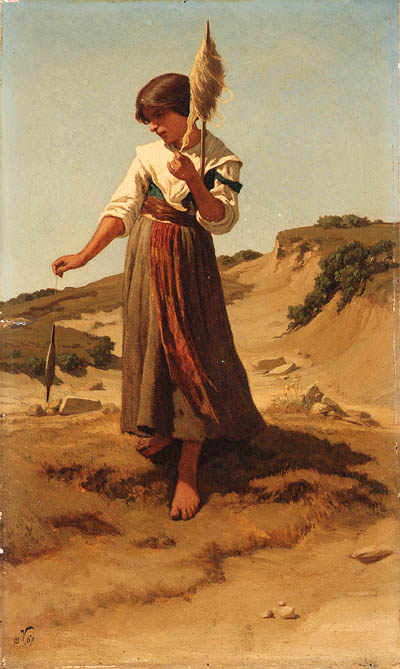
Peasant Girl Spinning (1867)

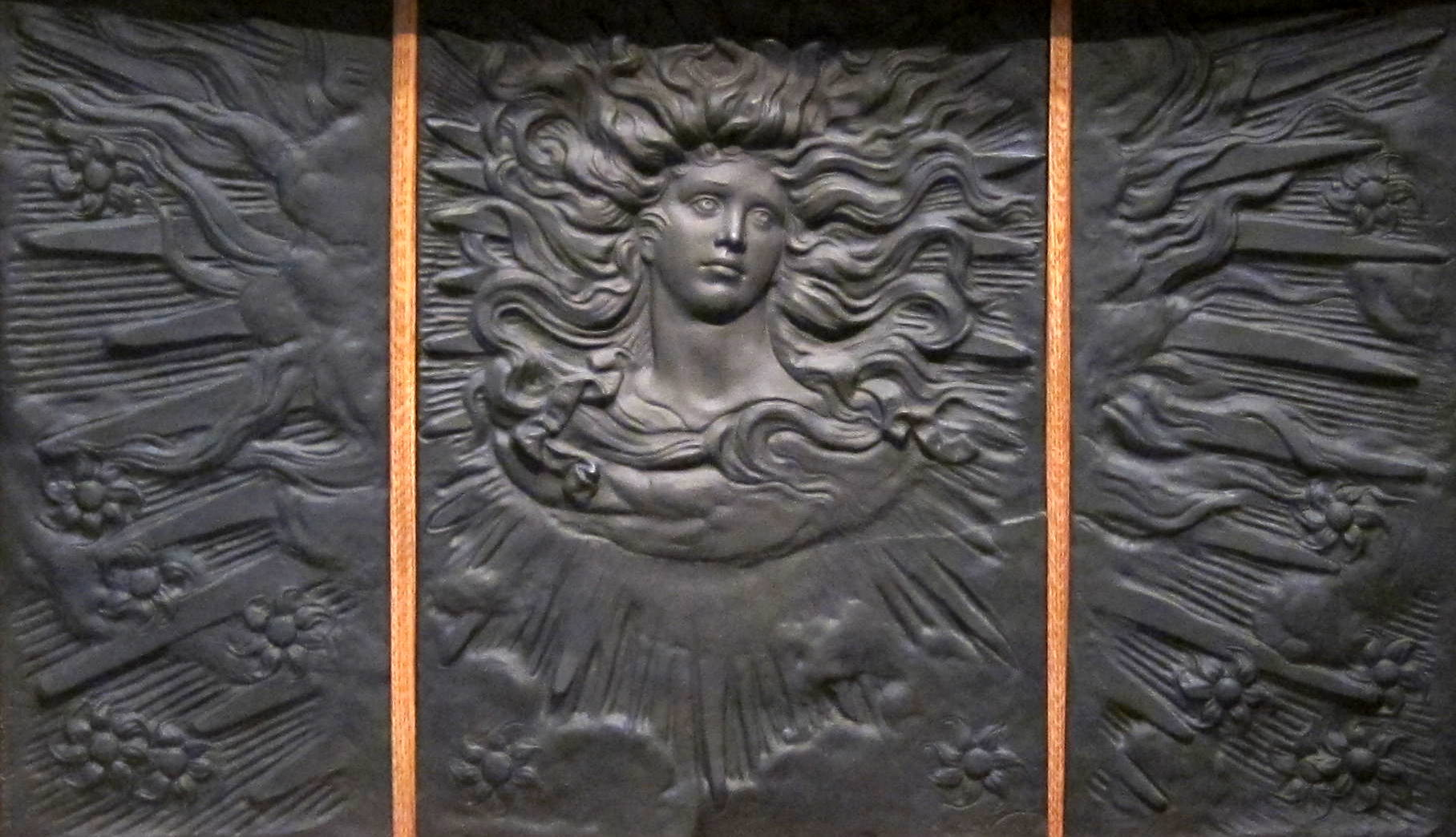
The Sun God (1882)

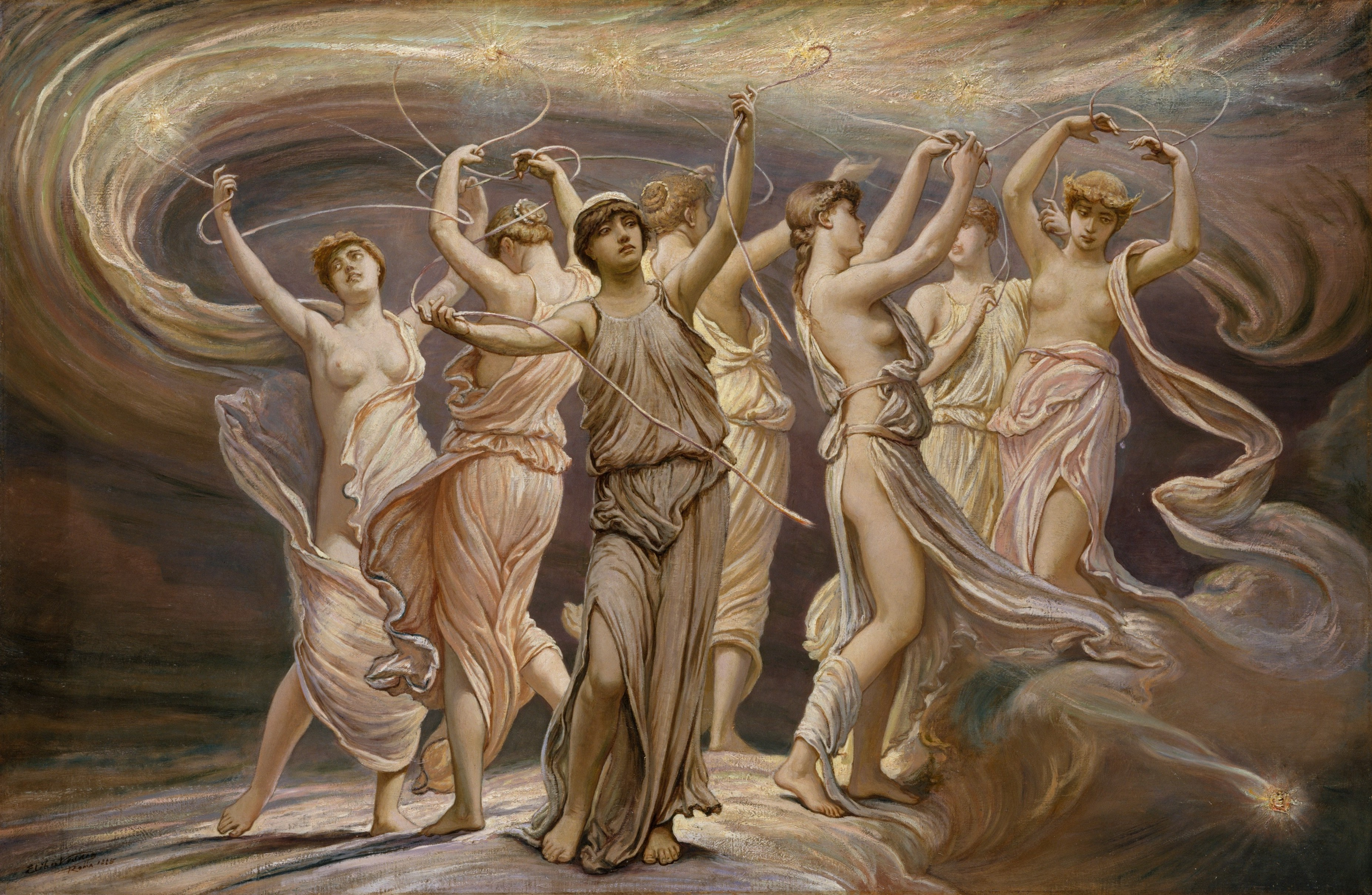
The Pleiades (1885)

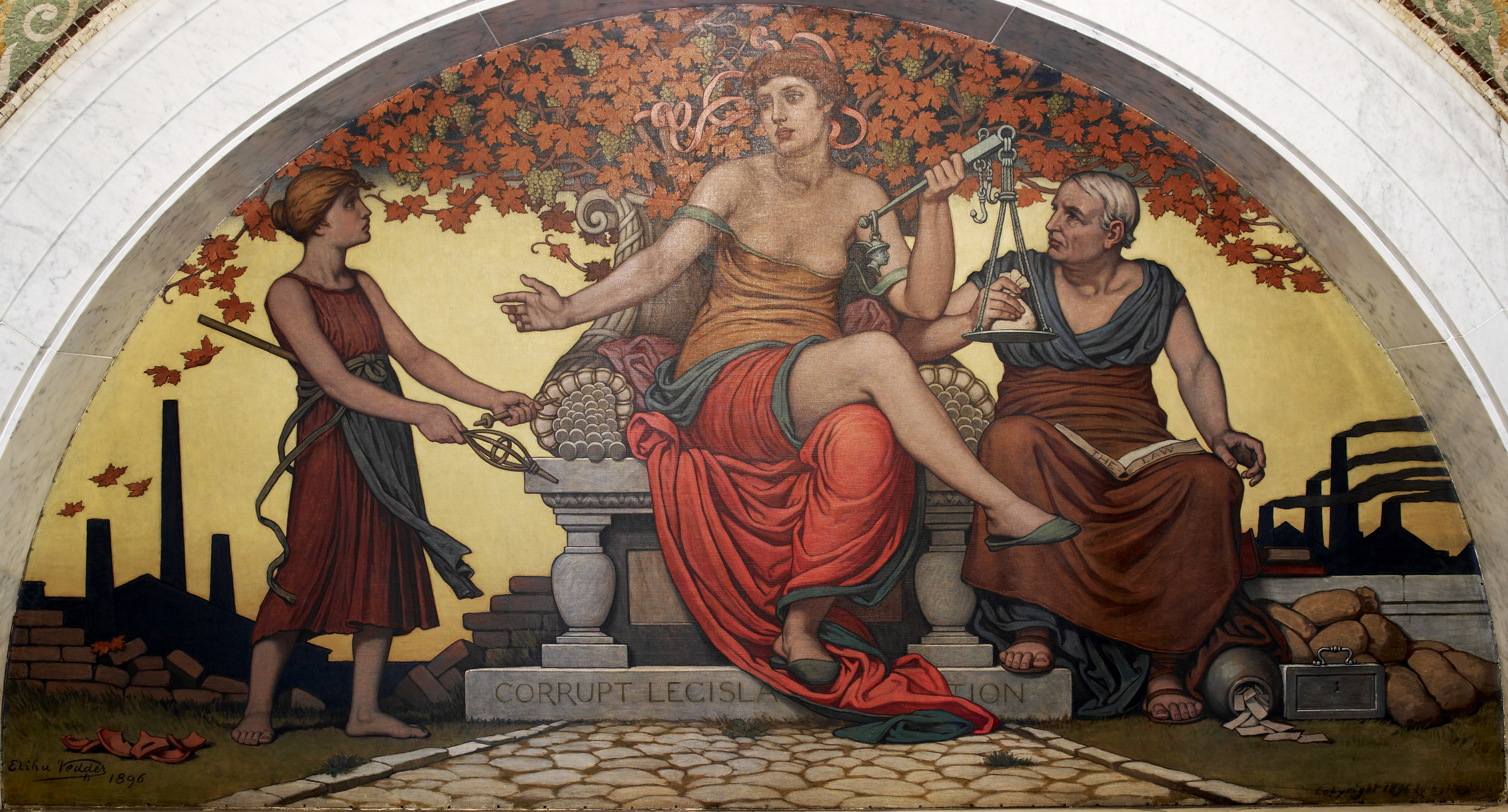
Mural, Lobby to Main Reading Room, Library of Congress Thomas Jefferson Building, Washington, D.C. Main figure is seated atop a pedestal saying "CORRUPT LEGISLATION".

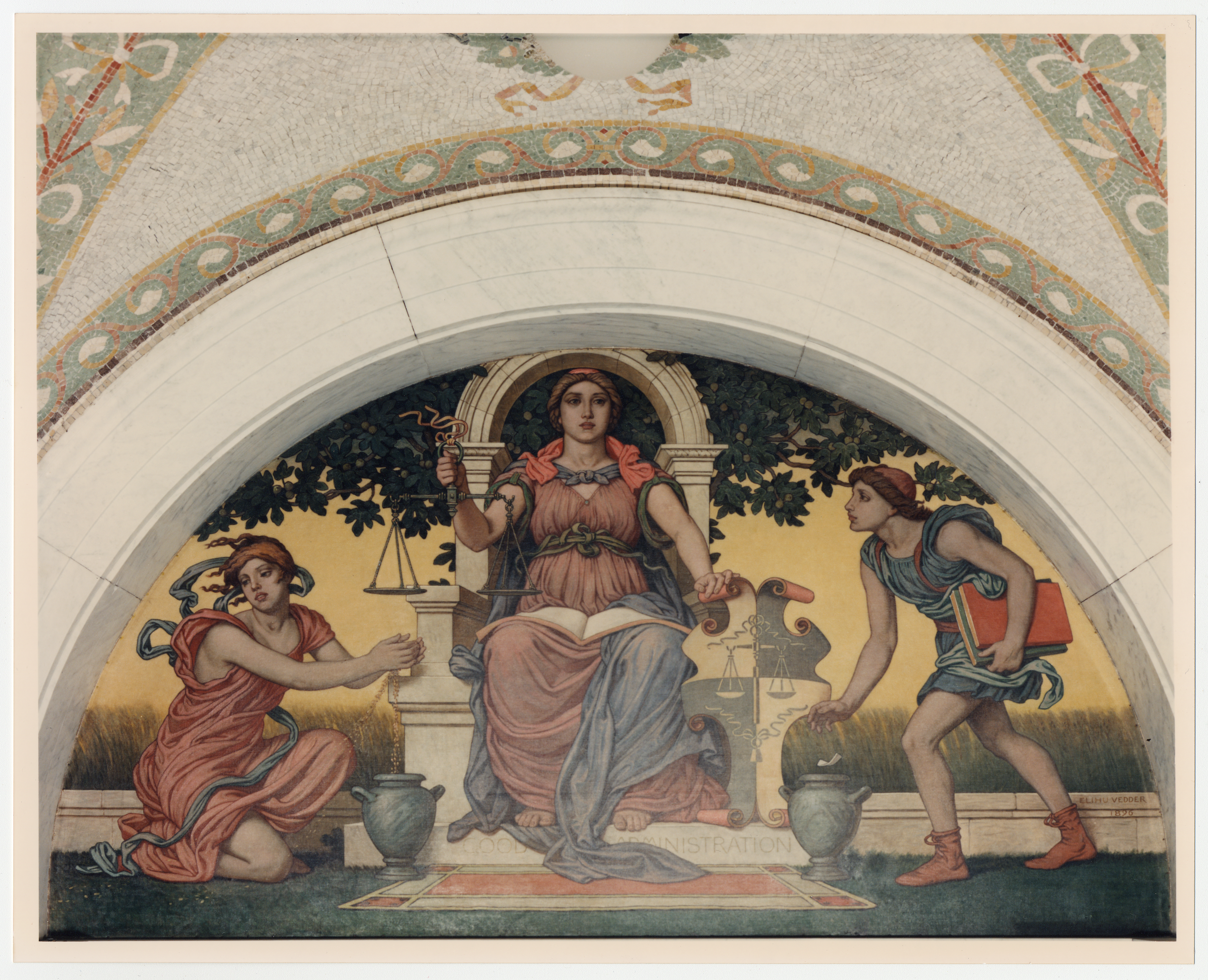
"Good Administration" mural by Elihu Vedder, Jefferson Building, Library of Congress LCCN2005675761

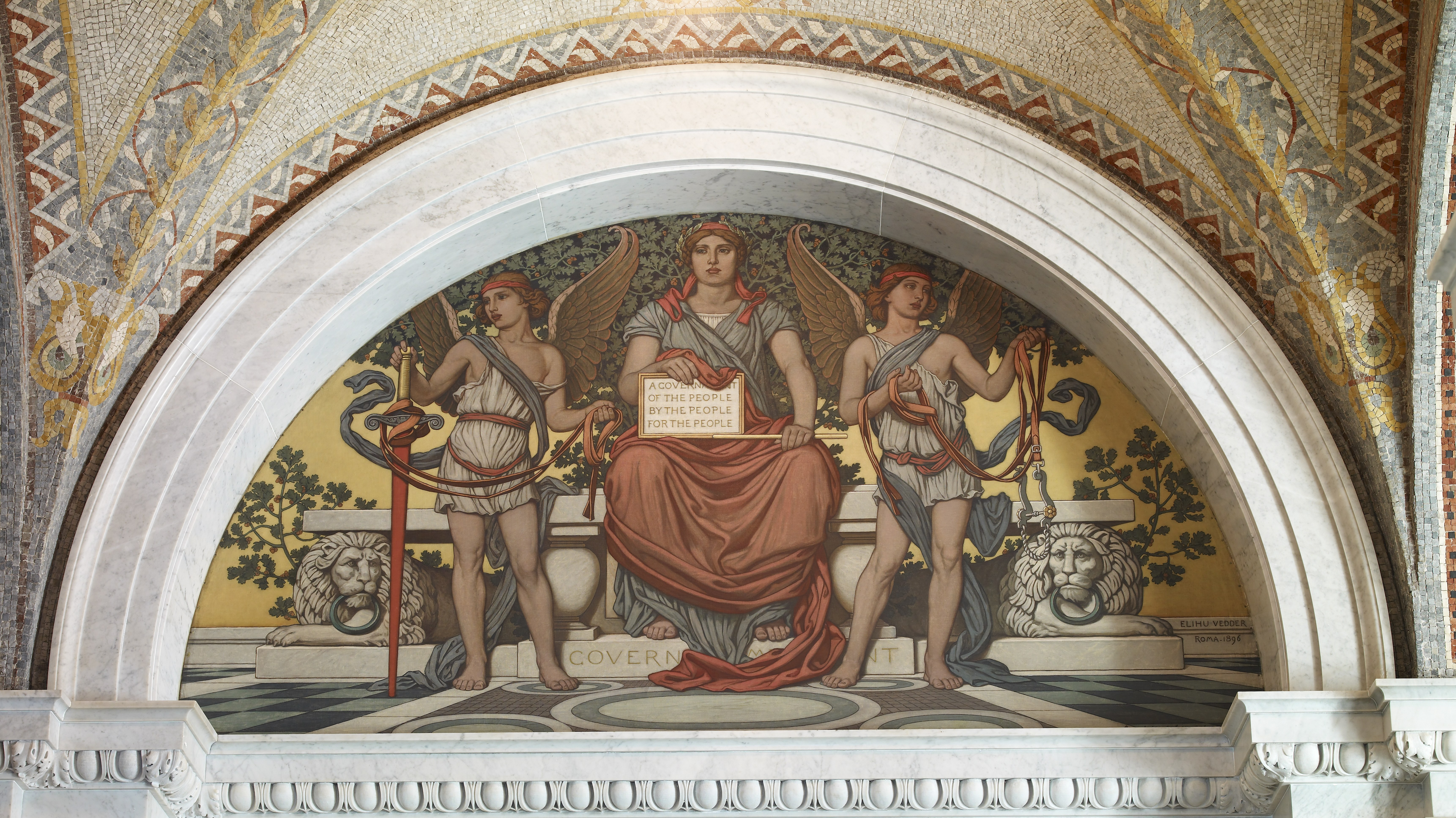
Government. Mural, Lobby to Main Reading Room, Library of Congress Thomas Jefferson Building, Washington, D.C. Main figure is seated atop a pedestal ("GOVERNMENT") holding a tablet with "A GOVERNMENT / OF THE PEOPLE / BY THE PEOPLE / FOR THE PEOPLE".

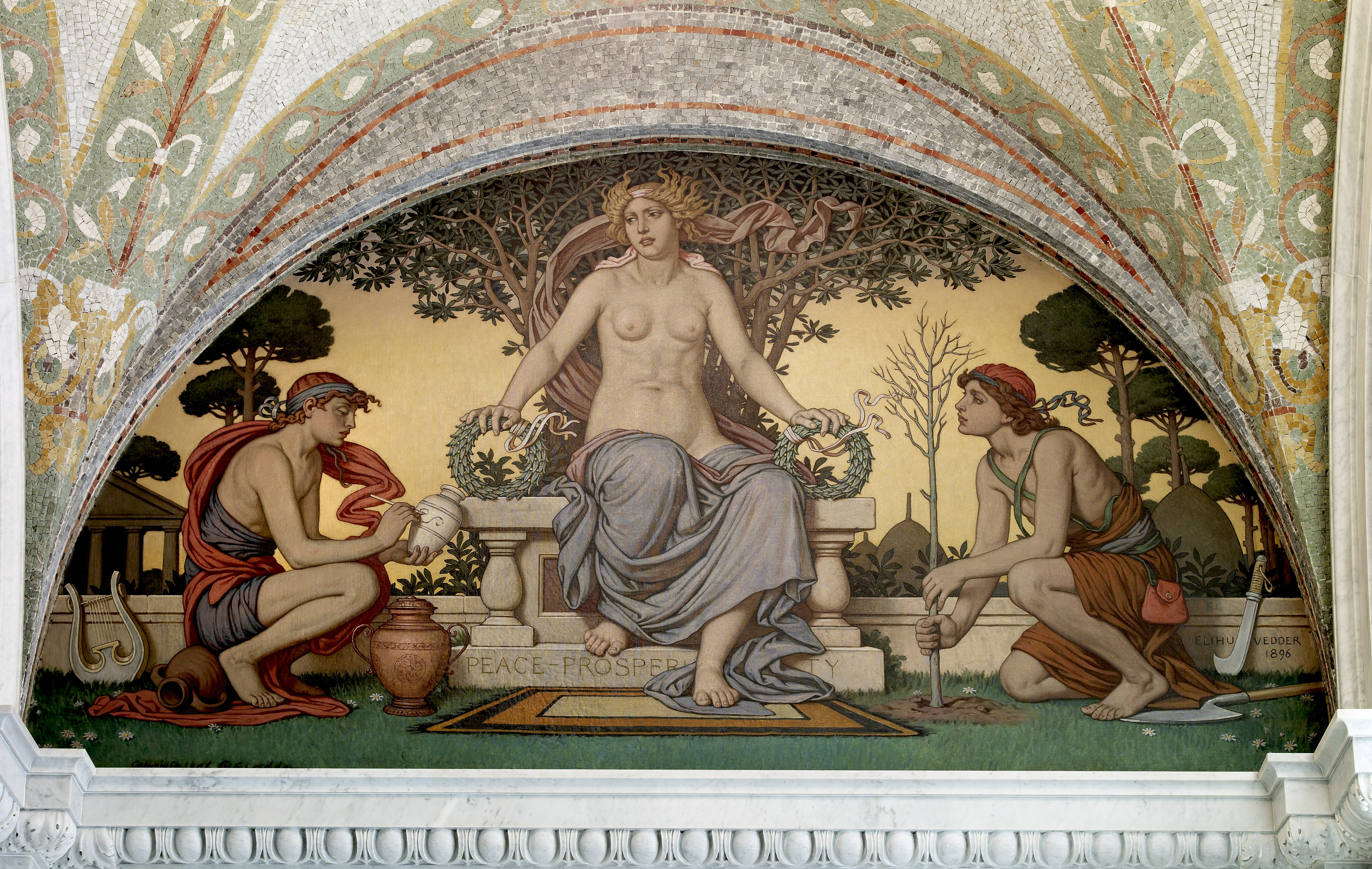
Peace and Prosperity (1896)

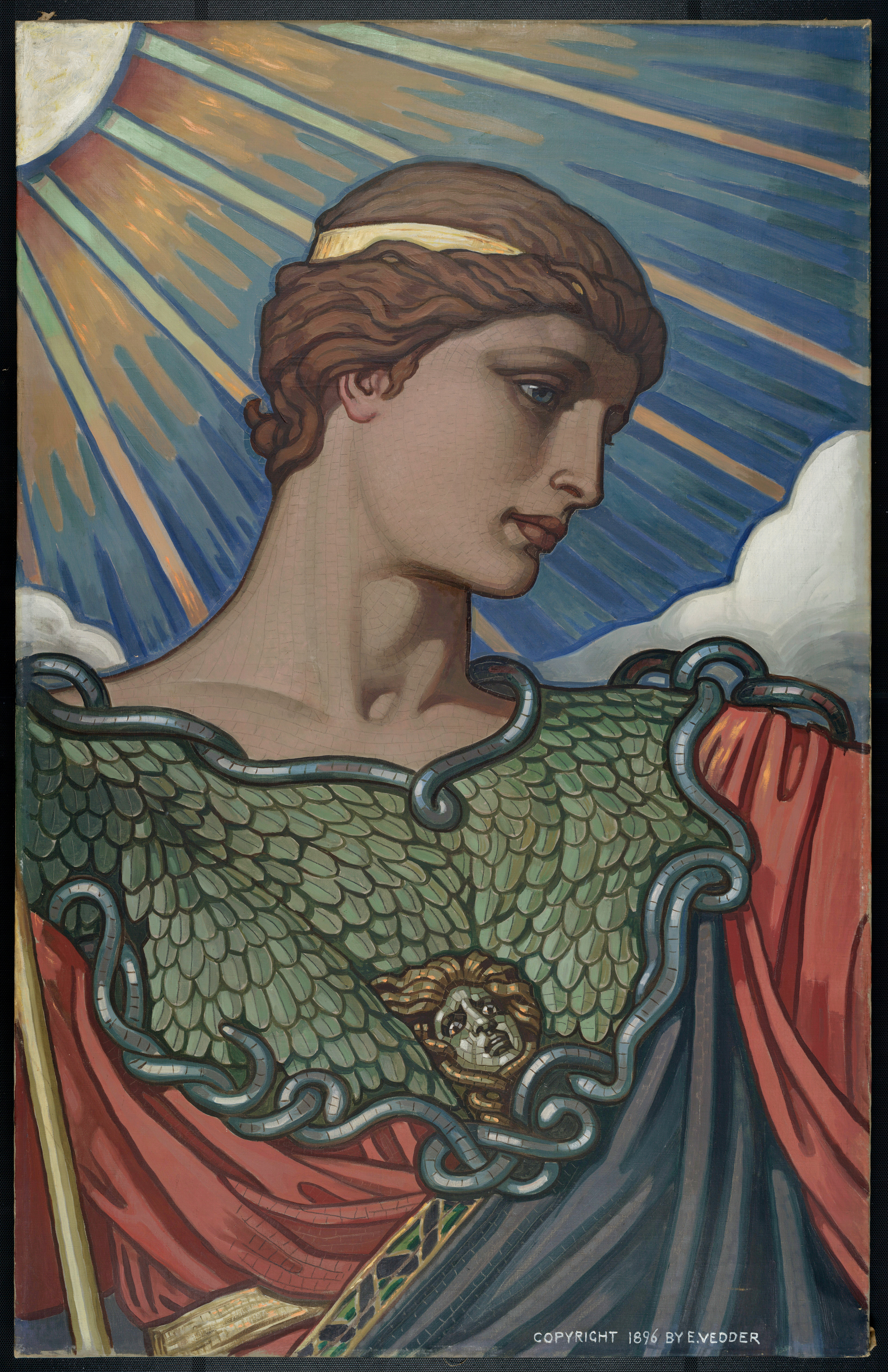
Minerva, 1896 (preparatory study)

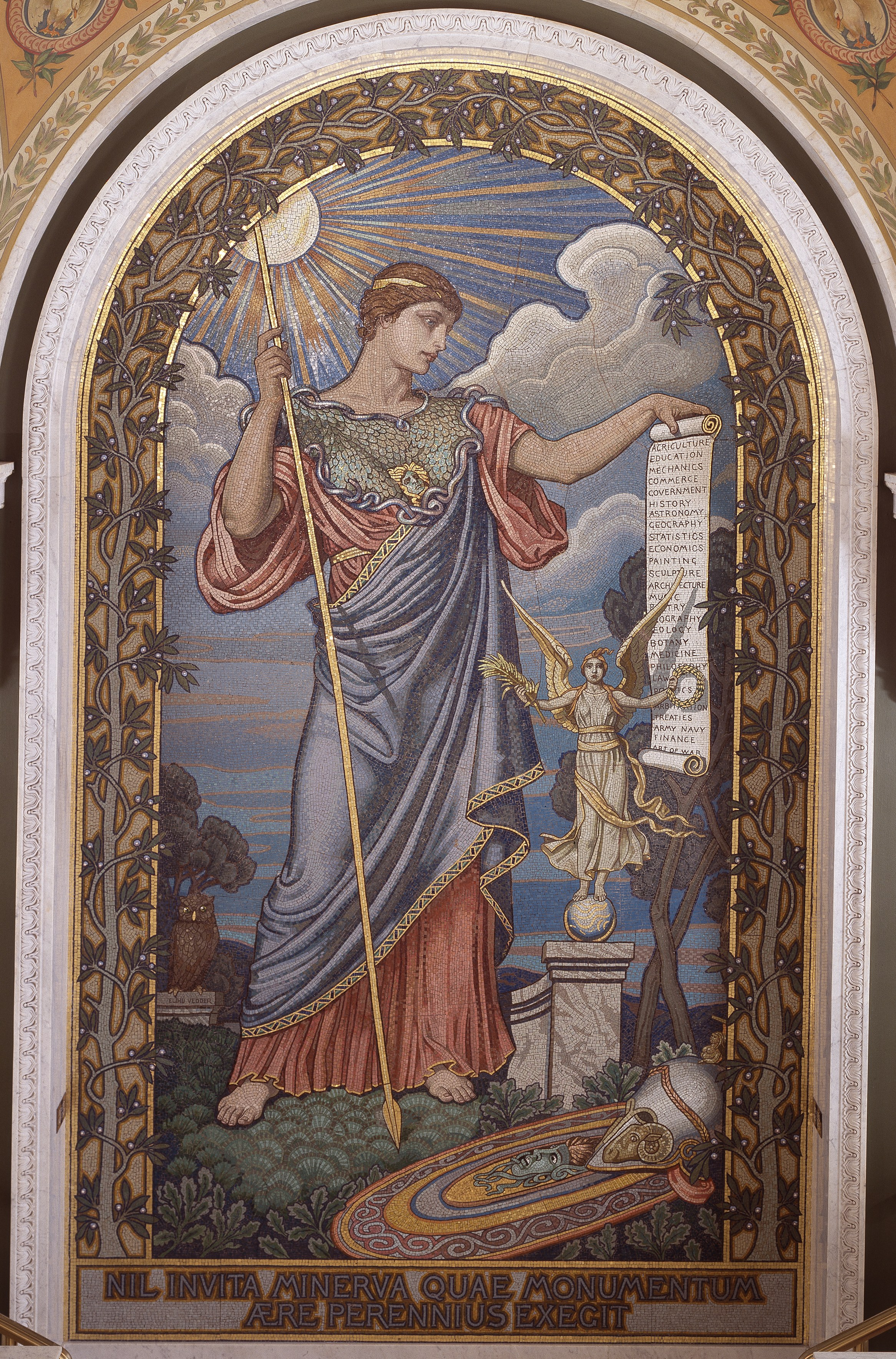
Minerva, 1896 (mosaic at the Library of Congress) with Nil invita Minerva, quae monumentum aere perennius exegit from Horace's Ars Poetica

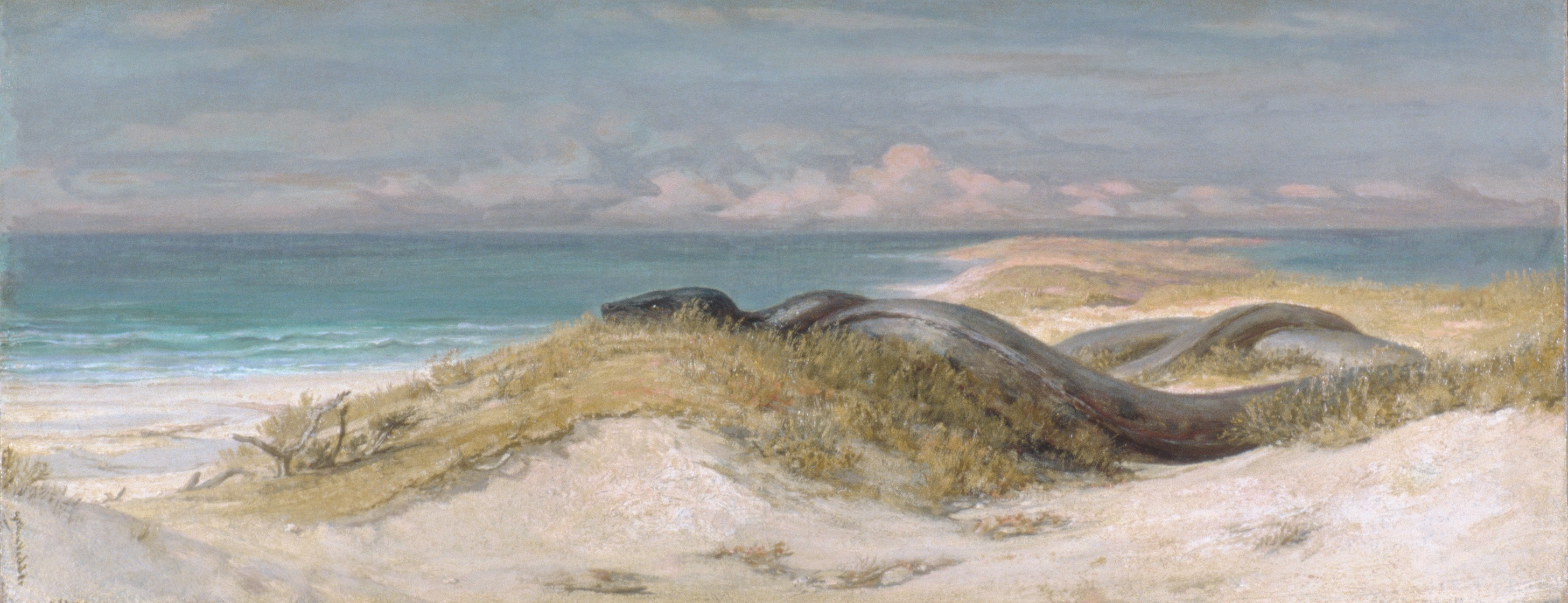
Lair of the Sea Serpent, 1899, The Met
