= Leonid Solovyov (writer) =

Russian playwright (1906–1962)

- Born: August 19, 1906; Tripoli, Syria
- Died: April 9, 1962 (aged 55); Leningrad, Soviet Union

Leonid Vasilyevich Solovyov (Russian: Леони́д Васи́льевич Соловьёв) (August 19, 1906 – April 9, 1962) was a Russian writer and playwright.

== Life and works ==
Born in Tripoli, Syria (now Lebanon) where his father taught at the Russian consulate, he began writing as a newspaper correspondent (in Uzbek) for the Pravda Vostoka, published in Tashkent. His first stories and sketches of life in Central Asia and the Middle East appeared in that newspaper and led to several collections of short stories.

His first book was Lenin in Eastern Folk Art (Moscow, 1930), which he described as "a volume of Central Asian post-revolutionary folklore." He is known for The Book of My Youth, and Tale of Hodja Nasreddin. It is based on the tales of the Middle Eastern folk hero Nasreddin (much as the 19th Century Belgian Charles De Coster based his own "Thyl Ulenspiegel and Lamme Goedzak" on the similar North European folk hero Till Eulenspiegel).

During the Second World War, Solovyov served as a war correspondent and produced several wartime stories and screenplays. He also served for some time during that war in the Russian Navy, and several novels grew from his experiences there.

In 1946, Solovyov was accused of conspiring to commit acts of terrorism against the Soviet state. He was interned in several prison camps until 1954, when he was cleared of all charges and released. The second part of The Tale of Hodja Nasreddin, subtitled "The Enchanted Prince", was written in the Dubravlag forced labor camp and completed around 1950. After his release, Solovyov settled in Leningrad. The two parts of The Tale of Hodja Nasreddin were published together for the first time in 1956 and enjoyed a very favorable reception.

The Tale of Hodja Nasreddin contains two novels: Disturber of the Peace, or Hodja Nasreddin in Bokhara (Возмутитель спокойствия) and The Enchanted Prince (Очарованный принц). The whole novel has been translated into dozens of languages including Turkish, Persian, Bengali, Hindi, Uzbek and Hebrew.

Both volumes were translated into English, the first appearing in the United States as Disturber of the Peace (1940), reprinted in 1956 as The Beggar in the Harem. Impudent Adventures in Old Bukhara (in England as Adventures in Bukhara). A new translation was released in 2009 under the title The Tale of Hodja Nasreddin: Disturber of the Peace (Translit Publishing, November 2009). The second volume appeared in 1957 as The Enchanted Prince.

The book was translated into Hebrew and adapted as a very successful play presented by the Cameri Theater in Tel Aviv, and revived on several later occasions. The satirical song "In Beautiful Bokahara" (בבוכרה היפה), derived from the play, gained a life of its own, being performed by various well-known Israeli singers such as Arik Lavi and Nissim Garameh

Leonid Solovyov also wrote many screenplays including one based on Nikolai Gogol's story "The Overcoat".
