= Peasant Girl, spinning =

1867 painting by Elihu Vedder

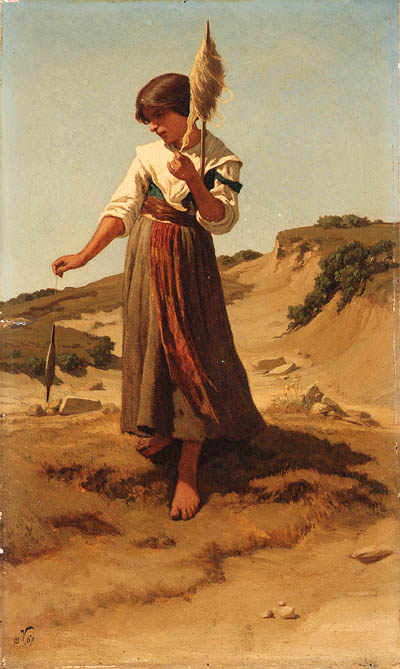
- Artist: Elihu Vedder
- Year: 1867
- Type: Oil on canvas
- Dimensions: 40.7 cm × 24.7 cm (16.0 in × 9.7 in)

Peasant Girl, spinning is the title given by nineteenth century American expatriate artist Elihu Vedder to an oil painting on canvas that depicts a young female figure spinning wool into thread. The work was completed in 1867 at the artist's studio in Via Margutta, Rome, and represents a slightly scaled up, slightly elaborated version of a theme Vedder had first developed in an oil sketch during the summer of the same year.

== Description ==
The painting depicts a young peasant girl, standing in profile on a hillside, transferring wool fibers from a distaff to a spindle that dangles from her right hand. She is barefoot and wears traditional costume consisting of a white shirt with sleeves rolled up, a blue frock, and a tattered red apron that sways in the wind. Strewn rocks and sparse tufts of vegetation punctuate a dry and otherwise barren landscape on what a combination of bright areas of paint and corresponding shadows suggest to have been a hot summer day.

In this early work from relatively shortly after Vedder's first arrival in Italy, dramatic movement is conveyed across both horizontal and vertical axes of the picture plane as the girl appears to step forward down the hillside and the spindle whirls, spinning thread from the distaff, midair. The serpentine outline of the girl's arm against the backdrop of the blue sky suggests an elegant line of beauty, which is mirrored in the contours of the apron in the breeze.

== Theme ==
Images of peasant girls spinning wool were a popular subject and appeared frequently in the works of nineteenth century artists, to whom the theme offered opportunities to romanticize rural life, document regional costume, as well as conjure up the iconography of Clotho and the Fates or Moirai of classical mythology, who are primeval goddesses that spin, apportion and eventually cut the thread of life to determine human fate. Similar treatments of the subject are to be found in Jules Breton's La Fileuse (1872; Philbrook Museum of Art), the English neoclassicist painter John Waterhouse's Pompeiian Girl Spinning (1874; Private Collection) and Frederic Leighton's work Winding the Skein (1878; Art Gallery of New South Wales).

Vedder's treatment of the theme, without precedent in American art and an exceptionally early example of what would eventually become a popular nineteenth century subject, reflects through its study of sunlight and shadow effects the influence of Corot and the macchiaolo style of Italian landscape painter Giovanni 'Nino' Costa, whom Vedder had befriended and painted alongside since the late 1850s.

Oil study for Peasant Girl, spinning
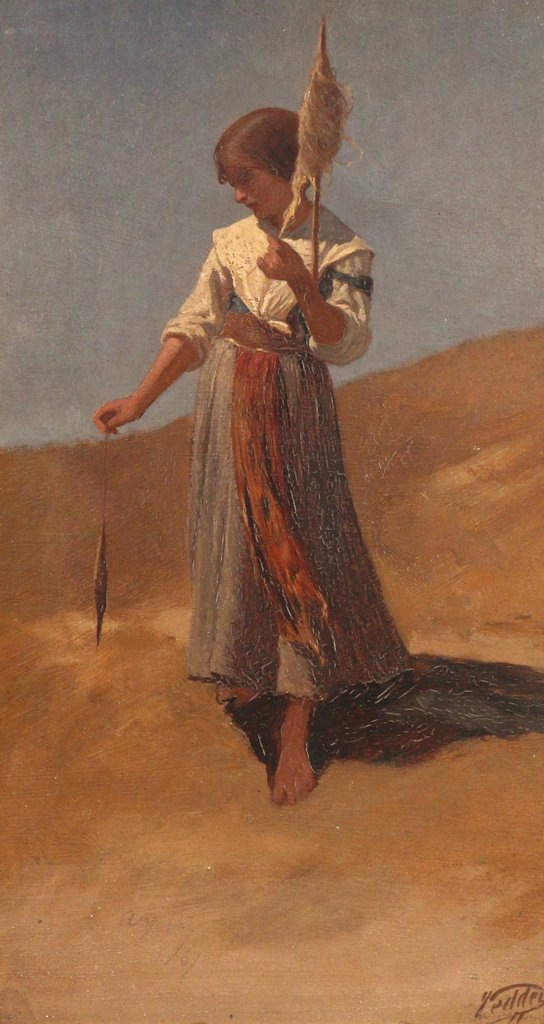
- Artist: Elihu Vedder
- Year: 1867
- Type: Oil on board, laid down on canvas
- Dimensions: 30.48 cm × 17.14 cm (12.00 in × 6.75 in)

An inscription appearing on the back of an oil study for this picture that is dated August 19, 1867 reveals Vedder first developed the subject in Peasant Girl, spinning at "Le Casacce, between Perugia and Gubbio, while the artist was in Tuscany that Summer.

Stylistically, Peasant Girl, spinning relates to a number of solitary vertical compositions among Vedder's early works, such as Girl with a Lute (1866; Private Collection), The Gloomy Path (1868; Private Collection), La Regina (1871; Reynolda House), and establishes a mode of depicting figures that would characterize later compositions like The Cup of Death (1885; Smithsonian Institutions) and Aladdin's Lamp (1888; Harvard Art Museums) as well.

Vedder would reprise and elaborate the theme of spinners in numerous later works such as Girl Spinning (1871; Questroyal Fine Art Galleries, New York), Spinning under the Olives (1879; McMullen Museum of Art, Boston College), as well as for an illustration of his celebrated edition of the Rubaiyat of Omar Khayyam in The Fates Gathering the Stars (1887; Art Institute of Chicago). Given its date of 1867, however, Peasant Girl, spinning appears to be the earliest and the original example of these.

== Reception and exhibition history ==
In his autobiography of 1910, The Digressions of V., Vedder listed this work as having been sold, along with Etruscan Girl with a Turtle (1867; Smith College Museum of Art), to New York publisher Jeremiah Curtis.

The painting was last publicly exhibited at the Los Angeles County Museum of Art in 1974.

== Gallery ==
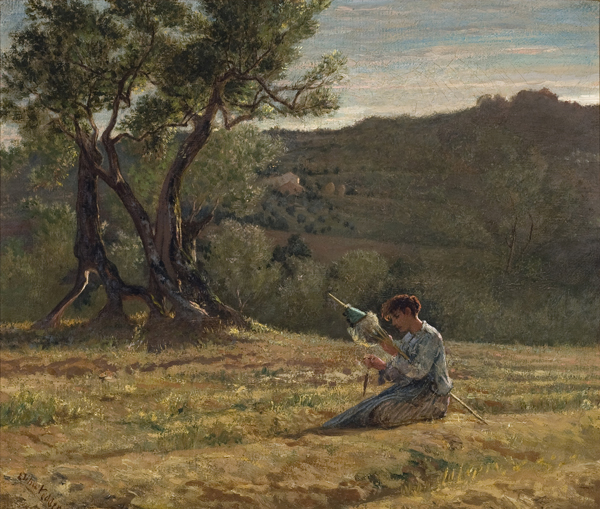
Spinning under the Olives, 1879; McMullen Museum of Art, Boston College

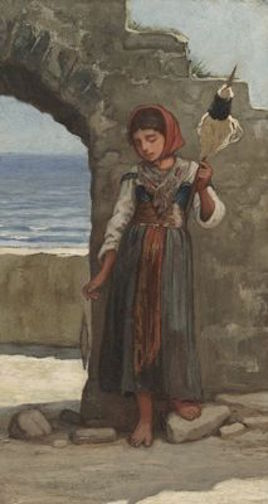
Spinning Girl, 1871; Questroyal Fine Art Galleries, New York.

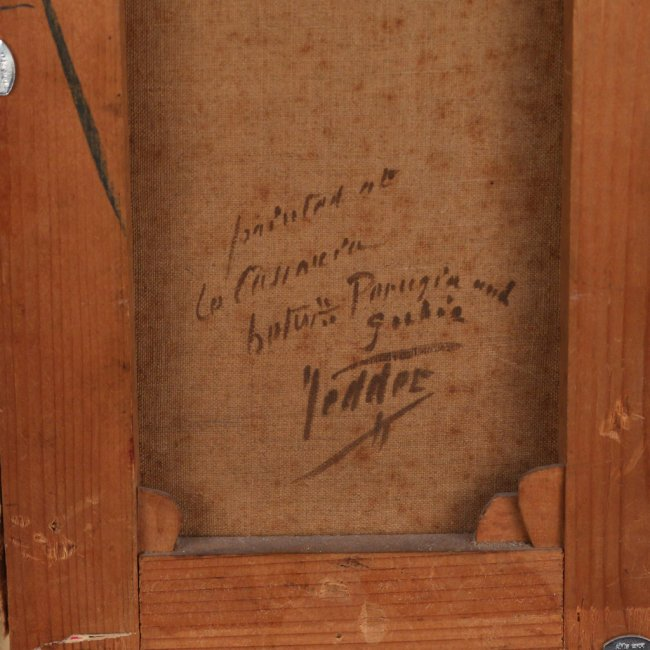
Verso of oil study for Peasant Girl, spinning
