= Giufà =

Character of Italian folklore

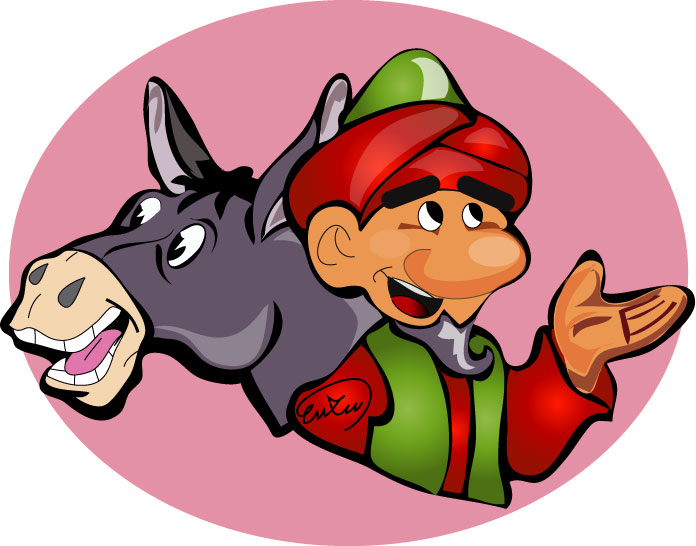
Juha with his donkey

Giufà, or Giucà as he is referred to in some areas, is a character of Sicilian folklore. His antics have been retold and memorized through centuries of oral tradition. Although the anecdotes from his life mainly revolve around the southern Italian and Sicilian lifestyle, his character traits are visible in the folk characters of many Mediterranean cultures. In fact, scholars suggest that the character Giufà developed from stories of Nasrudin, a Turkish folk character. It is believed that during Islamic rule of the island of Sicily, stories of this man – known in Arabic as Juha (جحا, Juḥā) – were absorbed into the Sicilian oral tradition, transformed to exemplify cultural norms and eventually transmitted throughout southern Italy. Although Giufà is most often recognized as the "village fool", his actions and words usually serve to provide a moral message. It is his peers' reactions, rather than Giufà's outrageous behavior, that are judged at the end of each story.

== Literature ==
Giufà is one of the names given to Gurdulù, the character of "village idiot" and squire of the knight Agilulfo in Italo Calvino's novel The Nonexistent Knight, set in Carolingian France. Giufà is also the protagonist of Leonardo Sciascia's tale of the same name in the short-story collection The Wine-Dark Sea. In this story, Giufà goes hunting. Mistaking a cardinal's hair for a redcrest, he shoots him. After killing him, he takes the body to his mother to cook it. After his mother's scolding, Giufà throws the cardinal's body into his well. The local cops start looking for the cardinal and smell the stench in the well. Since none of them want to go down into the well, Giufà offers to go down himself. Once down, instead of tying his rope to the cardinal's body, the confused Giufà ties it to a ram that he had also thrown into the well.
