= The Young Widow =

La Fontaine's fable

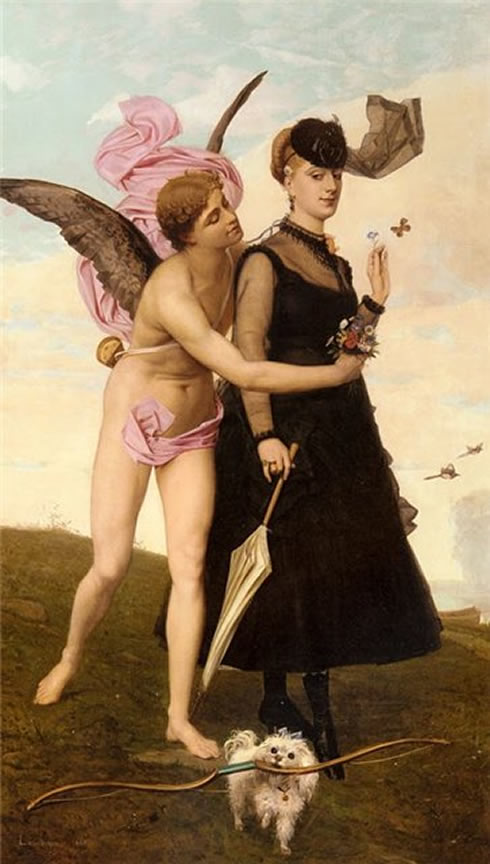
Lambron Des Piltières' painting of La Jeune Veuve, 1869

The Young Widow is a fable of Italian origin, made famous by being included in La Fontaine's Fables (VI.21). Originally a cynical attack on female inconstancy, later treatments were more thoughtful.

== The Fable ==
The fable originally appeared in Laurentius Abstemius' collection of humorous fables, the Hecatomythium (1492).

There was a woman, still young, whose husband was dying, and her father consoled her, saying, "Don't get so upset, daughter, for I have found you another man, more handsome than that one by far, who will easily soften your longing for your former husband." But the woman, chafing at her grief, like someone pursuing her husband out of burning love, not only refused to listen to her father's words but even denounced him for the untimely mention of another husband. But when she saw that her husband was deceased, amidst the tears and grieving, she asked her father whether that young man was there, whom he had said he wanted her to marry.

Soon afterwards a close translation appeared in the English jest book Merry Tales and Quick Answers (c.1530), but in general the trend among later fabulists has been to embroider upon the rather threadbare narration of Abstemius. La Fontaine softens the sarcasm by making the change of attitude less immediate in his treatment of the story while Charles Denis in his 1754 translation of La Fontaine lengthens the period further and explains the change as simply the effect of time.

La Fontaine's delicately ironical interpretation of the fable is reflected in later artistic treatments, such as Lambron Des Piltières' odd mixture of the Classical and the contemporary in La Jeune Veuve. But Ambrose Bierce brings a blacker humour to his Fantastic Fables, where the story is subverted under the title "The Inconsolable Widow". This tells of a passer-by attempting to comfort a woman weeping beside a grave with the assurance that 'there is another man somewhere, besides your husband, with whom you can still be happy'. The woman answers that she agrees, and that this is where he is buried.

Marc Chagall included an etching of the grieving widow among the set of illustrated fables he published in 1952. In 1995 Ida Gotkovsky (1933-) included it in her Hommage à Jean de La Fontaine for children's choir and orchestra; in 1999 Isabelle Aboulker set the fable for high voice and piano as the first of her four Femmes en fables.
