= The Astrologer who Fell into a Well =

Fable by Aesop

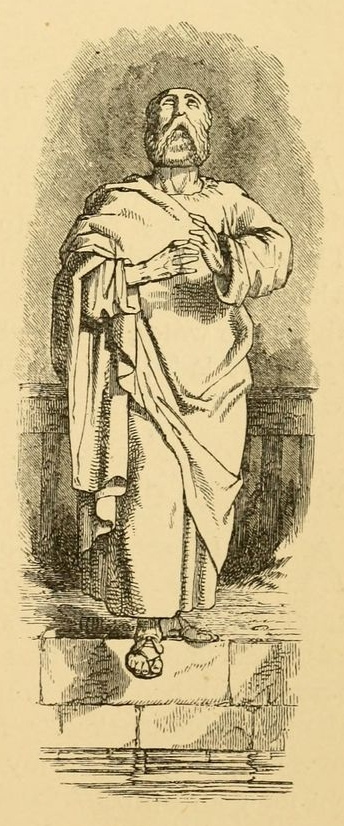
John Tenniel's illustration from the 1884 edition of Aesop's Fables.

"The Astrologer who Fell into a Well" is a fable about the pre-Socratic philosopher Thales of Miletus. It was one of several stories from Ancient Greece that were incorporated into Aesop's Fables and subsequently included in the Perry Index at number 40. During the scientific attack on astrology in the 16th–17th centuries, the story again became very popular.

== The fable and its interpretation ==
The story of Thales falling into a well while gazing at the stars was originally recorded in Plato's Theaetetus (4th century BCE). Other ancient tellings sometimes vary the person or the rescuer but regularly retain the rescuer's scoffing remark that it would be better to keep one's mind on the earth. The Roman poet Ennius summed up the lesson to be learned from the story in the line Quod est ante pedes nemo spectat, caeli scrutantur plagas ("No one regards what is before his feet when searching out the regions of the sky") and was twice quoted by Cicero to this effect.

Thomas Aquinas (d. 1274) reports the story as follows in his commentary on the Nicomachean Ethics:

When Thales was leaving his house to look at the stars he fell into a ditch; while he was bewailing the fact an old woman remarked to him: "You, O Thales, cannot see what is at your feet and you expect to see what is in the heavens?"

The anecdote was repeated as an amusing story in the English jest book Merry Tales and Quick Answers (1530). In this the philosopher

fell plumpe into a ditche over the eares. Wherefore an olde woman that he kepte in his house laughed and sayde to him in derision: O Thales, how shuldest thou have knowlege in hevenly thinges above, and knowest nat what is here benethe under thy feet?

Meanwhile, Andrea Alciato was mounting a more serious attack on astrology in his Book of Emblems, the first of many editions of which appeared in 1531. In that first edition there was an illustration of the astrologer, head in air, about to trip over a block on the ground. The accompanying Latin poem referred to the story of Icarus and later editions used instead an illustration of his fall from the sky. However, the emblem is titled "Against Astrologers" and the poem concludes with the warning 'Let the astrologer beware of predicting anything. For the imposter will fall headlong, so long as he flies above the stars.' The English emblem compiler Geoffrey Whitney followed Alciato's lead in including the story and an equally fierce attack in his Choice of Emblemes (1586). At much the same time, John Lyly's play, Gallathea (first performed in 1588) features a sub-plot involving a phony alchemist and a sham astronomer who, in gazing up at the stars, falls backward into a pond.

The Neo-Latin poet Gabriele Faerno also included the story of the stumbling astrologer in his collection Centum Fabulae (1554), but concluded with the more philosophical point, 'How can you understand the world without knowing yourself first?' As with several others, it was from this source that Jean de la Fontaine included the plot among his Fables (II.13). His poem is remarkable in confining the story to a mere four-line allusion before launching into a 45-line denunciation of astrology (with a side-swipe at alchemy too). But the battle against superstition had been won by the time that Charles Denis included a mere digest of La Fontaine's poem in his Select Fables (1754). His conclusion is that speculation about the future is idle; how many folk, he asks,

Let, for want of due repair,
A real house fall down,
To build a castle in the air?

Samuel Croxall is even more curt in his Fables of Aesop (1732). The moral of the tale, he concludes, is "mind your own business".
