= Jest book =

Jest books (or joke books) are collections of jokes and humorous anecdotes in book form – a literary genre which reached its greatest importance in the early modern period.

== Origins ==
The oldest surviving collection of jokes is the Byzantine Philogelos from the first millennium. In Western Europe, the medieval fabliau and the Arab/Italian novella built up a large body of humorous tales; but it was only with the Facetiae of Poggio (1451) that the anecdote first appears rendered down into joke form (with prominent punchline) in an early modern collection.

Like his immediate successors Heinrich Bebel and Girolamo Morlini, Poggio translated his folk material from their original language into Latin, the universal European language of the time. From such universal collections, developed the particular vernacular jestbooks of the various European countries in the sixteenth century.

== Elizabethan jestbooks ==
Tudor and Stuart jest books were typically anonymous collections of individual jests in English, a mix of verse and prose perhaps more comparable to the latter-day magazine than to a normal book. Some, however (following a German model), did attempt to link their jokes into a picaresque sort of narrative around one, often roguish hero, as with Richard Tarlton. Jest books took a generally mocking tone, with civility, and social superiors like the 'stupid scholar' as favourite targets.

The low-life, realistic tone of the jest book, akin to coney-catching pamphlets, fed into the early English novels (or at least prose fiction) of writers like Thomas Nashe and Thomas Deloney. Jestbooks also contributed to popular stage entertainment, through such dramatists as Marlowe and Shakespeare. Playbooks and jestbooks were treated as forms of light entertainment, with jokes from the one being recycled in the other, and vice versa.

Advances in printing meant that quantitatively jestbooks reached their greatest circulation in the 17th and 18th centuries; but qualitatively their contents was increasingly either a repetition of earlier publications or an artificial imitation of what had in the Elizabethan jest book been a genuine folk content. Bowdlerisation in the 19th century completed the fall of the English-language jest book from Elizabethan vitality to subsequent triviality.

== Parallel traditions ==
- French jestbooks were widely drawn on in the work of Rabelais. Arguably at least, the French jestbook tradition survived unbowdlerised into the twentieth century.
- Germany had a rich tradition of jestbooks, with Till Eulenspiegel as a prominent character.
- The first American jest book was published in 1787, and thereafter the genre flourished for some half a century, before giving way to the twin influence of censorship and the rise of the comic almanac.

== See also ==
- Robert Armin
- Salcia Landmann
- Shakespeare's Jest Book
