= Shakespeare's Jest Book =

The title of Shakespeare's Jest Book has been given to two quite different early Tudor period collections of humorous anecdotes, published within a few years of each other. The first was The Hundred Merry Tales, the only surviving complete edition of which was published in 1526. The other, published about 1530, was titled Merry Tales and Quick Answers and originally contained 113 stories. An augmented edition of 1564 contained 140.

The explanation of the title comes from a reference to one or other collection in William Shakespeare's play Much Ado About Nothing in which the character Beatrice has been accused 'that I had my good wit out of the 100 Merry Tales' (II.sc.1). By that time it seems that the two works were being confounded with each other.

== Contents ==
The stories in the 1526 Hundred Merry Tales are largely set in England, mostly in London or the surrounding area, and contain the stock figures of stupid clergymen, unfaithful wives, and Welshmen, the butt of many jokes at the time. Most are followed by a comment on what can be learned from the story. The book's Victorian editors identified a few Italian and French sources from earlier centuries but it was mainly a depository for popular lore that was to figure in more focussed collections published later. In particular, one story there (Of the thre wyse men of Gotam, 24) features the proverbial villagers of Gotham. Another (Of mayster Skelton that broughte the bysshop of Norwiche ii fesauntys, 40) concerns the raffish priest and poet John Skelton, of whom many more stories were to be told in the Merie Tales of Skelton (1566).

Merry Tales and Quick Answers has a wider and more literary range of reference. Among its contents are to be found two of Aesop's Fables dealing with human subjects, Of Thales the astronomer that fell in a ditch (25) and 'Of the olde woman that had sore eies (89), and two popular tales that were credited to Aesop in later collections: Of hym that sought his wyfe, that was drowned agaynst the streme (55) and Of the olde man and his sonne that brought his asse to the towne to sylle (59). Three of these and yet one more, Of the yonge woman, that sorowed so greatly the deathe of her husbande (10), were to figure later among La Fontaine's Fables. The story of the young widow is a close translation of a fable that had appeared in the Latin collection of Laurentius Abstemius only three decades earlier.

The anecdotes recorded in the work range from Classical history to near contemporary times across the cities of Europe. One scholar comments that the work is 'mostly drawn from Erasmus and Poggio Bracciolini, but acknowledges little of its inheritance beyond ascribing a handful of its jests to Plutarch'. It certainly owes to Poggio a good deal of its scabrous and scatological content. The following is a list of the principal stories that are common to the English jest book and Poggio's Facetiae.

- 1. Of hym that rode out of London, and had his seruaunt folowynge hym on foote – Poggio tale 162
- 4. Of the curate that sayde our lorde fedde fyue hundred persones _ Poggio's 227
- 6. Of the men of the countrey, that came to London to bye a crucifixe – Poggio 12 (Hurwood)
- 18. Of the iolus man (later known as "The ring of Hans Carvel") – Poggio's 133
- 28. Of him that dreamed he founde golde – Poggio's 130
- 31. Of the fryer that brayed in his sermon – Poggio's 230
- 36. Of the marchant that made a wager with his lorde – Poggio's 184
- 39. Of him that wolde confesse him by a lybell in wrytynge – Poggio's 176
- 57. Of hym that wolde gyue a songe to the tauerner for his dyner – Poggio's 259
- 66. Of the woman that couered her heed, and shewed up her tayle – Poggio's 137
- 73. Of the yong man of Brugis and his spouse, which takes place in Florence in Poggio's 147
- 76. Of the wydowe that wolde not wedde for bodily pleasure – Poggio 219
- 87. Of Dantes answere to the iester – Poggio 56 (Hurwood)
- 90. Of hym that had the custody of a warde – Poggio's 194
- 98. Of the doctour that desyred to go with a fouler to catche byrdes – Poggio's 179
- 99. Of hym that undertoke to teache an asse to spelle and rede – Poggio's 250
