= Liber de similitudinibus et exemplis =

Liber de similitudinibus et exemplis (also known as Tabula exemplorum) is a 13th-century Latin collection of moral tales and proverbial wisdom, arranged in alphabetical order of topics, beginning with accidia (laziness) and ending with Xristi ascensio (the ascension of Christ).

The collection was written in France in the last three decades of the thirteenth century. Its contents indicate that it was composed by a mendicant and that he was probably a Franciscan.

== Bibliography ==
- J. Th. Welter, La Tabula exemplorum secundum ordinem alphabeti: recueil d'exempla compile en France a la fin du XIIIe siecle. Paris, 1926. [Selections in Latin]
- Lynn Thorndike, "Liber de similitudinibus et exemplis (MS. Berne 293, fols 1r-75v)" in Speculum vol. 32 (1957) pp. 780–791.
- Nicolas Louis, 'L’exemplum en pratiques: Production, diffusion et usages des recueils d’exempla latins aux XIIIe-XVe siècles TOME 2 : ANNEXE', PhD Thesis (Université de Namur, 2013), pp. 196–200.
