= Hairspray (2007 soundtrack) =

Hairspray: Soundtrack to the Motion Picture

Soundtrack album by Various artists/John Travolta
- Released: July 10, 2007
- Recorded: September 2006 – January 2007
- Genres: Pop, rock and roll
- Length: 66:05
- Label: New Line
- Producers: Marc Shaiman, Lucian Piane, Paul Broucek, Jason Lynn

Hairspray: Soundtrack to the Motion Picture is the soundtrack album for the 2007 New Line Cinema musical film Hairspray. The film is an adaptation of the 2002 Broadway musical of the same name, itself adapted from John Waters's original 1988 film. It features performances from the film's cast, which includes John Travolta, Michelle Pfeiffer, Christopher Walken, Amanda Bynes, James Marsden, Queen Latifah, Brittany Snow, Zac Efron, Elijah Kelley, and Nikki Blonsky as the lead character of Tracy Turnblad.

The album has sold upwards of 1,200,000 copies in the US, and has been certified Platinum by the RIAA.

== Critical reception ==
Professional ratings
Review scores
Source	Rating
Allmusic	4/5 stars
The News & Observer	3/5 stars

The soundtrack received positive reviews from critics.

== Album information ==
The soundtrack contains nineteen songs from the film written by Marc Shaiman and Scott Wittman, three of which were not included in the stage musical version. Shaiman, who produced the original cast album for the Broadway musical, produced the songs for the film musical as well. Hairspray's music is written and performed to conform to the story's 1962 setting, with influences spanning the genres of rock and roll, soul, and pop.

"Ladies' Choice", a new song performed by Zac Efron, was the Hairspray soundtrack's first single. iTunes released the single on May 15, 2007. The iTunes version of the album includes bonus features such as the bonus track "I Can Wait" (a song written for the film but cut), the "Ladies' Choice" music video, an instructional dance video for "Ladies' Choice", and a digital version of the album booklet. The soundtrack debuted on the Billboard 200 at number 20 and peaked at number two.

"The New Girl in Town", "Big, Blonde and Beautiful (Reprise)", and "Come So Far (Got So Far to Go)" are the three songs new to this version of Hairspray, although "The New Girl in Town" was originally written for but dropped from the Broadway production. "Come So Far (Got So Far to Go)" is played over the film's end credits, as are renditions of two songs from the stage musical which were not included in the film proper: "Cooties" and "Mama, I'm a Big Girl Now". "Cooties" is performed on the soundtrack in a contemporary pop style by singer Aimee Allen. It was also played (without vocals) during the Miss Teenage Hairspray pageant. "Mama, I'm a Big Girl Now", is performed by each of the three women most famous portraying Hairspray's main character, Tracy Turnblad: the 1988 film's Ricki Lake, the Broadway production's Marissa Jaret Winokur, and this film's Nikki Blonsky. Harvey Fierstein, who played Edna in the original Broadway production, also has a vocal cameo at the end of the track.

Several of the songs from the Broadway musical had their lyrics altered and/or verses removed for use in the film version. These songs include "(The Legend of) Miss Baltimore Crabs", "Welcome to the 60s", "Big, Blonde and Beautiful", "Without Love", "(It's) Hairspray", "You Can't Stop the Beat", et cetera.

In 2016, a vinyl edition of the album was released and sold at numerous retailers to coincide with the release of Hairspray Live!.

== Track listing ==
All tracks are written by Marc Shaiman and Scott Wittman.

No.	Title	Performer(s)	Length
1.	"Good Morning Baltimore"	Nikki Blonsky	3:54
2.	"The Nicest Kids in Town"	James Marsden with the Council Members	2:42
3.	"It Takes Two"	Zac Efron	3:04
4.	"(The Legend of) Miss Baltimore Crabs"	Michelle Pfeiffer with the Council Members	4:08
5.	"I Can Hear the Bells"	Nikki Blonsky (All Vocals)	4:14
6.	"Ladies' Choice"	Zac Efron	2:28
7.	"The New Girl in Town"	Brittany Snow, Sarah Jayne Jensen, Hayley Podschun and The Dynamites	2:16
8.	"Welcome to the 60's"	Blonsky, John Travolta, The Dynamites with Jerry Stiller	5:13
9.	"Run and Tell That"	Elijah Kelley, Taylor Parks	3:51
10.	"Big, Blonde and Beautiful"	Queen Latifah with The Negro Day Kids	2:35
11.	"Big, Blonde and Beautiful (Reprise)"	John Travolta, Michelle Pfeiffer	1:06
12.	"(You're) Timeless to Me"	John Travolta, Christopher Walken	4:47
13.	"I Know Where I've Been"	Latifah with Black cast, Blonsky and Kelley	4:13
14.	"Without Love"	Efron, Blonsky, Kelley, Amanda Bynes with Negro Day Kids	3:40
15.	"(It's) Hairspray"	Marsden with Council Members	2:20
16.	"You Can't Stop the Beat"	Blonsky, Efron, Bynes, Kelley, Travolta and Latifah with Walken, Marsden, Snow, Pfeiffer	5:25
17.	"Come So Far (Got So Far to Go)"	Latifah, Blonsky, Efron, Kelley	4:17
18.	"Cooties"	Aimee Allen	2:42
19.	"Mama, I'm a Big Girl Now"	Ricki Lake, Marissa Jaret Winokur, Nikki Blonsky with Harvey Fierstein	3:19

== 2-disc Collector's edition ==
A limited edition two-disc version of the Hairspray soundtrack was released on November 20, 2007, the same day as the film's DVD/Blu-ray release. The 2-disc Collector's edition soundtrack includes the one-disc soundtrack, as well as a second disc featuring additional songs from the film, deleted songs (among them "I Can Wait"), demo recordings, and karaoke versions of certain songs. The album debuted at number 90 on the Billboard 200 with sales of at least 20,000 copies sold.

Collector's edition: Disc 2
No.	Title	Performer(s)	Length
1.	"I Can Wait" (Deleted number that was shot, but was cut from the film)	Blonsky	3:44
2.	"Breakout" (Used in film as a record)	Chester Gregory	3:03
3.	"Boink-Boink" (Used in film as a record)	Arthur Adams	2:04
4.	"Trouble on the Line" (Used in film as a record)	Corey Reynolds	2:02
5.	"Mr. Pinky’s Theme" (Instrumental score)	Instrumental	0:33
6.	"Mrs. Von Tussle Says" (Demo for a potential replacement for "(The Legend of) Miss Baltimore Crabs")	Pattie Darcy, Marc Shaiman	2:24
7.	"Save Your Applause 'Til the End" (Demo for a potential replacement for "(The Legend of) Miss Baltimore Crabs")	Christine Ebersole	2:55
8.	"Turn Back the Hands of Time" (Demo for an end-credits song)	Jenifer Lewis	3:02
9.	"Timeless to Me" (Original demo recorded during development of the Broadway show)	Nathan Lane	4:03
10.	"It Ain't Over 'Til the Fat Lady Sings" (Original demo for an unused song)	Keala Settle	3:19
11.	"It Doesn't Get Better Than This" (Original demo for an unused song)	Marc Shaiman	3:05
12.	"Ladies' Choice" (Karaoke instrumental version)	Karaoke instrumental	2:29
13.	"Welcome to the 60's" (Karaoke instrumental version)	Karaoke instrumental	5:01
14.	"Run and Tell That" (Karaoke instrumental version)	Karaoke instrumental	3:41
15.	"You Can't Stop the Beat" (Karaoke instrumental version)	Karaoke instrumental	5:25
16.	"Come So Far (Got So Far to Go)" (Karaoke instrumental version)	Karaoke instrumental	4:20

=== Additional songs ===
Although included in the movie, "The Nicest Kids in Town (Reprise)" (performed by James Marsden and the Council Members) and "Tied Up in the Knots of Sin" (performed by composer Marc Shaiman and director Adam Shankman) were not included on the motion picture soundtrack.

== Vocalists ==
=== Main vocalists ===
- Nikki Blonsky as Tracy Turnblad (also additional voices on 4, 9)
- James Marsden as Corny Collins
- Zac Efron as Link Larkin (also additional voices on 4)
- Michelle Pfeiffer as Velma Von Tussle
- Brittany Snow as Amber Von Tussle (also additional voices on 4)
- John Travolta as Edna Turnblad
- Elijah Kelley as Seaweed J. Stubbs
- Queen Latifah as Motormouth Maybelle
- Christopher Walken as Wilbur Turnblad
- Amanda Bynes as Penny Pingleton (also additional voices on 4)
- Hayley Podschun as Tammy (also additional voices on 4)
- Sarah Jayne Jensen as Shelley

=== Cameo vocalists ===
- Jerry Stiller as Mr. Pinky
- Taylor Parks as Little Inez (also additional voices on 4)
- Harvey Fierstein

=== The Dynamites ===
- Shayna Steele
- Kamilah Marshall
- Terita R. Redd

=== Background vocals ===
- Bobbi Page - vocal ensemble, also vocal contractor
- John West - vocal ensemble, also vocal contractor
- Don Taylor - choir director
- New Dimensions - gospel choir vocals
- L.A. Mass Choir - gospel choir vocals

Vocal ensemble members: Marc Shaiman, Shoshana Bean, Terron Brooks, Jenn Gambatese, Chester Gregory, Leslie Kritzer, Arnold McCuller, Louis Price, Sabrina Sloan, Donna Vivino, Willis White, Lucien Piane, Chyla Anderson, Jonathan Byram, Keith Cotton, Michael Cunio, Carmel Echols, Cliff Frazier, Christopher Johnson, Katharine Leonard, Laura Lively, Michael Mayo, Sophia Pizzulo, Jamison Scott Robinson, Jessica Rotter, Candice Rumph Burrows, Peter Mathew Smith, Leonard Sullivan, Matt Sullivan, Clarke Thorell, Davia Walker, Ayana Williams, Frank Wolf

== Instrumentalists ==
=== Featured Rhythm Musicians ===
- Marc Shaiman – keyboards
- Peter Calo – guitar
- Francisco Centeno – bass
- Keith Cotton – keyboards
- James “Jim” Cox – keyboards
- George Doering – guitar
- Nathan East – bass
- Mike Fisher – guitar
- Clint de Ganon – drums, percussion
- Rick Gratton – drums
- Paul Jackson Jr. – guitar
- Dean Parks – guitar
- John Robinson – drums
- Larry Saltzman – guitar
- Steve Schaeffer – percussion
- David Spinozza – guitar
- Neil Stubenhaus – bass
- Michael Thompson – guitar
- Michael Valerio – bass

=== Featured Horn Section ===
- Saxophones: Dan Higgins (Main), Larry Williams, Joel Peskin & Bill Liston
- Trumpets: Jerry Hey (Main), Wayne Bergeron, Gary Grant, Larry Hall & Warren Luening
- Trombones: Charlie Loper (Main), Steve Holtman, Alex Iles & Bill Reichenbach

=== Hollywood Studio Symphony ===
- Violins: Ralph Morrison, Julie Ann Gigante & 26 others
- Viola: Pamela Goldsmith & 11 others
- Cello: Antony Cooke & 10 others
- Double Bass: Nico Abondolo & 8 others
- Bassoon (1st): Rose Corrigan
- Additional Bassoon: Allen M. Savedoff
- Clarinets: James Kanter & 4 others
- Flute (1st): Louise Dillon
- Additional Flutes: Geraldine Rotella & Greg Huckins
- Oboe (1st): Thomas Boyd
- Additional Oboe: Phillip Ayling
- Percussion: Alan Estes & 9 others
- Additional Trumpets: Daniel Fornero & Jon Lewis
- Additional Trombones: Andrew Martin & Craig Gosnell
- Additional Horns: James Thatcher

== Chart performance and awards ==
Chart (2007)	Peak position
Australian ARIA Albums Chart	5
Austrian Albums (Ö3 Austria)	71
Belgian Albums (Ultratop Flanders)	48
Canadian Albums (Billboard)	2
Dutch Albums (Album Top 100)	61
France Albums Top 150	34
New Zealand Albums (RMNZ)	7
Spanish Albums (Promusicae)	62
Swiss Albums (Schweizer Hitparade)	46
U.S. Billboard 200	2
U.S. Billboard Top Independent Albums	1

Wins

- Billboard Year End Charts (2007)
  - Number 1 Top Independent Album of the Year - "Hairspray"

Nominations

- 2008 Grammy Awards
  - Best Compilation Soundtrack Album for Motion Picture, Television or Other Visual Media

== Certifications ==
Sales certifications for Hairspray
Region	Certification	Certified units/sales
Australia (ARIA)	Platinum	70,000^{^}
Canada (Music Canada)	Platinum	100,000^{^}
New Zealand (RMNZ)	Gold	7,500^{^}
United Kingdom (BPI)	Gold	100,000^{*}
United States (RIAA)	Platinum	1,000,000^{^}
^{*} Sales figures based on certification alone.^{^} Shipments figures based on certification alone.

== See also ==
- Hairspray (2007 film)
- Hairspray: Original Motion Picture Soundtrack
- Hairspray: Original Broadway Cast Recording
