= Hairspray (2002 album) =

Hairspray: Original Broadway Cast Recording

Cast recording by Cast of Hairspray
- Released: August 13, 2002
- Recorded: June 29–July 1, 2002
- Genre: Showtune, pop, soul, R&B
- Length: 59:45
- Label: Sony Classical
- Producers: Marc Shaiman; Thomas Meehan

Professional ratings
Review scores
Source	Rating
AllMusic	4.5/5 stars

Hairspray: Original Broadway Cast Recording is the cast album for the 2002 musical Hairspray. The show is an adaptation of the 1988 film of the same name. It features performances from the show's cast, which includes Harvey Fierstein, Linda Hart, Dick Latessa, Kerry Butler, Clarke Thorell, Mary Bond Davis, Laura Bell Bundy, Matthew Morrison, Corey Reynolds, and Marissa Jaret Winokur as the lead character of Tracy Turnblad. The cast recording earned the 2003 Grammy Award for Best Musical Theater Album.

== Album information ==
The cast recording contains seventeen songs from the musical, with music by Marc Shaiman and lyrics by Scott Wittman. The book for the musical is by Thomas Meehan and Mark O'Donnell. Hairspray's music is written and performed to conform to the story's 1962 setting, with influences spanning the genres of doo-wop, rock and roll, soul, and pop.

Sony released the recording on August 13, 2002 (ASIN: B00006AALQ).

== Track listing ==
All tracks written by Marc Shaiman and Scott Wittman.

1. "Good Morning Baltimore" – Tracy and Company (3:41)
2. "The Nicest Kids in Town" – Corny and Council Members (2:37)
3. "Mama, I'm a Big Girl Now" – Edna, Tracy, Velma, Amber, Prudy, and Penny (3:18)
4. "I Can Hear the Bells" – Tracy and Company (4:05)
5. "(The Legend of) Miss Baltimore Crabs" – Velma and Council Members with Tracy, Penny, and Little Inez (2:53)
6. "It Takes Two" – Link, Tracy, and Men (3:06)
7. "Welcome to the 60's" – Tracy, Edna, The Dynamites, and Company (3:58)
8. "Run and Tell That!" – Seaweed, Little Inez, and Detention Kids (3:49)
9. "Big, Blonde and Beautiful" – Motormouth, Little Inez, Tracy, Edna, Wilbur, and Company (4:37)
10. "The Big Dollhouse" – Matron, Edna, Velma, Tracy, Amber, Penny, Motormouth, Little Inez, Female Ensemble (3:15)
11. "Good Morning Baltimore (Reprise)" – Tracy (1:34)
12. "(You're) Timeless to Me" – Wilbur and Edna (4:09)
13. "Without Love" – Link, Tracy, Seaweed, and Penny (4:27)
14. "I Know Where I've Been" – Motormouth and Company (4:02)
15. "(It's) Hairspray" – Corny and Council Members (2:12)
16. "Cooties" – Amber and Council Members (1:32)
17. "You Can't Stop the Beat" – Tracy, Link, Penny, Seaweed, Edna, Wilbur, Motormouth, Amber, Velma, and Company (5:07)
18. "Blood on the Pavement" – Amber, Link, Velma, and Council Members (0:32)*

*Cut song, but it is included as a hidden song, playing after "You Can't Stop the Beat''

=== Additional songs and score changes ===
Because the soundtrack was recorded before previews in New York had begun, several songs in the stage show now differ from the versions recorded for the album, most notably "(The Legend of) Miss Baltimore Crabs" and "Cooties".

A few musical numbers were excised from the cast album entirely, including "The Nicest Kids in Town (Reprise)," "Velma's Revenge," and "The Madison", though the last was included on the 2-Disc Collector's Soundtrack retitled "Boink-Boink".

== Personnel ==
=== Main vocalists ===
- Marissa Jaret Winokur as Tracy Turnblad
- Clarke Thorell as Corny Collins
- Laura Bell Bundy as Amber Von Tussle
- Kerry Butler as Penny Lou Pingleton
- Harvey Fierstein as Edna Turnblad
- Linda Hart as Velma Von Tussle
- Jackie Hoffman as Prudy Pingleton/Matron
- Matthew Morrison as Link Larkin
- Corey Reynolds as Seaweed J. Stubbs
- Danelle Eugenia Wilson as Little Inez
- Mary Bond Davis as Motormouth Maybelle
- Dick Latessa as Wilbur Turnblad
- Joel Vig as Mr. Pinky

=== The Dynamites ===
- Shayna Steele (Welcome to the 60's, I Know Where I've Been)
- Kamilah Martin (Welcome to the 60's)
- Judine Richárd (Welcome to the 60's)

=== Council Members ===
(The Nicest Kids in Town, (The Legend of) Miss Baltimore Crabs, (It's) Hairspray, You Can't Stop the Beat)

- Peter Matthew Smith as Brad
- Hollie Howard as Tammy
- John Hill as Fender
- Jennifer Gambatese as Brenda
- Adam Fleming as Sketch
- Shoshana Bean as Shelley
- Todd Michel Smith as I.Q.
- Katharine Leonard as Lou Ann

=== Record Shop Kids ===
(Run and Tell That, Big, Blonde, and Beautiful, I Know Where I've Been, You Can't Stop the Beat)

- Eric B. Anthony as Duane
- Eric Dysart as Gilbert
- Danielle Lee Greaves as Lorraine
- Rashad Naylor as Thad

=== Production ===
- Marc Shaiman: producer
- Thomas Meehan: producer
- Lon Hoyt: music director

== Charts ==
Chart (2002)	Peak position
US Billboard 200	131

Chart (2007)	Peak position
US Cast Albums	3

=== Year-end charts ===
Chart (2006)	Position
US Cast Albums	8

Chart (2007)	Position
US Cast Albums	6

Chart (2008)	Position
US Cast Albums	15

== See also ==
- Hairspray: Original Motion Picture Soundtrack (1988)
- Hairspray: Soundtrack to the Motion Picture (2007)
