= Hairspray =

Hairspray may refer to:

- Hair spray, a personal grooming product that keeps hair protected from humidity and wind
- Hairspray (1988 film), a film by John Waters
  - Hairspray (1988 soundtrack), the film's soundtrack album
  - Hairspray (musical), a stage musical based on the original film
    - Hairspray (2002 album), the musical's cast album
    - Hairspray Live!, a live television musical version of the stage musical
    - Hairspray (2007 film), a film based on the musical
      - Hairspray (2007 soundtrack), the film's soundtrack album
- Hairspray: The School Musical, a UK reality TV series
- Pucker!, a 1995 album by The Selecter released in the US as Hairspray
