= Hairspray Live! =

American television special aired in 2016

- Promotional poster
- Genre: Musical; Romantic comedy Live television
- Based on: Hairspray (film) by John Waters; Hairspray (musical) by Mark O'Donnell and Thomas Meehan
- Written by: Harvey Fierstein
- Directed by: Kenny Leon; Alex Rudzinski
- Presented by: Darren Criss
- Starring: Maddie Baillio; Harvey Fierstein; Kristin Chenoweth; Garrett Clayton; Ariana Grande; Jennifer Hudson; Dove Cameron; Ephraim Sykes; Derek Hough; Martin Short; Shahadi Wright Joseph
- Composers: Marc Shaiman; Scott Wittman
- Country of origin: United States
- Original language: English

Production
- Executive producers: Craig Zadan; Neil Meron
- Producers: Craig Zadan; Neil Meron; Richard Bakewell
- Production locations: Universal Studios Lot, Universal City, California
- Camera setup: Multi-camera
- Running time: 113 minutes (DVD)
- Production companies: New Line Cinema; Warner Bros. Television; Storyline Entertainment; Sony Pictures Television; Universal Television

Original release
- Network: NBC
- Release: December 7, 2016

Related
- The Wiz Live!; Jesus Christ Superstar Live in Concert

Hairspray Live! is an American television special that aired live on the American television network NBC on December 7, 2016. Produced by Craig Zadan and Neil Meron, and hosted by Darren Criss, it is a performance of a new adaptation of the 2002 Broadway musical Hairspray, which is based on the 1988 film of the same name. The special was produced by New Line Cinema, Warner Bros. Television, Storyline Entertainment, Sony Pictures Television and Universal Television.

== Premise ==
Hairspray Live! takes place in 1962 Baltimore. Teenager Tracy Turnblad's dream is to dance on The Corny Collins Show, a local TV program. When, against all odds, Tracy wins a role on the show, she becomes a celebrity overnight and meets a colorful array of characters, including Link, the resident dreamboat; Amber, the ambitious mean girl; Seaweed, an African-American boy she meets in detention; and his mother, Motormouth Maybelle, owner of a local record store. Tracy's mother is the indomitable Edna Turnblad, and she eventually encourages Tracy on her campaign to integrate the all-White Corny Collins Show.

== Cast and characters ==
Main

- Maddie Baillio as Tracy Turnblad
- Harvey Fierstein as Edna Turnblad
- Martin Short as Wilbur Turnblad
- Jennifer Hudson as "Motormouth" Maybelle Stubbs
- Garrett Clayton as Link Larkin
- Ariana Grande as Penny Pingleton
- Derek Hough as Corny Collins
- Kristin Chenoweth as Velma Von Tussle
- Dove Cameron as Amber Von Tussle
- Ephraim Sykes as Seaweed J. Stubbs
- Shahadi Wright Joseph as Inez Stubbs

Minor roles

- Andrea Martin as Prudy Pingleton
- Paul Vogt as Mr. Harriman F. Spritzer
- Billy Eichner as Rob Barker
- Sean Hayes as Mr. Pinky
- Rosie O'Donnell as The Gym Teacher

Council members

- Riley Costello as Brad
- Marissa Heart as Tammy
- Mason Trueblood as Fender
- Jacque Lewarne as Brenda
- Ricky Schroeder as Sketch
- Helene Britany as Shelley
- Sam Faulkner as I.Q.
- Kelli Erdmann as Lou Ann
- Katherine Roarty as Kooks
- Heather Tepe as Belle
- Tommy Martinez as Corey
- Karl Skyler Urban as Jon

The Dynamites

- Kamilah Marshall
- Judine Somerville
- Shayna Steele

Motormouth Kids

- Joshua Alexander as James
- Will B. Bell as Duane
- Joanna Jones as Genie Mae
- Tiana Okoye as Lorraine
- Amos Oliver III as Thad
- Re'sean Pates as Jackie
- Rhon Saunders as Gilbert

Various ensemble

- Zack Everhart, Annie Gratton, Thomasina Gross, Allie Meixner, Eliotte Nicole, Tyler Parks, Andrew Pirozzi, Joy Marie Thomas, Keenan Washington, and Jason Williams

Cameos

- Ricki Lake (Tracy Turnblad in the original 1988 film) and Marissa Jaret Winokur (original Tracy Turnblad on Broadway) as Mr. Pinky's Girls

== Personnel ==
Musicians

- Pete Anthony – conductor, keyboards
- Wade Culbreath – percussion
- Greg Howe – lead guitar
- George Doering – rhythm guitar
- Don Payne – electric bass
- Clint de Ganon – drums
- Jim Cox – piano, keyboards
- Jenny Scheming, Moses Holland – violins
- Keith Norman – viola
- Richard Schenker – cello
- Jerry Hey, Gary Grant – trumpets
- Bill Reichenbach Jr. – trombone
- Kim Hutchcroft, Larry Williams – saxophones, flutes
- Allie Feder, Baraka May, Jackie Seiden, Dorian Holley, Fred White, Arnold McCuller – backing vocals
- Dorian Holley – vocal coach

Dancers

- Thomasina Gross
- Andrew Pirozzi
- Allie Meixner
- Tyler Parks
- Keenan D. Washington
- Zack Everhart Jr.
- Annie Gratton
- Unissa Cruse Ferguson
- Joy Marie Thomas
- Drew Hoffman
- Eliotte Nicole

== Musical numbers ==
The musical numbers from the track list of the soundtrack.

All tracks are written by Marc Shaiman and Scott Wittman.

No.	Title	Performer(s)	Length
1.	"Good Morning Baltimore"	Maddie Baillio and Ensemble	3:44
2.	"The Nicest Kids in Town"	Derek Hough and Council Members	2:36
3.	"Mama, I'm a Big Girl Now"	Harvey Fierstein, Baillio, Andrea Martin, Ariana Grande, Kristin Chenoweth, Dove Cameron, and Ensemble	3:18
4.	"I Can Hear the Bells"	Baillio and Ensemble	4:09
5.	"(The Legend of) Miss Baltimore Crabs"	Chenoweth and Council Members	3:27
6.	"Ladies' Choice"	Hough	2:12
7.	"It Takes Two"	Garrett Clayton and Baillio	3:00
8.	"Velma's Revenge"	Chenoweth	1:17
9.	"Welcome to the 60's"	Baillio, Feirstein, The Dynamites, Sean Hayes, and Ensemble	4:11
10.	"Run and Tell That!"	Ephraim Sykes, Shahadi Wright Joseph, and Ensemble	3:32
11.	"Big, Blonde and Beautiful"	Jennifer Hudson and Ensemble	4:35
12.	"(You're) Timeless to Me"	Fierstein and Martin Short	4:20
13.	"Good Morning Baltimore (Reprise)"	Baillio	1:53
14.	"Without Love"	Baillio, Clayton, Grande, Sykes, and Ensemble	4:28
15.	"I Know Where I've Been"	Hudson	4:03
16.	"(It's) Hairspray"	Hough and Council Members	2:16
17.	"Cooties"	Cameron and Council Members	1:10
18.	"You Can't Stop the Beat"	Baillio, Clayton, Grande, Sykes, Fierstein, Short, Hudson, Chenoweth, Cameron, and Company	5:13
19.	"Come So Far (Got So Far to Go)"	Grande, Hudson, and Company	4:12
Total length:			1:03:36

== Production ==
=== Development ===
Hairspray Live! served as NBC's fourth entry in its series of made-for-TV musical telecasts, behind The Wiz Live!, Peter Pan Live!, and The Sound of Music Live!. As with its predecessors, it was executive produced by Craig Zadan and Neil Meron. The project was revealed by NBC's entertainment head Bob Greenblatt during a Television Critics Association press tour in January 2016. In response to early reports that NBC was considering a live version of The Music Man, West Side Story, or Rodgers and Hammerstein's Cinderella, Greenblatt stated that "people have been saying to me since The Wiz, 'Do this show, do that show.' I've heard obscure titles and famous titles. Not everything's going to be a big name to the whole audience. I don't think there's an infinite number of these that can be done. But we're still doing it." He explained that the production would not try to emulate the 2007 film (also produced by Zadan and Meron), but that he would have been thrilled if John Travolta reprised his role in it.

Kenny Leon returned in his role as director from The Wiz, and was joined by Alex Rudzinski—who co-directed Grease: Live for Fox. The musical was adapted for television by Harvey Fierstein from the original book by Mark O'Donnell and Thomas Meehan. Jerry Mitchell, the choreographer of the Broadway version of Hairspray, was also involved with the adaptation. In contrast to NBC's previous musicals, Hairspray Live! was produced from the Universal Studios backlot; Greenblatt explained that a "fair amount" of the show would be staged in outdoor settings, and thus "have a real exuberance in the open air." Additionally, live audiences were integrated into relevant scenes as extras on-stage, such as bystanders in Baltimore, and as the studio audience of The Corny Collins Show. Two numbers written for the 2007 film, "Ladies' Choice" and "Come So Far (Got So Far to Go)", were incorporated into the production. "The Big Dollhouse", from the Broadway show, was cut, while "The New Girl In Town", written for the stage show but cut and only used in the film, was not added. (An instrumental version of the song is, however, heard very briefly as a bit of background music.)

=== Casting ===
In addition to adapting the book, Fierstein reprised the role of Edna Turnblad from the Broadway musical; Greenblatt felt that his performance of Edna was "iconic", and that his involvement with Hairspray Live! made it "come full circle". NBC cast the lead role of Tracy Turnblad through an open call in New York City, hoping to repeat the "phenomenal discovery" of Shanice Williams for The Wiz Live!. The role went to college sophomore Maddie Baillio, as her first professional role. In November 2016, it was announced that Ricki Lake and Marissa Jaret Winokur (who portrayed Tracy Turnblad in the 1988 film and the Broadway version respectively) would make cameo appearances; Winokur and Lake appeared as employees of Mr. Pinky's boutique. Darren Criss served as an on-air host, hosting a half-hour Countdown to Hairspray Live! show on NBC with Kristin Chenoweth and Sean Hayes, as well as behind-the-scenes reports throughout the live broadcast.

=== Marketing ===
Oreo, Reddi-wip, and Toyota broadcast live, themed commercials during Hairspray Live!; Oreo's ad featured the character of Corny Collins, Reddi-wip's ad featured a milkman character (Evan Strand) backstage and performing a dance number, while Toyota's ad featured a vintage Toyota Corolla and a current model in celebration of the vehicle's 50th anniversary.

== Reception ==
=== Critical response ===
On Rotten Tomatoes, the special holds a 76% rating based on 25 reviews, with an average of 8.2/10. The site's consensus states: "Hairspray Live! shimmers with outstanding performances, an engaging story, and songs that let its stars shine." It has a score of 66 from 14 critics on Metacritic, indicating "generally favorable reviews".

Neil Genzlinger of The New York Times wrote: "NBC lassoed some talented performers with fine singing voices but sacrificed cohesion by cramming the evening with too much interstitial fluff.... Only Jennifer Hudson, who played Motormouth Maybelle, found the real strength of this Tony-winning musical, delivering a knockout rendition of 'I Know Where I've Been'..." He noted that Baillio "did pretty well, though no novice is going to compete with voices like those of Ms. Hudson and Kristin Chenoweth..."

Sonia Saraiya of Variety wrote that it "took a few musical numbers to settle into a rhythm. But once it did (the energy seemed to kick in with "Welcome to the '60s") the musical easily became the best NBC has attempted. It's hard to imagine better casting for the production. Jennifer Hudson stole the show... Ariana Grande, certifiable pop star, came away as the show's MVP, acting as both reliably overlook-able sidekick and, once the situation required it, showstopping diva. Harvey Fierstein was predictably great... Martin Short... found the right profile for himself as Wilbur."

Rebecca Bunch of The TV Ratings Guide called the production "a great experience through and through." She called he cast "top notch", and praised Grande and Hudson in particular. She also named "You Can't Stop the Beat" the best musical moment of the night and stated that "they really knocked it out of the park", stating that "NBC really put together something amazing here."

Caroline Siede of The A.V. Club wrote that "As a piece of social commentary, tonight's production of Hairspray Live! was just about flawless." She stated that Dove Cameron and Ephraim Sykes were "consistently fun to watch", Chenoweth and Hudson "were the biggest scene-stealers.", and Fierstein, Short, and Martin "were all wonderful as well." She rated the telecast a B+.

In his 2019 essay collection Mr. Know-It-All, John Waters called the special "OK—but the weakest" of Hairspray's various iterations, expressing reservations about some of the casting decisions, as well as lamenting that neither he nor any surviving cast members of The Buddy Deane Show, the real-life basis of The Corny Collins Show, were consulted for the production.

=== Viewership ===
Hairspray Live! was seen by 9.05 million viewers, with a ratings share of 2.3 in the 18–49 demographic, and a 5.9 overnight household rating. It was the most-viewed program of the night, with numbers on par with those of Peter Pan. An encore presentation, which aired on December 27, was seen by 2.5 million viewers.

=== Accolades ===
Award	Category	Nominated artist/work	Result	Ref.
Art Directors Guild Awards	Awards or Event Special	Derek McLane	Nominated	
Directors Guild of America Awards	Outstanding Directing – Miniseries or TV Film	Kenny Leon and Alex Rudzinski	Nominated	
Make-Up Artists and Hair Stylist Guild Awards	Television Mini-Series or Movie Made for Television - Best Period/Character Make-Up	Melanie Hughes and Judy Yonemoto	Nominated	
MTV Movie & TV Awards	Best Musical Moment	Jennifer Hudson for "You Can't Stop the Beat"	Nominated	
Primetime Emmy Awards	Outstanding Variety Special	Craig Zadan, Neil Meron, Alex Rudzinski, Javier Winnik, Kenny Leon, Robert Norris Catto	Nominated	
Primetime Emmy Awards	Outstanding Costumes for a Variety, Nonfiction, or Reality Programming	Mary Vogt, Carolyn Dessert-Lauterio	Nominated	
Primetime Emmy Awards	Outstanding Hairstyling for a Variety, Nonfiction or Reality Program	Miia Kovero, Terry Baliel, Roxane Griffin, Lawrence Davis, Jill Crosby, Joy Zapata	Won	
Primetime Emmy Awards	Outstanding Lighting Design/ Lighting Direction for a Variety Special	Allen Branton, Felix Peralta, Kevin Lawson, Darren Langer, Kirk J. Miller	Nominated	
Primetime Emmy Awards	Outstanding Makeup for a Variety, Nonfiction or Reality Program	Melanie Hughes-Weaver, Judy Yonemoto, Jill Cady, Julie Socash, Shutchai Tym Buacharern, Angela Moos	Nominated	
Primetime Emmy Awards	Outstanding Production Design for a Variety Special	Derek McLane, Joe Celli, Jason Howard	Won	
Primetime Emmy Awards	Outstanding Technical Direction and Camerawork for a Special	Charles Ciup, Billy Steinberg, Chris Hill, Bert Atkinson, Randy Gomez, Nathanial Havholm, Ron Lehman, Bettina Levesque, Dave Levisohn, Tore Livia, Mike Malone, Adam Margolis, Rob Palmer, Brian Reason, Damien Tuffereau, Andrew Waruszewski	Won	

== See also ==
- The Sound of Music Live! (2013), NBC
- Peter Pan Live! (2014), NBC
- The Wiz Live! (2015), NBC
- Grease: Live (2016), Fox
- A Christmas Story Live! (2017), Fox
- Jesus Christ Superstar Live in Concert (2018), NBC
- Rent: Live (2019), Fox
