= Without Love (Hairspray song) =

Song

from the album Hairspray
- Released: 2002
- Genre: Traditional pop
- Length: 4:27
- Label: Sony Classical
- Composer: Marc Shaiman
- Lyricists: Marc Shaiman; Scott Wittman
- Producers: Marc Shaiman; Thomas Meehan

Hairspray track listing
- 1. "Good Morning Baltimore"; 2. "The Nicest Kids in Town"; 3. "Mama, I'm a Big Girl Now"; 4. "I Can Hear the Bells"; 5. "(The Legend of) Miss Baltimore Crabs"; 6. "It Takes Two"; 7. "Welcome to the 60's" 8. "Run and Tell That!"; 9. "Big, Blonde and Beautiful"; 10. "The Big Dollhouse"; 11. "Good Morning Baltimore (Reprise)"; 12. "(You're) Timeless to Me"; 13. "Without Love"; 14. "I Know Where I've Been"; 15. "(It's) Hairspray"; 16. "Cooties"; 17. "You Can't Stop the Beat"; 18. "Blood on the Pavement"

"Without Love" is a song from the 2002 musical Hairspray. It is a quartet song performed by Tracy, Link, Penny, and Seaweed, and is inspired by the duets of Motown artists Marvin Gaye & Tammi Terrell.

== Synopsis ==
Taking place during the second act of the musical and the 2007 musical film, "Without Love" finds the four teenagers singing about how they have all broken down societal barriers in order to love one another, and the two boys free the girls from their entrapment, heading off to the Corny Collins Show TV studio. Link frees love interest and lead, Tracy Turnblad, from jail after unjustly being arrested for protesting against the exclusion of black performers from The Corny Collins Show, and Seaweed frees love interest Penny from her mother tying her to her bed to prevent her from escaping after learning she, a white girl, is dating Seaweed, a black boy, in the racially segregated Baltimore in the 1960's. While in the 2002 musical rendition of Hairspray, Link saves Tracy from jail, in the 2007 film rendition, Link reunites with Tracy after Penny helps her escape from being locked in Penny's mothers basement while hiding from the police.

Answers.com explains: "In this song, the male lead, Link, reveals his love to Tracy, and Tracy's white friend, Penny, expresses her love for a black teen named Seaweed. The couples must literally fight through physical barriers in order to get to each other and rejoin the protest."

== Analysis ==
Answers.com explains the lyrical prowess of the song:

The lyrics of this song proclaim through many creative analogies that without love, life is seriously lacking. Tracy says "Without love, life is like my mother on a diet" and Link says that it is "like rock and roll without a drummer." The couples swear their lifelong allegiance to each other because none of them ever want to be "without love."

== Critical reception ==
CinemaBlend writes in a movie review that "we’ve lost some of the original picture's romance to the PG rating, so songs like “Without Love” don’t work as well". The New York Times named the song has "one of the film’s musical high points", explaining that "the two young couples express their yearning with the help of some ingenious and amusing special effects". The Washington Post wrote, "Marc Shaiman's music is virtually wall-to-wall bliss, and some of the lyrics, written with Scott Wittman, particularly in the romantic quartet "Without Love", remain surprising and clever no matter how many times you've listened to them." RecordOnline deemed it an "affirmative anthem", while The Column named it an "energetic and comic number". The Daily Texan described it as "perhaps one of the musical’s most iconic songs".

== Certifications ==
Certifications for "Without Love"
Region	Certification	Certified units/sales
United Kingdom (BPI)	Silver	200,000^{‡}
^{‡} Sales+streaming figures based on certification alone.
