= Welcome to the 60's =

Song

from the album Hairspray
- Released: 2002
- Genre: Traditional pop
- Length: 3:58
- Label: Sony Classical
- Composer: Marc Shaiman
- Lyricists: Marc Shaiman; Scott Wittman
- Producers: Marc Shaiman; Thomas Meehan

Hairspray track listing
- 1. "Good Morning Baltimore"; 2. "The Nicest Kids in Town"; 3. "Mama, I'm a Big Girl Now"; 4. "I Can Hear the Bells"; 5. "(The Legend of) Miss Baltimore Crabs"; 6. "It Takes Two"; 7. "Welcome to the 60's" 8. "Run and Tell That!"; 9. "Big, Blonde and Beautiful"; 10. "The Big Dollhouse"; 11. "Good Morning Baltimore (Reprise)"; 12. "(You're) Timeless to Me"; 13. "Without Love"; 14. "I Know Where I've Been"; 15. "(It's) Hairspray"; 16. "Cooties"; 17. "You Can't Stop the Beat"; 18. "Blood on the Pavement"

"Welcome to the 60's" is a song from the 2002 musical Hairspray. it is performed by Tracy Turnblad, Edna Turnblad, Mr. Pinky, and a Greek chorus consisting of three African-American stylists called the Dynamites.

== Production ==
DVD Talk wrote and Wittman's songs come from specific lines of dialog, like "Welcome to the 60's" and "Big, Blonde and Beautiful," a nice way of simply expanding on what Waters' characters were already saying".

== Synopsis ==
Edna Turnblad is encouraged to go outside for the first time in a while, and she takes in the surroundings. It is a changing world where it is okay to be black or fat. Tracy says: "people who are different, their time is coming". In the process she cures her mother's agoraphobia, and gets a job as a spokesperson for Mr. Pinky. In the film, the song "features a Supremes-style trio stepping down from a billboard to rouse the willing kids".

== Analysis ==
The Column Awards wrote the song had "the sense of a woman who is recognizing her own power", and symbolised "Edna's coming out, so to speak". The site also suggested the song shows Tracy's "transformation". Stranded at the Drive-In: The 100 Best Teen Movies argues the song "becomes an embrace of everyone different, including the black, the freaky, the (by implication) gay . . . and the fat. the song and its staging insiststhat everyone has a chance to, literally, come out and be visible in this brave new world".

Hollywood Catwalk: Exploring Costume and Transformation in American Film interpreted the song in regard to Edna's transformation:

Repeatedly the metamorphosis moment is accompanied by the notion that one owes it to oneself to be the best one can, to reflect the inner true beauty in one's external form. [The song] seems at first to suggest the establishment of a new decade accompanies that of a new Edna. But then the familiar tropes of the 'true self' creep in: Edna's metamorphosis is not so much a change as a return to her previous self. Edna is presented as an agoraphobic....who now overcomes her anxieties with a change of hairdo and outfit.

== Critical reception ==
In Newsweekly described the song as "weighty", and wrote that Edna "undergoes a hefty makeover and simply steals the show." EDGEboston said "the coda to Welcome to the Sixties, is given a big, Dreamgirls-like finish". Theater Mirror suggested the song features "three gals...singing and strutting like the Supremes". UK Theatre dubbed The Dynamites a "mock Supremes trio". Reviewing the film, Dominica Life wrote "It took me a while to warm up to Hairspray. But, when Tracy, Edna and a host of others take to the streets in the great dance number, “Welcome to the 60’s,” I was hooked". Chicago Critic described it as "MoTown revisited". Ey Jacksonville described the song as a "crowd favorite, “Welcome to the 60’s, adding "this song will have you dancing in your seat!". Dayton Most Metro called it "flavorfully decade-inspired", and said it was fueled by "Motown essence". Ithaca.com described the number as "splendid", and Alpharetta said the song is "rousing". Playbill described it as a "tuneful and surprisingly touching duet".
