= Ladies' Choice (Hairspray song) =

"Ladies' Choice" is a song written for the 2007 film version of the Broadway musical Hairspray. It is performed by Link Larkin (played by Zac Efron), with music and lyrics by Marc Shaiman and Scott Wittman. In Hairspray Live!, the song is performed by Corny Collins (played by Derek Hough).

== Production ==
"Ladies' Choice" was added to replace "The Madison", a dance number carried over into the stage musical from the original non-musical 1988 Hairspray film.

Susan Wloszczyna of USA Today wrote Efron "lets loose with a lusty yelp during a solo number, 'Ladies' Choice', which finally showcases his inviting baritone in all its unadulterated glory."

== Synopsis ==
Link (Corny Collins in Hairspray Live!) performs the song at a record hop featuring the dancers from the local TV program The Corny Collins Show, where Tracy Turnblad's dance moves impress Link and Corny, who decides to put her on the show as a replacement for another dancer.

== Critical reception ==
Daniel J. Stasiewski of Blogcritics wrote "Fans of the Broadway musical (which I never saw) may be disappointed by the new songs "Ladies' Choice" with Zac Efron and "The New Girl in Town" with Brittany Snow. They aren't nearly as fun as the original Broadway songs". Frederic and Mary Ann Brussat of Spirituality & Practice described the song as "Elvis-like", Marc Shaim of Cinema Review also described it "Elvis-inspired", John Li of MovieXclusive.com called it "cheeky", and Felix Gonzalez Jr. of DVD Review described it as a "suggestive number".

== Charts ==
=== Weekly charts ===
Chart (2007)	Peak position
UK Singles (Official Charts)	96
