= Leanne Jones =

British actress

- Born: Leanne Jones; 21 March 1985 (age 41); Stoke on Trent, England
- Occupation: Actress
- Years active: 2006 – present
- Television: The Voice UK (2014); Silent Witness (2017)
- Spouse: Stephen Porter
- Children: 2 Sons (born 2013 & 2015)
- Parent: Chris Jones

Leanne Jones (born 21 March 1985) is a British actress best known for her role as Tracy Turnblad in the West End production of the musical Hairspray. In 2008, she won both the Laurence Olivier Award for Best Actress in a Musical and the Theatregoers' Choice Award for Best Actress in a Musical and the Critics Circle Award for Best Newcomer.

== Early life ==
Jones was born in Stoke on Trent and grew up in St Ives, Cambridgeshire, where she attended St Ivo School, before studying at the Mountview Academy of Theatre Arts in Wood Green, north London, graduating in 2006.

== Career ==
Theatre - Hairspray (Shaftesbury Theatre), Jack & The Beanstalk (Alhambra Theatre, Bradford), Hairspray (DUCTAC, Dubai) The Naked Truth (UK Tour), Tick Tick Boom (Union Theatre), You're a Good Man Charlie Brown (Tabard Theatre), Beauty & The Beast (Gordon Craig, Stevenage), Bedroom Farce (New Wolsey Theatre, Ipswich) The Sunny Side of The Street (The Jermyn Street Theatre), Saucy Jack & The Space Vixens (Leicester Square Theatre) and Molly Wobbly's Tit Factory (The Lyric Theatre Belfast & Edinburgh Fringe 2012 and in the West End in 2014), 'Bea Pig' in the original west end cast of Stiles and Drewe The Three Little Pigs (Palace Theatre), Jack & The Beanstalk (The Woodville).

Television & Film | Unforgotten 2018. Sarah Bradley 'Rumble' directed by Charlie Manton 2017. Silent Witness 2017.

== Awards and honours ==
Jones' performance as Tracy Turnblad in Hairspray won her a number of awards, including a Theatregoers' Choice Award for Best Actress in a Musical, the Critics Circle Award 2008 for Most Promising Newcomer and the 2008 Laurence Olivier Award for Best Actress in a Musical. She was also nominated in 2009 for a Glamour Woman of the Year Award for Best Actress.

== Personal life ==
Jones has two sons called Oscar and Barnaby Porter, born in 2013 and 2015. In 2016, she married Stephen Porter.
