= Elijah Kelley =

American actor, singer, and dancer (born 1986)

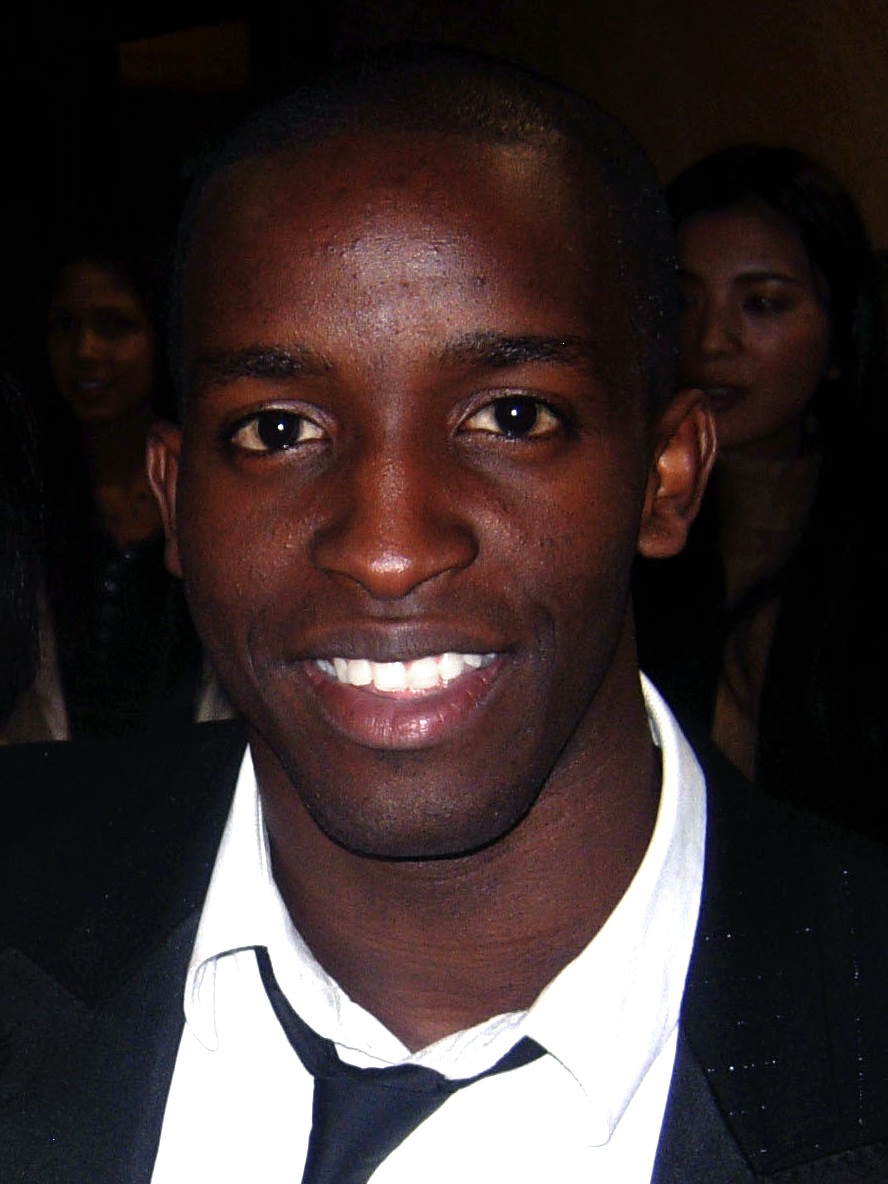
- Kelley in January 2008
- Born: August 1, 1986 (age 40); LaGrange, Georgia, U.S.
- Occupations: Actor; singer; dancer
- Years active: 1998–present

Elijah Kelley (born August 1, 1986) is an American actor, singer, and dancer. He appeared in films such as 28 Days (2000), Take the Lead (2006), Hairspray (2007), Red Tails (2012), Lee Daniels' The Butler (2013), NBC's live-musical event The Wiz Live! (2015), as Ricky Bell in The New Edition Story (2017), and Star (2017).

== Early life ==
Kelley was born and raised in LaGrange, Georgia. He attended Long Cane Middle School and Troup County High School, where he participated in the school's show choir for years. As a child, he starred in Coca-Cola commercials and played a role in the film Mama Flora's Family. He also performed in a church choir and gospel band with his family. His parents, determined to keep their son down to earth, went with him when he moved to Los Angeles after graduating from high school.

== Career ==
In 2007, Kelley starred in the film adaptation of Hairspray. Both his performance and the film received positive reviews. On December 2, 2011, Kelley sang "The Star-Spangled Banner" prior to the Pac-12 Conference Championship Game at Autzen Stadium in Eugene, Oregon.

In 2015, Kelley was cast in the role of the Scarecrow in NBC's production of The Wiz Live!. He also played a role as Sunny the elf from the animated George Lucas film Strange Magic from 2015.

He was cast as singer Ricky Bell for the 2017 BET Biographical miniseries The New Edition Story. He was credited for his help in considering Luke James, who is a long-time musical associate of his to audition for the producers of the miniseries to be cast as the bandmate Johnny Gill.

In 2017, Kelley was cast alongside Luke James as a recurring role for the 2nd season of Lee Daniels musical drama Star on FOX.

== Filmography ==
=== Film ===
Year	Title	Role	Notes
2000	28 Days	Darnell	
2006	Take the Lead	Danjou	
2006	Heavens Fall	Leroy Wright	
2007	Hairspray	Seaweed J. Stubbs	
2008	Rome & Jewel	Ben	Direct-to-video
2012	Red Tails	Samuel "Joker" George	
2013	The Butler	Charlie Gaines	
2014	Boys of Abu Ghraib	Tunde	
2015	Strange Magic	Sunny	Voice

=== Television ===
Year	Title	Role	Notes
1998	Mama Flora's Family	Young Willie	Television film
1999	A Lesson Before Dying	Clarence	Television film
2005	The Shield	Jaymon	Episode: "Grave"
2005	Everybody Hates Chris	Waiter	Episode: "Everybody Hates the Babysitter"
2006	Numb3rs	Anthony	Episode: "The OG"
2009	Dirty Sexy Money	Elon Elder	Episode: "The Facts"
2015	The Wiz Live!	Scarecrow / Sticks The Farmhand Man #3	NBC live TV musical
2017	The New Edition Story	Ricky Bell	BET 3-part Miniseries
2017–2018	Star	Andy	Recurring Role
2018	The Bobby Brown Story	Ricky Bell	BET 2-part Miniseries
2019	Tales	Paul	Episode: “Brothers”

== Discography ==
=== Soundtracks ===
- 2007: Hairspray Soundtrack
- 2008: DisneyMania 6
- 2008: Sex and the City: Original Motion Picture Soundtrack Vol. 2

=== Hairspray singles ===
- "Run and Tell That"
- "Come So Far"
- "Without Love"
- "You Can't Stop the Beat"

=== DisneyMania 6 singles ===
- "He Lives in You"

=== Semi-Pro ===
- "Shining Star"
