= Linda Hart =

American actress, singer and musician

- Born: Dallas, Texas, U.S.
- Education: Los Angeles City College
- Occupations: Actress, singer, musician
- Years active: 1969–present

Linda Hart is an American singer, musician, and actress, mainly appearing in musical theatre.

== Life and career ==
Hart was born in Dallas, Texas, United States. As a child, Hart sang in her church choir; at age seven, she joined her father, the late Rev. Ralph L. Hart, (a preacher) and the rest of the family in The Harts, a weekly gospel television series. Her father and uncle, the Rev. Doyle Hart, visited Detroit in 1954 and cut a 45 of "Ain't No Grave Gonna Hold My Body Down", later released by Ralph Hart and The Texas Musical Harts. Hart attended Los Angeles City College as a theatre major. During college, however, her family received a recording contract with Columbia Records; Hart joined them and moved to Nashville for the job. The group recorded several gospel albums, many nominated for Grammy Awards and one a winner.

Solo work included appearances with The New Christy Minstrels as their only female leader, a stint on Johnny Cash's ABC television show, where she also served as a talent coordinator for an episode, and opening act performances for country musicians such as Hank Williams, Jr., Mel Tillis, Roy Clark, and The Oak Ridge Boys. She joined Bette Midler's backup troupe, the Staggering Harlettes, and later appeared in the Midler film Stella and the television special of Gypsy: A Musical Fable in 1993, which also starred Midler. She costarred as Minnie Driver's mother in the film Beautiful.

=== Later career ===
Hart's Broadway debut was in the 1987 revival of Cole Porter's Anything Goes; for this role, she won a 1988 Theatre World Award. Originally portraying Erma, she later played the role of Reno Sweeney. Subsequent roles included Sid Caesar & Company and originated the role of Velma Von Tussle in Hairspray.

On television she had a starring role in the short-lived sitcom The Winner in 2006. Prior to this she had appeared in episodes of The Dukes of Hazzard, Night Court, Hill Street Blues, Major Dad, Touched by an Angel, The Practice, Desperate Housewives, and others, starting in the early 1980s. Among her film appearances are A Perfect World, Get Shorty, Tin Cup and Showtime.

She performed in the Seattle run of the musical Catch Me If You Can as Carol at the 5th Avenue Theatre, from July 28, 2009, to August 14, 2009, and returned to the role when the show premiered on Broadway in April 2011.
