= Mary Bond Davis =

American actress (born 1958)

- Born: June 3, 1958 (age 67); Los Angeles, California, U.S.
- Occupations: Singer; actress; dancer

Mary Bond Davis (born June 3, 1958) is a singer, actor, and dancer from Los Angeles, California. She is best known for her performance as Motormouth Maybelle in the 2002 Broadway run of Hairspray.

== Biography ==
Davis began her career at the age of 15 singing with different bands. She was a member of The Young Americans from 1974 to 1976, and appeared with them on The Bing Crosby Christmas Show.

In 1980, Davis auditioned for Ain't Misbehavin', which traveled throughout the United States and Canada, and in 1982, spent a year with the world tour of Ain't Misbehavin'.

Davis' most memorable film appearance is in Eddie Murphy's Coming to America. Additional film credits include Jo Jo Dancer, Your Life Is Calling; The Art Of Dying; Hook; Jeffrey; New York Minute; and Romance and Cigarettes.

Davis was in the original cast of the Broadway shows Mail, Jelly's Last Jam, Marie Christine, and Hairspray.

She is a three-time winner of the Drama-Logue Award (Get Happy, Shout Up A Morning, A...My Name Is Alice).

== Filmography ==
=== Film ===
Year	Title	Role	Notes	Ref(s)
1986	Jo Jo Dancer, Your Life Is Calling	Lady at Grandmother's House		
1988	Coming to America	Big Stank Woman		
1991	The Art of Dying	Jessie		
1991	Hook	Prostitute		
1995	Jeffrey	Church Lady #1		
1996	The Preacher's Wife	Bernita		
2004	New York Minute	Big Shirl		
2005	Romance & Cigarettes	Female Dancer & Singer	Final film role	

=== Television ===
Year	Title	Role	Notes	Ref(s)
1984	Gimme a Break!	—N/a	Episode: "James Returns" {{{last}}}	
1990	Twin Peaks	Female Parole Board Member #1	Episode, The One-Armed Man	
1990	Piece of Cake	Mrs Wilson	Television film	
2002	Stage on Screen: The Women	Maggie	TV Film	

=== Stage ===
Year	Title	Role	Notes
1988	Mail	Brunhilda/Lois T. Wertshafter/Mama Utility/Operator/Pitchperson/Radio Singer	Music Box Theatre, Broadway
1992	Jelly's Last Jam	Miss Mamie/Ancestor	Virginia Theatre, Broadway
1994	Grease	Teen Angel (Replacement)	Eugene O'Neill Theatre, Broadway
1999	Marie Christine	Prisoner #3	Vivian Beaumont Theater, Broadway
2001	The Women	Maggie	American Airlines Theatre, Broadway
2002	Hairspray	Motormouth Maybelle	Neil Simon Theatre, Broadway
