= Good Morning Baltimore =

2002 song from the musical Hairspray

Song by Marissa Jaret Winokur

from the album Hairspray
- Released: August 13, 2002
- Genre: Show tune; pop
- Length: 3:40
- Label: Sony Classical
- Composer: Marc Shaiman
- Lyricists: Marc Shaiman; Scott Wittman

"Good Morning Baltimore" is the opening number of the 2002 musical Hairspray. Written by Marc Shaiman and Scott Wittman, it is performed by the protagonist, Tracy Turnblad, and alludes to the distinctive beat and vocal effects ("oh-oh-oh") of The Ronettes' 1963 hit "Be My Baby".

== Production ==
In the 2007 film, Tracy, played by Nikki Blonsky, blinks her eyes in time with the music at the beginning of this number. The "flasher who lives next door" is played by John Waters, the director of the 1988 film.

== Synopsis ==
Tracy Turnblad wakes up to a new day in Baltimore, and sings about everything she encounters on the way to school. She dreams of being a star. The song "takes us through Tracy’s morning routine, for instance, hitching a ride with the garbage man when she misses the bus for school."

== Analysis ==
About.com examines the song's themes:

The opening number "Good Morning, Baltimore" tells us everything we need to know about the protagonist. She is a goddess of optimism. Although she lives in a society in which she is considered "plump," Tracy sees herself as beautiful. Moreover, she believes there is beauty in subjects that most would deem ugly. During the song she croons, "The rats on the street / All dance around my feet." She also greets the denizens of Baltimore, including a drunk and a flasher. In her eyes, they are kindred spirits. The song also reveals her ambitious nature. Her main dream is to become a dancer on the Corny Collins Show, a local television show featuring attractive teens from Tracy's school.

Answers.com adds further insight:

This is the exuberant beginning of the story. The young and rotund Tracy dreams of a time when she can dance on her favorite TV show. Despite being criticized for her weight and looked down upon for her radical views on race, Tracy is a bright optimist. In this song, she welcomes another day in her beloved Baltimore, Maryland. The tone of the song is lightly satirical, as the movie shows some of the more unsavory aspects of the city, including the rats and roaches. Tracy sings of her aspirations and hunger for life, knowing there is something out there waiting for her.

== Critical reception ==
BroadwayReviewed wrote, "'Good Morning Baltimore' from the musical Hairspray is one of the most well known songs from the broadway show. Not only does everyone love this show tune, but it is an awesome song to represent the city. It is positive, funny and a bit quirky, just like Baltimore." It adds that the song "is the perfect way to open the show because it isn’t just funny, but it is a fun song to sing. It walks you through the city and you even somewhat feel like you are actually there when she is describing it."

Talkin' Broadway described the song as a "lovably cheesy 1960s pop". Common Sense Media said this "infectious song...sets the cheery tone" of the rest of the 2007 film. Similarly, CinemaBlend wrote, "The song immediately sets the toe-tapping tone for the rest of the film".

== Reprise ==
A reprise is performed by Tracy as she is imprisoned for protesting. The lyrics are changed to show Tracy's loneliness and love for Link.
