= Hairspray (1988 soundtrack) =

Hairspray: Original Motion Picture Soundtrack

Soundtrack album by Various Artists
- Released: 1988
- Genres: Rock and roll, traditional pop, rhythm and blues
- Length: 30:50
- Label: MCA Records

Hairspray: Original Motion Picture Soundtrack is a soundtrack of the 1988 John Waters film, Hairspray.

Professional ratings
Review scores
| Source | Rating |
|---|---|
| Allmusic | link |

== Track listing ==
It features one original song and rock and roll and rhythm and blues songs by other artists that were used in the film. The soundtrack was released in 1988 by MCA Records. Several other songs were used, however, due to licensing restrictions, they could not be included for the album. Many of them were on Cameo Parkway Records, which was owned by Allen Klein.

=== Side one ===
1. "Hairspray" by Rachel Sweet with Deborah Harry - 3:13
2. "The Madison Time" by The Ray Bryant Combo - 3:07
3. "I'm Blue (The Gong-Gong Song)" by The Ikettes - 2:28
4. "Mama Didn't Lie" by Jan Bradley - 2:00
5. "Town Without Pity" by Gene Pitney - 2:52
6. "The Roach" by Gene and Wendell - 2:30

=== Side two ===
1. "Foot Stompin'" by The Flares - 2:16
2. "Shake a Tail Feather" by The Five Du-Tones - 2:21
3. "The Bug" by Jerry Dallman and the Knightcaps - 2:15
4. "You'll Lose a Good Thing" by Barbara Lynn - 2:18
5. "I Wish I Were a Princess" by Little Peggy March - 2:13
6. "Nothing Takes the Place of You" by Toussaint McCall - 3:17

Songs appearing in the film, but not on the soundtrack due to licensing restrictions:

- "Limbo Rock" – Chubby Checker
- "Let's Twist Again" - Chubby Checker
- "Day-O" – Pia Zadora
- "Duke of Earl" – Gene Chandler
- "Train to Nowhere" – The Champs
- "Dancin' Party" – Chubby Checker
- "The Fly" – Chubby Checker
- "The Bird" – The Dutones (not to be confused with The Five Du-Tones, who are also featured on the soundtrack)
- "Pony Time" – Chubby Checker
- "Hide and Go Seek" – Bunker Hill
- "Mashed Potato Time" – Dee Dee Sharp
- "Gravy (For My Mashed Potatoes)" – Dee Dee Sharp
- "Waddle, Waddle" – The Bracelets
- "Do the New Continental" – The Dovells
- "You Don't Own Me" – Lesley Gore
- "Life's Too Short" – The Lafayettes

== See also ==
- Hairspray (1988) - the original movie
