= Corey Reynolds =

American actor

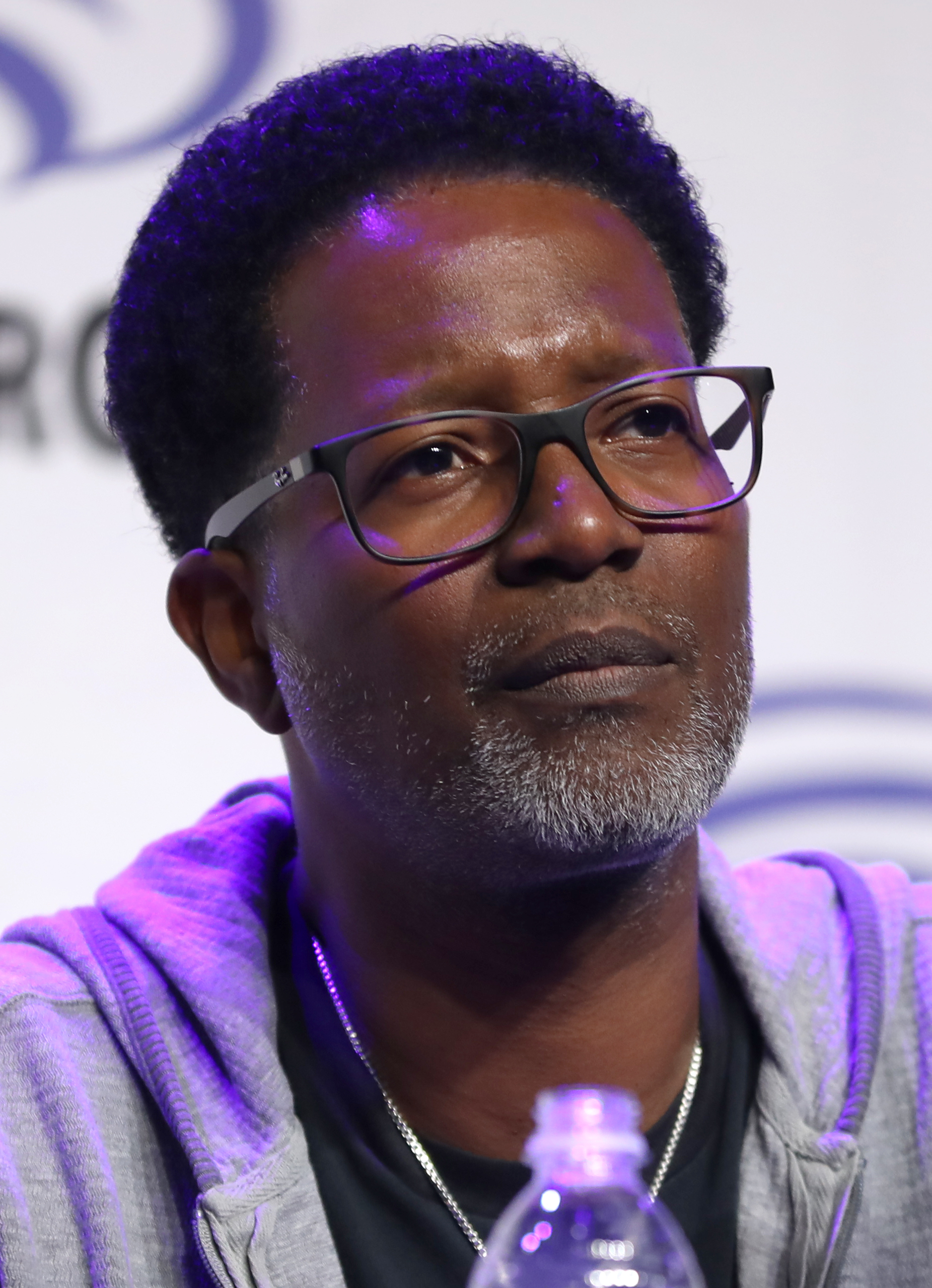
- Reynolds at the 2024 WonderCon
- Born: July 3, 1974 (age 52); Richmond, Virginia, U.S.
- Occupation: Actor
- Years active: 1999–present
- Spouse: Tara Renee Schemansky (m. 2008)

Corey Reynolds (born July 3, 1974) is an American actor known for originating the role of Seaweed in the Broadway adaptation of Hairspray, as well as the roles of David Gabriel in the TNT crime series The Closer, and Sheriff Mike Thompson in the SyFy/USA Network TV series Resident Alien.

== Early life and career ==
Reynolds was born in Richmond, Virginia, where he attended Monacan High School before moving to California to pursue his acting career. He got his start at Paramount Kings Dominion performing in various shows. While living in California, he was cast in a touring production of the revue Smokey Joe's Cafe, as well as the tour of Saturday Night Fever. After this run, he went to New York City and auditioned for various shows. He was originally cast in Hairspray's ensemble, but was offered the role of Seaweed after three readings. For this role, he was nominated for a Tony Award and Drama Desk Award, both for Outstanding Featured Actor in a Musical.

Reynolds guest starred on Without a Trace and appeared in The Guardian prior to his role in The Closer. To research this role, Reynolds drew on his past career in security and law enforcement.

Reynolds has appeared in films such as The Terminal, Red Tails, and Straight Outta Compton. He plays Sheriff Mike Thompson in the SyFy comedy-drama Resident Alien.

== Filmography ==
=== Film ===
| Year | Title | Role | Notes |
|---|---|---|---|
| 1999 | Magic Gum | Number 1 | Short |
| 2004 | The Terminal | Waylin | |
| 2005 | Partner(s) | William | |
| 2011 | The Wereth Eleven | Narrator | |
| 2014 | Selma | Rev. C. T. Vivian | |
| 2015 | Straight Outta Compton | Lonzo Williams | |
| 2015 | The Meddler | Officer Wells | |

=== Television ===
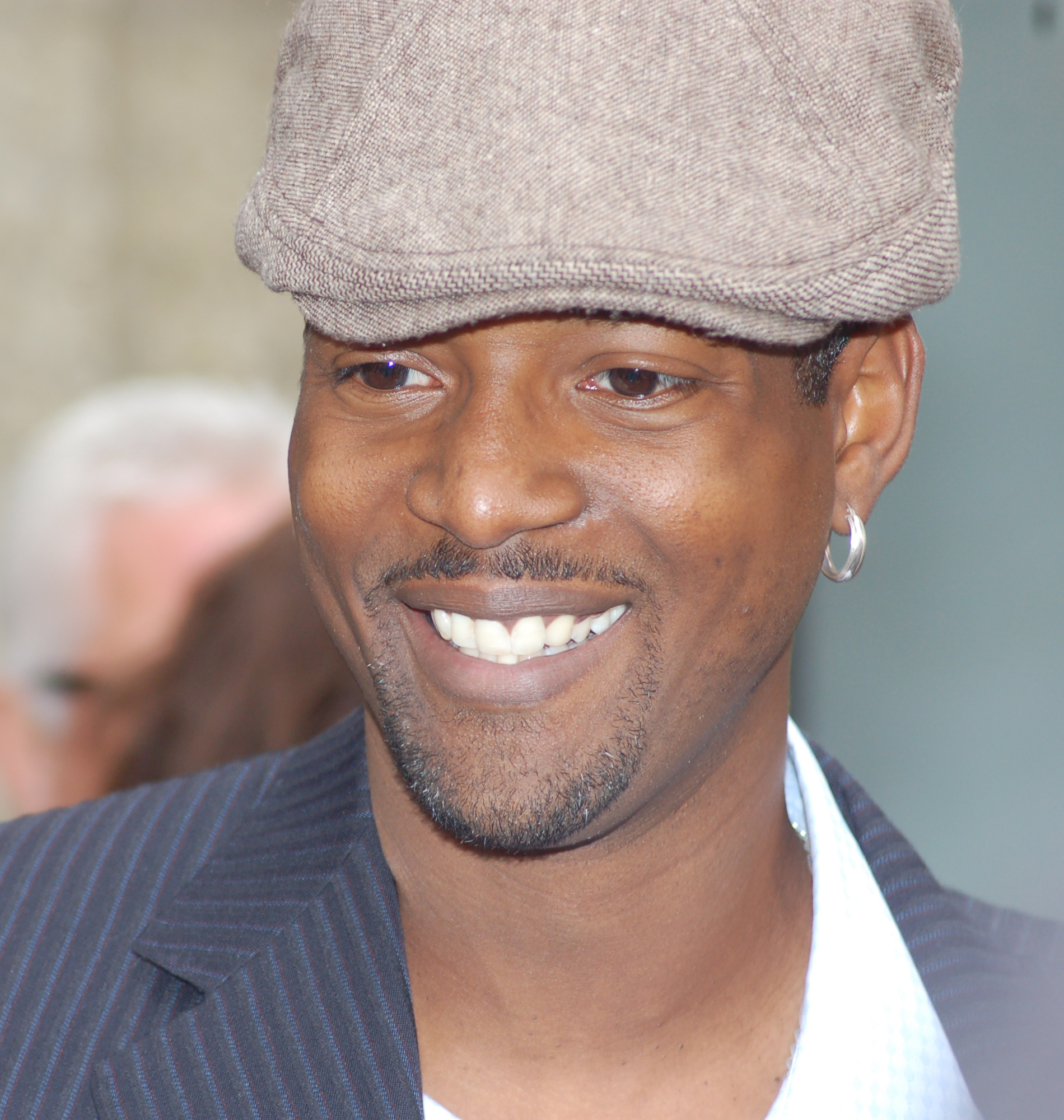
Reynolds in June 2009

| Year | Title | Role | Notes |
|---|---|---|---|
| 2002 | Christmas in Rockefeller Center | Himself | Television Special |
| 2003 | The 57th Annual Tony Awards | Himself | Television Special |
| 2003 | The Early Show | Himself | 1 Episode |
| 2003 | Eve | Malcolm 'Khalif' Davis | 1 Episode |
| 2003 | The Guardian | Robert Bridge | 2 Episodes |
| 2005–2012 | The Closer | David Gabriel | 109 episodes |
| 2005 | Without a Trace | Damon Ferris | 1 episode |
| 2007 | CSI: Miami | Steve Gryson | 1 episode |
| 2007 | Private Practice | Ray Paget | 1 episode |
| 2009 | NCIS | Lieutenant Commander Aaban El-Sayad | 1 episode |
| 2009 | Entertainment Tonight | Himself | 2 episodes |
| 2010 | Curb: The Discussion | Himself | 2 episodes |
| 2010 | 41st NAACP Image Awards | Himself | Television Special |
| 2012 | The Closer Series Finale: Red Carpet | Himself | Television Special |
| 2014 | Delirium | Tack | Television Movie |
| 2015 | Getting On | Waylon Ortley | 3 episodes |
| 2015 | Castle | Mark West | S8 ep 6 |
| 2016 | Cooper Barrett's Guide to Surviving Life | Frank | 1episode |
| 2016 | Murder in the First | Assistant District Attorney Martin Reardon | 10 episodes |
| 2016 | Masters of Sex | James Bell | 2 episodes |
| 2017 | NCIS: Los Angeles | ATF Agent Duke Morgan | 2 episodes |
| 2017–2018 | Criminal Minds | Phil Brooks | 2 episodes |
| 2017 | Chicago P.D. | Steve Burns | 1 episode |
| 2017 | SEAL Team | Scott Patton | 1 episode |
| 2019–2026 | All American | Cliff Mosley | 10 episodes |
| 2019 | The Red Line | Harrison Brennan | 3 episodes |
| 2021–2025 | Resident Alien | Sheriff Mike Thompson | 44 episodes |
