= Hairspray (musical) =

American musical

- Broadway promotional poster
- Music: Marc Shaiman
- Lyrics: Scott Wittman; Marc Shaiman
- Book: Mark O'Donnell; Thomas Meehan
- Basis: Hairspray by John Waters
- Productions: 2002 Seattle; 2002 Broadway; 2003 US tour; 2004 Toronto; 2007 West End; 2010 UK tour; 2013 UK tour; 2015 UK tour; 2017 UK tour; 2022 US tour; 2021 West End revival; 2025 UK Tour
- Awards: Tony Award for Best Musical; Tony Award for Best Book; Tony Award for Best Score; Laurence Olivier Award for Best New Musical

Hairspray is an American musical with music by Marc Shaiman and lyrics by Shaiman and Scott Wittman, with a book by Mark O'Donnell and Thomas Meehan, based on John Waters's 1988 film of the same name. The songs include 1960s-style dance music and "downtown" rhythm and blues. Set in 1962 Baltimore, Maryland, the production follows teenage Tracy Turnblad's dream to dance on The Corny Collins Show, a local TV dance program based on the real-life Buddy Deane Show. When Tracy wins a role on the show, she becomes a celebrity overnight, leading to social change as Tracy campaigns for the show's integration.

The musical opened in Seattle in 2002 and moved to Broadway later that year. In 2003, Hairspray won eight Tony Awards, including one for Best Musical, out of 13 nominations. It ran for 2,642 performances, and closed on January 4, 2009. Hairspray has also had national tours, a West End production, and numerous foreign productions and was adapted as a 2007 musical film. The London production was nominated for a record-setting eleven Laurence Olivier Awards, winning four, including Best New Musical.

== Background ==
According to interviews included as an extra feature on the 2007 film's DVD release, theater producer Margo Lion first conceived of Hairspray as a stage musical in 1998 after seeing the original film on television. "I was home looking at a lot of movies, and one of those movies was Hairspray." She contacted John Waters, who gave her his blessing, then acquired the rights from New Line Cinema. Lion contacted Marc Shaiman, who expressed interest in the project only if his partner, Scott Wittman, could participate, and Lion agreed. The two enlisted the help of actress and singer Annie Golden to produce a demo recording containing three songs, one of which, "Good Morning Baltimore", became the show's opening number. Based on their initial work, Lion was confident that she had hired the right team.

Lion contacted Rob Marshall about directing the musical. At the time he was involved in negotiations to direct the screen adaptation of Chicago, but he agreed to become involved in the early development stages of Hairspray with the stipulation he would drop out if assigned the film. Marshall remembered Marissa Jaret Winokur from her brief appearance in the film American Beauty and arranged a meeting with Shaiman and Wittman. The two immediately felt she was right to play Tracy Turnblad but hesitated to commit without seeing any other auditions. They hired Winokur to work with them on the project with the understanding she might be replaced later. A year later, Winokur was diagnosed with cervical cancer. Certain she would lose the role if the creative team learned about her condition, she underwent a hysterectomy, telling only her immediate family. The treatment and surgery succeeded, and Winokur returned to the project. Meanwhile, Marshall began work on Chicago, and Lion hired Jack O'Brien and Jerry Mitchell to direct and to choreograph, respectively. Winokur was one of the first to audition for the role of Tracy and spent two years preparing with voice and dance lessons. Divine portrayed Tracy's mother, Edna Turnblad, in the original film, and Shaiman liked the idea of maintaining the tradition of casting a man as Edna. Harvey Fierstein auditioned for the role with a "half-hour vocal audition". He thought they were "pacifying" him, but was told, "They don't want anyone but you".

According to Shaiman, one song, "I Know Where I've Been", became controversial during the genesis of the score:

This was ... inspired by a scene late in the [1988] movie that takes place on the black side of town. It never dawned on us that a torrent of protest would follow us from almost everyone involved with the show. "It's too sad. ... It's too preachy. ... It doesn't belong. ... Tracy should sing the eleven o'clock number." We simply didn't want our show to be yet another showbiz version of a civil rights story where the black characters are just background. And what could be more Tracy Turnblad-like than to give the "eleven o'clock number" to the black family at the heart of the struggle? Luckily ... the audiences embraced this moment, which enriches the happy ending to follow, and it is our proudest achievement of the entire experience of writing Hairspray.

== Productions ==
=== Original Broadway production ===
After a successful tryout at Seattle's 5th Avenue Theatre, Hairspray opened on Broadway at the Neil Simon Theatre on August 15, 2002. Jack O'Brien directed the production, which Jerry Mitchell choreographed, with set design by David Rockwell, costume design by William Ivey Long, lighting design by Kenneth Posner, sound design by Steve C. Kennedy, and the show's many distinctive wigs by Paul Huntley. The performances were conducted by Lon Hoyt, with approximately 15 musicians. The original Broadway cast included Marissa Jaret Winokur and Harvey Fierstein as Tracy and Edna, respectively, Matthew Morrison as Link, Laura Bell Bundy as Amber, Kerry Butler as Penny, Linda Hart as Velma, Mary Bond Davis as Motormouth Maybelle, Corey Reynolds as Seaweed, Jackie Hoffman as Matron, Dick Latessa as Wilbur, and Clarke Thorell as Corny Collins. Kamilah Marshall, Shayna Steele, and Judine Richard played the Dynamites.

Hairspray received Tony Award nominations in 13 categories, winning eight, including for best musical, book, score and direction. Winokur, Fierstein and Latessa received awards for their performances. The production ran for more than six years, closing on January 4, 2009, after 2,642 performances. Thorell returned to the cast for the final ten months. Fierstein and Winokur returned to the cast for the final performances.

=== Original London production ===
The West End production opened at the Shaftesbury Theatre on October 11, 2007, for previews before its official opening on October 30. Michael Ball played Edna, with Mel Smith as Wilbur Turnblad, Leanne Jones as Tracy, Tracie Bennett as Velma, Paul Manuel as Corny Collins, Rachael Wooding as Amber, Elinor Collett as Penny, and Ben James-Ellis as Link. The original creative team of the Broadway production, with the director Jack O'Brien and choreographer Jerry Mitchell, reunited for the London production. The show garnered a record-setting 11 Olivier Award nominations and won Best New Musical, as well as Best Actress and Actor in a musical (Jones and Ball). The production closed on March 28, 2010, after nearly two and a half years and over 1,000 performances.

==== 2021 London revival ====
The production was due to return to the West End at the London Coliseum for a limited 18-week season from 23 April to 29 August 2020, but the COVID-19 pandemic caused all public theatres to close indefinitely in mid-March. The production was initially delayed to 1 September to 8 November, and then delayed again to 21 June to 29 September 2021.

Michael Ball reprised his Olivier Award-winning role as Edna, reuniting him with director Jack O'Brien and choreographer Jerry Mitchell. Full casting includes Lizzie Bea as Tracy, Marisha Wallace as Motormouth Maybelle, Les Dennis as Wilbur Turnblad, Rita Simons as Velma Von Tussle, Jonny Amies as Link Larkin, and Mari McGinlay as Penny Pingleton. Paul Merton was originally set to make his West End debut as Wilbur but after several delays he was unable to join the company and was replaced by Dennis.

=== 2010 Australian production ===
An Australian production of Hairspray opened in Melbourne at the Princess Theatre on October 2, 2010, to critical acclaim. It was directed by David Atkins and choreographed by So You Think You Can Dance Australia judge Jason Coleman. The show moved to Sydney on June 23, 2011. The cast included Jaz Flowers as Tracy, Trevor Ashley as Edna, Jack Chambers as Link, and Tevin Campbell reprising his role from the Broadway production as Seaweed. Atkins redesigned the production using new technology. The set used enormous LED screens that moved around the stage in various combinations as the characters interacted with animated landscapes generated across the screens. The musical opened at Sydney's Lyric Theatre at The Star Casino on 11 June 2011 and closed on 25 September 2011, two weeks earlier than anticipated.

==== 2022 Australian Broadway revival ====
A revival of the original Broadway production opened at Melbourne's Regent Theatre in August 2022, 20 years after the original production opened on Broadway. The original direction and choreography (by Jack O'Brien and Jerry Mitchell, respectively), was recreated by director Matt Lenz and choreographer Dominic Shaw. The cast included Carmel Rodrigues as Tracy, Shane Jacobson as Edna, Rhonda Burchmore as Velma, Todd McKenney as Wilbur, Rob Mills as Corny Collins, Sean Johnston as Link and Asabi Goodman as Motormouth Maybelle. The production moved on to Adelaide's Festival Centre in December 2022 where the role of Corny Collins was taken over by Irish born Australian, Bobby Fox. The Adelaide production closed on 29 January 2023. The production then continued to Sydney's Lyric Theatre where it opened on 9 February 2023 and closed on 2 April 2023.

=== Tours ===
The first U.S. national tour started in September 2003 in Baltimore and ended in June 2006. It starred Carly Jibson as Tracy, Bruce Vilanch as Edna, Terron Brooks as Seaweed, Sandra DeNise as Penny, Susan Cella as Velma, and Ramona Cole (soon replaced by Charlotte Crossley) as Motormouth Maybelle. When the tour came to Los Angeles, Winokur reprised her role as Tracy, together with the original Broadway Link, Matthew Morrison. The same creative team of O'Brien and Mitchell was at the helm. Lon Hoyt served as music supervisor. Jim Vukovich served as music director for the entire 33 months on the road.

In July 2006, a non-Equity U.S. and Asian tour opened in Atlantic City's Harrah's Casino. The shorter "casino version" was used for a six-week run, but when the tour moved on, it continued with the full version minus the character of Lorraine. The production starred Brooklynn Pulver as Tracy, Jerry O'Boyle as Edna, Dan Ferretti as Wilbur, Constantine Rousouli as Link, Christian Dante White as Seaweed, Alyssa Malgeri as Penny, Jarret Mallon as Corny, Happy McPartlin as Velma, Pearl Thomas as Amber, and Yvette Clark as Motormouth Maybelle. The tour played sit-down engagements in Tokyo, Shanghai and Beijing. It gave its final performance on April 25, 2010, at the Fox Performing Arts Center in Riverside, California.

After the West End production closed, Hairspray began touring the UK and Ireland, starting at the Wales Millennium Centre in Cardiff on April 7, 2010, following previews from March 30. The tour starred Michael Ball as Edna, alternating with Michael Starke and Brian Conley; Les Dennis, Nigel Planer and Micky Dolenz alternating as Wilbur, and Laurie Scarth as Tracy.

Hairspray toured the UK and Ireland in 2013. The show opened on February 13 in The Lowry Theatre in Manchester with Mark Benton as Edna, Lucy Benjamin as Velma, Sandra Marvin as Motormouth Maybelle, Marcus Collins as Seaweed, and Freya Sutton as Tracy. MM Musicals presented the show at FairfieldHalls, Croydon, in the Ashcroft Theatre, from 19 to 22 November 2014, with Corin Miller as Tracy, Andy Lingfield as Edna, and Natalie Cave as Penny.

Mark Goucher produced a Hairspray tour in the UK from September 2015, starting at the Curve, Leicester. The production returned at the end of summer 2017 to once again tour the UK, starring Norman Pace as Wilbur, Brenda Edwards as Motormouth, Layton Williams, and Rebecca Mendoza as Tracy. The Curve production and subsequent tours were directed by Paul Kerryson with choreography by Drew McOnie.

The production toured the UK and Ireland again in 2021 directed by Paul Kerryson and starring Brenda Edwards as Motormouth Maybelle and Norman Pace as Wilbur. It opened in Plymouth on 24 June 2021 before touring around the UK into 2022.

The production is set to tour the UK and Ireland again in 2027, opening at the Palace Theatre in Manchester in July 2027.

=== Other productions ===
Las Vegas

A Las Vegas production ran at the Luxor Hotel in 2006 starring Katrina Rose Dideriksen as Tracy, Austin Miller as Link, and Fierstein and Latessa reprising their roles as Edna and Wilbur. This 90-minute version was played in one act. Cut songs included "The Big Dollhouse", "(The Legend of) Miss Baltimore Crabs", "Velma's Revenge", "Good Morning Baltimore (Reprise)", and "Cooties".

Royal Caribbean International

Royal Caribbean International presented the show on their first Oasis Class ship Oasis of the Seas, which made its maiden voyage in December 2009. The show was performed in the ship's 1350 seat Opal Theater three times on each seven-night cruise but was later replaced by Cats.

In 2018 the Symphony of the Seas made its maiden voyage, and due to multiple requests, Hairspray was added as a show. It is still being performed in one act, restoring "(The Legend of) Miss Baltimore Crabs" but like the Las Vegas version omitting "The Big Dollhouse", "Velma's Revenge", "Good Morning Baltimore (Reprise)", and "Cooties". The second verse of "It Takes Two" is also omitted. This show includes multiple uses of technology, combined with a company of singers and dancers. It is usually performed three or four times a week, along with a Royal Caribbean Production called “Flight: Dare to Dream”.

==== U.S. regional premiere ====
Weathervane Playhouse, in Newark, Ohio, performed the U.S. regional premiere from July 29 to August 7, 2010, immediately followed by The Riverton Arts Council in Riverton, Utah, at the Sandra N. Lloyd Performing Arts Center from July 30 to August 21, 2010.

Hollywood Bowl

Production at the Hollywood Bowl ran from August 5–7, 2011, directed and choreographed by Jerry Mitchell. Original Broadway cast members Fierstein and Winokur reprised their roles as Edna and Tracy. The cast also featured Corbin Bleu (Seaweed), Drew Carey (Wilbur), Diana DeGarmo (Penny), Mo Gaffney (Prudy and others), Nick Jonas (Link Larkin), Darlene Love (Motormouth Maybelle), Susan Anton (Velma), and John Stamos (Corny).

=== International productions ===
The first international production opened in Toronto at the Princess of Wales Theatre in April 2004 and ran for 245 performances. Vanessa Olivarez, a former American Idol contestant, starred as Tracy, and Jay Brazeau starred as Edna. The cast also included Tom Rooney as Wilbur, Fran Jaye as Motormouth Maybelle, Matthew Morgan as Seaweed, Shennel Campbell as Little Inez, Jennifer Stewart as Penny, Michael Torontow as Link, Susan Henley as Velma, Tara Macri as Amber, Kevin Meaney and Charlotte Moore as the Authority Figures, and Paul McQuillan as Corny. Rounding out the opening night cast were Caissie Levy, Steven Cutts, Felicia Dinwiddie, Karen Burthwright, Jesse Weafer, Clyde Alves, Breanne Arrigo, Lisa Bell, Adam Bolton, Amanda DeFreitas, Starr Dominigue, Nicolas Dromard, Desmond Osborne, Melanie Phillipson, Stephanie Pitsiladis, Christine Rossi, Avery Saltzman, Sheldon Smith, Alison Smyth, Lindsay Thomas, Darren Voros, Derek Wiens, and Ryan Wilson.

A South African production opened in Johannesburg in October 2007 with the original direction and choreography recreated by Matt Lenz and Greg Graham. New set and costume designs were by Michael Bottari and Ronald Case. A production in Buenos Aires, Argentina, opened on July 16, 2008, starring Enrique Pinti as Edna. The role of Tracy was cast through a reality-competition show called Yo Quiero Ser la Protagonista de Hairspray (I Want to Be Hairspray's Protagonist).

On November 14, 2008, a production of Hairspray in Manila, the Philippines, starred Madel Ching as Tracy and Michael de Mesa as Edna. The production closed on December 7, 2008. On July 10, 2009, a Brazilian production opened in Rio de Janeiro, starring Simone Gutierrez as Tracy and Edson Celulari as Edna. A 2010 Brazilian tour stopped in São Paulo, Brasília, Curitiba and Porto Alegre. On July 4, 2024, a Brazilian revival opened in Rio de Janeiro and São Paulo in September 5, starring Vânia Canto as Tracy and Tiago Abravanel as Edna.

A Dutch production ran during the 2009/2010 season. Edna was played by Arjan Ederveen and Link was Jim Bakkum (runner-up in the first season of the Dutch American Idol). On December 6, 2009 a German production opened in Cologne. Edna was played alternately by Uwe Ochsenknecht and comedian Tetje Mierendorf. Tracy was played by Maite Kelly, a former member of The Kelly Family, and Penny was Jana Stelley. The first production of Hairspray in the German language took place at the Theater St. Gallen, Switzerland. A re-creation of the Broadway/West End production of the show opened in Dubai in July 2010 with Leanne Jones, from the West End production, reprising her role as Tracy and Antony Stuart-Hicks as Edna.

A Japanese production was scheduled to run at the Toshima Arts and Culture Theatre, Tokyo in June 2020 and at Umeda Arts Theater, Osaka in July 2020. It was canceled due to the COVID-19 outbreak. It featured Naomi Watanabe as Tracy, Yuichiro Yamaguchi as Edna, Zen Ishikawa as Wilbur, Crystal Kay as Motormouth Maybelle, Jun Sena as Velma, Kohei Ueguchi as Corny, Kurumi Shimizu as Penny, Hiroki Miura as Link, Soichi Hirama as Seaweed, and Meimi Tamura (former ANGERME member) as Amber. The production ultimately ran at the Toshima theater from September 17 to October 2, 2022 and at Umeda Arts Theater in August 2022. Pop star Eliana replaced Crystal Kay in the role of Motormouth Maybelle.

Other productions opened in Canada, Finland, Japan, South Korea, Italy, St. Gallen, Switzerland, and Brazil. The musical also played in Shanghai, China, at the Shanghai Grand Theatre in July 2008, Stockholm, Sweden in September 2008, and in Tivoli Gardens, Copenhagen, Denmark in March 2016. Other productions are planned for France, Israel, Iceland, Norway and Mexico. Hairspray has been translated into German, Finnish, Spanish, Dutch, Japanese, Korean, Italian, Portuguese, French, and Hebrew.

A production was performed at the Hong Kong Cultural Center by a performing arts company called Face Production. They won an HK Heckler Award for Best Musical, Best Actress and Best Set Design.

Another Japanese production was scheduled to run at the Toshima Arts and Culture Theatre, Tokyo from September 17 to October 2, 2022 and at Umeda Arts Theater, Osaka in August 2022. It featured Naomi Watanabe as Tracy, Yuichiro Yamaguchi as Edna, Zen Ishikawa as Wilbur, Eliana as Motormouth Maybelle, Jun Sena as Velma, Kohei Ueguchi as Corny, Kurumi Shimizu as Penny, Hiroki Miura as Link, Soichi Hirama as Seaweed, and Meimi Tamura as Amber.

=== School adaptation ===
In August 2008, the British television channel Sky 1 began broadcasting Hairspray: The School Musical, which followed the development of a North London comprehensive school's production of Hairspray from audition to performance, with input from various actors and creatives, including members of the Broadway production team and the West End cast.

The Junior version released by MTI excludes the musical numbers "I Can Hear the Bells", "(The Legend of) Miss Baltimore Crabs", "Velma's Revenge", "Big, Blonde, and Beautiful", "(You're) Timeless To Me", "(You're) Timeless To Me (Reprise)" and the character Harriman F. Spritzer.

=== NBC live television ===
Hairspray was a live musical produced by NBC and broadcast on December 7, 2016. Maddie Baillio played Tracy. Jennifer Hudson and Harvey Fierstein starred as Motormouth Maybelle and Edna, respectively. Martin Short portrayed Wilbur and Derek Hough played Corny. Kristin Chenoweth starred as Velma, and Ariana Grande played Penny. The roles of Amber, Link, and Seaweed were played by Dove Cameron, Garrett Clayton, and Ephraim Sykes, respectively. Sean Hayes portrayed Mr. Pinky, and Rosie O'Donnell played the gym teacher.

== Synopsis ==
=== Act I ===
It is June 1962 in Baltimore. Tracy Turnblad, an overweight high school student, wakes up ("Good Morning Baltimore") and goes to school, where she receives a warning for "inappropriate hair height". After school, Tracy rushes home with her best friend, Penny, to catch the local teenage dance show, The Corny Collins Show ("The Nicest Kids in Town"). Edna, Tracy's shy and overweight mother, is ironing and complains about the noise of the music coming from the television, while Penny's mother, Prudy, complains about it being "race music". After an announcement that auditions for a place on the show will be held because Brenda (one of the Corny Collins Council Members) has taken a leave of absence from the show for "nine months", Tracy begs her mother for permission to audition. Fearing that Tracy will be laughed at due to her weight, Edna refuses, though Tracy's father Wilbur encourages her. Penny and Amber (the main dancer on The Corny Collins Show) have similar arguments with their mothers ("Mama, I'm a Big Girl Now").

After gaining permission and support from her father, Wilbur, Tracy auditions for the show and bumps into a teenage heartthrob, Link Larkin, which leads into a dream sequence ("I Can Hear the Bells"). Velma Von Tussle, the racist producer of The Corny Collins Show, rejects Tracy at the audition because of her size ("(The Legend of) Miss Baltimore Crabs"), and rejects a black girl, Little Inez.

Back at school, Tracy is sent to detention for her "monumental hair-don't". There she meets black dancer Seaweed J. Stubbs (the son of the hostess of "Negro Day" on The Corny Collins Show, Motormouth Maybelle), who teaches her several dance moves. She uses the new dance steps at the Sophomore Hop the next day to introduce herself to Corny Collins ("The Madison"). After Corny sees Tracy dance, he gives her a place on the show ("The Nicest Kids in Town" (Reprise)). During the broadcast, Link, at Corny's suggestion, sings "It Takes Two" to Tracy, much to Amber's dismay. After the show, Mr. Spritzer, the show's worrisome sponsor, appeals to Velma over Tracy's appointment to the Council. Threatening to fire Corny from the show, Velma is eventually left distraught and determines to ruin Tracy ("Velma's Revenge").

At the Turnblad house, Edna is receiving calls from fans who saw Tracy on the show. A call comes in from Mr. Pinky, the owner of a plus-size dress shop, for an endorsement. Tracy pleads with her mother to come with her and to act as her agent although Edna has not left their apartment in years. Finally making it outside, Edna is given a huge makeover ("Welcome to the 60's") and Tracy becomes the shop's spokes-girl. At school, signs of Tracy's fame are evident in the schoolyard, with graffiti on the walls and Shelly, another Council Member, sporting Tracy's signature hairdo. During a game of dodgeball, a jealous Amber knocks Tracy out, and Link rushes to her side. Penny and Seaweed, who have developed a liking for each other, rush to fetch the school nurse, only to find her out sick. Seaweed, suggesting that some fun would make Tracy feel better, invites all of them to his mother's record shop for a platter party ("Run and Tell That").

At the shop, Tracy rallies everyone to march against the station on the following day's Mother-Daughter Day, as blacks are not allowed on the show except on the monthly Negro Day. Before they start, Motormouth Maybelle convinces the initially reluctant Edna and Wilbur to march as well. Link declined to participate for the sake of his contract with the show. During the protest, led by Motormouth, Velma calls the police and fights break out. When the police arrive on the scene, almost everyone is arrested ("Big, Blonde and Beautiful").

=== Act II ===
After the march, most of the women are locked up in a women's penitentiary ("The Big Dollhouse"). Because of Velma's dirty tactics, the governor pardons and releases her and Amber. Wilbur bails out the rest, except Tracy, who is forced to remain in jail through another one of Velma's manipulations. Tracy is alone and wishes that Link could be with her ("Good Morning Baltimore" (Reprise)). Back at the Har-De-Har Hut (Wilbur's joke shop), Wilbur and Edna are left destitute because of the money it took to bail everyone out. Edna sympathizes with Tracy's dream—she had dreamed of making her "own line of queen-sized dress patterns". Edna and Wilbur reminisce about their past and how they can never be parted from each other ("(You're) Timeless to Me"). During the night, Link sneaks into the jail, where he finds Tracy in solitary confinement. As Link and Tracy reunite, Penny's mother, Prudy, punishes Penny for "going to jail without her permission" and ties her up in her bedroom, where Seaweed comes to her rescue. Both couples declare their love ("Without Love"). After escaping their respective prisons, the couples seek refuge at Motormouth Maybelle's Record Shop. Tracy thinks it unfair that after all their hard work, The Corny Collins Show is still segregated. They devise a plan to integrate the show, and Motormouth remembers their long fight for equality ("I Know Where I've Been").

On the day of the Miss Teenage Hairspray competition, Corny Collins starts the show with a song ("(It's) Hairspray"). Amber shows off her talents in a bid to get more votes from the viewers ("Cooties"). As the results are about to be announced, Tracy stuns Amber as she makes her entrance in a magenta dress without any petticoat underneath, taking over the stage, and is joined by Link, Penny, Seaweed, Edna, Wilbur, Little Inez, Corny, and Motormouth. Tracy is declared the winner of the competition. Amber and Velma protest the results, claiming that it is all wrong. Little Inez then tries to take the crown by force when Amber refuses to hand it over, but Tracy stops her, claiming that her heart is set on something more important: Link's and her future. She then proclaims The Corny Collins Show is "now and forevermore" racially integrated, to much applause. When all is announced, Spritzer runs onstage thrilled with the public's response to the telecast, announces that the governor has pardoned Tracy and given her a full college scholarship, and offers Link a recording contract and Velma the position of vice president of Ultra Glow – beauty products for women of color, much to her chagrin. Prudy arrives at the station and, seeing how happy Penny is with Seaweed, accepts her daughter for who she is. At the height of the moment, the company invites Amber and Velma to join the celebration. With the station in joyous celebration, Tracy and Link cement their love with a kiss ("You Can't Stop the Beat").

== Characters ==
Principal roles and casts of major productions of stage productions of Hairspray:

Character	Description	Original Broadway cast	Notable subsequent performers in noteworthy productions
Tracy Turnblad	The female lead of Hairspray. A "pleasantly plump" teenager, who dreams of fame and fights to racially integrate The Corny Collins Show.	Marissa Jaret Winokur	Kathy Brier, Shannon Durig, Marissa Perry, Nikki Blonsky, Leanne Jones, Maddie Baillio, Carmel Rodrigues, Niki Metcalf
Edna Turnblad	Tracy's kind, plus-sized mother – a drag role. Edna runs a laundry business out of her home.	Harvey Fierstein	Michael McKean, Bruce Vilanch, John Pinette, Paul C. Vogt, John Travolta, George Wendt, Michael Ball, Brian Conley, Phill Jupitus, Trevor Ashley, Nina West, Shane Jacobson, Richard Kind
Wilbur Turnblad	Tracy's goofy, loving and encouraging father, who owns the Har-De-Har Hut joke shop and is still madly in love with his wife, Edna. He encourages Tracy to follow her dreams.	Dick Latessa	Jere Burns, Jerry Mathers, Jim J. Bullock, Stephen DeRosa, Christopher Walken, Drew Carey, Mel Smith, Nigel Planer, Micky Dolenz, Grant Piro, Martin Short, Les Dennis, Peter Scolari, Todd McKenney
Motormouth Maybelle	The sassy, strong-willed and friendly owner of a downtown record shop and the host of "Negro Day" on The Corny Collins Show, self-described as "big, blonde and beautiful".	Mary Bond Davis	Darlene Love, Jenifer Lewis, Sharon D Clarke, Queen Latifah, Marisha Wallace, Jennifer Hudson, Asabi Goodman, Siobhan Carter
Velma Von Tussle	The villainess of Hairspray. Amber's scheming mother and producer of The Corny Collins Show, who pushes her daughter to seek the stardom that she never had.	Linda Hart	Liz Larsen, Barbara Walsh, Isabel Keating, Michele Pawk, Mary Birdsong, Karen Mason, Susan Anton, Tracie Bennett, Michelle Pfeiffer, Liz Robertson, Belinda Carlisle, Siobhán McCarthy, Rita Simons, Kristin Chenoweth, Rhonda Burchmore
Corny Collins	The glib, polished host of The Corny Collins Show, with one eye on social progress and another on his hair.	Clarke Thorell	Lance Bass, Jonathan Dokuchitz, James Marsden, John Stamos, Derek Hough, Rob Mills, Bobby Fox
Link Larkin	A teenage heartthrob and one of The Corny Collins Show Council Members, who unexpectedly falls in love with Tracy.	Matthew Morrison	Richard H. Blake, Andrew Rannells, Ashley Parker Angel, Aaron Tveit, Zac Efron, Austin Miller, Nick Jonas, Ben James-Ellis, Jack Chambers, Garrett Clayton, Will Savarese, Nick Cortazzo
Penny Pingleton	Tracy's slightly dorky, devoted and perky best friend who comes from a very strict home life. She has her own love story with Seaweed Stubbs.	Kerry Butler	Jennifer Gambatese, Diana DeGarmo, Caissie Levy, Amanda Bynes, Alexa Vega, Verity Rushworth, Esther Hannaford, Ariana Grande
Seaweed J. Stubbs	A hip and kind-hearted "Negro Day" dancer and the son of Motormouth Maybelle who falls in love with Penny.	Corey Reynolds	Chester Gregory II, Tevin Campbell, Elijah Kelley, Corbin Bleu, Ephraim Sykes, Alan Mingo Jr.
Amber Von Tussle	Bratty, selfish resident princess of The Corny Collins Show, despite her lack of talent. She is willing to do anything to win the Miss Teenage Hairspray pageant.	Laura Bell Bundy	Becky Gulsvig, Haylie Duff, Ashley Spencer, Brittany Snow, Aubrey O'Day, Rachael Wooding, Dove Cameron, Véronique Claveau
Prudy Pingleton / Gym Teacher / Matron	Prudy Pingleton, Penny's overprotective and bigoted mother; the Gym Teacher, and The Matron guarding The Big Dollhouse.	Jackie Hoffman	Julie Halston, Susan Mosher, Allison Janney, Mo Gaffney, Andrea Martin
Harriman F. Spritzer / Principal / Mr. Pinky	Mr. Harriman F. Spritzer, the President of Ultra Clutch; and Principal of Patterson Park High School; Mr. Pinky, owner of Mr. Pinky's Hefty Hideaway who gives Tracy and Edna a makeover.	Joel Vig	Jim J. Bullock, Kevin Meaney, Michael McDonald
Little Inez	Seaweed's talented younger sister.	Danielle Eugenia Wilson	Naturi Naughton, Tayla Parx, Alexandra Slade, Shahadi Wright Joseph

== Songs ==
Act I

- "Good Morning Baltimore" – Tracy and Ensemble
- "The Nicest Kids in Town" – Corny and Council Members
- "Mama, I'm a Big Girl Now" – Edna, Tracy, Prudy, Penny, Velma, Amber, and Female Ensemble
- "I Can Hear the Bells" – Tracy and Ensemble
- "(The Legend of) Miss Baltimore Crabs" – Velma and Council Members
- "The Nicest Kids in Town (Reprise)"† – Corny, Tracy, and Council Members
- "It Takes Two" – Link, Tracy, and Male Ensemble
- "Velma's Revenge"† – Velma
- "Welcome to the 60's" – Tracy, Edna, The Dynamites, Mr. Pinky, and Ensemble
- "Run and Tell That!" – Seaweed, Little Inez, and Motormouth Kids
- "Big, Blonde and Beautiful" – Motormouth, Little Inez, Tracy, Edna, Wilbur, and Ensemble

Act II

- "The Big Dollhouse" – Matron, Edna, Velma, Tracy, Amber, Penny, Motormouth, Little Inez, and Female Ensemble
- "Good Morning Baltimore (Reprise)" – Tracy
- "(You're) Timeless to Me" – Edna and Wilbur
- "(You're) Timeless to Me (Reprise)"† – Edna and Wilbur
- "Without Love" – Tracy, Link, Penny, Seaweed, and Ensemble
- "I Know Where I've Been" – Motormouth and Ensemble
- "(It's) Hairspray" – Corny and Council Members
- "Cooties" – Amber and Council Members
- "You Can't Stop the Beat" – Tracy, Link, Penny, Seaweed, Edna, Wilbur, Motormouth, Velma, Amber, and Company

†Not on the cast recording.

=== Score revisions and additional songs ===
Hairspray went through several revisions during its pre-Broadway run in Seattle, in the process eliminating and replacing several musical numbers. In Seattle, an infomercial about safety on the road titled "Blood on the Pavement" followed "The Nicest Kids in Town", and is included on the cast album following "You Can't Stop the Beat". Early versions of the show featured "Velma's Cha-Cha" and "The Status Quo" (Seattle) (with its short reprise "Rage") during Tracy's audition and dismissal, but the team instead opted for "(The Legend of) Miss Baltimore Crabs". After Tracy's rejection from the Council, there was a scene in the Har-De-Har Hut in which Wilbur tried to cheer Tracy up, singing that "It Doesn't Get Better than This". Later replaced by the similar "Positivity", the scene was cut early in the Seattle tryout as it was deemed emotionally redundant.

After Tracy eventually made it on the show, there was a song, "The New Girl in Town", sung first by the Councilettes and later by the Black girls. Although cut during the Seattle tryout, it was included in the 2007 film and appears in the show's instrumental score. "The Mother-Daughter Cha-Cha-Cha" was another cut number that originally followed "Big, Blonde, and Beautiful". Later, the writers absorbed the protest rally and Mother-Daughter Day into the number, thus deleting the song and folding the sequence into a single scene. A song called "Step on Up" was also cut in favor of "I Know Where I've Been". Early on in the genesis of the show, the plot involved a "Miss Auto Show" competition, as in the 1988 film, instead of "Miss Teenage Hairspray". For this competition, later revised due to the cost of cars onstage, there was a song called "Take a Spin" sung by Corny in the place of "(It's) Hairspray". After Amber's rendition of "Cooties", Tracy had a song before the finale, "It Ain't Over 'Til the Fat Lady Sings", that was cut after readings of the show; it was included as a track on the Special Edition of the 2007 motion picture's soundtrack.

== Instrumentation and chorus ==
Hairspray's orchestration calls for 15 musicians: two keyboards, the first of which is played by the conductor, electric bass, two guitars, drums, percussion, two trumpets, trombone, two woodwind players, two violins, and cello. The guitarists both double on acoustic and electric guitars, with the first playing lead and the second rhythm, and the trumpet doubles on flugelhorn; the original production also featured a piccolo trumpet double during tryouts. The first woodwind player doubles on tenor and alto saxophones and flute. The second woodwind player doubles on tenor, alto, soprano and baritone saxophones and flute, while the backup chorus calls for three males and three females.

In the original Broadway production, a few of the actors mimed on musical instruments in order to fulfil a minimum musician requirement at the Neil Simon Theatre.

Touring productions often use smaller/reduced orchestrations to save on costs – the UK 2017/18 tour which used a 12-piece orchestration – two keyboards (Of which the first is played by the conductor), two guitars, electric bass, drums, percussion, two woodwind players (in which the second one is playing alto, tenor, soprano and baritone saxophones and flute), trombone and two trumpets and a 12-piece background chorus: six males and six females.

== Themes ==
Hairspray explores racial prejudice and freedom of expression. It highlights individuality, and the importance of everyone working together for something to become revolutionary. The musical is empowering, as although it touches on racial issues prevalent in 1960s America, it focuses more on the associated attitudes, and the power we have to change discrimination. The musical encourages individuality, acceptance and freedom. It applies to any social context and time, as it highlights ongoing issues such as fat-shaming, racism and discrimination. It also explores femininity. Notably, Edna Turnblad is performed in drag. Allowing a drag role adds queerness to the musical, which has no gay characters. Edna is considered to be the non-racialized who is part of the story. The musical also challenges societal norms of femininity. Edna's body size emphasizes the show's diva roles. The musical highlights female characters who are strong and associated with diva characteristics.

Hairspray emphasizes issues of acceptance and discrimination within society. Set in the 1960s, it highlights racial discrimination against African-Americans during the Civil Rights Movement, with a focus on popular culture. The Civil Rights Movement gained African-Americans the right to vote, gave them a voice, and introduced freedom for all, but African-Americans still experienced vast inequality during this time. This reality, of the whites holding all institutional and political power, is portrayed in Hairspray in The Corny Collins Show. African-Americans are allowed to dance on the show only once a month, and there is a stereotypical racial representation of dance style. The social representation in Hairspray parallels the reality of the 1960s. By the end of the show, African-Americans are allowed to dance on the show. The show acknowledges the challenges and limitations enforced on African Americans during this time, and reminds audiences of the Civil Rights Movement's achievements. Its message can also be used to empower change for other forms of discrimination relevant in today’s society.

== Response ==
=== Critics ===
According to Variety, Hairspray received 13 favorable and four mixed reviews. In his Variety review, Charles Isherwood wrote: "this sweet, infinitely spirited, bubblegum-flavored confection won't be lacking for buyers any time soon. Arriving in an aerosol fog of advance hype, it more than lives up to its promise." Ben Brantley wrote: "So what if it's more than a little pushy in its social preaching? Stocked with canny, deliriously tuneful songs by Marc Shaiman and Scott Wittman and directed by Jack O'Brien with a common touch that stops short of vulgarity, 'Hairspray' is as sweet as a show can be without promoting tooth decay. ...[it] succeeds in recreating the pleasures of the old-fashioned musical comedy without seeming old-fashioned. ...Shaiman... is taking the infectious hooks and rhythms from period pop and R&B and translating them into the big, bouncy sound that Broadway demands.... And while the savvy arrangements... nod happily to Motown, Elvis, Lesley Gore ballads and standards like 'Higher and Higher', the score's appeal isn't nostalgic. It's music that builds its own self-contained, improbably symmetrical world". New York's Daily News wrote, "As Tracy, Marissa Jaret Winokur has the heft, the pipes and an enormously appealing stage presence. Her dancing may not be as special as the plot suggests, but she wins your heart... With this role, Fierstein places himself in the great line of Broadway divas."

=== Box office and business ===
Hairspray opened with a $12 million advance; after the 2003 Tony Awards, it was expected to do five times the business it normally did on a Monday. The entire $10.5 million investment was recouped by May 2003 (about nine months after it opened on Broadway). In 2002–03 it averaged 99% capacity; in 2007 it averaged 86%.

== Adaptations ==
A film version was released in July 2007. The film was directed and choreographed by Adam Shankman and starred John Travolta as Edna, Christopher Walken as Wilbur, Queen Latifah as Maybelle, Michelle Pfeiffer as Velma, James Marsden as Corny, and Nikki Blonsky as Tracy. Hugh Jackman and Joey McIntyre were also considered to play Corny. NBC's Hairspray Live!, directed by Kenny Leon and Alex Rudzinski, aired in December 2016 to mostly positive reviews.

== Awards and honors ==
=== Original Broadway production ===
Sources: PlaybillVault; Internet Broadway Database; Playbill; DramaCritics.org

Year	Award Ceremony	Category	Nominee	Result
2003	Tony Award	Best Musical		Won
2003	Tony Award	Best Original Score	Marc Shaiman and Scott Wittman	Won
2003	Tony Award	Best Direction of a Musical	Jack O'Brien	Won
2003	Tony Award	Best Book of a Musical	Mark O'Donnell and Thomas Meehan	Won
2003	Tony Award	Best Actor in a Musical	Harvey Fierstein	Won
2003	Tony Award	Best Actress in a Musical	Marissa Jaret Winokur	Won
2003	Tony Award	Best Featured Actor in a Musical	Dick Latessa	Won
2003	Tony Award	Best Featured Actor in a Musical	Corey Reynolds	Nominated
2003	Tony Award	Best Choreography	Jerry Mitchell	Nominated
2003	Tony Award	Best Orchestrations	Harold Wheeler	Nominated
2003	Tony Award	Best Scenic Design	David Rockwell	Nominated
2003	Tony Award	Best Costume Design	William Ivey Long	Won
2003	Tony Award	Best Lighting Design	Kenneth Posner	Nominated
2003	Drama Desk Award	Outstanding Musical		Won
2003	Drama Desk Award	Outstanding Book of a Musical	Mark O'Donnell and Thomas Meehan	Won
2003	Drama Desk Award	Outstanding Orchestrations	Harold Wheeler	Won
2003	Drama Desk Award	Outstanding Actor in a Musical	Harvey Fierstein	Won
2003	Drama Desk Award	Outstanding Actress in a Musical	Marissa Jaret Winokur	Won
2003	Drama Desk Award	Outstanding Featured Actor in a Musical	Dick Latessa	Won
2003	Drama Desk Award	Outstanding Featured Actor in a Musical	Corey Reynolds	Nominated
2003	Drama Desk Award	Outstanding Featured Actress in a Musical	Kerry Butler	Nominated
2003	Drama Desk Award	Outstanding Lyrics	Scott Wittman and Marc Shaiman	Won
2003	Drama Desk Award	Outstanding Music	Marc Shaiman	Won
2003	Drama Desk Award	Outstanding Director	Jack O'Brien	Won
2003	Drama Desk Award	Outstanding Choreography	Jerry Mitchell	Nominated
2003	Drama Desk Award	Outstanding Set Design	David Rockwell	Nominated
2003	Drama Desk Award	Outstanding Costume Design	William Ivey Long	Won
2003	Theatre World Award		Jackie Hoffman	Won
2003	Theatre World Award		Marissa Jaret Winokur	Won
2003	New York Drama Critics' Circle Award	Best Musical	Cy Coleman, David Zippel and Larry Gelbart	Won

=== Original London production ===
Sources: Playbill; Playbill; Olivier Awards The Telegraph

Year	Award Ceremony	Category	Nominee	Result
2008	Laurence Olivier Award	Best New Musical		Won
2008	Laurence Olivier Award	Best Actor in a Musical	Michael Ball	Won
2008	Laurence Olivier Award	Best Actress in a Musical	Leanne Jones	Won
2008	Laurence Olivier Award	Best Performance in a Supporting Role in a Musical	Tracie Bennett	Won
2008	Laurence Olivier Award	Best Performance in a Supporting Role in a Musical	Elinor Collett	Nominated
2008	Laurence Olivier Award	Best Director	Jack O'Brien	Nominated
2008	Laurence Olivier Award	Best Theatre Choreographer	Jerry Mitchell	Nominated
2008	Laurence Olivier Award	Best Set Design	David Rockwell	Nominated
2008	Laurence Olivier Award	Best Costume Design	William Ivey Long	Nominated
2008	Laurence Olivier Award	Best Lighting Design	Kenneth Posner	Nominated
2008	Laurence Olivier Award	Best Sound Design	Steve C. Kennedy	Nominated

== See also ==
- Civil rights movement in popular culture
