= I Can Hear the Bells =

2002 song from the musical Hairspray

Song by Marissa Jaret Winokur

from the album Hairspray
- Released: August 13, 2002
- Genre: Show tune; pop
- Length: 4:04
- Label: Sony Classical
- Composer: Marc Shaiman
- Lyricists: Marc Shaiman; Scott Wittman

"I Can Hear the Bells" is a rock-pop song from the 2002 musical Hairspray. It is sung by the protagonist Tracy Turnblad.

== Production ==
Nikki Blonsky, who plays Tracy Turnblad in the 2007 film, was sick the day the vocals were recorded.

== Synopsis ==
After brushing past Link, the main lead on The Corny Collins Show, Tracy Turnblad starts to dream about what her life would be like if she pursued a relationship with him. These thoughts of a future wedding and perfect romance are idealized.

== Composition ==
Orlando Sentinel notes "the chorus members produce bells whose tinkling emphasizes the dream setting of the song".

== Critical reception ==
Reviewing the 2007 movie, Spirituality and Practice writes "Nikki Blonsky carries the movie on her shoulders and belts out all the power of "I Can Hear the Bells"" Oregon Live notes the song yields a "funny sexual awakening".

Reviewing a live performance, Variety said "“I Can Hear the Bells,” the fantasy ballet in which Tracy seduces and weds Link to the sound of rhythmic chiming, is performed with winking brio and remains a comic highlight of the first act." Broadway World described it as "lovelorn", and Theatre Mirror deemed it "a fall in love at first sight love song". Hoopla Now described it as "love-struck", while MC Theatre Guide named it "lovesick" and Shropshire Star called it a "love-struck ballad". It has also been described as an "anthem", a "heartfelt solo", and "dreamy".

DC Metro Theatre Arts wrote, "Tracy fantasizes about getting married to the local heartthrob in a dream sequence that is both beautifully romantic and hysterically funny." Edge Boston called it a "fun, slyly comic number". The Public Reviews wrote "I Can Hear the Bells is a cute reflection of every teenage girls inner mind when faced with the school heart throb".
