= Marissa Jaret Winokur =

American actress

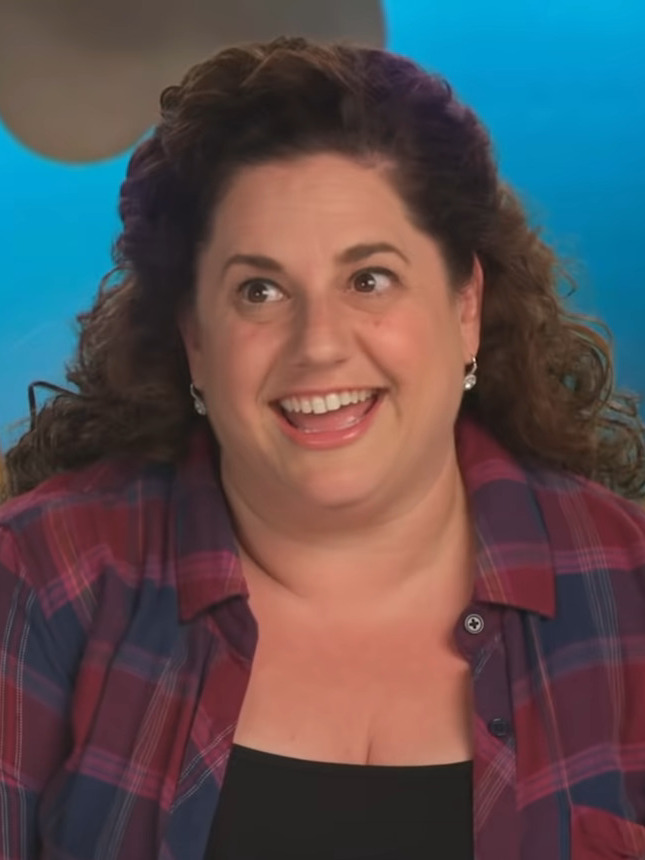
- Winokur in 2020
- Born: February 2, 1973 (age 53); New York City, U.S.
- Other name: Marissa Winokur
- Occupation: Actress
- Years active: 1993–present
- Spouse: Judah Miller (m. 2006)
- Children: 1

Marissa Jaret Winokur (born February 2, 1973), sometimes credited as Marissa Winokur, is an American actress and singer known for her Tony-winning performance as Tracy Turnblad in the Broadway musical Hairspray, an adaptation of John Waters's film, as well as her work on the Pamela Anderson sitcom Stacked. Some of her other TV credits include Curb Your Enthusiasm, Moesha, The Steve Harvey Show, Just Shoot Me!, Felicity and Dharma & Greg.

She was a contestant on the popular reality competition series Dancing with the Stars and went on to host the similar Dance Your Ass Off. From 2010-2011 she served as a co-host on the daily daytime talk show The Talk, ultimately leaving to focus on her clothing line and a new cable TV show. The cable TV show in question, when it premiered, proved to be a late-night talk show titled All About Sex, whose co-hosting duties she shared with Margaret Cho, Heather McDonald, and Dr. Tiffanie Davis Henry, which aired on TLC at 11:00 PM Eastern time on Saturday nights.

In 2018, Winokur participated in the first American season of Celebrity Big Brother, where she was crowned the winner.

== Early life and education ==
Winokur was born in New York City, the daughter of Maxine, a teacher, and Michael Winokur, an architect. She is Jewish. Winokur was a cheerleader and captain of her high school soccer team at Fox Lane High School in Bedford, New York. She graduated from the American Musical and Dramatic Academy in 1993.

== Career ==
=== Stage, screen and television ===
Winokur won the 2003 Tony Award for Best Leading Actress in a Musical, Drama Desk Award, Theatre World Award, and Outer Critics Circle Award for her performance in Hairspray. She had previously appeared on Broadway as Jan in the 1994 revival of Grease.

Winokur has also played roles in films such as American Beauty, Never Been Kissed, Teaching Mrs. Tingle, Scary Movie, Beautiful Girl (for ABC Family), Fever Pitch, and she provided one of the voices in Shrek the Halls.

Winokur co-starred in the TV series Stacked, which starred Pamela Anderson. She also appeared on an episode of Curb Your Enthusiasm (Season 1, Episode 5) where she lost a physical fight with Larry David over the first appointment at a doctor's office. She was called "Marissa Winokur" in the episode, but was credited simply as "Woman In Elevator." She played the role of Theresa Loman on the UPN top-hit series, Moesha, as Brandy Norwood’s roommate.

She was set to star in a new comedy pilot for CBS titled Fugly, from Greg Garcia, the creator of My Name Is Earl. The show was originally pitched to Fox as a vehicle for Pamela Anderson.

She returned to Hairspray on December 9, 2008, and played Tracy until the show's closing on January 4, 2009.

Winokur hosted the reality competition series Dance Your Ass Off on the Oxygen Network. In October 2010 she joined Julie Chen, Holly Robinson Peete, Sharon Osbourne, Leah Remini, and Sara Gilbert in a new talk show, The Talk, that was intended to focus on stories of parenting, everyday life and events in the headlines. The program began airing on CBS on October 18, 2010. On January 14, 2011, she announced via People Magazine that she would leave The Talk to focus on her clothing line and a new cable TV show she was developing.

She reprised the role of Tracy Turnblad in the Hollywood Bowl production of Hairspray, which ran from August 5–7, 2011. She also had a role in Broadway's Grease.

Winokur joined the cast of TV Land's original sitcom Retired at 35, beginning in the second season. She acted out the role of Amy, David’s sister, a sharp-tongued, quick-witted successful saleswoman for a pharmaceutical company with a bubbly personality. The character was originated by Casey Wilson in the show's pilot, but made no other Season 1 appearances.

In 2017, Winokur competed with her son Zev on Big Star Little Star, a U.S. version of the British game show Big Star's Little Star.

In 2018, Winokur was cast as one of the houseguests on the first American edition of Celebrity Big Brother. She won Celebrity Big Brother over Ross Mathews on February 25, 2018, by a vote of 6-3. She also hosted Off the Block with Ross and Marissa on Facebook Watch.

In 2025, she’s returning to the stage in Bat Boy: The Musical as Mrs. Taylor at New York City Center, Off-Broadway.

=== Recording and voice work ===
Winokur was working on recording a children's music album. Her rendition of the song "Baby Face" was featured on the soundtrack for the film Son of the Mask, and she performed "The Wish Song" on the 2006 charity album Unexpected Dreams – Songs From the Stars. In 2007, she joined Nikki Blonsky and Ricki Lake in singing "Mama, I'm a Big Girl Now" on the Hairspray soundtrack; in director John Waters's original film, Lake had originated the role that Winokur (on stage) and Blonsky (on screen, in the film version of the musical) had respectively reprised, that of Tracy Turnblad.

Winokur has also lent her voice to several cartoon shows, including American Dad! and King of the Hill.

=== Dancing with the Stars ===
Winokur was featured on Season 6 of Dancing with the Stars with professional dancer Tony Dovolani. Marissa scored an 18 for her Cha-Cha-Cha her first week and 21 for her Quickstep in week two giving her a combined total of 39 out of 60. In that week's elimination, Marissa was the last female contestant to be saved before Monica Seles was eliminated. In week three, Marissa scored 19 for her Jive to Avril Lavigne's "Girlfriend," placing her last on the leader board, but was saved from elimination by the viewer's votes. In week four, Marissa performed a Paso Doble and was praised for her improvements, scoring 24 out of 30. She scored a second 24 out of 30 for her Samba in week five. In week six, Marissa earned a 26 for a Viennese Waltz, her highest score so far. The following week was another success learning two dances, scoring a 27 for her Tango in the Ballroom round and in the Latin round she received 25 for her Rumba. Marissa came third on the combined total leader board with a score of 52 out of 60, beating Shannon Elizabeth and Mario by one point and Cristian de la Fuente by 6 points. Despite being third, however, Marissa found herself in the bottom two alongside Shannon. The following week Marissa performed a Foxtrot and Mambo scoring 25 for both dances scoring a total of 50 out of 60, placing her last on the leader board, but was again saved by the viewer's votes. During her last week on the show, she earned a 26 for both her Rumba and Quickstep. Winokur was eliminated after the semifinal round.

==== Performances ====
| Week # | Dance/Song | Judges' score | | | Result |
| Week # | Dance/Song | Inaba | Goodman | Tonioli | Result |
| 1 | Cha-cha-cha/"Low" | 6 | 6 | 6 | N/A |
| 2 | Quickstep/"Flip, Flop and Fly" | 7 | 7 | 7 | Last to be called safe |
| 3 | Jive/"Girlfriend" | 6 | 7 | 6 | Safe |
| 4 | Paso Doble/"My Family Is My Life" | 8 | 8 | 8 | Safe |
| 5 | Samba/"Tambourine" | 8 | 8 | 8 | Safe |
| 6 | Viennese Waltz/"Delilah" | 9 | 8 | 9 | Safe |
| 7 | Tango/"Champagne Tango"; Rumba/"Quando, Quando, Quando" | 9; 9 | 9; 8 | 9; 8 | Bottom Two |
| 8 | Foxtrot/"New York, New York"; Mambo/"Ritmo De Chunga" | 9; 8 | 8; 8 | 8; 9 | Safe |
| 9 Semi-finals | Quickstep/"Around the World"; Rumba/"Just the Two of Us" | 9; 8 | 9; 9 | 8; 9 | Eliminated |

== Personal life ==
During the early development stages of Hairspray, Winokur was diagnosed with cervical cancer. She underwent treatment for the disease, without revealing her condition to anyone except her immediate family out of fear that she would be replaced in the musical. Ultimately she made a full recovery and remained in the show.

On October 7, 2006, Winokur married longtime boyfriend Judah Miller (brother to Murray Miller), who was a writer on Stacked. In March 2008, the couple announced that they were expecting their first child, a boy to be named Zev, via a gestational surrogate. Zev Isaac Miller was born July 22, 2008, weighing in at 8 pounds 7 ounces and measured 21 inches long. Winokur and Miller helped deliver their son.

She is the great-niece of two famous American writers: S. J. Perelman and Nathanael West.

== Filmography ==
=== Film ===
| Year | Title | Role | Notes |
|---|---|---|---|
| 1999 | Never Been Kissed | Sheila | |
| 1999 | Teaching Mrs. Tingle | Student | Uncredited |
| 1999 | American Beauty | Mr. Smiley's Senior Drive-thru Manager (Janine) | |
| 2000 | Scary Movie | Tina the day player victim in the garage | |
| 2001 | Amy's Orgasm | Radio P.A. | |
| 2002 | Now You Know | Lea's Friend | |
| 2005 | Fever Pitch | Sarah | |
| 2014 | Muffin Top: A Love Story | Elise | |
| 2018 | A Very Nutty Christmas | Rosa | |
| 2019 | Trouble | Claire (voice) | |
| 2020 | Feel the Beat | Herself | |

=== Television ===
| Year | Title | Role | Notes |
|---|---|---|---|
| 1995 | Step by Step | Dork Dancer | |
| 1998 | The Steve Harvey Show | Kimmie | |
| 1998 | Malibu, CA | Melody | |
| 1999 | Honey, I Shrunk the Kids: The TV Show | Glenda | |
| 1999 | Get Real | Annie | |
| 1999 | Felicity | Nancy | |
| 1999 | City Guys | Marcy Lake | |
| 1999–2000 | Dharma & Greg | Anita | |
| 2000 | Chicken Soup for the Soul | Bella | |
| 2000 | Moesha | Theresa Loman | |
| 2000 | Curb Your Enthusiasm | Woman in Elevator | |
| 2000 | Just Shoot Me! | Dee Dee | |
| 2001 | Nikki | Lizzy | |
| 2001 | The Ellen Show | Tina | |
| 2001 | Boston Public | Courtney Schaffer | |
| 2003 | Beautiful Girl | Becca Wasserman | |
| 2004 | Good Girls Don't... | Mistress Persephone | |
| 2005 | Higglytown Heroes | Taxi Driver Hero (voice) | |
| 2005 | Jack & Bobby | Margaret | |
| 2005–2006 | Stacked | Katrina | |
| 2005–2018 | American Dad! | Various voices | |
| 2007 | Shrek the Halls | Bookstore Clerk (voice) | |
| 2007–2008 | King of the Hill | Various voices | |
| 2010 | RuPaul's Drag Race | Guest Judge | |
| 2010–2011 | The Talk | Herself | |
| 2011 | The Cleveland Show | Full-Sized Woman (voice) | |
| 2011 | Shake It Up | Ms. Nancy | |
| 2011 | Hot in Cleveland | Kim | |
| 2011–2012 | Yo Gabba Gabba! | Barbara | |
| 2012 | Retired at 35 | Amy Robbins | |
| 2012 | Guys with Kids | Linda Allmendinger | |
| 2013 | Bubble Guppies | Ms. Jenny (voice) | |
| 2013 | Major Crimes | Karaoke Singer | |
| 2013–2014 | Melissa & Joey | Theresa | |
| 2014 | CSI: Crime Scene Investigation | Principal Dawn Meadows | |
| 2014–2015 | Playing House | Candy | |
| 2016 | Scream Queens | Shelly | |
| 2016 | Hairspray Live! | Pinkette | |
| 2016 | Not Today Bianca | Becky | |
| 2017 | Girls | Patty | |
| 2018 | Celebrity Big Brother (American TV series) | Herself (Contestant) | (winner) |
| 2018 | The Bold and the Beautiful | Wedding Planner | |
| 2018–2019 | A Million Little Things | Linda | |
| 2018–2019 | Crashing | Guinevere | |
| 2019 | The Goldbergs | Eileen Leffler | |
| 2019 | Liza on Demand | Herself | |
| 2019 | Perfect Harmony | Barb | |
| 2020–2022 | What We Do in the Shadows | Charmaine | 6 episodes |

== Awards and nominations ==
| Year | Award | Category | Work | Result |
|---|---|---|---|---|
| 2003 | Tony Award | Best Actress in a Musical | Hairspray | Won |
| 2003 | Drama Desk Award | Outstanding Actress in a Musical | Hairspray | Won |
| 2003 | Drama League Award | Distinguished Performance | Hairspray | Nominated |
| 2003 | Outer Critics Circle Award | Outstanding Actress in a Musical | Hairspray | Won |
| 2003 | Theatre World Award | | Hairspray | Honoree |

Media offices
| First | The Talk co-host 2010 | Incumbent |
