= You Can't Stop the Beat =

Song by the Hairspray cast

from the album Hairspray
- Released: 2002
- Genre: Show tune
- Length: 5:24
- Songwriters: Scott Wittman; Marc Shaiman

"You Can't Stop The Beat" is the finale number in the 2002 musical Hairspray. It is sung by Tracy, Link, Penny, Seaweed, Edna, Motor Mouth, Velma, and Amber with Corny and Wilbur as backing singers. Although the lyrics touch on sizeism and racism, the song also references broader themes of change and progression. The song pays tribute to the Phil Spector-produced 1966 Ike & Tina Turner hit "River Deep – Mountain High". Members of the Hairspray Live! cast have lovingly mocked the song as "You Can't Stop to Breathe", in reference to the song and accompanying choreography being considerably high energy and difficult.

== Production ==
The song was edited for the 2007 film. Notably the Von Tussle section was removed. It was shot however, and is featured as a bonus feature on the DVD.

== Critical reception ==
The New York Times deemed it a "contagiously elating finale". Reviewing the stage show, the Leicester Mercury described the song as "infectiously catchy" and added "you can't fail to leave singing You Can't Stop The Beat". The Boston Globe called it "the show's splashy closing number", The Boston Herald deemed it "joyous", In Newsweekly described it as "the fabulous ensemble closing number", and Theatre Mirror noted "you won't be able to stop your feet from stomping out the rhythm". The Sun Southwestern College said ""You Can't Stop the Beat" was so high energy it seemed the cast had drained the espresso machine. It left the audience exhausted". NY Magazine called it a "boisterous finale", Spark Sunderland named it "famous", while Plays in the Park dubbed it the "show's anthem". Joyce's Choices said the song was "jubilant...one of my all time favorite affirmations and musical numbers". 99.9 Kez said " You Can't Stop the Beat is the ultimate infectious show closer, designed to have you leaving the theatre wishing every musical ended with such an up-beat, high-energy song and dance.

Reviewing a 2014 production, Hoopla wrote "The show's finale, "You Can't Stop the Beat," was just a little shaky at first. The younger principles weren't synced on the choreography and did not all belt out the song with the required verve. But after a bit of plot was taken care of, Holmes and Watkins took their turns center stage on the song and showed everyone how it's done. Once the whole cast joined in, the joyous singing and dancing was infectious, bringing the show to its rousing, moving conclusion." Spirituality and Practice said "Hairspray is blessed with a vibrant vitality in song and dance that just doesn't stop from the opening to the film's finale "You Can't Stop the Beat.""

=== Awards ===
The People's Choice Award for "Favorite Song from a Soundtrack" was given to the Hairspray cast for "You Can't Stop the Beat". The cover from the 2016 live version of the musical was nominated for "Best Musical Moment" at the 2017 MTV Movie & TV awards.

== Charts ==
Chart (2007)	Peak position
Australia (ARIA Charts)	69
