= I Know Where I've Been =

2002 song from the musical Hairspray

"I Know Where I've Been" is a gospel-style, soul song from the 2002 musical Hairspray, performed by "Motormouth" Maybelle as she leads a protest for racial equality through the streets of Baltimore.

== Critical reception ==
The song is regarded by critics as the most serious in the production, examining themes of past struggle and future resolution. It received acclaim from audiences and critics alike. Reviewing a stage version, Broadway World wrote "When the fabulous Arthella Williams' "Maybelle" brings down the house with the show's one genuinely serious song "I Know Where I've Been," the audience is already being prepped for a standing ovation." In other stage musical reviews, CurtainUp notes "Inga Ballard as "Motormouth" Maybelle, stops the show with "I Know Where I've Been", while MD Theatre Guide writes "Aaliyah Dixon's voice soared to phenomenal heights in the tearjerker, "I Know Where I've Been" drawing the audience to roaring applause". Catholic News explains "Maybelle's stirring civil rights number -- "I Know Where I've Been"—is sung during a torch-lit protest march to the TV station and provides the film's most serious, genuinely moving sequence."

RationalMusic wrote "The song "I Know Where I've Been" is very pretty, but its slow and serious tone is jarring after the frivolity of the rest of the score. Also, is there some unwritten rule that says that if a show has black characters, they have to sing a gospel-style or religious song? " It has been described as "anthemic", "a power ballad about the struggles of racism", "one of the film's true highlights", and the "rousing, showstopper act two song". VeniceStage writes "Despite all the fun and fluff of hairspray, that message of tolerance and acceptance is one that hits home without preachiness." SparksUnderland wrote "The soul gospel filled number, 'I Know Where I've Been', seemed to raise the hairs on the back of my neck along with every other audience member there." A series of reviews compiled by NMST described the song as "soulful", a "powerful gospel-like blues ballad", "spiritual", "dramatic", and "knockout anthem".
