= (The Legend of) Miss Baltimore Crabs =

Song from 2002 musical Hairspray

"(The Legend of) Miss Baltimore Crabs" is a song from the 2002 musical Hairspray. It is sung by Velma Von Tussle, the producer of The Corny Collins Show.

== Synopsis ==
Velma Von Tussle recounts how she won a beauty pageant when she was younger, which she clearly considers to be her proudest moment. Velma recounts her tales of sleeping to the top and not being afraid to play dirty. She later interrogates Tracy, eventually kicking her out of The Corny Collins Show audition.

== Analysis ==
DVDTalk wrote "Other songs help flesh out characters that have been changed from the film. 'The Legend of Miss Baltimore Crabs' gives Velma Von Tussle additional motivation, background and a reason to be bad while still advancing the plot. Since her character is something of a composite from the film (she combines the characters played by Debbie Harry, Mink Stole, and Sonny Bono), she becomes much richer and funnier."

== Critical reception ==
Reviewing a stage production, Curtain Up wrote "Van Cleave is a powerhouse recounting "The Legend of Miss Baltimore Crabs"". Reviewing the film, BBC wrote "Michelle Pfeiffer is deliciously icy as scheming TV mogul Velma Von Tusselle, cha-cha-cha-ing in ("The Legend of) Miss Baltimore Crabs".". Reviewing a stage version, Drew Sterwald of The News-Press commented "Tracy's nemesis...really sinks her teeth into the rotten role and delivers a show-stopping solo, "(The Legend of) Miss Baltimore Crabs"". IBJ noted that one performer "turns what the one-note evil TV producer Velma von Tussle and her "(The Legend of) Miss Baltimore Crabs" number into a show highlight." Reviewing a 90 minute intermissionless version performed in Las Vegas, TheaterMania wrote "The only other two numbers to be cut completely, "(The Legend of) Miss Baltimore Crabs" and "Cooties," aren't missed at all; the first is the closest thing to a clinker in the show, an uninspired attempt to musicalize the comic villainess Velma Von Tussle". CinePhillyist described it as "Michelle Pfeiffer's funny and more than a little dirty [number]". Similarly, EY Jacksonville called it "one of the funniest numbers in the show". IndyWeek commented "This show that features a number titled "The Legend of Miss Baltimore Crabs" had earned a standing ovation from a room ranging from children to the elderly. That's an achievement that Waters himself would approve." Reviewing Pfeiffer's performance in the 2007 film, Phawker wrote "Her fab rendition...commands your attention. Keeping Up With NX said "we even get so see Velma in all her crowning glory with the hilarious '(The Legend of) Miss Baltimore Crabs.'".
