= Hairspray (1988 film) =

Film by John Waters

- Theatrical release poster
- Directed by: John Waters
- Written by: John Waters
- Produced by: Rachel Talalay; John Waters
- Starring: Sonny Bono; Ruth Brown; Divine; Debbie Harry; Ricki Lake; Jerry Stiller; Ric Ocasek; Pia Zadora
- Cinematography: David Insley
- Edited by: Janice Hampton
- Music by: Kenny Vance
- Production companies: Stanley F. Buchthal; Robert Shaye Production
- Distributed by: New Line Cinema
- Release dates: February 16, 1988 (Baltimore); February 26, 1988
- Running time: 92 minutes
- Country: United States
- Language: English
- Budget: $2.7 million
- Box office: $8.3 million

Hairspray is a 1988 American independent comedy film written and directed by John Waters, starring Sonny Bono, Ruth Brown, Divine, Debbie Harry, Ricki Lake in her film debut, and Jerry Stiller, with special appearances by Ric Ocasek and Pia Zadora. Hairspray was a dramatic departure from Waters's earlier works, with a much broader intended audience. Hairspray's PG is the least restrictive rating a Waters film has received; most of his previous films were rated X by the MPAA. Set in 1962 Baltimore, Maryland, the film revolves around self-proclaimed "pleasantly plump" teenager Tracy Turnblad as she pursues stardom as a dancer on a local TV show and rallies against the TV show's racial segregation.

Hairspray was a moderate success upon its initial theatrical release, earning $8 million. However, it managed to attract a larger audience on home video in the early 1990s. The film received critical acclaim and ranks at No. 444 on Empire magazine's 2008 list of the 500 greatest films of all time. This is Divine's final film released during his lifetime; he died three weeks after its release.

In 2002, the film was adapted into a Broadway musical of the same name, which won eight Tony Awards, including Best Musical in 2003. A second film version of Hairspray, an adaptation of the stage musical, was also released by New Line Cinema in 2007, which included many changes of scripted items from the original. In 2022, the film was selected for preservation in the United States National Film Registry by the Library of Congress as being "culturally, historically, or aesthetically significant".

== Plot ==
In 1962 Baltimore, overweight teenager Tracy Turnblad dreams of appearing on The Corny Collins Show, (Note: The Corny Collins Show is based on the real-life Buddy Deane Show.) a popular local television program featuring a "council" of teenagers dancing to popular songs. One night, she and her best friend Penny Pingleton sneak out to a record hop emceed by the show's host Corny Collins. Though the event is segregated, she impresses guest judge Motormouth Maybelle Stubbs, who co-hosts the program's monthly "Negro Day".

Tracy and her partner Fender win that night's dance contest, narrowly beating council dancers Link Larkin and his girlfriend Amber Von Tussle, the show's reigning queen and a mean, conventionally attractive high school classmate whose racist parents, Velma and Franklin, own Tilted Acres Amusement Park which bans African Americans. Corny invites Tracy to audition for his program at the WZZT television studio the next day, inspiring her to bleach, tease, and rat her big hair. At the audition, Penny nervously stumbles over her answers, and another girl is cut for being black. Tracy's dance moves and stellar performance during the "mock interview" challenge earn her a spot on the council, beginning with that afternoon's taping. After mocking Tracy's weight, Amber is suspended for the day by Corny.

Having previously disapproved of her daughter's hairstyle and incessant obsession, Tracy's slightly overbearing and equally overweight mother Edna eventually revels in her daughter's newfound fame and takes her shopping at Hefty Hideaway, a clothing store for plus-size women. The owner, Mr. Pinky, recognizes Tracy and hires her as his model. At school, Tracy is sent to the principal's office for violating the student hairstyle policy; the principal then assigns her to special education classes, where she befriends black classmates who have been sent there to be held back academically.

Tracy and Link fall in love as she competes for the title of Miss Auto Show 1963, fuelling Amber's jealousy towards her. Later, Tracy, Penny, and Link are invited to Maybelle's R&B record shop on North Avenue, where the trio meet Maybelle's daughter, Li'l Inez, and learn dance moves such as "The Bird" and "The Dirty Boogie". Penny begins an interracial romance with Maybelle's son Seaweed, horrifying her parents, Prudy and Paddy, who imprison her in her bedroom and hire quack psychiatrist Dr. Fredrickson to brainwash her into only dating white boys.

Undeterred, Tracy uses her newfound fame to advocate for racial integration. Meanwhile, Maybelle organizes a protest at Tilted Acres as Corny hosts a live special taping, during which Amber falsely claims that Tracy's hairdo is infested with cockroaches. Both black and white protestors storm the park, inciting a race riot that interrupts the taping; Tracy is arrested, Link is severely assaulted, and the Von Tussles' opposition to racial integration increases. Later, Seaweed, who was also wounded during the riot, helps Penny break out of her house and escape from her parents, who furiously disown her.

Corny hosts another special broadcast at the Miss Auto Show 1963 pageant, but Tracy is unable to attend as she is stuck in reform school, while Link is now using a wheelchair. Franklin conceals a bomb in Velma's towering bouffant wig, planning for her to throw the bomb should Amber lose. Meanwhile, Maybelle and Li'l Inez handcuff themselves to the Governor of Maryland, refusing to leave until he frees Tracy. When Miss Auto Show is announced, WZZT station manager Arvin Hodgepile reveals that although Tracy is technically the winner, she has been disqualified, and Amber is crowned instead.

As Amber celebrates her victory, the governor simultaneously exonerates Tracy, who ventures to the pageant. Disregarding Arvin's mandate, Corny announces the show is now integrated, after which Tracy changes into a dress painted with roaches and introduces a dance called "The Bug", with Link standing up from his wheelchair to join her. As Li'l Inez confiscates Amber's crown, the bomb in Velma's wig spontaneously detonates and the burning hairpiece lands on Amber's head, thwarting the Von Tussles' sabotage plot. The police arrest both Franklin and Velma. Tracy claims her rightful crown and encourages everyone to dance.

== Cast ==
- Sonny Bono as Franklin Von Tussle, Velma's husband and Amber's father
- Ruth Brown as Motormouth Maybelle Stubbs, a friendly and strong-willed African American and mother of Seaweed and Li'l Inez
- Divine as Edna Turnblad, Tracy's kind, heavy-set mother who is ashamed of her obesity and as WZZT station manager Arvin Hodgepile, who is against racial integration for his studio
- Debbie Harry as Velma Von Tussle, Franklin's wife and Amber's mother
- Ricki Lake as Tracy Turnblad, an optimistic, aspirational teenager who hopes to dance on a TV show as well as promote integration
- Jerry Stiller as Wilbur Turnblad, Tracy's loving, funny and encouraging father
- Colleen Fitzpatrick as Amber Von Tussle, a snobby dancer on The Corny Collins Show
- Michael St. Gerard as Lincoln "Link" Larkin, a teenage heartthrob, Tracy's boyfriend, and Amber's ex-boyfriend
- Leslie Ann Powers as Penelope "Penny" Pingleton, Tracy's shy best friend
- Clayton Prince as Seaweed J. Stubbs, Motormouth Maybelle's son who loves to dance, and Penny's main love interest
- Mink Stole as Tammy Turner, an employee and personal assistant to Corny Collins
- Shawn Thompson as Corny Collins, the host of The Corny Collins Show
- Jo Ann Havrilla as Prudence "Prudy" Pingleton, Paddy's wife and Penny's overprotective, controlling mother who disapproves of Penny dating Seaweed
- Alan Wendl as Mr. Pinky, the owner of the Hefty Hideaway clothing store
- Cyrkle Milbourne as Li'l Inez Stubbs, Seaweed's younger sister
- Doug Roberts as Patrick "Paddy" Pingleton, Prudy's husband and Penny's no-nonsense father who wants to protect Penny from Seaweed
- John Waters as Dr. Fredrickson, a quack psychiatrist who helps Prudy and Paddy try to brainwash Penny into only dating white boys
- Toussaint McCall as himself (though appearing as a man in his late 40s, rather than in his early 20s, as he would have been in 1962)
- Leo Rocca as the Governor of Maryland

Council members

- Josh A. Charles as Iggy
- Jason Downs as Bobby
- Holter Ford Graham as I.Q. Jones
- Dan Griffith as Brad
- Regina Hammond as Pam
- Bridget Kimsey as Consuella
- Frankie Maldon as Dash
- Brooke Mills as Lou Ann Levorowski
- John Orofino as Fender
- Kim Webb as Carmelita
- Debra Wirth as Shelly

Special appearances

- Ric Ocasek as the beatnik cat
- Pia Zadora as the beatnik chick
- Buddy Deane as a newsman at the Governor's Mansion

== Production ==
=== Development ===
Waters wrote the screenplay under the title of White Lipstick, with the story loosely based on real events. The Corny Collins Show is based on the real-life Buddy Deane Show, a local dance party program which pre-empted Dick Clark's American Bandstand in the Baltimore area during the 1950s and early 1960s. Waters had previously written about The Buddy Deane Show in his 1986 book Crackpot: The Obsessions of John Waters.

=== Filming ===
Principal photography took place in and around the Baltimore area during the summer of 1987. The school scenes were shot at Perry Hall High School, with set locations including the library, a first-floor English class and the principal's office. In the principal's office, the Harry Dorsey Gough (see Perry Hall Mansion) coat-of-arms that once hung in the main lobby can be seen through the doorway. Tilted Acres amusement park was Dorney Park & Wildwater Kingdom in Allentown, Pennsylvania.

According to Harry, Waters wanted her to not only act but also perform music for the film, but her record label Sire objected.

Hairspray was Divine's final film to be released in his lifetime; he died on March 7, 1988, three weeks after the film's premiere and nine days after the film's release. Hairspray was his only film with Waters in which he did not play the lead. Originally, Divine was considered to play both Tracy and Edna. Executives from New Line Cinema, the film's distributor, discouraged this concept, and it was dropped. Instead, Divine played Edna Turnblad and Arvin Hodgepile, the racist TV station manager.

=== Deleted scenes ===
A handful of scenes were cut while in post-production, some of which provide context for certain plot developments seen in the finished film.

The first occurs before Tracy and Penny go the Parkville VFW record hop. Tracy is required to start her first shift working in the Hardy-Har Joke Shop, but after managing to chase away all her customers, she is excused to go to the hop. The joke shop customers are still listed in the end credits of the final cut.

An additional removal shows Tracy skipping school, stealing shoes from the Etta Gown Shop, breaking into the Von Tussles' home, and using a bottle of Amber's peroxide to bleach her hair in Amber's sink, thus explaining Tracy's subsequent change of hair color when she auditions for Corny Collins.

Another deleted scene involved cockroaches being placed in Tracy's hair. Although removed prior to release, numerous references remain in the final edit, including the songs "The Roach" (1961) by Gene and Wendell and "The Bug" (1958) by Jerry Dallman and the Knightcaps, as well as Tracy arriving to be crowned "Miss Auto Show" wearing an evening gown painted with black cockroaches. When discussing his decision to ultimately cut the scene, Waters explained, "Bob Shaye, the head of New Line, probably correctly, said 'This doesn't work. What is this, a Buñuel movie?'...And he was probably right."

The final deleted scene was a musical number which depicted the teens performing an obscure 1960s dance called "The Stupidity" at the auto show just before Tracy's being released from reform school, but again, Waters ultimately decided it was not appropriate, stating, "I thought, you know, you don't want your leading man to look stupid right in the big finale."

== Reception ==
=== Box office ===
Hairspray opened on February 26, 1988, in 79 North American theaters, where it grossed $577,287 in its opening weekend. On March 11, it expanded to 227 theaters, where it grossed $966,672 from March 11–13. It ended its theatrical run with $8,271,108.

=== Critical response ===
Hairspray received two out of four from Gene Siskel but three out of four from Roger Ebert.

On the review aggregator website Rotten Tomatoes, the film holds an approval rating of 98% based on 46 reviews, with an average rating of 7.9/10. It is Waters's second-highest-rated film (behind Multiple Maniacs) on the website. The website's critics consensus reads, "Hairspray is perhaps John Waters' most accessible film, and as such, it's a gently subversive slice of retro hilarity." Metacritic, which uses a weighted average, assigned the film a score of 77 out of 100, based on 14 reviews, indicating "generally favorable" reviews. Waters wrote that his all-time favorite review of Hairspray was David Edelstein's in Rolling Stone: "A family movie both the Bradys and the Mansons could adore".

=== Accolades ===
The film was nominated for six Independent Spirit Awards, and the Grand Jury Prize at the Sundance Film Festival.

== Other works ==
=== Broadway musical ===
In mid-2002, Margo Lion teamed with writers Marc Shaiman and Thomas Meehan to turn Hairspray into a Broadway musical. The show opened on August 15, 2002, starring Marissa Jaret Winokur as Tracy and Harvey Fierstein as Edna. The show won eight Tony Awards, including Best Musical, in 2003. The show closed on January 4, 2009.

=== 2007 film adaptation ===
In 2006, New Line Cinema joined forces with Adam Shankman to adapt the Broadway show into a movie musical. The film was released July 20, 2007, starring John Travolta as Edna, Michelle Pfeiffer as Velma, Christopher Walken as Wilbur, Amanda Bynes as Penny Pingleton, Brittany Snow as Amber Von Tussle, Queen Latifah as Motormouth Maybelle, James Marsden as Corny, Zac Efron as Link, and newcomer Nikki Blonsky as Tracy. The film had a $75 million budget and earned over $200 million worldwide.

=== 2016 live television adaptation ===
NBC aired a television event of the acclaimed musical on December 7, 2016, starring Harvey Fierstein as Edna, Ariana Grande as Penny Pingleton, Kristin Chenoweth as Velma, Martin Short as Wilbur, Dove Cameron as Amber Von Tussle, Jennifer Hudson as Motormouth Maybelle, Derek Hough as Corny, Garrett Clayton as Link, and newcomer Maddie Baillio as Tracy. It was well received by critics and was seen by 9.05 million viewers, with a ratings share of 2.3 in the 18–49 demographic, and a 5.9 overnight household rating.

== Soundtrack ==
The soundtrack was released in 1988 by MCA Records. The album featured one original song by Rachel Sweet and eleven other songs mostly from the early 1960s by Gene Pitney, Toussaint McCall and The Ikettes, and others. Two songs, "You Don't Own Me" and "Mama Didn't Lie", came out in 1963; "Nothing Takes the Place of You" was released in 1967.

== Home media ==
Hairspray was issued for the first time on VHS and LaserDisc in 1989 by RCA/Columbia Pictures Home Video. New Line reissued the film on VHS in 1996.

The film was released on DVD by New Line in 2002, with an audio commentary by Waters and Lake, and a theatrical trailer. It was released on Blu-ray on March 4, 2014.

On June 23, 2026, The Criterion Collection released the film on Blu-ray and Ultra HD Blu-ray (along with Waters' 1977 film Desperate Living), featuring a new 4K restoration.

== See also ==
- Civil rights movement in popular culture
- Cross-dressing in film and television
- List of cult films
