= Step Up (franchise) =

American dance drama multi-media franchise

- Official franchise logo, as released in 2020.
- Created by: Duane Adler
- Original work: Step Up (2006)
- Owner: Lionsgate Studios
- Years: 2006–present

Films and television
- Film(s): List of films
- Television series: Step Up: High Water (2018–2022)

Audio
- Soundtrack(s): Step Up (2006); Step Up 2: The Streets (2008); Step Up 3D (2010); Step Up Revolution (2012); Step Up: All In (2014)

Step Up is an American romantic dance franchise created by Duane Adler and owned by Lionsgate Studios. The franchise includes five films, a Chinese spin-off film and a television series. The films have received a generally mixed critical reception, while being a box office success with a collective total of $651 million.

== Films ==
Film	U.S. release date	Director	Screenwriter(s)	Producer(s)	Production company	Distributor(s)
Main series
Step Up	August 11, 2006	Anne Fletcher	Duane Adler and Melissa Rosenberg	Patrick Wachsberger, Erik Feig, Adam Shankman and Jennifer Gibgot	Touchstone Pictures; Summit Entertainment; Offspring Entertainment	Buena Vista Pictures Distribution
Step Up 2: The Streets	February 14, 2008	Jon M. Chu	Toni Ann Johnson and Karen Barna	Patrick Wachsberger, Erik Feig, Adam Shankman and Jennifer Gibgot	Touchstone Pictures; Summit Entertainment; Offspring Entertainment	Walt Disney Studios Motion Pictures
Step Up 3D	August 6, 2010	Jon M. Chu	Amy Andelson & Emily Meyer	Patrick Wachsberger, Erik Feig, Adam Shankman and Jennifer Gibgot	Touchstone Pictures; Summit Entertainment; Offspring Entertainment	Walt Disney Studios Motion Pictures
Step Up Revolution	July 27, 2012	Scott Speer	Amanda Brody	Patrick Wachsberger, Erik Feig, Adam Shankman and Jennifer Gibgot	Offspring Entertainment	Summit Entertainment
Step Up: All In	August 8, 2014	Trish Sie	John Swetnam	Patrick Wachsberger, Erik Feig, Adam Shankman and Jennifer Gibgot	Offspring Entertainment	Summit Entertainment
Spin-off film
Step Up: Year of the Dance	January 21, 2020	Ron Yuan	Wendy Li	Jennifer Gibgot, Adam Shankman, Jon M. Chu, Dede Nickerson and Zeng Tian	Yuehua Entertainment; Infinity Pictures; Lions Gate China	Lionsgate

== Main series ==
=== Step Up (2006) ===
Tyler Gage (Channing Tatum) receives the opportunity of a lifetime after vandalizing a performing arts school, gaining him the chance to earn a scholarship and dance with an up-and-coming dancer, Nora Clark (Jenna Dewan).

=== Step Up 2: The Streets (2008) ===
Romantic sparks occur between two dance students (Andie and Chase) from very different backgrounds at the Maryland School of the Arts.

=== Step Up 3D (2010) ===
A group of New York City street dancers competes against international hip hop dancers in a competition.

=== Step Up Revolution (2012) ===
A group of flash mob dancers led by Sean (Ryan Guzman) and the daughter of a hotel tycoon, Emily (Kathryn McCormick), attempt to save a Miami strip populated by a tight-knit community from being developed into hotels using dance and rebellion.

=== Step Up: All In (2014) ===
All-stars from the previous Step Up installments come together in to compete in Las Vegas.

== Spin-off film ==
=== Step Up: Year of the Dance (2019) ===
Step Up: Year of the Dance (舞出我人生之舞所不能) (also known as Step Up China) is a 2019 Chinese produced and marketed film directed by Ron Yuan. Youth from different social classes in Beijing come together to form China's best dance crew and learn what it really means to be family. It was released in theaters internationally on June 26, 2019, and in the U.S. digitally on January 21, 2020.

== Television ==
Series	Seasons	Episodes	Originally released			Showrunner(s)
Series	Seasons	Episodes	First released	Last released	Network	Showrunner(s)
Step Up: High Water	3	30	January 31, 2018	December 18, 2022	YouTube Red; YouTube Premium; Starz	Holly Sorensen

=== Step Up: High Water (2018–2022) ===
A television series based on the film series and serving as a reboot. The series titled Step Up: High Water was released on January 31, 2018, on YouTube Red. YouTube renewed the series for a second season in May 2018, premiering on March 20, 2019.

The series was canceled after two seasons in August 2019, but in May 2020, the series was announced to have been renewed and picked up for third season on Starz. It is also renamed as Step Up in this season. It would premiere in October 2022, before being canceled again shortly before the finale in December.

== Principal cast ==
List indicators

This section includes characters who will appear or have appeared in the Step Up franchise.

- An empty grey cell indicates the character was not in the film, or that the character's official presence has not yet been confirmed.
- ^{C} indicates a cameo role.

Characters	Films						Television series	
Characters	Main series					Spin-off film	Television series	
Characters	Step Up	Step Up 2: The Streets	Step Up 3D	Step Up Revolution	Step Up: All In	Step Up: Year of the Dance	Step Up: High Water	
Characters	2006	2008	2010	2012	2014	2019	2018–2022	
Tyler Gage	Channing Tatum	Channing Tatum^{C}						
Nora Clark	Jenna Dewan	Mentioned						
Miles Darby	Mario							
Lucy Avila	Drew Sidora							
Camille Gage	Alyson Stoner		Alyson Stoner		Alyson Stoner			
Andrea "Andie" West		Briana Evigan			Briana Evigan			
Chase Collins		Robert Hoffman			Mentioned			
Robert "Moose" Alexander III		Adam G. Sevani	Adam G. Sevani	Adam G. Sevani	Adam G. Sevani			
Jenny Kido		Mari Koda	Mari Koda	Mari Koda	Mari Koda			
Hair		Chris Scott	Chris Scott	Chris Scott	Chris Scott			
Monster		Luis Rosado	Luis Rosado		Luis Rosado			
Cable		Harry Shum Jr.	Harry Shum Jr.					
Blake Collins		Will Kemp						
Sophie Donovan		Cassie Ventura						
Vladd			Chadd "Madd Chadd" Smith	Chadd "Madd Chadd" Smith	Chadd "Madd Chadd" Smith			
Jason Hardlerson			Stephen "tWitch" Boss	Stephen "tWitch" Boss	Stephen "tWitch" Boss			
Martin Santiago			Martin Lombard		Martin Lombard			
Marcos Santiago			Facundo Lombard		Facundo Lombard			
Luke Katcher			Rick Malambri					
Natalie			Sharni Vinson					
Julien			Joe Slaughter					
Sean Asa				Ryan Guzman	Ryan Guzman			
Eddy				Misha Gabriel	Misha Gabriel			
Emily Anderson				Kathryn McCormick	Mentioned			
William "Bill" Anderson				Peter Gallagher				
Violet					Parris Goebel			
Alexxa Brava					Izabella Miko			
Jasper					Stephen "Stevo" Jones			
Tie Hou						Huang Jingxing		
Tie She						Owodog		
Dai						Kim Sung-joo		
Xiao Fei						Meng Meiqi		
USA Phantom Crew						Will Adams		
USA Phantom Crew						Janelle Ginstra		
USA Phantom Crew						Jade Chynoweth		
Janelle Baker							Lauryn McClain	
Tal Baker							Petrice Jones	Keiynan Lonsdale
Dondre Hall							Marcus Mitchell	Marcus Mitchell
Rigo Octavio							Terrence Green	Terrence Green
Davis Jimenez							Carlito Olivero	Carlito Olivero
Odalie Allen							Jade Chynoweth	Jade Chynoweth
Poppy Martinez							Kendra Oyesanya	Kendra Oyesanya
King							Eric Graise	Eric Graise
Al Baker							Faizon Love	Faizon Love
Collette Jones							Naya Rivera	Christina Milian
Sage Odom							Ne-Yo	Ne-Yo
Marquise Howard							Terayle Hill	Terayle Hill
Erin								Tricia Helfer
Angel								Rebbi Rose
Cruz								Enrique Murciano

== Additional crew and production details ==
Title	Crew/Detail					
Title	Composer	Cinematographer	Editor(s)	Production companies	Distributor(s)	Running time
Step Up	Aaron Zigman	Michael Seresin	Nancy Richardson	Touchstone Pictures, Summit Entertainment, Offspring Entertainment	Buena Vista Pictures Distribution	1 hr 43 mins
Step Up 2: The Streets	Aaron Zigman	Max Malkin	Andrew Marcus & Nicholas Erasmus	Touchstone Pictures, Summit Entertainment, Offspring Entertainment	Walt Disney Studios Motion Pictures	1 hr 38 mins
Step Up 3D	Bear McCreary	Ken Seng	Andrew Marcus	Touchstone Pictures, Summit Entertainment, Offspring Entertainment	Walt Disney Studios Motion Pictures	1 hr 47 mins
Step Up Revolution	Aaron Zigman	Karsten Gopinath	Avi Youabian & Matthew Friedman	Summit Entertainment, Offspring Entertainment, Lionsgate Films	Lions Gate Entertainment	1 hr 39 mins
Step Up: All In	Jeff Cardoni	Brian Pearson	Niven Howie	Summit Entertainment, Offspring Entertainment, Lionsgate Films	Lions Gate Entertainment	1 hr 52 mins
Step Up: High Water	Jared Gutstadt & Jeff Peters Stephanie Economou EmmoLei Sankofa	Joaquin Sedillo Rohn Schmidt David Rush Morrison	Jamin Bricker, Joe Mitacek, Nathan Easterling, Ryan Jones, and David Abramson	Lionsgate Television Studios, Everheart Productions, Free Association, Offspring Entertainment, Picturestart, YouTube Red Original Series, YouTube Premium Series, Starz Original Series	YouTube Red YouTube Premium Starz Network	25 hrs 50 mins episodes
Step Up: Year of the Dance	Bohan Xiao	Zhang Longtao	Jiang Yong	Lions Gate Films, Yuehua Entertainment, Shanghai Film Group	Lions Gate Entertainment	1 hr 30 mins

== Reception ==
=== Box office ===
Film	Box office gross			Box office ranking	Budget	Reference
Film	North America	Outside North America	Worldwide	All time North America	Budget	Reference
Step Up	$65,328,121	$48,866,726	$114,194,847	#931	$12 million	
Step Up 2: The Streets	$58,017,783	$92,798,917	$150,816,700	#1083	$17.5 million	
Step Up 3D	$42,400,223	$116,891,586	$159,291,809	#1526	$30 million	
Step Up Revolution	$35,074,677	$105,396,069	$140,470,746	#1862	$33 million	
Step Up: All In	$14,904,384	$71,261,262	$86,165,646	—N/a	$35 million	
Step Up: Year of the Dance	—N/a	$388,518	$388,518	—N/a	$17 million	
Totals	$215,725,188	$435,603,078	$651,328,266		$144.5 million	
List indicator^{(A)} indicates the adjusted totals based on current ticket prices (calculated by Box Office Mojo).

=== Critical and public response ===
Film	Rotten Tomatoes	Metacritic	CinemaScore
Step Up	21% (108 reviews)	48 (23 reviews)	A-
Step Up 2: The Streets	28% (65 reviews)	50 (20 reviews)	A-
Step Up 3D	47% (124 reviews)	45 (23 reviews)	B+
Step Up Revolution	41% (98 reviews)	43 (22 reviews)	B+
Step Up: All In	42% (52 reviews)	45 (17 reviews)	B+
Step Up: Year of the Dance	N/A	—N/a	—N/a

== In other media ==
Exercise releases

Officially licensed workout routine videos were produced for straight-to-home video media:

- Step Up Revolution Dance Workout which was released on December 4, 2012.
- Step Up Revolution: Hip-Hop Cardio Burn which was released on December 3, 2013.

Live stage show

- Step Up: Dubai, All In! debuted in 2016 at the Motiongate Dubai.

== See also ==
- The Legion of Extraordinary Dancers
