= Step Up 3D =

- Theatrical release poster
- Directed by: Jon M. Chu
- Written by: Amy Andelson; Emily Meyer
- Based on: Characters by Duane Adler
- Produced by: Patrick Wachsberger; Erik Feig; Adam Shankman; Jennifer Gibgot
- Starring: Rick Malambri; Adam G. Sevani; Sharni Vinson; Alyson Stoner
- Cinematography: Ken Seng
- Edited by: Andrew Marcus
- Music by: Bear McCreary
- Production companies: Touchstone Pictures; Summit Entertainment; Offspring Entertainment
- Distributed by: Walt Disney Studios Motion Pictures
- Release dates: August 2, 2010 (El Capitan Theater); August 6, 2010 (United States)
- Running time: 107 minutes
- Country: United States
- Language: English
- Budget: $30 million
- Box office: $159.2 million

Step Up 3D (also known simply as Step Up 3) is a 2010 American 3D dance film directed by Jon M. Chu and written by Amy Andelson and Emily Meyer. It is the third in the Step Up film series. The film features the return of Adam G. Sevani and Alyson Stoner, who portrayed Moose from Step Up 2: The Streets and Camille Gage from Step Up, respectively. It also stars Rick Malambri and Sharni Vinson.

The film follows Moose and Camille Gage as they head to New York University, the former of whom is majoring in electrical engineering after promising his father that he would not dance anymore. However, he soon stumbles upon a dance battle, meeting Luke Katcher and his House of Pirates dance crew and teams up with them to compete in the World Jam dance contest against their rival, the House of Samurai dance crew.

Step Up 3D premiered at the El Capitan Theater in Hollywood on August 2, 2010, and was released in the United States on August 6, by Walt Disney Studios Motion Pictures. The film went on to become the highest grossing of the series, earning $159.2 million, but received mixed reviews from critics, who praised the choreography and visuals, but criticized the plot and acting.

A fourth in the series, Step Up Revolution, was released in 2012.

== Plot ==
Moose and Camille go to NYC to attend NYU. He is majoring in electrical engineering after promising his father that he would not dance anymore. While touring the campus, Moose sees a pair of Limited Edition Gun Metal Nike Dunks worn by Luke Katcher, the leader of the House of Pirates dance crew.

As Moose follows Luke he stumbles upon a dance battle, where he beats Kid Darkness from the dancing crew House of Samurai. Luke takes him back to his place, an old warehouse converted into a club. There he tries to convince Moose to join his dance crew, with whom he teams up. Luke believes that with the skills of Moose and the rest of his dance crew, they could win the grand prize in the World Jam Championships contest to help pay the mortgage, as the warehouse is in arrears so could be auctioned off.

Luke meets Natalie at the club and notices her dancing abilities, so enlists her to become part of the crew, unaware of Natalie's motives. Moose has to choose between his studies and dance, between a test and a dance competition. He goes to test, but seeing the paper and receiving a message from Luke, he rushes to the competition just in time.

Luke and Natalie become increasingly closer. He shows her his recordings and dance interviews. Natalie is hiding the fact that her brother is Julien, the leader of the House of Samurai, and lies about everything but the love connection between her and Luke.

Natalie faces a hard decision between her love and family. She confronts Luke, asking what happened with him and Julien. He explains that Julien was a member of the House of Pirates, but has a gambling problem. He once wagered against the crew then threw the battle, so they kicked him out.

After arguing with Julien, Natalie decides to leave Luke rather than betray him further. Julien invites Luke to her birthday party using her phone. Luke asks Moose to attend the party with him, but they are not permitted to enter as they have no invitation. They find a way to get in and Luke and Natalie dance a tango. Julien reveals her identity so Luke is upset with her.

When Luke arrives back at the warehouse, he finds it is foreclosed. Angry at himself for not being a better leader, he exclaims that the House of Pirates is over, and the crew members go their separate ways. Moose and Camille are best friends, but Moose does not see that she is in love with him. The two fall out after Moose shows up late to a party; the final straw after being distant with her since arriving at university.

Moose and Camille make up in the streets by dancing as Fred Astaire and Ginger Rogers to a remix of "I Won't Dance". Camille insists Moose never give up dancing as he was born to do it. Moose helps out Luke by bringing the House of Pirates back together, and finding additional members for the crew including Camille and The MSA Crew from the previous film.

They discover that several former Pirates are now performing with the House of Samurai. Former crewmate Carlos informs them that Julien has bought their warehouse, but says they can have it back if they throw the battle, but they refuse to take the offer.

Natalie helps Luke and the Pirates win the World Jam with their practiced routine. She secretly helps him get into film school and invites him to come with her to California, so he meets her at the train station. They kiss just as Moose kisses Camille. Before leaving, Luke gives Moose his pair of Limited Edition Gun Metal Nike Dunks.

== Cast ==
- Rick Malambri as Luke Katcher, the leader of the House of Pirates.
- Adam G. Sevani as Robert "Moose" Alexander III, a hip hop dancer who is studying electrical engineering at NYU.
- Sharni Vinson as Natalie, a talented street dancer who is recruited to join the House of Pirates.
- Alyson Stoner as Camille Gage, Moose's best friend and Tyler's foster sister who is a talented hip hop dancer.
- Joe Slaughter as Julien, the leader of the House of Samurai and Natalie's brother.
- Frank Moran as Moose's Dad
- Kathy Najimy as Moose's Mom
- Keith Stallworth as Jacob
- Kendra Andrews as Anala
- Stephen "tWitch" Boss as Jason Hardlerson
- Chadd "Madd Chadd" Smith as Vladd
- Jonathan "Legacy" Perez as Legz
- Martín Lombard as Martin Santiago
- Facundo Lombard as Marcos Santiago
- Oren "Flearock" Michaeli as Carlos, A person in the House of Pirates
- Daniel "Cloud" Campos as Kid Darkness
- Shirley Henriquez, as part of the pirates crew
- Luis Alberto Rodríguez, as part of the Pirates crew
- Carolina Ravassa as Kristen
- Alberto Collado Aracena, as part of the pirates crew
- Jose Hernandez
- Glenn Michael A. Mataro, as part of the pirates crew
- Tamara Levinson, as Bend

The MSA Crew

- Christopher Scott as Hair
- Harry Shum Jr. as Cable
- Janelle Cambridge as Fly
- LaJon Dantzler as Smiles
- Luis Rosado as Monster
- Mari Koda as Jenny Kido
- Danielle Polanco as Missy

The Lil Pirates

- Jalen Testermen
- Angelo "Lil Demon" Baligad
- Simrin C Player
- Jose BoyBoi Tena

== Soundtrack ==
Step Up 3D is the film soundtrack album from the motion picture Step Up 3D. The album was released on 27 July 2010. The singles from the album are: "Club Can't Handle Me" by Flo Rida featuring David Guetta, "Already Taken" by Trey Songz, "My Own Step" by Roscoe Dash and T-Pain featuring Fabo and "Irresistible" by Wisin & Yandel.
"Squeeze It (feat. Dada Life & Tiesto)" by DJ Frank E was used in the official advertisement of the film.

== Home media ==
The film was released by Touchstone Home Entertainment on Blu-ray 3D and DVD in the United Kingdom on November 29, 2010, in the United States on December 21, 2010, and in the Philippines on January 27, 2011.

== Reception ==
=== Critical response ===
Step Up 3D received mixed reviews from critics. Review aggregator Rotten Tomatoes gave it an approval rating of 47% based on 123 reviews, with an average score of 5.10/10. The website's critical consensus said: "It may not contain believable acting or a memorable plot, but Step Up 3-D delivers solid choreography and stunning visuals". It holds a score of 45 out of 100 on Metacritic from 23 reviews, indicating "mixed or average reviews". Audiences polled by CinemaScore gave the film a grade B+.

Keith Uhlich of Time Out New York named Step Up 3D the third-best film of 2010, arguing that it "[one-upped] the overpraised stereoscopic advancements of Avatar." In 2020, Uhlich named it the tenth-best film of the 2010s.

=== Box office ===
The film made $6,657,326 on its first night of release (August 6, 2010), landing second after the buddy cop film The Other Guys, which received $13,124,233. In the weekend box office the movie placed third with $15,812,311 behind the latter and Inception. Its domestic box-office run ended on November 4, 2010, having accumulated $42,400,223 and as of December 5, 2010 it has also earned $116,889,135 in other territories, for a worldwide total of $159,289,358. It has more than doubled the overseas gross of the first film, although it is the least-grossing film of the series in the United States and Canada. On the weekend lasting from October 8–10, 2010 it surpassed Step Up 2: The Streets to become the highest-grossing movie of the franchise worldwide. In terms of estimated attendance, it is far behind its predecessors. Besides the United States and Canada, countries where it grossed over $10 million were Germany ($13,869,503), Russia and the CIS ($12,131,409) and the United Kingdom, Ireland and Malta ($11,537,610).

=== Accolades ===
Melissa Muik, the film's music editor, was nominated for a 2011 Golden Reel Award for Best Sound Editing – Music in a Musical Feature Film.
