= Stephen "tWitch" Boss =

American dancer and TV producer (1982–2022)

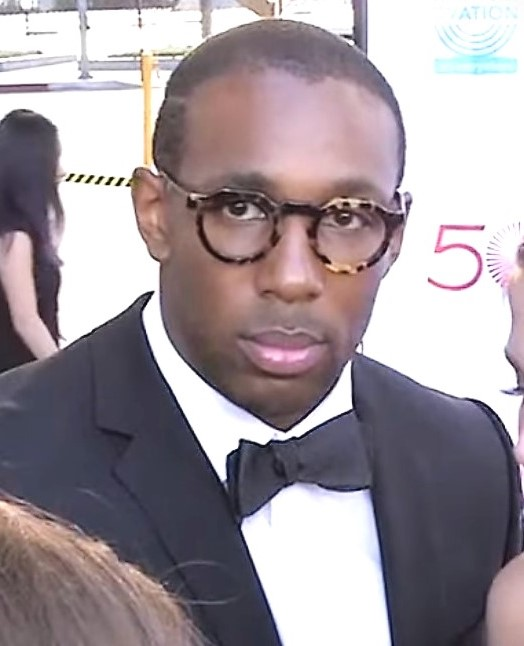
- Boss in 2014
- Born: Stephen Laurel Boss; September 29, 1982; Montgomery, Alabama, U.S.
- Died: December 13, 2022 (aged 40); Los Angeles, California, U.S.
- Education: Southern Union State Community College; Chapman University
- Occupations: Dancer; choreographer; actor; television producer; television personality
- Years active: 2003–2022
- Television: So You Think You Can Dance; Step Up films; The Ellen DeGeneres Show
- Spouse: Allison Holker (m. 2013)
- Children: 2

Stephen Laurel "tWitch" Boss (September 29, 1982 – December 13, 2022) was an American freestyle hip hop dancer, choreographer, actor, television producer, and television personality. In 2008, he finished in second place on the American version of So You Think You Can Dance (SYTYCD). From 2014 to May 2022, he was featured on The Ellen DeGeneres Show as a repeated guest host and he was also a co-executive producer of the program. He was featured in Ellen's Game of Games as a co-host to DeGeneres. Between 2018 and 2020, he and his wife, Allison Holker, hosted Disney's Fairy Tale Weddings on Freeform and Disney+.

== Early life ==
Boss was born on September 29, 1982, to Connie Boss Alexander and Sandford Rose in Montgomery, Alabama. He graduated from Lee High School in 2000 and studied dance performance at Southern Union State Community College in Wadley, Alabama, and Chapman University.

== Career ==
In 2003, Boss was a semifinalist on MTV's The Wade Robson Project and a runner-up on the television talent competition Star Search. He choreographed routines for South Korean pop/R&B singer Seven and helped train other YG Entertainment artists including Big Bang. In 2007, he was an uncredited "flamboyant dancer" in Blades of Glory and a Maybelle's Store Dancer in Hairspray.

After competing in So You Think You Can Dance, he taught dancing at South County Classical Ballet with fellow finalist Katee Shean. On April 30, 2013, he and Allison Holker performed a dance routine on Dancing with the Stars. They danced to "Crystallize" which was performed live by Lindsey Stirling.

Beginning on April 1, 2014, Boss was featured on The Ellen DeGeneres Show as a guest DJ. In October 2014, he announced that he had been cast in Magic Mike XXL. On August 17, 2020, he became a co-executive producer of Ellen DeGeneres's daytime talk show.

Boss was cast as Marcel X in the superhero movie Perfectus and later he had a feature role in the movie Ushers. He was a member of the dance troupes Breed OCLA and Chill Factor Crew.

=== So You Think You Can Dance ===
Boss first auditioned in 2007 for season 3 of the show and appeared on the program but was not selected to be in the Top 20. He returned to audition again in season 4 in 2008; he was selected to compete in the Top 20 and finished the competition as runner-up to fellow hip-hop contestant Joshua Allen. During Season 4 he danced with Katee Shean to a contemporary piece choreographed by Mia Michaels. The dance was nominated for an Emmy for choreography in the 61st Primetime Emmy Awards.

In season 5, Boss appeared again on So You Think You Can Dance with fellow season 4 contestant Katee Shean to perform their Emmy-nominated piece "Mercy," choreographed by Mia Michaels. He was one of the eleven "All-Stars" in season 7. He was an All-Star in seasons 7, 8, and 9 of So You Think You Can Dance, performing memorable routines including the hip hop number "Outta Your Mind" with ballet contestant Alex Wong, which was reprised by Ellen DeGeneres in Season 7's finale. He was the team captain for "Team Street" in Season 12 of So You Think You Can Dance. He was announced as a permanent judge for the seventeenth season in 2022.

Boss and Allison Holker, his wife, had an apparel line of athleisure named "DSG x tWitch + Allison Collection" which was sold by Dick's Sporting Goods.

=== Disney's Fairy Tale Weddings ===
Disney's Fairy Tale Weddings is a documentary television series featuring couples and their Disney-themed weddings, airing on Disney's Freeform network and the Disney+ streaming service. The show is a behind-the-scenes program featuring the weddings and engagements of couples at Disney destinations including Walt Disney World, Disneyland, Disney Cruise Line, and at Aulani in Hawaii. On October 17, 2017, Freeform announced the production of a seven-episode series to be released in the summer of 2018; it was hosted by Boss and Allison Holker. In November 2017, Freeform added a December 11, 2017, hour-long special, "Disney's Fairy Tale Weddings: Holiday Magic" as a part of its "25 Days of Christmas" event. Season 2 premiered on Disney+ on February 14, 2020.

== Personal life ==
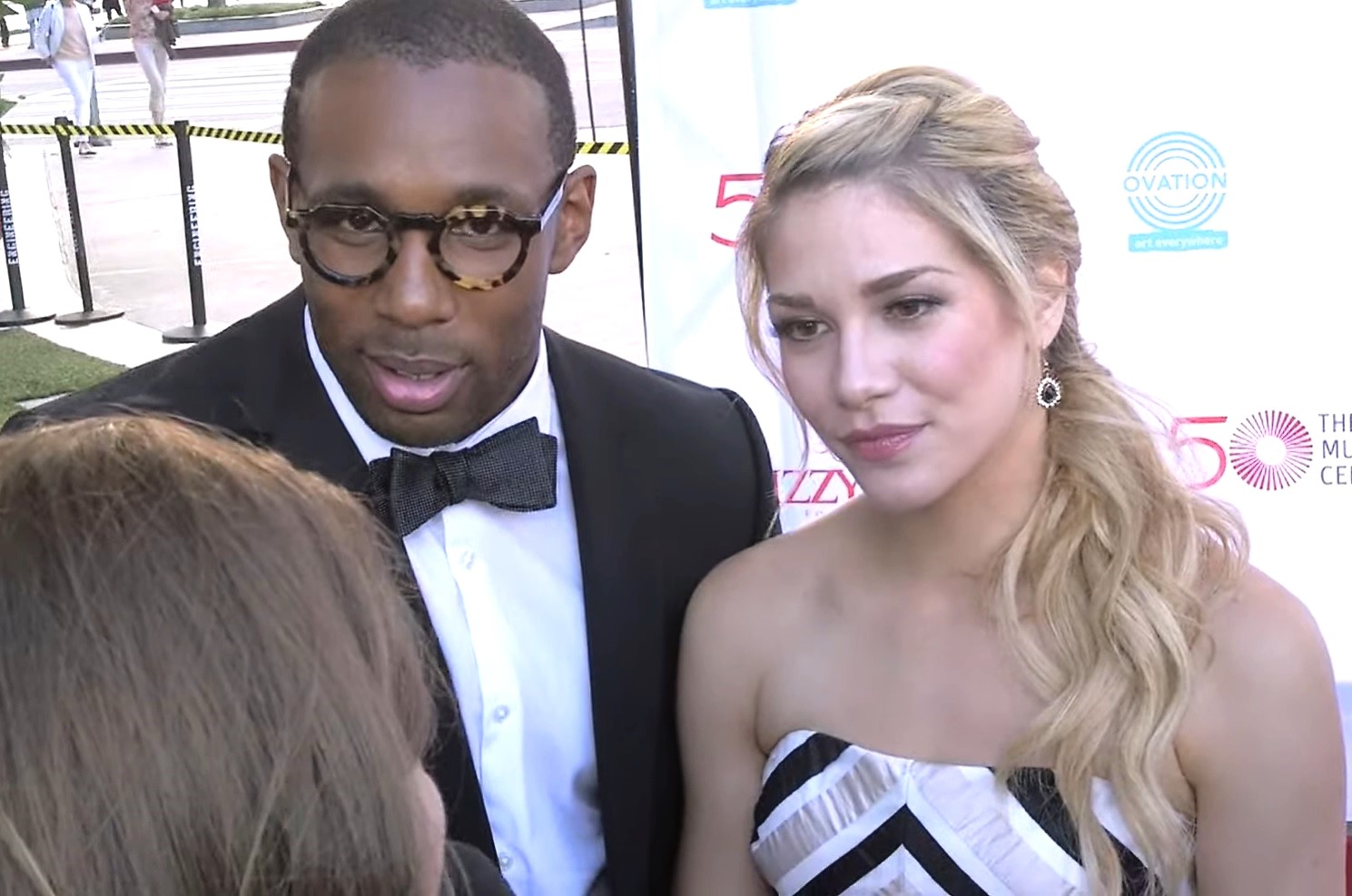
Boss and Allison Holker in 2014

On December 10, 2013, Boss and fellow SYTYCD alum Allison Holker married at Nigel Lythgoe's Villa San Juliette Vineyard and Winery in Paso Robles, California. Boss and Holker had two children.

== Death ==
On December 13, 2022, Boss was found dead in a hotel in Encino, Los Angeles. His death was ruled a suicide by self-inflicted gunshot wound to the head. He was 40 years old.

Boss' remains were interred at Forest Lawn Memorial Park.

== Filmography ==
=== Film ===
Year	Title	Role	Notes	Ref.
2007	Blades of Glory	Flamboyant Dancer	Uncredited	
2007	Hairspray	Maybelle's Store Dancer		
2010	Stomp the Yard: Homecoming	Taz		
2010	Step Up 3D	Jason Hardlerson		
2012	Step Up Revolution	Jason Hardlerson		
2014	Step Up: All In	Jason Hardlerson		
2015	Magic Mike XXL	Malik		
2022	The Hip Hop Nutcracker	Dad	Disney+ release; final role	

=== Television ===
Year	Title	Role	Notes	Ref.
2008	So You Think You Can Dance	Runner-up		
2010	Bones	Russell Leonard		
2011	So You Think You Can Dance	All Star		
2011	Touch	The Beastmaster		
2012	So You Think You Can Dance	All Star		
2012	Drop Dead Diva	Billy Donaldson	TV series, Season 6 episode 2: "Soulmates"	
2013	So You Think You Can Dance	All Star		
2013	Stars in Danger: The High Dive	Himself/Contestant		
2013	Dancing with the Stars			
2014–2022	The Ellen DeGeneres Show	Show DJ/Host		
2015	Bound & Babysitting	Ethan	TV film	
2015	So You Think You Can Dance	Team Captain-Team Street		
2017–2021	Ellen's Game of Games	Announcer		
2017–2020	Disney's Fairy Tale Weddings			
2018	Modern Family	Sho 'Nuff	Episode: "Wine Weekend"	
2018	Young & Hungry	Himself		
2018	So You Think You Can Dance	Judge		
2021	Clash of the Cover Bands	Host		
2022	The Real Dirty Dancing	Host		
2022	So You Think You Can Dance	Judge		
2022	Play-Doh Squished	Judge	Episode: "Space"	

=== Web series ===
Year	Title	Role	Notes	Ref.
2010	The Legion of Extraordinary Dancers	LXD Trainer	Season 2, Episode 1	
2010	The Legion of Extraordinary Dancers	Teacher, Student	Season 2, Episode 2	
2011	The Legion of Extraordinary Dancers: The Secrets of the Ra	Dr. E		
2016	Love	Doobie	Episode 6	

== Awards ==
- Runner-up, Star Search, 2003
- 3rd Place, MTV's The Wade Robson Project, 2003
- Runner-up, Season 4 of So You Think You Can Dance, 2008
