= Step Up: All In =

- Theatrical release poster
- Directed by: Trish Sie
- Written by: John Swetnam
- Based on: Characters by Duane Adler
- Produced by: Adam Shankman; Jennifer Gibgot; Patrick Wachsberger; Erik Feig
- Starring: Ryan Guzman; Briana Evigan; Stephen "tWitch" Boss; Misha Gabriel; Izabella Miko; Alyson Stoner; Adam Sevani
- Cinematography: Brian Pearson
- Edited by: Niven Howie
- Music by: Jeff Cardoni
- Production company: Offspring Entertainment
- Distributed by: Summit Entertainment
- Release dates: July 9, 2014 (Belgium); August 8, 2014 (United States)
- Running time: 112 minutes
- Country: United States
- Language: English
- Budget: $35 million
- Box office: $86.1 million

Step Up: All In is a 2014 American dance film directed by Trish Sie and written by John Swetnam. The film is the sequel to Step Up Revolution (2012) and the fifth and final installment in the Step Up film series. It stars Ryan Guzman, Briana Evigan, Stephen "tWitch" Boss, Misha Gabriel, Izabella Miko, Alyson Stoner, and Adam Sevani.

Step Up: All In was released in the United States on August 8, 2014, by Summit Entertainment. The film grossed over $86 million worldwide and received mixed reviews from critics.

== Plot ==
Sean Asa and his flashmob crew, The Mob, have relocated from Miami to Los Angeles, where they are now trying to make a living from dancing, but are turned down at every audition. After being refused at another audition, the Mob visits a club where they are noticed and challenged to a dance battle by another crew, the Grim Knights.

The Grim Knights win the battle and the Mob decides to pack up and leave Los Angeles and return to Miami. This is mostly because of financial difficulties, but also thinking there is nothing left for them and that they are not prepared for Los Angeles.

Sean decides to stay and while there, he notices a dance competition called The Vortex taking place with the prize being a three-year Las Vegas booking, inspiring him to put together a new crew with help from Moose. Moose gets Sean a job working as a janitor in a dance center owned by Moose's grandparents, where Sean takes up residence in a janitor's closet.

Sean and Moose recruit Andie West and later Vladd, Violet, Hair, Chad, Monster, the Santiago Twins, Jenny Kido and Gauge to the crew. The group soon makes an audition video as the LMNTRIX and are accepted into the competition a few weeks later.

The crew heads to Las Vegas to compete. Upon arriving, Sean finds out that both the Grim Knights and the Mob are also in the competition, motivating the LMNTRIX to practice extra hard. While the rest of the crew are at a bar, Sean and Andie reveal they have broken up with their respective partners.

Moose is kissed by another girl while freestyle dancing at the bar, which his girlfriend Camille Gage witnesses. She runs off, prompting Moose to leave the crew and return to Los Angeles to make up with her.

The LMNTRIX battle the Mob in a Vortex exhibition match; during the battle, Sean tries to force Andie to perform a trick they tried during one of their practices but she refuses and leaves. The LMNTRIX, however, still win the battle and the Mob leave, angry at Sean.

Sean finds Andie outside, where she confronts him about his actions, saying she was not ready to perform the trick. He realizes that he has been selfish and made a lot of mistakes; he apologizes to the Mob and later makes up with Andie and the LMNTRIX.

Moose goes home and finds Camille on their patio, where she reveals that she wasn't actually upset at him, but was jealous when she saw his dancing and realized that she hasn't committed herself to it, despite being a talented dancer; they later make up.

Chad and Jenny Kido overhear Alexxa Brava, the host of The Vortex, and Jasper, the leader of the Grim Knights, making out, realizing that Alexxa is rigging the competition. Once the whole crew finds out, they come up with a plan to teach them a lesson.

Moose returns and rejoins the crew (bringing Camille along), and the Mob join forces with the LMNTRIX for the competition. When the finals of The Vortex approach (the Grim Knights vs. the LMNTRIX), the Grim Knights give a great performance, which Alexxa remarks will be hard to beat.

Before LMNTRIX perform, Sean takes the stage and discusses with the crowd that his experiences have taught him what really matters. He then persuades the crowd to forget about winning or losing and just enjoy the show. The rest of the crew then take the stage and give an amazing performance. Sean and Andie decide to end the dance by performing the trick he wanted her to do earlier, which they successfully complete, followed by a passionate kiss between them, leaving the crowd amazed.

The producers call Alexxa and inform her that the LMNTRIX won and that they will get the three-year contract for their own show. The film ends with the LMNTRIX and the Mob happily celebrating their excellent performance and victory.

== Cast ==
- Ryan Guzman as Sean Asa
- Briana Evigan as Andrea "Andie" West
- Adam Sevani as Robert "Moose" Alexander III
- Alyson Stoner as Camille
- Misha Gabriel as Eddy
- Izabella Miko as Alexxa Brava
- Stephen "tWitch" Boss as Jason Hardlerson
- Stephen "Stevo" Jones as Jasper
- Chadd "Madd Chadd" Smith as Vladd
- Parris Goebel as Violet
- David "Kid David" Shreibman as Chad
- Mari Koda as Jenny Kido
- Christopher Scott as Hair
- Luis Rosado as Monster
- Martín Lombard as Martin Santiago
- Facundo Lombard as Marcos Santiago
- Cyrus "Glitch" Spencer as Gauge
- Celestina Aladekoba as Celestina
- Freddy HS as Accounting Manager
- Karin Konoval as Ana

== Soundtrack ==
Step Up: All In

Soundtrack album by Various Artists
- Released: August 5, 2014
- Genres: Dance; hip hop; R&B; dancehall; dubstep; trap
- Length: 47:04
- Label: Ultra Records
- Producer: Various Artists

Step Up: All In (Original Motion Picture Soundtrack) is a soundtrack album from the film of the same name. The album was released on August 5, 2014, by Ultra Records.

No.	Title	Artist(s)	Length
1.	"Revolution"	Diplo featuring Faustix, Imanos and Kai	4:23
2.	"My Homies Still"	Lil Wayne featuring Big Sean	4:06
3.	"Do It"	Pitbull featuring Mayer Hawthorne	3:40
4.	"I Won't Let You Down" (Shockbit Remix)	OK Go	2:26
5.	"Delirious (Boneless)"	Steve Aoki, Chris Lake and Tujamo featuring Kid Ink	3:43
6.	"How You Do That"	B.o.B	3:08
7.	"Lapdance"	N.E.R.D featuring Vita and Lee Harvey	3:30
8.	"Every Little Step"	Bobby Brown	3:59
9.	"Rage the Night Away"	Steve Aoki featuring Waka Flocka Flame	3:54
10.	"Demons"	Zeds Dead	3:53
11.	"Hands Up" (Yellow Claw Remix)	Dirtcaps	3:20
12.	"Turn It Up"	Celestina & Bianca Raquel	3:45
13.	"Squeeze Me"	Kraak & Smaak featuring Ben Westbeech	3:17
14.	"Hands Up in the Air"	Celestina	3:38
Total length:			47:04

== Home media ==
The film was released on DVD and Blu-ray on November 4, 2014.

== Reception ==
=== Critical response ===
The film was met with mixed reviews. On Rotten Tomatoes, the film has an approval rating of 43% based on 51 reviews, with an average rating of 5.03/10. The website's consensus states: "With slick choreography all too often interrupted by feeble attempts at plot, Step Up: All In would be more fun with all of its dialogue edited out." On Metacritic, the film has a weighted average score of 45 out of 100 based on reviews from 17 critics, indicating "mixed or average reviews".

=== Box office ===
The film debuted at #6 in the North American box office, earning $6.5 million. The film grossed $14,904,384 in America and $71,261,262 in other territories for a worldwide total of $86,165,646, making it the lowest-grossing film in the series.

== See also ==
- List of films set in Las Vegas
