= Lombard Twins =

Martin and Facundo Lombard
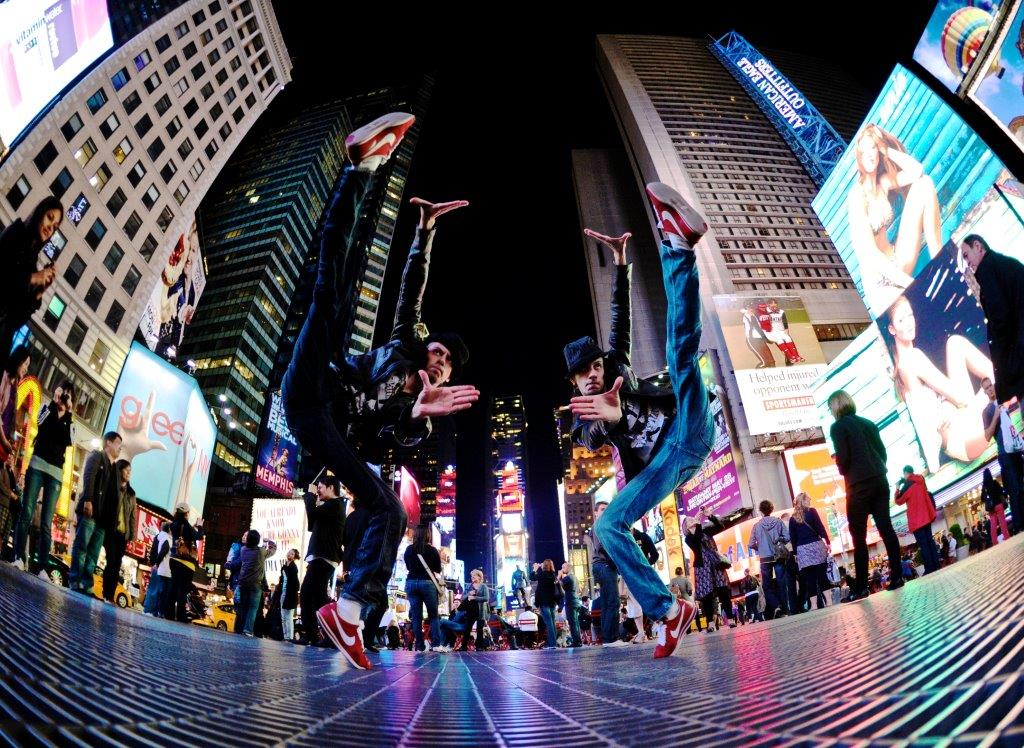

Background information
- Born: July 7, 1977 (age 48); Buenos Aires, Argentina
- Genres: Hip-hop dance, tap dance, Free Expression
- Occupations: Dancers, actors, directors, choreographers, composers, producers, models
- Website: www.lombardtwins.com

Martin and Facundo Lombard (born July 7, 1977), professionally known as the Lombard Twins, are Argentinian dancers, choreographers, actors, directors, composers and producers widely known for their role in the Step Up series. As identical twin brothers, they developed a dance form that focuses on individual emotion and expression, which they call "Free Expression."

== Early life and career ==
The twins were born in Buenos Aires, Argentina in the neighborhood of Mataderos, raised by a single mother. They began dancing together at age seven, inspired by Michael Jackson, subsequently dropping out of school at thirteen; and that same year debuting on the Argentinian television show, Ritmo de la Noche (Rhythm of the Night).

In 1993, at fifteen they began acting, struggling to build an acting career as twins, while only recognized for their dancing. After their unsuccessful acting careers, they created their own dance choreographies and began playing drums and piano, expanding into other visual art forms — including writing short films at age nineteen.

At twenty when they met James Brown and he invited them on stage to perform with him at a small concert in Buenos Aires, Brown called them the 'Soul Boys.' On Brown's recommendation they moved to New York a year later. They continued working with Brown for almost a decade.

=== After Moving to New York ===
In 1998, at 21, they moved to New York City with $800. They lived frugally in Spanish Harlem as undocumented immigrants, unable to speak English, without friends or family in New York, resorting to sleeping at least once in the subway. They learned to tap dance by frequenting jazz clubs also frequented by accomplished tap dancers.

In 1999, they met, Michael Jackson, a childhood idol, at corner in Midtown NYC, in his car, the twins spotted and danced for him. Jackson rolled down his window, saying "you were very clean, you must practice a lot." A year later, they met Jackson at the Times Square Virgin Records store. Ten years later, they performed at Jackson's induction into the National Museum of Dance in Saratoga Springs, New York.

=== Acting and modeling ===
The Lombard Twins gained recognition after their role as the Santiago Twins in the films, Step Up 3D (2010) and Step Up All In (2014). They also appeared in the promotional trailer for Men in Black 3 with Will Smith and Tommy Lee Jones. Leading up to their roles in Step Up, the Lombards appeared with Whitney Houston and George Michael and also modeled for Versace and Vogue.

In 2011, they acted in the film "Los Marziano," directed and written by Ana Katz, alongside Guillermo Francella, Mercedes Moran and Arturo Puig.,

=== Short films ===
The twins directed and wrote the short films: Infacia 34, Sublevados, Free Expression, Chant Et Fugue, Escualo, Persecuta.

Year	Title	Credit
2008	Infacia 34	Writers, Directors, Actors
2009	Sublevados	Writers, Directors, Choreographers
2012	Free Expression	Writers, Directors, Choreographers, Dancers
2012	Chant Et Fugue	Writers, Directors, Choreographers, Dancers
2015	Esculao	Writers, Directors, Choreographers, Dancers
2017	Persecuta	Writers, Directors, Choreographers, Dancers

== Works ==
The Lombard twins created two stage productions of which they choreographed, directed and produced, including the 2004 semi-autobiographical show "Dreamers" based on their first experience living in New York City, and the 2008 concert, Lombard Plays Piazzolla, based on Astor Piazzolla's music. Lombard Plays Piazzolla made its world premier at the New York City Center, and NBC's "Rosie Live" with Rosie O'Donnell.

=== Free Expression ===
The Lombard Twins' discovery of Free Expression was based on emotion. "Free Expression transcends the rules, traditions, and attitudes inherent to many established dance techniques of today and focuses on individual emotion and expression," described the "Twins"in an interview with Dance Informa.

It was developed from the idea that dance styles do not allow for free expression because they are connected to a predetermined attitude and are associated with specific rules, creating emotional boundaries. The twins believed in order to fully express oneself, "it is necessary to let go of the predetermined attitude and the rules of a certain style, culture or tradition".

=== Dance Influences ===
Martin and Facundo's major inspirations include Michael Jackson, Jorge Donn, prominent Argentinian ballet dancer, and Gregory Hines, American dancer, actor and singer.
