= Step Up 2: The Streets =

- Theatrical release poster
- Directed by: Jon M. Chu
- Written by: Toni Ann Johnson; Karen Barna
- Based on: Characters by Duane Adler
- Produced by: Patrick Wachsberger; Erik Feig; Adam Shankman; Jennifer Gibgot
- Starring: Briana Evigan; Robert Hoffman; Will Kemp; Cassie Ventura
- Cinematography: Max Malkin
- Edited by: Andrew Marcus; Nicholas Erasmus
- Music by: Aaron Zigman
- Production companies: Touchstone Pictures; Summit Entertainment; Offspring Entertainment
- Distributed by: Walt Disney Studios Motion Pictures
- Release date: February 14, 2008 (United States)
- Running time: 97 minutes
- Country: United States
- Language: English
- Budget: $17.5 million
- Box office: $150.8 million

Step Up 2: The Streets is a 2008 American dance film directed by Jon M. Chu in his feature directorial debut and written by Toni Ann Johnson and Karen Barna. The sequel to Step Up (2006) and the second installment in the Step Up film series, it stars Briana Evigan, Robert Hoffman, Will Kemp, and Cassie Ventura.

Once again set at the fictional Maryland School of the Arts, the story revolves around rebellious teenage street dancer Andie West (Evigan), who lands at the elite school and finds herself fighting to fit in while also trying to hold onto her old life. She eventually joins forces with the school's hottest dancer Chase Collins (Hoffman) to form a crew of classmate outcasts to compete in Baltimore's underground dance battle The Streets, finding a way to live her dream while building a bridge between her two separate worlds.

Released in the United States on February 14, 2008, by Walt Disney Studios Motion Pictures, the film received mixed-to-negative reviews from critics, although the reviews were better than those for its predecessor, but became a box office success, grossing $150.8 million worldwide against a production budget of $17.5 million.

A sequel, Step Up 3D, was released in August 2010.

== Plot ==
In Baltimore, Maryland, Andie West pursues her dream of becoming a street dancer, but feels like she does not belong anywhere. Her mother recently died of cancer, so she now lives with a guardian, her mother's best friend Sarah. She is doing poorly at school, but her passion for dancing brings something good into her life. She rehearses regularly with her "crew", the 410, to retain top ranking in the illegal competition "The Streets".

Andie's friend and older brother figure Tyler Gage persuades her to audition for the Maryland School of the Arts, hoping it will help turn her life around the same way it did for him in the first film. Andie auditions and Chase Collins convinces his older brother Blake, the school's director, to let her join.

When the 410 find out about Andie's studies, they angrily kick her out. Andie and Chase form a new crew with help from many people he knows at the school who are not accepted as who they are (Smiles, Hair, Monster, Fly, Cable, Jenny Kido, and Moose). Chase has a copied key to the studio and the crew secretly practices their routine late at night when the school is empty.

Andie's friend Missy joins the crew after dropping out of the 410 following Andie's removal. She tells them that the only way to enter the streets is to first do a prank and post it on the internet to show that they are entering the competition. Wanting revenge from being humiliated before, Chase decides to make a fool out of Tuck, leader of the 410, by leaving a dead fish in the vent of his home.

Not wanting a new crew to compete with, the 410 warn Andie's new crew to stay out of the Streets or there will be consequences. Tuck finds Chase and assaults him because of the prank. Chase comes into school the next day badly bruised and hurt. On top of that the 410 also had trashed the dance studio.

Director Collins forbids the school from being involved in these types of competitions and expels Andie from MSA because of her involvement with the Streets competition; she proclaims herself the sole participant to protect her teammates. Chase attempts to defend her, but Director Collins is too busy with an upcoming MSA fundraiser to let her back in.

On the night of the fundraiser, Andie receives a text message that the Streets is on that night. Along with Andie, her whole crew gets the text message. They decide to ditch the MSA fundraiser to compete at the Streets.

When Director Collins goes in search of his students, he ends up at the Streets as well. He sees them compete and realizes that the street dancing he has been opposing is in fact a legitimate form of artistic expression. He accepts Andie back into MSA. Andie's crew is now her supportive group of friends and her education is now secured.

== Cast ==
- Briana Evigan as Andrea "Andie" West, the main protagonist and a talented street dancer who has felt out of place ever since her mother died from cancer. As her father died prior to the movie, she gets poor grades in school as she does not care about education.
- Robert Hoffman as Chase Collins, Blake's younger brother who falls in love with Andie
- Adam Sevani as Robert "Moose" Alexander III, a talented dancer who is Andie and Missy's best friend
- Will Kemp as Blake Collins, the strict director of MSA and Chase's older brother
- Cassie Ventura as Sophie Donovan, Chase's ex-girlfriend who later falls in love with Moose
- Christopher Scott as Hair, a talented choreographer
- Harry Shum Jr. as Cable
- Janelle Cambridge as Fly
- LaJon Dantzler as Smiles
- Luis Rosado as Monster
- Mari Koda as Jenny Kido
- Sonja Sohn as Sarah, Andie's overprotective legal guardian. She took Andie in after her mother died, promising that she would protect her best friend's daughter. Sarah is concerned about Andie's safety, because of her illegal activities with the 410, and decides to send her to live with her aunt in Texas, but Tyler convinces her to send her to Maryland School of the Arts. When Andie gets expelled (taking the blame of vandalizing the school to protect her crew), Sarah declares that she's had enough of Andie's behavior and that she now must go to live with her aunt in Texas; however, when Sarah hears about what Andie did to protect her crew, she becomes so proud of her that she reconsiders sending Andie to Texas and allows her to compete at the Streets with her crew.
- Black Thomas as Tucker "Tuck", the leader of the 410 and the main antagonist
- Telisha Shaw as Felicia, Andie's best friend who eventually turns on her & sells her out to Tuck for dancing at MSA
- Danielle Polanco as Melissa "Missy" Serrano, Andie and Moose's best friend who eventually quits 410
- Channing Tatum as Tyler Gage (cameo), the protagonist from the first film and a skilled but troubled dancer in his teens who turned his life around at MSA and now is touring as a professional dancer with Nora
- Rockstar Logu as Mike (cameo), Indian artist
- BooG!e as DJ Sand (uncredited)
- Jenny Kressebuch as Store Clerk
- Ariana Glover and Chad Glover as the two youngest kids in the cast background dancers (#7 and #2).

== Reception ==
=== Box office ===
At the U.S. Box office, the film opened at #3 and earned $18,908,826 in its opening weekend. As of August 4, 2008, Step Up 2: The Streets have grossed $58,017,783 in domestic box office and $92,798,917 in other parts of the world, bringing a worldwide total of $150,816,700, outperforming its predecessor.

=== Critical response ===
The film was met with mixed-to-negative reviews from critics. On Rotten Tomatoes, it has an approval rating of 28% based on reviews from 65 critics, with an average rating of 4.9/10. The website's consensus reads, "There's a kinetic appeal to the handsome cast and their smooth moves, but everything else about Step Up 2: The Streets is been there, danced that." On Metacritic it has a weighted average score of 50 out of 100 based on reviews from 20 critics, indicating "mixed or average reviews". Audiences polled by CinemaScore gave the film a grade A−.

=== Accolades ===
- Teen Choice Award for Choice Movie: Drama (winner)
- Teen Choice Award for Choice Movie Breakout Female (Briana Evigan, nominee)
- MTV Movie Award for Best Kiss (Briana Evigan and Robert Hoffman, winner)
- Imagen Foundation Awards for Best Supporting Actress (Danielle Polanco, nominee)

== Home media ==
The film was released on DVD and Blu-ray on July 15, 2008.

Special features

- Through Fresh Eyes – The Making of Step Up 2
- Outlaws of Hip-Hop – Meet the "410"
- Lead Actor Robert Hoffman Video Prank
- Outtakes from Step Up 2: The Streets – Cassie Performs "Is It You"
- Deleted Scenes – Including Dances by JabbaWockeeZ and West Coast Riders Dance Crews
- Music Videos
1. Flo Rida feat. T-Pain - "Low"
2. Missy Elliott - "Ching-a-Ling/Shake Your Pom Pom"
3. Cherish feat. Yung Joc - "Killa"
4. Plies feat. Akon - "Hypnotized"
5. Brit & Alex - "Let It Go"

== Soundtrack ==
A soundtrack album to the film was released by Atlantic Records on February 5, 2008.
