= Celestina Aladekoba =

American dancer

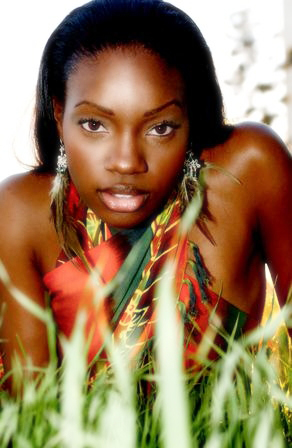
- Celestina Aladekoba
- Occupation(s): Reality television actress, dancer and choreographer
- Website: CelestinaMusic.com

Celestina Aladekoba is a Nigerian-American recording artist, dancer and actress. She is perhaps best known for appearing in Prince's "Black Sweat" music video, and in MTV's original dance-themed reality show program DanceLife.

== Life and career ==
Aladekoba grew up in Nigeria and Maryland.

Prior to becoming famous, she was known for playing basketball and for winning the Miss California Jr. She later was a background dancer in Missy Elliott, Will Smith and Usher music videos. The DanceLife cast appeared on The Ellen DeGeneres Show.

Aladekoba's dancing has garnered her good reception and comparisons to choreographers Fatima Robinson, Debbie Allen and Judith Jamison. She is known for being an extremely flexible dancer and for making up her own dance moves.

Aladekoba has appeared on TV shows including That's So Raven, The Game and 90210. She was in Robin Thicke's video "Magic" (2008) and is also in the Step Up sequels, Step Up Revolution (2012) and Step Up: All In (2014).

In 2014, she was a dancer in Jason Derulo's music video for "Talk Dirty".
