= Damaine Radcliff =

American actor

- Born: Damaine Anthony Radcliff; June 7, 1979 (age 47); The Bronx, New York, U.S.
- Occupation: Actor/Director
- Years active: 2001–present

Damaine Anthony Radcliff (born June 7, 1979), is an American film actor who was born in The Bronx, New York City. Founder of Raining Giants, he is most known for his starring roles in the movies Glory Road, Step Up and as Executive Producer of Rambo: Last Blood and the feature film Tesla starring Ethan Hawke. His sketch parodies on his YouTube Channel has garnered millions of views. Most recently, Damaine expanded his role as an Award-Winning TV Director for his work writing, producing, directing and starring in the independent pilot Up North, which the project won Best Actor, Best Pilot, Best Director, and the overall Audience Award voted on by all festival attendees at SeriesFest Season 3.

== Filmography ==
Year	Title	Role	Notes
Film			
2017	48 Hours to live	Curtis	
2006	Glory Road	Willie 'Scoops' Cager	
2006	Step Up	Mac Carter	
Television			
2001	It's Showtime at the Apollo	Himself	Episode dated 30 September 2001
2002	In the Flow with Affion Crockett	Various Characters	Fox Television
2005	Law & Order: Trial by Jury	Ken Jackson	Season 1, episode 6 - "Pattern of Conduct"
2006	Shark	Nelson	Season 1, episode 5 - "In the Grasp"
