= Adam Shankman =

American film director

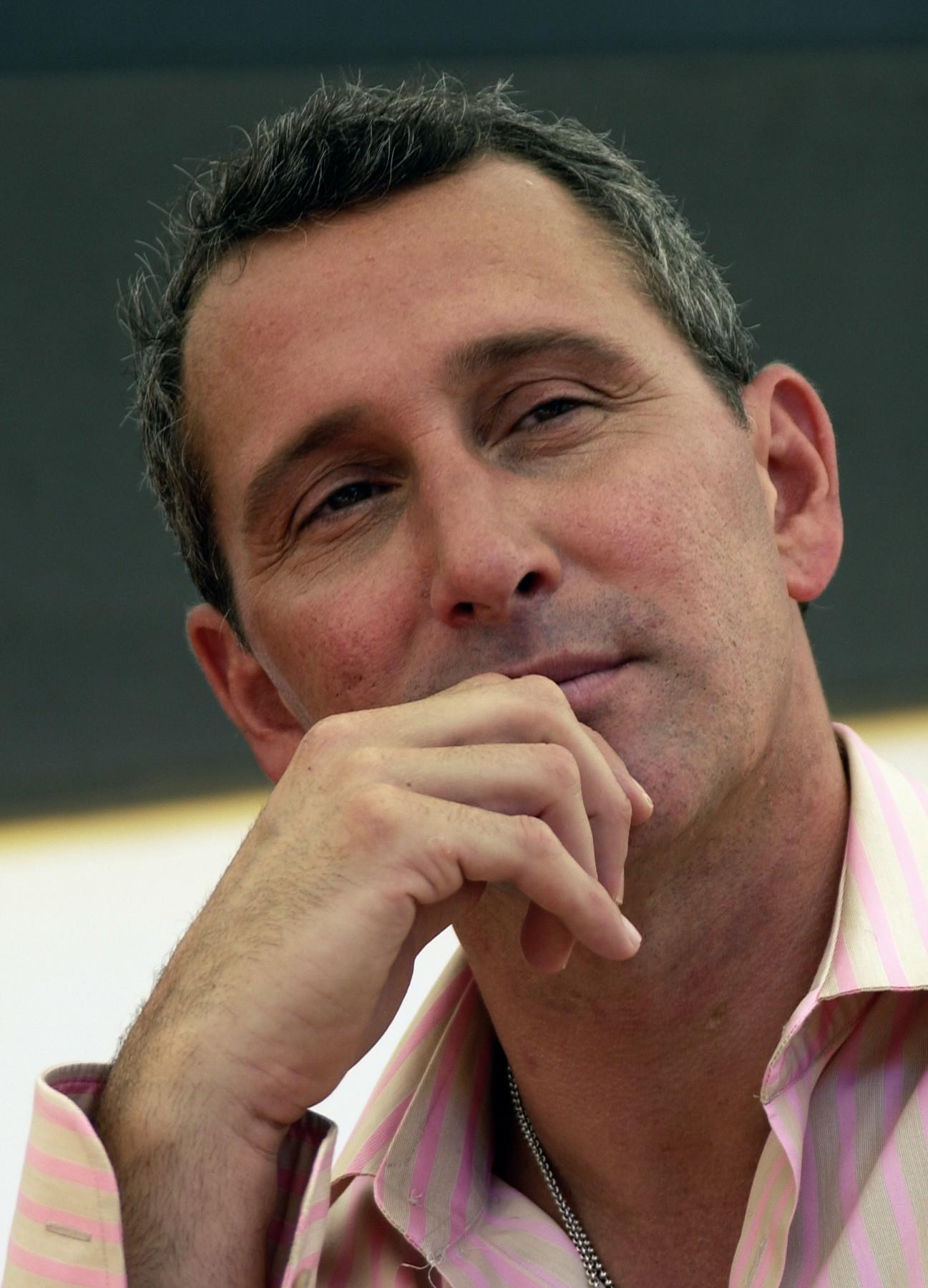
- Adam Shankman in 2007
- Born: Adam Michael Shankman; November 27, 1964 (age 61); Los Angeles, California, U.S.
- Education: Juilliard School (attended)
- Occupations: Film director, producer, writer, dancer, author, actor, choreographer
- Years active: 1983–present

Adam Michael Shankman (born November 27, 1964) is an American film director, producer, writer, dancer, author, actor, and choreographer. He was a permanent judge on seasons 6–7 of the television program So You Think You Can Dance. He began his professional career in musical theater and was a dancer in music videos for Paula Abdul and Janet Jackson. Shankman has choreographed dozens of films and directed several feature-length films, including A Walk to Remember, Bringing Down the House, The Pacifier, and the musicals Hairspray, Rock of Ages and Disenchanted.

His company, Offspring Entertainment (which he co-owns with his sister), produces films and television for various studios and networks.

Shankman is also currently co-writing young adult novels for Simon & Schuster imprint Atheneum Books for Young Readers. The books, co-written with author Laura Lee Sullivan, follow the story of rags to riches Lucille O'Malley as she becomes Hollywood's "it girl", navigating a murder mystery and meeting her match, Frederick van der Waals.

== Early life ==
Shankman was born in Los Angeles to an upper-middle-class Jewish family. He is the son of Phyllis (née Perper), a licensed practitioner in Gestalt therapy, and Ned Shankman, an entertainment lawyer and manager for such acts as Barry White, the American band X, and Sister Sledge. His sister, Jennifer Shankman-Gibgot, was born when Shankman was four years old. He attended Palisades High School before attending Juilliard School.

== Career ==
=== Early career ===
After graduating from Palisades, Shankman was a performing intern and junior company member of the prestigious Children's Theatre Company in Minneapolis. Having been accepted for both dancing and acting at Juilliard, he chose dance as his major without having any previous formal training. He dropped out of college to dance in musical theater and at nineteen he was cast in his first professional show, West Side Story, at the esteemed Michigan Opera Theater.

Shankman moved back to Los Angeles and started dancing in music videos. He was a dancer in Janet Jackson's "Alright" video, as well as in an MC Skat Kat video with Paula Abdul. Shankman broke into professional choreography in a 1989 music video for rapper MC Shan with director Julien Temple. When the hired choreographer fell through, Shankman lied and said that he had done choreography for Janet Jackson and Paula Abdul. He was hired on the spot without his story being verified. As a choreographer, he worked with acts including Tony! Toni! Toné!, The Time, Whitney Houston and Aaron Neville. In 1996 he won a Bob Fosse Award for Best Choreography in a Commercial. On television, he was a go-to choreographer on Friends and The Ellen DeGeneres Show. He served as a choreographer and dance consultant on dozens of movies including Addams Family Values, Catch Me If You Can, George of the Jungle and Boogie Nights.

In 1998 Shankman wrote and directed Cosmo's Tale, a non-dialogue short film that appeared at the Sundance Film Festival. Following the short, his sister, Jennifer, asked him to read a script that she had already set up with Fine Line Features, entitled The Wedding Planner. He liked the script and this led to a meeting with execs. He was hired for the job of director ten minutes into the meeting. The movie eventually went to Columbia Pictures and was a box office success.

=== Directing career ===
Following The Wedding Planner, Shankman went on to direct seven more studio films: A Walk to Remember, Cheaper by the Dozen 2, Bringing Down the House, The Pacifier, the 2007 award-winning film Hairspray, Walt Disney Studios Motion Pictures' Bedtime Stories, and the movie based on the musical of the same name, Rock of Ages. In 2019 he directed What Men Want, starring Taraji P. Henson for Paramount Pictures.

Shankman also helmed Walt Disney Pictures' Disenchanted, the sequel to Enchanted, starring Amy Adams.

In 2026, Shankman directed Stop! That! Train!.

Shankman has directed commercial campaigns for Macy's, Marshalls and Schick, as well as primetime television pilots and shows, including Being Mary Jane, Glee, AJ and the Queen, Step Up: High Water and Modern Family. He has directed several shorts for Funny or Die, including "Prop 8 - The Musical" starring Jack Black and written by composer Marc Shaiman. According to Time magazine, "Prop 8 - The Musical" was Marc Shaiman's attempt to pick apart the anti-gay marriage lobby's logic. Lending support to the cause were actors Jack Black, John C. Reilly, Maya Rudolph, Craig Robinson, Neil Patrick Harris and Allison Janney.

In 2012, Shankman directed a dual campaign to attract young voters for Rock the Vote and Funny or Die.

In June 2017, he directed the pilot for Step Up, a gritty teen drama series produced by Lionsgate Television and YouTube Red.

=== Producing career ===
In addition to directing, Shankman has produced various studio films with his sister Jennifer Gibgot, through their company Offspring Entertainment. These include Touchstone Pictures' Step Up, which helped launch the careers of Channing Tatum and Jenna Dewan; Premonition, starring Sandra Bullock; Bedtime Stories for Walt Disney Studios Motion Pictures; 17 Again, starring Zac Efron; The Last Song, starring Miley Cyrus and Liam Hemsworth; and Going the Distance, starring Justin Long and Drew Barrymore. Shankman also served as producer of the Step Up franchise.

In 2009, Shankman produced Carrie Underwood: An All-Star Holiday Special, with Executive Producer Nigel Lythgoe.

With Bill Mechanic, Shankman was one of the two producers of the 82nd Academy Awards, which took place on March 7, 2010. The telecast earned a record 12 Primetime Emmy Award nominations, including two for Shankman, for Best Choreography and Co-Producing.

Offspring Entertainment, in addition to having several feature films on the development slate, has a deal with Warner Bros. Television and Warner Horizon, and is currently developing television series and events for both network and cable.

Shankman also serves as an executive producer on YouTube Premium and Lionsgate Television series Step Up. He also directed the pilot episode. The third season of the series aired on Starz Encore in 2022. In May 2021, Shankman announced that he would serve as an executive producer for Hocus Pocus 2.

=== Theater and stage ===
In August 2014, Shankman directed and choreographed a production of Hair at the Hollywood Bowl. Zach Woodlee assisted Shankman in choreography and Lon Hoyt served as music director. The show presented an all-star cast including Benjamin Walker as Berger, Kristen Bell as Sheila and Hunter Parrish as Claude. Other cast members included Sarah Hyland, Jenna Ushkowitz, Mario, Kevin Chamberlin, Beverly D'Angelo and Amber Riley. As is customary with the annual Bowl musicals, the Hair cast had fewer than 14 days to get the semi-staged show up and running.Shankman and his team had the task of teaching dialogue, choreography, music and lyrics for over forty numbers to a cast of thirty, in just ten days before going on to dress rehearsals. The cast and crew had only two dress rehearsals before going live to a crowd of 11,000 people. The show garnered positive reviews, including one from BroadwayWorld.com: "Overall, Shankman's production of HAIR for the Hollywood Bowl is definitely a must-see event this weekend. Steeped in dazzling visuals, fun music, high-energy choreography, and a cast of talented, staggeringly gorgeous youngsters with giddiness coming out of every pore, this musical celebration of peace, love, and happiness deserves your attention."

In 2015, Warner Bros. Theater Ventures started developing a musical version of the 2009 movie 17 Again, which was directed by Burr Steers and produced by Shankman and Gibgot. The show was workshopped in New York's theater district, with a run planned for the near future. The musical is being produced by Warner Bros. Theater Ventures, Mark Kaufman and Adam Shankman.

=== So You Think You Can Dance ===
Shankman was a judge and choreographer on seasons 3–10 of the Fox Broadcasting reality show So You Think You Can Dance. He used the term "lyrical hip-hop" to describe the dance style associated with the choreography duo of Napoleon and Tabitha D'umo. The term is popularly credited to him, as reported in the May/June 2009 issue of Dance Spirit magazine.

== Charitable work ==
Shankman has donated time and funds to numerous charitable and political foundations. He actively promotes charitable causes by producing live events and galas, utilizing social media, participating in PSAs, speaking engagements and personal appearances. These charities include AIDS Project Los Angeles, Mountains AIDS Foundation, Feeding America, the Elizabeth Taylor AIDS Foundation, Point Foundation, GO Campaign, Special Olympics and Motion Picture and Television Fund. He teaches classes and mentors students for Ghetto Film School and has appeared at events for Operation Smile.

Shankman serves on the board of The Trevor Project and co-founded the DizzyFeet Foundation with his friend Nigel Lythgoe. This was founded in 2009 to support, improve, and increase access to dance education in the United States by providing grants to after school dance and arts programs in low income areas and rewarding scholarships to talented dancers across the country. The foundation is the biggest supporter and trailblazer for National Dance Day, hosting various events every July across the United States.

== Personal life ==
Shankman is gay.

He officiated the wedding of actors Freddie Prinze Jr. and Sarah Michelle Gellar, a good friend of his with whom he worked while choreographing Buffy the Vampire Slayer. He got the Buffy job based on Gellar's recommendation to the show's creator, Joss Whedon.

Shankman danced on the 62nd Oscars telecast in 1990, and exactly 20 years later was a producer and choreographer at the 82nd Oscars. At the 1990 Oscars, Shankman danced in the number "Under the Sea", where he met his best friend (a dancer in the same number), director and choreographer Anne Fletcher. A star in the Hercules constellation was nicknamed after Shankman in the International Star Registry.

== Filmography ==
=== Film ===
Year	Title	Director	Executive producer
2001	The Wedding Planner	Yes	No
2002	A Walk to Remember	Yes	No
2003	Bringing Down the House	Yes	No
2005	The Pacifier	Yes	Yes
2005	Cheaper by the Dozen 2	Yes	Yes
2007	Hairspray	Yes	Yes
2008	Bedtime Stories	Yes	Yes
2012	Rock of Ages	Yes	Yes
2019	What Men Want	Yes	Yes
2022	Disenchanted	Yes	Yes
2026	Stop! That! Train!	Yes	Producer
2026	The Man with the Bag †	Yes	No

Producer

- Step Up (2006)
- Premonition (2007)
- Step Up 2: The Streets (2008)
- 17 Again (2009)
- The Last Song (2010)
- Step Up 3D (2010)
- Going the Distance (2010)
- Step Up Revolution (2012)
- Step Up: All In (2014)
- Status Update (2018)
- Step Up: Year of the Dance (2019)
- After (2019), executive
- Hocus Pocus 2 (2022), executive

=== Television ===
Year	Title	Director	Executive Producer	Notes
2002	Monk	Yes	No	Episode "Mr. Monk and the Earthquake"
2003	Splitsville	Yes	No	TV movie
2004	Mystery Girl	Yes	No	TV short
2006	Worst Week of My Life	Yes	No	Pilot episode
2009	Carrie Underwood: An All-Star Holiday Special	Yes	Yes	TV special
2010–2011	Glee	Yes	No	Episodes "The Rocky Horror Glee Show" and "Pot o' Gold"
2011	Modern Family	Yes	No	Episode "Our Children, Ourselves"
2018–2022	Step Up	Yes	Yes	Pilot episode
2020	AJ and the Queen	Yes	No	Episode "Little Rock"
2023	Only Murders in the Building	Yes	No	Episodes "Grab Your Hankies" and "The White Room"

Producer

- The 82nd Annual Academy Awards (2010)

=== Acting credits ===
Year	Title	Role	Notes
1983	The Wind in the Willows	Washerwoman	
1983	The Red Shoes	Shoe shoppe customer	
1990	Rockula	Driver	
1990	Midnight Cabaret	Waiter	
1992	The Gun in Betty Lou's Handbag	Timid man	
1995	Monster Mash: The Movie	Wolfie	
1997	Scream 2	Ghost dancer	
2002	A Walk to Remember	Medical assistant	Uncredited
2003	Stuck on You	Waiter	
2005	The Pacifier	Driving instructor	Uncredited
2005	Cheaper by the Dozen 2	Clam bake chef	
2006	Step Up	Nightclub dancer	
2007	Hairspray	Talent agent	
2013	Hell's Kitchen	Red team's chef's table guest	Episode "15 Chefs Compete"

=== Choreographer ===
Year	Title	Notes
1992	The Gun in Betty Lou's Handbag	
1992	Roundhouse	
1993	Weekend at Bernie's II	
1993	Heart and Souls	Credited as Adam Schenkman
1993	Addams Family Values	
1994	The Flintstones	
1994	Milk Money	
1994	Don Juan DeMarco	
1995	Miami Rhapsody	
1995	Tank Girl	
1995	Casper	
1995	Congo	
1996	Mrs. Winterbourne	
1997	The Relic	
1997	Friends	Episode "The One with All the Jealousy"
1997	Traveller	
1997	George of the Jungle	
1997	Boogie Nights	
1997	A Life Less Ordinary	
1997	Anastasia	Credited as Adam M. Shankman
1997	Scream 2	
1998	Almost Heroes	
1998	Antz	
1999	She's All That	
1999	Blast from the Past	
1999	Forces of Nature	
1999	The Out-of-Towners	
1999	Inspector Gadget	
1999	Dudley Do-Right	
1999	Deuce Bigalow: Male Gigolo	
2000	Isn't She Great	
2000	Mission to Mars	Credited as Adam M. Shankman
2001	The Wedding Planner	
2001	Buffy the Vampire Slayer	Episode "Once More, with Feeling"
2002	Catch Me If You Can	
2003	Stuck on You	
2006	Step Up	
2007	Hairspray	Performer: "Tied Up in the Knots of Sin"
2008	Step Up 2: The Streets	
2010	The 82nd Annual Academy Awards	
2012	Rock of Ages	

=== Video short ===
Year	Title	Director	Producer	Notes
2008	Prop 8 – The Musical	Yes	Yes	Also choreographer
2009	Zac Efron's Pool Party	Yes	Yes	

=== Other credits ===
Year	Title	Role	Notes
1995	Casper	Animation department and animated ghost sequences	
1999	Inspector Gadget	Physical comedy consultant	
2002	A Walk to Remember	Executive soundtrack producer	Uncredited
2021	Dear Evan Hansen		Special thanks
2023	RuPaul's Drag Race All Stars	Guest Judge	Episode: "Joan: The Unauthorized Rusical!"
2023	RuPaul's Drag Race All Stars: Untucked!	Guest Celebrity	Episode: "Untucked! All Stars - Joan: The Unauthorized Rusical!"
