= Step Up Revolution =

2012 American film

- Theatrical release poster
- Directed by: Scott Speer
- Written by: Amanda Brody
- Based on: Characters by Duane Adler
- Produced by: Adam Shankman; Jennifer Gibgot; Patrick Wachsberger; Erik Feig
- Starring: Ryan Guzman; Kathryn McCormick; Misha Gabriel; Cleopatra Coleman; Stephen "tWitch" Boss; Tommy Dewey; Peter Gallagher
- Cinematography: J. Michael Muro
- Edited by: Matthew Friedman; Avi Youabian
- Music by: Aaron Zigman
- Production company: Offspring Entertainment
- Distributed by: Summit Entertainment
- Release date: July 27, 2012 (United States)
- Running time: 99 minutes
- Country: United States
- Language: English
- Budget: $33 million
- Box office: $140.4 million

Step Up Revolution (released in some countries as Step Up 4: Miami Heat) is a 2012 American dance film directed by Scott Speer and written by Amanda Brody. The film is the sequel to Step Up 3D (2010) and the fourth installment in the Step Up film series. It stars Ryan Guzman, Kathryn McCormick, Misha Gabriel, Cleopatra Coleman, Stephen "tWitch" Boss, Tommy Dewey, and Peter Gallagher.

Step Up Revolution was released in the United States on July 27, 2012, by Summit Entertainment, through conventional 2D and 3D formats. It became the first film in the series to not be co-produced by Touchstone Pictures nor distributed by Walt Disney Studios Motion Pictures and the first film to be released by Summit after being acquired by Lions Gate Entertainment in January 2012. The film grossed $140.4 million against a production budget of $33 million, but received mixed reviews from critics, who criticized the plot but praised the dance sequences.

The sequel Step Up: All In was released in August 2014 in the United States.

== Plot ==
In Miami, a flash mob, later identified as "The Mob", shuts down Ocean Drive briefly by cutting off the streets with retro convertibles and dancing on cars to music blasted by DJ Penelope. A few hours later, Sean Asa, Eddy, and Jason Hardlerson, the leaders of The Mob, watch their latest flash mob air on the television news in a restaurant kitchen of the Dimont Hotel where they work as waiters.

A few complain about their public disturbance, while others praise it. After they get off work, the group sneak into the hotel's beach club, claiming to be guests, not employees.

Meanwhile, across the club at the bar, aspiring ballerina Emily Anderson tries to get a bartender's attention but ends up preparing her own beer. Sean, who is immediately smitten by her, asks for a beer. Emily heads down to the beach to dance, resulting in a dance battle between the two, but ending with Emily suddenly running off when she sees her father's business partner.

The next day, Emily and her father William Anderson argue over breakfast at the Dimont Hotel. Sean, their waiter, immediately recognizes her, but Emily spills her orange juice to distract him. In an angry fit, Emily storms off, and Sean follows her into the hotel's ballroom, where Emily begins a fast contemporary dance, oblivious to Sean's presence.

After Emily notices Sean and warms up to him, she explains to him that she's trying to nail an audition for the prestigious Winwood Dance Academy Company. Sean advises her to incorporate faster, more interesting moves, but Emily declines, saying that there are rules.

Sean, in turn, tells Emily to break the rules, giving her an address and telling her to come there that evening. She does and finds herself at the Miami Museum of Fine Arts, where the paintings and statues come to life, which is the work of The Mob. By asking her to attend, Sean reveals to her his participation in The Mob.

The next day, Emily persuades Sean to let her take part in their next flash mob, which is scheduled to hit a restaurant the following week. Eddy immediately dislikes Emily, giving her the lead to test her. The flash mob goes well and Eddy admits that Emily did great.

Sean and Emily then take out a boat and move down the river. There, they kiss and fall sleep on the boat until morning, when they hurry back to Sean's uncle's bar, Ricky's. Ricky reveals to them that Emily's father, a building tycoon, is planning to develop the slums, destroying Ricky's bar, Sean's home, and most of the neighborhood.

Emily wants to tell The Mob who her father is, but Sean convinces not to. She leads the rest of The Mob to protest the plans, and their dance is a huge hit. Eddy finds out that Emily is William's daughter, and reveals to William that Emily is a part of the Mob.

Emily feels Sean betrayed her and he gets arrested for saving Eddy after a fight between the two. Emily had rehearsed her Winwood audition piece as a duet with Sean, but as she and Sean are estranged, she adapts the piece. Her solo performance falls flat so she fails her audition for the troupe.

Ricky bails Sean and Eddy out of jail for being caught in the flash mob, and the lifelong friends make up. They then mob the development's public announcement, with the help of members from The House of Pirates, including Moose, Vladd, Hair, and Jenny Kido.

Sean and Emily then perform the original audition piece. Seeing his daughter so happy, William decides to build the community up rather than tear it down. Sean and Emily kiss and make up, and the owner of the marketing firm that represents Nike makes a deal with the Mob to dance in their commercials.

== Cast ==
- Ryan Guzman as Sean Asa, Emily's love interest and the leader of the Mob.
- Kathryn McCormick as Emily Anderson, Sean's love interest, a gifted dancer and a Rookie member of Mob
- Misha Gabriel as Eddy, Sean's best friend who co-leads the Mob with Sean. He, Sean, and Jason work as waiters at the Dimont Hotel, but he gets fired by William for being late to work one day, which fuels his aggression towards him.
- Peter Gallagher as William "Bill" Anderson, a real-estate tycoon and Emily's father, as well as Sean and Eddy's boss.
- Stephen "tWitch" Boss as Jason Hardlerson, a member of the Mob and the Pirates who has returned to Miami after being in New York.
- Tommy Dewey as Trip, William's protegé
- Cleopatra Coleman as DJ Penelope
- Megan Boone as Claire, Sean's sister who is a single mother with a young daughter.
- Adam Sevani as Robert "Moose" Alexander III. He makes a cameo in the film when Moose gets a call from Jason to come to Miami with some of the Pirates.
- Chadd "Madd Chadd" Smith as Vladd, a member of the Pirates, who appears with Moose and Jenny Kido in the final dance scene.
- Mari Koda as Jenny Kido, who appears with Moose and the rest of The Pirates.
- Chris Scott as Hair, who appears with Moose and the rest of The Pirates.
- Celestina Aladekoba as Mob dancer
- Mia Michaels as Olivia, Emily's dance instructor

== Production technology ==
Step Up Revolution was filmed in "native" / "true 3D" without post production conversion using Red Epic cameras, Zeiss Ultra Prime and Angenieux Optimo DP Lenses and 3ality Technica TS-5 camera rigs and Stereo Image Processor (SIP) technology systems.

== Reception ==
Step Up Revolution received a 40% approval rating on the review aggregator Rotten Tomatoes based on 96 reviews, with an average rating of 5.00/10. The consensus stating: "Step Up Revolution treads familiar territory by surrounding its lively and kinetic dance sequences with a predictably generic story." It holds a rating of 43/100 on Metacritic signifying mixed or average reviews.

In its opening weekend, the film grossed $11,731,708 and was placed at No. 4 on the Box Office. The film was released in 2,567 theaters. As of November 19, 2012 the film has grossed $35,074,677 in the United States and $105,396,069 in other territories, for a total of $140,470,746 worldwide. As of November 19, 2012, it lies third in terms of worldwide box-office receipts compared to other films in the Step Up series.
