= Offspring Entertainment =

American film production company

- Company logo
- Type: Film production company
- Industry: Motion pictures
- Founded: 2004; 22 years ago
- Founder: Jennifer Gibgot; Adam Shankman
- Headquarters: Los Angeles, California, United States
- Products: Films

Offspring Entertainment is an American film production company owned by producers and siblings Jennifer Gibgot and Adam Shankman. They founded the company in 2004 after working together on the 2001 film The Wedding Planner, which Gibgot produced and Shankman directed.

Offspring Entertainment, in addition to several feature films on the development slate, has a deal with Warner Bros Television and Warner Horizon, and are currently developing television series and events for both network and cable. In the past they have had first look development deals with New Line Cinema and Walt Disney Studios Motion Pictures. Prior to opening Offspring Entertainment, Shankman was Hollywood's go-to choreographer and Gibgot worked with Tapestry Films. Gibgot got her start as a producer at Tapestry Films where she produced romantic comedy favorites The Wedding Planner and She's All That. Shankman got his start as a dancer and choreographer, teaching movie stars and television stars how to dance before branching into directing and producing.

== Filmography ==
- Step Up (2006) (with Touchstone Pictures and Summit Entertainment) - Channing Tatum, Jenna Dewan
- Premonition (2007) (with TriStar Pictures and MGM) - Sandra Bullock
- Hairspray (2007) (with New Line Cinema) - Nikki Blonsky, John Travolta, Michelle Pfeiffer, Christopher Walken, Amanda Bynes, James Marsden, Queen Latifah, Brittany Snow, Zac Efron, Elijah Kelley, Allison Janney
- Step Up 2: The Streets (2008) (with Touchstone Pictures and Summit Entertainment) - Will Kemp
- Bedtime Stories (2008) (with Walt Disney Pictures and Happy Madison Productions) - Adam Sandler
- 17 Again (2009) (with New Line Cinema) - Zac Efron, Matthew Perry, and Leslie Mann
- The Last Song (2010) (with Touchstone Pictures) - Miley Cyrus, Liam Hemsworth, Greg Kinnear
- Step Up 3D (2010) (with Touchstone Pictures and Summit Entertainment) - Adam Sevani, Alyson Stoner
- Going the Distance (2010) (with Warner Bros. and New Line Cinema) - Drew Barrymore, Christina Applegate, Justin Long
- Rock of Ages (2012) (with Warner Bros. and New Line Cinema) - Julianne Hough, Diego Boneta, Russell Brand, Paul Giamatti, Catherine Zeta-Jones, Malin Åkerman, Mary J. Blige, Alec Baldwin, and Tom Cruise
- Step Up Revolution (2012) (with Summit Entertainment) - Kathryn McCormick, Ryan Guzman, Misha Gabriel, Peter Gallagher
- Step Up: All In (2014)
- Status Update (2018)
- After (2019) (with Voltage Pictures and distributed by Aviron)
- He's All That (2021) (with Miramax)
- No Baggage (TBA) (with New Line Cinema) - Shailene Woodley
