= Erik Feig =

American film producer

- Born: Los Angeles, California, U.S.
- Occupation: Producer
- Years active: 1997–present
- Spouse: Susanna Felleman (m. 2002)
- Children: 2

Erik Feig is an American film producer. He is the CEO of the independent production company Picturestart, which he founded in 2019, and previously oversaw the film production and sales departments of Summit Entertainment, Lionsgate, and Sony Pictures. Films produced by Feig have grossed over $13 billion at the box office.

== Early life ==
Erik Feig was born in Los Angeles and raised in Westport, Connecticut. He attended Vanderbilt University for one year before taking a year off to travel and transferring to Columbia University, where he graduated with a BA in English in 1992. During his time at Columbia, he lived in East Campus and studied under Annette Insdorf, David Denby, and James S. Shapiro.

== Career ==
Feig began his career as a producer of independent films in 1997, working with Sony Pictures on films such as I Know What You Did Last Summer, I Still Know What You Did Last Summer, and Slackers. He had a producing deal with Artisan Entertainment before being recruited to run the film department at Summit Entertainment, which was solely a film sales company at the time. In 1998, Summit launched its own production department with Splendor and Kill the Man. By 2001, Feig had joined Summit as president of production and acquisitions. He became a partner in 2007.

Feig brought the Twilight book series to Summit after Paramount Pictures passed on it. Although the book had sold only 4,000 copies at the time, Feig noted its strong online following and potential to be a successful franchise for the new studio. He pursued the project and was able to make a deal with author Stephenie Meyer, securing the rights to all four books in February 2006. Summit was sold to Lionsgate for $412.5 million in 2012, and Feig was named president of production for Lionsgate Motion Picture Group.

In February 2014, Feig became co-president of Lionsgate Motion Picture Group, overseeing film production and development for the Lionsgate and Summit labels. He first learned of La La Land at the 2014 Sundance Film Festival, where he met with director Damien Chazelle, who pitched him his script for a Hollywood musical. At the time, the script was in development at Focus Features. Feig secured a $30 million budget for Lionsgate to produce the film, gambling on an original Hollywood musical. Chazelle's first film, Whiplash, had not yet been released when the deal was made.

In February 2018, it was reported that Feig would leave Lionsgate after raising enough money to launch a new company focused on youth-oriented projects, with Lionsgate expected to invest in the new company. In May 2019, Feig announced the launch of his own production company Picturestart. Scholastic granted the company access to its IP. As of 2019, Picturestart was intending to produce four to six films and four to six TV series per year. In October 2025, Feig launched the production company Arena SNK Studios, later renamed The Arena, with financial backing by Mohammed bin Salman. The goal of the company is to develop franchises based on video games, anime, and "related passionate fandom communities". Feig will serve as CEO, with former Disney film chief Sean Bailey also part of the board.

== Personal life ==
Feig married Susanna Felleman in New York City in 2002, and they live in Los Angeles with their two children.

== Filmography ==
Producer

- I Know What You Did Last Summer (1997)
- I Still Know What You Did Last Summer (1998)
- Slackers (2002)
- Wrong Turn (2003)
- Lies & Alibis (2006)
- I'll Always Know What You Did Last Summer (2006)
- Step Up (2006)
- P2 (2007)
- Step Up 2: The Streets (2008)
- Step Up 3D (2010)
- Step Up Revolution (2012)
- Step Up: All In (2014)
- Unpregnant (2020)
- Cha Cha Real Smooth (2022)
- Luckiest Girl Alive (2022)
- Am I OK? (2022)
- Theater Camp (2023)
- Sharper (2023)
- Strays (2023)
- Borderlands (2024)
- Bad Genius (2024)
- Sweethearts (2024)
- Together (2025)
- 4 Kids Walk Into a Bank (2027)
- Animorphs (TBA)
- Nightwatching (TBA)

Executive producer

- Dot the i (2003)
- Mr. & Mrs. Smith (2005)
- Wrong Turn 2: Dead End (2007)
- In the Valley of Elah (2007)
- Wrong Turn 3: Left for Dead (2009)
- Wrong Turn 4: Bloody Beginnings (2011)
- Wrong Turn 5: Bloodlines (2012)
- Wrong Turn 6: Last Resort (2014)
- Uncle Drew (2018)
- The Spy Who Dumped Me (2018)
- Chaos Walking (2021)
- Grease: Rise of the Pink Ladies (Television series) (2023)
- A Breed Apart (2025) (credited as Eric Feig)
