= Hairspray (2007 film) =

2007 film by Adam Shankman

- Theatrical release poster
- Directed by: Adam Shankman
- Screenplay by: Leslie Dixon
- Based on: Hairspray by John Waters; Hairspray by Mark O'Donnell Thomas Meehan
- Produced by: Craig Zadan; Neil Meron
- Starring: John Travolta; Michelle Pfeiffer; Christopher Walken; Amanda Bynes; James Marsden; Queen Latifah; Brittany Snow; Zac Efron; Elijah Kelley; Allison Janney; Nikki Blonsky
- Cinematography: Bojan Bazelli
- Edited by: Michael Tronick
- Music by: Marc Shaiman
- Production companies: Ingenious Media; Zadan/Meron Productions; Storyline Entertainment; Offspring Entertainment
- Distributed by: New Line Cinema (United States); Entertainment Film Distributors (United Kingdom)
- Release dates: July 10, 2007 (Mann Village Theater); July 20, 2007 (United Kingdom and United States)
- Running time: 116 minutes
- Countries: United Kingdom; United States
- Language: English
- Budget: $75 million
- Box office: $203.5 million

Hairspray is a 2007 musical romantic comedy film directed and choreographed by Adam Shankman, and written by Leslie Dixon. It is based on the 2002 stage musical by Mark O'Donnell and Thomas Meehan, which itself was based on John Waters's 1988 film. Produced by Ingenious Media and Zadan/Meron Productions, the film features an ensemble cast including John Travolta, Michelle Pfeiffer, Christopher Walken, Amanda Bynes, James Marsden, Queen Latifah, Brittany Snow, Zac Efron, Elijah Kelley, Allison Janney, and Nikki Blonsky in her feature film debut.

Set in 1962 Baltimore, Maryland, the film follows "pleasantly plump" teenager Tracy Turnblad (Blonsky) as she pursues stardom as a dancer on a local television dance show and rallies against racial segregation.

Development began in 2004, with Dixon reworking Meehan and O'Donnell's first screenplay draft to tone down the musical's campiness; by the following year, Shankman agreed to direct. The musical's composer and lyricist team, Marc Shaiman and Scott Wittman, reworked their songs for the film's soundtrack, and also wrote four new original songs. Principal photography lasted from September to December 2006 with a budget of $75 million; filming took place on locations in Toronto and Hamilton, Ontario, and on sound-stages at Toronto's Showline Studios. Recording sessions took place in San Diego, California.

Hairspray premiered at the Mann Village Theater on July 10, 2007, and was released in the United Kingdom and the United States by New Line Cinema on July 20. It achieved critical and commercial success, breaking the record for the largest opening weekend for a musical film, and ranking as the seventh-highest-grossing musical film adaptation with a worldwide gross of $203.6 million. Among its accolades, Hairspray was nominated for three Golden Globe Awards (including Best Motion Picture – Musical or Comedy), five Critics' Choice Awards (winning two), and the Screen Actors Guild Award for Outstanding Performance by a Cast in a Motion Picture.

== Plot ==
In 1962, overweight 16-year-old Tracy Turnblad lives in Baltimore. She and her shy best friend Penny Pingleton frequently watch The Corny Collins Show, a local teen dance television show broadcast live on the WYZT station. Several of the dancers on the show, including lead dancers Amber von Tussle and her boyfriend Link Larkin, attend Tracy and Penny's high school. Amber's mother Velma, the station's manager, ensures that her daughter is prominently featured and only allows African-American dancers to appear on the show's monthly "Negro Day", hosted by local R&B disc jockey "Motormouth" Maybelle Stubbs.

Corny reveals that one of the dancers on the show will be taking a nine-month leave of absence, so Link announces auditions for a replacement to be held at the WYZT studio the next day. Ecstatic, Tracy skips class to attend the audition, but Velma rejects Tracy for both her size and support of integration. While in detention for cutting class, Tracy discovers the "Negro Day" youths practicing in the detention room and befriends Maybelle's son, Seaweed.

While leaving detention, Tracy inadvertently meets Link and dreams of a life with him. At a record hop, Tracy's dance moves, taught to her by Seaweed, garner Corny's attention, so he chooses her to join the cast.

Tracy quickly becomes one of Corny's most popular performers, threatening Amber's chances of winning the show's annual "Miss Teenage Hairspray" pageant the following month and her relationship with Link, who grows fonder of Tracy. When Tracy is enlisted as the spokesgirl for a plus-size fashion boutique, she persuades her agoraphobic mother Edna to accompany her there as her agent, where both receive makeovers, sharply boosting Edna's confidence.

Tracy introduces Seaweed to Penny, and they become smitten. Later, Seaweed and his younger sister Little Inez bring Tracy, Penny, and Link to a party at Maybelle's store. Amber anonymously calls Edna and divulges Tracy's whereabouts. Edna rushes to the store and attempts to take Tracy home immediately, but Maybelle convinces her to stay and take pride in herself. After Maybelle sadly informs everyone that Velma has canceled Negro Day, Tracy suggests they march for integration. Link, unwilling to endanger his career, apologizes to Tracy and explains that he is scheduled to sing in front of talent scouts at the pageant.

Edna returns to her husband Wilbur's shop, but Velma gets there first and tries to seduce him. Though he remains impervious to Velma's advances, Edna arrives to see Velma forcing him into a compromising position and furiously storms out. After accusing Wilbur of infidelity and changing the locks, Edna forbids Tracy to be on the show, but changes her mind after reconciling with Wilbur.

The next morning, Tracy sneaks out of the house to join the protest, which is halted by a police roadblock. The protesters engage in a brawl, while Tracy runs to the Pingletons' home, where Penny hides her in a fallout shelter. However, Penny's staunchly religious mother Prudy reports Tracy to the police and ties Penny to her bed for "harboring a fugitive". Having been bailed out by Wilbur, Seaweed and his friends help Tracy and Penny escape. Link visits Tracy's house to find her, realizing that he loves her. Seaweed and Penny also acknowledge their love during the escape.

With the pageant underway, Velma assigns police officers to guard the WYZT studio to prevent Tracy from entering and rigs the pageant tallies to guarantee Amber's victory. Penny arrives at the pageant with Edna, while Wilbur, Seaweed, and the Negro Day youths help Tracy infiltrate the studio. Link breaks away from Amber to dance with Tracy; later, he pulls Inez to the stage to dance in the pageant.

Amber's attempt to reclaim her championship crown fails. Inez wins the pageant after a late surge of support, successfully integrating the program. Edna mans a camera to film Velma revealing her rigging scheme to Amber, resulting in Velma's dismissal. The set turns into a celebration as Tracy and Link cement their love by kissing.

== Cast ==
- John Travolta as Edna Turnblad, Tracy's mother who owns a laundry business, is agoraphobic and ashamed of her obesity. Travolta's casting as Edna continued the tradition of having a man in drag portray the character, going back to the 1988 film, which featured drag queen Divine as Edna, as well as to the Broadway adaptation, which featured Harvey Fierstein as Edna. Executives at New Line Cinema originally expected the part to be filled by an actor accustomed to playing comic roles, tossing around names such as Robin Williams, Steve Martin, and Tom Hanks. However, Travolta was aggressively sought after by producers Craig Zadan and Neil Meron for this role because he had starred as Danny Zuko in Grease, the second most successful movie musical to date, beaten only by Mamma Mia!.
- Michelle Pfeiffer as Velma Von Tussle, the racist and sizeist manager of station WYZT. Velma is invested in keeping her daughter Amber in the spotlight and The Corny Collins Show segregated. Hairspray was the first film featuring Pfeiffer to be released in five years. Stardust, also featuring Pfeiffer, was shot before Hairspray, but released three weeks afterwards. The peculiarity of Pfeiffer and Travolta appearing onscreen together (Travolta starred in Grease, Pfeiffer in Grease 2) was not lost on the production staff; Travolta requested that Pfeiffer play the part of the villainess.
- Queen Latifah as "Motormouth" Maybelle Stubbs, a Baltimore rhythm and blues radio DJ who hosts "Negro Day" on The Corny Collins Show. Maybelle also runs a record shop on North Avenue. Queen Latifah appeared in the successful Zadan/Meron film musical Chicago, and worked under Adam Shankman's direction in Bringing Down the House. Aretha Franklin had been previously considered for the role.
- Nikki Blonsky as Tracy Turnblad, an optimistic, overweight teenage girl who loves dancing. Tracy's racial acceptance leads her to become an active supporter for the integration of The Corny Collins Show. Hairspray was Blonsky's debut as a professional actress.
- Amanda Bynes as Penny Lou Pingleton, Tracy's best friend, a sheltered girl who falls in love with Seaweed despite the disapproval of her stern, devoutly religious and racist mother Prudy. A young actress famous for appearances on Nickelodeon TV shows and in feature films, Bynes was one of the few movie stars cast among the teen roles.
- Brittany Snow as Amber Von Tussle, Velma's bratty daughter and the lead female dancer on The Corny Collins Show. Amber becomes Tracy's enemy when she threatens both Amber's chances of winning the "Miss Teenage Hairspray" crown and her relationship with her boyfriend, Link. Snow previously worked with Shankman in The Pacifier. Hayden Panettiere was also considered for the part of Amber, but was decided against in part because of her then-upcoming work with the NBC television series Heroes.
- Christopher Walken as Wilbur Turnblad, Tracy's father, the easygoing proprietor of the "Hardy-Har Hut" joke shop below the Turnblad family's apartment. John Travolta had asked that Walken be considered for the part, and he eventually beat out Billy Crystal and Jim Broadbent for the role of Wilbur.
- James Marsden as Corny Collins, the host of The Corny Collins Show; his politically progressive attitudes lead him to fight his show's imposed segregation. Corny Collins is based upon Baltimore TV personality Buddy Deane, who hosted an eponymous local teen dance show in the late 1950s and early 1960s. Marsden beat out both Joey McIntyre and X-Men co-star Hugh Jackman for the part.
- Zac Efron as Link Larkin, Amber's boyfriend and the lead male dancer on The Corny Collins Show. Link is a talented (and mildly narcissistic) singer who becomes more attracted to Tracy. The character is based in part upon Elvis Presley. Efron, a popular teen actor who played Troy Bolton in the Disney Channel TV film High School Musical, was initially thought by Shankman to be "too Disney" for the role; however Shankman's sister, executive producer Jennifer Gibgot, convinced him to cast Efron, believing that the teen star would draw a substantial teen crowd.
- Elijah Kelley as Seaweed J. Stubbs, Maybelle's son, a skilled dancer who teaches Tracy some dance moves and falls in love with Penny. Kelley, a relative newcomer to film, overcame other auditioners and several popular R&B stars for the part of Seaweed.
- Allison Janney as Prudence "Prudy" Pingleton, Penny's mother, a racist Christian fundamentalist whose strict parenting keeps Penny from experiencing life. Her husband is serving a prison sentence for an unspecified crime.

=== Minor roles ===
- Paul Dooley as Harriman F. Spritzer, the owner of the "Ultra Clutch" company and the main sponsor of The Corny Collins Show. Although he prefers to keep The Corny Collins Show segregated, he will follow public opinion if it increases sales.
- Jerry Stiller as Mr. Pinky, the owner of a dress shop called Mr. Pinky's Hefty Hideaway, who hires Tracy as his spokesgirl. In the original film, Stiller played Wilbur Turnblad.
- Taylor Parks as Little Inez Stubbs, Maybelle's teenage daughter and Seaweed's younger sister, and a skilled dancer. Inez is based in part upon Ruby Bridges, the first black child to attend a formerly all-White school in the state of Louisiana.
- Jayne Eastwood as Miss Wimsey, Tracy's geography teacher, who gives Tracy the detention note that first leads her to Seaweed.
- George King as Mr. Flak, Amber, Link, and Tracy's history teacher. He gives Tracy detention when Amber frames Tracy for drawing a picture of him with breasts. He gives Link detention as well for coming to Tracy's defense.

=== Council members ===
- Laura Edwards as Vicky
- Becca Sweitzer as Darla
- Cassie Silva as Brenda
- Tiffany Engen as Noreen
- Brooke Leigh Engen as Doreen
- Sarah Jayne Jensen as Shelley
- Hayley Podschun as Tammy
- Nick Baga as Sketch
- Curtis Holbrook as Brad
- J.P. Ferreri as Joey
- Spencer Liff as Mikey
- Phillip Spaeth as Fender
- Tabitha Lupien as Becky
- Kelly Fletcher as Lou Ann
- Jesse Weafer as I.Q.
- Corey Gorewicz as Bix
- Joshua Feldman as Jesse
- Everett Smith as Paulie

=== The Dynamites ===
- Arike Rice
- Tanee McCall
- Nadine Ellis

=== Cameos ===
In addition to the principal actors, the film contained several cameo appearances by individuals involved in the history of Hairspray:

- John Waters (writer and director of the original film, who also cameoed as Dr. Fredrickson in the original film) as the "flasher who lives next door" during "Good Morning Baltimore"
- Ricki Lake (Tracy Turnblad in the original film) as William Morris talent agent #1. (Audio) performs "Mama, I'm a Big Girl Now".
- Adam Shankman (choreographer/director of the film) as William Morris talent agent #2. (Audio) sings "Tied Up in the Knots of Sin" with Shaiman which is heard when Prudy turns the record player on while she ties Penny up.
- Marc Shaiman (co-lyricist/writer of the film) as William Morris talent agent #3. (Audio) sings "Tied Up in the Knots of Sin" with Shankman which is heard when Prudy turns the record player on while she ties up Penny.
- Scott Wittman (co-lyricist and music writer of the film) as William Morris talent agent #4
- Anne "Mama" Fletcher (associate choreographer) as the school nurse
- Zach Woodlee (associate choreographer) as smoking teacher
- Jamal Sims (associate choreographer) as one of the dancers at Maybelle's store

=== Singing cameos ===
- Marissa Jaret Winokur (original Broadway cast's Tracy) performs "Mama, I'm a Big Girl Now".
- Harvey Fierstein (original Broadway cast's Edna) as brief singing cameo in the end credits "Mama, I'm a Big Girl Now".
- Corey Reynolds (original Broadway cast's Seaweed) as singer of "Trouble on the Line". The song is heard shortly after "Big, Blonde and Beautiful" until Maybelle announces the cancellation of Negro Day.
- Arthur Adams (one of the Broadway cast's Seaweed) performs "Boink-Boink" which is heard during "Big, Blonde and Beautiful".
- Chester Gregory (one of the Broadway cast's Seaweed) performs "Breakout", which is heard during Tracy's introduction to Seaweed in detention.
- Aimee Allen performs "Cooties".

== Musical numbers ==
"Good Morning Baltimore"
The chorus of the film's opening number, "Good Morning Baltimore", as performed by Nikki Blonsky.

1. "Good Morning Baltimore" – Tracy (Nikki Blonsky)
2. "The Nicest Kids in Town" – Corny and Council Members (James Marsden)
3. "It Takes Two" – Link (Zac Efron)
4. "(The Legend of) Miss Baltimore Crabs" – Velma and Council Members (Michelle Pfeiffer)
5. "I Can Hear the Bells" – Tracy (Nikki Blonsky)
6. "Ladies' Choice" – Link (Zac Efron)
7. "The Nicest Kids in Town (Reprise)" – Corny, Council Members, Penny, Edna, Wilbur (James Marsden)
8. "The New Girl in Town" – Amber, Tammy, Shelley, and The Dynamites (Brittany Snow)
9. "Welcome to the 60's" – Tracy, Edna, The Dynamites, and Hefty Hideaway Employees (Nikki Blonsky and John Travolta)
10. "Run and Tell That" – Seaweed, Little Inez, and Detention Kids (Elijah Kelley ft. Taylor Parks)
11. "Big, Blonde and Beautiful" – Motormouth (Queen Latifah)
12. "Big, Blonde and Beautiful (Reprise)" – Velma and Edna (Michelle Pfeiffer and John Travolta)
13. "(You're) Timeless to Me" – Wilbur and Edna (Christopher Walken and John Travolta)
14. "I Know Where I've Been" – Motormouth (Queen Latifah)
15. "Without Love" – Link, Tracy, Seaweed, Penny, and Detention Kids (Zac Efron, Nikki Blonsky, Elijah Kelley, Amanda Bynes)
16. "(It's) Hairspray" – Corny and Council Members (James Marsden)
17. "You Can't Stop the Beat" – Company (Nikki Blonsky, Zac Efron, Amanda Bynes, Elijah Kelley, John Travolta and Queen Latifah)
18. "Come So Far (Got So Far to Go)" (end credits) – (Queen Latifah, Zac Efron, Nikki Blonsky, and Elijah Kelley)
19. "Mama, I'm a Big Girl Now" (end credits) – Ricki Lake, Marissa Jaret Winokur, and Nikki Blonsky with Harvey Fierstein
20. "Cooties" (end credits) – Aimee Allen

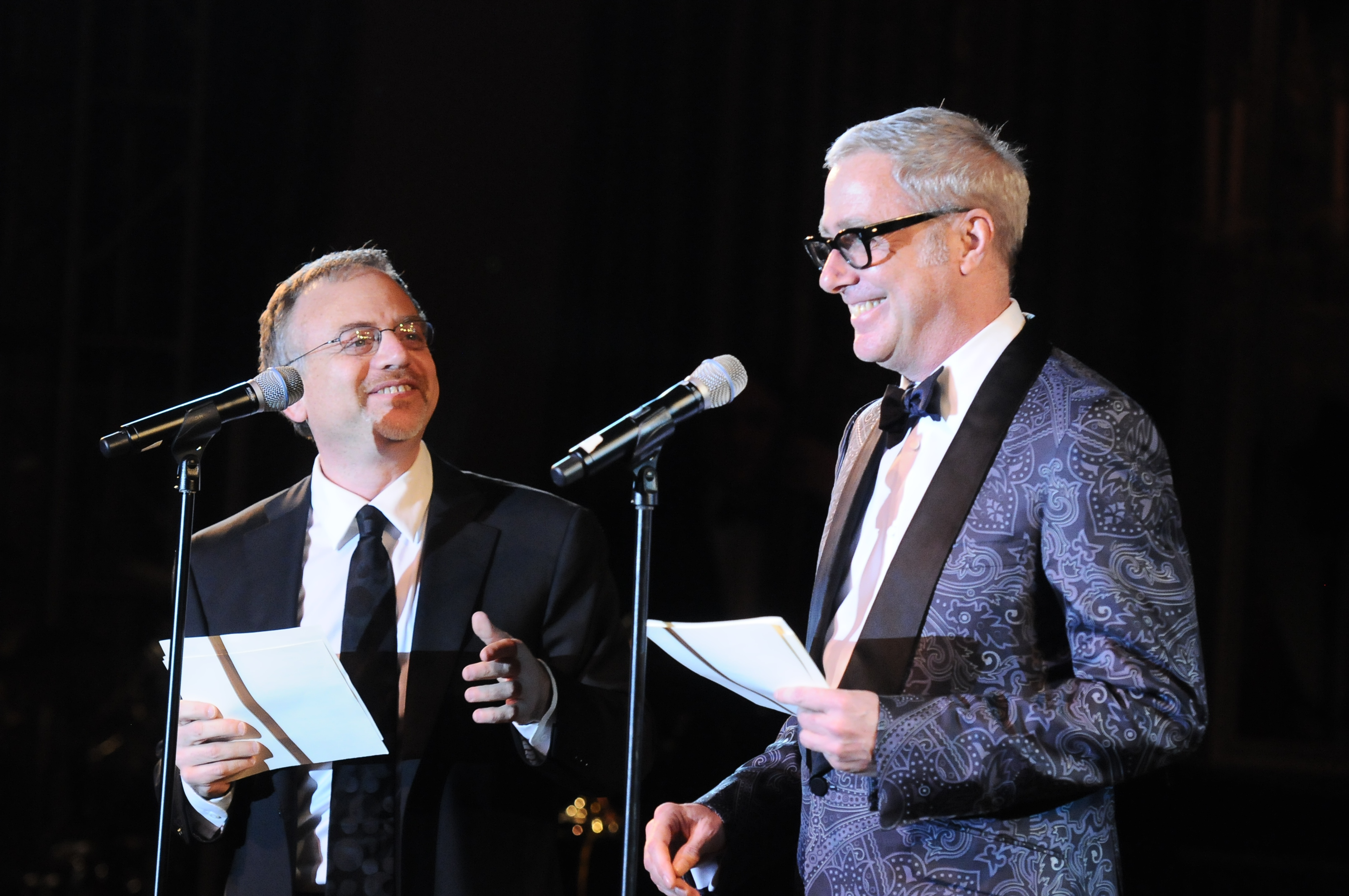
Songwriters Marc Shaiman and Scott Wittman.

Music producer/composer/co-lyricist Marc Shaiman and co-lyricist Scott Wittman were required to alter their Broadway Hairspray song score in various ways in order to work on film, from changing portions of the lyrics in some songs (e.g., "(The Legend of) Miss Baltimore Crabs", "Big, Blonde, and Beautiful", and "You Can't Stop the Beat") to more or less completely removing other songs from the film altogether.

"Mama, I'm a Big Girl Now", a popular number from the stage musical, features Tracy, Penny, and Amber arguing with their respective mothers. Neither Shankman nor Dixon could come up with a solution for filming "Mama" that did not require a three-way split screen — something they wanted to avoid — and both felt the number did not adequately advance the plot. As a result, "Mama" was reluctantly dropped from the film during pre-production, although it is used by Shaiman as an instrumental number when the Corny Collins kids dance the "Stricken Chicken". A special version of "Mama" was recorded for the film's end credits in May 2007, during the final score recording process, which featured vocals from each of the three women most famous for portraying Tracy Turnblad: Ricki Lake from the 1988 film, Marissa Jaret Winokur from the original Broadway cast, and Nikki Blonsky from the 2007 film. Harvey Fierstein, who portrayed Edna as part of the original Broadway cast, has a brief cameo moment in the end credits version of "Mama" as well.

"It Takes Two", a solo for Link, was moved from its place in the stage musical (on Tracy's first day on The Corny Collins Show) to an earlier Corny Collins scene, although only the coda of the song is used in the final release print, and the song's background music can be heard immediately after the reprise of "The Nicest Kids in Town". "Cooties", a solo for Amber in the stage musical, is present in this film as an instrumental during the Miss Teenage Hairspray dance-off. As with "Mama, I'm a Big Girl Now", a version of "Cooties", performed in a contemporary pop rendition by Aimee Allen, is present during the end credits.

The performance of a vintage dance called The Madison, present in both the 1988 film and the stage musical, was replaced for this version by a newly composed song, "Ladies' Choice". Portions of the Madison dance steps were integrated into the choreography for the musical number "You Can't Stop the Beat", and the song to which the dance is performed on Broadway can be heard during Motormouth Maybelle's platter party in the film, re-titled "Boink-Boink". "The Big Dollhouse", "Velma's Revenge" (a reprise of "Miss Baltimore Crabs"), and the reprise of "Good Morning Baltimore" were the only numbers from the musical not used in the film in any way.

Shaiman and Wittman composed two new songs for the 2007 film: "Ladies' Choice", a solo for Link, and "Come So Far (Got So Far to Go)", a song performed during the end credits by Queen Latifah, Blonsky, Efron, and Kelley. Another "new" song in the 2007 film, "The New Girl in Town", had originally been composed for the Broadway musical, but was deemed unnecessary and discarded from the musical. Director Shankman decided to use the song to both underscore a rise-to-fame montage for Tracy and to showcase Maybelle's "Negro Day", which is never actually seen in either of the earlier incarnations of Hairspray.

One additional Shaiman/Wittman song, a ballad entitled "I Can Wait", was composed for the film as a solo for Tracy, meant to replace the stage musical's reprise of "Good Morning Baltimore". "I Can Wait" was shot for the film (Tracy performs the number while locked in Prudy's basement), but was eventually deleted from the final release print. The audio recording of "I Can Wait" was made available as a special bonus track for customers who pre-ordered the Hairspray soundtrack on iTunes, and the scene itself was included as a special feature on the film's DVD release.

Post-production took place in Los Angeles. Composer/co-lyricist Shaiman continued work on the film's music, employing the Hollywood Symphony Orchestra to record instrumentation for both the songs and the incidental score.

== Production ==
=== Early development ===
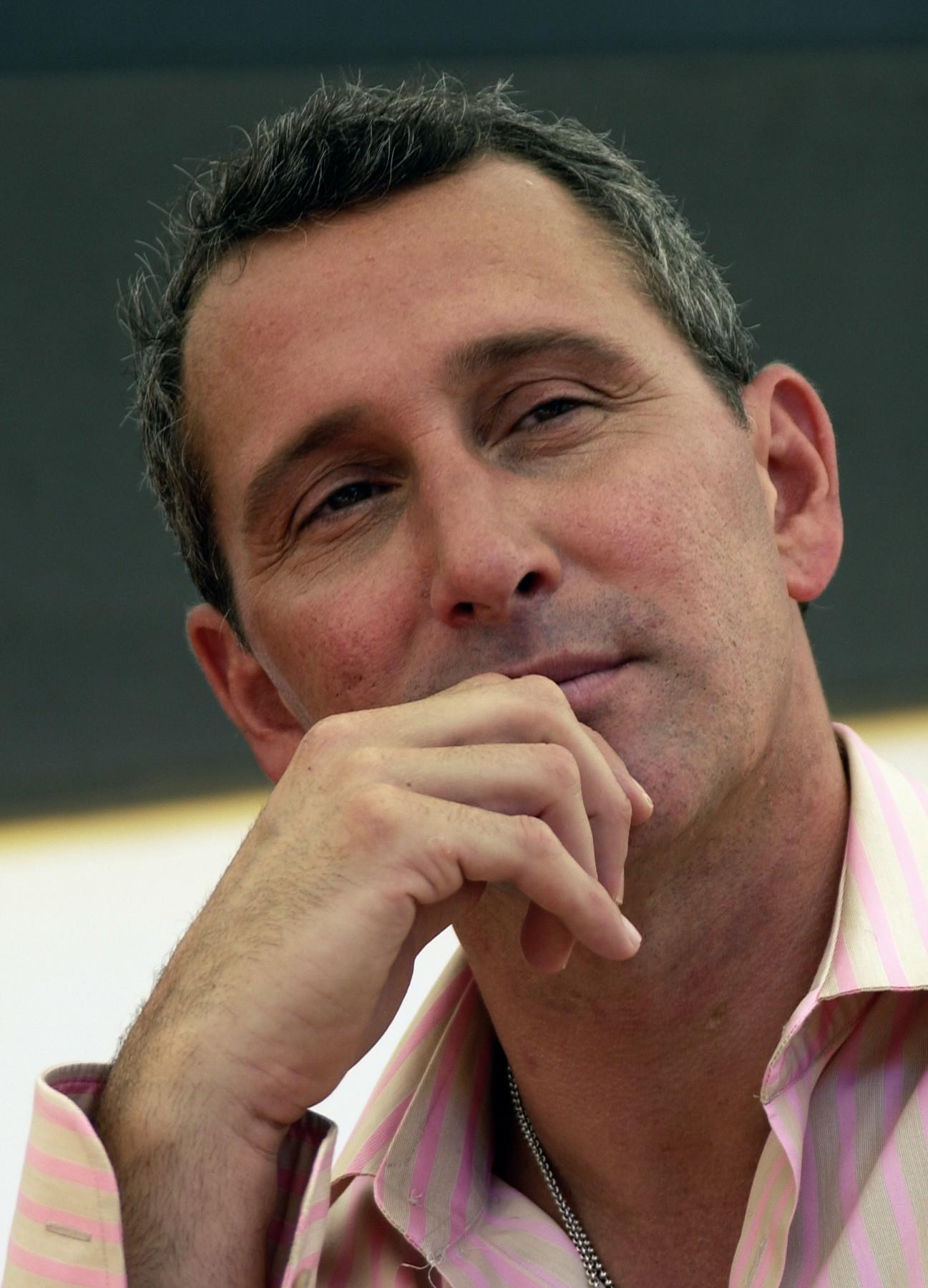
Adam Shankman, director and choreographer of the film.

Following the success of the Broadway musical of the same name, which won eight Tony Awards in 2003, New Line Cinema, who owned the rights to the 1988 John Waters film upon which the stage musical is based, became interested in adapting the stage show as a musical film. Development work began in late 2004, while a similarly film-to-Broadway-to-film project, Mel Brooks' The Producers, was in production.

Craig Zadan and Neil Meron, the executive producers of the Academy Award-winning film adaptation of the Broadway musical Chicago, were hired as the producers for Hairspray, and began discussing possibly casting John Travolta and Billy Crystal (or Jim Broadbent) as Edna and Wilbur Turnblad, respectively. Thomas Meehan and Mark O'Donnell, authors of the book for the stage musical, wrote the first draft of the film's screenplay, but were replaced by Leslie Dixon, screenwriter for family comedies such as Mrs. Doubtfire and Freaky Friday. After a year's deliberation on who should direct the film, Zadan and Meron finally decided to hire Adam Shankman to both direct and choreograph Hairspray. Upon learning he had been hired, Shankman arranged a meeting with John Waters, who advised him "don't do what I did, don't do what the play did. You've gotta do your own thing". Despite this, Shankman still noted "all roads of Hairspray lead back to John Waters".

=== Adaptation changes ===
Dixon was primarily hired to tone down much of the campiness inherent in the stage musical. The 2007 film's script is based primarily on the stage musical rather than the 1988 film, so several changes already made to the plot for the stage version remain in this version. These include dropping several characters from the 1988 version (such as Arvin Hodgepile (the role Mr. Spritzer fills), Velma's husband Franklin, Corny's assistant Tammy, the beatniks, et al.), removing the Tilted Acres amusement park from the story, and placing Velma in charge of the station where The Corny Collins Show is filmed.

One notable difference between the stage musical, the original film, and the 2007 film version of Hairspray is that Tracy does not go to jail in the 2007 version (thus eliminating the musical's song "The Big Dollhouse"). In both previous incarnations of Hairspray, Tracy is arrested and taken to jail along with the other protesters. Edna is presented in this version as an insecure introvert, in contrast to the relatively bolder incarnations present in the 1988 film and the stage musical. Among many other elements changed or added to this version are the removal of Motormouth Maybelle's habit of speaking in rhyming jive talk and doubling the number of teens in Corny Collins' Council (from ten on Broadway to twenty in the 2007 film).

Dixon restructured portions of Hairspray's book to allow several of the songs to blend more naturally into the plot, in particular "(You're) Timeless to Me" and "I Know Where I've Been". "(You're) Timeless to Me" becomes the anchor of a newly invented subplot involving Velma's attempt to break up Edna and Wilbur's marriage and keep Tracy off The Corny Collins Show as a result. The song now serves as Wilbur's apology to Edna, in addition to its original purpose in the stage musical as a tongue-in-cheek declaration of Wilbur and Edna's love for each other. Meanwhile, "I Know Where I've Been", instead of being sung by Maybelle to the kids after being let out of jail, now underscores Maybelle's march on WYZT (which takes place in the stage musical at the end of "Big, Blonde, and Beautiful").

=== Pre-production and casting ===
Hairspray was produced on a budget of $75 million. Casting director, David Rubin, introduced an open casting call to cast unknowns in Atlanta, New York City, and Chicago. After auditioning over eleven hundred candidates, Nikki Blonsky, a high school student from Great Neck, New York was chosen for the lead role of Tracy. Blonsky auditioned for the role of Tracy Turnblad in New York City in 2006 at seventeen years old. She had no previous professional experience in acting or in singing. Blonsky had auditioned for the role because it became her dream to play the role of Tracy after seeing the musical on Broadway. Blonsky, working at Cold Stone Creamery at the time, received the news from film director, Adam Shankman, that she had received the part. Relative unknowns Elijah Kelley and Taylor Parks were chosen through similar audition contests to portray siblings Seaweed and Little Inez Stubbs, respectively. John Travolta was finally cast as Edna, with Christopher Walken ultimately assuming the role of Wilbur. Several other stars, including Queen Latifah, James Marsden, Michelle Pfeiffer, and Allison Janney were chosen for the other supporting adult roles of Motormouth Maybelle, Corny Collins, Velma Von Tussle, and Prudy Pingleton, respectively. Teen stars Amanda Bynes, and Zac Efron were cast as Tracy's friends Penny and Link, and Brittany Snow was cast as her rival, Amber Von Tussle. Jerry Stiller, who played Wilbur Turnblad in the original film, appears as plus-sized women's clothes retailer Mr. Pinky in this version.

Choreography was a central part of the production, with Shankman working alongside four associate choreographers: Jamal Sims, Anne Fletcher, Zach Woodlee and Joey Pizzi. The cast and more than 150 dancers undertook two months of rehearsals before filming. According to a 2007 Los Angeles Times report, Shankman auditioned approximately 3,000 dancers and developed 20 dance numbers for the film. The musical sequences sometimes employed as many as five cameras, allowing the choreography to incorporate more athletic movement and greater use of space than would be practical in a continuous stage performance.

The cast recorded the vocal tracks for their songs under the guidance of Elaine Overholt in the weeks before principal photography began in September.

=== Principal photography ===
Principal photography took place in Toronto, and Hamilton, Ontario, Canada from September 5 to December 8, 2006.

Hairspray is explicitly set in Baltimore, Maryland and the original 1988 film had been shot on location there, but the 2007 film was shot primarily in Toronto because the city was better equipped with the sound stages necessary to film a musical. The opening shots of the descent from the clouds and the newspaper being dropped onto the stoop are the only times that the actual city of Baltimore is shown in the film.

Most of the film was shot at Toronto's Showline Studios. Most of the street scenes were shot at the intersection of Dundas Street West and Roncesvalles Avenue. A PCC streetcar with Toronto Transit Commission livery is seen in the opening sequence. Some of the signs for the 1960s-era stores remain up along the street. Toronto's Lord Lansdowne Public School was used for all of the high school exteriors and some of the interiors, while the old Queen Victoria School in Hamilton was also used for interiors. Scenes at Queen Victoria were shot from November 22 to December 2, and the school was scheduled to be demolished after film production was completed. As of the 2017–2018 school year, there are no plans to close this school.

Thinner than most of the other men who have portrayed Edna, Travolta appeared onscreen in a large fat suit, and required four hours of makeup in order to appear before the cameras. His character's nimble dancing style belies her girth; Shankman based Edna's dancing style on the hippo ballerinas in the Dance of the Hours sequence in Walt Disney's 1940 animated feature, Fantasia. Although early versions of the suit created "a dumpy, Alfred Hitchcock version of Edna"; Travolta fought for the ability to give his character curves and a thick Baltimore accent. Designed by Tony Gardner, the fat suit was created using lightweight synthetic materials, consisting of layered pads and silicone, which was used from the chest upwards. The suit provided the additional benefit of covering Travolta's beard, eliminating the problem of his facial hair growing through his makeup midday.

=== Shankman's inspirations ===
Shankman included a number of references to films that influenced his work on Hairspray:

- The film's opening shot – a bird's-eye view of Baltimore that eventually descends from the clouds to ground level – is a combination of the opening shots of West Side Story and The Sound of Music.
- Before we see a full shot of Tracy, we see individual shots of her upraised right and left arms. This is reminiscent of our first views of Sadie Thompson (Joan Crawford) in the 1932 film Rain.
- Several scenes involving Tracy, such as her ride atop the garbage truck during the "Good Morning Baltimore" number and her new hairstyle during "Welcome to the '60s", are directly inspired by the Barbra Streisand musical film version of Funny Girl.
- During "Without Love", Link sings to a photograph of Tracy, which comes to life and sings harmony with him. This is directly inspired from the MGM musical The Broadway Melody of 1938, in which a young Judy Garland swoons over a photo of actor Clark Gable as she sings "You Made Me Love You".
- The dress that Penny wears during "You Can't Stop the Beat" is made from her bedroom curtains, which can be seen during "Without Love". This is homage to The Sound of Music, where Maria uses old curtains to make play clothes for the von Trapp children.

== Release ==
=== Home media ===
Hairspray was released on DVD and Blu-ray on November 20, 2007, by New Line Home Entertainment. An HD DVD version of the film was originally slated for release in 2008, but was canceled due to New Line Cinema's decision that it would be a Blu-ray exclusive.

=== Television ===
USA Network purchased the cable broadcast rights to Hairspray and was scheduled to debut the film in February 2010, but in the end, it did not broadcast that month. The film eventually premiered on July 24, 2010, with USA's sister channel Bravo also showing it multiple times. In February 2011, Hairspray made its network television debut on ABC.

== Reception ==
=== Box office ===
Hairspray debuted in 3,121 theaters in North America on July 20, 2007, the widest debut of any modern movie musical. The film earned $27.5 million in its opening weekend at #3, behind I Now Pronounce You Chuck and Larry and Harry Potter and the Order of the Phoenix. This made Hairspray the record-holder for the biggest opening weekend for a movie based on a Broadway musical. This record was later broken by the release of Mamma Mia!, which grossed $27.8 million on its opening weekend. Hairspray is currently the twelfth highest grossing musical in U.S. cinema history, surpassing The Rocky Horror Picture Show ($145 million) and Dreamgirls ($103 million), released seven months prior. Ending its domestic run on October 25, 2007, Hairspray has a total domestic gross of $118.9 million and $202.5 million worldwide. Its biggest overseas markets include the United Kingdom ($25.8 million), Australia ($14.4 million), Japan ($8 million), Italy ($4.6 million), France ($3.9 million) and Spain ($3.8 million). At the time, this made Hairspray the third musical film in history to cross $200 million internationally, behind 1978's hit Grease ($395 million) and 2002's Chicago ($307 million). It is the seventh highest-grossing PG-rated film of 2007, and has grossed more than other higher-budgeted summer releases like Ocean's Thirteen ($117 million) and Evan Almighty ($100 million).

Two weeks after its original release, new "sing-along" prints of Hairspray were shipped to theaters. These prints featured the lyrics to each song printed onscreen as subtitles, encouraging audiences to interact with the film. On January 4, 2008, Hairspray was re-released in New York City and Los Angeles for one week because John Travolta was present for Q&A and autographs.

=== Critical reception ===
The film received positive reviews upon release. Hairspray has garnered acclaim from film critics such as Roger Ebert, The New York Times, and The Boston Globe, as well as a smaller number of reviews comparing it unfavorably to the Waters original. The film is one of the top picks on Metacritic, with an average of 81 from 37 critics. On review aggregator Rotten Tomatoes, the film has an approval rating of 92% based on 216 reviews, with an average rating of 7.8/10, making it one of 2007's best-reviewed films. The site's consensus reads: "Hairspray is an energetic, wholly entertaining musical romp; a fun Summer movie with plenty of heart. Its contagious songs will make you want to get up and start dancing". Audiences polled by CinemaScore gave the film an average grade of "A" on an A+ to F scale. Peter Rainer of The Christian Science Monitor named it the fourth best film of 2007.

Ebert gave the film 3.5 stars out of 4, saying that there was "a lot of craft and slyness lurking beneath the circa-1960s goofiness", also stating that "The point, however, is not the plot but the energy. Without somebody like Nikki Blonsky at the heart of the movie, it might fall flat, but everybody works at her level of happiness". Ebert also noted that this film is "a little more innocent than Waters would have made it". Krishna Shenoi, of the Shenoi Chronicle, called the movie "Shankman's masterpiece", saying that it moved away from his previous works into a different direction, making a light comedy that deals with serious issues maturely. Shenoi also said that the film was everything he wanted Grease to be. New York Daily News critic Jack Matthews called the film "A great big sloppy kiss of entertainment for audiences weary of explosions, CGI effects and sequels, sequels, sequels." The Baltimore Sun review offered Michael Sragow's opinion that "in its entirety, Hairspray has the funny tilt that only a director-choreographer like Shankman can give to a movie", pointing out that Shankman skillfully "puts a new-millennial zing behind exact re-creations of delirious period dances like the Mashed Potato". Dana Stevens from Slate called Hairspray "intermittently tasty, if a little too frantically eager to please". Stevens noted that "Despite its wholesomeness, this version stays remarkably true to the spirit of the original, with one size-60 exception: John Travolta as Edna Turnblad", saying "How you feel about Hairspray will depend entirely on your reaction to this performance".

The New Yorker's David Denby felt the new version of Hairspray was "perfectly pleasant", but compared unfavorably to the Broadway musical, since director Adam Shankman and screenwriter Leslie Dixon "have removed the traces of camp humor and Broadway blue that gave the stage show its happily knowing flavor". Denby criticized the dance numbers, calling them "unimaginatively shot", and he considered "the idea of substituting John Travolta for Harvey Fierstein as Tracy's hefty mother ... a blandly earnest betrayal". Stephanie Zacharek of Salon found Hairspray "reasonably entertaining. But do we really need to be entertained reasonably? Waters' original was a crazy sprawl that made perfect sense; this Hairspray toils needlessly to make sense of that craziness, and something gets lost in the translation." Zacharek was also displeased with the way Latifah's performance of "I Know Where I've Been" was incorporated into the movie, saying "The filmmakers may believe they're adding an extra layer of seriousness to the material ... [but] the inclusion of this big production number only suggests that the filmmakers fear the audience won't get the movie's message unless it's spelled out for them."

Despite critical and commercial success, Hairspray garnered some criticism upon its release from the LGBT community, particularly Travolta's portrayal of Edna Turnblad, a role played in the original film by drag performer Divine, and in the stage adaptation by Harvey Fierstein. Kevin Naff, a managing editor for a Washington, D.C./Baltimore area gay newspaper named the Washington Blade, called for a boycott of the film, alleging that Scientology, of which Travolta is an adherent, was homophobic, and it supported "cure" workshops for homosexuals. Adam Shankman rebuffed Naff's proposed boycott stating that Travolta was not a homophobe, as he (Shankman), Waters, Shaiman, Wittman, and several other crew and creative staff were homosexual, and Travolta got along well with the entire production. Shankman made it clear "John's personal beliefs did not walk onto my set. I never heard the word 'Scientology'."

== Accolades ==
Award	Category	Recipient(s)	Result
AARP Movies for Grownups Awards	Best Grownup Love Story	John Travolta and Christopher Walken	Won
Alliance of Women Film Journalists	Best Newcomer	Nikki Blonsky	Nominated
American Cinema Editors Awards	Best Edited Feature Film – Comedy or Musical	Michael Tronick	Nominated
Artios Awards	Outstanding Achievement in Casting for a Studio Feature – Comedy	David Rubin and Richard Hicks	Nominated
ASCAP Film and Television Music Awards	Top Box Office Films	Marc Shaiman and Scott Wittman	Won
Awards Circuit Community Awards	Best Cast Ensemble		Nominated
BET Awards	Best Actress	Queen Latifah	Nominated
British Academy Film Awards	Best Makeup and Hair	Judi Cooper-Sealy and Jordan Samuel	Nominated
Chicago Film Critics Association Awards	Most Promising Performer	Nikki Blonsky	Nominated
Critics' Choice Movie Awards	Best Comedy Movie		Nominated
Critics' Choice Movie Awards	Best Family Film		Nominated
Critics' Choice Movie Awards	Best Young Actress	Nikki Blonsky	Won
Critics' Choice Movie Awards	Best Acting Ensemble		Won
Critics' Choice Movie Awards	Best Song	"Come So Far (Got So Far to Go)"; Music and Lyrics by Marc Shaiman and Scott Witman	Nominated
Detroit Film Critics Society Awards	Best Newcomer	Nikki Blonsky	Nominated
Empire Awards	Best Soundtrack	Hairspray	Nominated
FilmInk Awards	Best Musical		Won
FilmInk Awards	Best Hair	John Travolta	Won
Gold Derby Awards	Best Supporting Actor	John Travolta	Nominated
Gold Derby Awards	Best Ensemble Cast	Nikki Blonsky, Amanda Bynes, Paul Dooley, Zac Efron, Allison Janney, Elijah Kelley, James Marsden, Michelle Pfeiffer, Queen Latifah, Brittany Snow, Jerry Stiller, John Travolta and Christopher Walken	Nominated
Gold Derby Awards	Best Art Direction	David Gropman and Gordon Sim	Nominated
Gold Derby Awards	Best Costume Design	Rita Ryack	Nominated
Gold Derby Awards	Best Makeup/Hair	Judi Cooper-Sealy and Jordan Samuel	Nominated
Gold Derby Awards	Best Original Song	"Come So Far (Got So Far to Go)"; Music and Lyrics by Marc Shaiman and Scott Witman	Nominated
Gold Derby Awards	Best Sound Editing/Mixing	Ron Bartlett, Susan Dawes, D.M. Hemphill, Rick Kline and Mildred Iatrou Morgan	Nominated
Golden Globe Awards	Best Motion Picture – Musical or Comedy		Nominated
Golden Globe Awards	Best Actress in a Motion Picture – Musical or Comedy	Nikki Blonsky	Nominated
Golden Globe Awards	Best Supporting Actor – Motion Picture	John Travolta	Nominated
Golden Reel Awards	Best Sound Editing – Music – Musical Feature Film	Sally Boldt, Lisa Jaime and Will Kaplan	Won
Grammy Awards	Best Compilation Soundtrack Album for a Motion Picture, Television or Other Visual Media	Hairspray	Nominated
Hollywood Film Awards	Ensemble of the Year		Won
Hollywood Post Alliance Awards	Outstanding Color Grading Feature Film in a DI Process	Steven J. Scott	Nominated
Houston Film Critics Society Awards	Best Performance by an Ensemble Cast		Won
International Film Music Critics Association Awards	Special Award	Marc Shaiman and Scott Witman	Won
International Online Cinema Awards	Best Costume Design	Rita Ryack	Nominated
International Online Cinema Awards	Best Ensemble Cast		Nominated
International Online Cinema Awards	Best Makeup and Hairstyling		Nominated
Locarno Film Festival	Audience Award	Adam Shankman	Nominated
MTV Movie Awards (2007)	Best Summer Movie You Haven't Seen Yet		Nominated
MTV Movie Awards (2008)	Best Breakthrough Performance	Nikki Blonsky	Nominated
MTV Movie Awards (2008)	Best Breakthrough Performance	Zac Efron	Won
NAACP Image Awards	Outstanding Supporting Actress in a Motion Picture	Queen Latifah	Nominated
Online Film & Television Association Awards	Best Breakthrough Performance: Female	Nikki Blonsky	Nominated
Online Film & Television Association Awards	Best Original Song	"Come So Far (Got So Far to Go)"; Music and Lyrics by Marc Shaiman and Scott Witman	Nominated
Online Film & Television Association Awards	Best Adapted Song	"Good Morning Baltimore"; Music by Marc Shaiman; Lyrics by Marc Shaiman and Scott Witman	Nominated
Online Film & Television Association Awards	Best Adapted Song	"I Can Hear the Bells"; Music by Marc Shaiman; Lyrics by Marc Shaiman and Scott Witman	Nominated
Online Film & Television Association Awards	Best Adapted Song	"You Can't Stop the Beat"; Music by Marc Shaiman; Lyrics by Marc Shaiman and Scott Witman	Nominated
Online Film & Television Association Awards	Best Costume Design		Nominated
Online Film & Television Association Awards	Best Makeup and Hairstyling		Won
Online Film Critics Society Awards	Best Breakthrough Performance	Nikki Blonsky	Won
Palm Springs International Film Festival	Ensemble Cast Award		Won
Palm Springs International Film Festival	Rising Star Award	Nikki Blonsky	Won
People's Choice Awards	Favorite Song from a Soundtrack	"You Can't Stop the Beat"	Won
Satellite Awards	Best Motion Picture – Musical or Comedy		Nominated
Satellite Awards	Art Direction and Production Design	Dennis Davenport and David Gropman	Nominated
Satellite Awards	Best Costume Design	Rita Ryack	Nominated
Satellite Awards	Best Original Song	"Come So Far (Got So Far to Go)"; Music and Lyrics by Marc Shaiman and Scott Witman	Nominated
Screen Actors Guild Awards	Outstanding Performance by a Cast in a Motion Picture	Nikki Blonsky, Amanda Bynes, Paul Dooley, Zac Efron, Allison Janney, Elijah Kelley, James Marsden, Michelle Pfeiffer, Queen Latifah, Brittany Snow, Jerry Stiller, John Travolta and Christopher Walken	Nominated
Teen Choice Awards	Choice Summer Movie: Comedy/Musical		Won
Women Film Critics Circle Awards	Best Female Images in a Movie		Won (Note: Tied with Life Support.)
Women Film Critics Circle Awards	Best Music	Nikki Blonsky and Queen Latifah	Won
Women Film Critics Circle Awards	Hall of Shame	John Travolta	Won
Young Artist Awards	Best Family Feature Film (Comedy or Drama)		Nominated
Young Hollywood Awards	One to Watch	Nikki Blonsky	Won
Young Hollywood Awards	One to Watch	Zac Efron	Won

== Cancelled sequel ==
Due to Hairspray's financial success, New Line Cinema had asked John Waters to write a sequel to the film. Waters reunited with director/choreographer Adam Shankman for the project, and songwriters Marc Shaiman and Scott Wittman were set to compose the film's musical numbers.

The story would have looked at Tracy's entering the late 1960s era of music and the British Invasion, and used the hippie movement and Vietnam War as backdrops. While no official casting was announced, New Line said that they hoped to "snag much of the original Hairspray cast". John Travolta, however, publicly announced that he would not return because he is "not a big sequel guy".

The sequel was set for a mid-July 2010 release by Warner Bros., which owns New Line Cinema. However, in June 2010, Shankman told British press that Hairspray 2: White Lipstick was no longer in development. Shankman has also said that there will be no sequel. In February 2019, John Waters announced he had written a sequel for HBO, but did not produce it.

== See also ==
- Cross-dressing in film and television
- Hairspray (musical)
- Hairspray (1988 film)
- Civil rights movement in popular culture
- Civil rights movement
