= Misha Gabriel =

American actor

Misha Gabriel Hamilton
- Born: May 13, 1987 (age 37); Fort Lauderdale, Florida, United States
- Occupation(s): Actor, dancer, choreographer

Misha Gabriel (born May 13, 1987), also known as Misha Gabriel Hamilton, is an American dancer, choreographer, and actor. He is known for dancing mainly in the shows of Janet Jackson and Michael Jackson, and for his role as Eddy in Step Up Revolution (2012) and Step Up: All In (2014).

== Life and career ==
Gabriel was born in Fort Lauderdale, Florida. His mother, Irina Brecher, is a ballet dancer from Romania. Gabriel, who was raised in Larkspur, Colorado, began dancing at the early age of two years. He appeared with Janet Jackson for three years in a number of her videos, TV shows, and live performances. He also took part in shows by Mariah Carey, Beyoncé, Christina Aguilera, Chris Brown, Ne-Yo, The Pussycat Dolls, Hilary Duff, John Legend, Kylie Minogue, and Omarion.

He has worked in several American commercials and in the movies Jackass Number Two, Clerks 2, and Center Stage: Turn It Up.

Gabriel was selected as a principal dancer for Michael Jackson's This Is It concerts and was set to perform in all 50 shows scheduled for the O2 Arena in London, England. The concerts were canceled 18 days before the dancers were set to travel to London due to Jackson's death. Gabriel was subsequently featured along with the 10 other dancers in the concerts' behind the scenes film, Michael Jackson's This Is It.

He then appeared in a major role, as Eddie, Sean (Ryan Guzman's) best friend, in the film Step Up Revolution (2012), directed by Scott Speer and Step Up: All In (2014), directed by Trish Sie.

He choreographed in:

- Justin Timberlake's live show FutureSex/LoveShow as a choreographer (2007)
- Music video for BoA's single "Eat You Up" in 2008
- In 2009, he was part of a planned This Is It series of 50 concerts by Michael Jackson to be held at the O2 Arena in London that was canceled because of Jackson's sudden death three weeks before the show's inaugural event. He was part of the backup dancers on Michael Jackson's This Is It
- The Pussycat Dolls' Doll Domination Tour
- The Cheetah Girls One World Tour
- Sara Lee/High School Musical 3 commercial
- Raven-Symoné's "Supernatural" and Dancing With the Stars
- Justin Bieber's Never Say Never Tour
- SHINee's amigo

=== Personal life ===
Misha is good friends with actor Kenny Wormald. They grew up dancing together and have worked together as dancers and actors. Misha is also good friends with choreographer Travis Wall.

== Filmography ==
=== Film ===
- 2006: Clerks II
- 2008: Center Stage: Turn It Up – as a Detroit dancer
- 2009: Michael Jackson's This Is It – as himself
- 2012: Step Up Revolution – as Eddy
- 2012: Boogie Town – as Matthew (post-production)
- 2014: Step Up: All In – as Eddy

=== Television ===
- 2015: It's Showtime – as himself (guest performer) on May 29, 2015 episode
