= Step Up (film) =

2006 film by Anne Fletcher

- Theatrical release poster
- Directed by: Anne Fletcher
- Screenplay by: Duane Adler; Melissa Rosenberg
- Story by: Duane Adler
- Produced by: Patrick Wachsberger; Erik Feig; Adam Shankman; Jennifer Gibgot
- Starring: Channing Tatum; Jenna Dewan; Mario; Drew Sidora; Rachel Griffiths
- Cinematography: Michael Seresin
- Edited by: Nancy Richardson
- Music by: Aaron Zigman
- Production companies: Touchstone Pictures; Summit Entertainment; Offspring Entertainment
- Distributed by: Buena Vista Pictures Distribution
- Release date: August 11, 2006
- Running time: 103 minutes
- Country: United States
- Language: English
- Budget: $12 million
- Box office: $114 million

Step Up is a 2006 American teen dance drama film directed by Anne Fletcher and written by Duane Adler and Melissa Rosenberg. The film stars Channing Tatum, Jenna Dewan, Mario Barrett, Drew Sidora, and Rachel Griffiths.

Set in Baltimore, Maryland, the film follows the tale of the disadvantaged Tyler Gage and the privileged modern dancer Nora Clark, who find themselves paired up in a showcase that determines both of their futures. Realizing that they only have one chance, they finally work together.

Step Up was released in the United States on August 11, 2006, by Buena Vista Pictures Distribution. The film received generally negative reviews from critics, but became a box office success, grossing $114 million against a budget of $12 million. It spawned a franchise that includes four sequels and a television series.

== Plot ==
Brothers Mac and Skinny Carter and their best friend Tyler Gage attend a party where they have a fight with their nemesis, PJ. He is involved in car thefts around the city, and Tyler, Mac, and Skinny have also gotten involved in the crimes. Following the party, the trio break into the Maryland School of the Arts and trash the theatre. When a security guard appears, Tyler accepts full responsibility for the vandalism himself, helping the two escape.

Tyler is sentenced to 200 hours of community service at the school. He works as a custodian, doing everything from mopping to changing light bulbs. While putting in his hours, he watches Nora Clark's dance class preparing her "senior showcase", an audition performance which will determine if she receives a position with an attending professional dance company.

When Mac and Skinny visit Tyler on the school's lot, Nora watches from a window as Tyler dances with his friends, mocking a mashup of breakdance and the moves he recently observed. When her dance partner Andrew sprains an ankle, she finds herself short a partner for her routine.

Auditioning sophomores to replace him, none meet her expectations. Tyler offers to help, but Nora initially refuses. After proving he can handle the routine, she reconsiders, convincing Director Gordon to let him rehearse with her. Initially they clash, but as rehearsals continue they grow closer and learn from each other. Tyler also befriends Miles, a music student with a crush on Nora's friend Lucy.

Nora's bond with Tyler grows, and one day she takes him to a special spot on the waterfront where she first envisioned her routine. She had always imagined it as an ensemble dance, rather than a duet. Tyler is inspired to help her dream come true, recruiting younger dancers from the school to perform in her number.

Brett signs a recording deal with a company, betraying Miles for the opportunity. Disgusted, Nora breaks up with him. Meanwhile, Tyler continues to try to balance his new goals and new friends, while nurturing a troubled relationship with his old ones.

Tyler asks Director Gordon if she will admit him into the school, and is told he must prove he deserves a chance. Nora suggests using the showcase as his entrance audition. After dancing together at a club where Miles and Lucy perform, Tyler and Nora finally kiss. Rehearsals continue until Andrew returns, seemingly healed from his injury. Feeling unwanted, Tyler accuses Nora of using him like Brett treated Miles, and returns to his janitorial work.

However, as the choreography is now much too difficult for Andrew, he falls, pulling himself from the routine. Again without a partner and crushed, Nora considers abandoning her dance career for college after all. Her mother's encouragement inspires her to rewrite the choreography without a partner.

Later during a party night at Omar's, Skinny comes although his mother had insisted he stay at home and is kicked out by Mac and Tyler. Frustrated, Skinny walks back home in a huff before spotting PJ arriving at a store with his friend. Skinny steals PJ's unattended vehicle and foolishly drives back to Omar's, wanting to hang out with the girls. As Mac and Tyler are trying to get him to abandon the car, PJ and his friends arrive and fatally shoot Skinny. A few days after Skinny's funeral, Mac and Tyler both decide to start making better life decisions.

Tyler shows up at the last minute on the evening of the showcase. He tries to persuade Nora to let him perform and forgive him. Initially declining, she suddenly changes her mind as Tyler wishes her luck and walks away. When the curtain opens, the whole ensemble performs the original choreography with Miles' latest musical score. The crowd is blown away.

Backstage, a proud Director Gordon introduces Nora to a director of a professional dance company, who hopes to sign her. Meanwhile, Mac congratulates Tyler for his performance. Thereafter, Director Gordon introduces Tyler as a "transfer." Nora is elated and embraces him. Repeating her original advice that he'll need to get some tights, the movie ends with them sharing a kiss.

== Cast ==
- Channing Tatum as Tyler Gage, a lower class hip hop dancer and Camille's foster brother who vandalizes MSA and is sentenced to community service by washing the school's windows. Tyler eventually falls in love with Nora.
- Jenna Dewan as Nora Clark, a ballet dancer who wants to be a professional dancer. Nora's father died prior to the events of the movie.
- Mario Barrett as Miles Darby, Nora's other best friend who is a talented DJ. Miles was previously lower class just like Tyler. Miles now lives with his aunt.
- Drew Sidora as Lucille "Lucy" Avila, Nora's best friend who loves to sing and is in a relationship with a college student named Colin. Lucy encourages Nora to follow her dream of being a professional dancer.
- Damaine Radcliff as Marcus "Mac" Carter, Tyler's best friend and Skinny's older brother
- De'Shawn Washington as Skinny Carter, Mac's younger brother who dies from his injuries and blood loss after being shot
- Alyson Stoner as Camille, Tyler's foster sister and also a talented hip hop dancer
- Rachel Griffiths as Director Gordon, the no nonsense director of Maryland School of Arts
- Josh Henderson as Brett Dolan, Nora's ex-boyfriend who wants to be a singer
- Heavy D as Omar, a shady car dealer
- Deirdre Lovejoy as Katherine Clark, Nora's widowed mother who does not approve of dance. Katherine does not think that dance is a practical career for Nora. Katherine wants Nora to abandon dance and go to college to pursue a practical career. Katherine fears that Nora will be hurt by pursuing a career in dance.
- Jamie Scott as Colin, Lucy's college aged boyfriend

Actors Channing Tatum and Jenna Dewan met while filming Step Up and began dating shortly after it was completed; they married in 2009. In 2013, they had their first daughter, Everly Elizabeth Maiselle Tatum. In 2018, they announced they were separating. They have since divorced.

== Reception ==
=== Box office ===
Step Up earned a total of $21 million in its opening weekend, ranking second in the North American box office. It earned $65.3 million in the United States and Canada by its last day in theaters on October 19, 2006. The film's budget was $12 million.

=== Critical response ===
On Rotten Tomatoes, the film has an approval rating of 21% based on reviews from 108 critics, with an average rating of 4.6/10. The website's consensus read: "This trite teen romance has too little plot and not enough dancing." On Metacritic the film has a weighted average score of 48/100 based on reviews from 23 critics, indicating "mixed or average reviews". Audiences polled by CinemaScore gave the film a grade of A−.

=== Home media ===
The film was released on DVD on December 19, 2006.

== Soundtrack ==
The soundtrack features music from Mario, Drew Sidora, Ciara, Chamillionaire, Kelis, Chris Brown, Within Temptation's Sharon Den Adel, Blaire Reinhard, Yung Joc and 3LW. J-pop singer Koda Kumi's 35th single But/Aishō was used as a theme song for the Japanese edition of the movie.

The lead singles from the soundtrack are Sean Paul & Keyshia Cole's "(When You Gonna) Give It Up to Me", Chris Brown's "Say Goodbye", and Ciara single, "Get Up" featuring Chamillionaire. It was released August 8. Other tracks include Kelis' "80s Joint", Anthony Hamilton's "Dear Life", YoungBloodZ's "Imma Shine" and Petey Pablo's "Show Me The Money". The title track was performed by future X Factor Australia winner Samantha Jade and produced by Wyclef Jean.
