= List of 2001 box office number-one films in the United States =

This is a list of films which have placed number one at the weekend box office in the United States during 2001.

== Number-one films ==
| † | This implies the highest-grossing movie of the year. |

| # | Weekend end date | Film | Gross | Notes | Ref |
|---|---|---|---|---|---|
| 1 | January 7, 2001 | Cast Away | $22,220,725 | | |
| 2 | January 14, 2001 | Save the Last Dance | $23,444,930 | Save the Last Dance broke Varsity Blues's record ($15.2 mil) for the highest Martin Luther King weekend debut. | |
| 3 | January 21, 2001 | Save the Last Dance | $15,366,047 | | |
| 4 | January 28, 2001 | The Wedding Planner | $13,510,293 | | |
| 5 | February 4, 2001 | The Wedding Planner | $10,605,542 | | |
| 6 | February 11, 2001 | Hannibal | $58,003,121 | Hannibal broke Scream 3's record ($34.7 mil) for the highest weekend debut in February, and Scary Movie's record ($42.3 mil) for the highest weekend debut for an R-rated film. | |
| 7 | February 18, 2001 | Hannibal | $29,707,947 | Hannibal broke Titanic's record ($28.2 mil) for the highest President's Day weekend ever. | |
| 8 | February 25, 2001 | Hannibal | $15,767,006 | | |
| 9 | March 4, 2001 | The Mexican | $20,108,829 | | |
| 10 | March 11, 2001 | The Mexican | $12,244,750 | | |
| 11 | March 18, 2001 | Exit Wounds | $18,485,586 | | |
| 12 | March 25, 2001 | Heartbreakers | $11,801,323 | | |
| 13 | April 1, 2001 | Spy Kids | $26,546,881 | | |
| 14 | April 8, 2001 | Spy Kids | $17,079,114 | | |
| 15 | April 15, 2001 | Spy Kids | $12,501,512 | | |
| 16 | April 22, 2001 | Bridget Jones's Diary | $10,184,136 | Bridget Jones's Diary reached #1 in its second weekend of release. | |
| 17 | April 29, 2001 | Driven | $12,174,504 | | |
| 18 | May 6, 2001 | The Mummy Returns | $68,139,035 | | |
| 19 | May 13, 2001 | The Mummy Returns | $33,741,755 | | |
| 20 | May 20, 2001 | Shrek | $42,347,760 | Shrek broke Chicken Run's record ($17.5 million) for the highest weekend debut for a DreamWorks Animation film. | |
| 21 | May 27, 2001 | Pearl Harbor | $59,078,912 | | |
| 22 | June 3, 2001 | Pearl Harbor | $29,558,276 | | |
| 23 | June 10, 2001 | Swordfish | $18,145,632 | | |
| 24 | June 17, 2001 | Lara Croft: Tomb Raider | $47,735,743 | Lara Croft: Tomb Raider broke Pokémon: The First Movie's record ($31 million) for the highest weekend debut of a video game adaptation and Scary Movie's record ($42.3 million) for highest weekend debut for a film featuring a female protagonist. | |
| 25 | June 24, 2001 | The Fast and the Furious | $40,089,015 | | |
| 26 | July 1, 2001 | A.I. Artificial Intelligence | $29,352,630 | | |
| 27 | July 8, 2001 | Cats & Dogs | $21,707,617 | | |
| 28 | July 15, 2001 | Legally Blonde | $20,377,426 | | |
| 29 | July 22, 2001 | Jurassic Park III | $50,771,645 | | |
| 30 | July 29, 2001 | Planet of the Apes | $68,532,960 | Planet of the Apes broke X-Men's record ($54.5 mil) for the highest weekend debut in July. | |
| 31 | August 5, 2001 | Rush Hour 2 | $67,408,222 | Rush Hour 2 broke The Sixth Sense's record ($26.7 mil) for the highest weekend debut in August. | |
| 32 | August 12, 2001 | American Pie 2 | $45,117,985 | American Pie 2 had a record opening for an R-rated comedy. It was the first time that four films had opened with more than $45 million in four consecutive weekends. | |
| 33 | August 19, 2001 | American Pie 2 | $21,104,650 | | |
| 34 | August 26, 2001 | American Pie 2 | $12,517,475 | | |
| 35 | September 2, 2001 | Jeepers Creepers | $13,106,108 | Jeepers Creepers broke The Crow: City of Angels' record ($9.7 mil) for the highest Labor Day weekend debut. | |
| 36 | September 9, 2001 | The Musketeer | $10,312,740 | | |
| 37 | September 16, 2001 | Hardball | $9,386,342 | | |
| 38 | September 23, 2001 | Hardball | $8,058,338 | | |
| 39 | September 30, 2001 | Don't Say a Word | $17,090,474 | | |
| 40 | October 7, 2001 | Training Day | $22,550,788 | | |
| 41 | October 14, 2001 | Training Day | $13,386,457 | | |
| 42 | October 21, 2001 | From Hell | $11,014,818 | | |
| 43 | October 28, 2001 | K-PAX | $17,215,275 | | |
| 44 | November 4, 2001 | Monsters, Inc. | $62,577,067 | Monsters, Inc. broke Toy Story 2's records ($57.4 mil) for the highest weekend debut in November, for an animated film, a G-rated film, and for the holiday season. It also broke How the Grinch Stole Christmas' record ($55 mil) for the highest weekend debut for a non-sequel, The Lion King's record ($40.8 mil) for the highest weekend debut for a non-sequel animated film, and Independence Day's record ($50.2 mil) for the highest weekend debut for an original film overall. | |
| 45 | November 11, 2001 | Monsters, Inc. | $45,551,028 | | |
| 46 | November 18, 2001 | Harry Potter and the Sorcerer's Stone † | $90,294,621 | Harry Potter and the Sorcerer's Stone's $32.3 million opening day gross broke Star Wars: Episode I – The Phantom Menace's record ($28.5 mil) for the highest single-day tally of all time. It also broke Monsters, Inc's records ($62.5 mil) for the highest weekend debut in November, for a non-sequel, and for the holiday season (which had been set 2 weeks earlier), The Lost World: Jurassic Park's record ($72.1 mil) for the highest weekend debut of all time, Star Wars: Episode I – The Phantom Menace's record ($64.8 mil) for the highest weekend debut for a PG-rated film, and Batman Forever's record ($52.7 mil) for the highest opening for a Warner Bros. film. Harry Potter and the Sorcerer's Stone had the highest weekend debut of 2001. | |
| 47 | November 25, 2001 | Harry Potter and the Sorcerer's Stone † | $57,487,755 | Harry Potter and the Sorcerer's Stone broke How the Grinch Stole Christmas' record ($52.1 mil) for the highest second weekend gross, and Toy Story 2's record ($57.39 mil) for the highest Thanksgiving weekend ever. | |
| 48 | December 2, 2001 | Harry Potter and the Sorcerer's Stone † | $23,642,327 | | |
| 49 | December 9, 2001 | Ocean's Eleven | $38,107,822 | Ocean's Eleven broke What Women Want's record ($33.6 million) for the highest weekend debut in December, and Titanic's second weekend grosses' record ($35.4 mil) for the highest weekend ever in December. | |
| 50 | December 16, 2001 | Vanilla Sky | $25,015,518 | | |
| 51 | December 23, 2001 | The Lord of the Rings: The Fellowship of the Ring | $47,211,490 | The Lord of the Rings: The Fellowship of the Ring broke Ocean's Eleven's record ($38.1 mil) for the highest weekend debut in December (which had been set 2 weeks earlier). | |
| 52 | December 30, 2001 | The Lord of the Rings: The Fellowship of the Ring | $38,695,582 | | |

== Highest-grossing films ==
=== Calendar Gross ===
Highest-grossing films of 2001 by Calendar Gross

| Rank | Title | Studio(s) | Actor(s) | Director(s) | Gross |
|---|---|---|---|---|---|
| 1. | Harry Potter and the Sorcerer's Stone | Warner Bros. Pictures | Daniel Radcliffe, Rupert Grint, Emma Watson, John Cleese, Robbie Coltrane, Warwick Davis, Richard Griffiths, Richard Harris, Ian Hart, John Hurt, Alan Rickman, Fiona Shaw, Maggie Smith and Julie Walters | Chris Columbus | $288,516,414 |
| 2. | Shrek | DreamWorks Animation | voices of Mike Myers, Eddie Murphy, Cameron Diaz and John Lithgow | Andrew Adamson and Vicky Jenson | $267,665,011 |
| 3. | Monsters, Inc. | Walt Disney Pictures | voices of John Goodman, Billy Crystal, Steve Buscemi, James Coburn, Jennifer Tilly and Mary Gibbs | Pete Docter | $237,466,244 |
| 4. | Rush Hour 2 | New Line Cinema | Jackie Chan, Chris Tucker, John Lone, Alan King, Roselyn Sánchez, Harris Yulin and Zhang Ziyi | Brett Ratner | $226,164,286 |
| 5. | The Mummy Returns | Universal Pictures | Brendan Fraser, Rachel Weisz, John Hannah, Arnold Vosloo, Oded Fehr, Patricia Velásquez, Freddie Boath, Alun Armstrong and The Rock | Stephen Sommers | $202,019,785 |
| 6. | Pearl Harbor | Walt Disney Studios | Ben Affleck, Josh Hartnett, Kate Beckinsale, Cuba Gooding Jr., Tom Sizemore, Jon Voight, Colm Feore and Alec Baldwin | Michael Bay | $198,542,554 |
| 7. | Jurassic Park III | Universal Pictures | Sam Neill, William H. Macy, Téa Leoni, Alessandro Nivola, Trevor Morgan and Michael Jeter | Joe Johnston | $181,171,875 |
| 8. | Planet of the Apes | 20th Century Fox | Mark Wahlberg, Tim Roth, Helena Bonham Carter, Michael Clarke Duncan, Kris Kristofferson, Estella Warren and Paul Giamatti | Tim Burton | $179,737,919 |
| 9. | Hannibal | Metro-Goldwyn-Mayer | Anthony Hopkins, Julianne Moore, Ray Liotta, Frankie R. Faison, Giancarlo Giannini, Francesca Neri and Gary Oldman | Ridley Scott | $165,092,268 |
| 10. | The Lord of the Rings: The Fellowship of the Ring | New Line Cinema | Elijah Wood, Ian McKellen, Liv Tyler, Viggo Mortensen, Sean Astin, Cate Blanchett, John Rhys-Davies, Billy Boyd, Dominic Monaghan, Orlando Bloom, Christopher Lee, Hugo Weaving, Sean Bean, Ian Holm and Andy Serkis | Peter Jackson | $163,871,215 |

=== In-Year Release ===
Highest-grossing films of 2001 by In-year release
| Rank | Title | Distributor | Domestic gross |
|---|---|---|---|
| 1. | Harry Potter and the Sorcerer's Stone | Warner Bros. | $317,575,550 |
| 2. | The Lord of the Rings: The Fellowship of the Ring | New Line Cinema | $313,364,114 |
| 3. | Shrek | DreamWorks | $267,665,011 |
| 4. | Monsters, Inc. | Disney | $255,873,250 |
| 5. | Rush Hour 2 | New Line Cinema | $226,164,286 |
| 6. | The Mummy Returns | Universal | $202,019,785 |
| 7. | Pearl Harbor | Disney | $198,542,554 |
| 8. | Ocean's Eleven | Warner Bros. | $183,417,150 |
| 9. | Jurassic Park III | Universal | $181,171,875 |
| 10. | Planet of the Apes | 20th Century Fox | $180,011,740 |

Highest-grossing films by MPAA rating of 2001
| G | Monsters, Inc. |
| PG | Harry Potter and the Sorcerer's Stone |
| PG-13 | The Lord of the Rings: The Fellowship of the Ring |
| R | Hannibal |

== See also ==
- List of American films — American films by year
- Lists of box office number-one films

== Chronology ==
| Preceded by 2000 | 2001 | Succeeded by 2002 |
