= Heartbeats (2017 film) =

2018 comedy-drama film

- Film poster
- Directed by: Duane Adler
- Written by: Duane Adler
- Produced by: Andrea Chung; Sriram Das; Karine Martin
- Starring: Krystal Ellsworth; Amitash Pradhan; Daphne Zuniga; Paul McGillion; Salman Yusuff Khan; Justin Chon
- Cinematography: Ravi Varman
- Music by: Gingger Shankar
- Production company: Bowery Hills Entertainment
- Distributed by: Amazon Prime Video (USA) Wild Bunch (France) Capelight Pictures (Germany) (Switzerland) Fox Movies (Southeast Asian TV channel) (SE Asia) Sky Cinema (United Kingdom) Ster-Kinekor (South Africa) Koch Media (Italy)
- Release date: February 2017 (UAE)
- Running time: 107 minutes
- Countries: United States; United Arab Emirates; India
- Language: English

Heartbeats is a 2017 romance-dance-dramedy written and directed by Step Up creator Duane Adler. The movie stars newcomers Krystal Ellsworth and Amitash Pradhan.

== Cast ==
- Krystal Ellsworth as Kelli
- Amitash Pradhan as Aseem
- Paul McGillion
- Salman Yusuff Khan as Pallav
- Daphne Zuniga
- Justin Chon
- Aneesha Joshi as Deepika
- Kishori Shahane
- Mohan Kapoor

== Production ==
=== Development ===
Duane Adler, music supervisor Joel C. High and producers Andrea Chung and Sriram Das teamed up with Roc Nation to create original music for the movie and the film's choreography. Sony Music later acquired the soundtrack.

Chung studied abroad in India at NYU and was a fan of Adler's Save the Last Dance, in 2013 she approached Adler about developing a cross-over dance movie with Indian and American Contemporary musical and dance mash-up highlighting the celebration of the two cultures and discovered Adler too wanted to make a cross-cultural film.

I've wanted to do a cross-cultural love story that takes an American character abroad for some time. The world has changed and shrunk and I wanted to try to capture that, to show how we are more alike than different. India has an inherent love of music and dance, of life and celebration.

— Duane Adler to NBC News

=== Filming ===
Principal photography began in India in January 2016.

It's so cool to see that we live on different sides of the globe, but I mean, we speak a same language, which is art and performance art, and that way there's a common ground. So we can talk about acting and projects we're working on. It's just like being at home.

— Actor Justin Chon while filming on location in India

== Release ==
The film had a limited release in USA in January 2018 before being acquired by Amazon Prime for a Valentine's Day 2021 release.

The movie opened in the Top 15 box office in Germany, South Africa, Russia, Austria and Middle East.

The movie was at #2 most streamed for two weeks straight in the Romance category on Sky Cinema UK.

Wild Bunch released it in France on Netflix where the film developed a young fan base.

The movie released theatrically in Taiwan in September 2017 and Fox Movies Asia released in 2018 in rest of Southeast Asia.

German company Koch Media acquired the film for Italy and later released on Amazon Prime.

== Reception ==
The movie became available on Amazon Prime Video on Valentine's Day 2021 and has garnered 4.3/5 rating out of 479 user reviews in the first 2 months.
