= Make It Happen (film) =

- UK theatrical release poster
- Directed by: Darren Grant
- Screenplay by: Duane Adler; Nicole Avril
- Story by: Duane Adler
- Produced by: Anthony Mosawi; Brad Luff
- Starring: Mary Elizabeth Winstead; Riley Smith; Julissa Bermudez; Tessa Thompson; Karen LeBlanc; Ashley Roberts; John Reardon
- Cinematography: David Claessen
- Edited by: Scott Richter
- Music by: Paul Haslinger
- Production company: The Mayhem Project
- Distributed by: The Weinstein Company; The Mayhem Project
- Release dates: August 8, 2008 (United Kingdom); December 9, 2008 (United States)
- Running time: 90 minutes
- Country: United States
- Language: English
- Box office: $10.1 million

Make It Happen is a 2008 American dance film directed by Darren Grant and starring Mary Elizabeth Winstead. The screenplay was co-written by Duane Adler, who was a screenwriter for other dance films Step Up and Save the Last Dance.

Though the film was theatrically released internationally, the film was released direct-to-video in the United States on December 9, 2008. The film received generally negative reviews, with chief criticisms being that it was yet another by-the-numbers dance film, though Winstead's performance received significant praise. The film was also a commercial failure, only grossing $10 million.

== Plot ==
Lauryn Kirk is an aspiring dancer. As there are no dance schools in her hometown of Glenwood, Indiana, Lauryn says goodbye to her brother Joel and departs for Chicago to audition for a famous dance school. Joel works as a mechanic in the family garage, and is wary of Lauryn's decision to leave but eventually gives her his blessing. When Lauryn dances at the audition, her mostly a hip hop dance routine, is rejected by the judge, who says that they need to see something more "sensual and feminine".

Dejected, Lauryn goes to a diner to down her sorrows, but soon finds her car towed off. Upon seeing her misfortunes, Dana, a friendly waitress from the diner invites Lauryn to her apartment and out of the pouring rain. Dana subsequently offers Lauryn a place to stay, considering Lauryn could not go back home and face her brother. The next day, Dana brings Lauryn to a club called Ruby's (whose dances are rooted in burlesque), where she meets with Russ, the slick-talking disc jockey, and Brenda, the club owner. Brenda hires Lauryn as a bookkeeper, in light of her skills with numbers. Lauryn watches as a dancer, Carmen, performs impressively on the stage.

Before locking up late one night, Lauryn goes on the stage and silently and elegantly dances, while unbeknownest to her, Russ watches from a distance. The next night, Brenda finds herself short of dancers. Russ asks Lauryn to dance, after having seen her graceful performance the previous night. Lauryn reluctantly agrees, and goes on stage. At first, new to the sexy routine, Lauryn looks foolish, but when Russ starts playing hip-hop music, Lauryn does a sexy hip-hop routine, and finds herself to be Ruby's new star. As Lauryn and Russ' relationship progresses, Lauryn continues performing stunningly on stage, much to Carmen and Brooke's chagrin, who try to sabotage and intimidate the newcomer.

One night, Joel catches Lauryn at the club during a dance; After an argument, in which Lauryn realizes that Joel is losing the family garage due to stacking mortgages and bills, she decides to ditch the stage and return to Indiana to save the garage. Soon after though, Joel catches a peek of Lauryn joyfully dancing in the garage one day, and asks Lauryn to give the audition another shot. Lauryn returns to Chicago for a second audition. She nails it, and happily embraces Russ, who has come to encourage her. Lauryn goes back to Ruby's to apologize to Brenda, but finds a surprise congratulatory party awaiting for her, and the party breaks into dance.

== Cast ==
- Mary Elizabeth Winstead as Lauryn Kirk
- Riley Smith as Russ
- Julissa Bermudez as Carmen
- Tessa Thompson as Dana
- Karen LeBlanc as Brenda
- Ashley Roberts as Brooke
- John Reardon as Joel Kirk
- Matt Kippen as Wayne

== Production ==
=== Early conception ===
"What attracted me to "Make It Happen" was the fact that I could really just incorporate a lot of styles that I had done over the years. You have the dance element, and each little dance routine was going to be like its own little music video," Grant explains. When it came to helping the director to tell the story, Grant went to work with longtime collaborator, 1999 Kodak Cinematography Award winner David Claessen. "I've worked with David since I was a PA and an electrician, and I always liked the way he lights. We've done music videos that have been amazing and every frame is like a portrait or a picture."

On July 10, 2007, the casting of Mary Elizabeth Winstead in the lead role was announced. Winstead was excited by the challenge of taking on a lead role and getting to dance onscreen. Winstead, who started dancing at the age of four, was thrilled and a little shocked to be offered the role of Lauryn. "I actually got offered the role kind of out of the blue. And I was extremely excited because it's a dance film and dance has been a passion of mine for a long time, especially growing up, so it was just a really great opportunity." Soon after, Winstead began practicing the dance moves with choreographer Tracy Phillips. In June, Riley Smith announces his association with the film in his official website. On August 16, Ashley Roberts was announced as joining the film by Entertainment Sunflashes.

The film was shot on location in Winnipeg, Manitoba, Canada, from August 8 until September 17, 2007. They also shot briefly in Chicago for two days.

=== Marketing ===
In mid July, promotions for the film began in UK. On July 11, the theatrical international trailer was released through Optimum Releasing, followed by promotional and production stills. Soon after, promotional clips began sneaking their way into the Internet, and TV spots started airing in UK TV channels. The theatrical trailer was released thereafter. The first UK review surfaced on August 3. Make It Happen was released in the UK on August 8, 2008.

The film was further released in Iceland on the 28th of August, and then in Singapore and Australia on September 4. The film debuted in the Philippines on 1 October, and recently premiered in Hong Kong theaters on November 13. The film was also released in Netherlands on February 5, 2009 and Belgium on the 18th.

Make It Happen made its final theatrical run in France, on 10 June 2009, exactly a year after the film's shooting production began.

== Release ==
=== Home media ===
Make It Happen was released on standard DVD in the UK on December 29, 2008. Supplementary materials include: "She's Got Moves" DVD Game, an interview with Mary Elizabeth Winstead, 13 deleted and extended scenes, blooper reel, trailers and TV spots. The film never received a theatrical release in the United States and instead went straight to DVD on December 9, 2008, while finding release on DVD on November 4, 2008. The DVD possesses the removed plotline of Dana's sudden pregnancy, and of her eventual miscarriage and also an extended sequence of Brooke's audition.

Make It Happen has yet to be released on Blu-ray in the US. It was released in Blu-ray on 20 July 2009 in the UK. The only special features available are a few trailers for other Weinstein releases, and Dutch subtitles. The release is Region B Locked. The film eventually got a Canadian Blu-ray as well, released on January 25, 2011, by Alliance Films as a Region A Locked disc. It also similarly lacks special features.

== Reception ==
=== Box office ===
Make It Happen was released first in the UK on Friday, the 8th of August. During its initial release, the film grossed $945,349 over the weekend and ended up fifth on the box office chart. It spent a total of one week on the top 10 chart, before dropping down to the 12th position in its second week, earning $216,923 as the weekend gross. The film grossed $2,616,579 a total of over its run in the UK. It was further released on the 4th of September in both Australia and Singapore, where it went on to collect a total of $1,526,207 and $91,686 respectively. It made $108,174 in the Philippines after its debut on 1 October. The film was released direct to DVD in the US on December 9, 2008.

Make It Happen sat on #5 in the box office chart in Slovakia, earning $18,202, and ended up with $62,362 throughout its release in Slovakia. The film was later released in Netherlands on 5 February 2009. In its first week, the film stood at #8 in the chart, charting $113,045, and racked up $414,585 throughout its release. The film was released on March 3, 2009, in Hungary, where it collected a total of $19,830 for four weeks. Make It Happen stands at #6 during its weekend gross in Thailand, where it collected $42,693 in its first weekend. In Italy, where the film came out on 5 April, it made $1,588,417. Furthermore, the film was released on 16 March in Russia and on the 23rd in Malaysia. It made a feeble $41,443 during its 4 weeks run in Malaysia, but in a contrast, made $492,825 during its 6 weeks run in Russia.

Make It Happen was released in France on 10 June 2009, where the film collected a total of $1,209,457. The film made its final run in theaters in Lebanon, where it went on to collect $8,481. In total, Make It Happen made $10,153,961 in the international box office.

=== Critical response ===
The film received generally unfavorable reviews from critics. On Rotten Tomatoes, the film has an approval rating of 22% based on reviews from 18 critics. The site's consensus states: "Cheap, predictable, formulaic and unimaginative generic dance film. Comes across as Showgirls for simpleton teens, but with much less flesh on show".

Critics disliked the film's similarities with other dance flicks such as Save the Last Dance and Flashdance. The dance moves were also criticized as being lazy, and offering nothing groundbreaking. Peter Bradshaw of The Guardian gave it 1 out of 5 and described it as "Cheesy and icky, but calamitously fails to offer any high-octane dance to ease the pain."

Critics agreed that the film's biggest asset was Mary Elizabeth Winstead. Reviewer Mike Martin says, "Winstead infuses every moment with an amazing amount of charm". Matthew Turner of ViewLondon even goes to say it "compensates for the generally poor direction." The story has also been said to have "plenty of heart". "[...] the screenplay makes an effort to build a story and characters and interest, to put Lauryn's dancing ambition in context and the dance sequences in the third act more explosive," said critic Andrew L. Urban.

The film was listed as the 36th Worst 2008 Film at Times Online.

== Soundtrack ==
No official soundtrack has been planned for the film, but Make It Happen features the following songs, among others:

- Teach Me How To Dance – Che'Nelle
- Put It Down – Zshatwa
- Going Home – Mozella
- My Way – Bella (www.BellaOfficial.com)
- Hustle – Jamelia
- Get What I Want – Bitter:Sweet
- Hoodie – Lady Sovereign
- Get Your Shoes On – Elisabeth Withers
- Ruby Blue – Róisín Murphy
- Steamy – Tamara Powell
- Shawty Get Loose – Lil Mama ft. T-Pain & Chris Brown
- Triple Double – Ohmega Watts
- Break It Down – Alana D.
- Love Ya – Unklejam
- Bottoms Up – Keke Palmer
- Hello – Kip Blackshire
- Flash Back – Fat Freddy's Drop
- Beware of the Dog – Jamelia
- Push It – Salt-N-Pepa
- Just Dance – Lady Gaga
