= Make Your Move (film) =

- Theatrical release poster
- Directed by: Duane Adler
- Written by: Duane Adler
- Based on: Romeo and Juliet by William Shakespeare
- Produced by: Robert W. Cort; Lee Soo-man; Eric Hetzel; Patricia Chun
- Starring: BoA Kwon; Derek Hough; Will Yun Lee; Wesley Jonathan; Izabella Miko; Jefferson Brown
- Cinematography: Gregory Middleton
- Edited by: Melissa Kent
- Music by: Michael Corcoran
- Production companies: Robert Cort Productions; SM Entertainment
- Distributed by: High Top Releasing (North America); CJ Entertainment (South Korea)
- Release dates: October 17, 2013 (Hong Kong); April 17, 2014 (South Korea); April 18, 2014 (United States)
- Countries: United States; South Korea
- Languages: English; Korean; Japanese
- Box office: $1 million

Make Your Move (formerly called Cobu 3D, also known as Make Your Move 3D) is a 2014 independent romance drama film starring K-pop singer BoA and ballroom dancer Derek Hough. The film was directed by Duane Adler, who wrote the script for Save the Last Dance (2001) and Step Up (2006). Hough took season twelve off of the show Dancing with the Stars to star in the film, which was shot in New York City and Toronto during the spring of 2011. Aside from the lead stars, singer Yunho from TVXQ has a cameo appearance. The film was choreographed by Tabitha and Napoleon D'umo, Yako Miyamoto, and Nick Gonzalez.

A preview of the film was shown at KCON 2012, a Korean entertainment convention, in Irvine, California. Songs from the movie's soundtrack were played at the convention as well including three by the groups Girls' Generation, F(x) and TVXQ.

The film was released in 2014. According to IMDb, it was released in Norway, Italy, Belgium, the Netherlands, and Denmark in the summer. It was released in the United Arab Emirates, South Korea, and the United States in 2014.

== Plot ==
Donny is an unemployed who dances on the streets of New Orleans without permit, but is often caught and jailed, his parole officer comes and tells him to start finding a real job. He moves back to New York to meet up with his foster brother Nick who owns a nightclub called "Static" to which he sees it as an opportunity to continue his passion for dancing, Nick does not warm up when he meets his former partner Kaz whom he despises, claiming that he plagiarized his night club for his own, Meanwhile Donny meets Kaz's younger sister Aya, the leader of the girl group "The Cobu girls" who only has three weeks to find a job before she gets sent back to Japan, despite the rivalry between their siblings, Aya and Donny fall in love.

== Cast ==
- Derek Hough as Donny
- BoA as Aya
- Will Yun Lee as Kaz
- Wesley Jonathan as Nick
- Izabella Miko as Tatiana
- Jefferson Brown as Michael
- Miki Ishikawa as Natsumi
- Dan Lauria as Parole Officer Foster
- Rick Gonzalez as Rene
- Michael Mando as Raphael
- Yunho as Yunho (cameo)

== Reception ==
Make Your Move has received mixed reviews from critics. As of June 2020, the film holds a 38% approval rating on review aggregator Rotten Tomatoes, based on 16 reviews with an average rating of 4.76/10. Metacritic calculated a score of 40 out of 100 based on 9 reviews, which signifies mixed or average reviews.

Sara Stewart of the New York Post gave the film one out of four stars, saying "The dancing's fine here, but there's little else to distinguish Make Your Move, an entirely generic drama in which two characters actually say to one another, 'What if this doesn't work?' 'It has to.' It doesn't."

Inkoo Kang of the Los Angeles Times said "[Make Your Move]'s core dance styles are a wonderfully frenetic fusion of tap and hip-hop and a truly novel blend of Japanese taiko drumming and K-pop girl-group choreography. Whenever actor Derek Hough and BoA stop leaping and twirling, though, Make Your Move is an underwritten mess."

Frank Scheck of The Hollywood Reporter said "Undemanding young audiences will hardly mind the one-note characterizations, formulaic storyline and banal dialogue even as they'll relate to the frequent nods to text messaging and YouTube videos gone viral... Hough's dancing is far more impressive than his acting, and BoA, despite her perky sexiness, is an even less compelling screen presence. But they certainly move well together, and that's pretty much all that matters here..."

Stephanie Merry of The Washington Post said "Although the bit of bedroom footwork was more laugh-inducing than anything, some of the dancing really is spectacular. Scenes from the competing clubs include impressive choreography and gravity-defying moves. If only the poorly delivered, trite dialogue and predictable plot aimed as high."

== Soundtrack ==
| Song | Artist | Duration |
|---|---|---|
| Light Up This City | Candy Coated Killahz | 3:59 |
| Say Yes | Jessica, Krystal & Kris | 3:58 |
| Let Me In | Michael Corcoran | 2:37 |
| You Found Me | Shannon LaBrie | 4:27 |
| Cobu Love Theme / Static Invasion | The Outfit & Tasha "Dash" Schumann | 4:22 |
| Dance to the Drummers Beat | Herman Kelly | 3:31 |
| Runnin on Empty | TVXQ | 3:34 |
| The Road (Finer Things) | NOLA Fam & Nicky Da B | 3:17 |
| Fall For You | Stephen Gordon | 4:07 |
| Nu ABO | f(x) | 3:43 |
| Simple Simon | On Fire Music | 3:13 |
| Cheap Creeper | Girls' Generation | 3:01 |
| Catching Shadows | Felicia Barton | 3:54 |
| Now We Know | The Outfit | 4:38 |
| Breathing Love | Melodye Perry | 5:13 |
| Trap | Henry Lau (Super Junior-M) | 3:46 |
