= List of 2002 box office number-one films in the United States =

This is a list of films that have placed number one at the weekend box office in the United States during 2002.

== Number-one films ==
†	This implies the highest-grossing domestic movie of the year.

# no	Weekend end date	Film	Box office	Notes	Ref
1	January 6, 2002	The Lord of the Rings: The Fellowship of the Ring	$23,006,447		
2	January 13, 2002	The Lord of the Rings: The Fellowship of the Ring	$16,201,260	The Lord of the Rings: The Fellowship of the Ring became the first film since How the Grinch Stole Christmas to top the box office for four consecutive weekends.	
3	January 20, 2002	Black Hawk Down	$28,611,736	Black Hawk Down reached #1 after three weekends of limited release. It also broke Save the Last Dance's record ($23.4 mil) for the highest Martin Luther King weekend debut.	
4	January 27, 2002	Black Hawk Down	$17,012,268		
5	February 3, 2002	Black Hawk Down	$11,112,555	Black Hawk Down and The Lord of the Rings: The Fellowship of the Ring became the first two films to win at least three consecutive weekends in a row since The Birdcage and Primal Fear in 1996.	
6	February 10, 2002	Collateral Damage	$15,058,432		
7	February 17, 2002	John Q.	$20,275,194	John Q. broke The Wedding Singer's record ($18.9 mil) for the highest President's Day weekend debut.	
8	February 24, 2002	Queen of the Damned	$14,757,535		
9	March 3, 2002	We Were Soldiers	$20,212,543		
10	March 10, 2002	The Time Machine	$22,610,437		
11	March 17, 2002	Ice Age	$46,312,454	Ice Age broke Liar Liar's records ($31.4 mil) for the highest weekend debut in March and for a spring release.	
12	March 24, 2002	Blade II	$32,528,016		
13	March 31, 2002	Panic Room	$30,056,751	Panic Room broke The Matrix's record ($27.7 mill) for the highest Easter weekend debut.	
14	April 7, 2002	Panic Room	$18,244,157		
15	April 14, 2002	Changing Lanes	$17,128,062		
16	April 21, 2002	The Scorpion King	$36,075,875	The Scorpion King broke The Matrix's record ($27.8 mil) for the highest weekend debut in April.	
17	April 28, 2002	The Scorpion King	$18,038,270		
18	May 5, 2002	Spider-Man †	$114,844,116	Spider-Man's $39.4 million opening day gross broke Harry Potter and the Sorcerer's Stone's record ($32.3 mil) for the highest single-day tally of all-time, a record it would then break in its second day of release with $43.6 million. It also broke Harry Potter and the Sorcerer's Stone's records for the highest weekend debut for a non-sequel and of all-time, The Lost World: Jurassic Park's records ($72.1 mil) for the highest weekend debut in May, in the summer, and for a PG-13 rated film, and X-Men's record ($54.7 mil) for the highest weekend debut for a superhero film. Spider-Man was the first film ever to gross more than $100 million in 3 days, and had the highest weekend debut of 2002.	
19	May 12, 2002	Spider-Man †	$71,417,527	Spider-Man broke Harry Potter and the Sorcerer's Stone's record ($57.5 mil) for the highest second weekend gross.	
20	May 19, 2002	Star Wars: Episode II – Attack of the Clones	$80,027,814	Star Wars: Episode II – Attack of the Clones broke Star Wars: Episode I – The Phantom Menace's record ($64.8 mil) for the highest weekend debut for a prequel. In second place, Spider-Man broke Titanic's record ($33.3 mil) for the highest third weekend gross.	
21	May 26, 2002	Star Wars: Episode II – Attack of the Clones	$47,880,532		
22	June 2, 2002	The Sum of All Fears	$31,178,526		
23	June 9, 2002	The Sum of All Fears	$19,230,111		
24	June 16, 2002	Scooby-Doo	$54,155,312		
25	June 23, 2002	Minority Report	$35,677,125	In second place, Lilo & Stitch's $35.2 million opening weekend broke Unbreakable's record ($30.3 million) for the highest weekend debut for a film that did not open in first place. Initial estimates had Lilo & Stitch ahead of Minority Report.	
26	June 30, 2002	Mr. Deeds	$37,162,787		
27	July 7, 2002	Men in Black II	$52,148,751	Men in Black II broke Men in Black's record ($51.1 mil) for the highest Fourth of July weekend debut.	
28	July 14, 2002	Men in Black II	$24,410,311		
29	July 21, 2002	Road to Perdition	$15,412,515	Road to Perdition reached #1 in its second weekend of release. Initial estimates had Stuart Little 2 ahead of Road to Perdition.	
30	July 28, 2002	Austin Powers in Goldmember	$73,071,188	Austin Powers in Goldmember broke Planet of the Apes' record ($68.5 mil) for the highest weekend debut in July. It also broke Mission: Impossible 2's record ($57.8 mil) for the highest weekend debut for a spy film.	
31	August 4, 2002	Signs	$60,117,080		
32	August 11, 2002	XXX	$44,506,103		
33	August 18, 2002	XXX	$22,111,421		
34	August 25, 2002	Signs	$14,285,028	Signs reclaimed #1 in its fourth weekend of release.	
35	September 1, 2002	Signs	$13,441,194	Signs became the first film since The Sixth Sense to top the box office in its fifth weekend and the first film since Stuart Little to top the box office for three nonconsecutive weekends.	
36	September 8, 2002	Swimfan	$11,326,601		
37	September 15, 2002	Barbershop	$20,627,433		
38	September 22, 2002	Barbershop	$12,817,223		
39	September 29, 2002	Sweet Home Alabama	$35,648,740	Sweet Home Alabama broke Rush Hour's record ($33.0 mil) for the highest weekend debut in September.	
40	October 6, 2002	Red Dragon	$36,540,945	Red Dragon broke Meet the Parents's record ($28.6 mil) for the highest weekend debut in October and for any fall release.	
41	October 13, 2002	Red Dragon	$17,655,750		
42	October 20, 2002	The Ring	$15,015,393		
43	October 27, 2002	Jackass: The Movie	$22,763,437		
44	November 3, 2002	The Santa Clause 2	$29,008,696		
45	November 10, 2002	8 Mile	$51,240,555		
46	November 17, 2002	Harry Potter and the Chamber of Secrets	$88,357,488		
47	November 24, 2002	Die Another Day	$47,072,040		
48	December 1, 2002	Harry Potter and the Chamber of Secrets	$32,117,496	Harry Potter and the Chamber of Secrets reclaimed #1 in its third weekend on Thanksgiving Holiday.	
49	December 8, 2002	Die Another Day	$12,843,007	Die Another Day reclaimed #1 in its third weekend of release.	
50	December 15, 2002	Maid in Manhattan	$18,711,407		
51	December 22, 2002	The Lord of the Rings: The Two Towers	$62,007,528	The Lord of the Rings: The Two Towers broke The Lord of the Rings: The Fellowship of the Ring's record ($47.2 mil) for the highest weekend debut in December.	
52	December 29, 2002	The Lord of the Rings: The Two Towers	$48,875,549		

== Highest-grossing films ==
=== Calendar Gross ===
Highest-grossing films of 2002 by Calendar Gross

Rank	Title	Studio(s)	Actor(s)	Director(s)	Gross
1.	Spider-Man	Columbia Pictures	Tobey Maguire, Willem Dafoe, Kirsten Dunst, James Franco, Cliff Robertson, Rosemary Harris and J.K. Simmons	Sam Raimi	$403,706,375
2.	Star Wars: Episode II – Attack of the Clones	20th Century Fox	Ewan McGregor, Natalie Portman, Hayden Christensen, Ian McDiarmid, Samuel L. Jackson, Christopher Lee, Anthony Daniels, Kenny Baker and Frank Oz	George Lucas	$302,191,252
3.	Harry Potter and the Chamber of Secrets	Warner Bros. Pictures	Daniel Radcliffe, Rupert Grint, Emma Watson, Kenneth Branagh, John Cleese, Robbie Coltrane, Warwick Davis, Richard Griffiths, Richard Harris, Jason Isaacs, Alan Rickman, Fiona Shaw, Maggie Smith and Julie Walters	Chris Columbus	$243,867,371
4.	Signs	Walt Disney Studios	Mel Gibson, Joaquin Phoenix, Rory Culkin and Abigail Breslin	M. Night Shyamalan	$227,486,621
5.	My Big Fat Greek Wedding	IFC Films	Nia Vardalos, John Corbett, Lainie Kazan, Michael Constantine, Gia Carides, Louis Mandylor, Andrea Martin and Joey Fatone	Joel Zwick	$223,900,343
6.	The Lord of the Rings: The Two Towers	New Line Cinema	Elijah Wood, Ian McKellen, Liv Tyler, Viggo Mortensen, Sean Astin, Cate Blanchett, John Rhys-Davies, Bernard Hill, Christopher Lee, Billy Boyd, Dominic Monaghan, Orlando Bloom, Hugo Weaving, Miranda Otto, David Wenham, Brad Dourif, Sean Bean and Andy Serkis	Peter Jackson	$218,595,905
7.	Austin Powers in Goldmember	New Line Cinema	Mike Myers, Beyoncé Knowles, Seth Green, Michael York, Robert Wagner, Mindy Sterling, Verne Troyer and Michael Caine	Jay Roach	$212,864,437
8.	Men in Black II	Columbia Pictures	Tommy Lee Jones, Will Smith, Lara Flynn Boyle, Johnny Knoxville, Rosario Dawson, Tony Shalhoub and Rip Torn	Barry Sonnenfeld	$190,418,803
9.	Ice Age	20th Century Fox	voices of Ray Romano, John Leguizamo, Denis Leary, Goran Višnjić and Jack Black	Chris Wedge	$176,387,405
10.	A Beautiful Mind	Universal Pictures	Russell Crowe, Ed Harris, Jennifer Connelly, Paul Bettany, Adam Goldberg, Judd Hirsch, Josh Lucas, Anthony Rapp and Christopher Plummer	Ron Howard	$154,865,545

=== In-Year Release ===
Highest-grossing films of 2002 by In-year release
Rank	Title	Distributor	Domestic gross
1.	Spider-Man	Columbia	$403,706,375
2.	The Lord of the Rings: The Two Towers	New Line Cinema	$339,789,881
3.	Star Wars: Episode II – Attack of the Clones	20th Century Fox	$302,191,252
4.	Harry Potter and the Chamber of Secrets	Warner Bros.	$261,988,482
5.	My Big Fat Greek Wedding	IFC	$241,438,208
6.	Signs	Disney	$227,966,634
7.	Austin Powers in Goldmember	New Line Cinema	$213,307,889
8.	Men in Black II	Columbia	$190,418,803
9.	Ice Age	20th Century Fox	$176,387,405
10.	Chicago	Miramax	$170,687,518

Highest-grossing films by MPAA rating of 2002
G	The Rookie
PG	Star Wars: Episode II – Attack of the Clones
PG-13	Spider-Man
R	8 Mile

== See also ==
- List of American films — American films by year
- Lists of box office number-one films

== Chronology ==
Preceded by 2001	2002	Succeeded by 2003
