= Robinson Savary =

- Born: Robinson Savary; May 17, 1969 (age 57); Paris, France
- Occupations: Film director, photographer, screenwriter
- Years active: 1988–present

Robinson Savary (born May 17, 1969) is a French film director, screenwriter, and photographer. He is best known for his acclaimed debut full length film Bye Bye Blackbird and his photography series, "Los Raros". He is currently living in France.

== Early life ==
Robinson Savary is the son of theatre director Jérôme Savary and of the painter Sabine Monirys. He was born and raised in Paris, France, and he studied philosophy at La Sorbonne. He lived in Buenos Aires from 2008 to 2012, Argentina where he further developed as an artist and adopted the Argentine citizenship, before returning to Paris.

== Career ==
His professional career begun with the production of "A suivre" (1988) a short film featuring Michael Lonsdale. A few years after he created two other short films: "Falstaff on the moon" (1993) and "Le tango des vitamines" (1995).

In 2005, Robinson Savary directed his debut feature film, Bye Bye Blackbird, a dark fairy tale written by Arif Ali-Shah, featuring James Thiérrée, Jodhi May, Derek Jacobi, Izabella Miko and Michael Lonsdale. Bye Bye Blackbird won Best Photography, Audience Prize and the FIPRESCI Award at the Taormina Film Festival in 2005. The film went to numerous prominent International film festivals such as the Dinard British Film Festival and the Tokyo International Film Festival. Acclaimed by German director, Wim Wenders, the film was released theatrically in France and in Germany. The same year, Robinson Savary released a black & white documentary untitled "James Thiérrée invente La veillée des abysses" which portrayed Bye Bye Blackbird's hero during the rehearsals of a stage performance.

As a photographer specialising in portraits, Robinson Savary has released two series. The first one, untitled "The Originals", released in 2001 gave life to the characters of Bye Bye Blackbird. The second one, untitled "Los Raros" (2009–2011) revealed the intimacy of Buenos Aires transvestites, and was exhibited at the Centro Cultural Borges of Buenos Aires, and at the Castagnino + Macro Museum of Rosario (Argentina).

As a commercial director, Robinson Savary is known for the campaign "Page blanche" he directed for leading french bank Caisse d'épargne in 2011.

== Filmography ==
- A Suivre (1988) (short)
- Falstaff on the moon (1993) (short)
- Le tango des vitamines (1995) (short)
- James Thiérrée invente La veillée des abysses (2003) (documentary)
- Bye Bye Blackbird (2005) (feature)

== Photography ==
- "The Originals" (2001)
- "Los Raros" (2009–2011)

== Books ==
- "Los Raros" (2012) by Ediciones Larivière (Buenos Aires)
