= Arif Ali-Shah =

British film and screenplay writer

- Occupations: Film and screenplay writer, Sufi teacher
- Children: Omar Ali-Shah (second), Sofía Cecilia Ali-Shah
- Parents: Omar Ali-Shah (father); Anna Maria Ali-Shah (mother)
- Family: Shah family

Arif Ali-Shah is a British film writer and screenplay writer. Following in his family's footsteps, he is also a teacher in the Naqshbandi Sufi mystical tradition.

== Life and work ==
Of Afghan Indian origin, Sayyid Hashim Arif Ali-Shah studied and received a degree in literature at the University of Exeter in England.

Ali-Shah is credited as the writer and screenplay writer of the award-winning film Bye Bye Blackbird (2005), an early 20th-century period drama directed by Robinson Savary and starring Sir Derek Jacobi. In the film, a man lives out his dreams by learning to fly on the trapeze. In the end he is unable to continue living on the ground.

The film won the FIPRESCI Prize at the 2005 Taormina International Film Festival and was nominated for the Tokyo Grand Prix at the 2005 Tokyo International Film Festival. The director Robinson Savary previously won a Gold Plaque for Best Experimental Short Film, À suivre (1988), at the 1988 Chicago International Film Festival.

Ali-Shah is also credited as writer of the animated film Papelucho y el Marciano (2007), directed by the Chilean Alejandro Rojas Téllez.

He has worked with film-makers Sir Derek Jacobi, Jodhi May, James Thierree, Niklas Ek, Izabella Miko, Michael Lonsdale and Andrej Acin.

== Sufi lineage ==
Arif Ali-Shah comes from a family line of Afghan nobles and teachers in the Sufi mystical tradition. His father Sayyid Omar Ali-Shah Naqshbandi (1922–2005) and his uncle Sayyid Idries Shah (1924–1996) were both prominent writers and teachers of modern Sufism. Arif Ali-Shah has guided study groups led by professor emeritus Leonard Lewin of CU Boulder, as did his father and uncle.

Arif Ali-Shah is the grandson of the Sirdar Ikbal Ali Shah (1894–1969), an Afghan author, poet, diplomat, scholar, and savant. His great-great-great-grandfather was the Afghan warlord, noble and Sufi teacher, the Nawab Jan-Fishan Khan (d. 1864) who significantly assisted the British in the First Anglo-Afghan War and the subsequent Indian Rebellion of 1857.

== See also ==
- Filmmaking
- Sufism
