= Robert Cecil (diplomat, born 1913) =

British diplomat and writer

Robert Cecil CMG, MA (Camb)
- Born: 25 March 1913; Southbourne, Hampshire, England
- Died: 28 February 1994 (aged 80); Hambledon, Hampshire
- Education: University of Cambridge
- Occupations: Diplomat and writer
- Spouse: Kathleen Marindin
- Children: 1 son and 2 daughters
- Awards: Order of St Michael & St George

Robert Cecil CMG (25 March 1913 – 28 February 1994) was a British diplomat and writer.

== Life, education, and career ==
Robert Cecil was born in Southbourne, a suburb of Bournemouth, Hampshire (now in Dorset) in southern England on 25 March 1913. He was educated at Wellington College and Gonville and Caius College, Cambridge, graduating with a BA (Cantab) in 1935. He married Kathleen Marindin in 1938, and they had one son and two daughters.

He was seconded to Major General Sir Stewart Menzies, the wartime head of MI6, for two years during the war. During his career in the diplomatic service, from 1945 to 1967, Cecil served in the Foreign Office; as First Secretary in Washington, D.C.; as a Counsellor and Consul General in Europe, as Director-General of British Information Services, and latterly as Head of the Cultural Relations Department at the Foreign Office. He had been made a Companion of the Order of St Michael and St George in the 1959 Birthday Honours.

According to Cecil's obituary in The Independent, from childhood he had a close personal relationship with Donald Maclean, and the two both studied at Cambridge and worked together in the Foreign Office. Maclean was a member of the Cambridge Five, who acted as spies for the Soviet Union. There was some speculation that this relationship "cost [Cecil] the promotion to the highest echelons of the diplomatic service which his talents merited." Cecil would later write a biography of Maclean.

Cecil went on to become a reader in Contemporary German History at the University of Reading from 1968 to 1978, and chairman of the Graduate School of Contemporary European Studies from 1976 to 1978, at the University of Reading. From 1968 to 1994 he was chairman of the London-based Institute for Cultural Research (ICR), (Note: Now superseded by The Idries Shah Foundation.) founded by the writer, thinker and teacher in the Sufi mystical tradition, Idries Shah (for whom Cecil wrote an obituary). Cecil wrote three monographs for the institute, and also published several books, including The King's Son, co-compiled for Shah's publishing house, Octagon Press.

As well as his interest in Sufism, Cecil had a prior interest in the esoteric work of the Russian mystic, P. D. Ouspensky. Ouspensky lectured in New York, and had been a student of George Gurdjieff whose school became known as the Fourth Way.

== Death ==
Robert Cecil died in the village of Hambledon, Hampshire on 28 February 1994.

== Works ==
=== ICR monographs ===
- Education and Elitism in Nazi Germany ISBN 978-0-904674-05-7
- Cultural Imperialism ISBN 978-0-904674-06-4
- Cults in 19th Century Britain ISBN 978-0-904674-15-6

=== Books ===
- Life in Edwardian England (Victorian, 1969) ASIN B008OTTMAI
- The Myth Of the Master Race: Alfred Rosenberg and Nazi Ideology (Dodd, Mead & Company, 1972) ISBN 0396065775
- Hitler's Decision to Invade Russia (HarperCollins, 1975) ISBN 0706701828
- The King's Son: Readings in the Traditional Psychologies and Contemporary Thought of Man (co-compiled with Richard Rieu and David Wade, Octagon Press, 1980) ISBN 090086088X
- A Divided Life: a biography of Donald Maclean (The Bodley Head Ltd, 1988) ISBN 0370311299
- The Masks of Death: Changing Attitudes in the Nineteenth Century (The Book Guild, 1991) ISBN 0863326072.

== See also ==
- Nazism
- Alfred Rosenberg (Nazi ideologist)
