= Institute for Cultural Research =

Defunct organization (1965–2013)

The Institute for Cultural Research
- Official logo
- Formation: 1965
- Dissolved: 2013
- Type: NGO, educational charity, publisher
- Purpose: Thought, behaviour and culture
- Headquarters: London, UK
- Director of Studies: Originally Idries Shah
- Website: Official website (archived)

The Institute for Cultural Research (ICR) was a London-based, UK-registered educational charity, events organizer and publisher which aimed to stimulate study, debate, education and research into all aspects of human thought, behaviour and culture. It brought together many distinguished speakers, writers and Fellows over the years.

A statement issued in 2013 by the institute on its official web site read: "As of summer 2013, the Institute has suspended its activities following the formation of a new charity, The Idries Shah Foundation."

== History ==
The institute was founded in 1965 by the well-known writer, thinker and Sufi teacher Idries Shah to facilitate the dissemination of ideas, information and understanding between cultures. Its Objects and Regulations were officially first adopted on 21 January 1966.

In his book Listening to Idries Shah, author, psychotherapist and tutor, Ivan Tyrrell recounts a conversation in which Shah explained his reasons for founding the ICR: "I want to attract ordinary people and help them think about psychological and cultural issues. But, as an individual, I can't easily get people to listen seriously. I discovered, however, that if I call myself an 'institute' – they will," Shah told him. Tyrrell adds: "I heard [Shah] say many times over the years, 'We live in an appearance culture' [...] That is one reason why it was necessary for him to create ICR: people like to join an organisation and be part of a community."

Based for some time at Tunbridge Wells in Kent, the institute was later based in London. Shah acted as the institute's Director of Studies whilst still alive. Nobel Prize-winning novelist Doris Lessing, who was influenced by Idries Shah, also contributed to the institute.

== Aims and remit ==
The institute's stated aim was "to stimulate study, debate, education and research into all aspects of human thought, behaviour and culture" and to make the results of its members' academic work accessible to society and also to academics working in different fields.

The body, which had a number of distinguished Fellows, published several dozen academic monographs and some books over the years and held regular events. These events usually included a series of six lectures by specialists per year, and a two-day seminar which is usually held in the Autumn. The aim of these was "to connect ideas across disciplines, across cultures, and even through history" and to bring about a broader, more holistic understanding by looking at issues from several different perspectives, with particular interest in human thought and behaviour and issues neglected by contemporary culture.

In addition, the Institute supported projects in areas where freedom of access to facts was threatened, for example in the case of Afghanistan where assistance had been given to the United Nations Children's Fund (UNICEF)'s female educational projects.

All the Institute for Cultural Research's activities were open to the general public.

== Notable contributors ==
The institute published so many monographs and hosted so many lectures and seminars that only a small sample of notable contributors are listed here.

Lecturers included:

- ecologist, adventurer and writer John P. Allen (Cultures and Biomes of the Biosphere)
- psychologist Michael Eysenck (Lost in Time, Making Sense of Amnesia)
- neuroscientist Professor Chris Frith (how the brain creates our mental and social worlds)
- British social anthropologist Professor Tim Ingold (the mismatch between the "environment" of immediate experience and the "Environment" of scientific and policy discourse)
- writer and documentary filmmaker Tahir Shah (the scientific legacies of the Arab Caliphates and their Golden Age)
- writer and filmmaker Iain Sinclair (Hackney, That Rose-Red Empire)
- poet, writer and adventurer Robert Twigger (Polymaths in a monopathic world?)
- anthropologist Piers Vitebsky (Global religious change and the death of the shaman)
- novelist, short story writer, historian and mythographer Marina Warner (Talismans and Charms: Spellbinding in Stories from The 1001 Nights)
- writer Ramsay Wood (The Kalila and Dimna Story)

Monograph writers included:

- science writer Philip Ball (Collective Behaviour and the Physics of Society)
- diplomat and writer Robert Cecil (Cults in 19th Century Britain, Cultural Imperialism, and Education and Elitism in Nazi Germany)
- professor of psychiatry Arthur J. Deikman (Evaluating Spiritual and Utopian Groups)
- psychologist and noted skeptic Chris French (Paranormal Perception? A Critical Evaluation)
- co-founder of the Club of Rome in 1968, Dr. Alexander King (Science, Technology and the Quality of Life and An Eye to the Future)
- Nobel Prize-winning novelist Doris Lessing (Problems, Myths and Stories)
- professor of telecommunications Leonard Lewin (Science and the Paranormal)
- professor of archaeology Steven Mithen (Problem-solving and the Evolution of Human Culture)
- writer and psychologist Robert E. Ornstein (Physiological Studies of Consciousness)
- biochemist, plant physiologist and parapsychologist Rupert Sheldrake (Fields of the Mind)

Books published by the ICR included Cultural Research edited by the writer Tahir Shah, and Cultural Encounters: Essays on the interactions of diverse cultures now and in the past, edited by Robert Cecil and David Wade.

== See also ==
- Cross-cultural studies
- Culture
- Human behavior
- Category:People associated with the Institute for Cultural Research
- Think Global
- The Idries Shah Foundation (2013 onwards)

=== People, publications and events ===
- Fellows
- Monographs
- Lectures
- Seminars
