= Double Identity (film) =

- Directed by: Dennis Dimster
- Written by: Dennis Dimster; Zvia Dimbort
- Produced by: Zvia Dimbort; Boaz Davidson
- Starring: Val Kilmer; Izabella Miko
- Cinematography: Lorenzo Senatore
- Distributed by: Nu Image; Millennium Films
- Release dates: November 14, 2009 (Bulgaria); December 8, 2009 (United States)
- Running time: 97 minutes
- Country: United States
- Languages: English; Bulgarian; Russian

Double Identity is a 2009 American crime thriller film directed by Dennis Dimster and starring Val Kilmer and Izabella Miko, originally titled Fake Identity. It was released in early 2010 on DVD and Blu-ray.

== Plot ==
An American doctor, Dr. Nicholas Pinter (Val Kilmer), working in Bulgaria for Doctors Beyond Borders, is mistakenly identified as a secret agent by the Russian mob. He escapes a close brush with death and is then rescued by the British Secret Service and a beautiful but mysterious woman named Katrine (Izabella Miko). His life dramatically changes when he helps this mysterious woman escape from her would-be assailant.

== Cast ==
- Val Kilmer as Dr. Nicholas Pinter / John Charter
- Izabella Miko as Katrine
- Julian Wadham as Sterling
- Hristo Shopov as Serik Doulov
- Michael Cronin as Allen Jacob
- Valentine Pelka as Matthew Murdoch
- Valentin Ganev as Ludvik Seifert
- Rushi Vidinliev as Agent Finney
- Zahari Baharov as Alexander
- Velislav Pavlov as Aslan
- Emil Markov as Detective
- Stanislav Pishtalov as General Lebedev
- Yulian Vergov as Victor Krastev
- Jeremy Zimmerman as Agent Davies
- Yavor Baharov as Agent Bouquet
- Raicho Vasilev as George Walther
- Kenneth Hughes as Mr. Pimstone
- Asen Blatechki as Bodyguard
- Daniel Perrone as Dr. Paulo Ivanov
- Harry Anichkin as Minister Vadim Abilov
- Nickolay Hadjimenov as Malik Gelayev
- Vladimir Kolev as Interrogation Detective
