= Flakes (film) =

2007 American comedy film

- DVD cover
- Directed by: Michael Lehmann
- Written by: Chris Poche; Karey Kirkpatrick
- Produced by: Gary Winick; Jake Abraham; Mark Ross; Karey Kirkpatrick
- Starring: Aaron Stanford; Zooey Deschanel; Keir O'Donnell; Ryan Donowho; Frank Wood; Izabella Miko; Christopher Lloyd
- Cinematography: Nancy Schreiber
- Edited by: Lynzee Klingman; Nicholas C. Smith
- Music by: Jason Derlatka; Jon Ehrlich
- Production company: IFC First Take
- Distributed by: IFC Films
- Release date: December 19, 2007
- Running time: 84 minutes
- Country: United States
- Language: English
- Box office: $778

Flakes is a 2007 American comedy film directed by Michael Lehmann and starring Aaron Stanford and Zooey Deschanel. This film was written by Chris Poche & Karey Kirkpatrick.

== Plot ==
Struggling musician Neal Downs works as manager of a little New Orleans eatery called Flakes, owned by an old hippie, Willie Bergeron, that serves nothing but cold cereal to its loyal clientele. When a rival franchise opens up across the street, Neal's girlfriend, the self-named Pussy Katz, applies for a job at the new establishment as a means of getting back at Neal for refusing to hire her at his place.

== Cast ==
- Aaron Stanford as Neal Downs
- Zooey Deschanel as Miss Pussy Katz
- Christopher Lloyd as Willie Bergeron
- Ryan Donowho as Skinny Larry
- Carol Sutton as Miss Lucille
- Frank Wood as Bruce
- B.J. Hopper as Old Tom
- Jane Brody as Tourist Woman
- Keir O'Donnell as Stuart
- Brent Kirkpatrick as R Cafe Lead Singer
- Izabella Miko as Strawberry
- Walter Breaux as Homeless Man
- Tony Molino as Police Officer
- Margaret Lawhon as News Reporter
- Maria Mason as Woman Customer
- Ian Blanco as New Original Flakes Employee
- Mark Krasnoff as Enrique
- Tim Francis as Antoine's Fat Cat
- John McConnell as Ashton Hale
- Anthony Michael Frederick as Process Serving Deputy
- Marco John as Tres
- Ann Mahoney as Astrid
- Dave Davis as Stoner #1
- Kevin Breen as Stoner #2

== Release and reception ==
Flakes was released in one theater on December 19, 2007. In the opening weekend (21–23), the film earned $311 at number 76. It lasted 9 days before closing and only being able to make $778.

As of August 2021, the film holds a 22% approval rating on the review aggregator site Rotten Tomatoes, based on 18 reviews with an average score of 4.4/10.
