= Ramsay Wood =

British writer & photographer

Ramsay Wood is the author of two sui generis modern novels which aim – via vernacular spiels within complex frame-story narratives – to popularize the pre-literate, oral story-listening drama of multicultural animal fables mimed and declaimed along the ancient Silk Road. His books blend The Jatakas Tales, The Panchatantra and the likely (fourth century BCE) role of Alexander the Great's legacy in "bringing the Aesopian tradition to North India and Central Asia" via Hellenization in Central Asia and India. Wood's Kalila and Dimna – Selected Fables of Bidpai (Vol 1) was published by Knopf in 1980 with an Introduction by Nobel laureate Doris Lessing.

A Times Literary Supplement (3/3/82) review stated that

"Wood has produced a vigorous modern version . . . overlaid with a racy personal idiom, a witty mixture of archaic grandiloquence, modern slang, and (in some passages) the jargon of sociology, television and local government . . . his version will certainly be much more attractive to modern readers than the older translations, with their drier narratives and unfamiliar oriental hyperbole".

== Early fable compilations as examples of remix culture ==
In a 2011 lecture in Fez, Morocco he suggested that these inter-woven ancient fables provide one of the earliest literary examples of what Lawrence Lessig calls remix culture. Wood stated that in hundreds of literary reconfigurations, various arrangements of The Jatakas Tales, Aesop and The Panchatantra fables are known by separate titles in different languages at different times in different places. Yet each unique cultural remix always harkens back to an oral, often pre-literate, storytelling society in ancient Greece or India. No original Sanskrit Panchatantra nor Greek Aesop text survives: only theoretically reconstructed scholarly compilations from several diverse sources.

We thus only can study the many recompiled derivative works and variants of the missing original Panchatantra, of which the few surviving medieval Arabic Kalila wa Dimna manuscripts by Ibn al-Muqaffa (750 CE) remain as the keynote pivots between ancient India and modern Europe.

Ibn al-Muqaffa is also personally responsible for the profuse flowering of Islamic manuscript illustration that uniquely stems from Kalila wa Dimna, for his Preface to it clearly states that two of the book's four intentions (specifically, the second and the third) are

"to show the images (khayalat) of the animals in varieties of paints and colours (asbagh, alwan) so as to delight the hearts of princes, increase their pleasure and also the degree of care which they would bestow on the work. Thirdly, it was intended that the book should be such that both kings and common folk should not cease to acquire it; that it might be repeatedly copied and recreated in the course of time thus giving work to the painter (musawwir) and the copyist (nasikh)".

== First English remix by Sir Thomas North in 1570 ==
The Panchatantra fables first appeared in English as The Morall Philosophie of Doni in 1570, translated from the Italian by Sir Thomas North, who also translated Plutarch's Lives. Wood's two Kalila and Dimna volumes are the first modern English, multiple-sourced, remix of these ancient fables since North's version. Wood's Kalila and Dimna – Fables of Friendship and Betrayal (Vol 1) is reconstituted from the North text and also seven other works translated from Sanskrit, Arabic, Syriac and Persian.

== Doris Lessing and the Institute for Cultural Research ==
In her introduction to all seven English editions of Kalila and Dimna (Vol 1) Doris Lessing supports Wood's remix contention (and does so again in her monograph, Problems, Myths and Stories). Lessing also cites several literary variants of The Panchatantra. Her Introduction was reprinted in her 2005 collection of essays, Time Bites: Views and Reviews.

At the London 2009 Institute for Cultural Research's Seminar entitled The Power of Stories Wood gave a lecture The Kalila and Dimna Story – How an ancient 'book' left home. It featured illustrations from a wide range of Arabic and Persian manuscripts, all exemplifying Ibn al-Muqaffa's original 750 CE injunction that his work "be repeatedly copied and recreated in the course of time thus giving work to the painter and the copyist".

In October 2011 the Institute for Cultural Research published Monograph Series No 59 wherein Wood follows up this theme in greater detail: Extraordinary Voyages of the Panchatantra. An extended English version of this monograph, including an Appendix (how we limit our understanding of the word "story"), appears as an Afterword in the December 2011 Medina (UK) and Al Kotob Khan (Egypt) co-edition of Wood's second Kalila and Dimna volume, Fables of Conflict and Intrigue. It also is published in the same title's 2011 Kindle edition.

== Edinburgh Festival 1984 ==
In 1983, Wood's Kalila and Dimna (Vol 1) was turned into a play entitled A Word in the Stargazer's Eye by Stuart Cox of Theatr Taliesin Wales. The show premiered at the 1984 Edinburgh Festival, starring the actor Nigel Watson. The Scotsman reviewed it thus

"A stunning performance, bridging the gap of understanding between East and West. We are blessed a while with the wonderment of children as we listen to these eternal tales of the human psyche. A show for every nationality under the sun."

— The Scotsman

== French editions: 2006, 2019 & 2020 ==
In 2006 Éditions Albin Michel published a French translation of his 1980 first volume. A review by Roger-Pol Droit in Le Monde on 15 September 2006 said:

Crossing linguistic and cultural frontiers, these fables also transcend conventional time-frames. They abound with temporal paradoxes. Ancient letters, locked in a series of smaller and smaller treasure chests by King Houschenk in the past, are addressed to kings of the future. They contain words of advice whose meaning only becomes gradually clear, sometimes after a very big delay.

In September 2019 Éditions Desclée de Brouwer published a revised mass market paperback edition. In 2020 they published a revised translation entitled Conflits et intrigues of the 2011 Medina (Vol 2) English edition.
