= 2001 MTV Movie Awards =

American film awards ceremony

- Date: Saturday, June 2, 2001
- Location: Shrine Auditorium, Los Angeles, California
- Country: United States
- Hosted by: Jimmy Fallon; Kirsten Dunst

Television/radio coverage
- Network: MTV

The 2001 MTV Movie Awards aired on MTV on Saturday, June 2, 2001 from the Shrine Auditorium in Los Angeles, California, and were hosted by Jimmy Fallon and Kirsten Dunst. The program featured performances from Christina Aguilera, Lil' Kim, Mýa and Pink (Moulin Rouge!), Dave Matthews Band and Weezer. Sofia Coppola was presented with an award for Best New Filmmaker. This was Aaliyah's last awards show appearance before her death two months later.

== Performers ==
- Christina Aguilera, Lil' Kim, Mýa, and Pink — "Lady Marmalade"
- Dave Matthews Band — "The Space Between"
- Weezer — "Hash Pipe"

== Presenters ==
- Shannon Elizabeth, Alyson Hannigan, Tara Reid and Mena Suvari — presented Best On-Screen Team
- Ziyi Zhang and David Spade — presented Breakthrough Male
- Nicole Kidman — introduced Christina Aguilera, Lil' Kim, Mýa, and Pink
- Brendan Fraser and The Rock — presented Best Action Sequence
- Samuel L. Jackson — presented Best Villain
- Destiny's Child — presented Breakthrough Female
- Kirsten Dunst — introduced Dave Matthews Band
- Aaliyah and P. Diddy — presented Best Dance Sequence
- Marlon and Shawn Wayans — presented Best Female Performance
- George Lucas — presented Best New Filmmaker
- Jackie Chan and Chris Tucker — presented Best Fight
- Johnny Knoxville and Julia Stiles — presented Best Comedic Performance
- Drea de Matteo, Chris Klein and Seann William Scott — introduced Weezer
- Ashton Kutcher and Christina Ricci — presented Best Kiss
- Cameron Diaz and Mike Myers — presented Best Male Performance
- Halle Berry, Hugh Jackman and John Travolta — presented Best Movie

== Awards ==
Below are the list of nominations. Winners are listed at the top of each list in bold.

=== Best Movie ===
Gladiator

- Crouching Tiger, Hidden Dragon
- Erin Brockovich
- Hannibal
- X-Men

=== Best Male Performance ===
Tom Cruise – Mission: Impossible 2

- Russell Crowe – Gladiator
- Omar Epps – Love & Basketball
- Mel Gibson – The Patriot
- Tom Hanks – Cast Away

=== Best Female Performance ===
Julia Roberts - Erin Brockovich

- Aaliyah – Romeo Must Die
- Kate Hudson – Almost Famous
- Jennifer Lopez – The Cell
- Julia Stiles – Save the Last Dance

=== Breakthrough Male ===
Sean Patrick Thomas – Save the Last Dance

- Jack Black – High Fidelity
- Patrick Fugit – Almost Famous
- Tom Green – Road Trip
- Hugh Jackman – X-Men
- Ashton Kutcher – Dude, Where's My Car?

=== Breakthrough Female ===
Erika Christensen – Traffic

- Aaliyah – Romeo Must Die
- Anna Faris – Scary Movie
- Piper Perabo – Coyote Ugly
- Zhang Ziyi – Crouching Tiger, Hidden Dragon

=== Best On-Screen Team ===
Drew Barrymore, Cameron Diaz and Lucy Liu (Charlie's Angels) – Charlie's Angels

- Ben Stiller and Robert De Niro – Meet the Parents
- George Clooney, John Turturro and Tim Blake Nelson (The Soggy Bottom Boys) – O Brother, Where Art Thou?
- Tom Hanks and Wilson – Cast Away
- Halle Berry, Hugh Jackman, James Marsden and Anna Paquin (the X-Men) – X-Men

=== Best Villain ===
Jim Carrey – Dr. Seuss' How the Grinch Stole Christmas

- Kevin Bacon – Hollow Man
- Vincent D'Onofrio – The Cell
- Anthony Hopkins – Hannibal
- Joaquin Phoenix – Gladiator

=== Best Comedic Performance ===
Ben Stiller – Meet the Parents

- Jim Carrey – Me, Myself & Irene
- Martin Lawrence – Big Momma's House
- Eddie Murphy – Nutty Professor II: The Klumps
- Tom Green – Road Trip

=== Best Kiss ===
Julia Stiles and Sean Patrick Thomas – Save the Last Dance

- Jon Abrahams and Anna Faris – Scary Movie
- Ben Affleck and Gwyneth Paltrow – Bounce
- Tom Hanks and Helen Hunt – Cast Away
- Anthony Hopkins and Julianne Moore – Hannibal

=== Best Action Sequence ===
Motorcycle Chase – Mission: Impossible 2

- Car Chase Through Construction Site – Gone in 60 Seconds
- Roman Army vs. Germanic Horde – Gladiator
- Plane Crash – Cast Away

=== Best Dance Sequence ===
Cameron Diaz — "Heaven Must Be Missing an Angel" (from Charlie's Angels)

- Kirsten Dunst, Lindsay Sloane, Clare Kramer, Nicole Bilderback, Tsianina Joelson, Rini Bell, Bianca Kajlich, Nathan West and Huntley Ritter (The Cheerleaders from Bring It On) — "I'm Sexy, I'm Cute" (from Bring It On)
- Jamie Bell and Julie Walters — "Royal Ballet School" (from Billy Elliot)
- Julia Stiles and Sean Patrick Thomas — "You Can Do It" (from Save the Last Dance)

=== Best Musical Sequence ===
Piper Perabo — "One Way or Another" (from Coyote Ugly)

- Jack Black — "Let's Get It On" (from High Fidelity)
- George Clooney, Tim Blake Nelson and John Turturro — "Man of Constant Sorrow" (from O Brother, Where Art Thou?)
- Breckin Meyer, Seann William Scott, Paulo Costanzo and DJ Qualls — "I Wanna Rock" (from Road Trip)
- Patrick Fugit, Kate Hudson, Billy Crudup, Jason Lee and Anna Paquin — "Tiny Dancer" (from Almost Famous)

=== Best Fight ===
Zhang Ziyi vs. Entire Bar – Crouching Tiger, Hidden Dragon

- Drew Barrymore vs. Attackers – Charlie's Angels
- Russell Crowe vs. Masked Opponent and Tiger – Gladiator
- Jet Li vs. Attackers – Romeo Must Die

=== Best Line ===
"Are You a Pothead, Focker?" — Robert De Niro (from Meet the Parents)

- "I Am a Golden God!" — Billy Crudup (from Almost Famous)
- "It Vexes Me, I Am Terribly Vexed" — Joaquin Phoenix (from Gladiator)
- "I Signed That Release Wavier, So You Can Just Feel Free to Stick Things in My Slot" — Cameron Diaz (from Charlie's Angels)
- "Bite My Ass, Krispy Kreme" — Julia Roberts (from Erin Brockovich)

=== Best Cameo ===
James Van Der Beek – Scary Movie

- Andy Dick – Road Trip
- Tom Green – Charlie's Angels
- Ozzy Osbourne – Little Nicky
- Bruce Springsteen – High Fidelity

=== Best Dressed ===
Jennifer Lopez – The Cell

- Kate Hudson – Almost Famous
- Elizabeth Hurley – Bedazzled
- Samuel L. Jackson – Shaft
- Lucy Liu – Charlie's Angels

=== Best New Filmmaker ===
- **Sofia Coppola – The Virgin Suicides**
