= Leonard Lewin (engineer) =

English electrical engineer (1919–2007)

- Born: 22 July 1919; Essex, England
- Died: 13 August 2007 (aged 88); Louisville, Colorado, US
- Spouse: Daphne Smith
- Children: David Ian Lewin; Wendy Patricia Lewin
- Scientific career
- Fields: Electrical engineering
- Institutions: Marconi Company; Admiralty Signals and Radar Establishment; Standard Telecommunication Laboratories; University of Colorado Boulder

Leonard Lewin (22 July 1919 – 13 August 2007) was a British telecommunications engineer and educator. Later emigrating to the United States, Lewin became Professor of Electrical and Computer Engineering at the University of Colorado Boulder. He was the author and holder of 40 patents and wrote, co-wrote, or edited nearly 200 technical publications.

== Early life and career ==
Lewin was born on 22 July 1919 in Southend-on-Sea, Essex, England. Educated at Southend High School for Boys, and studying "mathematics with particular reference to transcendental functions and the electromagnetic theory of radiation," he first found employment in 1937 with the Marconi Wireless Telegraph Company. In 1941 he became a radio instructor and from then until the end of World War II he served with the Admiralty Signal Establishment (ASE) as a Temporary Experimental Officer, researching radar, radio antenna and mirror design, and in 1945 he served as chairman of the Inter-Service Committee on Radar Camouflage.

After the war, in 1946, Lewin worked for Standard Telecommunication Laboratories at Enfield, North London as a senior engineer and in 1950 he was appointed head of the Microwave Engineering department.

== Academic career ==
In 1968, Lewin emigrated to the United States and embarked on an academic career. Joining the University of Colorado, he took up the post of Professor of Electrical Engineering, being made a Fellow of the Institute of Electrical and Electronics Engineers (IEEE), and ultimately becoming Director of the Interdisciplinary Telecommunications Program, run by the College of Engineering and Applied Sciences. He was also a Fellow of the British Interplanetary Society.

== Patents, awards, lectures and publications ==
=== Patents ===
During his career, Leonard Lewin authored and was granted 40 patents.

=== Awards ===
In 1962, Lewin was awarded the Microwave Prize by the IEEE Microwave Theory and Techniques Society.

In 1967, The University of Colorado awarded Lewin an Honorary Doctorate of Science (D.Sc.).

In 1981, Lewin became a Fulbright scholar, and he lectured in Austria, Turkey and Yugoslavia.

In 1981 and 1990, Lewin lectured at the École nationale supérieure des télécommunications in Paris, France.

In 1987 Lewin gave the IEEE (New Zealand) National Prestige lecture on the topic of education.

In 1990, Lewin lectured at the University of Auckland in New Zealand. He was also invited to speak at the 1990 International Congress of Mathematicians in Kyoto, Japan.

In 1991, Lewin lectured at the Max Planck Institute for Mathematics in Bonn, Germany.

In 1993, after his retirement, Lewin received the Microwave Career Award from the Institute of Electrical and Electronics Engineers (IEEE) Microwave Theory and Techniques Society.

=== Publications ===
Lewin also wrote, co-wrote, or edited nearly 200 technical publications, including more than 10 research books on waveguides, mathematics and telecommunications.

Technical publications include:

- Reflection Cancellation in Waveguides (1950, author)
- Advanced Theory of Waveguides (1951, author)
- Interference in Multi-Channel Circuits (1951, author)
- Note on Reactive Elements for Broad-Band Impedance Matching (1952, author)
- Dilogarithms and Associated Functions (1958, author)
- Explanatory notes on the use of singular integral equations in the solution of waveguide discontinuity problems (1963, author)
- The reactance of a symmetrical pair of strips in rectangular waveguide (1963, author)
- Theory of Waveguides: Techniques for the Solution of Waveguide Problems (1975, author)
- Some Comments on the Time-Causal Characteristics of Leaky and Surface Waves (1976, author)
- Electromagnetic waves and curved structures (IEE electromagnetic waves series / Institution of Electrical Engineers, 1977, co-author)
- Telecommunications: An Interdisciplinary Survey (1979, editor)
- Polylogarithms and Associated Functions (1981, author)
- Telecommunications in the U.S.: Trends and Policies (Telecommunications Library, 1981, editor)
- Telecommunications: An Interdisciplinary Text (Artech House Telecom Library, 1984, editor)
- Education, the Hidden Agenda (1987, author)
- The Educational Background and Opportunities (1987, author)
- Structural Properties of Polylogarithms (Mathematical Surveys and Monographs) (1991, editor)

Sufi-related publications include:

- The Diffusion of Sufi Ideas in the West: An anthology of new writings by and about Idries Shah (1972, editor)
- The Elephant in the Dark (1976, editor)
- Science and the Paranormal (The Institute for Cultural Research, 1979, author)
- "Sufi Studies: East and West" in The World of the Sufi (1979, contributor)

The Diffusion of Sufi Ideas in the West won an award from UNESCO's 1972 International Book Year.

== Later life ==
On his retirement from the University of Colorado in 1986, Lewin was made Professor Emeritus and continued to lecture for several years after that time. He died on 13 August 2007 at a hospice in Louisville, Colorado.

== Other interests ==
Interested in education, philosophy and spirituality, Leonard Lewin served on the District Accountability Committee and the Advisory Committee for the Talented and Gifted in the Boulder Valley School District. He was also a student of Sufi mysticism and established and led study groups under the guidance of Idries Shah, Shah's brother Omar Ali-Shah and Ali-Shah's son, Arif Ali-Shah.
