= Save the Last Dance 2 =

- DVD cover
- Directed by: David Petrarca
- Written by: Kwame Nyanning
- Based on: Characters by Duane Adler
- Produced by: Robert W. Cort; Eric Hetzel
- Starring: Izabella Miko; Columbus Short; Aubrey Dollar
- Cinematography: David A. Makin
- Edited by: Trudy Ship
- Music by: Marcus Miller
- Production companies: MTV Films; Robert Cort Productions
- Distributed by: Paramount Home Entertainment
- Release date: October 10, 2006
- Running time: 92 minutes
- Country: United States
- Language: English
- Budget: $5 million

Save the Last Dance 2 (also known as Save the Last Dance 2: Stepping Up) is a 2006 dance drama film and a sequel to the 2001 film Save the Last Dance. It was released to DVD on October 10, 2006, by Paramount Home Entertainment and MTV. While featuring some returning characters, none of the original cast are retained from the original film. R&B singer Ne-Yo makes an appearance in the film.

== Plot ==
The film continues the story of Sara Johnson (originally played by Julia Stiles and now portrayed by Izabella Miko). She recalls how she was born to be a dancer. Her mother would often comment that she knew how to pirouette before she could properly walk. From her earliest memories Sara always wanted to be a ballerina, a graceful dancer who could glide across the stage. Inspired by her Idol Philomena Kerplunk played by Suze Williams, It seemed that there was something that caused conflict in Sara's ambition. She also loves the urban dance form of hip-hop. While ballet is highly structured, full of rules and standards, hip-hop gives Sara a chance to let go and follow the beat. Sara wants the best of both worlds but the conflict between structure and independence affects her performance in both genres.

The film is set soon after the original. Sara has made the first part of her dream come true. Her audition with the Juilliard School of Dance worked out well and she was accepted, resulting in her moving from Chicago to New York City. Sara would soon find out that as rough as it was to get there, staying would require raising the bar to almost painful heights. Her idol and ballet instructor, Monique Delacroix (Jacqueline Bisset), is old school when it comes to demanding each student master the traditional and arduous curriculum. She has little to no use for the influence of any other form of dance on ballet, so the concept of hip-hop is not only foreign to the staid teacher, it is repugnant.

During orientation on her first day at Juilliard, Sara meets Miles Sultana (Columbus Short), who takes her for a trombone player. When she tells him she is there for ballet, he questions whether she is a ballerina. Sara boldly states that she is already a ballerina; she is there to become a prima ballerina. This sets up a playful antagonism that later develops into a romantic relationship. Sara also has to deal with the students at her new school. In a high pressure school like Juilliard, the more favor you gather with the teachers the more jealousy you encounter from the students. It is a cut-throat environment with an extremely high failure rate.

Among her new classmates is Marcus (Matthew Watling), who infuriates Delacroix the first day for wearing pants that 'swish'. Then there is Katrina (Maria Brooks), who is destined to be the main rival for Sara. It also turns out that Miles is actually her guest lecturer for 'Introduction to Hip-Hop Theory'. Miles invites Sara and her new roommate Zoe to a club, where Sara demonstrates her skills by having a dance off with local dance star and club favorite Candy (Tracey "Tre" Armstrong). Due to her late night partying, she is late for her ballet class and is scolded and punished by Ms Delacroix.

Struggling to stay, Sara tries to save herself from being dismissed by working extremely hard, which makes her decline Miles's request for her to design choreography for an art exhibit he's involved with. In pain and desperation, Sara takes pills offered to her by Katrina to lose weight and relieve the pain in her joints. After vomiting in Delacroix's office and having the pills noted in the bucket, she is assured that she is not being cut and advised not to take them anymore. She continues to work hard and improves daily. She also agrees to help Miles with his project. During a chance meeting with Philiomena Kerplunk (Suze Williams) Philly convinces Sara that she will have the last dance and that she is still as hip as she was in the first movie.

Delacroix properly supports her after Sara demonstrates her talent, causing Katrina to become even more jealous. Katrina gets the lead in Giselle, but is injured during practice. Sara must now take her part, which is extremely technically demanding. Sara works relentlessly, struggling between her two commitments. Katrina, in a final act of revenge, reveals Sara's relationship with Miles to Delacroix. It is revealed that Delacroix is Miles's mother. She discusses Sara's future with Miles and encourages him to end their relationship so it doesn't interfere with her fulfilling her dreams.

Sara withdraws from her participation in the gallery project and focuses on the ballet performance. During rehearsal, she is confronted by Zoe and Miles's friend Franz (Ian Brennan) about refusing to assist with the gallery project even though Miles is struggling. Zoe angrily accuses Sara of becoming Delacroix. Sara is also informed that the dress rehearsal for the gallery project is on the night of her ballet performance and no one from that group will be able to see her as Giselle. Right before the ballet performance, Zoe comes and apologizes for her behavior and delivers a CD from Miles of him playing piano. She performs her role as Giselle flawlessly, but finds in the end that she feels nothing despite her tremendous success. She declines to attend the afterparty full of industry luminaries and tells Delacroix that she is not willing to sacrifice love, friendship, and happiness for ballet. She leaves and goes to the dress rehearsal, makes up with Miles, and performs the piece she choreographed, finally looking happy.

== Cast ==
- Izabella Miko as Sara Johnson
- Columbus Short as Miles Sultana
- Jacqueline Bisset as Monique Delacroix
- Maria Brooks as Katrina
- Aubrey Dollar as Zoe
- Ian Brennan as Franz
- Tracey "Tre" Armstrong as Candy
- Seana McKenna as Simone Eldair
- Ne-Yo as Mixx

== Reception ==
Christopher Null of Filmcritic.com was critical of the film, stating it "retreads the original Dance pretty much completely". He noted that Miko lacks the girl-next-door charm of Stiles, but suggested she does make for a more credible ballerina.

== Home media ==
The film was released on DVD October 10, 2006. The DVD includes a making of feature.
