= List of 2004 box office number-one films in the United States =

This is a list of films which have placed number one at the weekend box office in the United States during 2004.

== Number-one films ==
†	This implies the highest-grossing movie of the year.

#	Weekend end date	Film	Box office	Notes	Ref
1	January 4, 2004	The Lord of the Rings: The Return of the King	$28,180,378		
2	January 11, 2004	The Lord of the Rings: The Return of the King	$14,209,098	The Lord of the Rings: The Return of the King became the first film since The Lord of the Rings: The Fellowship of the Ring to top the box office for four consecutive weekends.	
3	January 18, 2004	Along Came Polly	$27,721,185		
4	January 25, 2004	The Butterfly Effect	$17,065,227		
5	February 1, 2004	You Got Served	$16,123,105	You Got Served broke She's All That's record ($16 million) for the highest Super Bowl weekend debut.	
6	February 8, 2004	Barbershop 2: Back in Business	$24,241,612		
7	February 15, 2004	50 First Dates	$39,852,237	50 First Dates broke Sweet Home Alabama's record ($35.6 million) for the highest weekend debut for a romantic comedy.	
8	February 22, 2004	50 First Dates	$20,427,325		
9	February 29, 2004	The Passion of the Christ	$83,848,082	The Passion of the Christ broke Hannibal's records ($58 million) for the highest weekend debut in February and for a winter release.	
10	March 7, 2004	The Passion of the Christ	$53,246,801		
11	March 14, 2004	The Passion of the Christ	$32,130,978		
12	March 21, 2004	Dawn of the Dead	$26,722,575	Dawn of the Dead broke Resident Evil's record ($17.7 million) for highest weekend debut for a zombie film.	
13	March 28, 2004	Scooby-Doo 2: Monsters Unleashed	$29,438,331	James Gunn became the first screenwriter in history to have two back to back number 1 films as he wrote both Dawn of the Dead and Scooby-Doo 2: Monsters Unleashed.	
14	April 4, 2004	Hellboy	$23,172,440		
15	April 11, 2004	The Passion of the Christ	$15,216,723	The Passion of the Christ reclaimed #1 in its seventh weekend on the Easter holiday, making it the first film since Titanic to top the box office in its seventh weekend. It also became the first film since The Lord of the Rings: The Return of the King to top the box office for four weekends as well as the first film since Toy Story to top the box office for four non-consecutive weekends.	
16	April 18, 2004	Kill Bill: Volume 2	$25,104,949		
17	April 25, 2004	Man on Fire	$22,751,490		
18	May 2, 2004	Mean Girls	$24,432,195		
19	May 9, 2004	Van Helsing	$51,748,040	Van Helsing broke Interview with the Vampire's record ($36.3 million) for the highest weekend debut for a vampire film.	
20	May 16, 2004	Troy	$46,865,412		
21	May 23, 2004	Shrek 2 †	$108,038,878	Shrek 2 broke Finding Nemo's record ($70.3 million) for the highest weekend debut for an animated film and Harry Potter and the Sorcerer's Stone's record ($90.3 million) for the highest weekend debut for a PG-rated film. Its $44.8 million gross on Saturday broke Spider-Man's record ($43.6 million) for largest single day tally of all time. Shrek 2 had the highest weekend debut of 2004.	
22	May 30, 2004	Shrek 2 †	$72,170,363	Shrek 2 broke Spider-Man's record ($71.4 million) for the highest second weekend gross, and The Lost World: Jurassic Park's record ($72.1 million) for the highest Memorial Day weekend ever. In second place, The Day After Tomorrow's $68.7 million opening weekend broke Lilo & Stitch's record ($35.2 million) for the highest weekend debut for a film that did not open in first place as well as Erin Brockovich's record ($28.1 million) for the highest weekend debut for an environmentalist film.	
23	June 6, 2004	Harry Potter and the Prisoner of Azkaban	$93,687,367	Harry Potter and the Prisoner of Azkaban broke Hulk's record ($62.1 million) for the highest weekend debut in June. It also broke The Matrix Reloaded's record ($91.8 million) for the highest opening for a Warner Bros. film.	
24	June 13, 2004	Harry Potter and the Prisoner of Azkaban	$34,910,393		
25	June 20, 2004	Dodgeball: A True Underdog Story	$30,070,196		
26	June 27, 2004	Fahrenheit 9/11	$23,920,637	Fahrenhelt 9/11 held the record for the highest weekend debut in less than 1,000 theaters.	
27	July 4, 2004	Spider-Man 2	$88,156,227	Spider-Man 2's opening day gross of $40.4 million broke Spider-Man's record ($39.4 million) for the highest opening day gross and The Lord of the Rings: The Return of the King's record ($34.5 million) for the highest Wednesday gross of all-time. It also broke Austin Powers in Goldmember's record ($73.1 million) for the highest weekend debut in July and Men in Black II's record ($52.1 million) for the highest Fourth of July weekend debut.	
28	July 11, 2004	Spider-Man 2	$45,180,743		
29	July 18, 2004	I, Robot	$52,179,887		
30	July 25, 2004	The Bourne Supremacy	$52,521,865		
31	August 1, 2004	The Village	$50,746,142	The Village broke Scary Movie 3's record ($48.1 million) for highest weekend debut for a film featuring a female protagonist.	
32	August 8, 2004	Collateral	$24,701,458		
33	August 15, 2004	Alien vs. Predator	$38,291,056		
34	August 22, 2004	Exorcist: The Beginning	$18,054,001		
35	August 29, 2004	Hero	$18,004,319	Hero broke Crouching Tiger, Hidden Dragon's record ($8.6 million) for the highest weekend debut for a foreign language film.	
36	September 5, 2004	Hero	$8,807,757		
37	September 12, 2004	Resident Evil: Apocalypse	$23,036,273		
38	September 19, 2004	Sky Captain and the World of Tomorrow	$15,580,278		
39	September 26, 2004	The Forgotten	$21,022,111		
40	October 3, 2004	Shark Tale	$47,604,606		
41	October 10, 2004	Shark Tale	$31,330,299		
42	October 17, 2004	Shark Tale	$22,005,952		
43	October 24, 2004	The Grudge	$39,128,715	The Grudge broke Freddy vs. Jason's record ($36.4 million) for the highest weekend debut for a horror film.	
44	October 31, 2004	The Grudge	$21,817,598		
45	November 7, 2004	The Incredibles	$70,467,423	The Incredibles broke Finding Nemo's record ($70.3 million) for the highest weekend debut for a non-sequel animated film, as well as for an original film overall.	
46	November 14, 2004	The Incredibles	$50,251,359		
47	November 21, 2004	National Treasure	$35,142,554		
48	November 28, 2004	National Treasure	$32,156,917		
49	December 5, 2004	National Treasure	$17,004,967		
50	December 12, 2004	Ocean's Twelve	$39,153,380		
51	December 19, 2004	Lemony Snicket's A Series of Unfortunate Events	$30,061,756		
52	December 26, 2004	Meet the Fockers	$46,120,980	Meet the Fockers' $19.5 million gross on Christmas Day broke The Lord of the Rings: The Return of the King's record ($13.9 million) for the highest grossing Christmas Day of all time.	
53	January 2, 2005	Meet the Fockers	$41,741,785		

== Highest-grossing films ==
=== Calendar Gross ===
Highest-grossing films of 2004 by Calendar Gross

Rank	Title	Studio(s)	Actor(s)	Director(s)	Gross
1.	Shrek 2	DreamWorks Animation	voices of Mike Myers, Eddie Murphy, Cameron Diaz, Julie Andrews, Antonio Banderas, John Cleese, Rupert Everett and Jennifer Saunders	Andrew Adamson, Kelly Asbury and Conrad Vernon	$441,226,247
2.	Spider-Man 2	Columbia Pictures	Tobey Maguire, Kirsten Dunst, James Franco, Alfred Molina, Rosemary Harris and Donna Murphy	Sam Raimi	$373,585,825
3.	The Passion of the Christ	Newmarket Films	Jim Caviezel, Monica Bellucci, Maia Morgenstern and Sergio Rubini	Mel Gibson	$370,274,604
4.	Harry Potter and the Prisoner of Azkaban	Warner Bros. Pictures	Daniel Radcliffe, Rupert Grint, Emma Watson, Robbie Coltrane, Michael Gambon, Richard Griffiths, Gary Oldman, Alan Rickman, Fiona Shaw, Maggie Smith, Timothy Spall, David Thewlis, Emma Thompson and Julie Walters	Alfonso Cuarón	$249,541,069
5.	The Incredibles	Walt Disney Pictures	voices of Craig T. Nelson, Holly Hunter, Sarah Vowell, Spencer Fox, Jason Lee, Samuel L. Jackson and Elizabeth Peña	Brad Bird	$248,939,765
6.	The Day After Tomorrow	20th Century Fox	Dennis Quaid, Jake Gyllenhaal, Ian Holm, Emmy Rossum and Sela Ward	Roland Emmerich	$186,740,799
7.	The Bourne Supremacy	Universal Pictures	Matt Damon, Franka Potente, Brian Cox, Julia Stiles, Karl Urban, Gabriel Mann and Joan Allen	Paul Greengrass	$176,241,941
8.	Shark Tale	DreamWorks Animation	voices of Will Smith, Robert De Niro, Renée Zellweger, Angelina Jolie, Jack Black and Martin Scorsese	Vicky Jenson, Bibo Bergeron and Rob Letterman	$160,241,941
9.	The Polar Express	Warner Bros. Pictures	voices of Tom Hanks, Daryl Sabara, Nona Gaye, Jimmy Bennett and Eddie Deezen	Robert Zemeckis	$151,621,905
10.	National Treasure	Walt Disney Pictures	Nicolas Cage, Harvey Keitel, Jon Voight, Diane Kruger, Sean Bean, Justin Bartha and Christopher Plummer	Jon Turteltaub	$150,121,985

=== In-Year Release ===
Highest-grossing films of 2004 by In-year release
Rank	Title	Studio	Domestic Gross
1.	Shrek 2	DreamWorks	$441,226,247
2.	Spider-Man 2	Sony	$373,585,825
3.	The Passion of the Christ	Icon/Newmarket	$370,782,930
4.	Meet the Fockers	Universal	$279,261,160
5.	The Incredibles	Disney	$261,441,092
6.	Harry Potter and the Prisoner of Azkaban	Warner Bros.	$249,541,069
7.	The Day After Tomorrow	20th Century Fox/Lionsgate	$186,740,799
8.	The Polar Express	Warner Bros.	$183,373,735
9.	The Bourne Supremacy	Universal	$176,241,941
10.	National Treasure	Disney	$173,008,894

Highest-grossing films by MPAA rating of 2004
G	The Polar Express
PG	Shrek 2
PG-13	Spider-Man 2
R	The Passion of the Christ

== See also ==
- List of American films — American films by year
- List of box office number-one films

== Chronology ==
Preceded by 2003	2004	Succeeded by 2005
