= Duane Adler =

American screenwriter and film director

- Born: 1968 or 1969 (age 57–58); North Carolina
- Occupations: Screenwriter, film director
- Years active: 2001–present

Duane Adler (born 1968 or 1969) is an American screenwriter and film director best known for writing numerous dance films, including Save the Last Dance (2001) and Step Up (2006). The films grossed over $250 million each, which BroadwayWorld noted as being in the top ten all-time box office for dance films. The Baltimore Sun reported in 2014, "Adler established himself as one of the go-to screenwriters for 21st-century dance movies."

Step Up became a franchise, and sequel films based on his characters grossed over $651 million worldwide. Adler's directorial debut was the 2006 film God's Waiting List, written by Blaze Lovejoy. Adler's first film as writer-director was the 2013 film Make Your Move.

== Background ==
Duane Adler was born in the US state of North Carolina around 1968 or 1969. He grew up in the suburbs of Washington, DC and in Odenton, Maryland. He went to college at the University of Maryland, College Park.

== Career ==
Duane Adler wrote the original screenplay for the 2001 film Save the Last Dance. Paramount Pictures hired Cheryl Edwards to rewrite the screenplay, and she worked on it in the course of nine months. Paramount tentatively gave both writers their first screenplay credits, and Adler requested arbitration to claim sole screenplay credit based on his primary contribution. The first arbitration case was inconclusive due to a factual error, and a second arbitration case led to Adler receiving story credit, with both Adler and Edwards receiving screenplay credit.

Adler also wrote the film's 2006 sequel Save the Last Dance 2 and co-wrote the 2006 film Step Up with Melissa Rosenberg. In 2008, he began writing Venice Beach, a "music-driven romance" starring singer Ne-Yo, who had appeared in Save the Last Dance 2. The film did not reach production. In 2009, Adler was hired to rewrite a script for the teen dance drama Jump Around, which revolved around a team in a Double Dutch jump rope competition with the intent to direct, though the film was never produced.

Adler's first effort as writer-director came with the 2013 film Make Your Move, which he had tried to make for over seven years. He initially sought to work with Savion Glover to make a film revolving around tap dance, but his pitch did not achieve results. He had another idea of a collaboration between an American boy and an Asian girl who were both musicians, and he sought to merge that with tap dance. After some difficulty, he was inspired by a New York-based Japanese trope named COBU that used taiko drums. Film producer Robert W. Cort supported Adler's project, and Adler wrote and directed Make Your Move.

Adler then directed the 2017 film Heartbeats, which featured an American family going to a wedding in India and shows both American and Indian styles of dancing. Following Heartbeats, the television network Fox committed to the script of Shine, a television film that involved Adler as writer and executive producer. The film was not produced. In 2019, Adler and the studio Entertainment One received a pilot commitment from the TV network ABC to produce House of the Rising Sun, featuring two feuding families with the backdrop being a New Orleans nightclub. He also developed a multi-generational dance series for Fox.

Adler wrote Talent Show, about an unsuccessful songwriter who goes back to Chicago to guide a group of vulnerable young people in their yearly talent show. By 2019, Lena Waithe wrote a new version of the script, which started development under Gandja Monteiro. The film did not advance past the development stage. By 2021, Adler also wrote Good Vibes for New Line Cinema.

== Credits ==
Adler's credits
Year	Film	Notes	Ref.
2001	Save the Last Dance	Story credit; screenplay credit shared with Cheryl Edwards	
2001	The Way She Moves	Wrote screenplay; also known as When the Music Stops	
2006	Step Up	Wrote story; wrote screenplay with Melissa Rosenberg	
2006	Save the Last Dance 2	Wrote screenplay	
2006	God's Waiting List	Directed; written by Blaze Lovejoy	
2008	Step Up 2: The Streets	Based on characters by Duane Adler	
2008	Make It Happen	Wrote story; wrote screenplay with Nicole Avril; also co-producer	
2010	Step Up 3D	Based on characters by Duane Adler	
2012	Step Up Revolution	Based on characters by Duane Adler	
2013	Make Your Move	Wrote and directed	
2014	Step Up: All In	Based on characters by Duane Adler	
2017	Heartbeats	Wrote and directed	
