= Crashing (film) =

- Directed by: Gary Walkow
- Written by: Gary Walkow
- Story by: Gary Walkow
- Produced by: Gary Walkow; Alain Silver
- Starring: Campbell Scott; Lizzy Caplan; Izabella Miko; Alex Kingston
- Cinematography: Andrew Huebscher
- Edited by: Steve Vance
- Music by: Ernest Troost
- Production companies: Existential Films; Pendragon Film
- Release date: April 11, 2007 (Gen Art)
- Running time: 80 minutes
- Country: United States
- Language: English

Crashing is a 2007 American drama film directed by Gary Walkow and starring Campbell Scott, Lizzy Caplan, Izabella Miko and Alex Kingston. It is a follow-up to Walkow's 1987 film The Trouble with Dick. The Russo brothers served as executive producers of the film.

== Cast ==
- Campbell Scott as Richard McMurray
- Lizzy Caplan as Jacqueline
- Izabella Miko as Kristin
- Alex Kingston as Diane Freed
- David Cross as Space Station Man
- Stephen Gyllenhaal as Writer

== Release ==
The film premiered at the Gen Art Film Festival on April 11, 2007.

== Reception ==
Todd McCarthy of Variety gave the film a positive review and wrote, "...insidiously engaging low-budgeter employs a literate sensibility, breezy tone and warm performances..."
