= List of 2003 box office number-one films in the United States =

This is a list of films which have placed number one at the weekend box office in the United States during 2003.

== Number-one films ==
†	This implies the highest-grossing movie of the year.

#	Weekend end date	Film	Box office	Notes	Ref
1	January 5, 2003	The Lord of the Rings: The Two Towers	$25,017,279		
2	January 12, 2003	Just Married	$17,548,993		
3	January 19, 2003	Kangaroo Jack	$16,580,209		
4	January 26, 2003	Darkness Falls	$12,024,917		
5	February 2, 2003	The Recruit	$16,302,063		
6	February 9, 2003	How to Lose a Guy in 10 Days	$23,774,850		
7	February 16, 2003	Daredevil	$40,310,419	Daredevil broke John Q.'s record ($20.3 mil) for the highest President's Day weekend debut, and Hannibal's record ($29.7 mil) for the highest President's Day weekend gross.	
8	February 23, 2003	Daredevil	$18,092,309		
9	March 2, 2003	Cradle 2 the Grave	$16,521,468		
10	March 9, 2003	Bringing Down the House	$31,101,026		
11	March 16, 2003	Bringing Down the House	$22,054,934		
12	March 23, 2003	Bringing Down the House	$16,204,468		
13	March 30, 2003	Head of State	$13,503,484		
14	April 6, 2003	Phone Booth	$15,021,088		
15	April 13, 2003	Anger Management	$42,220,847	Anger Management broke The Scorpion King's record ($36.1 mil) for the highest weekend debut in April.	
16	April 20, 2003	Anger Management	$25,005,588		
17	April 27, 2003	Identity	$16,225,263		
18	May 4, 2003	X2	$85,558,731		
19	May 11, 2003	X2	$40,032,160		
20	May 18, 2003	The Matrix Reloaded	$91,774,413	The Matrix Reloaded's $37.5 million opening day gross broke Star Wars: Episode II – Attack of the Clones' record ($30.1 mil) for the highest-grossing Thursday of all-time. It also broke Hannibal's record ($58.0 mil) for the highest weekend debut for an R-rated film and Harry Potter and the Sorcerer's Stone's record ($90.2 mill) for the highest opening for a Warner Bros. film. The Matrix Reloaded had the highest weekend debut of 2003.	
21	May 25, 2003	Bruce Almighty	$67,953,330		
22	June 1, 2003	Finding Nemo †	$70,251,710	Finding Nemo broke Monsters, Inc.'s records ($62.6 mil) for the highest weekend debut for an animated film, a non-sequel animated film, a G-rated film, as well as for an original film overall.	
23	June 8, 2003	2 Fast 2 Furious	$50,472,480		
24	June 15, 2003	Finding Nemo †	$28,384,483	Finding Nemo reclaimed #1 in its third weekend of release.	
25	June 22, 2003	Hulk	$62,128,420	Hulk broke Austin Powers: The Spy Who Shagged Me's record ($54.9 mil) for the highest weekend debut in June.	
26	June 29, 2003	Charlie's Angels: Full Throttle	$37,634,221		
27	July 6, 2003	Terminator 3: Rise of the Machines	$44,041,440		
28	July 13, 2003	Pirates of the Caribbean: The Curse of the Black Pearl	$46,630,690		
29	July 20, 2003	Bad Boys II	$46,522,560		
30	July 27, 2003	Spy Kids 3-D: Game Over	$33,417,739	Spy Kids 3-D: Game Over broke Jaws 3-D's record ($13.3 mil) for the highest weekend debut for a 3-D film.	
31	August 3, 2003	American Wedding	$33,369,440		
32	August 10, 2003	S.W.A.T.	$37,062,535		
33	August 17, 2003	Freddy vs. Jason	$36,428,066	Freddy vs. Jason broke Scream 3's record ($34.7 million) for the highest weekend debut for a slasher film.	
34	August 24, 2003	Freddy vs. Jason	$13,152,967		
35	August 31, 2003	Jeepers Creepers 2	$15,269,324	Jeepers Creepers 2 broke Jeepers Creepers' record ($13.1 mil) for the highest Labor Day weekend debut.	
36	September 7, 2003	Dickie Roberts: Former Child Star	$6,660,540		
37	September 14, 2003	Once Upon a Time in Mexico	$23,424,118		
38	September 21, 2003	Underworld	$21,753,759		
39	September 28, 2003	The Rundown	$18,553,765		
40	October 5, 2003	School of Rock	$19,622,714		
41	October 12, 2003	Kill Bill: Volume 1	$22,089,322		
42	October 19, 2003	The Texas Chainsaw Massacre	$28,094,014		
43	October 26, 2003	Scary Movie 3	$48,113,770	Scary Movie 3 broke Red Dragon's record ($36.5 mil) for the highest weekend debut in October as well as for any fall release, and broke Lara Croft: Tomb Raider's record ($47.7 million) for highest weekend debut for a film featuring a female protagonist.	
44	November 2, 2003	Scary Movie 3	$20,017,468		
45	November 9, 2003	The Matrix Revolutions	$48,475,154		
46	November 16, 2003	Elf	$26,325,613	Elf reached #1 in its second weekend of release.	
47	November 23, 2003	The Cat in the Hat	$38,329,160		
48	November 30, 2003	The Cat in the Hat	$24,459,685		
49	December 7, 2003	The Last Samurai	$24,271,354		
50	December 14, 2003	Something's Gotta Give	$16,064,723		
51	December 21, 2003	The Lord of the Rings: The Return of the King	$72,629,713	The Lord of the Rings: The Return of the King's $34.4 million opening day gross broke Star Wars: Episode I – The Phantom Menace's record ($28.5 mil) for the highest Wednesday gross of all-time. It also broke The Lord of the Rings: The Two Towers' record ($62.0 mil) for the highest weekend debut in December.	
52	December 28, 2003	The Lord of the Rings: The Return of the King	$50,598,104		

== Highest-grossing films ==
=== Calendar Gross ===
Highest-grossing films of 2003 by Calendar Gross

Rank	Title	Studio(s)	Actor(s)	Director(s)	Gross
1.	Finding Nemo	Walt Disney Studios	voices of Albert Brooks, Ellen DeGeneres, Alexander Gould, Willem Dafoe and Geoffrey Rush	Andrew Stanton	$339,714,184
2.	Pirates of the Caribbean: The Curse of the Black Pearl	Walt Disney Studios	Johnny Depp, Geoffrey Rush, Orlando Bloom, Keira Knightley and Jonathan Pryce	Gore Verbinski	$305,398,779
3.	The Matrix Reloaded	Warner Bros. Pictures	Keanu Reeves, Laurence Fishburne, Carrie-Anne Moss, Hugo Weaving, Jada Pinkett Smith and Gloria Foster	The Wachowskis	$281,576,461
4.	The Lord of the Rings: The Return of the King	New Line Cinema	Elijah Wood, Ian McKellen, Liv Tyler, Viggo Mortensen, Sean Astin, Cate Blanchett, John Rhys-Davies, Bernard Hill, Billy Boyd, Dominic Monaghan, Orlando Bloom, Hugo Weaving, Miranda Otto, David Wenham, Karl Urban, John Noble, Andy Serkis, Ian Holm and Sean Bean	Peter Jackson	$249,445,927
5.	Bruce Almighty	Universal Pictures	Jim Carrey, Morgan Freeman, Jennifer Aniston and Philip Baker Hall	Tom Shadyac	$242,829,261
6.	X2	20th Century Fox	Patrick Stewart, Hugh Jackman, Ian McKellen, Halle Berry, Famke Janssen, James Marsden, Anna Paquin, Rebecca Romijn, Brian Cox, Alan Cumming, Shawn Ashmore, Kelly Hu, Aaron Stanford and Bruce Davison	Bryan Singer	$214,949,694
7.	Elf	New Line Cinema	Will Ferrell, James Caan, Zooey Deschanel, Mary Steenburgen, Edward Asner and Bob Newhart	Jon Favreau	$167,547,000
8.	Chicago	Miramax Films	Renée Zellweger, Catherine Zeta-Jones, Richard Gere, Queen Latifah, John C. Reilly, Lucy Liu, Taye Diggs, Colm Feore and Dominic West	Rob Marshall	$167,511,932
9.	Terminator 3: Rise of the Machines	Warner Bros. Pictures	Arnold Schwarzenegger, Nick Stahl, Claire Danes and Kristanna Loken	Jonathan Mostow	$150,371,112
10.	Bad Boys II	Columbia Pictures	Martin Lawrence, Will Smith, Jordi Mollà, Gabrielle Union, Peter Stormare, Theresa Randle and Joe Pantoliano	Michael Bay	$138,608,444

=== In-Year Release ===
Highest-grossing films of 2003 by In-year release
Rank	Title	Distributor	Domestic gross
1.	The Lord of the Rings: The Return of the King	New Line Cinema	$377,027,325
2.	Finding Nemo	Disney	$339,714,978
3.	Pirates of the Caribbean: The Curse of the Black Pearl	Disney	$305,413,918
4.	The Matrix Reloaded	Warner Bros.	$281,576,461
5.	Bruce Almighty	Universal	$242,829,261
6.	X2	20th Century Fox	$214,949,694
7.	Elf	New Line Cinema	$173,398,518
8.	Terminator 3: Rise of the Machines	Warner Bros.	$150,371,112
9.	The Matrix Revolutions	Warner Bros.	$139,313,948
10.	Cheaper by the Dozen	20th Century Fox	$138,614,544

Highest-grossing films by MPAA rating of 2003
G	Finding Nemo
PG	Elf
PG-13	The Lord of the Rings: The Return of the King
R	The Matrix Reloaded

== See also ==
- List of American films — American films by year
- Lists of box office number-one films

== Chronology ==
Preceded by 2002	2003	Succeeded by 2004
