= Izabella Miko =

Polish actress, dancer, producer, and environmental activist (born 1981)

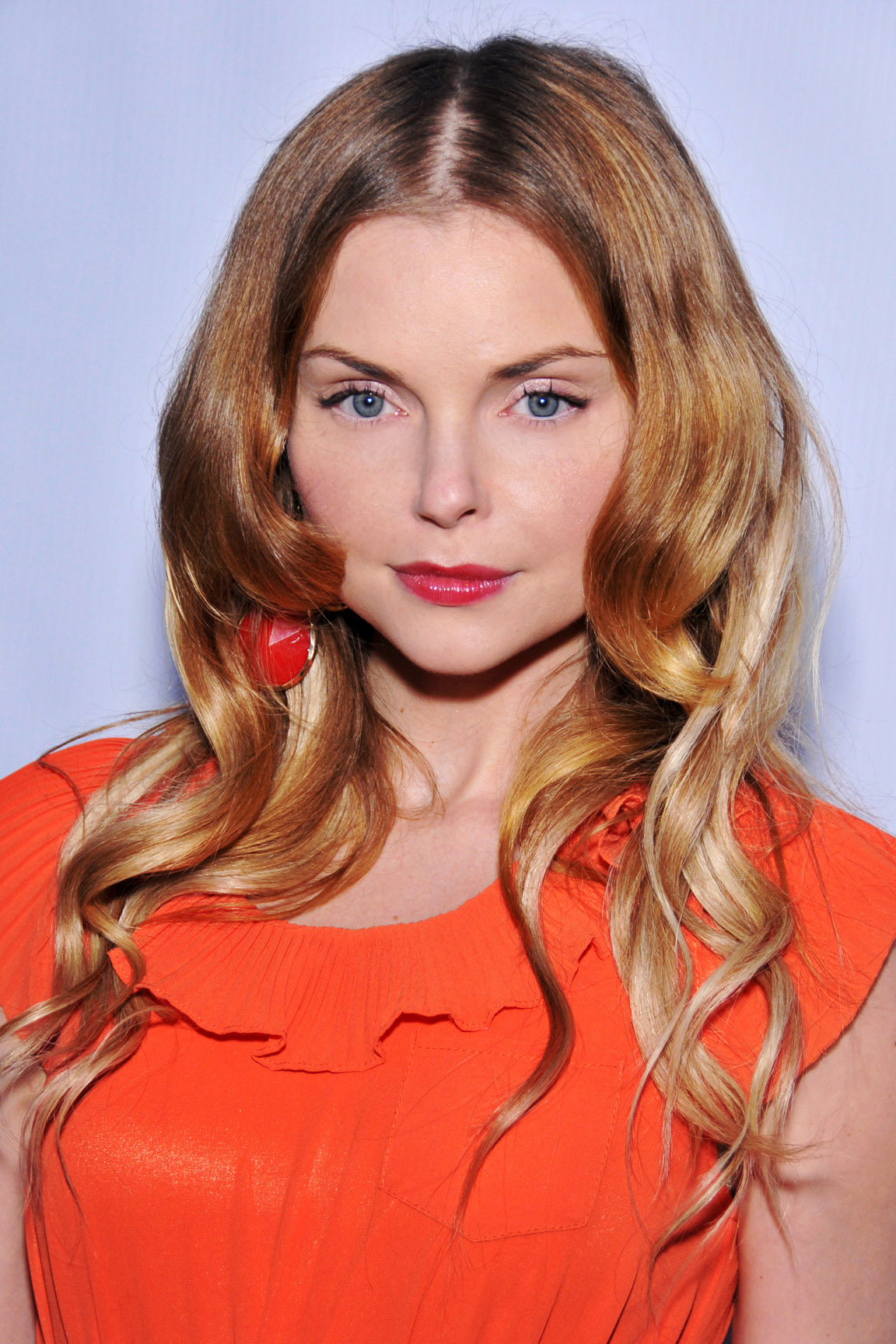
- Izabella Miko in 2013
- Born: Izabella Anna Mikołajczak; 21 January 1981 (age 45); Łódź, Poland
- Other names: Izabella Mikolajczak; Izabela Mikolajczyk; Iza Miko
- Occupations: Actress, dancer, producer
- Years active: 1988–present
- Height: 5 ft 5 in (165 cm)

Izabella Miko (born Izabella Anna Mikołajczak; 21 January 1981) is a Polish actress, dancer, film producer, and environmental activist. She is best known for starring in the film Coyote Ugly and the music videos "Mr. Brightside" and "Miss Atomic Bomb" by The Killers. While a dance student in Poland, Miko was recruited to study at the New York City Ballet at age 15 and later studied acting at the Lee Strasberg Institute. She made her American film debut in Coyote Ugly (2000), followed by a starring part in the vampire thriller The Forsaken (2001).

Miko has also had recurring roles on the television series Deadwood, The Cape, and Chicago Fire, in addition to roles in dance films such as Save the Last Dance 2 (2006), Make Your Move (2013), and Step Up: All In (2014). She made her debut as a film producer on the British biographical drama Desert Dancer in 2014. She is also known as an environmental activist. She has a sustainable candle line named EkoMiko Candles as well as an eco foundation named EkoMiko.

== Early life ==
Miko was born Izabella Anna Mikołajczak in Łódź, Poland, the daughter of actors Grażyna Dyląg and Aleksander Mikołajczak. She grew up in Warsaw, where she studied to be a ballerina at the Chopin Music School. An American choreographer invited her to study in New York City on a scholarship with the School of American Ballet, and she later enrolled at the Lee Strasberg Institute to study acting. She later recalled this experience by saying: "I came from Poland to America to study ballet in New York. I got a scholarship when I was 15 and ended up in New York by myself. No money, no English, no parents. So it was very tough. Those three years were really, really hard, but they were worth it." After sustaining knee and ankle injuries, Miko briefly left New York City and returned to Poland.

== Career ==
At the age of 18, Miko returned to the United States and landed her first major film role as Cammie in Coyote Ugly (2000). Coyote Ugly was a box office success, grossing over $113 million worldwide, and became a cult classic over the years. Her character Cammie works as a bartender at Coyote Ugly and becomes friends with a new employee Violet, played by Piper Perabo. In 2024, Miko told LATV: "Coyote Ugly changed my life completely. I was so hungry, I used to go to meetings just to get food and I had crazy little jobs."

This was followed with a lead role in the 2001 vampire horror film The Forsaken, playing a young woman infected by a vampiric virus. In 2005, Miko appeared in a multi-episode story arc on the HBO series Deadwood; the same year, she appeared in the music video for "Mr. Brightside" by The Killers (she again collaborated with the band for the video of their 2012 single "Miss Atomic Bomb"). Miko portrayed a circus trapeze artist, Alice in the drama film Bye Bye Blackbird (2005), where she combined her background as a dancer with new skills in trapeze and tightrope walking. She was nominated for Best Young Character Actress at the 2008 Undine Awards for her role in Bye Bye Blackbird. She had a lead role as Sara Johnson in the dance film Save the Last Dance 2 (2006), replacing Julia Stiles from the original film.

Miko appeared in several independent films in the late 2000s, including Park (2007) and the comedy Flakes (2007), the latter of which premiered at the South by Southwest Film Festival. The following year, she appeared as a seductive nightclub singer in Dark Streets (2008), an adaptation of the play of the same name by Glenn M. Stewart. She also appeared in the crime thriller Double Identity (2009) in a lead role and in the big-budget remake Clash of the Titans (2010) as Athena. She was also in a supporting role as an acrobat named Raia in the television series The Cape, followed by a supporting role as a spy in the British war thriller Age of Heroes, based on the formation of Ian Fleming's No. 30 Commando during World War II. In 2011, she guest starred as Lena on an episode of Law & Order: Special Victims Unit called "Russian Brides." She was an executive producer of the film Yellow (2012) starring Sienna Miller and Riley Keough. She also choreographed a scene for the film.

In 2012, Miko appeared opposite Danny Huston and Sienna Miller in the period drama Two Jacks, directed by Bernard Rose, and in the South Korean dance film Make Your Move in 2013. Miko appeared in Billy Idol's music video for "Can't Break Me Down", and also had a supporting role in Step Up: All In, both in 2014. Also in 2014, she had a small role in the fantasy television series Supernatural, episode "Ask Jeeves" of season 10, where she portrays a shape shifter working for a rich heiress who has died. In 2015, Miko co-produced the biographical film Desert Dancer, which tells the story of Iranian choreographer Afshin Ghaffarian. The same year, she had guest appearances on the television series Blue Bloods and Scorpion as well as a recurring role on the action-drama series Chicago Fire.

== Personal life ==
Miko supports green politics and keeps a video blog titled "Eko Miko". She has supported Global Green USA, an environmentalist group and organization that constitutes the American branch of Green Cross International.

She is vegan. Miko is multilingual and speaks English, French and Polish.

== Filmography ==
=== Film ===
Year	Title	Role	Notes
1988	Pan Kleks w Kosmosie	The Girl with the Matches	
1991	Niech żyje miłość	Kuba's Daughter	
2000	Coyote Ugly	Cammie	
2001	The Forsaken	Megan	
2002	Minimal Knowledge	Renee	
2005	Bye Bye Blackbird	Alice	
2006	Park	Krysta	
2006	The House of Usher	Jill Michaelson	
2006	Save the Last Dance 2	Sara Johnson	Video
2006	The Shore	Kaliope	
2007	Crashing	Kristen	
2007	Flakes	Strawberry	
2007	Waiting	Young Woman	Short
2008	Dark Streets	Madelaine	
2009	Love and Dance	Hania	
2009	Double Identity	Katrine	
2010	Clash of the Titans	Athena	
2010	Repo	Timmy	
2011	Age of Heroes	Jensen	
2012	Two Jacks	Dana	
2013	Make Your Move	Tatianna	
2014	Starving in Suburbia	ButterflyAna	
2014	Step Up: All In	Alexxa Brava	
2014	The Mundane Goddess	Aphrodite	Short
2015	The Frontier	Gloria	
2018	Planeta Singli 2	Singer Beata	
2018	The Rake	Cassie	
2019	Futro z misia	'Futro'	
2024	Sensitive Men	Jenn	Short

=== Television ===
Year	Title	Role	Notes
1993	Kuchnia polska	Zuzia Szymanko	Main Cast
2005	Deadwood	Carrie	Recurring Cast: Season 2
2011	The Cape	Raia	Recurring Cast
2011	Chaos	Greta	Episode: "Deep Cover Band"
2011	Love Bites	Audrey	Episode: "Boys to Men"
2011	Law & Order: Special Victims Unit	Lena	Episode: "Russian Brides"
2014	Supernatural	Olivia	Episode: "Ask Jeeves"
2014	Anger Management	Mary Kathleen	Episode: "Charlie Gets Tied Up with a Catholic Girl"
2015	Blue Bloods	Milena	Episode: "Payback"
2015	Scorpion	Sonia Balasevic	Episode: "Cuba Libre"
2015	Chicago Fire	Katya	Recurring Cast: Season 3, Guest: Season 4
2016	Shooter	Karlina Ordenko	Episode: "Danger Close"
2016	Azja Express	Herself/Contestant	Contestant: Season 1
2017	The Mick	Yulia	Episode: "The Wolf"
2017–18	Twoja twarz brzmi znajomo	Various Roles	Guest: Season 8, Main Cast: Season 9
2018	SNL Polska	Herself/Host	Episode: "Episode #1.14"
2018	Criminal Minds	Galina Kadlec	Episode: "Rule 34"
2020	Hunters	Helen Hirsh	Episode: "In the Belly of the Whale"
2020	NCIS: Los Angeles	Michelle Boucher	Episode: "Raising the Dead"
2022	The Flight Attendant	Cherri	Episode: "Drowning Women"
2022	NCIS: Hawaiʻi	Alina Nikitin	Episode: "Ohana"

=== Music videos ===
Year	Title	Artist	Role
2000	”Can't Fight the Moonlight”	Leann Rimes	Dancer
2005	”Mr. Brightside”	The Killers	Woman
2011	”First MILF”	Mother Nature	Mother Nature
2012	”Miss Atomic Bomb”	The Killers	Young Girl
2014	”Can't Break Me Down”	Billy Idol	Herself

=== Other credits ===
List of films directed, produced and written by
Year	Title	Role	Notes
2011	Got a Teeny Weeny?	Producer, director and writer	Short film
2012	Yellow	Executive producer	
2014	Desert Dancer	Producer	
2018	Sensitive Men	Executive producer	Short film
2018	Straight Talk Express	Producer	Short film
