= Save the Last Dance =

2001 film by Thomas Carter

- Theatrical release poster
- Directed by: Thomas Carter
- Screenplay by: Duane Adler; Cheryl Edwards
- Story by: Duane Adler
- Produced by: Robert W. Cort; David Madden
- Starring: Julia Stiles; Sean Patrick Thomas; Kerry Washington; Terry Kinney; Fredro Starr
- Cinematography: Robbie Greenberg
- Edited by: Peter Berger; Jeff Canavan; Fritz Feick
- Music by: Mark Isham
- Production companies: MTV Films; Cort/Madden Productions
- Distributed by: Paramount Pictures
- Release date: January 12, 2001
- Running time: 113 minutes
- Country: United States
- Language: English
- Budget: $13 million
- Box office: $131.5 million

Save the Last Dance is a 2001 American dance film, directed by Thomas Carter. It stars Julia Stiles and Sean Patrick Thomas as a teenage interracial couple in Chicago who work together to help Stiles' character train for a Juilliard School dance audition. It was produced by MTV Films.

Save the Last Dance was released in the United States on January 12, 2001, by Paramount Pictures. It received mixed reviews from critics, and grossed $131.5 million on a $13 million budget. A direct-to-video sequel, Save the Last Dance 2, was released in 2006.

== Plot ==
Seventeen-year-old Sara Johnson, an aspiring ballet dancer in suburban Chicago, auditions for the Juilliard School after asking her mother to attend. Sara performs poorly and is rejected. Soon afterward, she learns that her mother was killed in a car accident while traveling to the audition. Blaming herself, Sara abandons ballet and moves to Chicago's South Side to live with her estranged father, Roy, a jazz trumpeter. Roy initially struggles to communicate with Sara, but they gradually begin rebuilding their relationship.

Sara transfers to a majority-Black high school, where she befriends Chenille Reynolds, a teenage single mother. Chenille takes her to a nightclub called Stepps and introduces her to her brother Derek, an ambitious student who hopes to attend Georgetown University and become a pediatrician. After seeing Sara struggle with hip-hop dancing, Derek offers to teach her. The two begin practicing together, combining elements of ballet and hip hop.

Derek takes Sara to see the Joffrey Ballet, prompting her to discuss her mother's death and her abandoned ambitions. Their friendship develops into a romantic relationship. At Stepps, however, a jealous Nikki interrupts them, making Sara retreat to the bar. Malakai, Derek's longtime friend, insults Sara by saying that there's no point on trying to be with him. Derek reassures Sara that he is no longer involved with Nikki as Sara accepts his apology. After learning that he has been accepted into Georgetown, he encourages Sara to audition for Juilliard again.

Tensions intensify at school when Nikki picks a fight with Sara. At the clinic, Chenille tells Sara that while she disapproves Nikki's behavior, she understands her resentment of a white girl "stealing" Derek, who is rare in the community. Deeply hurt by Chenille's words and the backlash becoming too much for her to handle, Sara breaks up with Derek.

Meanwhile, Malakai asks Derek to participate in a drive-by shooting scheduled for the night of Sara's audition, and Derek initially agrees. Roy encourages Sara to stop blaming herself for her mother's death and pursue ballet again. Chenille, regretting what she said earlier, confess to Derek that her own frustration with Kenny, the absent father of her child, made her unfairly resentful and envious of his relationship with Sara. She urges Derek to reconcile with Sara and warns that helping Malakai could jeopardize his future. Derek turns on Malakai and refuses to take part in the shooting.

Sara begins her Juilliard audition but becomes unsettled after making a mistake. Derek arrives and encourages her to continue. She completes a routine combining ballet and hip hop and is accepted into the school. The drive-by shooting fails and Malakai is arrested. Sara and Derek reconcile, and the film ends with them joining Chenille and their friends at Stepps to celebrate Sara's acceptance.

== Cast ==
- Julia Stiles as Sara Johnson
- Sean Patrick Thomas as Derek
- Terry Kinney as Roy
- Fredro Starr as Malakai
- Bianca Lawson as Nikki
- Kerry Washington as Chenille
- Vince Green as Snookie
- Garland Whitt as Kenny

== Production ==
Julia Stiles landed the role of Sara after director Thomas Carter saw her dance scene in the 1999 film 10 Things I Hate About You. Lacking dance experience, Stiles prepared for her role by two months of intensive training for the ballet scenes and also rehearsing the choreography for the hip hop scenes. Fatima Robinson was the film's hip hop choreographer.

Lemont High School in Lemont, IL was used as the filming location for Sara's suburban high school. Other locations around Lemont were also used.

== Release ==
The film debuted at number 1 at the North American box office, making $27.5 million in its opening weekend. Though the film had a 44% decline in earnings the following weekend, it still held the top spot for another week. It grossed $91,057,006 in the US alone and $131.7 million worldwide.

== Reception ==
On Rotten Tomatoes, the film has a 54% approval rating based on 100 reviews, with an average score of 5.5/10 and a consensus: "This teen romance flick feels like a predictable rehashing of other movies." Metacritic, which uses a weighted average, assigned the film a score of 53 out of 100, based on 24 critics, indicating "mixed or average" reviews.

Positive reviews praised the performances of Stiles, Thomas, and Washington. Desson Howe of The Washington Post said that Stiles and Washington were appealing performers and concluded, "Thomas is the movie's best element. He puts so much authority in his performance, he makes this controversial romance seem like the best thing that could happen to anyone. That's no easy task."

In a three-star review, Roger Ebert said that despite the film's clichéd story and romance, "the development is intelligent, the characters are more complicated than we expect, and the ending doesn't tie everything up in a predictable way." Charles Taylor of Salon wrote, "for all its dumb clichés it offers the basic appeal of teen movies: the pleasure of watching kids be kids, acting as they do among themselves instead of how parents and teachers expect them to act."

Writing for the Chicago Tribune, Mark Caro said, "On paper the movie is full of cliches recently explored elsewhere...Yet in this case the outline is not the story; the people who inhabit it are," and in this way, "Save the Last Dance triumphantly passes the audition."

Negative reviews criticized the editing style of dance scenes, the film's "after-school special"-like subplot, and the script for not delving enough into the issues of interracial relationships. Critic Wesley Morris wrote "the movie combines the worst of urbansploitation with the worst of teensploitation, and outfits them both in makings of the ultimate racial-crossover melodrama -- teen motherhood, deadbeat teen dads, drive-bys, a dangerous ex-girlfriend, speeches straight from the pages of Terry McMillan." Lisa Schwarzbaum of Entertainment Weekly wrote, "director Thomas Carter is afraid to pump up the volume on its own interracial, hip hop Romeo and Juliet story, lest it challenge even one sedated viewer or disturb the peace."

== Criticism ==
The dancing in Save the Last Dance was particularly criticized, derided as mediocre at best, and borderline offensive at worst. It was ranked with the poor dancing of similarly themed teen movies from the early 2000s such as Honey, You Got Served and Stomp the Yard. Its characterization of "hip hop dancing" as amounting to 'random fingerpointing and sitting awkwardly in a chair' has spawned viral memes on social media.

Additionally, the plot line suggesting that Sara's subpar audition was enough to earn admission to Juilliard has been mocked as "ludicrous". In a twenty-year retrospective of the movie, Karla Rodriguez of Complex Magazine wrote:

We are sure Stiles worked really hard to learn the choreography for this scene and she deserves to be commended for her efforts—especially since the actress had no previous dance experience prior to the film and still did most of the dancing herself. But let's be honest: If it wasn't part of a movie, there's no way that dance number would have held up in real life and gotten her accepted into one of the most prestigious dance schools in the world. After all, the famous NYC school has an extremely low acceptance rate of 8%, beating out a majority of Ivy League schools. That figure makes the fine arts school harder to get into than Brown, Columbia, Cornell, Dartmouth, Princeton, and the University of Pennsylvania.

During a Weekend Update segment on the December 9, 2023 episode of Saturday Night Live, comedian Chloe Fineman did Stiles's dance from the end of the film with Stiles, who made a surprise cameo on the show.

== Awards and nominations ==
Award	Category	Nominee	Result	Ref.
Black Reel Awards	Theatrical — Best Supporting Actress	Kerry Washington	Nominated	
Golden Reel Awards	Best Sound Editing — Music, Musical Feature Film	Michael T. Ryan	Nominated	
MTV Movie Awards	Best Kiss	Julia Stiles and Sean Patrick Thomas	Won	
MTV Movie Awards	Best Dance Sequence	Julia Stiles and Sean Patrick Thomas	Nominated	
MTV Movie Awards	Best Female Performance	Julia Stiles	Nominated	
MTV Movie Awards	Breakthrough Male Performance	Sean Patrick Thomas	Won	
Teen Choice Awards	Choice Movie: Actress	Julia Stiles	Won	
Teen Choice Awards	Choice Movie: Breakout Star	Kerry Washington	Won	
Teen Choice Awards	Choice Movie: Fight Scene	Julia Stiles and Bianca Lawson	Won	
Teen Choice Awards	Choice Movie: Drama		Nominated	
Young Hollywood Awards	Standout Performance — Male	Sean Patrick Thomas	Won	

=== Home media ===
The film was released on DVD and VHS on June 19, 2001. It was re-released on DVD on January 24, 2017.

== Sequel ==
A sequel to the film, titled Save the Last Dance 2, was released direct-to-video on October 10, 2006.

== See also ==
- Dirty Dancing, a 1987 film which starred Patrick Swayze, a performer from the Joffrey Ballet
- Step Up, a 2006 film starring Channing Tatum, Jenna Dewan, and Mario
- Dance Flick, a 2009 spoof film which starred Damon Wayans, Jr., and Shoshana Bush
