= Nelson Coates =

American production designer

- Born: Murfreesboro, Tennessee, United States
- Education: Abilene Christian University
- Occupation: Production designer
- Years active: 1989–present
- Notable work: In the Heights, Crazy Rich Asians, Flight, The Proposal, Antwone Fisher
- Office: President, Art Directors Guild and Member, Executive Committee, Academy of Motion Pictures Arts and Sciences Production Designer Branch
- Awards: 2019 Excellence in Production Design Award, Contemporary Film, Art Directors Guild for Crazy Rich Asians

Nelson Coates is an American production designer for feature film and television. His motion picture credits include the Lin-Manuel Miranda musical In the Heights, based on the Tony Award-winning Broadway show; Jon M. Chu's romantic comedy Crazy Rich Asians, the highest-grossing romantic comedy of the last decade; Robert Zemeckis' dramatic thriller Flight, which critics Roger Ebert and Owen Gleiberman placed on their top-10 lists; and the biographical drama Antwone Fisher, which received a 2002 American Film Institute Award. Coates' television projects include the mystery drama Home Before Dark and the second and third season of The Morning Show, both for Apple TV+.

Coates is currently serving his second term as President of the Art Directors Guild.

== Early life ==
Born in Murfreesboro, Tennessee, Coates began his lifelong involvement in the performing arts at an early age. He made his professional debut at six, acting, singing and dancing in regional theater. During high school, Coates also competed in gymnastics, developing an understanding of biomechanics, action and physical space that informed his design of Wesley Snipes' escape route in Murder at 1600 and continues to benefit his work today.

Coates attended Abilene Christian University (ACU), graduating magna cum laude with a B.A. in journalism/mass communications and an emphasis in design. While in college, he performed in more than 30 cabarets, musicals and plays and simultaneously began to design for the stage.

== Career ==
After graduating, Coates appeared in off-Broadway and national touring productions while designing sets for several Dallas theater companies. His work for the Dallas Theater Center led to his first assignment designing for television, for the PBS series Gerbert.

In 1990, Coates relocated from Texas to Los Angeles, where he built his career designing for movies and television series. He developed collaborative relationships with numerous directors, working with Gary Fleder on Things to Do in Denver When You're Dead, Kiss the Girls and Runaway Jury; Anne Fletcher on The Guilt Trip, The Proposal and Hot Pursuit; Mimi Leder on Thick as Thieves, John Doe and On the Basis of Sex; and Jon M. Chu on Crazy Rich Asians, Home Before Dark and In the Heights. Coates also designed Anjelica Huston's debut as a feature film director on Bastard Out of Carolina, Bill Paxton's on Frailty and Denzel Washington's on Antwone Fisher.

== Entertainment industry recognition ==
Coates was nominated for a 1997 Primetime Emmy Award for Stephen King's The Stand. He designed 225 sets for the four-part miniseries, including a recreation of a Nebraska cornfield on a Utah stage. Coates grew 3,250 cornstalks from seed to dress the set, but when Utah's harshest winter in 100 years stunted the crop's growth, he interspersed close-up worthy replicas.

Coates' second major award nomination was for a 2008 Art Directors Guild Excellence in Production Design Award, Contemporary Film for Flight, about a troubled pilot who crash lands a plane to save its occupants. Director Robert Zemeckis tasked the designer with creating a fictional, but believable airline that included the word "jet" in its name, but that avoided any real-world references.

Zemeckis wanted the passengers, crew and their belongings to react naturally to gravity during the accident. To solve this challenge, Coates built a full-length fuselage using modified, genuine, airline parts and that divided into sections. The fuselage, replete with performers and props, was mounted onto various motion simulation rigs including a "rotisserie rig" that rotated 180 degrees.

In her New York Times review, movie critic Manohla Dargis said, "…the accident in Flight is freakishly real… It's a showstopper."

On Crazy Rich Asians, Coates' directive was to bring Singapore's tastes, traditions, culture and design to the silver screen. For greater authenticity, Coates imbued the characters with Peranakan heritage (it wasn't in the original novel) and tapped its rich art, architecture and design practices for his sets.

Chu wanted the film's climactic marriage ceremony "…to be a wedding like you've never seen before." In the novel, the ceremony costs $40 million, but the project's entire budget was only $30 million. Coates attended more than 35 Chinese and Singaporean weddings as research and designed a set in a former 19th Century convent that Architectural Digest described as a "church of nature." He also developed a system for flooding the chapel that preserved the decorations so that the bride could walk on water down the aisle.

Coates won a 2018 Art Directors Guild Excellence in Production Design Award, Contemporary Film, for his designs for the film.

== Additional movie projects ==
Coates recreated the tundra town of Barrow, Alaska (later renamed Utqiagvik) in the warmer, greener, mountainous Anchorage for the feature film Big Miracle (2012). The remote town was the original setting for the movie's true story about a 1988 whale rescue.

To prepare, Coates watched more than 70 hours of news and documentary footage. He built houses on wagons with varied looks so that the structures could be rearranged overnight to simulate different Barrow streets.

Coates also designed a multi-function water tank that was large enough to stage the underwater action, which included three robotic vehicles maneuvering three animatronic whales. He oversaw the whales' fabrication so that they precisely matched the original animals in appearance and movement (the historical and new footage were intercut).

For Fifty Shades Darker (2017) and Fifty Shades Freed (2018), director James Foley hired Coates to reimagine the franchise's world. The designer added texture and depth to the projects' 160 sets and introduced visual references to reflect the characters' backstories. The films were shot simultaneously over 106 days in 167 locations and required Coates to balance a myriad of details to maintain the visual integrity and continuity of each movie.

== Entertainment industry and arts organizations ==
Coates is serving his second term as President of the Art Directors Guild (ADG). In 2016 he oversaw the formation of ADG's women's and diversity committees to address issues in front of and behind the camera. Coates was also instrumental in creating and organizing the Guild's first new member orientation and first member directory.

Coates is a voting member of the Academy of Television Arts and Sciences (ATAS) and the Academy of Motion Pictures Arts and Sciences (AMPAS), where he also serves on the Executive Committee of the Production Design Branch. He previously served on AMPAS' Foreign Language Film Committee (later renamed the International Feature Film Committee).

== Collegiate support ==
Coates is a member of the Board of Trustees of Laguna College of Art and Design (LCAD), where he has co-chaired fundraising events to support student scholarships.

Coates speaks frequently at universities, including at his alma mater, Abilene Christian University. In 1996, he was named ACU's Outstanding Young Alumnus of the Year and was accorded the University's Department of Journalism and Mass Communication's Gutenberg Award, which recognizes distinguished professional achievements by alumni.

Coates endowed two scholarships at ACU, one in production design and the second in education in honor of his parents.

Coates served as the keynote speaker at UCLA's Design Showcase West.

== Filmography ==
=== Film ===
Year	Project	Awards	Nominations
2022	Hocus Pocus 2		
2020	In the Heights		Excellence in Production Design Award, Contemporary Film, Art Directors Guild
2018	Crazy Rich Asians	Excellence in Production Design Award, Contemporary Film, Art Directors Guild	Best Art Direction, Critics Choice Movie Awards, Broadcast Film Critics Association; Best Production Design, Chicago Independent Film Critics Circle Awards; Best Production Design, OFTA Film Awards, Online Film & Television Association
2018	Fifty Shades Freed		
2018	On the Basis of Sex		
2017	Unforgettable		
2017	Fifty Shades Darker		
2015	Secret in Their Eyes		
2015	Hot Pursuit		
2012	The Guilt Trip		
2012	Flight		Excellence in Production Design Award, Contemporary Film, Art Directors Guild
2012	Big Miracle		
2010	The Last Song		
2009	The Proposal		
2009	Thick as Thieves		
2008	The Express: The Ernie Davis Story		
2006	School for Scoundrels		
2006	Aquamarine		
2005	Man of the House		
2003	Runaway Jury		
2002	Antwone Fisher		
2001	Impostor		
2001	Frailty		
2001	Don't Say a Word		
1999	Stir of Echoes		
1998	Living Out Loud		
1998	Disturbing Behavior		
1997	Kiss the Girls		
1997	Murder at 1600		
1996	Albino Alligator		
1996	Bastard Out of Carolina		
1995	Things to Do in Denver When You're Dead		
1994	Blank Check		
1993	Three of Hearts		
1993	CB4		

=== Television ===
Year	Project	Award Nominations
2022	The Morning Show (seasons 2–3)	
2021	The Morning Show (TV series, two episodes)	Excellence in Production Design Award, One Hour Contemporary Single-Camera Television Series, Art Directors Guild
2020	Home Before Dark (TV series, eight episodes)	
2019	Ken Jeong: You Complete Me, Ho (TV special)	
2012	Friday Night Dinner (TV movie)	
2010	Boston's Finest (TV movie)	
2007	October Road (TV series, six episodes)	
2005	Johnny Zero (TV series, pilot)	
2002	John Doe (TV series, pilot)	
1995	Crazy Love (TV series, pilot)	
1994	The Stand (TV miniseries)	Primetime Emmy, Outstanding Individual Achievement in Art Direction for a Miniseries or a Special
1991	CBS Schoolbreak Special The Emancipation of Lizzie Stern (TV series, one episode)	
1991	Cast a Deadly Spell (TV movie)	
1989	Gerbert (TV series)	
1989	Mother's Day (TV movie)	
1989	For Jenny with Love (TV series)	
