= Mitzi Gaynor =

American actress (1931–2024)

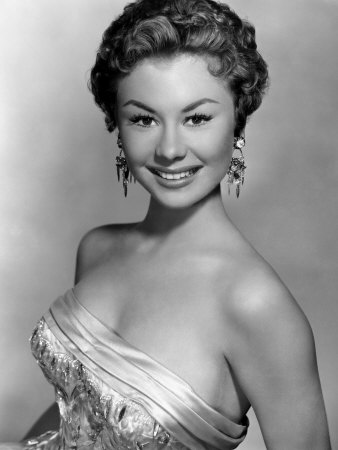
- Gaynor, c. 1954
- Born: Francesca Marlene de Czanyi von Gerber; September 4, 1931; Chicago, Illinois, U.S.
- Died: October 17, 2024 (aged 93); Los Angeles, California, U.S.
- Resting place: Forest Lawn Memorial Park, Glendale, California, U.S.
- Occupations: Actress; dancer; entertainer
- Years active: 1944–2021
- Known for: South Pacific; There's No Business Like Show Business; The Birds and the Bees; We're Not Married!
- Spouse: Jack Bean (m. 1954; died 2006)
- Website: www.missmitzigaynor.com

Francesca Marlene de Czanyi von Gerber (September 4, 1931 – October 17, 2024), known professionally as Mitzi Gaynor, was an American actress, dancer and singer. Her notable films included We're Not Married! (1952), There's No Business Like Show Business (1954), The Birds and the Bees (1956), and South Pacific (1958) – for which she was nominated for the Golden Globe Award for Best Actress – Motion Picture Comedy or Musical at the 1959 awards.

Gaynor was one of the last surviving actresses of the "Golden Age" of the Hollywood musical.

== Early life ==
Mitzi Gaynor was born Francesca Marlene de Czanyi von Gerber in Chicago on September 4, 1931, to Henry de Czanyi von Gerber, a violinist, cellist, and music director of Hungarian descent, and his wife Pauline, a dancer.

By her father's second marriage, she became stepsister to antiwar activist Donald W. Duncan. The family first moved to Elgin, Illinois, then to Detroit, and later, when she was 11, to Hollywood. At age 8, she started training as a ballerina and began her career in the corps de ballet. At 13, she was singing and dancing with the Los Angeles Civic Light Opera company.

== Career ==
=== 20th Century Fox ===
Gaynor signed a seven-year contract with 20th Century Fox at age 17. She sang, acted, and danced in a number of film musicals, often paired with some of the male musical stars of the day. A Fox Studio executive thought Mitzi Gerber sounded like the name of a delicatessen, so they came up with a name that used the same initials.

Gaynor made her film debut in the musical My Blue Heaven (1950); Betty Grable and Dan Dailey starred and she had a supporting role. A college drama Take Care of My Little Girl (1951) followed, with Gaynor playing the roommate of Jeanne Crain.

=== Stardom ===
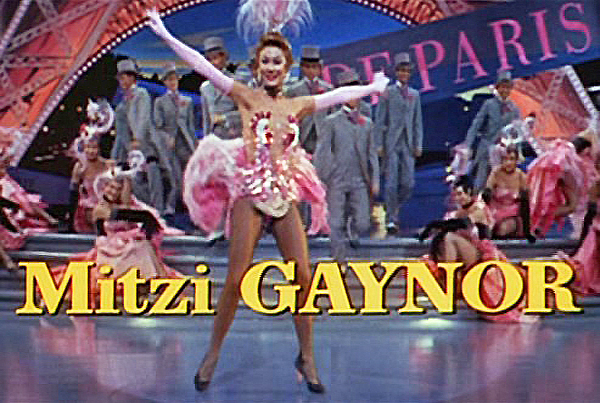
Mitzi Gaynor from the trailer for There's No Business Like Show Business (1954)

Fox then gave Gaynor a star part playing Lotta Crabtree in the musical biopic Golden Girl (1951). It was a modest success at the box office. Gaynor was one of several stars in the 1952 anthology comedy We're Not Married! and was top-billed in the 1952 musical Bloodhounds of Broadway, which made $2 million (equivalent to $24.25 million in 2025).

Fox cast her in The I Don't Care Girl (1952) as Eva Tanguay. The film made $1.25 million. Gaynor starred in Down Among the Sheltering Palms (1953), playing a South Sea island girl. She was the female lead in Three Young Texans (1954). Gaynor's most popular film in her time at Fox was Irving Berlin's There's No Business Like Show Business (1954). She was billed after Ethel Merman, Donald O'Connor, Marilyn Monroe, Dan Dailey, and Johnnie Ray.

=== Jack Bean ===
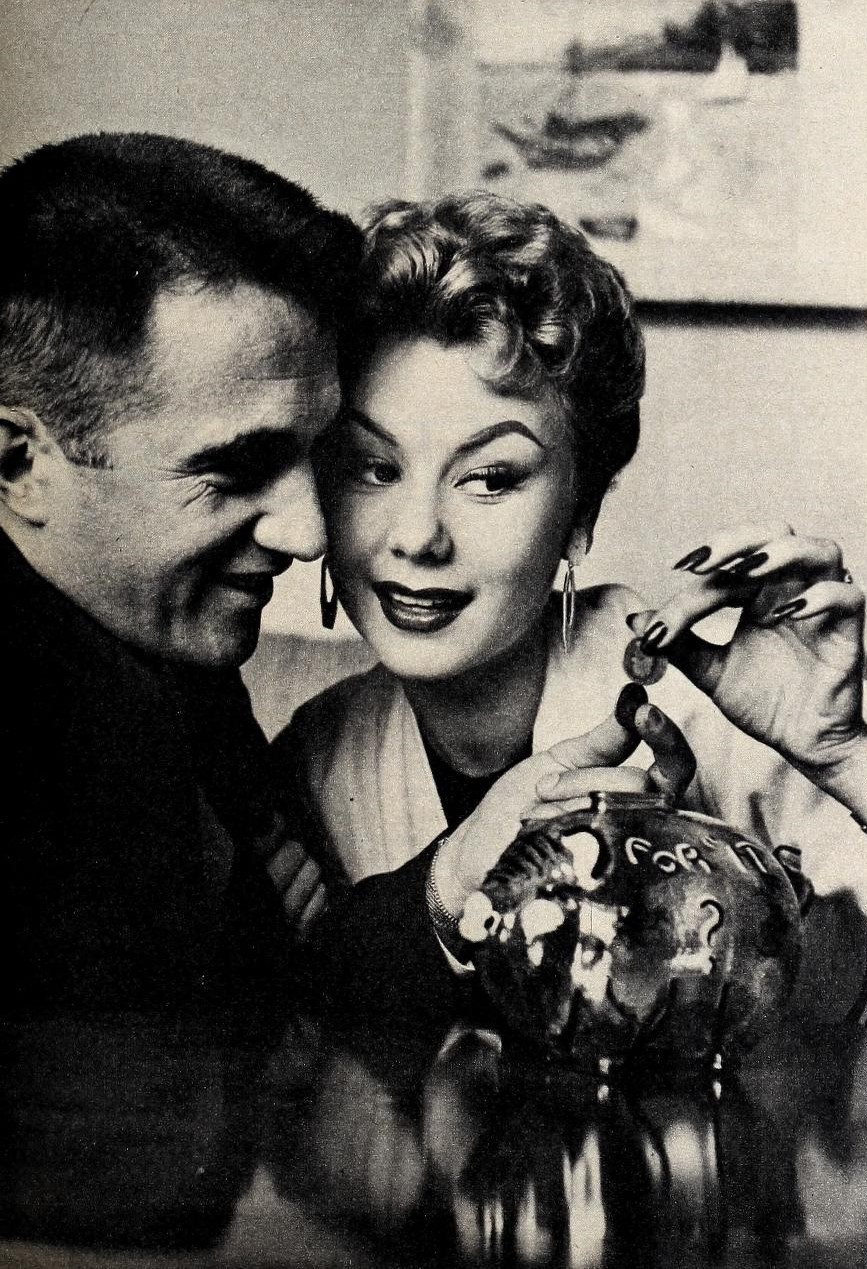
Mitzi Gaynor with her husband Jack Bean, circa 1955

Gaynor married Jack Bean, a talent agent and public relations executive for MCA, in San Francisco on November 18, 1954. Their home was on North Arden Drive in Beverly Hills, California. She had just been released from 20th Century-Fox (before the start of There's No Business Like Show Business) with four years left on her contract, and decided that since she had the time off, she would get married. The union was childless. After their marriage, Bean quit MCA, started his publicity firm named Bean and Rose, and managed Gaynor's career.

=== Paramount ===
In 1956, Gaynor appeared in the Paramount remake of Anything Goes, co-starring Bing Crosby, Donald O'Connor, and Zizi Jeanmaire, loosely based on the musical by Cole Porter, P. G. Wodehouse, and Guy Bolton. Paramount cast her in The Birds and the Bees (1956), playing the role originated by Barbara Stanwyck in The Lady Eve (1941). Her third film for Paramount was The Joker Is Wild (1957), a biopic of Joe E. Lewis starring Frank Sinatra, in which Gaynor played the female lead. In 1957, Gaynor appeared in MGM's Les Girls, directed by George Cukor, with Gene Kelly and Kay Kendall.

=== South Pacific ===
Gaynor's greatest international fame came from her starring role as Ensign Nellie Forbush in the film version of Rodgers and Hammerstein's South Pacific. For her performance, she was nominated for the Golden Globe Award for Best Actress – Motion Picture Comedy or Musical at the 1959 awards.

Gaynor followed that with Happy Anniversary (1959), co-starring David Niven, and the United Kingdom production Surprise Package (1960), a musical comedy thriller directed by Stanley Donen. Her co-stars were Yul Brynner and Noël Coward. The film's theme song is by Jimmy Van Heusen and Sammy Cahn (music and lyrics, respectively). Dancing and singing in a duet with Noël Coward, Gaynor performed this song in the film. Her last film role of this period was For Love or Money (1963), starring Kirk Douglas.

=== Later career ===
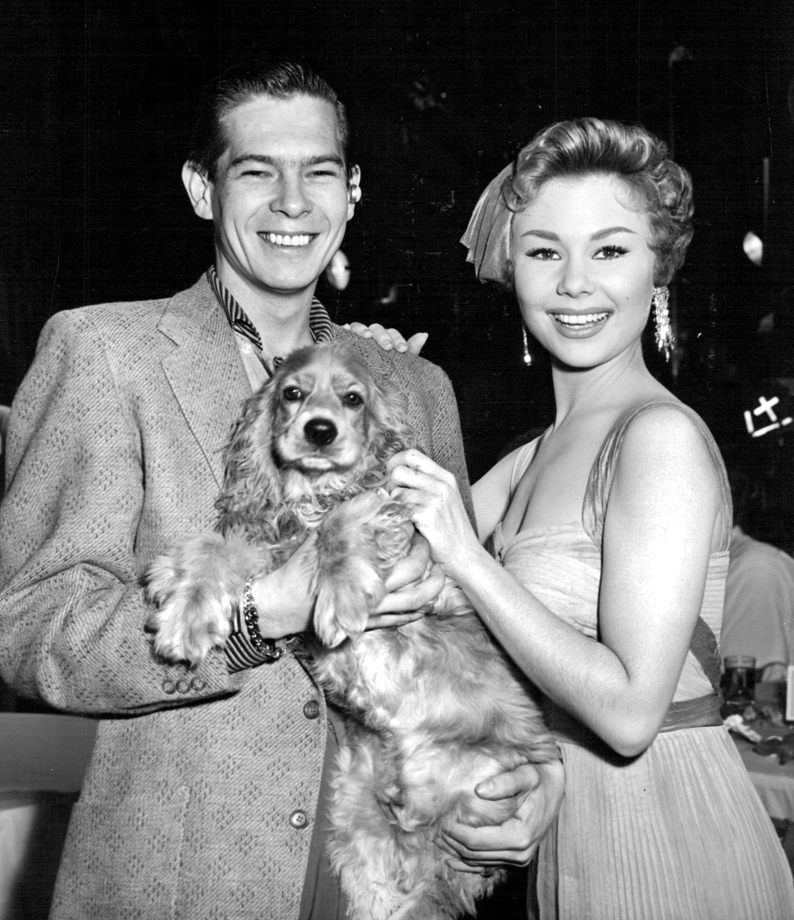
Gaynor with Johnnie Ray in 1954

Following her film work, Gaynor performed in other media. She appeared between two sets by the Beatles when they made their second appearance on The Ed Sullivan Show on February 16, 1964. She has recounted the irony of band members, already famous for their distinctive “mop-tops”, borrowing her hair dryer behind the scenes. Afterward, she had dinner with them and they asked for her autograph. Gaynor performed for a nine-minute segment from the stage of the Deauville Hotel in Miami Beach, separated by one commercial break. She sang "Too Darn Hot" and a blues medley. At the 1967 Academy Awards ceremony, she sang the theme from the film Georgy Girl. Gaynor later added the number to her concert repertoire. Through the 1960s and 1970s, she starred in nine television specials, which garnered 16 Emmy nominations.

During her nightclub years, Gaynor developed and rehearsed her routines at The Cave, a club in Vancouver, British Columbia, Canada. She became fond of the city and frequently made guest appearances on local television for interviews. "Mitzi's back in town" became an annual slogan when Gaynor would come to the city for a number of weeks each year to develop her Las Vegas routines.

Gaynor recorded two albums for the Verve Records label, one called Mitzi and the second called Mitzi Gaynor Sings the Lyrics of Ira Gershwin. She also recorded the title song from her film Happy Anniversary for the Top Rank label. For several decades, Gaynor appeared regularly in Las Vegas and at nightclub and concert venues throughout the United States and Canada.

During the 1990s, Gaynor became a featured columnist for The Hollywood Reporter.

On December 4, 2006, Jack Bean, Gaynor's husband of 52 years, died of pneumonia in the couple's home. He was 84.

On July 30, 2008, Gaynor – along with Kenny Ortega, Elizabeth Berkley, Shirley MacLaine, and the cast members from High School Musical, So You Think You Can Dance, Dancing with the Stars, and other performers – appeared on the Academy of Television Arts and Sciences TV Moves Live, a celebration of 60 years of dance on television. Gaynor appeared performing the final few bars of "Poor Papa", a song-and-dance number from her 1969 TV special, Mitzi's 2nd Special. Four months later, on November 18, 2008, City Lights Pictures released Mitzi Gaynor Razzle Dazzle: The Special Years, a documentary celebrating Gaynor's annual television specials of the 1960s and 1970s. The film, which was broadcast on public television and released on DVD, includes moments from the original specials (digitally remastered in 5.1 stereo) along with newly taped interviews with Gaynor colleagues, friends, and admirers, including Bob Mackie, Carl Reiner, Kristin Chenoweth, Rex Reed, Tony Charmoli, Alton Ruff, Randy Doney, and Kelli O'Hara. Gaynor's one-woman show Razzle Dazzle: My Life Behind the Sequins toured the United States and Vancouver from 2009 through 2014, including a two-week engagement in New York City.

== Personal life and death ==
Gaynor was married to Jack Bean from 1954 until his death in 2006; Bean was her manager. In 1960, they acquired the Beverly Hills home in which they lived until Bean's death. Gaynor and Bean had no children.

Gaynor died from natural causes in Los Angeles on October 17, 2024, at age 93.

== Honors and legacy ==
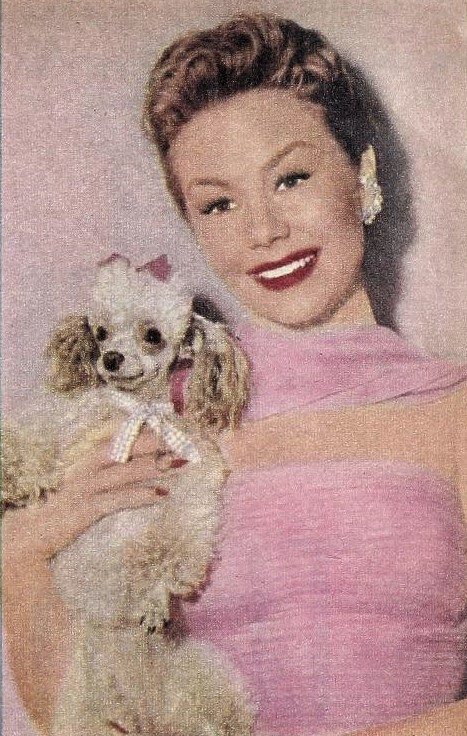
Gaynor in Photoplay 1956

For her contribution to the motion picture industry, Gaynor has a star on the Hollywood Walk of Fame at 6288 Hollywood Boulevard.

=== Awards and recognition ===
On October 14, 2006, the NY Alumni "adopted" Gaynor as an official "New Yorker" at Beverly Hills High School. New York City mayor Michael Bloomberg issued a proclamation paying tribute to her distinguished career as a singer, dancer, actress, and writer.

In 2007, Gaynor was honored by the Museum of Television & Radio in Los Angeles at an event celebrating her television work. In conjunction with the event, the museum mounted Mitzi by Mackie in its Bell Family Gallery, featuring 26 costumes designed by Bob Mackie for Gaynor, along with a selection of Mackie's matching sketches.

On March 8, 2009, Gaynor was honored with the 2009 Boston Youth Moves lifetime achievement award, presented by Chita Rivera at Swellegance, the Boston Youth Moves annual fundraiser in Boston.

On July 10, 2009, she was honored with the Tremaine 2009 Entertainer of the Year Award at the Joe Tremaine Dance Conventions and Competitions national finals gala in Orlando, Florida.

On November 7, 2009, Gaynor was honored with Chapman University's Lifetime Achievement in the Arts Award during the 28th annual American Celebration gala at Chapman University in Orange, California.

On April 13, 2010, she was honored with the Bob Harrington Lifetime Achievement Award at the 25th annual Bistro Awards in New York City.

On April 18, 2010, Gaynor won the 2010 National Academy of Television Arts and Sciences – New York Chapter Emmy Award for Outstanding Entertainment Program/Special for her public television musical documentary Mitzi Gaynor: Razzle Dazzle! The Special Years.

On September 10, 2016, Gaynor was honored with the inaugural Legend Award from Nigel Lythgoe's Dizzy Feet Foundation.

On September 30, 2017, Gaynor was inducted into the Songbook Hall of Fame.

=== Preservation ===
Gaynor donated an extensive collection of notated music, charts, and other memorabilia created for Gaynor's shows, nightclub acts, and television specials to the Great American Songbook Foundation in 2017.

== Television specials ==
On October 14, 1968, Gaynor starred in Mitzi, her first television special. In specials including Mitzi – The First Time and Mitzi ... Zings into Spring, she showcased the talents she had first used as a theatrical performer, then in films such as There's No Business Like Show Business, Les Girls, and South Pacific, and finally as a concert performer.

=== List of television specials ===
- The Kraft Music Hall: The Mitzi Gaynor Christmas Show (1967) (NBC)
- Mitzi (1968) (NBC)
- Mitzi's 2nd Special (1969) (NBC)
- Mitzi...The First Time (1973) (CBS)
- Mitzi...A Tribute to the American Housewife (1974) (CBS)
- Mitzi...and a Hundred Guys (1975) (CBS)
- Mitzi...Roarin' In the 20's (1976) (CBS)
- Mitzi...Zings Into Spring (1977) (CBS)
- Mitzi...What's Hot, What's Not (1978) (CBS)
- Mitzi Gaynor: Razzle Dazzle! The Special Years (2008) (PBS)

== Filmography ==
Year	Title	Role
1950	My Blue Heaven	Gloria Adams
1951	Take Care of My Little Girl	Adelaide Swanson
1951	Golden Girl	Lotta Crabtree
1952	We're Not Married!	Patricia 'Patsy' Reynolds Fisher
1952	Bloodhounds of Broadway	Emily Ann Stackerlee
1953	The I Don't Care Girl	Eva Tanguay
1953	Down Among the Sheltering Palms	Rozouila
1954	Three Young Texans	Rusty Blair
1954	There's No Business Like Show Business	Katy Donahue
1956	Anything Goes	Patsy Blair
1956	The Birds and the Bees	Jean Harris
1957	The Joker Is Wild	Martha Stewart
1957	Les Girls	Joanne 'Joy' Henderson
1958	South Pacific	Ensign Nellie Forbush, USN
1959	Happy Anniversary	Alice Walters nee Gans
1960	Surprise Package	Gabby Rogers
1963	For Love or Money	Kate Brasher
2021	Rita Moreno: Just a Girl Who Decided to Go for It	Herself
