= Oliver Stapleton =

English cinematographer

- Born: Oliver David Whiteside Stapleton; 12 April 1948 (age 78); London, England
- Years active: 1973–2022

Oliver David Whiteside Stapleton (born 12 April 1948), is an English cinematographer, known for collaborations with directors Julien Temple, Stephen Frears and Michael Hoffman.

== Life and career ==
He graduated from the University of Cape Town in 1970 with a degree in psychology and from the National Film and Television School (NFTS) UK while working in South Africa (from 1966 to 1974) and England.

One of his first efforts was the student film Shadowplay, a film about South African immigrants trying to adjust to life in London, which he wrote, directed, and edited. He progressed to filming music videos and commercials. He worked with many famous bands in the early-to-mid 80s, including a-ha, David Bowie, The Rolling Stones, Eddy Grant and The Human League.

== Filmography ==
=== Film ===
Year	Title	Director	Notes
1982	The Secret Policeman's Other Ball	Julien Temple	
1982	Oral History	Peter Chappell	
1983	Mantrap	Julien Temple	
1985	Restless Natives	Michael Hoffman	
1985	My Beautiful Laundrette	Stephen Frears	
1985	Running Out of Luck	Julien Temple	
1986	Absolute Beginners	Julien Temple	
1987	Prick Up Your Ears	Stephen Frears	
1987	Sammy and Rosie Get Laid	Stephen Frears	
1987	Chuck Berry Hail! Hail! Rock'n’Roll	Taylor Hackford	Documentary film
1988	Earth Girls Are Easy	Julien Temple	
1989	Cookie	Susan Seidelman	
1989	She-Devil	Susan Seidelman	
1990	The Grifters	Stephen Frears	
1991	Let Him Have It	Peter Medak	
1992	Hero	Stephen Frears	
1993	Look Who's Talking Now	Tom Ropelewski	
1995	Restoration	Michael Hoffman	
1996	The Van	Stephen Frears	
1996	Kansas City	Robert Altman	
1996	One Fine Day	Michael Hoffman	
1997	The Designated Mourner	David Hare	
1998	The Object of My Affection	Nicholas Hytner	
1998	The Hi-Lo Country	Stephen Frears	
1999	A Midsummer Night's Dream	Michael Hoffman	
1999	The Cider House Rules	Lasse Hallström	
2000	State and Main	David Mamet	
2000	Pay It Forward	Mimi Leder	
2001	Birthday Girl	Jez Butterworth	
2001	Buffalo Soldiers	Gregor Jordan	
2001	The Shipping News	Lasse Hallström	
2003	Ned Kelly	Gregor Jordan	Also camera operator
2003	Cheeky	David Thewlis	
2005	Casanova	Lasse Hallström	
2005	An Unfinished Life	Lasse Hallström	
2006	The Hoax	Lasse Hallström	
2007	The Water Horse: Legend of the Deep	Jay Russell	
2008	How to Lose Friends & Alienate People	Robert B. Weide	
2009	The Proposal	Anne Fletcher	
2010	Unthinkable	Gregor Jordan	
2010	Don't Be Afraid of the Dark	Troy Nixey	
2011	Will	Ellen Perry	
2012	The Guilt Trip	Anne Fletcher	
2014	The Best of Me	Michael Hoffman	
2015	Unfinished Business	Ken Scott	
2015	Hot Pursuit	Anne Fletcher	
2016	The Comedian	Taylor Hackford	
2018	Gore	Michael Hoffman	Unreleased
2022	The People We Hate at the Wedding	Claire Scanlon	

=== Television ===
TV movies

Year	Title	Director
1989	Danny, the Champion of the World	Gavin Millar

TV series

Year	Title	Director	Notes
1983-1988	The Comic Strip	Sandy Johnson; Stephen Frears; Adrian Edmondson	6 episodes
1984	Billy Rankin: Baby Come Back	Pete Cornish	TV special
1991-1993	Screen Two	David Hare; Stephen Frears	Segments Heading Home and The Snapper
1993	The Young Indiana Jones Chronicles	Gavin Millar	Episode "Peking, March 1910"
1995	The Adventures of Young Indiana Jones	Deepa Mehta; Gavin Millar	Segment "Journey of Radiance"
1996	Great Performances	Robert Altman	Episode "Jazz '34"

== Awards ==
- 1986 – won MTV Video Music Award for Best Cinematography for "The Sun Always Shines on T.V." by a-ha.
- nominated for ACE Award for Danny, the Champion of the World.
- 1990 – nominated for Independent Spirit Award for Best Cinematography for Earth Girls Are Easy.
- 2001 – nominated for Camerimage Golden Frog for Buffalo Soldiers.
- 2003 – nominated for AFI Award for Ned Kelly.
