= 36th People's Choice Awards =

Pop culture award show held in 2010

- Date: January 6, 2010
- Location: Nokia Theatre, Los Angeles, California, United States
- Hosted by: Queen Latifah

Television/radio coverage
- Network: CBS

The 36th People's Choice Awards, honoring the best in popular culture for 2009, was held on January 6, 2010, at the Nokia Theatre in Los Angeles, California, and was broadcast on CBS. Not all of the awards were presented on air during the show, as many including Favorite Movie were left out. As well as Favorite Actor, Johnny Depp also won the Actor/Actress of the Decade award.

== Performers ==
- Mary J. Blige
- Cobra Starship (duet with Nicole Scherzinger)

== Nominees ==
Winners are listed in bold.

| Favorite Movie Actor | Favorite Movie Actress |
|---|---|
| Brad Pitt; Hugh Jackman; **Johnny Depp**; Robert Pattinson; Ryan Reynolds | Anne Hathaway; Drew Barrymore; Jennifer Aniston; Kristen Stewart; **Sandra Bullock** |
| Favorite Action Star | Favorite Comedic Star |
| Christian Bale; Gerard Butler; **Hugh Jackman**; Shia LaBeouf; Vin Diesel | Adam Sandler; Ben Stiller; **Jim Carrey**; Ryan Reynolds; Vince Vaughn |
| Favorite Breakout Movie Actress | Favorite Breakout Movie Actor |
| Anna Kendrick; Emily Osment; Ginnifer Goodwin; **Miley Cyrus**; Zoe Saldaña | Chris Pine; Joseph Gordon Levitt; Sam Worthington; **Taylor Lautner**; Zachary Quinto |
| Favorite On-Screen Team | Favorite Independent Movie |
| Daniel Radcliffe, Emma Watson, & Rupert Grint, Harry Potter and the Half-Blood Prince; Ryan Reynolds & Sandra Bullock, The Proposal; Shia LaBeouf & Megan Fox, Transformers: Revenge of the Fallen; **Kristen Stewart, Robert Pattinson, & Taylor Lautner, Twilight & The Twilight Saga: New Moon**; Daniel Henney, Dominic Monaghan, Hugh Jackman, Liev Schreiber, Ryan Reynolds, & will.i.am, X-Men Origins: Wolverine | (500) Days of Summer; District 9; **Inglourious Basterds**; Paranormal Activity; Madea Goes To Jail |
| Favorite Comedy Movie | Favorite Movie |
| 17 Again; Bride Wars; The Hangover; He's Just Not That Into You; **The Proposal** | The Hangover; Harry Potter and the Half-Blood Prince; The Proposal; Star Trek; **Twilight** |
| Favorite TV Drama | Favorite TV Comedy |
| CSI: Crime Scene Investigation; Grey's Anatomy; **House**; Lost; NCIS | **The Big Bang Theory**; Desperate Housewives; How I Met Your Mother; The Office; Two And A Half Men |
| Favorite TV Drama Actor | Favorite TV Drama Actress |
| **Hugh Laurie**; Kiefer Sutherland; Mark Harmon; Matthew Fox; Patrick Dempsey | Anna Paquin; Blake Lively; Jennifer Love Hewitt; **Katherine Heigl**; Mariska Hargitay |
| Favorite TV Comedy Actor | Favorite TV Comedy Actress |
| Alec Baldwin; Charlie Sheen; Jim Parsons; Neil Patrick Harris; **Steve Carell** | **Alyson Hannigan**; America Ferrera; Amy Poehler; Eva Longoria; Tina Fey |
| Favorite TV Obsession | Favorite Competition Show |
| Dexter; Gossip Girl; The Hills; The Secret Life of the American Teenager; **True Blood** | **American Idol**; Dancing with the Stars; Project Runway; So You Think You Can Dance; Survivor: Samoa |
| Favorite New TV Drama | Favorite New TV Comedy |
| FlashForward; The Good Wife; NCIS: Los Angeles; V; **The Vampire Diaries** | Accidentally on Purpose; The Cleveland Show; Cougar Town; **Glee**; Modern Family |
| Favorite Animal Show | Favorite Male Artist |
| Animal Cops; **Dog Whisperer**; DogTown; It's Me or The Dog; Rescue Ink Unleashed | Eminem; Jason Mraz; John Mayer; **Keith Urban**; Tim McGraw |
| Favorite Female Artist | Favorite Country Artist |
| Beyoncé; Britney Spears; Carrie Underwood; Pink; **Taylor Swift** | Brad Paisley; **Carrie Underwood**; Keith Urban; Rascal Flatts; Taylor Swift |
| Favorite Breakout Music Artist | Favorite Rock Band |
| Adam Lambert; Demi Lovato; Kris Allen; **Lady Gaga**; Susan Boyle | Daughtry; Green Day; Kings Of Leon; Muse; **Paramore** |
| Favorite Music Collaboration | Favorite R&B Artist |
| "Good Girls Go Bad" by Cobra Starship & Leighton Meester; "I'm on a Boat" by The Lonely Island & T-Pain; "Live Your Life" by T.I. & Rihanna; "Lucky" by Jason Mraz & Colbie Caillat; **"Run This Town" by Jay-Z, Rihanna, & Kanye West** | Alicia Keys; Beyoncé; Jennifer Hudson; **Mariah Carey**; Usher |
| Favorite Pop Artist | Favorite Hip-Hop Artist |
| The Black Eyed Peas; Britney Spears; Katy Perry; **Lady Gaga**; Taylor Swift | **Eminem**; Flo Rida; Jay-Z; Lil' Wayne; T.I. |
| Favorite Franchise | Favorite Family Movie |
| Harry Potter; Star Trek; Transformers; **The Twilight Saga**; X-Men | Hannah Montana: The Movie; Ice Age: Dawn of the Dinosaurs; Night at the Museum: Battle of the Smithsonian; **Up**; Where the Wild Things Are |
| Favorite Sci-Fi/Fantasy Show | Favorite Talk Show |
| Heroes; Lost; **Supernatural**; True Blood; The Vampire Diaries | Chelsea Lately; **The Ellen DeGeneres Show**; Live with Regis and Kelly; The Oprah Winfrey Show; The Tyra Banks Show |
Favorite Web Celeb
Andy Samberg; **Ashton Kutcher**; Miley Cyrus; P.Diddy; Will Ferrell

== Presenters ==
- Ellen DeGeneres
- Rascal Flatts
- Kate Walsh
- Sofia Vergara
- James Denton
- Chevy Chase
- Christian Slater
- Jenna Elfman
- Kellan Lutz
- Paula Patton
- will.i.am
- George Lopez
- Jackie Chan
- Queen Latifah
- Josh Holloway
- Ginnifer Goodwin
- Demi Lovato
- Colbie Caillat
- Jessica Alba
- Kathryn Morris
- LL Cool J
- Greg Grunberg
- Taraji P. Henson
- Sacha Baron Cohen
- Katie Cassidy
