= Priscilla Nedd-Friendly =

American film editor

- Occupation: Film editor

Priscilla Nedd-Friendly is an American film editor.

She was in a relationship with producer, Don Simpson, in the early-1980s (when Simpson was Paramount's president of production); Nedd broke up with Simpson when she started seeing actor, Tim Matheson.

== Filmography ==
Editor
Year	Film	Director	Notes
1983	Eddie and the Cruisers	Martin Davidson	
1984	No Small Affair	Jerry Schatzberg	First collaboration with Jerry Schatzberg
1984	The Flamingo Kid	Garry Marshall	First collaboration with Garry Marshall
1986	Lucas	David Seltzer	
1987	Street Smart	Jerry Schatzberg	Second collaboration with Jerry Schatzberg
1988	Tucker: The Man and His Dream	Francis Ford Coppola	
1990	Pretty Woman	Garry Marshall	Second collaboration with Garry Marshall
1991	Guilty by Suspicion	Irwin Winkler	
1991	Doc Hollywood	Michael Caton-Jones	
1992	That Night	Craig Bolotin	
1993	Undercover Blues	Herbert Ross	
1994	Clean Slate	Mick Jackson	
1996	The Evening Star	Robert Harling	
1998	Sour Grapes	Larry David	
1998	Rusty: A Dog's Tale	Shuki Levy	
1999	American Pie	Paul Weitz	First collaboration with the Weitz brothers
2001	Down to Earth	Chris Weitz; Paul Weitz	Second collaboration with the Weitz brothers
2002	Stuart Little 2	Rob Minkoff	First collaboration with Rob Minkoff
2003	The Haunted Mansion	Rob Minkoff	Second collaboration with Rob Minkoff
2006	Big Momma's House 2	John Whitesell	First collaboration with John Whitesell
2006	We Are Marshall	McG	
2008	27 Dresses	Anne Fletcher	First collaboration with Anne Fletcher
2009	The Proposal	Anne Fletcher	Second collaboration with Anne Fletcher
2010	The Back-up Plan	Alan Poul	
2011	Big Mommas: Like Father, Like Son	John Whitesell	Second collaboration with John Whitesell
2011	The Darkest Hour	Chris Gorak	
2012	The Guilt Trip	Anne Fletcher	Third collaboration with Anne Fletcher
2013	Delivery Man	Ken Scott	
2015	Hot Pursuit	Anne Fletcher	Fourth collaboration with Anne Fletcher
2018	Forever My Girl	Bethany Ashton Wolf	
2018	Book Club	Bill Holderman	
2019	Tall Girl	Nzingha Stewart	
2021	Finding ʻOhana	Jude Weng	
2021	Love Hard	Hernán Jiménez	
2024	Afraid	Chris Weitz	Third collaboration with the Weitz brothers

Editorial department
Year	Film	Director	Role	Notes
1977	Hot Tomorrows	Martin Brest	Assistant editor	
1979	Americathon	Neal Israel	Assistant editor	Uncredited
1980	American Gigolo	Paul Schrader	Assistant film editor	
1980	Urban Cowboy	James Bridges	Assistant editor	
1981	An Eye for an Eye	Steve Carver	Additional film editor	
1982	An Officer and a Gentleman	Taylor Hackford	Associate editor	
1989	Dead Poets Society	Peter Weir	Additional film editor	

Producer
Year	Film	Director	Credit
2001	Down to Earth	Chris Weitz; Paul Weitz	Associate producer

Thanks
Year	Film	Director	Role
2023	Beautiful Disaster	Roger Kumble	Thanks

Documentaries

Thanks
Year	Film	Director	Role
2015	Sneakerheadz	David T. Friendly; Mick Partridge	Special thanks

TV movies

Editor
Year	Film	Director
2012	Steel Magnolias	Kenny Leon
2014	In My Dreams	Kenny Leon

Editorial department
Year	Film	Director	Role	Notes
2000	If These Walls Could Talk 2	Jane Anderson; Anne Heche	Supervising editor	"1961" and "2000" segments

TV series

Editor
Year	Title	Notes
2009	Celebrity Scandals from Funny or Die	1 episode
2014	Selfie	1 episode
2016−17	Queen of the South	7 episodes
2023	True Lies	1 episode
