= Michael Mosley (actor) =

American actor (born 1978)

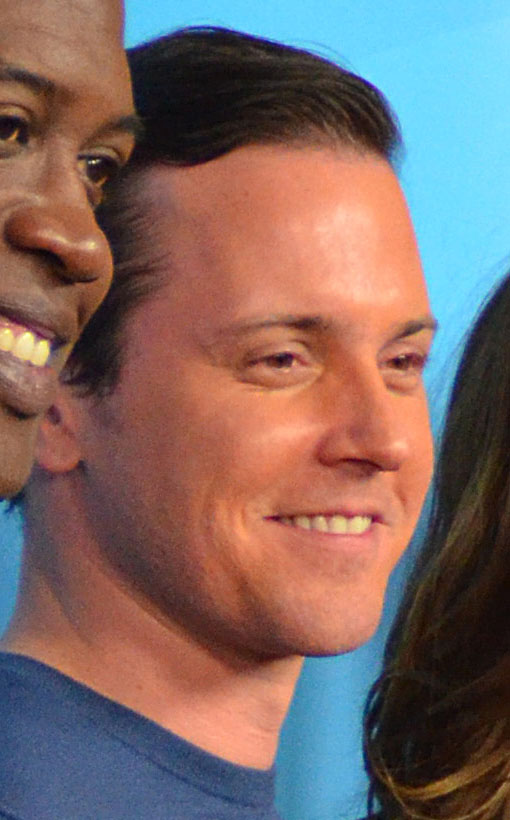
- Mosley in 2015
- Born: September 16, 1978 (age 48); Cedar Falls, Iowa, U.S.
- Occupation: Actor
- Years active: 2001–present
- Spouse: Anna Camp (m. 2010; div. 2013)

Michael Mosley (born September 16, 1978) is an American television and film actor, best known for his roles as Drew Suffin on Scrubs (2009–2010), Ted Vanderway on Pan Am (2011–2012), Jerry Tyson aka 3XK on Castle (2010, 2012, & 2015), Johnny Farrell on Sirens (2014–2015), Pastor Mason Young on the Netflix crime drama Ozark (2017–2018), and Everett Lynch on Criminal Minds (2019–2020).

== Personal life ==
Mosley was born in Cedar Falls, Iowa. He was engaged to actress Anna Camp by September 2008; they married in 2010 and filed for divorce in 2013.

== Filmography ==
Key
†	Denotes films that have not yet been released

=== Film ===
Year	Title	Role	Notes
2003	The Bog Creatures	Nick Warren	Film debut role
2004	Brother to Brother	White Man #1 on Subway	
2005	Swimmers	Mike Tyler	
2005	Building Girl	Nick	
2006	The Insurgents	James	
2006	The Big Bad Swim	Shawn	
2006	Bella	Kevin	
2006	Room 314	David	
2007	Goodbye Baby	Kevin	
2008	27 Dresses	Trent (Bar Dude)	
2008	The Accidental Husband	Declan	
2009	Four Single Fathers	Ron	
2009	The Proposal	Chuck	
2010	After Lilly	Philip	
2011	Restive	Braker	
2012	You're Nobody 'til Somebody Kills You	Detective Francelli	
2013	Autumn Wanderer	Rick	
2015	Hot Pursuit	Detective Dixon	
2015	Other People's Children	Josh	
2016	Fluidic	Ultra	Project cancelled after filming
2016	LBJ	Kenneth O'Donnell	
2017	A Crooked Somebody	Bill Banning	
2018	Peppermint	Robert Henderson	
2019	Sister Aimee	Kenny	
2020	Atypical Wednesday	Randy	
2022	In Sickness and in Health	George	Short film
2024	Neo-Dome	—N/a	
2025	Signing Tony Raymond	Walt McFadden	

=== Television ===
Year	Title	Role	Notes
2001	The Education of Max Bickford	Quincy	3 episodes
2002	Law & Order: Special Victims Unit	Ronnie the Informant	Episode: "Protection"
2002	Third Watch	Stoner #1	Episode: "The Chosen Few"
2002	Hack	Lowlife #1	Episode: "All Night Long"
2006	Conviction	Detective Calloway	Episode: "Pilot"
2006	Alpha Mom	Bob	Television film
2006–2007	Kidnapped	FBI Agent Malcolm Atkins	13 episodes
2008	The Wire	Raymond Wiley	Episode: "Late Editions"
2008	Generation Kill	Gunnery Sgt. Robert Swarr	Episode: "Stay Frosty"
2009	The Mentalist	Sheriff Hardy	Episode: "Red John's Footsteps"
2009	Kings	Eli Shepherd	4 episodes
2009	Three Rivers	JC Dawson	Episode: "Place of Life"
2009–2010	Scrubs	Drew Suffin	Main role (season 9)
2010	Law & Order: Los Angeles	Robert Forrester	Episode: "Pasadena"
2010	The Closer	Jeff Darby	Episode: "Old Money"
2010–2015	Castle	Jerry Tyson / 3XK	4 episodes
2011	Justified	Kyle Easterly	3 episodes
2011	Happy Endings	Malcolm	Episode: "Your Couples, Friends & Neighbors"
2011	FutureStates	Expectant Father	Episode: "Beholder"
2011–2012	Pan Am	Ted Vanderway	14 episodes
2012	30 Rock	Scott Scottsman	2 episodes
2012	Revolution	Private Richards	Episode: "No Quarter"
2012–2013	Last Resort	Hal Anders	4 episodes
2012–2014	Longmire	Sean Keegan	7 episodes
2014–2015	Sirens	Johnny	23 episodes
2016	Elementary	Al Baxter	Episode: "You've Got Me, Who's Got You?"
2016	Rush Hour	Jack Douglas	Episode: "The Dark Night"
2016–2017	Fear the Walking Dead: Passage	Colton	Web series 9 episodes
2017–2018	Ozark	Pastor Mason Young	9 episodes
2018	Queen Fur	—N/a	Unsold pilot
2018	Seven Seconds	Joe "Fish" Rinaldi	10 episodes
2018	FBI	U.S. Marshal Paul Ackerman	Episode: "Compromised"
2019	Brooklyn Nine-Nine	Franco McCoy	Episode: "The Crime Scene"
2019	Titans	Doctor Light / Arthur Light	4 episodes
2019–2020	Criminal Minds	Everett Lynch	Recurring role (season 15), 6 episodes
2020	Next	C.M.	10 episodes
2021	The Sinner	Colin Muldoon	Recurring role (season 4), 8 episodes
2022	The Girl from Plainville	Joseph Cataldo	5 episodes
2022	The Calling	Detective Earl Malzone	8 episodes
2025	Ballard	Ted Rawls	10 episode (main character)
2025	The Savant †	TBA	Miniseries

=== Video games ===
Year	Title	Role	Notes
2026	Grand Theft Auto VI	The Local Population	
