= 27 Dresses =

2008 film by Anne Fletcher

- Theatrical release poster
- Directed by: Anne Fletcher
- Written by: Aline Brosh McKenna
- Produced by: Gary Barber; Roger Birnbaum; Jonathan Glickman
- Starring: Katherine Heigl; James Marsden; Malin Åkerman; Judy Greer; Edward Burns
- Cinematography: Peter James
- Edited by: Priscilla Nedd-Friendly
- Music by: Randy Edelman
- Production companies: Fox 2000 Pictures; Spyglass Entertainment; Dune Entertainment
- Distributed by: 20th Century Fox
- Release dates: January 10, 2008 (Australia); January 18, 2008 (United States)
- Running time: 111 minutes
- Country: United States
- Language: English
- Budget: $30 million
- Box office: $162.7 million

27 Dresses is a 2008 American romantic comedy film directed by Anne Fletcher and written by Aline Brosh McKenna. It stars Katherine Heigl, with James Marsden, Edward Burns, Malin Akerman, and Judy Greer in supporting roles.

Produced by Spyglass Entertainment and distributed by 20th Century Fox, the film was conceived following the success of McKenna's screenplay for The Devil Wears Prada (2006). Principal photography took place in New York City and Rhode Island from May to July 2007.

After Jane Nichols has been a bridesmaid 27 times, she reaches a turning point when her younger sister Tess swoops by her work one day, capturing the attention of her boss George, whom Jane secretly loves, and rapidly becoming engaged to him.

27 Dresses premiered in Los Angeles on January 9, 2008, and was released theatrically in the United States on January 18. The film received mixed reviews from critics, with praise for Heigl's performance and criticism of its formulaic plot. It was a commercial success, grossing $162.7 million worldwide against a $30 million budget.

== Plot ==
From the age of eight, Jane Nichols has felt destined to help weddings run smoothly. Shortly after her mother's passing, she helps a bride with a crisis before her wedding ceremony and is hooked. From then on, Jane loves weddings, especially her own.

Two decades later, Jane has been a bridesmaid at 27 weddings, putting others' needs ahead of her own. Crisscrossing the city to attend two weddings simultaneously one evening, she finds herself sharing a cab with Kevin Doyle, a cynical reporter who disdains her romantic ideals. She accidentally leaves her Filofax day planner behind, which Kevin uses to research her.

Writing under the pseudonym "Malcolm," Kevin sees Jane as a potential subject for a story. He pitches it as a cover story to his editor for the Commitments section. Kevin is promised a promotion to Features if the article is worthy for the section's front page.

At work, Jane's boss George returns from a climbing trip and Jane barely hides her crush. Her friend and coworker Casey slaps her to wipe the goofy look off her face. Jane's unspoken feelings for George are obvious to everyone but him.

Jane's man-crazy younger sister Tess returns from a six-month European tour. They talk about their parents' wedding briefly after Tess sees articles written by Malcolm, whose writing Jane loves. Tess arrives to Jane's workmate's engagement party, before Jane can declare her feelings to George. The younger sister catches his eye so they spend the evening together.

Kevin shows up, revealing the flowers Jane had received were from him. She releases her frustration elsewhere, recomposing herself. Kevin returns her planner, then offers to buy Jane a drink, but she declines. Tess pumps Jane for information about George and learns about his preferences. She pretends to share his interests, such as being a vegetarian, an outdoors person and liking dogs. They spend lots of time together, and quickly become engaged.

Tess and George share their news with the sisters' father Hal, who happily gives her their mother's wedding dress. Jane, though heartbroken, agrees. Seeking a sympathetic ear, she contacts Kevin, who coaches her on how to say no, as she does not want to plan the wedding.

Jane nevertheless gets roped into the planning. Tess's ideas include model-like bridesmaids and a funny slideshow. She also reintroduces Jane to The Boathouse. Jane is floored, as it is her dream wedding venue, the place where their parents wed.

Right after Jane convinces a busy baker to create a masterpiece cake for the wedding in three weeks, Malcolm Doyle introduces himself. Shocked, she calls him an "asshole". Kevin explains he uses the pseudonym for anonymity. Appalled, Jane asks him which is his true self, the eloquent wedding writer or the cynic, and he asserts it is the latter.

Kevin invites himself to Jane's apartment, supposedly for his article on Tess and George's wedding. He notices her closet bursting with bridesmaid dresses and photographs Jane doing an impromptu fashion show of all 27. She explains the bride's happiness is paramount, so she is always amiable.

While concealing his goal to write about Jane, Kevin continues researching her. During the process, they bond. Though Kevin develops genuine feelings for her, his article is published without her knowledge and before he can warn her. Jane discovers the piece, feels betrayed and ends their relationship.

Meanwhile, Tess's deceptions begin to unravel. She drastically alters their late mother's wedding dress, prompting a rift with Jane. At Tess's engagement party, Jane retaliates by showing a slide show, exposing Tess's machinations. When George sees Tess's dishonesty and manipulation, including paying his young mentee to clean, he cancels the wedding.

At work, George compliments Jane for her reliability, echoing Kevin's remark that she never says no. Realizing her motivations have been driven by unrequited love, Jane quits. After kissing George briefly, she acknowledges her feelings for him have faded. She later finds Kevin at another wedding and declares her love.

One year later, Jane and Kevin marry in a beach ceremony. All 27 brides for whom Jane previously stood serve as bridesmaids, each wearing the dress Jane wore at their weddings.

== Cast ==
- Katherine Heigl as Jane Nichols
  - Peyton List as young Jane Nichols
- James Marsden as Kevin "Malcolm" Doyle
- Malin Åkerman as Tess Nichols
  - Charli Barcena as young Tess Nichols
- Judy Greer as Casey
- Melora Hardin as Maureen
- Brian Kerwin as Hal Nichols
- Maulik Pancholy as Trent
- Edward Burns as George
- David Castro as Pedro
- Krysten Ritter as Gina
- Jane Pfitsch as Cousin Lisa
- Michael Ziegfeld as Khaleel
- Ronald Guttman as Antoine
- Jennifer Lim as Salesgirl
- Bern Cohen as Rabbi
- Ron Simons as Boathouse Chef
- Robert Clohessy as Bartender
- Michael Mosley as Bar Dude
- Jennifer Bassey as Aunt
- Alexa Havins as Boat Bride

== Production ==
Principal photography for 27 Dresses began on May 10, 2007, with filming taking place primarily in Rhode Island. Notable locations included the Rosecliff and Marble House mansions in Newport, a beach in Charlestown, and sites in East Greenwich and Providence. Additional filming occurred over a two-week period in New York City.

Costume design was led by Catherine Marie Thomas. Director Anne Fletcher requested that the bridesmaid dresses be "big, ugly, and bright," representing a wide range of color palettes and styles. Thomas designed approximately fifty potential dresses and a few suits, from which she and Fletcher selected twenty-seven to feature in the film.

== Release ==
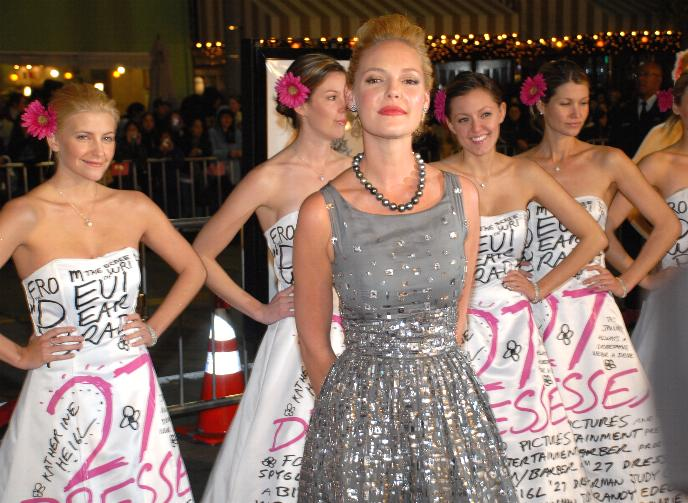
Katherine Heigl at the film's premiere in Westwood, Los Angeles

=== Box office ===
27 Dresses was released theatrically in the United States on January 18, 2008. It opened at number two at the North American box office, earning $23 million in its opening weekend, behind Cloverfield. The film went on to gross $76.8 million in North America and $85.8 million internationally, for a worldwide total of $162.7 million against a production budget of $30 million.

According to BoxOfficeGuru.com, the film's audience was predominantly female, with studio research indicating that 75 percent of viewers were women. The demographic was otherwise evenly divided between viewers over and under the age of 25.

=== Critical response ===
On the review aggregator website Rotten Tomatoes, 41% of 154 critics' reviews are positive, with an average rating of 5.3/10. The website's consensus reads: "The filmmakers perfectly follow the well-worn romantic comedy formula, rendering 27 Dresses clichéd and mostly forgettable." Metacritic, which uses a weighted average, assigned the film a score of 47 out of 100, based on 31 critics, indicating "mixed or average" reviews. Audiences polled by CinemaScore gave the film an average grade of "B+" on an A+ to F scale.

Cath Clarke of The Guardian criticized the film for underutilizing Katherine Heigl’s comedic abilities, writing, "What a maddening waste of Heigl this insipid romantic comedy is." Clarke felt the script missed an opportunity for satire within the Manhattan wedding scene. Peter Howell of the Toronto Star wrote that the film "shamelessly trades in the hoariest of chick-flick clichés" and faulted screenwriter Aline Brosh McKenna for relying on "cheap gags" rather than the incisive wit found in her earlier work, The Devil Wears Prada (2006).

== Accolades ==
Award	Date of ceremony	Category	Recipient(s)	Result	Ref.
Artios Awards	November 10, 2008	Outstanding Achievement in Casting - Studio Feature - Comedy	Cathy Sandrich Gelfond and Amanda Mackey	Nominated	
People's Choice Awards	January 7, 2009	Favorite Comedy Movie	27 Dresses	Won	
Teen Choice Awards	August 4, 2008	Choice Movie: Chick Flick	27 Dresses	Won	
Teen Choice Awards	August 4, 2008	Choice Movie Actor: Comedy	James Marsden (also for Enchanted)	Nominated	
Golden Trailer Awards	May 8, 2008	Best Romance	27 Dresses	Nominated	
Golden Trailer Awards	May 8, 2008	Best Romance Poster	27 Dresses	Won	
Golden Trailer Awards	May 8, 2008	Best Romance TV Spot	27 Dresses – "Invite Event"	Won	
Alliance of Women Film Journalists	December 15, 2008	Hall of Shame	27 Dresses	Won	

== Soundtrack ==
The film features an original score composed by Randy Edelman. In addition to the score, 27 Dresses includes numerous contemporary songs by other artists, which are used throughout the film. However, these tracks are not included on the official soundtrack release, which contains only Edelman's original compositions.

- "Born to Fight" – Tracy Chapman
- "Peace Train" – Cat Stevens
- "Valerie" - Mark Ronson featuring Amy Winehouse
- "I Don't Want to Be" – Gavin DeGraw
- "Over and Over" – Tim McGraw
- "Anticipation" – Carly Simon
- "Change of Heart" – Cyndi Lauper
- "Cherry-Coloured Funk" – Cocteau Twins
- "Who Knows" – Natasha Bedingfield
- "Unfair" – Josh Kelley
- "Hips Don't Lie" – Shakira
- "Lady West" – Jamie Scott and The Town
- "The Sky Is Crying" – Albert King
- "Freckle Song" – Chuck Prophet
- "Anna" – Bad Company
- "Bennie and the Jets" – Elton John
- "Under The Influence" – James Morrison
- "Happy Together" – The Turtles
- "Big Bounce" – Dick Lemaine
- "So Here We Are" – Bloc Party
- "Love Has Fallen On Me" – Chaka Khan
- "Be Here Now" – Ray LaMontagne
- "Like a Star" – Corinne Bailey Rae
- "Don't Stop 'Til You Get Enough" - Michael Jackson

== Home media ==
27 Dresses was released on DVD and Blu-ray in the United States on April 29, 2008.
