= The Proposal (2009 film) =

2009 Disney Studios film

- Theatrical release poster
- Directed by: Anne Fletcher
- Written by: Peter Chiarelli
- Produced by: David Hoberman; Todd Lieberman
- Starring: Sandra Bullock; Ryan Reynolds; Malin Åkerman; Craig T. Nelson; Mary Steenburgen; Betty White
- Cinematography: Oliver Stapleton
- Edited by: Priscilla Nedd-Friendly
- Music by: Aaron Zigman
- Production companies: Touchstone Pictures; Kurtzman/Orci Productions; Mandeville Films
- Distributed by: Walt Disney Studios Motion Pictures
- Release dates: June 1, 2009 (El Capitan Theatre); June 19, 2009 (United States)
- Running time: 107 minutes
- Country: United States
- Language: English
- Budget: $40 million
- Box office: $317 million

The Proposal is a 2009 American romantic comedy film directed by Anne Fletcher and written by Peter Chiarelli. It is produced by Kurtzman/Orci Productions, Mandeville Films and Touchstone Pictures for Walt Disney Studios Motion Pictures, and stars Sandra Bullock and Ryan Reynolds in lead roles, alongside Malin Åkerman, Craig T. Nelson, Mary Steenburgen and Betty White in supporting roles. The plot centers on a Canadian executive who learns that she may face deportation from the U.S. because her visa renewal application was denied. Determined to retain her position as editor-in-chief of a publishing house, she convinces her long-suffering personal assistant to temporarily act as her fiancé.

Development began in 2005 when Chiarelli wrote the script. Principal filming occurred from April to May 2008. The film received mixed reviews from critics, who praised the performances and chemistry between Bullock and Reynolds but criticized its screenplay and what was seen as a formulaic plot structure. It was a box office success, grossing over $317 million worldwide on its $40 million budget. Bullock was nominated for the Golden Globe Award for Best Actress – Motion Picture Comedy or Musical.

== Plot ==
Margaret Tate is a Canadian editor-in-chief at a New York City book publishing company, universally disliked by her subordinates for her pushy personality. A visa violation means she is threatened with deportation back to Canada. Not wanting to lose her position and life in New York, Margaret coerces her long-suffering personal assistant, Andrew Paxton, into marrying her so she can get a green card, telling him that her deportation would set back his dream to become an editor.

Suspicious U.S. immigration agent Gilbertson tells the couple that if they are committing fraud, Margaret will be deported permanently and Andrew will be fined $250,000 and may spend five years in prison. Margaret accepts Andrew's conditions that she make him an editor and publish a particular book that he has recommended.

They travel to Andrew's hometown of Sitka, Alaska, to see his parents, Joe and Grace, and his grandmother Annie. Margaret is surprised to discover that the Paxtons are wealthy. At the welcome home party, Margaret meets waiter Ramone and Andrew's ex-girlfriend Gertrude. Andrew's father, Joe, confronts Andrew, saying he is merely using Margaret to get ahead in his career. Andrew immediately announces their engagement.

The next day, Grace and Annie take Margaret to a bar for her bachelorette party, where Ramone is an exotic dancer. Gertrude tells Margaret that the night before their college graduation, Andrew had proposed to her, but she refused as she didn't want to leave Sitka for New York. Margaret overhears Andrew's parents arguing about an ongoing conflict between Andrew and Joe. She asks Andrew but he refuses to talk about it. She confides in him about her own life and they grow closer.

The family convinces Andrew and Margaret to marry the following day. Margaret admits to Andrew that, since her parents died when she was 16, she has forgotten how it feels to have a family. Gilbertson has contacted Joe about the possible fraud, and Joe has flown Gilbertson to Sitka, where Gilbertson offers the couple a deal: If they confess the engagement is a sham, Margaret will simply be deported and neither of them will face further penalties. They refuse, continuing to claim they are in love.

The wedding is officiated by Ramone. It begins normally until Margaret, touched by the closeness of Andrew's family, stops the ceremony and tells everyone the truth. Gilbertson says she has 24 hours to leave for Canada; she returns to the house to pack. Andrew pursues Margaret but she has already gone. He finds a note from her promising to publish the book he discovered before she leaves. Gertrude comforts Andrew as another argument arises between him and Joe. While they argue, Annie appears to have a heart attack. As she and the family are airlifted towards the hospital, she begs Joe and Andrew to reconcile before she dies. Once they agree, she admits she faked the heart attack to catch up with Margaret, and tells the pilot to divert to catch her plane. Margaret's plane takes off just as they arrive. Andrew's parents realize he really loves Margaret.

Andrew arrives at the New York office as Margaret is packing. He tells her he loves her and they kiss. They inform Gilbertson that they are now engaged for real. He exclaims, "Let's do it!" During the end credits, Gilbertson asks Margaret, Andrew, his parents, and Ramone increasingly ridiculous questions.

== Cast ==
- Sandra Bullock as Margaret Tate, editor-in-chief at a major New York City book publisher
- Ryan Reynolds as Andrew Paxton, Margaret's assistant whose ultimate career goal is to become an editor
- Malin Åkerman as Gertrude, Andrew's ex-girlfriend
- Craig T. Nelson as Joe Paxton, Andrew's father, who owns the family businesses that dominate the town of Sitka
- Mary Steenburgen as Grace Paxton, Andrew's mother
- Betty White as Annie Paxton, Andrew's paternal grandmother and Joe's mother
- Oscar Nunez as Ramone, a jack-of-all-trades resident of Sitka who holds many jobs including waiter, male stripper, shopkeeper, and minister
- Denis O'Hare as Mr. Gilbertson, the immigration agent investigating Margaret's case
- Michael Nouri as Chairman Bergen, Tate's superior who is the chairman of the board of directors
- Aasif Mandvi as Bob Spaulding, a fired editor who Tate's superiors plan to rehire if Tate gets deported since he is the only one to match her skills
- Michael Mosley as Chuck, Andrew's friend

== Production ==
=== Development ===
Peter Chiarelli wrote the script for the film in 2005. In May 2007, it was announced that Sandra Bullock had been given a lead role for The Proposal. Julia Roberts was originally approached for the lead but declined. Nearly two months later, it was reported that plans were being finalized for Ryan Reynolds to star opposite Bullock. In January 2008, Touchstone Pictures signed Anne Fletcher to direct.

=== Filming ===
Shooting for The Proposal began on April 2, 2008, in Rockport, Massachusetts. In the days leading up to production, part of the town was remodeled to simulate Sitka, Alaska, the primary setting. Principal photography began on April 9 at Bearskin Neck, and continued for 24 hours. Filming resumed at the Motif Number One building on Bradley Wharf (April 14–16), the Haskins Building (April 15–18), and the central business district of Rockport (April 17). Principal photography relocated to Manchester-by-the-Sea, Massachusetts on April 22, for approximately two weeks. City officials accommodated the producers by renting out all their parking lots. Filming for The Proposal was delayed briefly when Bullock and her husband were involved in a car accident. The wedding scene was filmed in a three-story twentieth century Victorian home; photography at the residence lasted three weeks. In an interview with The New York Times, the homeowners stated that Nelson Coates knocked on their door asking for leaves. The owners directed Coates to other residences but eventually gave the producer a tour of the house. Production occurred on the first floor of the home. Outside of the Cape Ann area, filming took place in Boston, Massachusetts, at the State Street Bank Building and in Lower Manhattan in New York City. The Proposal contained 350 special effect shots, with some parts edited using computer-generated imagery. The score for The Proposal was composed by Aaron Zigman, who recorded it with the Hollywood Studio Symphony at the Sony Scoring Stage.

=== Post-production ===
As part of an extensive promotional campaign, Reynolds discussed his participation in a nude scene. Expressing that she had been initially nervous, Bullock stated in an interview with Sky News that "when everyone else acts like it's just a normal day it really helps you relax." Although she said that producers had provided them with fig leaves, Bullock stated that they would continuously fall off. She added, "You could literally see everything." Similar sentiments were expressed by Reynolds, who in an interview with People, stated, "Filming a scene that involves being entirely naked and takes a couple days can be a little awkward." He continued: "Thankfully you're there for so long and you're doing it for so long that you dispense with the awkwardness pretty quickly and start to have mundane, normal conversations – the difference being you're not wearing pants."

== Release ==
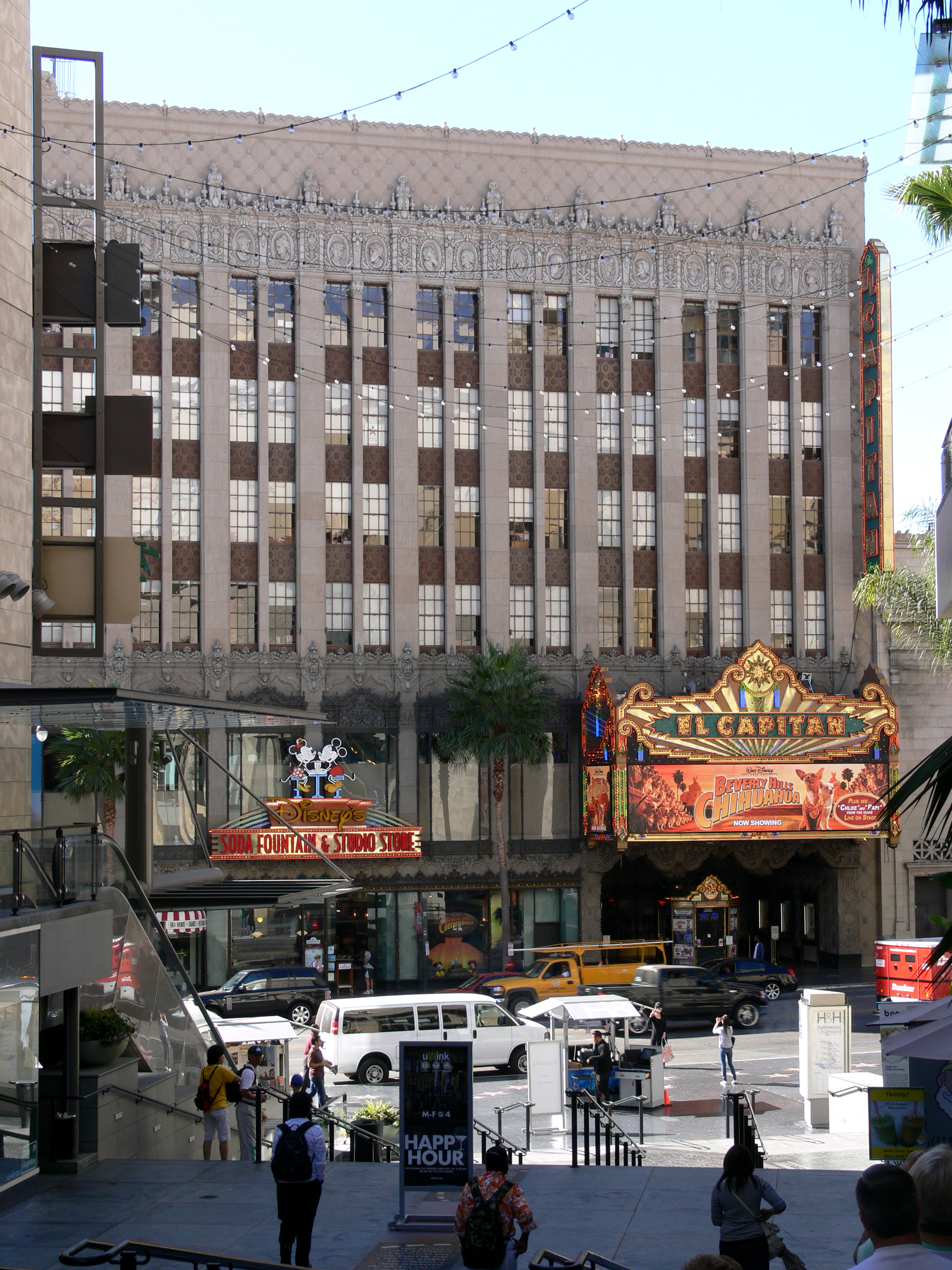
The Proposal premiered at the El Capitan Theatre in Hollywood, California.

The film premiered on June 1, 2009, at the El Capitan Theatre in Hollywood, California, and was released to theaters on June 19, 2009.

=== Home media ===
The Proposal was released by Touchstone Home Entertainment on DVD and Blu-ray on October 13, 2009. It sold over 2.4 million units within its first week, translating to an addition of $39.3 million in the box office. In its second week, sales numbers declined by 70% to 623,744 units, ranking second among DVD sales of the week. By July 2013, The Proposal had sold over 5.6 million units and earned over $90 million in sales.

== Reception ==
=== Box office ===
The Proposal was released in the United States on June 19, 2009. On its opening day, it grossed an estimated $12.7 million in 3,056 theaters, becoming the highest-grossing film of the day. It went on to gross over $34 million on its opening weekend, beating Year One, Up, and The Hangover. In an exit poll conducted by Disney, nearly 63% of the opening audience consisted of female viewers, 78% were eighteen or older, and 71% were classified as couples. It was the biggest opening weekend of any film in Bullock's career, nearly doubling her previous record, Premonition. As of October 2011, the film had grossed over $164 million in the United States and Canada.

Box office performances showed similar numbers in international markets. The film was released in Australia on June 18, 2009, grossing over $2.8 million on its opening weekend. In Russia, the film grossed over $2.6 million on its opening weekend, accounting for 34% of all total film revenue in that country. In South Africa the film debuted at number two, losing out to the new release Ice Age: Dawn of the Dinosaurs. It managed to gross over $2.6 million as of October 2011. In the United Kingdom, estimated first opening weekend grosses stand at $5.3 million. The film has grossed over $317 million worldwide, with international grosses standing at $153 million. It is the twenty-first highest-grossing film of 2009.

=== Critical reception ===
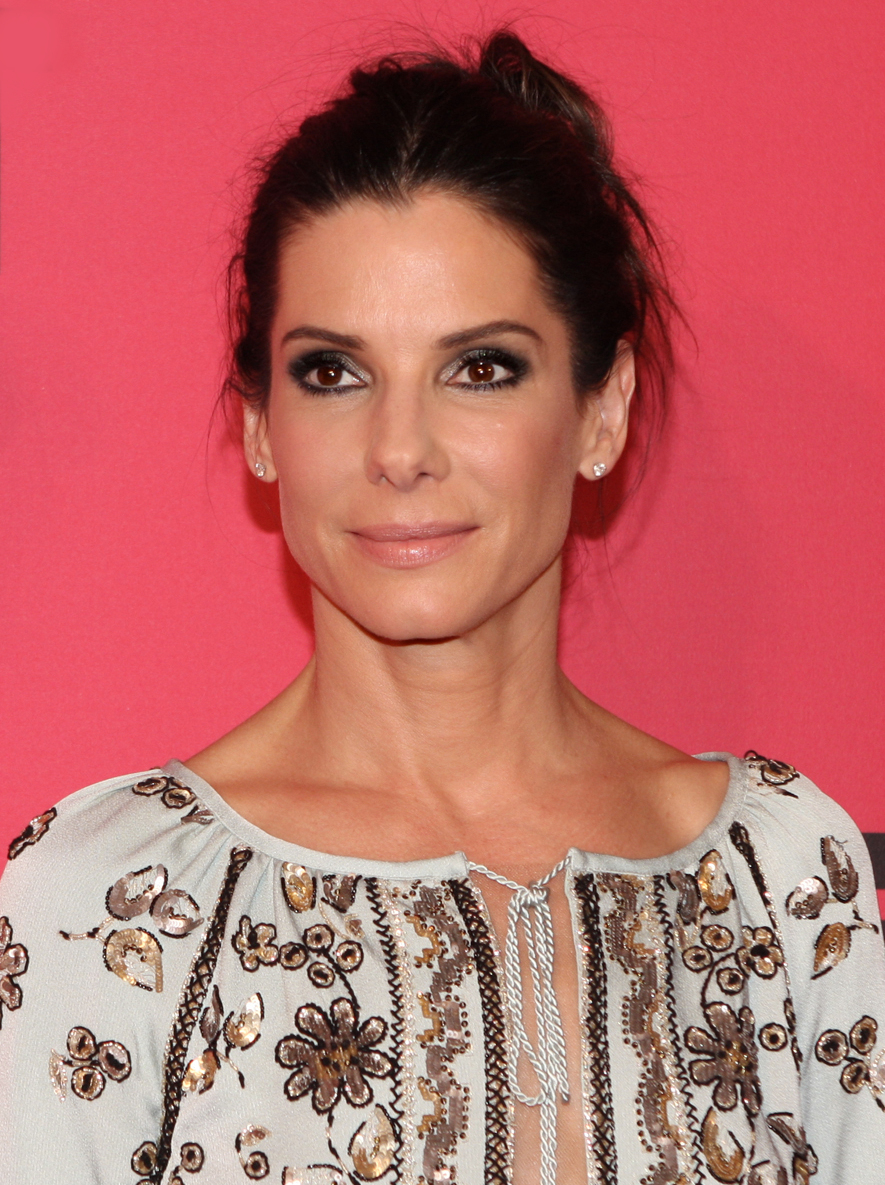
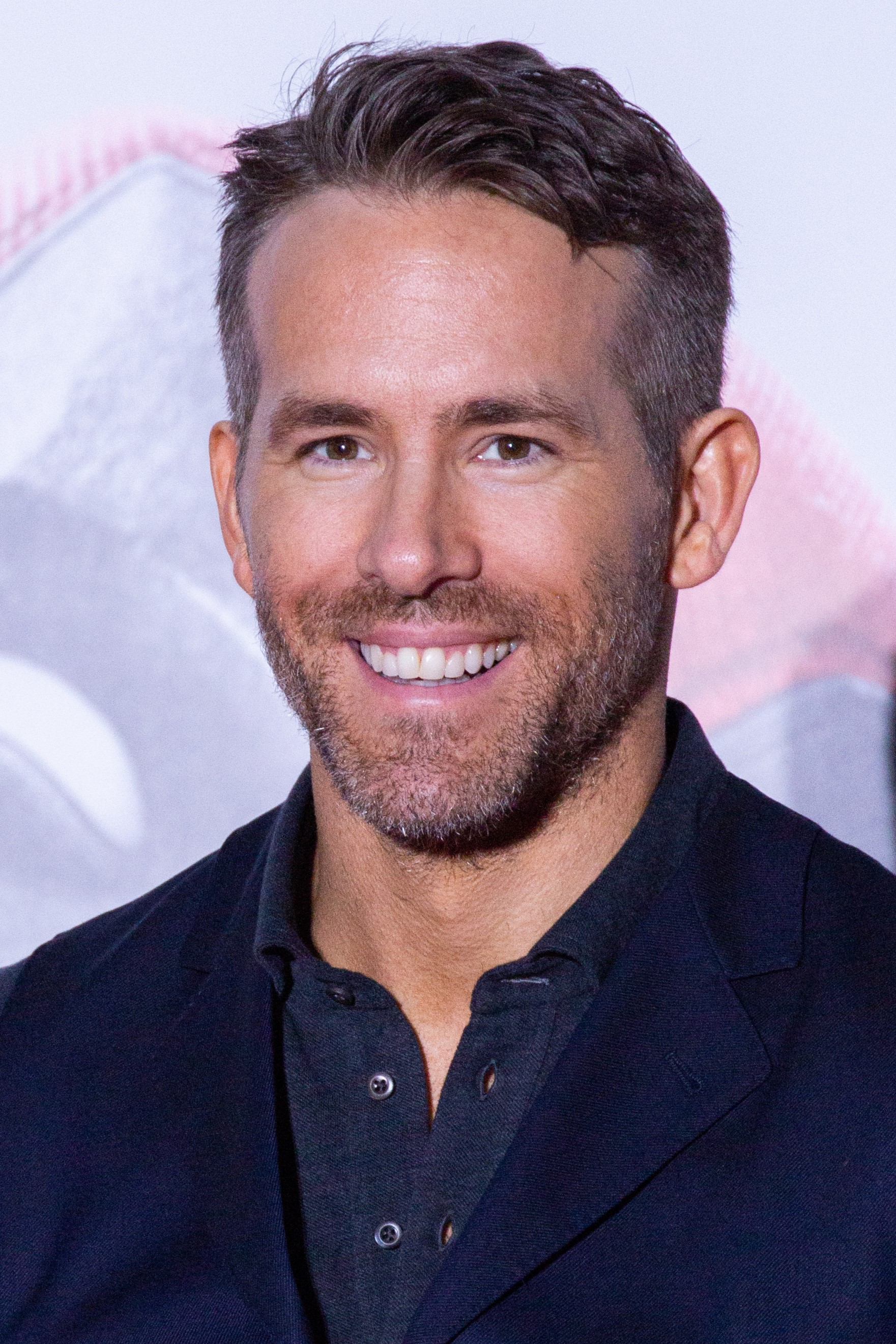
Despite the film's mixed reviews, critics praised the performances and chemistry between Sandra Bullock (left) and Ryan Reynolds (right).

On review aggregation website Rotten Tomatoes, the film has an approval rating of 45% based on 187 reviews, with an average rating of 5.32/10. The site's critical consensus reads: "Sandra Bullock and Ryan Reynolds exhibit plenty of chemistry, but they're let down by The Proposal's devotion to formula." On Metacritic, which assigns a weighted average rating, the film has a score of 48 out of 100, based on 30 reviews from critics, indicating "mixed or average reviews". Audiences polled by CinemaScore gave the film an average grade of "A−" on an A+ to F scale.

Roger Ebert of the Chicago Sun-Times offered a positive review, giving the film three out of four stars despite complaining that the film "recycles a plot that was already old when Tracy and Hepburn were trying it out" but adding he was eventually won over by the performances. Peter Travers of Rolling Stone was very critical of the film, calling it insipid. He wrote, "Anne Fletcher directs Peter Chiarelli's script like a manufacturer of hard plastic that is guaranteed to ward off intrusion from all recognizable human emotion." New York Times writer Manohla Dargis felt that Bullock's character was awkward in comparison to her previous work. She continued: "She's always been better in fundamentally independent roles that allow her to grab the wheel [...] and take the spotlight [...], an independence that persists all the way through the last-act coupling. She can smile as brightly at a man as well as the next leading lady, though, like all genuinely big female stars, she's really more of a solo act." The Telegraph's Tim Robey expressed disappointment towards the film, giving it a two out of five stars.

It's saying a lot about this section [...] that its comic highlight is Bullock having her mobile phone stolen by a passing eagle, and proffering the family's puppy by way of exchange. In fairness, the leads get very naked before they strictly intend to, and the sound department notches up at least one big laugh with the wettest slap you've ever heard when they unexpectedly collide [...]. But the more recurrent noise towards the end was me groaning with disappointment, that a movie which had struck gold with its central matchmaking was succeeding so ruthlessly in taking the shine off. On the plus side, it's done great business, so we might get to see Bullock and Reynolds back in something soon.

— Tim Robey of The Telegraph

The interaction between Bullock and Reynolds was well received by critics. Lisa Schwarzbaum of Entertainment Weekly opined that the chemistry between the two actors was "fresh and irresistible." Zorianna Kit of The Huffington Post exclaimed that "what [kept] audiences of this lite-fare comedy in their seats is the undeniable on-screen chemistry between leads Sandra Bullock and Ryan Reynolds." She continued: "The two are so adept at comedy and have so much fun with one another, viewers watching The Proposal won't be able to resist their charms, even when some of the plot veers into unnecessarily silliness." Betsey Sharkley of the Los Angeles Times felt that their relationship was a "cheeky update of The Taming of the Shrew." She opined, "Bullock's deft physical comedy, one of her most endearing qualities, is given a full run. [...] Reynolds' ability to deliver a line, or a look, with withering, surgical precision is there at every turn." Giving it one out of five stars, The Guardian writer Peter Bradshaw gave a negative reaction to the interaction between Bullock and Reynolds. Bradshaw stated: "Their initial sparky detestation isn't convincing, and neither is their later thawing and romance. In each scene, it looks as if they have never met before. And Margaret isn't permitted to be a convincing cow, because that would make her unsympathetic [...]. Andrew can't be a total wimp, because that would be unsexy, so the fundamental comic premises of the film are fudged."

=== Accolades ===
List of awards and nominations
Award	Category	Recipients	Result
15th Broadcast Film Critics Association Awards	Best Comedy Film		Nominated
67th Golden Globe Awards	Best Actress – Motion Picture Comedy or Musical	Sandra Bullock	Nominated
2010 Kids' Choice Awards	Blimp Award for Favorite Movie Actress (along with The Blind Side)	Sandra Bullock	Nominated
2010 MTV Movie Awards	Best Comedic Performance	Sandra Bullock	Nominated
2010 MTV Movie Awards	Best Comedic Performance	Ryan Reynolds	Nominated
2010 MTV Movie Awards	Best Kiss	Sandra Bullock & Ryan Reynolds	Nominated
2010 MTV Movie Awards	Best WTF Moment	Betty White	Nominated
36th People's Choice Awards	Favorite Comedy Movie		Won
36th People's Choice Awards	Favorite On-Screen Team	Sandra Bullock & Ryan Reynolds	Nominated
36th People's Choice Awards	Favorite Movie		Nominated
14th Satellite Awards	Best Actress – Motion Picture Musical or Comedy	Sandra Bullock	Nominated
2010 Teen Choice Awards	Choice Movie Dance	Sandra Bullock & Betty White	Won
2010 Teen Choice Awards	Choice Scene Stealer – Female	Betty White	Nominated
2010 Teen Choice Awards	Choice Movie Chemistry	Sandra Bullock & Ryan Reynolds	Nominated
2010 Teen Choice Awards	Choice Movie Liplock	Sandra Bullock & Ryan Reynolds	Nominated
2010 Teen Choice Awards	Choice Movie – Romantic Comedy		Nominated
2010 Teen Choice Awards	Choice Movie Actress – Romantic Comedy	Sandra Bullock	Won
2010 Teen Choice Awards	Choice Movie Actor – Romantic Comedy	Ryan Reynolds	Nominated
2009 Teen Choice Awards	Choice Summer Movie – Romance		Won
2009 Teen Choice Awards	Choice Summer Movie Star – Female	Sandra Bullock	Nominated
2009 Teen Choice Awards	Choice Summer Movie Star – Male	Ryan Reynolds	Nominated

== Remakes ==
=== Indian remakes ===
It was loosely remade into the following :

- The Malayalam titled My Boss (2012),
- The Kannada titled Software Ganda (2014) and
- The Tamil titled Sandakkari (2026).

=== Chinese remake ===
- A Chinese remake co-produced by Walt Disney Pictures and Linmon Pictures, and directed by Yee Chin-yen, was announced in June 2016.

=== Other languages ===
- The Iranian remake is titled To va Man (2011).
