= Rescue Ink Unleashed =

2009 American reality television series

- Also known as: Rescue Ink
- Country of origin: United States
- Original language: English
- No. of seasons: 1
- No. of episodes: 6

Production
- Running time: 60 minutes (with commercials)

Original release
- Network: National Geographic Channel
- Release: September 25, 2009

Rescue Ink Unleashed is a reality television series that premiered on September 25, 2009, on the National Geographic Channel. The series features a Long Island-based animal welfare organization, called Rescue Ink. The group is made up of heavily tattooed motorcycle riders who work to combat animal cruelty and rescue animals in need. The group states they use aggressive and "in-your-face" tactics, to put to shame and report abusive animal owners. The group takes action to remove distressed animals from their environments, taking them to no-kill shelters or rehabilitation facilities. They abandoned the Long Beach Animal Shelter leaving the volunteers behind to care for the animals.

The initial cast members went by the names Joe Panz, Big Ant, Johnny O, Eric, G, Angel, Des "the cat man" Junior, Robert, Den Mom Mary and Batso, the 75-year-old eldest member of the group.
