= The Guilt Trip (film) =

- Theatrical release poster
- Directed by: Anne Fletcher
- Written by: Dan Fogelman
- Produced by: Lorne Michaels; John Goldwyn; Evan Goldberg
- Starring: Barbra Streisand; Seth Rogen
- Cinematography: Oliver Stapleton
- Edited by: Dana E. Glauberman; Priscilla Nedd-Friendly
- Music by: Christophe Beck
- Production companies: Michaels/Goldwyn; Skydance Productions
- Distributed by: Paramount Pictures
- Release date: December 19, 2012
- Running time: 95 minutes
- Country: United States
- Language: English
- Budget: $40 million
- Box office: $41.9 million

The Guilt Trip is a 2012 American road comedy film directed by Anne Fletcher, written by Dan Fogelman, and starring Barbra Streisand and Seth Rogen, who both also served as executive producers on the film. The film focuses on Andy Brewster, an inventor who goes on a cross-country trip to try to sell the non-toxic cleaning product he developed, inviting his mother to join him as well. Unbeknownst to her, he wants them to meet an old flame of hers.

The Guilt Trip was released by Paramount Pictures on December 19, 2012, received mixed reviews from critics, and grossed $41.9 million on a production budget of $40 million.

== Plot ==
Andy Brewster is a UCLA-graduate organic chemist and inventor. He wants to get his environmentally friendly cleaning product, ScieoClean, in a major retail store. However his sales pitches fall on deaf ears.

He visits his mother, Joyce Brewster, in New Jersey before leaving on a cross-country trip to Las Vegas, lying that a pitch to K-Mart went well so she will not worry.

While still in New Jersey, his mother reveals that he was named after Andrew Margolis, a boy she fell in love with in Florida, who she hoped would object to her marriage with Andy's father. However, he did not, making her feel she had never mattered to him. After a little research, he finds Andrew Margolis is alive, unmarried and living in San Francisco. He invites his unknowing mother on the trip, saying he wants to spend some time with her.

The road trip quickly becomes hard for Andy as his mother meddles in his life. After their car breaks down in Tennessee, Joyce calls Andy's ex-girlfriend Jessica, whom she insists he should get back together with, to pick them up. At a pregnant and married Jessica's house, she reveals that Andy proposed to her before college, and she turned him down, shocking Joyce.

Andy is glum afterward, and Joyce apologizes for calling Jessica, which he half-heartedly accepts. In Texas, he meets with Costco executive Ryan McFee. Joyce stays at the meeting, criticizing the product's labeling and name along with Ryan until Andy snaps at him. At a motel that night, a depressed Andy begins drinking, and Joyce attempts to make up with him. He gets angry, only to have her snap back and leave for a bar. Later, Andy attempts to retrieve Joyce and gets in a fight with a bar patron over her, receiving a black eye in the process.

At a steak restaurant the next day, the two exchange apologies, and Andy reveals that he is failing at selling ScieoClean. Joyce enters a steak-eating challenge and is noticed by cowboy-businessman Ben Graw, who gives her tips to help her finish the challenge.

Afterwards, Ben reveals he does business in New York and asks her to dinner. Joyce, who has not been in a relationship since Andy's dad died years before, balks at the offer, so Ben merely leaves his number and asks her to call if she reconsiders.

Andy and Joyce begin to genuinely enjoy each other's company afterwards, taking time to visit the Grand Canyon (which Joyce has always wanted to see), and having other adventures.

In Las Vegas, Joyce has such a good time that she suggests Andy leave her while he visits San Francisco, forcing him to reveal that he chose the city so she could meet Andrew Margolis. Joyce is very distraught, having believed Andy solely invited her to spend time with her.

Andy makes his pitch at the Home Shopping Network but finds that his science-based pitch bores the executives. Seeing Joyce, he takes her advice by talking about family safety, and drinking a large amount of it to prove his product will not harm children. The CEO shows genuine interest in selling ScieoClean on the Network. Jubilant, Andy and Joyce decide to visit Andrew Margolis's house.

When they arrive, they meet Andrew's son, Andrew Margolis Jr., whom Andy mistook for the father. He reveals that his father died five years ago. Seeing Joyce's grief, he invites them inside. She asks if Andrew's father ever mentioned her, but he says he never did as he only confided personal information to their mother, who is in Florida.

Andrew then introduces his sister, who is also named Joyce. Joyce is overjoyed, believing that you name your children after someone you cherished and want to remember. This makes her believe that she mattered to Andrew.

Afterwards, they part ways at the San Francisco Airport: Andy to make his next sales pitch and Joyce back to New Jersey, where she arranges a date with Ben Graw. The two leave content, and much closer than they had been.

== Cast ==
- Barbra Streisand as Joyce Brewster
- Seth Rogen as Andrew "Andy" Brewster
- Brett Cullen as Benjamin Graw
- Adam Scott as Andrew Margolis, Jr.
- Ari Graynor as Joyce Margolis
- Casey Wilson as Amanda Darlingson
- Colin Hanks as Rob O'Farrell
- Yvonne Strahovski as Jessica
- Jeff Kober as Jimmy
- Miriam Margolyes as Anita
- Kathy Najimy as Gayle
- Rose Abdoo as Diana
- Dale Dickey as Tammy
- Nora Dunn as Amy
- Brandon Keener as Ryan McFee
- Danny Pudi as Sanjay
- Rick Gonzalez as Mark
- Zabryna Guevara as K-Mart Executive
- Robert Curtis Brown as K-Mart Executive
- Tom Virtue as Mature Singles Man
- Steve Tom as OSH Executive
- Creed Bratton as Suitor
- Michael Cassidy as Fake Andy
- Eddie Shin as Chris Chung
- Amanda Walsh as Lisa

== Production ==
"I've met her only a couple of times so far but she's really funny and nice and really reminds me a lot of my actual mother, which is very odd; my girlfriend's like a huge Barbra Streisand fan."

— Seth Rogen on Barbra Streisand.

The film is based on a real-life trip by screenwriter Fogelman and his mother from New Jersey to Las Vegas years before. The film completed production in late spring or early summer (May–July) 2011 under the working title My Mother's Curse. In late 2011, the film was renamed The Guilt Trip. It was released December 19, 2012.

This film marks Streisand's first starring role since The Mirror Has Two Faces in 1996. She appeared in supporting roles in Meet the Fockers in 2004 and Little Fockers in 2010.

== Release ==
=== Box office ===
The Guilt Trip grossed $5.3 million in its opening weekend, coming in at No. 6. It ultimately grossed $37.1 million in the US and $4.7 million elsewhere, for a total of $41.9 million worldwide.

== Reception ==
=== Critical response ===
On Rotten Tomatoes the film has an approval rating of 35% based on 124 reviews, with an average rating of 5.10/10. The website's critical consensus states: "Seth Rogen and Barbra Streisand have enough chemistry to drive a solidly assembled comedy; unfortunately, The Guilt Trip has a lemon of a script and is perilously low on comedic fuel." On Metacritic, the film has a weighted average score of 50 out of 100, based on 25 critics, indicating "mixed or average reviews". Audiences surveyed by CinemaScore gave the film a grade "B−" on scale of A to F.

Mary Pols of Time stated, "The Guilt Trip works because we all know and like a Joyce Brewster (or dozens of them)". At the 33rd Golden Raspberry Awards, Streisand was nominated for Worst Actress, where she lost to Kristen Stewart for both Snow White and the Huntsman and The Twilight Saga: Breaking Dawn – Part 2.
