= Hot Pursuit (2015 film) =

- Theatrical release poster
- Directed by: Anne Fletcher
- Written by: David Feeney; John Quaintance
- Produced by: Dana Fox; Bruna Papandrea; Reese Witherspoon; Sarah Swick
- Starring: Reese Witherspoon; Sofía Vergara; John Carroll Lynch; Robert Kazinsky
- Cinematography: Oliver Stapleton
- Edited by: Priscilla Nedd-Friendly
- Music by: Christophe Beck
- Production companies: New Line Cinema; Metro-Goldwyn-Mayer Pictures; Pacific Standard
- Distributed by: Warner Bros. Pictures
- Release date: May 8, 2015
- Running time: 87 minutes
- Country: United States
- Language: English
- Budget: $35 million
- Box office: $51.4 million

Hot Pursuit is a 2015 American action comedy film produced by New Line Cinema, Metro-Goldwyn-Mayer Pictures, and Pacific Standard and distributed by Warner Bros. Pictures. The film was directed by Anne Fletcher, from a screenplay written by David Feeney and John Quaintance, and stars Reese Witherspoon and Sofía Vergara. The story follows a straight-laced police officer assigned to protect the capricious widow of a drug boss's lieutenant from corrupt cops and criminals who want her dead as they race through Texas to avoid detection.

Hot Pursuit was released on May 8, 2015. It received negative reviews from critics, and grossed $51.4 million worldwide against a budget of $35 million.

== Plot ==
Rose Cooper is a San Antonio Police Department officer whose work ethic is too intense. Following an incident in which Cooper sets the mayor's son on fire by tasering him while he carried an alcoholic drink (after he yelled "shotgun!"), her ineptness in the field has her assigned to the evidence locker.

Cooper's commanding officer, Captain Emmett, gives her a secret assignment to join U.S. Marshal Jackson, protecting Felipe Riva and his wife Daniella. Riva must testify against cartel leader Vicente Cortez. At the Riva home, a pair of masked assassins and a different pair of assassins kill Jackson and Felipe while Cooper and Daniella are upstairs. Daniella grabs one suitcase, containing many pairs of shoes, and the women flee in Riva's car. When Daniella later tries to run off, Cooper handcuffs herself to her.

They are found by Cooper's fellow officers Dixon and Hauser. Cooper realizes the officers are one of the assassin teams when she sees the Longhorn tattoo. They escape and head for Dallas, where Daniella can testify against Cortez.

The women learn Cooper is now labeled a fugitive fleeing with Daniella. A tractor-trailer plows into the car, spraying hidden cocaine everywhere. Cooper gets the truck driver to drop them at a store, where Daniella and the very high Cooper change their clothes. When the assassins show up, they stow away in a horse trailer hooked to a pickup truck. When the truck stops, Cooper tries to steal it, but the owner, Red, reappears with a gun. She and Daniella flee, find another pickup, and drive away.

The ladies continue bonding, with Cooper admitting her rigid, by-the-books nature has made it difficult to meet a man. They are surprised to find a man named Randy sleeping in the back of the pickup. He is a felon with an ankle bracelet for viciously assaulting his sisters' abusive boyfriends. Cooper agrees to take off the bracelet in exchange for Randy's help. Daniella is pleased to see Randy flirting with Cooper.

Daniella explains her bag of shoes is covered with $4 million in real diamonds, revealing Cortez's money laundering method. When Dixon and Hauser appear and shoot at them, Randy attacks Hauser, allowing the women to run.

The women hitch a ride on a tour bus until Dixon and Hauser catch up to them on the road. Taking the wheel, they shoot at the crooked cops, and they end up running the men off the road. After they succeed, Daniella knocks out Cooper in a single punch.

Cooper wakes up and sees Daniella talking to the assassins who were also chasing them. We discover she is working with the assassins to murder Cortez as revenge for killing her brother. Additionally, she was not going to testify in Dallas, but instead hired the men to 'kidnap' her before she was escorted out of her house. She leaves Cooper, going with the men to take down Vincente Cortez.

Soon after, Cooper is cleared of any wrongdoing after explaining what happened. Captain Emmett advises her to let the FBI take care of Cortez, but she ignores him.

Sneaking into Cortez's daughter's quinceañera as a man to get close to Daniella, Cooper tries to get Daniella to wear a wire to get Cortez's confession to her brother's murder. A woman walking into the bathroom mistakes Cooper for a pervert and throws her out. Getting back into the party and running into Emmett, she learns he is working for Cortez. He pulls a gun on her, but Cooper pours alcohol on him and tases him so he catches fire.

Daniella corners Cortez and reveals her intentions to kill him. Cooper arrives and stops her, but when he draws a gun, Cooper shoots him dead.

Three months later, Daniella is released from prison, and Cooper picks her up and transports her out. She surprises Daniella with her old pairs of very valuable shoes. She also reveals that Randy is in the car with her, and Daniella likes Cooper's new "wild side" as they drive off together.

== Cast ==
- Reese Witherspoon as Officer Rose Cooper
- Sofía Vergara as Daniella Riva
- Robert Kazinsky as Randy
- Matthew Del Negro as Detective Hauser
- Michael Mosley as Detective Dixon
- Richard T. Jones as U.S. Marshall Jackson
- Benny Nieves as Jesus
- Michael Ray Escamilla as Angel
- Joaquín Cosío as Vicente Cortez
- Carol Sutton as Brenda
- John Carroll Lynch as Captain Emmett
- Jim Gaffigan as Red
- Mike Birbiglia as Steve
- Vincent Laresca as Felipe Riva
- David Jensen as Wayne
- Evaluna Montaner as Teresa Cortez
- Bryce Romero as Cooper's prom date

== Production and marketing ==
The film was originally titled Don't Mess with Texas. Principal photography began on May 12, 2014, in New Orleans, Louisiana, and was set to last for two months. The film's first trailer was released on February 12, 2015.

== Release ==
Hot Pursuit released in theaters on May 8, 2015. It was then released on Digital Download on July 28, 2015, and the DVD and Blu-ray were released on August 11, 2015.

== Reception ==
=== Box office ===
Hot Pursuit grossed $34.6 million in the US and Canada, and $16.9 million in other territories, for a worldwide total of $51.5 million.

In its opening weekend, the film grossed $13.9 million, finishing second at the box office behind Avengers: Age of Ultron, which was in its second week ($77.7 million).

=== Critical response ===
On Rotten Tomatoes, Hot Pursuit has an approval rating of 8% based on 179 reviews, with an average rating of 3.17/10. The website's critical consensus reads, "Shrill and unfunny, Hot Pursuit bungles what should have been an easy opportunity to showcase Reese Witherspoon and Sofia Vergara's likable odd-couple chemistry." On Metacritic, the film has a score of 31 out of 100 based on 36 critics, indicating "generally unfavorable" reviews. Audiences polled by CinemaScore gave the film a grade of "C+" on an A+ to F scale.

Peter Travers of Rolling Stone gave it 1 out of 4 stars and wrote: "It's all stupefyingly unfunny. Hot Pursuit is one hot mess." Richard Roeper of the Chicago Sun-Times called it "proof two females can make a bickering-opposites-action-comedy that’s just as lousy and sour as any clunker starring two guys."

Stephanie Zacharek of The Village Voice gave the film a positive review, with particular praise for the editing: "Hot Pursuit is a quiet triumph of tone and timing. Nearly every scene is cut at just the right point, often topped off with a fantastic kicker of dialogue."

=== Accolades ===
Actresses received four nominations at the Teen Choice Awards for performances in this film. Reese Witherspoon received two nominations, Choice Movie Actress: Comedy and Choice Movie: Hissy Fit. Reese Witherspoon and Sofía Vergara also received two nominations as a pair, for Choice Movie: Chemistry and Choice Movie: Liplock.
