= Joe Tremaine =

American dancer, choreographer, and dance teacher

- Born: 1938 (age 87–88); Oak Ridge, Louisiana, U.S.
- Occupations: Dancer, choreographer, dance teacher
- Years active: 1950s–present
- Known for: Co-founder of Tremaine Dance Conventions and Competitions

Joe Tremaine (born 1938) is an American dancer, choreographer and dance teacher whose career has spanned stage, film, television and dance education. He co-founded Tremaine Dance Conventions and Competitions in 1981 and became known for teaching and popularizing West Coast jazz.

== Early life and career ==
Tremaine was born in Oak Ridge, Louisiana, in 1938 and began taking dance classes as a child. After attending college, he trained and performed with the New Orleans Ballet Association and the New Orleans Opera before moving to New York City.

He later performed in Europe with entertainer Caterina Valente. Choreographer June Taylor cast him as one of eight male dancers on The Jackie Gleason Show, and he also appeared in television specials hosted by Ed Sullivan.

In 1967, he moved to Los Angeles after being engaged as a lead dancer on The Jerry Lewis Show. His film work also included the 1969 musical Hello, Dolly!.

== Teaching career ==
During the 1970s, Tremaine opened the Joe Tremaine Dance Center in California and operated the studio for nearly 30 years. The studio primarily taught adult dancers. Dance educator Jackie Sleight later recalled that she and Tremaine opened a studio together in North Hollywood before she left the partnership. He later taught performers including Diana Ross, Goldie Hawn, Barry Manilow and Cameron Diaz.

Tremaine co-founded Tremaine Dance Conventions and Competitions in 1981 and later served as president of the organization.

Dancer and choreographer Maria Callil recalled in a 1995 interview that Tremaine awarded her a two-year scholarship to study at his studio after seeing her take class.

Jacqueline Nalett associated Tremaine's teaching with styles known as West Coast jazz or L.A. jazz, describing it as fast, rhythmically driven and responsive to current musical trends. Guarino wrote that his signature style drew on street-dance influences, freestyle movement and music.

Tremaine publicly supported the creation of a Los Angeles dance-medicine center in 2007, describing it as beneficial to both professional and amateur dancers.

By 2014, the convention circuit toured approximately 25 cities annually and taught about 50,000 dancers nationwide.

The organization marked its 35th anniversary in 2016 with a documentary, a commemorative book and a gala.

== Recognition ==
Jazz Dance L.A. presented Tremaine with a lifetime achievement award in 2002. The program included a video tribute to his career and a restaging of his 1979 work ZZYZX.

The Industry Dance Awards honored him with its Lifetime Achievement Award in 2013.

Four years later, Dance Teacher presented Tremaine with its Award of Distinction and described him as an innovator of West Coast jazz.

The University of Arizona awarded him an honorary Doctor of Fine Arts in 2022.

A 2024 Los Angeles Jazz Company tribute included Tremaine's work Crazy Rhythm. Reviewing the performance, L.A. Dance Chronicle described him as one of the notable jazz teachers and choreographers of his era.
