= Anne Fletcher =

American film director and choreographer (born 1966)

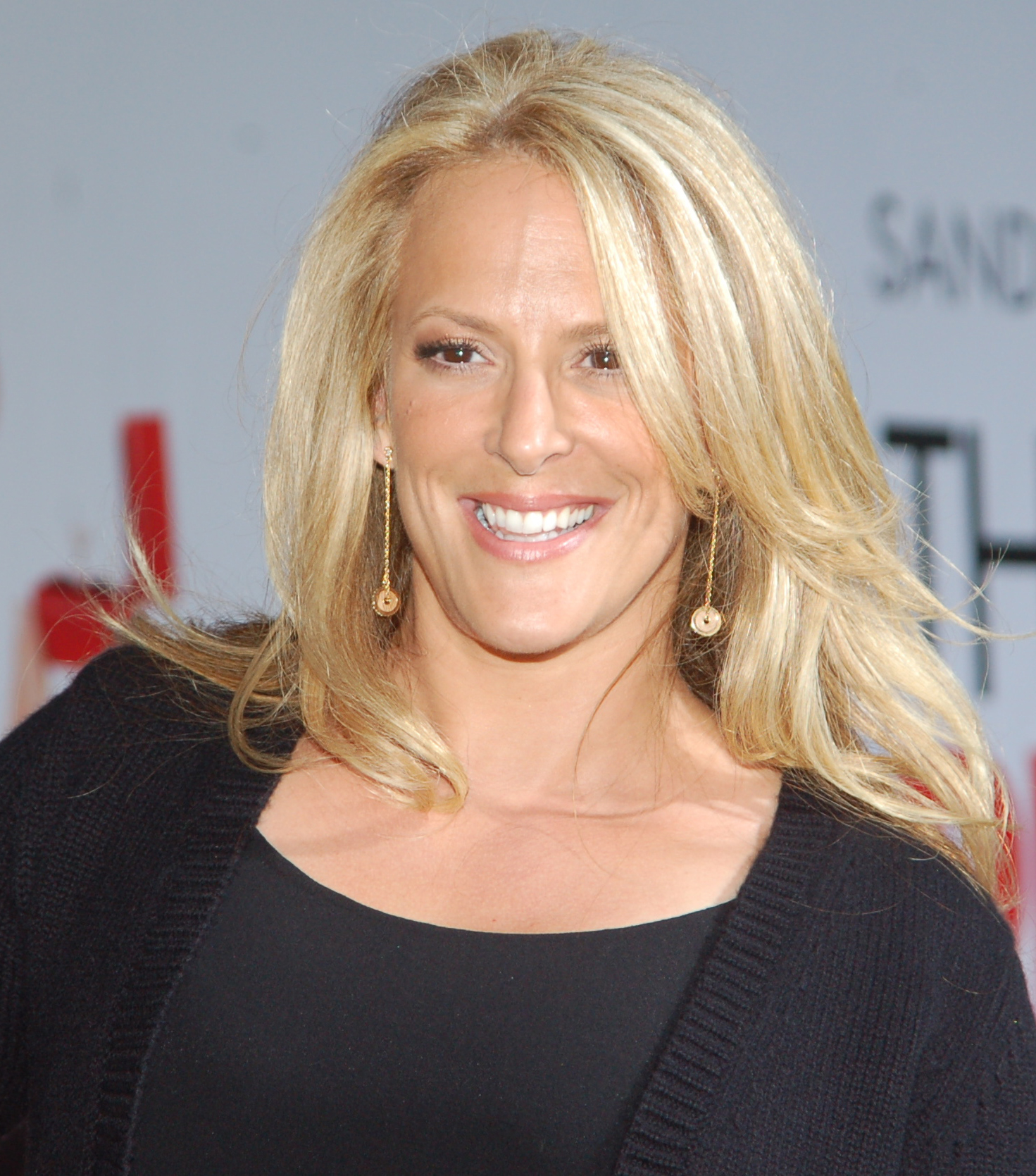
- Fletcher at the June 2009 premiere for The Proposal
- Born: May 1, 1966 (age 60); Detroit, Michigan, U.S.
- Other names: Anne Marie Fletcher; Anne "Mama" Fletcher
- Occupations: Filmmaker; dancer; actress
- Years active: 1990–present

Anne Fletcher (born May 1, 1966) is an American choreographer, film director, dancer and actress. She directed the films Step Up (2006), 27 Dresses (2008), The Proposal (2009), The Guilt Trip (2012), Hot Pursuit (2015), Dumplin' (2018), and Hocus Pocus 2 (2022).

== Early life ==
Born Anne Marie Fletcher in Detroit, Michigan, Fletcher lived with her family in the local lakefront suburb of St. Clair Shores, Michigan until her 1984 graduation with honors from Lake Shore High School. Fletcher began taking dance lessons at a local dance studio, Turning Point School of the Performing Arts, at age 12 after watching her mother take a dance class. At age 15, she appeared in the local show Salute to the Superstars at the now-defunct Mr. F's Beef & Bourbon dinner club in Sterling Heights, Michigan. Upon graduation from high school, Fletcher moved to Los Angeles, California, where she received further training from renowned choreographer Joe Tremaine, and began working as a professional dancer; including performing as a Laker Girl.

== Career ==
=== Choreographic career ===
In 1990, Fletcher met Adam Shankman when they were hired to perform as dancers at the 62nd Academy Awards. Shortly thereafter, Shankman hired Fletcher to become his assistant choreographer. This sparked a longtime personal friendship and professional affiliation.

Fletcher worked closely with Shankman both during his career as a choreographer and later as a film director and has credited her collaborations with Shankman for allowing her to both develop her own set of choreographic and film directorial skills and to achieve a similarly successful career path.

In her first film roles, Fletcher appeared as a dancer, including The Flintstones (1994), The Mask (1994), Tank Girl (1995), Casper (1995) and Titanic (1997). Fletcher later developed choreography for the Oscar-nominated drama film Boogie Nights (1997) starring Mark Wahlberg, Burt Reynolds, Julianne Moore and Heather Graham, in which she also appeared as a dancer, as well as for the comedy film A Life Less Ordinary (1997) with Ewan McGregor and Cameron Diaz.

=== Directorial career ===
After acquiring numerous professional choreography credits, often in collaboration with Adam Shankman, Fletcher, with encouragement from Shankman, began to consider a directorial career. She worked alongside Shankman, who himself had moved from choreography to directing with films such as Hairspray (2007) and The Wedding Planner, for both of which she was an associate producer, as well as Step Up.

Although Fletcher began to break into the production side of filmmaking throughout the early 2000s, she continued to choreograph in films such as the Ice Princess and The Pacifier in 2005. She also did choreograph work in other films like Scooby-Doo 2: Monsters Unleashed (2004), The 40-Year-Old Virgin (2005) and Hairspray (2007).

Fletcher directed the 2006 romantic dance film, Step Up starring Channing Tatum and Jenna Dewan. The film was nominated for two Teen Choice Awards (2007) and one Young Artist Award (2007). Fletcher turned down the offer to direct the sequel to this film, fearing that if she directed another dance film, she would not be able to branch out into other genres in the future. Although she did the choreography on Step Up 2: The Streets (2008), the role of director was given to Jon M. Chu. Panned by critics, the film was well-received by audiences and grossed $65 million at the domestic box office.

Her work on Step Up earned Fletcher a second successful director credit on the popular 2008 romantic comedy film, 27 Dresses, starring Katherine Heigl and James Marsden. This film was nominated for eight awards: one People's Choice Awards (2008), two Teen Choice Awards (2008), three Golden Trailer Awards (2008), one Artios Award (2008) and one EDA Special Mention Award. 27 Dresses is celebrated as an iconic 21st-century romantic comedy film, thanks in large part to Fletcher's directing. Former president of MGM Jonathan Glickman emphasized how important Fletcher was to the success of the film, stating that she and the main character are very similar people. The writer of the film, Aline Brosh McKenna, mentioned in an interview that Fletcher was known on set as "Mama", and credits her for capturing the story so well.

Based on the success of her first two features, Fletcher went on to direct the popular 2009 romantic comedy film, The Proposal, starring Sandra Bullock and Ryan Reynolds. This film was nominated for twenty-seven awards; out of the twenty-seven nominations, the film won seven. For her performance, Bullock received a Golden Globe nomination for best actress and a Women's Image Network Award for Outstanding Actress. The Proposal is Fletcher's highest-grossing film as a director, and it stands as the 7th highest grossing romantic comedy of all time.

Following the success of The Proposal, Fletcher directed The Guilt Trip (2012) starring Seth Rogen and Barbra Streisand. She followed this by directing Hot Pursuit (2015) starring Reese Witherspoon and Sofía Vergara. Both of these films performed significantly worse than her previous films, with the former receiving only one Razzie Award nomination and the latter earning an 8% on Rotten Tomatoes.

In July 2014, Fletcher was announced as director for Disenchanted, the sequel to the 2007 film starring Amy Adams and Patrick Dempsey. However, in October 2016, she was replaced by her friend Adam Shankman.

In December 2018, Fletcher released Dumplin', her first film released exclusively on Netflix. The film is based on the book of the same name, and stars Jennifer Aniston as a former beauty queen. The film grapples with issues related to body positivity and mother-daughter relationships.

Fletcher directed Hocus Pocus 2, the 2022 sequel to Hocus Pocus. The film was released exclusively on Disney+ and stars Sarah Jessica Parker, Bette Midler, and Kathy Najimy as the Sanderson Sisters from the 1993 original film. The film was polarized by critics, but received two Kids' Choice Award nominations, including Favorite Movie (losing to Sonic the Hedgehog 2). She will reprise her role as director on the upcoming Hocus Pocus 3.

== Filmography ==
=== Director ===
Film

- Step Up (2006)
- 27 Dresses (2008)
- The Proposal (2009)
- The Guilt Trip (2012)
- Hot Pursuit (2015)
- Dumplin' (2018)
- Hocus Pocus 2 (2022)

Television

- Heart of Life (TV movie, 2019)
- Step Up (1 episode, 2019)
- This Is Us (4 episodes, 2020–21)
- AJ and the Queen (1 episode, 2020)
- Love, Victor (1 episode, 2020)

=== Choreographer ===
- The Flintstones (1994)
- The Mask (1994)
- Tank Girl (1995)
- Casper (1995)
- Buffy the Vampire Slayer (1997) TV series
- George of the Jungle (1997)
- Boogie Nights (1997)
- A Life Less Ordinary (1997)
- Anastasia (1997)
- Titanic (1997)
- Almost Heroes (1998)
- Blast from the Past (1999)
- She's All That (1999)
- The Out-of-Towners (1999)
- Dudley Do-Right (1999)
- Judging Amy (1999) TV series
- Bring It On (2000)
- Grosse Pointe (2000) TV series
- The Family Man (2000)
- The Wedding Planner (2001)
- Monkeybone (2001)
- The Trumpet of the Swan (2001)
- Six Feet Under (2001) TV series
- Maybe It's Me (2001) TV Series
- Not Another Teen Movie (2001)
- Orange County (2002)
- Showboy (2002)
- Like Mike (2002)
- The Master of Disguise (2002)
- Bringing Down the House (2003)
- Return to the Batcave: The Misadventures of Adam and Burt (2003) (TV)
- Down with Love (2003)
- Dickie Roberts: Former Child Star (2003)
- Along Came Polly (2004)
- Scooby-Doo 2: Monsters Unleashed (2004)
- Catwoman (2004)
- The Pacifier (2005)
- Ice Princess (2005)
- The Longest Yard (2005)
- The 40-Year-Old Virgin (2005)
- Hairspray (2007)
- Step Up 2: The Streets (2008)

== Reception ==
Critical, public, and commercial reception to films Fletcher has directed as of April 24, 2023.

Film	Rotten Tomatoes	Metacritic	CinemaScore	Budget	Box office
Step Up	21% (108 reviews)	48 (23 reviews)	A-	$12 million	$114.2 million
27 Dresses	41% (154 reviews)	47 (31 reviews)	B+	$30 million	$162.7 million
The Proposal	45% (190 reviews)	48 (30 reviews)	—N/a	$40 million	$317.4 million
The Guilt Trip	37% (128 reviews)	50 (29 reviews)	—N/a	$40 million	$41.9 million
Hot Pursuit	8% (179 reviews)	31 (36 reviews)	C+	$35 million	$51.4 million
Dumplin'	87% (69 reviews)	53 (16 reviews)	—N/a	$13 million	—N/a
Hocus Pocus 2	64% (154 reviews)	56 (32 reviews)	—N/a	$40 million	—N/a
