= List of travel books =

Travel books have been written since Classical times.

Note: Listed by year of publication of the majority of the writer's notable works.

== Ancient Near East ==
- Wenamun, Egyptian priest
  Story of Wenamun, account of his travels through the Mediterranean sea.

== Classical Antiquity ==
- Xenophon (431–355 BC)
  Anabasis - about the expedition of Cyrus the Younger, a Persian prince, against his brother, King Artaxerxes II. The book then moves on to Cyrus' Greek troops travels through Asia Minor back home to Greece.
- Lucian of Samosata (c. 125 – after c. 180)
  True History – documents a fantastic voyage that parodies many mythical travels recounted by other authors, such as Homer; considered to be among the first works of science fiction.
- Pausanias (fl. 2nd century)
  Description of Greece
- Decimus Magnus Ausonius (c. 310 – 395)
  Mosella (The Moselle, c. 370) – describes the poet's trip to the banks of the river Moselle, then in Gaul.
- Faxian (c. 337 – c. 422), Chinese traveler to India and Ceylon
  A Record of Buddhistic Kingdoms: Being an Account by the Chinese Monk Fâ-Hien of His Travels in India and Ceylon (A.D. 399-414) in Search of the Buddhist Books of Discipline
- Rutilius Claudius Namatianus (fl. 5th century)
  De reditu suo (Concerning His Return, c. 416) – the poet describes his voyage along the Mediterranean seacoast from Rome to Gaul.
- Navigatio Sancti Brendani Abbatis (c. 512-530) – describes Saint Brendan's alleged voyage to North America.
- Cosmas Indicopleustes (fl. 6th century), Byzantine traveler who made several voyages to India during the reign of emperor Justinian.
  Christian Topography (c. 550)

== Tang dynasty ==
- Xuanzang (602 – 664)
  Great Tang Records on the Western Regions (646) – narrative of the Buddhist monk's journey from China to India.
- Hyecho (704-787)
  Wang ocheonchukguk jeon (723 – 727/728), travelogue by Korean (Shila) Buddhist monk Hyecho, who pilgrimaged from Korea to India.
- Ennin (c. 793 or 794 – 864), Japanese Buddhist monk who chronicled his travels in Tang China
  The Record of a Pilgrimage to China in Search of the Law (838-847)

== 10th century ==
- Ibn Hawqal, Arab writer, geographer, and chronicler. Travelled to remote parts of the European Mediterranean, Asia and Africa. Ṣūrat al-’Arḍ (صورة الارض; "The face of the Earth").
- Ahmad ibn Fadlan, Kitab ila Mulk al-Saqaliba (A letter to the king al-Saqaliba, Ibn Fadlan's account of the caliphal embassy from Baghdad to the King of the Volga Bulghars, c. 921)

== 11th century ==
- Nasir Khusraw (1004 – 1088), Persian traveler in the Middle East
  Safarnama (c. 1046)

== 12th century ==
- Abu ad-Din al-Husayn Muhammad ibn Ahmad ibn Jubayr (1145 – 1217)
  The Travels of Ibn Jubayr (c. 1185)
- Gerald of Wales (1146 – 1223)
  Itinerarium Cambriae (Journey Through Wales, 1191)

== 13th century ==
- Yaqut al-Hamawi (1179–1229)
  Mu'jam Al-Buldan (Dictionary of Countries)
- The Vinland Sagas (early 13th century)
- Giovanni da Pian del Carpine (1182 – 1252), franciscan missionary and archbishop of Antivari
  Ystoria Mongalorum (c. 1240), the report of his embassy to the Great Khan on behalf of the Papacy. It is the oldest European account of the Mongols.
- William of Rubruck (c. 1220 – c. 1293)
  Itinerarium fratris Willielmi de Rubruquis de ordine fratrum Minorum, Galli, Anno gratia 1253 ad partes Orientales
- Marco Polo (1254 – 1324 or 1325), Venetian traveller to China and the Mongol Empire, and Rustichello da Pisa(fl. late 13th century), writer.
  Il Milione (1298)

== 14th century ==
- John of Montecorvino (1247–1328), Italian Franciscan missionary, founder of the earliest Roman Catholic missions in India and China. Archbishop of Cambalec.
  Letters (1305-1306)
- Odoric of Pordenone (1286–1331), Franciscan missionary who visited China
  Viaggio del beato frate odorico di porto maggiore del friuli...
- Ibn Battuta (1304 – 1368 or 1369), Moroccan world traveler
  The Rihla (1355) – literally entitled: "A Gift to Those Who Contemplate the Wonders of Cities and the Marvels of Traveling".
- Giovanni de' Marignolli
  Cronica Boemorum
- John Mandeville, Pseudonym
  The Travels of Sir John Mandeville (c. 1356), an imaginary account of his travels in Asia based on a variety of true sources about the eastern countries, such as Pordenone's.
- Niccolò de' Conti (c. 1395 – 1469), Venetian merchant and explorer who traveled extensively through the Middle East, India, and Southeast Asia.
  Account of Niccolò de' Conti* (translated into Latin by Poggio Bracciolini, c. 1444)

== 15th century ==
- Johannes Witte de Hese (c. 1400)
  Itinerarius, a fictional account with fantastic elements and impossible geography
- Ruy Gonzáles de Clavijo (died in 1412), Spanish ambassador of Henry III of Castile to the court of Timur.
  Narrative of the Embassy of Ruy Gonzalez de Clavijo to the Court of Timour at Samarcand AD 1403-6.
- Ghiyath al-din Naqqash who wrote, in Persian, a detailed account of his travel from Herat to Beijing on a diplomatic mission in 1420-1422. It became one of the most detailed accounts of China in the Persian and Turkish literature for the next century or two.
- Ma Huan (ca. 1380 - 1460) and Fei Xin (ca. 1385 - after 1436), each of whom wrote a book about the lands visited with Zheng He's fleet.
- Niccolò de' Conti (1395–1469), an Italian merchant who explored India, China and Indonesia from 1419 to 1444.
  His travel account was written by request of Pope Eugene IV and is included in Book IV of "De varietate fortunae" by Poggio Bracciolini.
- Pedro Tafur (c. 1410 – c. 1484) Spanish diplomat of king Juan II of Castile. He travelled across Europe, Morocco and the Near East.
  Andanças e viajes de Pero Tafur por diversas partes del mundo avidos.
- Afanasy Nikitin (? – 1474), Russian merchant, traveler and writer
  A Journey Beyond the Three Seas, travel notes during his journey to India in 1466–1472.
- Conrad Grünenberg, Pilgrimage to the Holy Land (1486)
- Bernard von Breydenbach (ca. 1440-1497) a deacon of Mainz Cathedral, Germany.
  Peregrinatio in terram sanctam (1486) an account of his travels to the Holy Land alongside Erhard Reuwich, an artist hired specifically to make the woodblock prints for the Peregrinatio. This book is one of the first fully illustrated pilgrims' guides in history.
- Christopher Columbus (c. 1450 – 1506), Journal of the first voyage

== 16th century ==
- Ludovico di Varthema (1470 – 1517), Italian traveler, first non-Muslim European to enter Mecca as a pilgrim.
  The Itinerary of Ludovico Di Varthema of Bologna from 1502 to 1508
- Zahir-ud-din Muhammad Babur (1483-1531), founder of the Mughal Empire
  Baburnama, memoirs, including his descriptions of the places he lived and/or conquered.
- Duarte Barbosa (?–1521), Portuguese writer and explorer who died in Magellan's circumnavigation
  The book of Duarte Barbosa: an account of the countries bordering the Indian Ocean and their inhabitants (1516, originally known through the testimony of Italian Giovanni Battista Ramusio)
- Antonio Pigafetta (c. 1491 – c. 1531), Venetian explorer.
  Relazione del primo viaggio intorno al mondo (1524). An account of the first circumnavigation of the globe.
- Gaspar da Cruz (ca. 1520–1570)
  Tratado das cousas da China became the first book-length work on China in Europe; it also told about the author's experiences in Cambodia and Hormuz
- Piri Reis (died in 1553) Turkish geographer known for his World Map.
  Kitab-ı Bahriye(Book of Navigation), a detailed book about the Mediterranean Sea.
- Álvar Núñez Cabeza de Vaca (c. 1488/1490 – 1557/1558), Spanish conqueror and explorer
  La Relación (1542). An account of his eight year's captivity and exploration in North America.
- Fernão Mendes Pinto (1509–1583), Portuguese explorer and writer
  Peregrinação (meaning "Pilgrimage", published posthumously in 1614) – memoir of his travels in the Middle and Far East, Ethiopia, Arabian Sea, India and Japan, as one of the first Europeans to reach it in 1542.
- Giovanni Battista Ramusio (1485–1557), Venetian geographer and compiler
  Navigationi et Viaggi ("Navigations and Travels") (1555-1559); a large collection of explorers' first-hand accounts of their travels around the world, the first one of its kind.
- Luís de Camões (~1525-1580)
  Os Lusíadas (1572)
- Richard Hakluyt (c. 1552–1616), English priest and travel writings compiler
  The Principall Navigations, Voiages and Discoveries of the English Nation (1589) – a foundational text of the travel literature genre.
- Seydi Ali Reis (1498–1563), Turkish sailor.
  Mirat ul Memalik (The Mirror of Countries) about his voyage to India
- Anthony Knivet (fl. 1591–1649), British sailor and privateer, who was held captive in Brazil by the Portuguese and then by the indigenous Tupí.
  The Admirable Adventures and Strange Fortunes of Master Antonie Knivet, which went with Master Thomas Candish in his Second Voyage to the South Sea (1591)
- Jan Huyghen van Linschoten (1563 - 1611), Dutch merchant, trader, and historian who traveled throughout India and Southeast Asia as a secretary to the Portuguese Viceroy.
  Itinerario (1596), published in English as Discours of Voyages into Y East & West Indies (1598)

== 17th century ==
- Samuel de Champlain, (1567-1635), French explorer, founder of New France & Quebec City.
  Des Sauvages: ou voyage de Samuel Champlain, de Brouages, faite en la France nouvelle l'an 1603 (1604)
  Brief Discours des Choses plus remarquables que Sammuel Champlain de Brouage a reconneues aux Indes Occidentalles au voiage qu'il en a faict en icettes en l'année 1599 et en l'année 1601, comme ensuite
  Voyages de la Nouvelle France (1632
  Traitté de la marine et du devoir d'un bon marinier (1632)
- Samuel Purchas, (c. 1577–1626), English cleric and travel writings compiler.
  Purchas, his Pilgrimage; or, Relations of the World and the Religions observed in all Ages, (1613)
  Purchas, his Pilgrim. Microcosmus, or the historie of Man. Relating the wonders of his Generation, vanities in his Degeneration, Necessity of his Regeneration, (1619)
  Hakluytus Posthumus or Purchas his Pilgrimes, contayning a History of the World in Sea Voyages and Lande Travells, by Englishmen and others (4 vols.), (1625).
- Thomas Coryat, (c. 1577–1617), English traveller
  Coryat's Crudities hastily gobbled up in Five Months Travels (1611)
- Pedro Páez, (1564–1622), Spanish jesuit missionary in Ethiopia
  History of Ethiopia (1620), includes the first account of one of the sources of the Nile River ever written by a European.
- Evliya Çelebi, (1610–1683), Turkish traveller
  Seyahatname
- Johann Sigmund Wurffbain (1613–1661)
  Reise Nach Den Molukken Und Vorder-Indien, 1632–1646 (Travel to the Moluccas and the Middle East Indies, 1632–1646) (1646)
- François de La Boullaye-Le Gouz (1623–1668)
  Les voyages et observations du sieur de La Boullaye Le gouz (1653 & 1657) – one of the first true travel books.
- Edward Terry (1590–1660)
  A Voyage to East-India (1655)
- Pietro Della Valle, (1586–1652), Italian who traveled throughout Asia during the Renaissance period
  The travels of Signor Pietro Della Valle, a Noble Roman, into East India and Arabia deserts...
- Jerónimo Lobo (1595–1678), a Portuguese Jesuit missionary in Ethiopia.
  Itinerário. This book was translated by Samuel Johnson in 1723 and inspired his own work The History of Rasselas, Prince of Abissinia.
- François Bernier (1625–1688), personal physician of the Mughal emperor Aurangzeb during his long stay in India.
  Travels in the Mogul Empire (1671)
- Jean-Baptiste Tavernier (1605–1689), gem merchant who made several trips to Persia and India between the years 1630 and 1668
  Les Six Voyages de Jean-Baptiste Tavernier (1675)
- Jean Chardin (1643–1713), jewellery trader who travelled to Persia and India
  The Travels of Sir John Chardin in Persia and the Orient (edited bit by bit between 1686 and 1711).
- Matsuo Bashō (1644–1694)
  Nozarashi Kikō (Records of a Weather-Exposed Skeleton) (1684)
  Kashima Kiko (A Visit to Kashima Shrine) (1687)
  Oi no Kobumi, or Utatsu Kiko (Record of a Travel-Worn Satchel) (1688)
  Sarashina Kiko (A Visit to Sarashina Village) (1688)
  The Narrow Road to the Deep North and Other Travel Sketches (trans. 1967)
- Adam Olearius (1599–1671), German scholar, mathematician, geographer and librarian
  Beschreibung der muscowitischen und persischen Reise (1647)

== 18th century ==
- George Shelvocke (c. 1675 – 1742) English privateer who carried out a Circumnavigation of the world.
  A Voyage Round the World by Way of the Great South Sea (1723), a book that inspired The Rime of the Ancient Mariner by Samuel Coleridge.
- Richard Pococke English bishop in Ireland, the traveller in Europe and the Middle East
  A Description of the East and Some other Countries
- Daniel Defoe (c. 1660–1731) English trader, writer, journalist, pamphleteer, and spy.
  "A tour thro' the whole island of Great Britain, first published in three volumes between 1724 and 1727, an account of Defoe's tours, or circuits, throughout England, Wales, and Scotland, with a focus on the social and cultural landscape as well as the geographic.
- Jonathan Swift (1667–1745)
  Gulliver's Travels (1726, amended 1735, a satiric parody of the genre)
- Osman Aga of Temesvar (1670–1725) Turkish soldier who wrote Gavurların Esiri ("Prisoner of Infidels") in 1724 about his POW days in Austria
- Charles Marie de La Condamine (1701–1774), French geographer and mathematician who took part in the Geodesic Mission to Peru of 1735–1739, the first international scientific expedition.
  Journal du voyage fait à l'Equateur servant d'introduction historique à la Mesure des trois premiers degrés du Méridien (1751)
- Jorge Juan y Santacilia and Antonio de Ulloa, two Spanish mathematicians who also participated in the aforementioned scientific expedition
  Relación histórica del viage a la América Meridional (1748)
- Lady Mary Wortley Montagu (1689–1762) – known for the letters she wrote during several trips abroad, which were important for later female travel writers. These letters include:
  Turkish Embassy Letters – letters describing her life as an ambassador's wife in Turkey, important as one of the earliest discussions of the Muslim world by a woman
- Frederic Louis Norden, Danish naval captain
  Voyage d'Egypte et de Nubie (1755), contains the first drawings of ancient Egyptian monuments.
- Henry Fielding (1707–1754)
  "Journal of a Voyage to Lisbon" (1755)
- Ilarione da Bergamo Daily Life in Colonial Mexico: The Journey of Friar Ilarione da Bergamo, 1761-1768.
- Tobias Smollett (1721–1771)
  Travels through France and Italy (1766)
- Laurence Sterne (1713–1768)
  A Sentimental Journey Through France and Italy (1768)
- Louis Antoine de Bougainville (1729–1811), French navigator, explorer and military commander.
  Le voyage autour du monde, par la frégate La Boudeuse, et la flûte L'Étoile (1772), a book about his circumnavigation, famous at its time for his description of Tahiti as an paradisiac utopia. It also inspired Diderot's Supplément au voyage de Bougainville.
- Samuel Johnson (1709–1784)
  A Journey to the Western Islands of Scotland (1775) – the lexicographer and his friend James Boswell (1740–1795) visit Scotland in 1773.
- James Boswell (1740–1795)
  "An Account of Corsica, The Journal of a Tour to That Island, and Memoirs of Pascal Paoli" (1768) – the earliest piece of literature about the Grand Tour.
  "The Journal of a Tour to the Hebrides with Samuel Johnson, LL.D" (1785) – a travel journal by Boswell about his trip with Samuel Johnson (1709–1784) to Scotland in 1773.
- James Bruce (1730–1794), a Scottish traveller in North Africa and Ethiopia.
  Travels to Discover the Source of the Nile (1790) where he claims to have been the first European to discover the source of the Blue Nile, despite previous accounts by Paez and Lobo mentioned above.
- Paremmakkal Thoma Kathanar (1736–1799), Indian Catholic priest
  Varthamanappusthakam (1790) – one of the earliest travelogues in an Indian language
- Thomas Jefferson (1743–1826)
  Thomas Jefferson Travels: Selected Writings, 1784-1789 – record of Jefferson's travels in France, Holland, Germany and Italy, included in his Complete Works with selected portions in various collections of his writings.
- Ann Radcliffe (1764–1823)
  A Journey Made in the Summer of 1794 (1795)
- Mary Wollstonecraft (1759–1797)
  A Short Residence in Sweden (1796)
  Letters Written in Sweden, Norway, and Denmark (1796)
- Jippensha Ikku (1765–1831)
  Tokaidochu Hizakurige (The Shank's Mare) – one of the most famous of the Edo period michiyuki (journey) novels.
- Sir Alexander MacKenzie (1764-1820)
  Voyages from Montreal Through the Continent of North America to the Frozen and Pacific Oceans in 1789 and 1793 (1801)

== 19th century ==
- Johann Gottfried Seume (1763–1810)
  Spaziergang nach Syrakus (1803)
- Dorothy Wordsworth (1771–1855)
  Recollections of a Tour Made in Scotland, A. D. 1803 (finished and first circulated in 1803; first published in 1874)
- John Quincy Adams (1767–1848)
  Letters on Silesia: Written During a Tour Through That Country in the Years 1800, 1801 (1804)
- John Pinkerton (1758–1826) (editor)
  A General Collection of the Best and Most Interesting Voyages and Travels in All Parts of the World; many of which are now first translated into English. (1808-1814, in 17 volumes)
- Johann Wolfgang von Goethe (1743 – 1832)
  Italienische Reise (1816–1817)
- Domingo Francisco Jorge Badía y Leblich, better known by his pseudonym Ali Bey el Abbassi (1767–1818), Spanish traveler and spy in the Middle East
  Viajes de Ali Bey
- Sir Henry Holland, 1st Baronet (1788–1873)
  Travels in the Ionian Isles, Albania, Thessaly, Macedonia, &c., during the years 1812 and 1813 (1815)
- Marie-Henri Beyle, better known as Stendhal (1783–1842), French novelist
  Rome, Naples et Florence (1817)
- Mary Shelley (1797 – 1851), English writer, author of Frankenstein
  History of a Six Weeks' Tour (1817)
  Rambles in Germany and Italy, in 1840, 1842, and 1843 (1844)
- James Fenimore Cooper (1789–1851)
  Gleanings in Europe: Switzerland (1836)
  Gleanings in Europe: The Rhine (1836)
  Gleanings in Europe: England (1837)
- Marquis de Custine (1790–1857)
  Empire of the Czar: A Journey Through Eternal Russia (1838)
- Heinrich Heine (1797–1856)
  Reisebilder (1826–33)
  Harzreise (1853)
- Frances Trollope (1779–1863)
  Domestic Manners of the Americans (1832)
- Washington Irving (1783-1859)
  The Alhambra : a series of tales and sketches of the Moors and Spaniards (1832)
- Fanny Parkes (1794-1875)
  Wanderings of a pilgrim in search of the picturesque, during four-and-twenty years in the East with revelations of life in the zenana, 2 vols (1850)
  Begums, Thugs & Englishmen, the journals of Fanny Parkes (2002)
- Isabella Frances Romer (1798–1852)
  A Pilgrimage to the Temples and Tombs of Egypt, Nubia and Palestine in 1845–6 (1846)
- Flora Tristan (1803–1844)
  Peregrinations of a Pariah (1838)
  Promenades in London (1840)
- Karl Baedeker (1801–1859), German publisher whose company set the standard for authoritative guidebooks for tourists
- Rifa'a el-Tahtawi (1801–1873), Egyptian traveler to France
  Takhlis al-Ibriz fi Talkhis Bariz ("An Imam in Paris: Account of a Stay in France by an Egyptian Cleric (1826-1831)", 1834)
- Theodor Fontane (1819–1898), German novelist and poet
  Wanderungen durch die Mark Brandenburg (1862–1889)
- Lady Hester Stanhope (1776–1839) – the first modern "Holy Land" archaeologist, also a memoirist:
  Memoirs of the Lady Hester Stanhope as related by herself in Conversations with her Physician (1846)
  Travels of Lady Hester Stanhope, forming the Completion of her Memoirs narrated by her Physician (1847)
- George Borrow (1803–1881)
  The Bible in Spain (1843)
  Wild Wales (1862)
- Susanna Moodie (1803–1885)
  Roughing it in the Bush (1852)
- John Lloyd Stephens (1805–1852)
  Incidents of Travel in Egypt, Arabia Petræa and the Holy Land (1837)
  Incidents of Travel in Greece, Turkey, Russia and Poland (1838)
  Incidents of Travel in Central American, Chiapas and Yucatán (1841)
  Incidents of Travel in Yucatán (1843)
- Alexis de Tocqueville (1805–1859)
  Journey to America (1831–1832)
- Nehemiah Adams (1806-1878)
  A South-Side View of Slavery (1854)
- Hans Christian Andersen (1805–1875)
  The Improvisatore (1835)
- Charles Darwin (1809–1882)
  The Voyage of the Beagle (1839)
- Fanny Calderón de la Barca (1804-1881)
  Life in Mexico (1843)
  The Attache in Madrid (1856)
- Alexander Kinglake (1809–1891)
  Eothen (1844)
- Charles Dickens (1812–1870)
  American Notes (1842)
  Pictures from Italy (1844–1845)
- Herman Melville (1819–1891)
  Typee: A Peep at Polynesian Life (1846)
  Omoo: A Narrative of Adventures in the South Seas (1847) chronicles of Melville's experiences as a sailor in Polynesia.
- Gustave Flaubert (1821–1880) left travel notes and letters, including:
  Flaubert in Egypt: A Sensibility on Tour (publ.1972) letters
- Alfred Russel Wallace (1823–1913)
  The Malay Archipelago describes eight years exploring Indonesia and other islands
- Lord Dufferin (1826–1902)
  Letters from High Latitudes (1857)
- Henry Walter Bates (1825–1892)
  The Naturalist on the River Amazons (1863) describes 11 years in the Amazon rainforest
- Vishnubhat Godse (1827–1904), Indian traveller and writer
  Maza Pravas: 1857 cya Bandaci Hakikat ("My Travels: The Story of The 1857 Mutiny", 1907), description of his experiences of the Indian Rebellion of 1857 during his travels in North India
- Mary Anne Barker (1831–1911)
  Station Life in New Zealand (1870)
  A Year's Housekeeping in South Africa (1880)
- Isabella Bird (1831–1904) published more than a dozen books on her global travels, including:
  The Englishwoman in America (1856)
  The Hawaiian Archipelago (1875)
  The Golden Chersonese and the Way Thither (1883)
  Korea and her Neighbours (1898)
  The Yangtze Valley and Beyond (1899)
- Fran Levstik (1831–1887)
  Popotovanje od Litije do Cateža (1858) a journey from Litija to Catež that includes a very influential Slovenian literary programme.
- Ármin Vámbéry (1832-1913)
  His Life and Adventrures (1889)
- Jerome K. Jerome (1859–1927)
  Three Men in a Boat (1889)
  Three Men on the Bummel (1900)
- William Morris (1834–1896)
  Icelandic Journals (1911)
- Mark Twain (1835–1910)
  The Innocents Abroad (1869)
  Roughing It (1872)
  A Tramp Abroad (1880)
  Following the Equator (1897)
- Harriet Beecher Stowe (1811–1896)
  Palmetto Leaves (1873)
- John Burroughs (1837–1921)
  Fresh Fields (1884)
- William Dean Howells (1837–1920)
  Certain Delightful English Towns (1906)
- Henry James (1843–1916)
  A Little Tour in France (1884)
  English Hours (1905)
  The American Scene (1907)
  Italian Hours (1909)
- Joshua Slocum (1844–1909)
  Sailing Alone Around the World (1899)
- Robert Louis Stevenson (1850–1894)
  An Inland Voyage (1878)
  Travels with a Donkey in the Cévennes (1879)
  The Silverado Squatters (1883)
- William Eleroy Curtis (1850-1911)
  The Capitals of Spanish America (1888)
  The Land of the Nihilist: Russia: Its People, Its Palaces, Its Politics. A Narrative of Travel, in the Czar's Dominions (1888)
  Guatemala (1891)
  Costa Rica (1891)
  Ecuador (1891)
  Venezuela: A Land Where It's Always Summer (1896)
  Today in France and Germany (1897)
  Between the Andes and the Ocean (1900)
  The Turk and His Lost Provinces: Greece, Bulgaria, Servia, Bosnia (1903)
  Denmark, Norway, and Sweden (1903)
  Today in Syria and Palestine (1903)
  Modern India (1905)
  Egypt, Burma, and British Malaysia (1905)
  One Irish Summer (1909)
  Around the Black Sea (1911)
  Letters on Canada (1911)
  Turkestan: The Heart of Asia (1911)
- Sir Martin Conway (1856–1937)
  Climbing and Exploration in the Karakoram Himalayas (1894)
  Aconcagua and Tierra Del Fuego: A Book of Climbing, Travel and Exploration (1902)
- Shibli Nomani (1857–1914), Indian Islamic scholar
  Safarnama e Rome-o-Misr-o-Sham ("Travelogue of Rome and Egypt and Syria", 1892), a travelogue of Rome, Egypt, Syria and Turkey along with his scholar companion Thomas Walker Arnold
- Walter Roper Lawrence (1857–1940), English writer who served in the Indian Civil Service
  The Valley of Kashmir (1895)
  The India we Served (1929)
- Theodore Roosevelt (1858–1919)
  Ranch Life and the Hunting Trail (1888)
  Through the Brazilian Wilderness (1914)
- Pandita Ramabai (1858–1922), Indian feminist and women's rights activist
  Pandita Ramabai's American Encounter: The Peoples of the United States (1889)
- Rabindranath Tagore (1861–1941)
  Europe Jatrir Diary (Part I)(1891)
  Japan Jatri (1919)
  Russiar Chithi or Rashiar Chithi (1931)
  Parashya Jatri (1932)
- Prince Bojidar Karageorgevitch (1862–1908)
  Enchanted India (1898)
- Mary Kingsley (1862–1900)
  Travels in West Africa (1897)
- J. Smeaton Chase (1864–1923)
  Yosemite Trails (1911)
  California Coast Trails (1913)
  California Desert Trails (1919)
- Nellie Bly (1864–1922)
  Around the World in Seventy-Two Days (1890)
- Georges Clemenceau (1841-1929), French Prime Minister and WWI leader
  Au Pied du Sinaï (1898; new ed. 2000). Travels in Jewish Europe down to Palestine
- Edward Ermatinger (1797-1876)
  Edward Ermatinger's York Factory Express Journal: being a record of journeys made between Fort Vancouver and Hudson Bay in the years 1827-1828 (published 1912)
- James Theodore Bent (1852-1897), British explorer and archaeologist
  The Cyclades, or, Life among the insular Greeks (London, 1885)
  The ruined cities of Mashonaland, being a record of excavation and exploration in 1891 (London, 1891)
  The Sacred City of the Ethiopians. Being a record of travel and research in Abyssinia in 1893 (London, 1893)
  Southern Arabia (London, 1900 – completed posthumously by Mabel Bent)

== 20th century ==
- Nagai Kafu American Stories (being diaries of his travels through America, first published in Japanese as Amerika monogatari, 1908), modern ed., Columbia University Press, 2000.
- Octave Mirbeau (1848–1917)
  La 628-E8 (1908)
- Jelena Dimitrijević (1862–1945)
  Letters from Niš Regarding Harems (1897)
  Letters from Salonica on the Young Turk Revolution (1918)
  Letters from India (1928)
  Letters from Egypt (1929)
  The New World, alias: In America for a Year (1934)
- Ernest Shackleton
  South (1919)
- Edith Wharton (1862–1937)
  In Morocco (1920)
- Daisy Bates (1859-1951)
  The Passing of the Aborigines (1938)
- Ekai Kawaguchi (1866 - 1945) Three Years in Tibet (1909)
- Carl Gustaf Emil Mannerheim (1867–1951)
  Across Asia from West to East in 1906-1908 (English trans. 1940) – explorations by Czarist spy who would later become President of Finland.
- Norman Douglas (1868–1962)
  Old Calabria (1915)
- Laura Ingalls Wilder (1867-1957)
  On the Way Home (1962)
  West from Home (1974)
  A Little House Traveler (2006)
- Gertrude Bell (1868-1926)
  Persian Pictures (1894)
  Syria: The Desert and the Sown (1907)
- Felix Salten (1869–1945)
  Neue Menschen auf alter Erde: Eine Palästinafahrt (1925)
  Fünf Minuten Amerika (1931)
- André Gide (1869–1951)
  Amyntas (1906)
  Voyage au Congo (1927) – (Travels in the Congo)
  Le retour de Tchad (1928)
  Retour de l'U. R. S. S. (1936)
  Retouches â mon retour de l'U. R. S. S (1937)
- Ernest Peixotto (1869–1940)
  Our Hispanic Southwest (1916) – contains the first usage of the ethnic slur "spic"
- Hilaire Belloc (1870–1953)
  The Path to Rome (1902) – a ramble by foot from central France to Rome in 1901
- W. Somerset Maugham (1874–1965)
  On a Chinese Screen (1922) – vignettes of China from the master of the short story.
- Yone Noguchi (1875–1947)
  The American Diary of a Japanese Girl (1903)
- Jack London (1876-1916)
  The Cruise of the Snark (1911)
- Isidora Sekulic (1877–1958)
  Pisma iz Norveške / Letters from Norway (1914)
- Hermann von Keyserling (1880–1946)
  The Travel Diary of a Philosopher (1925)
- D. H. Lawrence (1885–1930)
  Sea and Sardinia (1921)
- Isak Dinesen (Karen Blixen) (1885-1962)
  Out of Africa (1938)
- Alma Karlin (1889-1950)
  Moj mali Kitajec: roman iz Kitajske / My little Chinese: a novel from China (1921)
  Urok Južnega morja / Im Banne der Sudsee (1930)
  Mistika Južnega morja, I. del Polinezija, II. del Melanezija-Mikronezija / Mistic of the South Sea; Polynesia, Melanesia- Micronesia (1931)
  Malik (1932)
  Mesečeve solze: zgodba iz Peruja / The tears of the moon: a story from Peru (1935)
  Štiri dekleta v vetru usode: Zgodba z Južnega morja / Four girls in the wind of destiny: A story from South Sea (1936,1939,1943)
  Nabobova stranska žena / Nabob's side wife (1937)
  Mala Siamka / Little Siamese (1937)
  Najmlajši vnuk častitljivega I Čaa: novela iz Kitajske / The youngest grandson of the honorable I Čaa: a novel from China (1948)
  O Joni San: Japonske novele / O Joni San: Japanese novels (2006)
  Kot ujetnica pri lovcih na glavo na Novi Gvineji / As a prisoner among the head hunters in New Guinea (1960)
  Samotno potovanje / Einsame Weltreise (1969)
  a Slovene anthropologist who spoke 12 world languages published 24 books and over 40 literary works between 1921 and 1937 from her travels in China, Japan, Papua New Guinea, India, Polynesia, Micronesia, Australia, Peru.
- Arnold J. Toynbee (1889-1975)
  Between Oxus and Jumna (1961)
  Between Niger and Nile (1965)
  Between Maule and Amazon (1967)
- Henry Vollam Morton (1892–1979)
  The Heart of London (1925)
  In Search of England (1927)
- Frederick O'Brien (1869-1932)
  White Shadows in the South Seas (1919)
  Mystic Isles of the South Seas (1921)
  Atolls of the Sun (1922
- Betty and Nancy Debenham
  Motor-Cycling for Women (1928)
- Rebecca West (1892–1983)
  Black Lamb and Grey Falcon (1941) – an 1,181-page look at Yugoslavia before World War II.
- Freya Stark (1893-1993)
  The Valleys of the Assassins (1934)
  The Southern Gates of Arabia: A Journey in the Hadhramaut (1936)
  Seen In The Hadhramaut (1938)
  A Winter in Arabia (1940)
  Ionia a Quest (1954)
  The Lycian Shore (1956)
  Alexander's Path (1958)
  Riding to the Tigris (1959).
- Rahul Sankrityayan (1893–1963), Indian writer, referred to as the "Father of Indian Travelogue"
  Volga Se Ganga ("A Journey From Volga to Ganges", 1944)
- Thomas Raucat (1894–1976)
  L'honorable partie de campagne ("The honorable picnic", 1924)
  De Shang-Haï à Canton ("From Shanghai to Canton", 1927)
- Haruko Ichikawa (1896–1943). The principal English translations of her books are:
  Japanese Lady in Europe (1937)
  Japanese Lady in America (1938)
- Amelia Earhart (1897-1937)
  20 Hrs. 40 Min. (1928)
  Last Flight (1937)
- J. Slauerhoff (1898–1936)
  Alleen de havens zijn ons trouw ("Only the Ports Are Loyal to Us", 1992 [1927–1932])
- Peter Aufschnaiter (1899–1973)
  Eight Years in Tibet (1983)
- Ernest Hemingway (1899-1961)
  A Moveable Feast (1964; published posthumously)
- Emily Kimbrough (1899–1989) – writer of travel humor
  And a Right Good Crew (1958)
- Gordon Sinclair (1900–1984)
  Khyber Caravan: Through Kashmir, Waziristan, Afghanistan, Baluchistan and Northern India (1936) – a somewhat curmudgeonly account of 1934 travels in British India by a later famous Canadian journalist and television personality.
- Richard Halliburton (1900–1939), one of the most famous explorers and adventure writers of his generation
  The Royal Road to Romance (1925)
  The Glorious Adventure (1927)
  New Worlds to Conquer (1929)
  The Flying Carpet (1932)
  Seven League Boots (1935)
- Pearl S. Buck (1892-1973) awarded the Nobel Prize in Literature, 1938.
  My Several Worlds (1954)
  A Bridge For Passing (1962)
  The People of Japan (1966)
  China as I See It (1970)
- Vivienne de Watteville (1900–1957)
  Out in the Blue (1927)
  Speak to the Earth: Wanderings and Reflections among Elephants and Mountains (1937).
- John Steinbeck (1902–1968)
  A Russian Journal (1948) – A trip through Russia, Ukraine and Georgia in the Soviet Union shortly after World War II with the friend and renowned war photographer Robert Capa.
  Travels with Charley: In Search of America (1962) – an American road book describing Steinbeck's journeys with his poodle, Charley.
- Charles Lindbergh (1902-1974)
  "WE" (1927)
  The Spirit of St. Louis (1953)
- Bimal Mukherjee (1903–1987), Indian globe trotter
  Du Chakay Duniya ("The World on Two Wheels", 1986), about his experiences of traveling through the world on a bicycle
- Chiang Yee (1903–1977)
  The Silent Traveller series – 11 books about his travels in Britain, the US and Japan
- Ella Maillart (1903 – 1997) – Swiss travel writer.
  Turkestan Solo - One Woman's Expedition from the Tien Shan to the Kizil Kum (her journey from Moscow to Kirghizstan and Uzbekistan in 1932)
  The Cruel Way (from Geneva to Kabul)
  The Land of the Sherpas (photographs and texts on her first encounter with Nepal in 1951)
- Evelyn Waugh (1903–1966)
  Labels: A Mediterranean Journal (1930)
  Remote People (1931)
  Ninety-Two Days: Travels in Guiana and Brazil (1934)
  Waugh in Abyssinia (1936)
  Robbery Under Law (1939)
  When the Going Was Good (1946)
  A Tourist in Africa (1960)
  Waugh Abroad: Collected Travel Writing (2003) – an account of the English novelist's restless wanderings around the world in the 1930s and later.
- Ferdinand Czernin von und zu Chudenitz
  This Salzburg! (1937)
- J.M. Synge (1871–1909)
  The Aran Islands, with illustrations by Jack B. Yeats. (1907)
  Travels in Wicklow, West Kerry and Connemara, with illustrations by Jack B. Yeats. (1911)
- Graham Greene (1904–1991)
  Journey Without Maps (1936)
- Gerald Brenan (1894–1987)
  The Spanish Labyrinth (1943)
  The Face of Spain (1950)
- Robert Byron (1905–1941)
  The Road to Oxiana (1937) – travels in Persia and Afghanistan
- Laurens van der Post (1906–1996)
  The Lost World of the Kalahari (1958) – Auberon Waugh (1939–2001) described van der Post as the person in whose company he'd most like to spend an evening. This book by the South African soldier/explorer/writer suggests why.
- James Michener (1907-1997)
  Iberia: Spanish Travels and Reflections (1968)
- Robert A. Heinlein (1907–1988)
  Tramp Royale (1992)
- Peter Fleming (1907–1971) – British adventurer and travel writer
  One's Company: A Journey to China in 1933 — Travels through the USSR, Manchuria and China.
  News from Tartary: A Journey from Peking to Kashmir — Journey from Peking to Srinagar via Sinkiang. He was accompanied on this journey by Ella Maillart (Kini). Later reissued as half of Travels in Tartary.
- Ian Fleming (1908–1964) – British writer and spy. Brother of Peter Fleming.
  Thrilling Cities (1963)
- M. F. K. Fisher (1908 – 1992)
  How to Cook a Wolf (1942)
  Map of Another Town: A Memoir of Provence (1964)
  Dubious Honors (1988)
  Long Ago in France: The Years in Dijon (1991)
- Claude Lévi-Strauss (1908-2009)
  Tristes Tropiques (1955)
- Martha Gellhorn (1908-1998)
  Travels with Myself and Another: A Memoir (1978)
- Kenneth Anderson (1910 – 1974), British hunter and writer, wrote about his adventures in the jungles of South India
  Man Eaters and Jungle Killers (1959)
  Jungles Long Ago (1976)
- Paul Bowles (1910–1999)
  Yallah (1957)
  Their Heads Are Green and Their Hands Are Blue (1963)
- Wilfred Thesiger (1910–2003)
  Arabian Sands (1959)
  The Marsh Arabs (1964)
- Gavin Young (1928–2001)
  Return to the Marshes (1977)
  Iraq: Land of Two Rivers (1980)
  Slow Boats to China (1981)
  Halfway Around the World: An Improbable Journey (1983)
  Slow Boats Home (1985)
- Lawrence Durrell (1912–1990)
  Prospero's Cell: A Guide to the Landscape and Manners of the Island of Corcyra (1945) – this text describes Durrell's time in Corfu. It should be read in tandem with his brother Gerald's My Family and Other Animals.
  Reflections on a Marine Venus (1953) – experiences in Rhodes.
  Bitter Lemons (1957) – travels in Cyprus.
- Fosco Maraini (1912–2004)
  Secret Tibet (1952)
  Meeting with Japan (1960)
- Heinrich Harrer (1912–2006)
  Seven Years in Tibet (1952)
  Ladakh: Gods and Mortals Behind the Himalayas (1980)
  Return to Tibet (1985)
- George Woodcock (1912-1995)
  To the City of the Dead: An Account of Travels in Mexico (1957)
  Incas and Other Men: Travels in the Andes (1959)
  Faces of India: A Travel Narrative (1964)
  Asia, Gods and Cities: Aden to Tokyo (1966)
  Kerala: A Portrait of the Malabar Coast (1967)
  South Sea Journey (1976)
  Peoples of the Coast: The Indians of the Pacific Northwest (1977)
  Caves in the Desert: Travels in China (1988)
- Balraj Sahni (1913–1973), Indian actor and writer
  Mera Pakistani Safarnama ("My Pakistani Travelogue", 1960)
  Mera Russi Safarnama ("My Russian Travelogue"; 1969)
- Gavin Maxwell (1914–1969)
  People of the Reeds (1957)
- Patrick Leigh Fermor (1915–2011)
  Mani: Travels in the Southern Peloponnese (1953)
  Roumeli: Travels in Northern Greece (1966)
  A Time Of Gifts (1977) – Covers the first part of Fermor's journey from Rotterdam to Constantinople as a 19-year-old in 1933-34. Rewritten in old age from memory, covering the Netherlands to Hungary.
  Between the Woods and the Water (1986) – The second part of the journey begun in A Time of Gifts, covering Hungary to Romania.
  Three Letters from the Andes (1991)
  The Broken Road (2013) – The third part of the journey narrated in A Time of Gifts and Between the Woods and the Water, covering Romania to Thrace.
- Camilo José Cela (1916–2002)
  Viaje a la Alcarria (1948)
- Mary Lee Settle (1918 – 2005)
  Turkish Reflections: A Biography of Place (1991)
- Eric Newby (1919–2006), popular English travel writer
  A Short Walk in the Hindu Kush (1958)
  Slowly Down the Ganges (1966)
  On the Shores of the Mediterranean (1984)
- Lucjan Wolanowski (1920–2006)
  Post to Never-Never Land (Poland, 1968) – reports from Australia.
  Heat and fever (Poland, 1970) – reports from the work in World Health Organization Information department in Geneva, travels in New Delhi, Bangkok and Manila, 1967-1968.
- Jože Javoršek (1920-1990)
  Indija Koromandija (1962), a travelogue through India by one of the most important Slovenian essayists of the 20th century
- Zulfikar "Zuko" Džumhur (1921, Konjic, Bosnia and Herzegovina – 1989) was a Bosnian writer, painter and caricaturist. He wrote screenplays and hosted TV show Hodoljublje, a travel documentary. He successfully produced this show for over ten years for television TV Sarajevo.
  Hodoljublja (1982, "TV Sarajevo" Bosnia and Herzegovina) (Travelogue - a travel documentary with focus on culture, traditions, art and nature of Bosnia and Herzegovina, (ex) Yugoslavia and countries he sojourned, primarily Islamic and countries of Mediterranean Basin.)
  Nekrolog jednoj caršiji (1958) (Obituary of a caršija (the downtown/main street Ottoman-Turkish style bazaar)) (with an introduction by Ivo Andrić)
  Pisma iz Azije (1973) (Letters from Asia)
  Pisma iz Afrike i Evrope (Letters from Africa & Europe)
  Stogodišnje price (Centennial tales)
  Putovanje bijelom Ladom (1982) (Voyage with white "Lada" ("Lada" is a brand of Russian automobile))
  Adakale
  Zelena coja Montenegra (Green carpet of Montenegro - co-authored with Serbian novelist Momo Kapor)
- Jack Kerouac (1922-1969) - American novelist, poet of French-Canadian descent
  On the Road (1957)
- Truman Capote (1924–1984) – American writer, screenwriter and reporter
  Local Color (1950)
  The Muses Are Heard (1956)
- Gerald Durrell (1925–1995)
  My Family and Other Animals (1956) – a description of an idyllic childhood on Corfu in the 1930s by the brother of Lawrence Durrell (1912–1990). This text combines natural observations, humour, storytelling, and travel.
  Fillets of Plaice (1971)
- Jan Morris (1926-2020) – author of many works, especially about cities; prior to the 1970s, her work was published under her previous name, "James Morris."
  Coast to Coast (1956)
  Oxford (1965)
  The Matter of Wales (1984)
  The World (Travels 1950 – 2000)
  Trieste and the Meaning of Nowhere (2001)
- Peter Matthiessen (1927–2014) – American novelist, naturalist and founder of The Paris Review.
  Under the Mountain Wall: A Chronicle of Two Seasons in the Stone Age (1962)
  The Snow Leopard (1978)
  East of Lo Monthang: In the Land of Mustang (1995)
- Robin Bryans (1928-2005)
  Ulster: A Journey Through the Six Counties (1962)
- Jean Baudrillard (1929–2007)
  "America" (1986)
- Che Guevara (1928–1967)
  The Motorcycle Diaries (1952) – Traces the 8000 km trip through South America of Marxist revolutionary Ernesto 'Che' Guevara, then a 23-year-old medical student, and his friend Alberto Granado a 29-year-old biochemist (who also published his own diaries of the event in Travelling with Che Guevara).
- Primož Kozak (1929-1981)
  Peter Klepec in America (1971), a travelogue through the United States by one of the most important Slovenian essayists of the 20th century
- Juan Goytisolo (born 1931)
  Campos de Nijar (1959)
- Ted Simon (born 1931)
  Jupiter's Travels (1979)
- Dervla Murphy (1931-2022)
  Full Tilt: Ireland to India with a Bicycle (1965)
  Tibetan Foothold (1966)
  The Waiting Land: A Spell in Nepal (1967)
  In Ethiopia with a Mule (1968)
  On a Shoestring to Coorg (1976)
  Where the Indus is Young (1977)
  A Place Apart (1978)
  Wheels Within Wheels: autobiography (1979)
  Race to the Finish? the nuclear stakes (1982) and further books from all over the world, the last on Israel and Palestine in 2015)
- Ryszard Kapuscinski (1932–2007)
  Another Day of Life (1976)
  The Soccer War (1978)
  The Emperor: Downfall of an Autocrat (1978)
  Shah of Shahs (1982)
  Imperium (1993)
  The Shadow of the Sun (2001)
- Cees Nooteboom (born 1933), Dutch travel writer
  Berlijnse Notities (1990)
  Roads to Santiago (1992)
  Nootebooms Hotel (2002)
- Barbara Grizzuti Harrison (1934–2002)
  Italian Days (1989)
- David Lodge (born 1935)
  Paradise News, 1991
- Hunter S. Thompson (1937-2005)
  Fear and Loathing in Las Vegas (1971)
  The Curse of Lono (1980)
- Venedict Yerofeyev (1938–1990)
  Moskva–P?tushki (1973) – a Russian tale of alcohol, love, and a train ride; translated into English as Moscow to the End of the Line.
- William Least Heat-Moon (born 1939)
  Blue Highways: A Journey into America (1982)
- Peter Mayle (born 1939)
  A Year in Provence (1989)
- Colin Thubron (born 1939)
  Mirror to Damascus (1967)
  In Siberia (1999)
  Among the Russians (1983)
  Behind the Wall: A Journey through China (1987)
  To a Mountain in Tibet (2011)
  The Amur River: Between Russia and China (2021)
- Bruce Chatwin (1940–1989)
  In Patagonia (1977) – Travels in Patagonia in the early 1970s.
  The Songlines (1987) – Travels in the outback of Australia in the early 1980s.
  What Am I Doing Here (1988) – Collected short travelogues and articles.
- Frances Mayes (born 1940)
  Under the Tuscan Sun (1996) – a memoir of buying, renovating, and living in an abandoned villa in rural Tuscany in Italy.
- Paul Theroux (born 1941) – prolific travel writer; author of nearly two dozen books of travel writing.
  The Great Railway Bazaar (1975) – Theroux's most popular travel work.
  The Old Patagonian Express (1979)
  Travelling The World - The Illustrated Travels of Paul Theroux (1990)
  The Happy Isles of Oceania (1992)
  The Pillars of Hercules (1995)
  Fresh Air Fiend (2000)
  Dark Star Safari (2002)
  Ghost Train to the Eastern Star (2008)
  The Tao of Travel (2011)
- Werner Herzog (born 1942) – German film director Of Walking in Ice – Account of a three-week walk from Munich to Paris in the Winter of 1974
- Jonathan Raban (born 1942)
  Old Glory: An American Voyage (1981)
- Michael Crichton (1942–2008)
  Travels (1988)
- Gao Xingjian (born 1940)
  Soul Mountain (1990)
- Mary Morris (born 1947)
  Nothing to Declare: Memoirs of a Woman Traveling Alone (1987)
  Wall to Wall: from Beijing to Berlin by Rail (1991)
  Angels & Aliens: A Journey West (1999)
  The River Queen (2007)
- P.J. O'Rourke (born 1947)
  Holidays in Hell (1989)
  Driving Like Crazy (2009)
  Holidays in Heck (2011)
- Wladek Wagner (1912-1992)
  By the Sun and Stars (1986)

== 21st century ==
- Larry McMurtry (1936–2021)
  Roads: Driving America's Great Highways (2000)
  Paradise (2002)
- James M. McPherson (born 1936)
  Hallowed Ground: A Walk at Gettysburg (2003)
- Taqi Usmani (born 1943)
  Andulus Mei Chand Roz (A Few Days in Al-Andalus)
  Dunya Meray Aagay (The World Ahead of me)
  Jahaan-e-Deedah (The World Beheld)
  Safar Dar Safar (Travels)
  Uhud se Qasiyoon Tak (From Uhud to Mount Qasioun)
- Michael Palin (born 1943)
  Around the World In 80 Days (1989)
  Sahara (2002)
  Himalaya (2004)
- Tom Miller (born 1947)
  Best Travel Writing 2005, introduction, pp. xvii-xxi, (2005)
  A Sense of Place: Great Travel Writers Talk About Their Craft, Lives, and Inspiration, (2004) pp. 325–343.
  Writing on the Edge: A Borderlands Reader, (ed.) (2003)
  Travelers' Tales – Cuba, (ed.) (2001)
  Jack Ruby's Kitchen Sink: Offbeat Travels Through America's Southwest (2000)
  Trading With the Enemy: A Yankee Travels Through Castro's Cuba (1992)
  The Panama Hat Trail: A Journey From South America (1986)
  Arizona: The Land and the People, (ed.) (1986)
  On the Border: Portraits of America's Southwestern Frontier (1981)
- Mikiro Sasaki (born 1947), Japanese poet and travel essayist
  Ajia kaido kiko: umi wa toshi de aru (A Travel Journal of the Asian Seaboard, 2002)
- Lawrence Millman (born 1948)
  An Evening Among Headhunters: And Other Reports from Roads Less Taken (1999)
  Last Places: A Journey in the North (2000)
  Northern Latitudes (2000)
  Lost in the Arctic: Explorations on the Edge (2002)
- Marius Kociejowski (1949)
  The Serpent Coiled in Naples (2022)
- Nick Tosches (1949)
  The Last Opium Den (2002)
- Chris Stewart (born 1950)
  Driving Over Lemons: An Optimist in Andalucia (1999)
  A Parrot in the Pepper Tree (2002)
  The Almond Blossom Appreciation Society (2007)
- Bill Bryson (born 1951)
  The Lost Continent: Travels in Small-Town America (1989)
  Neither Here Nor There: Travels in Europe (1992)
  Notes from a Small Island (1995) – travels in the United Kingdom.
  A Walk in the Woods: Rediscovering America on the Appalachian Trail (1999)
  Down Under (2001)
  Bill Bryson's African Diary (2002)
  The Road to Little Dribbling: More Notes From a Small Island (2015)
- Douglas Adams (1952–2001)
  Last Chance to See (1990)
- Vikram Seth (born 1952)
  From Heaven Lake: Travels Through Sinkiang and Tibet (1983)
- Quim Monzó (born 1952)
  Guadalajara (1997)
  Barcelona und andere Erzählungen (2007)
- Neil Peart (1952–2020), drummer for the Canadian rock band Rush
  The Masked Rider: Cycling in West Africa (1996)
  Ghost Rider: Travels on the Healing Road (2002) – a chronicle of motorcycle trips through North and Central America
  Traveling Music: The Soundtrack of My Life and Times (2004)
- Kenn Kaufman (born 1954)
  Kingbird Highway: The Story of a Natural Obsession That Got a Little Out of Hand (1997)
- Rory MacLean (born 1954)
  Stalin's Nose (1992)
  The Oatmeal Ark (1997)
  Under the Dragon (1998)
  Next Exit Magic Kingdom (2000)
  Falling for Icarus (2004)
  Magic Bus (2006)
- Colm Tóibín (born 1955)
  Homage to Barcelona (1990)
  The Sign of the Cross: Travels in Catholic Europe (1994)
- Christopher Paul Baker (born 1955)
  Mi Moto Fidel: Motorcycling Through Castro's Cuba (2001) – winner of the Lowell Thomas Award 'Travel Book of the Year' and North American Travel Journalist Association 'Grand Prize'
- Dennison Berwick (born 1956)
  Savages, The Life and Killing of the Yanomami (1992)
  Amazon (1990)
  A Walk Along the Ganges (1986)
- Anthony Bourdain (1956-2018)
  A Cook's Tour (2001)
- Pico Iyer (born 1957)
  Video Night in Kathmandu (1988)
  Falling off the Map: Some Lonely Places of the World (1993)
  Sun after Dark: Flights into the Foreign (2004)
  The Half Known Life: In Search of Paradise (2023)
- Geoff Dyer (born 1958)
  Yoga for People Who Can't Be Bothered to Do It (2003)
  White Sands: Experiences from the Outside World (2016)
- Tony Horwitz (born 1958)
  One for the Road: An Outback Adventure (1987)
  Baghdad without a Map and Other Misadventures in Arabia (1991)
  Confederates in the Attic: Dispatches from the Unfinished Civil War (1998)
  Blue Latitudes: Boldly Going Where Captain Cook Has Gone Before (2002)
  A Voyage Long and Strange: Rediscovering the New World (2008)
- Rebecca Solnit (born 1961)
  Wanderlust: A History of Walking (2000)
  A Field Guide to Getting Lost (2005)
  Infinite City: A San Francisco Atlas (2010)
- Chuck Palahniuk (born 1962)
  Fugitives and Refugees: A Walk in Portland, Oregon (2003)
- Jeffrey Tayler (born 1962)
  Siberian Dawn: A Journey Across the New Russia (1999)
  Facing the Congo: A Modern-Day Journey into the Heart of Darkness (2000)
  Glory in a Camel's Eye: Trekking Through the Moroccan Sahara (2003)
  Angry Wind: Through Muslim Black Africa by Truck, Bus, Boat, and Camel (2005)
  River of No Reprieve: Descending Siberia's Waterway of Exile, Death, and Destiny (2006)
- Sam Miller (born 1962), British journalist and writer
  Delhi: Adventures in a Megacity (2009)
  A Strange Kind of Paradise: India Through Foreign Eyes (2014)
  India, and Fathers (2017)
- Karl Taro Greenfeld (born 1964)
  Speed Tribes: Days and Nights with Japan's Next Generation (1995)
- Tim Moore (born 1964)
  Frost on My Moustache: The Arctic Exploits of a Lord and a Loafer (1999)
  Continental Drifter: Taking the Low Road with the First Grand Tourist (2001)
  French Revolutions: Cycling the Tour de France (2001)
  Spanish Steps: One Man and His Ass on the Pilgrim Way to Santiago (2004)
  You are Awful (but I Like You): Travels in Unloved Britain (2012)
  Gironimo! Riding the Very Terrible 1914 Tour of Italy (2014)
  The Cyclist Who Went out in the Cold: Adventures Along the Iron Curtain (2016)
  Another Fine Mess: Across the USA in a Ford Model T (2018)
  Vuelta Skelter: Riding the Remarkable 1941 Tour of Spain (2021)
- William Dalrymple (born 1965)
  In Xanadu: A Quest (1989)
  From the Holy Mountain (1994)
  Nine Lives: In Search of the Sacred in Modern India (2009)
- Jay Griffiths (born 1965)
  Wild (2006)
- Tahir Shah (born 1966)
  Beyond the Devil's Teeth (1995)
  Sorcerer's Apprentice (1998)
  Trail of Feathers (2001)
  In Search of King Solomon's Mines (2002)
  House of the Tiger King (2004)
  The Caliph's House (2006)
  In Arabian Nights (2008)
  Travels With Myself: Collected Work (2011)
  Timbuctoo (2012)
- Guy Delisle (born 1966)
  Shenzhen: A Travelogue from China (2000)
  Pyongyang: A Journey in North Korea (2003)
  Burma Chronicles (2007)
  Jerusalem: Chronicles from the Holy City (2011)
- Cheryl Strayed (born 1968)
  Wild: From Lost to Found on the Pacific Crest Trail (2012)
- J. Maarten Troost (born 1969)
  The Sex Lives of Cannibals: Adrift in the Equatorial Pacific (2004)
  Getting Stoned with Savages: A Trip Through the Islands of Fiji and Vanuatu (2006)
- Elizabeth Gilbert (born 1969)
  Eat, Pray, Love: One Woman's Search for Everything, Across Italy, India and Indonesia (2006)
- Bishwanath Ghosh (born 1970), Indian writer and journalist
  Chai, Chai: Travels in Places Where You Stop But Never Get Off (2009)
- Kira Salak (born 1971)
  The Cruelest Journey: 600 Miles to Timbuktu (2004)
- Tom Bissell (born 1974)
  Chasing the Sea: Lost Among the Ghosts of Empire in Central Asia (2003)

Vyacheslav Krasko (born 1974)

The Year of Spring: The Travel What Lasts a Year (2012)

- Ludovic Hubler (born 1977)
  Le monde en stop (2009)
- Steve Davey
  Unforgettablep Places to See Before You Die (2004)
- Supriya Saxena
  Poems of Rajasthan (2022)
  A travel poetry book on Rajasthan, the largest desert state in India.
- Christopher Gordon (born 1963)
  Letters From Faraway Lands (2026)
  Correspondence from Nepal, Uganda, and Rwanda
