= Richard Fowler (naturalist) =

Richard Albin Fowler
- Born: September 17, 1947; Florida, United States
- Died: March 7, 2016 (aged 68)
- Military career
- Branch: United States Army
- Nickname: Aukcoo
- Unit: 101st Airborne Division
- Conflicts: Battle of Huế; Battle of Hamburger Hill
- Awards: 5 Bronze Star Medals
- Other work: Wilderness guide
- Website: www.iquitostimes.com/rfowler-index.htm

Richard Albin "Aukcoo" Fowler (September 17, 1947 – March 7, 2016) was an American wilderness guide, naturalist, and former U.S. Army Ranger based in Iquitos, a city in Peruvian Amazonia.

== Life and career ==
Fowler was born in the U.S. state of Florida in 1947. The Vietnam War began when Fowler was eight years old. He enlisted in the U.S. Army in September 1967, a few days before his 20th birthday. He was assigned to a long-range reconnaissance patrol in the 101st Airborne Division. He served two tours of duty, and took part in the Battle of Huế, the Battle of Hamburger Hill, and the Tet Offensive. Fowler says he enlisted in part because he was drawn to the rainforest; once there, he felt that it gave reason to the chaos of his life. He expatriated to Peru in 1994, and continued to live much of his life in the jungle. He made a living as a wilderness guide, catering to those who preferred a jungle experience based on survival skills. In his study of nature, he became a specialist in reptiles.

Fowler resided in Iquitos, a city in Peruvian Amazonia. Bill Grimes, a local business owner and fellow expatriate, was acquainted with Fowler: "Richard's niche is mostly hard core, adventurous, soldier of fortune, survivalist types. His tours are rough, with few comforts." Another commenter described Fowler as a "hero of people whose personal libraries consist of exactly: Soldier of Fortune back issues, Gary Larson cartoons, Apocalypse Now: The Picture Book, and Heart of Darkness". Indeed, Fowler sometimes advertised in Soldier of Fortune, a mercenary magazine published in the US. "He told us that his home was the jungle," wrote Lawrence Winkler, one of Fowler's clients. "Iquitos was just a refueling stop, a few days of spirits and smokes and señoritas, and story-swapping sagas, too incredible not to be true."

== In the works of travel writers ==
Fowler features in writer-filmmaker Tahir Shah's travel books Trail of Feathers (2001) and House of the Tiger King (2003). Shah writes that when he first arrived in Iquitos, he searched for a guide to take him into the Amazon rainforest for his Trail of Feathers expedition. An American expat called Max tells him, "You need a man who can trek through the rain-forest in the dead of night ... A man who can kill an anaconda with his bare hands; who can live on a diet of tree grubs washed down with his own urine; a man who's taken ayahuasca a hundred times, who'll protect you if it means sacrificing his own life ... a man who has no fear." Max then presents him with Fowler, who, according to Max, fulfills all the above requirements. Shah recounts his first impression of Fowler:

Standing in the frame was a ferocious-looking foreigner. A shade over six feet, he was as lean as a race horse, with a back so straight as to be unnatural. He was drenched with rain and dressed from top to toe in camouflage ... His unshaven face was daubed red in warpaint, its long chin etched with a diagonal scar. Around his neck were military dog tags.

— Tahir Shah, Trail of Feathers (2001)

Fowler tells him, "I promise that if you hire me, I will keep you alive." In the dedication for Trail of Feathers, Shah writes: "I am grateful to Richard Fowler, 101st Airborne Division, for keeping his promise." Shah soon returned to Peru to search for a film and book project based on the search for the legendary Inca city of Paititi. He rehired Fowler, but reluctantly. "I had vowed never to communicate with him again", Shah explains, "[but] I needed a security man. However impossible he was, Richard was a known entity." Fowler appears in the documentary film made during the expedition: House of the Tiger King (2004), directed by David Flamholc.

Another travel writer who took part in a Fowler tour was former NASA engineer Lawrence Winkler, who had read Tahir's work. He recounts his experience in his 2016 travelogue, Stout Men.
