= Devil's Tooth =

Devil's Tooth may refer to:

- Hydnellum peckii, a mushroom species
- Devils Tooth (Idaho), a mountain in Idaho
- Koko (gorilla)#Pets, a parrot Koko the gorilla was scared of
- Devils tooth, a peak in Drakenstein Mountain
- The Devil's Teeth, a non-fiction book
- Farallon Islands, an island sometimes referred to as "Devil's Teeth"
- Beyond the Devil's Teeth, a travel book
