= King Solomon's Mines (disambiguation) =

King Solomon's Mines is an 1885 adventure novel by H. Rider Haggard.

King Solomon's Mines may also refer to:

- King Solomon's Mines (1937 film), a British film adaptation
- King Solomon's Mines (1950 film), an American film adaptation
- King Solomon's Mines (1985 film), an American film adaptation
- King Solomon's Mines, a 1986 Australian animated film produced by Burbank Films Australia
- King Solomon's Mines (2004 film), an American television miniseries adaptation
- Timna Valley, a valley in Israel that has been speculated to contain King Solomon's mines

== See also ==
- The Search for King Solomon's Mines, a 2002 documentary commissioned by National Geographic Television and UK's Channel 4
- The Librarian: Return to King Solomon's Mines, a 2006 American television film
