= King Solomon's Mines =

1885 novel by H. Rider Haggard

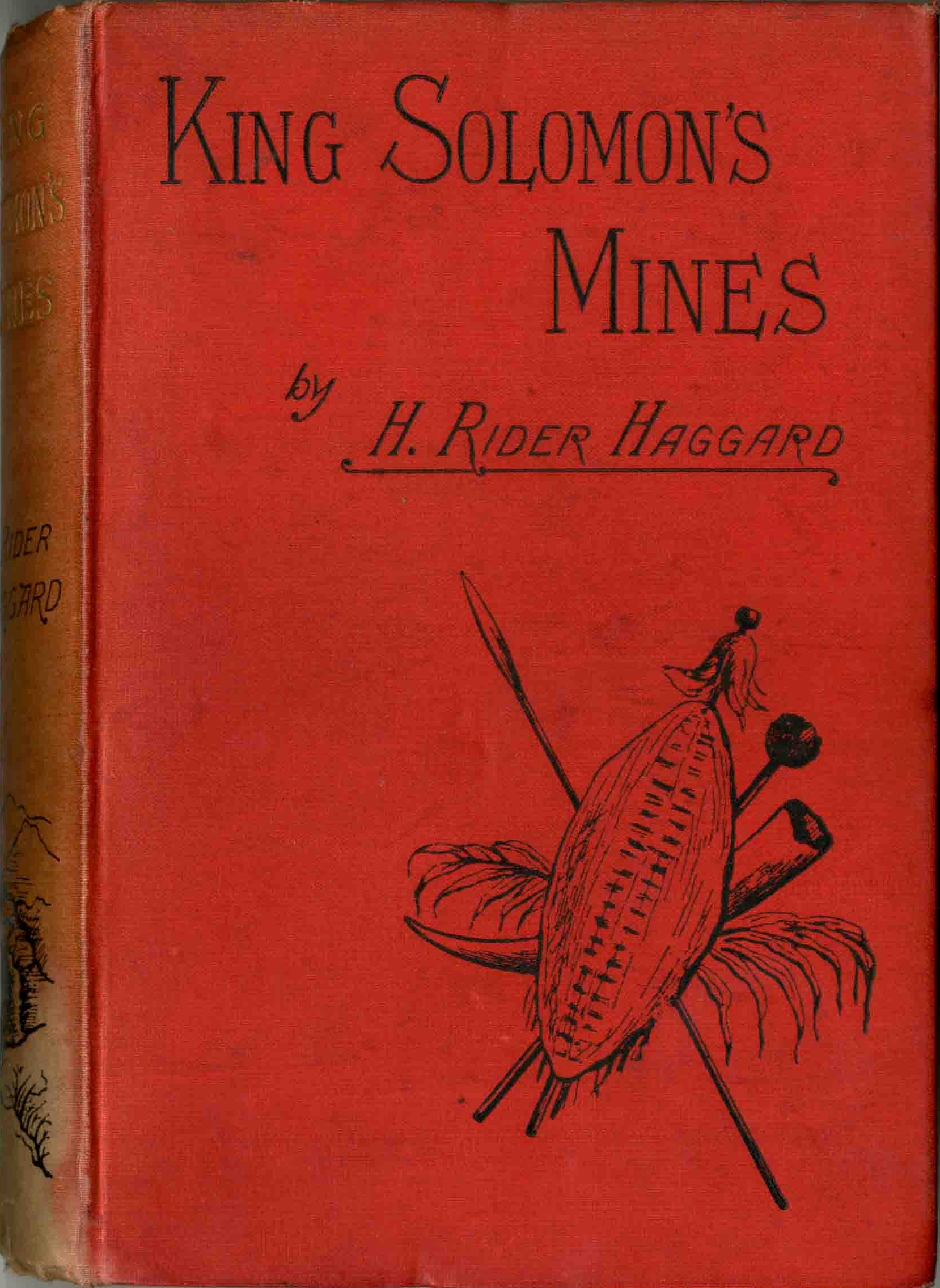
- First edition
- Author: H. Rider Haggard
- Language: English
- Series: Allan Quatermain Series
- Genre: Lost World, Adventure fiction
- Publisher: Cassell and Company
- Publication date: 1885
- Publication place: United Kingdom
- Pages: 320
- Preceded by: The Witch's Head
- Followed by: She: A History of Adventure
- Text: King Solomon's Mines at Wikisource

King Solomon's Mines is an 1885 popular novel by the English Victorian adventure writer and fabulist H. Rider Haggard. Published by Cassell and Company, it tells of an expedition through an unexplored region of Africa by a group of adventurers led by Allan Quatermain, searching for the missing brother of one of the party. It is one of the first English adventure novels set in Africa and is considered to be the genesis of the lost world literary genre. It is the first of fourteen novels and four short stories by Haggard about Allan Quatermain.

== Background ==
The book was first published in September 1885 amid considerable fanfare, with billboards and posters around London announcing "The Most Amazing Book Ever Written." It became an immediate best seller. By the late 19th century, explorers were uncovering ancient civilisations and their remains around the world, such as Egypt's Valley of the Kings and the empire of Assyria. Inner Africa remained largely unexplored and King Solomon's Mines, one of the first novels of African adventure published in English, captured the public's imagination.

The "King Solomon" of the book's title is the legendary Biblical king renowned both for his wisdom and for his wealth. A number of sites have been suggested as the location of his mines, including the workings at the Timna valley near Eilat, Israel. Research published in September 2013 has shown that this site was in use during the 10th century BC as a copper mine possibly by the Edomites, who, the Bible reports, were rivals of and frequently at war with King Solomon. The Bible does refer to King Solomon having sent out, in partnership with his Phoenician allies, trading expeditions along the Red Sea, which brought exotic wares and animals from Africa to Jerusalem. Muslim traders in Sofala, Mozambique, told Portuguese travellers in the sixteenth and seventeenth centuries that the region's gold mines belonged to King Solomon and that he built the now-ruined city of Great Zimbabwe.

Haggard knew Africa well, having travelled deep within the continent during the Anglo-Zulu War and the First Boer War, where he had been impressed by South Africa's vast mineral wealth and by the ruins of ancient lost cities, such as Great Zimbabwe, being uncovered. His original Allan Quatermain character was based in large part on Frederick Selous, the British white hunter and explorer of Africa. Selous's real-life experiences provided Haggard with the background and inspiration for this and many later stories.

Haggard also owed a considerable literary debt to Joseph Thomson, the Scottish explorer whose book Through Masai Land was published in 1885. Thomson claimed he had terrified warriors in Kenya by taking out his false teeth and claiming to be a magician. Haggard has his character Captain Good do the same in King Solomon's Mines. Contemporary James Runciman wrote an article entitled King Plagiarism and His Court, interpreted as accusing Haggard of plagiarism for this. Thomson was so outraged at Haggard's alleged plagiarism that he published a novel of his own, Ulu: an African Romance, which, however, failed to sell.

== Plot ==
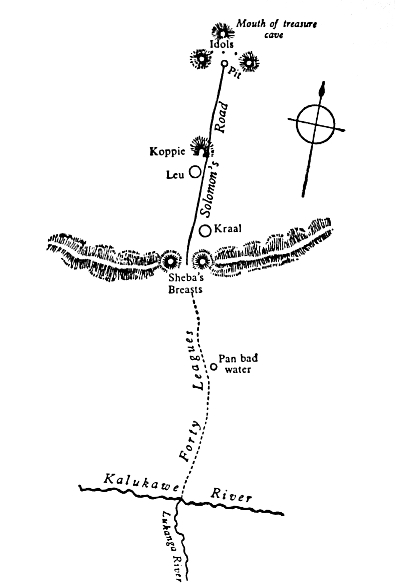
The way to Kukuanaland

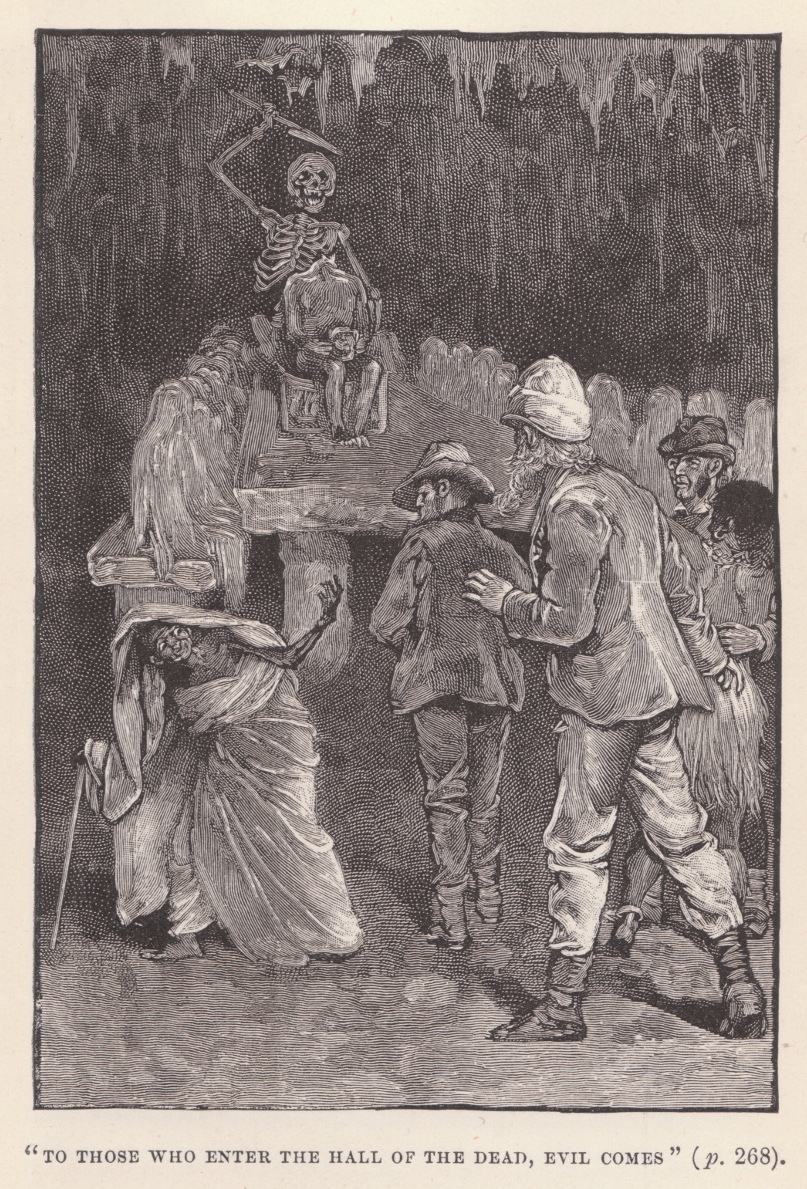
"To those who enter the hall of the dead, evil comes"; Walter Paget

Adventurer Allan Quatermain, a white hunter based in the African city of Durban, (Note: Located in what is now South Africa.) is approached by aristocrat Sir Henry Curtis and his friend Captain Good, seeking his help finding Sir Henry's brother, who was last seen travelling north into the unexplored interior on a quest for the fabled King Solomon's Mines. Quatermain has a map purporting to lead to the mines, but had never taken it seriously. He agrees to lead an expedition in return for a share of the treasure, or a stipend for his son if he is killed along the way. He has little hope they will return alive, but reasons that he has already outlived most people in his profession, so dying in this manner at least ensures his son will be provided for. They also take along a native, Umbopa, who seems more regal and well-spoken than most porters of his class, but who is anxious to join the party.

Travelling by oxcart, they reach the edge of a desert, but not before a hunt in which a wounded elephant claims the life of a servant. They continue on foot across the desert, almost dying of thirst before finding the oasis shown halfway across on the map. Reaching a mountain range called Suliman Berg, they climb a peak (one of "Sheba's Breasts"), enter a cave and find the frozen corpse of José Silvestre, (Note: Also spelt Silvestra.) the 16th-century Portuguese explorer who drew the map in his own blood. That night, another servant dies from the cold, and they leave his body next to Silvestra's. They cross the mountains into Kukuanaland, a raised valley, lush and green. The inhabitants have a well-organised army and society and speak an ancient dialect of IsiZulu. Kukuanaland's capital is Loo, the destination of a road from ancient times. The city is dominated by a central royal kraal.

A party of Kukuana warriors are about to kill them when Captain Good nervously fidgets with his false teeth, making the Kukuanas recoil in fear. Thereafter, to protect themselves, they style themselves "white men from the stars"—sorcerer-gods—and are required to give regular proof of their divinity, considerably straining both their nerves and their ingenuity.

They are brought before King Twala, a vicious leader. He came to power years before by murdering his brother, the previous king, and driving his brother's wife and infant son, Ignosi, out into the desert to die. Twala's rule is unchallenged. Gagool, an impossibly ancient hag, is his chief advisor. She roots out any potential opposition by ordering regular witch hunts and murdering without trial all those identified as traitors. When she singles out Umbopa for this fate, it takes all of Quatermain's skill to save his life.

Gagool, it appears, has already sensed what Umbopa later reveals: he is Ignosi, the rightful king of the Kukuanas. A rebellion breaks out, the Englishmen gaining support for Ignosi by taking advantage of their foreknowledge of a lunar eclipse to claim that they will black out the moon as proof of Ignosi's claim. (Note: In early editions, this was a solar eclipse; Haggard changed it after realising that his description of a solar eclipse was not realistic.) The Englishmen join Ignosi's army in a furious battle. Although outnumbered, the rebels overthrow Twala, and Sir Henry lops off his head in a duel.

The Englishmen also capture Gagool, who reluctantly leads them to King Solomon's Mines. She shows them a treasure room carved inside a mountain, full of gold, diamonds, and ivory. She then sneaks out while they are admiring the hoard and triggers a secret mechanism that closes the mine's stone door. However, a scuffle with Foulata— a Kukuana woman who became attached to Good after nursing him through his injuries sustained in the battle—causes Gagool to be crushed under the door, though not before fatally stabbing Foulata. Their scant store of food and water dwindling, the trapped men prepare to die also. After some despairing days sealed in the dark chamber, they find an escape route, bringing with them a few pocketfuls of diamonds from the trove, enough to make them rich.

The Englishmen bid farewell to a sorrowful Ignosi and return to the desert, assuring him that they value his friendship but must return to be with their own people, Ignosi in return promising them that they will be venerated and honoured among his people forever. Taking a different route, they find Sir Henry's brother stranded in an oasis by a broken leg, unable to go forward or back. They all return to Durban and, eventually, back to England, wealthy enough to live out their lives in comfort.

== Literary significance and criticism ==
Haggard's autobiography states he wrote King Solomon's Mines as the result of reading "in one of the weekly papers a notice of Stevenson's Treasure Island [1883] so laudatory that I procured and studied the work, and was impelled by its perusal to try to write a book for boys". According to James Milne's 1934 Memoirs of a Bookman, Haggard made a bet with his brother "to prove it possible for someone, not at all known in authorship, to do a 'thriller' as successful as 'Treasure Island'". Although Haggard's autobiography claims that he wrote the novel "in about six weeks", his notebooks show that he wrote it in sixteen weeks between January and 21 April 1885. However, the book was a complete novelty and was rejected by one publisher after another. After six months, King Solomon's Mines was published, and the book became the year's best seller, with printers struggling to print copies fast enough.

Andrew Lang praised the book in that day's Saturday Review, describing it as a "peculiarly thrilling and vigorous tale of adventure" and effusing "we have only praise for the very remarkable and uncommon powers of invention and gift of "vision" which Mr. Haggard displays".

In the process, King Solomon's Mines created a new genre known as the "Lost World", which inspired Edgar Rice Burroughs' The Land That Time Forgot, Arthur Conan Doyle's The Lost World, Rudyard Kipling's The Man Who Would Be King and H. P. Lovecraft's At the Mountains of Madness. In The Return of Tarzan (1913), Edgar Rice Burroughs introduced his own lost city of Opar (supposedly the same as the Biblical Ophir with which King Solomon traded), in which the influence of King Solomon's Mines is evident. Opar reappeared in further Tarzan novels and was later taken up in the Khokarsa novels of Philip José Farmer and various derivative works in other media. Burroughs also introduced other lost cities in various hidden corners of Africa for Tarzan to visit, such as a valley in Tarzan, Lord of the Jungle inhabited by stray Crusaders still maintaining a medieval way of life. Robert E. Howard's Conan the Barbarian also visited several lost cities, and Lee Falk's The Phantom was initially written in this genre. A much later Lost World novel is Michael Crichton's Congo, which is set in the 1970s and features characters seeking a trove of diamonds in the lost city of Zinj for use in electronic components rather than jewelry.

As in Treasure Island, the narrator of King Solomon's Mines tells his tale in the first person, in an easy conversational style. Almost entirely missing (except in the speech of the Kukuanas) is the ornate language usually associated with novels of this era. Haggard's use of the first-person subjective perspective also contrasts with the omniscient third-person viewpoint then in vogue among influential writers such as Anthony Trollope, Thomas Hardy, and George Eliot.

The book has scholarly value for the colonialist attitudes that Haggard expresses, and for the way that he portrays the relationships between the white and African characters. Haggard portrays some African characters, such as Twala and Gagool, as barbarians but their barbarity has more to do with their roles as antagonists in the story than with their African heritage. He also presents the other side of the coin, showing some black Africans (such as Ignosi) as heroes and heroines, and shows respect for their culture. The book expresses much less prejudice than some of the later books in this genre. Indeed, Quatermain stated that he refused to use the word "nigger" and that many Africans are more worthy of the title of "gentleman" than the Europeans who settle or adventure in the country. Haggard even included an interracial romance between a Kukuana woman, Foulata, and the white Englishman Captain Good. The narrator tries to discourage the relationship, dreading the uproar that such a marriage would cause back home; however, he has no objection to the lady, whom he considers very beautiful and noble. Haggard eventually kills off Foulata, who dies in Good's arms.

Kukuanaland is said in the book to be forty leagues north of the Lukanga river, in modern-day Zambia, which would place it in the extreme southeast of the present Democratic Republic of Congo. The culture of the Kukuanas shares many attributes with the Zulus, such as the Zulu language being spoken and the kraal system being used.

== Adaptations in other media ==
=== Films ===
The novel has been adapted to film at least seven times. The first cinema adaptation (a silent film version) was directed by Horace Lisle Lucoque in 1919 (now lost), followed by the first sound version in 1937, King Solomon's Mines, which was directed by Robert Stevenson. The best known version premiered in 1950, King Solomon's Mines, directed by Compton Bennett and Andrew Marton, which was followed by a sequel, Watusi (1959). In 1979, a low-budget version was directed by Alvin Rakoff, King Solomon's Treasure, combining both King Solomon's Mines as well as Allan Quatermain in one story. The 1985 film, King Solomon's Mines, was a more tongue-in-cheek parody of the story, followed by a sequel in the same vein: Allan Quatermain and the Lost City of Gold (1987). Around the same period, an Australian animated TV film came out, King Solomon's Mines. In December 2006, the movie, The Librarian: Return to King Solomon's Mines was released as the second in a trilogy that follows one man's fantastical adventures. In 2008, a direct-to-video adaptation, Allan Quatermain and the Temple of Skulls was released by Mark Atkins, which bore more resemblance to Indiana Jones than the novel.

=== Comics ===
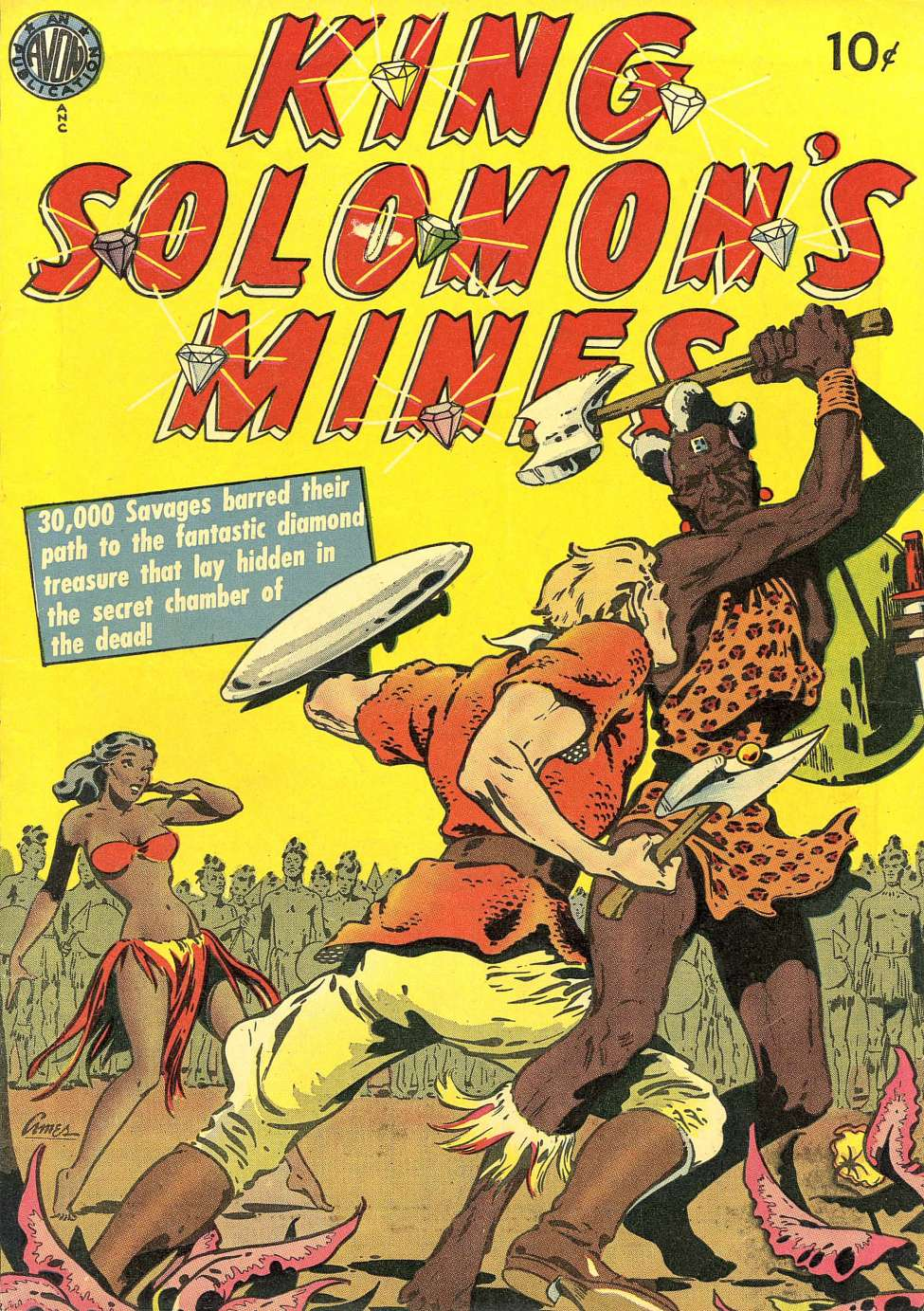
Cover art from King Solomon's Mines, Avon Periodicals, 1951, art by Lee J. Ames.

- In 1951, Avon Periodicals published a comic book adaptation.
- In 1952, a comic adaptation was published in Classics Illustrated #97, scripted by Kenneth W. Fitch and with drawings by H. C. Kiefer.
- In 1954, British comics artist Dudley D. Watkins adapted the story into a text comics series.
- In 2015, artist Pablo Marcos and writer Mark Ellis reimagined King Solomon's Mines as a graphic novel published by Ying Ko Graphics.

=== Television programs ===
In 2004, King Solomon's Mines, a two-part TV mini-series starring Patrick Swayze as Allan Quatermain, aired on the Hallmark Channel.

=== Radio ===
Kenneth Colley starred as Allan Quatermain in a 1990 BBC Radio 4 adaptation.

A two-part BBC Radio 4 adaptation was broadcast in April 2017 starring Tim McInnerny as Allan Quatermain.

"King Solomon's Mines" was the sixth episode of The General Mills Radio Adventure Theater, broadcast on 20 February 1977.
