= The Search for King Solomon's Mines =

The Search for King Solomon's Mines is a documentary film based on the trail followed in Tahir Shah's 2002 book In Search of King Solomon's Mines. After the initial journeys through Ethiopia that resulted in Shah's book, he returned to the country with a film crew commissioned by National Geographic and Britain's Channel 4, to bring the search for the fabled mines to television. As a travel writer, having a film crew accompany him for the first time was a new experience for Shah. His work in researching books usually involves low-key methods of gaining information and making contacts.

For years, explorers have scoured the known world for the source of King Solomon's vast wealth. The Bible's king built a temple in Jerusalem that was said to be adorned with an abundance of gold. It was described as the most spectacular landmark of the ancient world. For Shah, the obvious place to begin the search was in Ethiopia. His journey took him to a remote cliff-face monastery, to the ruined castles of Gondar, and to the rock hewn churches at Lalibela. Farther south, Shah discovered a massive illegal gold mine, with thousands of men, women and children digging with their hands. The most difficult leg of the journey was to the "cursed mountain" of Mount Welel, where legend places an ancient mine shaft, once the entrance to Solomon's own mines.

The film (which was made by Double Exposure Limited, London) has both supporters and critics. On his personal website, Shah stated that "one point that is important to this and the other documentaries I have made, is that I fall over backwards to show it like it is -- or was. The journeys which form the books and films I end up producing are all too often hard as hell. Tempers fray. Abuses fly. Covering all that up is, I believe, a grand mistake... so for my part I asked that it was all left in. The result is a piece of film making on the edge."
