= The Middle East Bedside Book =

- First UK edition cover
- Author: Tahir Shah
- Illustrator: Tahir Shah (photos)
- Language: English
- Subject: Folklore, Reference
- Published: 1991 The Octagon Press
- Pages: 287 pp.
- ISBN: 978-0863040351
- Preceded by: Cultural Research
- Followed by: Beyond the Devil's Teeth

The Middle East Bedside Book is a collection of stories and information about the Middle East, edited by Anglo-Afghan author, Tahir Shah. The book was published in June 1991 by The Octagon Press.

== Overview ==
The Middle East Bedside Book contains a treasury of proverbs, etiquette, information and ideas to have come out of the Middle East, and Arab culture. Shah's standing as someone who straddles the East and the West enables him to see both societies in a way that others are unable to observe. Among the material included are teaching stories on the subjects of chivalry at honor, bravery and courage, such as the Tale of Hatim Tai. There is mention, too, that King Offa of Mercia struck a gold dinar (now found in London's British Museum) stating in Arabic the epithet, 'There is no god but Allah'. The collection also shows that Chaucer, Shakespeare, Dante and others drew upon Arab sources in their work.

== Reception ==
Talking about both Tahir Shah's The Middle East Bedside Book and Safia Shah's Afghan Caravan, Nobel prize-winning author Doris Lessing writes in The Sufis and Idries Shah: "Both are full of delights; there is a great deal that is surprising; and, as with all books from that source, we are reminded of a generosity and largeness of mind in a culture that once, long ago, gave us the concept of chivalry."
