= Beyond the Devil's Teeth =

- First edition cover
- Author: Tahir Shah
- Illustrator: Tahir Shah (photos)
- Language: English
- Subject: Gondwanaland, India, Africa, Latin America
- Genre: Travel
- Published: April 1995 Octagon Press
- Pages: 360 pp.
- ISBN: 978-0863040290
- OCLC: 47719962
- Preceded by: The Middle East Bedside Book
- Followed by: Sorcerer's Apprentice (book)

Beyond the Devil's Teeth is a travel book by Anglo-Afghan author, Tahir Shah. The text was published in April 1995 by Octagon Press.

== Overview ==
Forty-five million years ago, Gondwanaland split apart to form India, Africa and South America. Spellbound by the ancient myth of the Gonds who inhabited a fragment of the supercontinent, Tahir Shah decided to follow their path through India and Pakistan, to Uganda and Rwanda, Kenya and Liberia, before crossing the Atlantic Ocean for Brazil, and the Patagonian glaciers.

Roughing it for most of the journey, Shah shared his travels and his tales with a mix of eccentric and entertaining characters, from Osman and Prideep, Mumbai's answer to Laurel and Hardy, to Oswaldo Rodiguez Oswaldo, a well-turned-out Patagonian.

== Release ==
Beyond the Devil's Teeth was Shah's first mainstream travel book. Although received well by the critics, it is less crafted as his later works, such as The Caliph's House and In Arabian Nights. In a note on his own website, Shah describes how he set up his own agency called Worldwide Media Limited—and masqueraded as an agent called William Watkins—in order to sell the book: it was a ruse that worked. The book sold to the distinguished British publisher Weidenfeld and Nicolson, and paved the way for a host of other works.

== Reviews ==
- Review of Beyond the Devil's Teeth on ShiaChat
- Review of Beyond the Devil's Teeth on Wordsbody
