= Getting Stoned with Savages =

2006 book by J. Maarten Troost

Getting Stoned with Savages: A Trip Through the Islands of Fiji and Vanuatu
- Author: J. Maarten Troost
- Language: English
- Genre: Non-fiction
- Publication date: 2006
- ISBN: 0767921992

Getting Stoned with Savages: A Trip Through the Islands of Fiji and Vanuatu is a 2006 non-fiction travelogue by J. Maarten Troost.

== Summary ==
Following a job at the World Bank, Troost longs for his times spent in Kiribati and leaves the United States with his wife. The book is a humorous account of the author and his wife's time on the Pacific island nations of Vanuatu and Fiji. It is a follow-up to Troost's first work The Sex Lives of Cannibals.

== Reception ==
Critical reception for the book has been positive.

Kirkus Reviews said of the travel essays, "Living on a South Pacific island could be grim, horrifying and revolting, Troost writes, but never less than interesting."

Publishers Weekly mentioned it was a comic masterwork of travel writing.”
