= Devils Tooth (Idaho) =

Mountain in Idaho, United States

Coordinates: 45°20′34″N 116°32′21″W

Devils Tooth is a summit in Idaho County, Idaho, in the United States. With an elevation of 7,598 feet (2,316 m), Devils Tooth is the 762nd highest summit in the state of Idaho.

Devils Tooth was named from Nez Perce mythology.
