= J. Maarten Troost =

American writer (born 1969)

- Born: Jan Maarten Troost; 1969 (age 56–57); Groningen, Netherlands
- Occupation: Travel writer
- Writing career
- Genre: Travel
- Notable works: The Sex Lives of Cannibals, Getting Stoned with Savages, Lost on Planet China, Headhunters on my Doorstep

Jan Maarten Troost (known professionally as J. Maarten Troost; born 1969) is a Dutch-American travel writer and essayist.

== Career ==
Troost is the author of a South Pacific trilogy - The Sex Lives of Cannibals (2004), Getting Stoned with Savages (2006), and Headhunters on my Doorstep (2013) - as well as a book about contemporary China - Lost on Planet China: One Man's Attempt to Understand the World's Most Mystifying Nation (2008). His essays have appeared in The Atlantic Monthly, The Los Angeles Times, The Washington Post, Islands Magazine, The Cimarron Review, National Geographic Traveler and the Huffington Post.

Troost's first book, The Sex Lives of Cannibals, was a finalist for the Barnes and Noble Discover Great New Writers Award for Non-Fiction. It has also been listed as one of the 25 Books to Remember by the New York Public Library, one of the 50 Greatest Travel Books of all Time by the Matador Network and others, and one of the 15 Funniest Travel Books Ever Written by CNN. Lost on Planet China was recognized as an Amazon Best of the Month Selection in August, 2008, while The New York Times and Booklist called Headhunters on my Doorstep one of the top travel books of 2013.

His books have been translated into six languages.

From 1992 to 1994, Troost worked as a correspondent for The Prague Post, where he wrote about everything from the dissolution of Czechoslovakia to the war in Bosnia-Herzegovina. He has also worked as a consultant to the World Bank.

== Personal life ==
Troost was born in Groningen, The Netherlands in 1969, and is of Dutch-Czech descent. He was educated at Boston University (B.A.) and The George Washington University (M.A.). He has lived in the Netherlands, Canada, the Czech Republic, Kiribati, Vanuatu, Fiji, and the United States, where, after a long stint in California, he presently resides in the Washington, D.C. metropolitan area with his wife and children.

== Books ==
- The Sex Lives of Cannibals (2004)
- Getting Stoned with Savages (2006)
- Lost on Planet China (2008)
- Headhunters on My Doorstep (2013)
- I Was Told There'd Be Sexbots: Travels Through the Future (anticipated publication summer 2017; not released as of April 2022.)
