= The Sex Lives of Cannibals =

2004 book by J. Maarten Troost

- Author: J. Maarten Troost
- Language: English
- Genre: Non-fiction
- Publication date: 2004

The Sex Lives of Cannibals: Adrift in the Equatorial Pacific is a 2004 non-fiction travelog by author J. Maarten Troost describing the two years he and his girlfriend spent living on Tarawa, Kiribati.

== Plot ==
In the book, Troost described how he and his girlfriend, Sylvia, adjusted to life on the remote small island in the South Pacific, and built a life for themselves there. Troost described the unusual people they lived with, and the bizarre and unfamiliar local customs. He also details the islanders' reaction to Troost's own behaviour that they regarded as unusual.

In those two years, the author adjusted to an overwhelming fish-based diet, extreme heat, and an ineffective government, which the author describes as "Coconut Stalinism - though Stalin, at least, got something done." He described frequent electrical and water shortages, along with many other idiosyncrasies of living on such a small and remote island.

At the same time, Troost also challenges American complacency toward its own history, particularly the inadequate remembrance of the many troops who died in the Battle of Tarawa during World War II. He also criticizes the many foreign aid workers and consultants, who failed to consider the islanders' real needs or local culture.

== Sequel ==
This book was followed up by Getting Stoned with Savages (2006), the further adventures of J. Maarten Troost and his wife, Sylvia.
