= Sorcerer's Apprentice (Shah book) =

- First US edition cover
- Author: Tahir Shah
- Illustrator: Tahir Shah (photos)
- Language: English
- Subject: India, magic, folklore
- Genre: Travel
- Publisher: Weidenfeld and Nicolson
- Publication date: 1998
- ISBN: 1-55970-580-9
- OCLC: 46422213
- Dewey Decimal: 793.8/092 B 21
- LC Class: GV1545.S29 A3 2001
- Preceded by: Beyond the Devil's Teeth
- Followed by: Trail of Feathers
- Editions: French, Italian, German, Spanish, Indian, US, Czech

Sorcerer's Apprentice is a travel book by Anglo-Afghan author, Tahir Shah.

== Synopsis ==
The book is Shah's account of his travels throughout India and his meeting with godmen, sadhus, and street sorcerers. He had embarked on the trip to locate an Indian illusionist who he had met as a boy in rural England and from whom he had learned magic tricks. The illusionist had been assigned as a guardian to Shah's great-grandfather's tomb. On his trip, he met a variety of such characters, many of whom run confidence tricks and scams.

== Reviews ==
- Review of Sorcerer's Apprentice and other Shah books on Mondo Ernesto
- Review from April 15, 2001 on Kirkus Reviews
- Review of Sorcerer's Apprentice on All About India
- Review of Sorcerer's Apprentice on Publishers Weekly
