= Sam Miller (journalist) =

- Born: 1962 (age 63–64); London, England
- Education: Cambridge University
- Alma mater: School of Oriental and African Studies, University of London
- Occupations: Journalist, writer
- Children: 2

Sam Miller is a journalist and writer whose first book Delhi: Adventures in a Megacity was published by Penguin India in January 2009. The book was also published in the United Kingdom by Jonathan Cape. Since then he has written several other books. These include A Strange Kind of Paradise: India Through Foreign Eyes (2014), a history of foreign attitudes toward India, and Fathers (2017), a family memoir. He also translated The Marvellous (but Authentic) Adventures of Captain Corcoran by Alfred Assollant (2017). His latest book is Migrants: The Story of Us All (2023), an alternative history of the world, in which migration is restored to the heart of the human story.

Sam Miller was born in London in 1962. He studied history at Cambridge University and politics at the School of Oriental and African Studies, University of London, before joining BBC World Service. In the early nineties he was the BBC's TV and radio correspondent in New Delhi and on his return to the UK in 1993 was the presenter and editor off the BBC's current affairs programme South Asia Report. Later he became the head of the Urdu service and subsequently Managing Editor, South Asia. He has also worked as a BBC reporter in Pakistan, Afghanistan, Bangladesh, the Balkans and Northern Ireland, and, most recently, as Country Director for BBC Media Action in India, Tanzania, Nigeria, Tunisia, Afghanistan, Cambodia and Ethiopia.

He contributed a chapter to The Weekenders: Adventures in Calcutta (Ebury Press, 2004), along with Irvine Welsh, Bella Bathurst, Colm Toibin, Andrew O'Hagan and Monica Ali.

He has two children, Zubin Miller and Roxana (Roxy) Miller.

He is also the author of Blue Guide India, a guide for the independent traveler to India's art, architecture and history.
