= Delhi: Adventures in a Megacity =

2009 book by Sam Miller

- First edition
- Author: Sam Miller
- Language: English
- Subject: Delhi
- Genre: Travel
- Publisher: Penguin Books India
- Publication date: 2009
- Publication place: India
- ISBN: 9780099526742

Delhi: Adventures in a Megacity is a 2009 book by British-born, Indian-based writer Sam Miller.

== Background and synopsis ==
Delhi: Adventures in a Megacity is a portrayal of one of the fastest-growing cities in the world; following Miller's encounters with the people of the city - from a professor of astrophysics to a crematorium attendant, from ragpickers to members of the Police Brass Band.

Miller, who has lived in the city since 2002, visits Delhi's less celebrated destinations; the unexpected, the ignored and the eccentric, and seeks to depict the city in "all its humour and humanity". Miller portrays the city as a blending of past and future, East and West, rich and poor.

== Reception ==
In The Christian Science Monitor the book is described as a "loosely spun, multifaceted travelogue" which "puts all Delhi's bizarre charm and extremes on full display" and "will resonate with...anyone wanting a glimpse of one of the world's fastest growing metropolises."

Writing for The Independent Peter Carty praises Miller's book as an "engaging and innovative account" which "draws upon psychogeographic techniques" and which shows Delhi is not "lacking the vitality" it is often thought to. Carty writes that Miller presents "a hugely eclectic variety of experiences" showing the extraordinary diversity of the city.
