= James Runciman =

English teacher, author and journalist

James Runciman (August, 1852 – 6 July 1891) was an English teacher, author and journalist.

He was born at Cresswell, a village near Morpeth in Northumberland, son of Walter Runciman, a coastguardman, and Jean Finlay. He was educated at Ellington school, and then for two years (1863–65) in the naval school at Greenwich, Kent, becoming afterwards a pupil-teacher at North Shields ragged school. After an interval spent at the British and Foreign School Society's Training College for Teachers in the Borough Road (Borough Road College, which later moved to Isleworth), he entered the service of the London School Board, acting as master successively of schools at Hale Street, Deptford, at South Street, Greenwich and at Blackheath Hill.

While still a schoolmaster, he read for himself at night, and attempted journalism. He soon wrote regularly for The Teacher, The Schoolmaster, and Vanity Fair; of the last paper he became sub-editor in 1874. In January 1874, he matriculated at the University of London, and passed the first bachelor of science examination in 1876. About 1880, while continuing his school-work, he was sub-editor of London, a short-lived newspaper, edited by W. E. Henley.

Subsequently he confined himself solely to the profession of journalism. As a writer on social or ethical topics, he proved himself equally vigorous and versatile, but his best literary work described the life of the fishermen of the North Sea, with whom he spent many of his vacations.

A series of seafaring sketches, which he contributed to the St. James's Gazette, was reprinted as 'The Romance of the Coast'. He dedicated his 'Dream of the North Sea', a vivid account of the fishermen's perils, to Queen Victoria, who accepted the dedication. He died prematurely, of overwork, at Tyneside, Minerva Road, Kingston upon Thames, Surrey.

== Bibliography of works by Runciman ==
- The Romance of the Coast, 1883.
- Grace Balmaign's Sweetheart, 1885.
- Skippers and Shellbacks, 1885.
- School Board Idylls, 1887.
- Schools and Scholars, 1887.
- The Chequers, being the Natural History of a Public House set forth in a Loafer's Diary, 1888.
- A Dream of the North Sea, 1889,
- Joints in our Social Armour, 1890; reprinted as The Ethics of Drink and Social Questions, or Joints in our Social Armour, 1892.
- Side Lights, with Memoir by Grant Allen, and Introduction by W. T. Stead; edited by J. F. Runciman, 1893.
