= In Search of King Solomon's Mines =

2002 book by Tahir Shah

- Second edition cover
- Author: Tahir Shah
- Illustrator: Tahir Shah (photos)
- Language: English
- Subject: Ethiopia, folklore
- Genre: Travel
- Published: 2002 John Murray
- Pages: 320 pp.
- ISBN: 978-1-84511-698-9
- OCLC: 228197615
- Preceded by: Trail of Feathers
- Followed by: House of the Tiger King

In Search of King Solomon's Mines is a travel book by Anglo-Afghan author, Tahir Shah, relating his travels in Ethiopia with only local people for company and assistance.

== The journeys ==
Shah's search began with a map discovered in a Jerusalem stall which shows a trail leading to the fabled mines of King Solomon in the land of Ophir. The mines have enthralled and tormented all those who searched for them down the centuries and superstition whispers of terrible curses that will befall anyone that finds them. Bewitched by the legends, Tahir Shah decides to take up the quest.

Chasing clues gathered from the Septuagint to ancient folklore, from the copper scroll to the national epic of the Kebra Negast, Shah was led to Ethiopia, whose past rulers traced their descent from the son born to King Solomon and the Queen of Sheba, and from which gold has been exported for millennia. He arrived there at the start of the 21st century, in a period when the impoverished country is still recovering from the violence and disruption of the century before.

In Addis Ababa, Shah engaged the service of Samson, a born-again Christian and former miner. Their first trip was down the Addis Ababa–Djibouti Railway to view the feeding of the hyenas said to guard Solomon's treasure in Harar, then returning by bus and undergoing "the kind of experience that makes you question the purpose of even the most well-intentioned journey". Next, they visited an illegal gold mine near Shakiso, where hundreds of men, women and children toil in "a biblical Hell". The presence of the travellers was betrayed to the local authorities and they were jailed, but then freed by a friendly regional commander. Immediately afterwards, they were allowed to visit the Government's official Lega Dembi Mine.

For his journey round the wild borders of the north, Shah acquired the wrecked shell of the Emperor Haile Selassie's jeep, with the khat-chewing Bahru as chauffeur. First he explored the rock-hewn churches of Lalibela and was shown an ancient cross known as "the Gold of Sheba". Venturing from there among the feared Danakil tribe, he left Bahru to drive to Mekelle and joined a camel caravan back across the desert. Due to the greed of the people of the Afar Region, he was told, God has turned to salt the gold that once abounded there. Somewhere in the region to the north, it is rumoured, are the mines from which the Queen of Shaba derived her gold.

Religious experiences in the north later on included being lifted by rope to view the clifftop Debre Damo monastery; in Axum, Shah met a Rastafarian 'god'; in Gondar one of the few remaining Falashas. Heading southward next through monsoon downpours and swamped roads, the party made for the sinister mountain of Tulu Wallel where, decades before, an English adventurer called Frank Hayter claimed to have discovered the gold mines of King Solomon. Failing to locate the exact site, Shah returned months later to make a fresh attempt but was driven back by the harsh conditions.

== Reception ==
Time's description of the book's style as "simple and elegant, subtly self-deprecating and often hilarious" soon made its way onto the front cover of later editions. Though The New Yorker notes that Shah presents Ethiopia as "a land with all of the ills of modernity and none of its benefits", yet he manages to describe even the most shocking detail with a light touch and imparts information in so entertaining a way that "most readers won't realize that while walking on the wild side, they've also just done a quick course in Ethiopian history."

Though giving due credit to all this, Mary Whipple deprecates Shah's "unfortunate sense of entitlement in his attitudes toward the people around him". A critical study goes further and makes plainer the element of manipulation in the writing, with its tantalising treasure maps, mad sultans and accursed mountains. It derives from H. Rider Haggard's King Solomon's Mines (1885), a widely influential work of fiction that Shah mentions deprecatingly in his own book. The debt to that work, however, and to others derivative from it, is recognised by Richard Pine in his Minor Mythologies as Popular Literature as but "the most recent" example of "the industry" generated by such mythologies.
