= House of the Tiger King =

Travel journal

- Cover of the first UK edition
- Author: Tahir Shah
- Audio read by: Sam Dastor
- Language: English
- Genre: Travel journal
- Set in: Peru
- Publisher: John Murray
- Publication date: 2004
- Publication place: United Kingdom
- Media type: Print
- Pages: 240
- ISBN: 978-0-7195-6611-0
- OCLC: 56465330
- Preceded by: In Search of King Solomon's Mines
- Followed by: The Caliph's House

House of the Tiger King is a travel journal in which Anglo-Afghan author Tahir Shah recounts his search for the legendary Inca city Paititi. The book was first published by John Murray in 2004. Its title is a translation of a Machiguenga name for Paititi.

House of the Tiger King was read by Sam Dastor on BBC Radio 4's Book of the Week in July 2004.

== Overview ==
There is a story that before the Spanish Conquistadors invaded and destroyed the last bastion of the Inca Empire, Vilcabamba, in 1572, the Inca citizens fled from there, and built a magnificent city in a remote part of the cloud forest. Travel writer Tahir Shah, like many before him, seeks this legendary city—Paititi. Shah begins in the Madre de Dios Region of southeastern Peru. Among his party are a Machiguenga guide called Pancho, and Richard Fowler, a wilderness guide hired by Shah for physical security.

The project was also the basis for a documentary feature film of the same name, directed by David Flamholc.
