= Trail of Feathers =

- First UK edition
- Author: Tahir Shah
- Original title: Trail of Feathers
- Illustrator: Tahir Shah (photos)
- Language: English
- Subject: Peru, exploration
- Genre: Travel
- Published: 2001 Weidenfeld & Nicolson
- Pages: 273 pages
- ISBN: 978-1559706131
- Preceded by: Sorcerer's Apprentice (book)
- Followed by: In Search of King Solomon's Mines

Trail of Feathers is a travel book by Tahir Shah, first published in the UK by Weidenfeld & Nicolson in 2001, and in the following year by Arcade Publishing New York. It is subtitled "In search of the birdmen of Peru" and is an account of two interlinked journeys. In the first Shah travels from Machu Picchu to Cusco, and then largely by public transport via Lake Titicaca and Nazca to Lima. From there he flies to Iquitos and sails up the headwaters of the Peruvian Amazon in search of the jungle-dwelling Shuar people to learn from their shamans the secret of human flight.

== Preview ==
- Chapters 1-7 of the Kindle edition
