= In Arabian Nights =

- First US edition cover
- Author: Tahir Shah
- Language: English
- Subject: Morocco, folklore, storytelling
- Genre: Travel
- Publisher: Bantam
- Publication date: 26 December 2007
- Pages: 400 pp.
- ISBN: 978-0553805239
- Preceded by: The Caliph's House
- Followed by: Travels With Myself

In Arabian Nights (subtitled "A caravan of Moroccan dreams") is a travel book by Anglo-Afghan author Tahir Shah illustrated by Laetitia Bermejo. which takes up where his previous book The Caliph's House leaves off, recounting, among much else, events at Dar Khalifa, the Caliph's House, in Casablanca where the Shah family have taken up residence.

== Summary ==
Shah frequents the Café Mabrook, which becomes for him the "gateway into the clandestine world of Moroccan men" and is told "if you really want to get to know us, then root out the raconteurs". He also hears of the Berber tradition that each person searches for the story within their heart.

Events at home are interwoven with Shah's journeys across Morocco, and he sees how the Kingdom of Morocco has a substratum of oral tradition that is almost unchanged in a thousand years, a culture in which tales, as well as entertaining, are a matrix through which values, ideas and information are transmitted.

Shah listens to anyone who has a tale to tell. He encounters professional storytellers, a junk merchant who sells his wares for nothing, but insists on a high payment for the tale attached to each item and a door to door salesman who can obtain anything, including, when Shah requests the first "Benares" edition of A Thousand and One Nights by Richard Burton, a translation that the author's father Idries Shah had once given away. As he makes his way through the labyrinthine medinas of Fez and Marrakesh, traverses the Sahara sands, and tastes the hospitality of ordinary Moroccans, he collects a treasury of stories, gleaned from the heritage of A Thousand and One Nights. The tales, recounted by a vivid cast of characters, reveal fragments of wisdom and an oriental way of thinking.

Weaving in and out of the narrative are Shah's recollection of his family's first visits to Morocco and his father, Idries Shah's storytelling and insistence that traditional tales contain vastly undervalued resources; "We are a family of storytellers. Don't forget it. We have a gift. Protect it and it will protect you." As a father himself Shah now passes the baton on to his own children.

== Reviews ==
- Maclean, Rory (2 June 2008). "Morocco: true stories". The Guardian.
- Stroud, Clover (2 June 2008). "Travel books: In Arabian Nights by Tahir Shah". The Telegraph.
- Thomson, Hugh (23 May 2008). "In Arabian Nights, by Tahir Shah". The Independent.
- Review in The Bookbag
- Review in A.V Club
- Review in The Seattle Times
- Review in Frequency of Words
- Review in Kirkus Reviews
- Review in Armchair Archives
- Review in the Journal of the 1001 Nights
- Review in Lotus Reads
- Review in The Storytellers Web
- Review in Seagreen Reader
- Review in Friends of Books
- Review in National Geographic Intelligent Travel Blog
- Review in Directions for getting lost
- Review in Shvoong
- Review in Travel Book Mix
- Review in Al Bab: Impressions of a Middle East past and present
- Review in Outlook Traveller
- Review in Levantine Dreamhouse
- Review in Adventure Collection
- Review in Books to Travel With
- Review in Critic Globe
- Review in Book Buzz
- Review in Kate's Books
- Review in LyzzyBee's Books
- Review in Provo Library Staff Reviews
- Review in White Noise of Everyday Life
- Review in World Hum
- Review in Jov's Book Pyramid
- Review in At Home with Books
- Review in Publishers Weekly
