= Tahir Shah =

British author, journalist and documentary maker

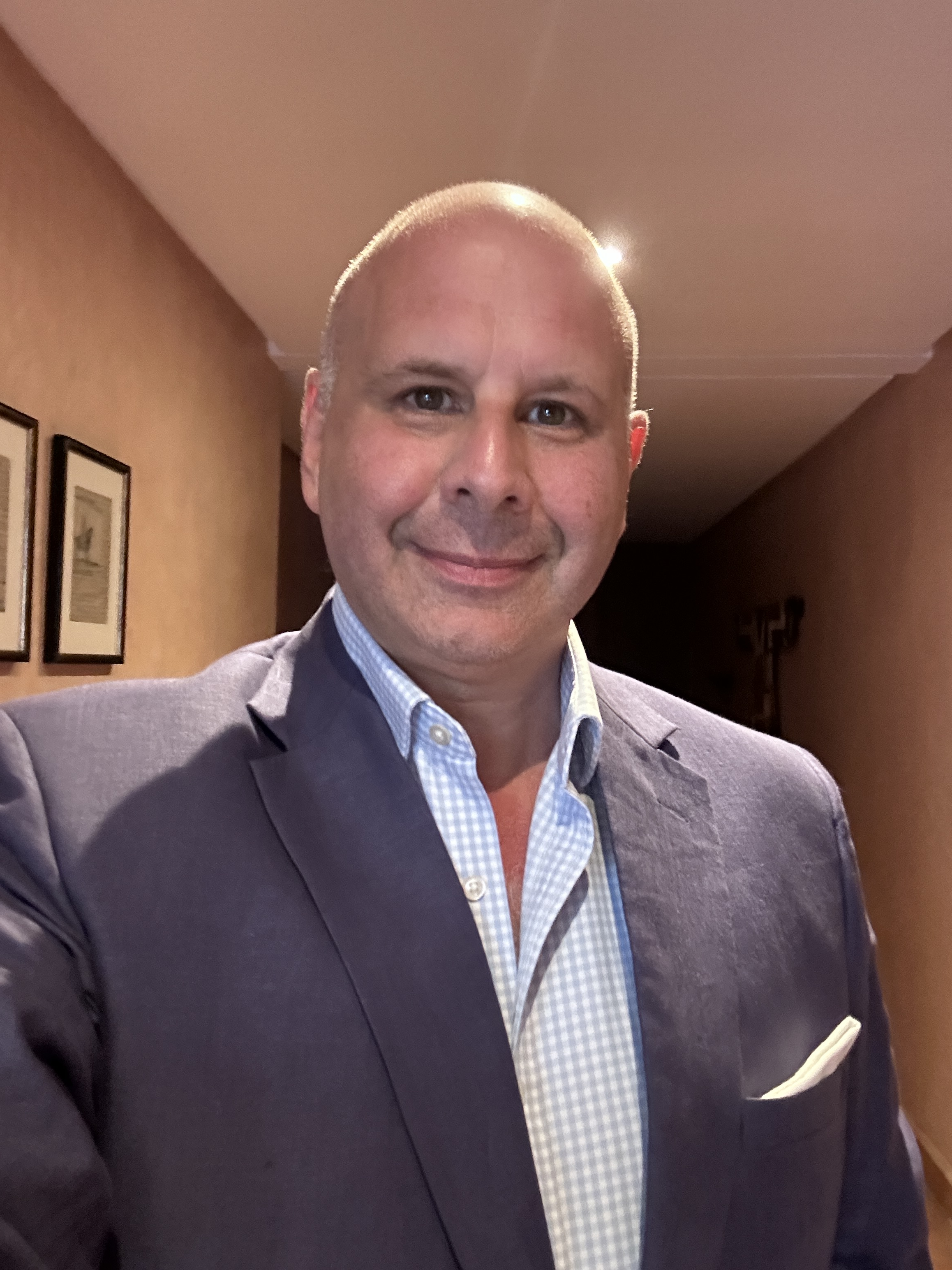
- Shah in 2024
- Born: 16 November 1966 (age 59); London, England, United Kingdom
- Occupations: Writer, documentary maker
- Children: 2
- Relatives: Shah family
- Writing career
- Subjects: Travel, exploration, Arab World, cross-cultural studies
- Website: tahirshah.com

Tahir Shah (Persian: طاهر شاه, Gujarati: તાહિર શાહ; né Sayyid Tahir al-Hashimi (Arabic: سيد طاهر الهاشمي); born 16 November 1966) is a British author, journalist and documentary maker of Afghan-Indian descent.

== Family ==
Tahir Shah was born into the saadat of Paghman, an ancient and respected family hailing from Afghanistan. Bestowed with further lands and ancestral titles by the British Raj during the Great Game, a number of Shah's more recent ancestors were born in the principality of Sardhana, in northern India – which they ruled as Nawabs.

His mother, Cynthia Kabraji, was of Zoroastrian Parsi descent and his father was the Indian Sufi teacher and writer Idries Shah. Both his grandfathers were respected literary figures in their own right: Sirdar Ikbal Ali Shah on his father's side, and the Indian poet Fredoon Kabraji, on his mother's side. His elder sister is the documentary filmmaker Saira Shah, and his twin sister is the author Safia Nafisa Shah. Numerous other members of Shah's family have been successful authors, including his aunt Amina Shah, and his Scottish grandmother Elizabeth Louise MacKenzie.

Shah is descended from the Afghan warlord and statesman Jan-Fishan Khan. In 1995 Shah married the India-born graphic designer Rachana Shah (née Devidayal), with whom he has two children – Ariane Shah and Timur Shah. The marriage ended in 2017, although the two remain close friends.

== Childhood ==
Shah was born in London and brought up in Langton House a Georgian country house in the Kent village of Langton Green. The property had been owned previously by the family of Robert, Lord Baden-Powell, founder of the'Boy Scout Movement. Shah has described how, as a child, he played in the woods which are said to have first interested Baden-Powell in the outdoors.

Shah's father, the writer and thinker Idries Shah, surrounded himself with a diverse coterie of people, most of whom were interested in his published work. They included Nobel Laureate Doris Lessing, poet Robert Graves, American novelists J. D. Salinger and Lisa Alther, psychologist Robert E. Ornstein, as well as the pioneer of radar "Coppy" Laws, the garden designer Russell Page, and the actor Walter Gotell. Shah maintains that much of his education derived from spending time with such a varied group of people.

His first appearance on television was in the 1972 BBC documentary about his father, Dream Walkers: One Pair of Eyes, in which Shah, his sisters, and their friends, are seen listening to Idries Shah tell the tale of The Lion Who Saw Himself in the Water.

Shah has described how his Latin tutor appeared at the front door "white as a sheet", at having spotted the renowned classicist Robert Graves digging a ditch at the front of Langton House; and how Doris Lessing encouraged him to read folktales and, later, encouraged his enthusiasm for travel.

During his childhood, Shah and his sisters would be taken to Morocco for extended periods, where his grandfather lived until his death in November 1969. Described in his book The Caliph's House, the journeys introduced Shah to "a realm straight out of The Arabian Nights".

== Education ==
Tahir Shah attended Rose Hill Preparatory School in Tunbridge Wells, Kent. At 13, he was sent to Bryanston School, near Blandford Forum, Dorset. He has written about his inability to keep up, as a result of "profound dyslexia".

Aged 17, Shah learnt to fly in Florida, and graduated with an FAA Private Pilot's Licence. He attended university in San Diego, London and Nairobi, where he studied African dictatorships at the United States International University. He graduated with a Bachelor of Arts in International Relations in 1987.

== Writing ==
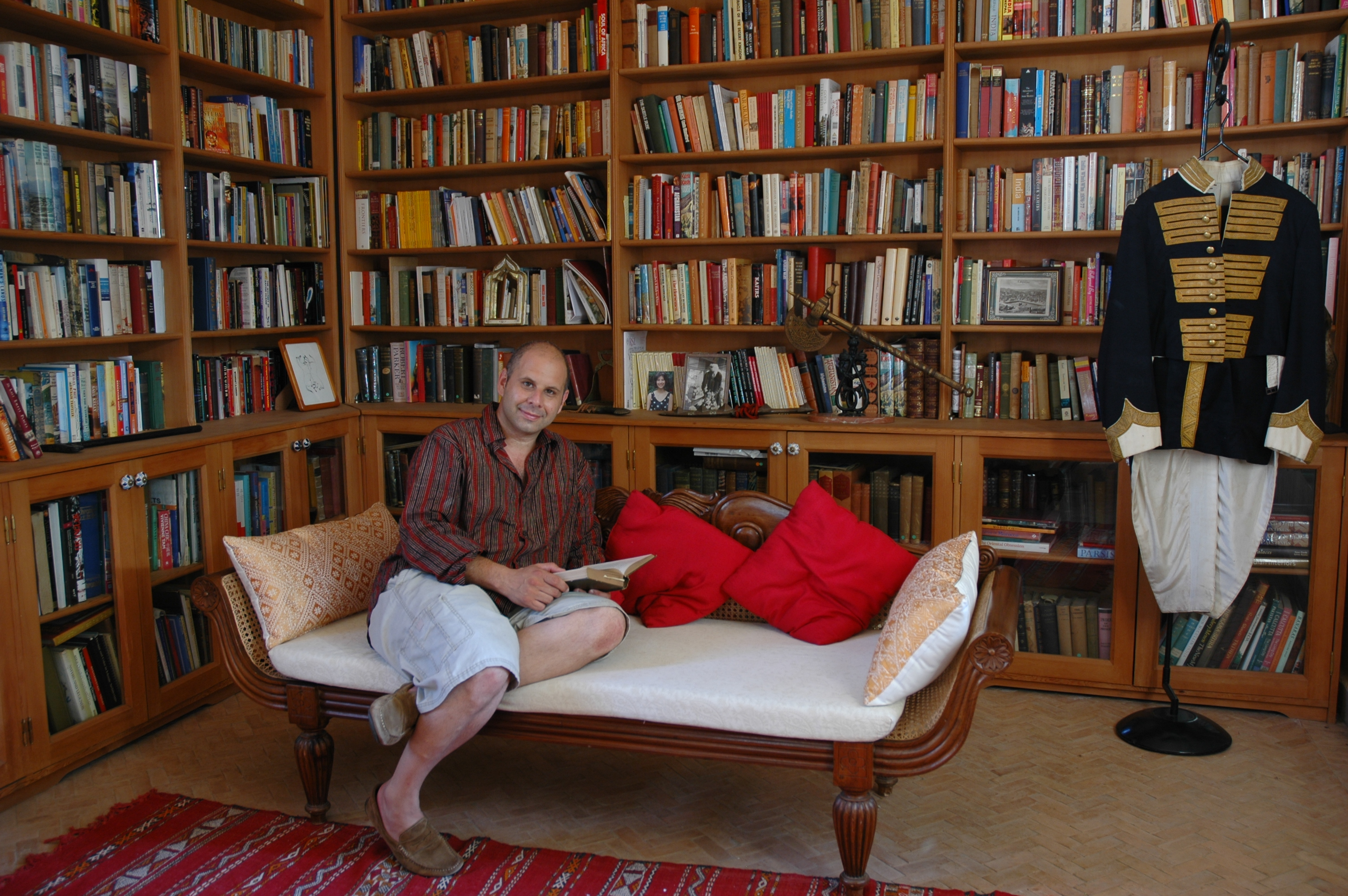
Tahir Shah in his library at the Caliph's House, Casablanca.

Tahir Shah is a prolific author of books, documentaries, book introductions, peer reviewed academic articles, and book reviews. Shah's first published book was Cultural Research, written for the London-based Institute for Cultural Research. One of his more notable works is Trail of Feathers, an account of his trip through Peru, Machu Picchu, the Incas and Cusco. Another book, In Search of King Solomon's Mines, searching for undiscovered mines known only in folklore. Other books like In Arabian Nights and Travels with Myself are mostly about the author's journeys through exotic locations. His first traditional travelogue was in 1995 with Beyond the Devil's Teeth, covering a trip through Africa, India and much of Latin America.

Shah has written book reviews for The Washington Post, The Guardian, The Spectator, and The Literary Review. As well as writing and film making, Shah writes screen material and co-wrote Journey to Mecca, an IMAX film charting the first journey made by Ibn Battuta to Mecca for the Hajj, in 1325. In addition, he reviews for a selection of other media on both sides of the Atlantic, and writes pieces for the radio, such as The Journey, which was read on BBC Radio 3.

In the years before he turned his hand primarily to book writing, Shah wrote a large number of serious reportage-type magazine features, highlighting the lives of the voiceless in society, especially those of women. These included pieces about women on Death Row, widows who cleared mines in Cambodia, the trapped lives of bonded labourers in India, and the women-only police stations in Brazil, known as "Delegacia da Mulher" (Woman's Police Station). He continues to write journalistic pieces, especially aimed at drawing attention to causes he believes deserve public attention.

After publishing several books through traditional publishers, Shah self-published Travels With Myself in 2011 using Lulu.com. He later self-published the limited-edition hardcovers Timbuctoo (2012) and Scorpion Soup (2013).

== Documentaries ==
Shah has presented several documentaries, all of which have followed the quest theme, which have appeared on National Geographic TV, The History Channel, Channel 4, & Channel 5: The Search for King Solomon's Mines, House of the Tiger King, and Search for the Lost Treasure of Afghanistan.

== Influences ==
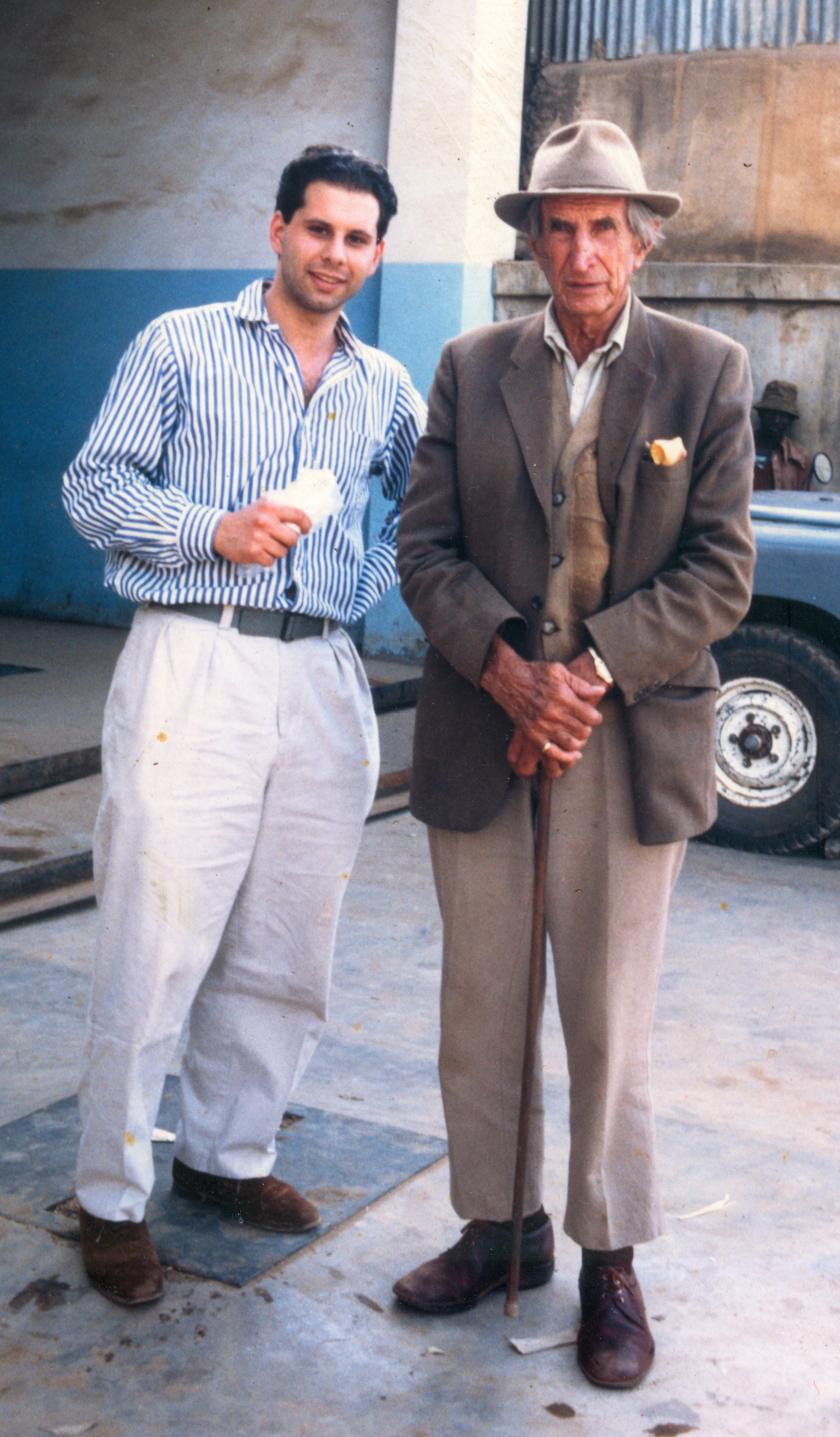
Tahir Shah with Sir Wilfred Thesiger, in Maralal, Kenya.

Shah regards family friend Doris Lessing as a key influence, as well as his aunt Amina Shah. Shah himself has written about his fascination with the works of Bruce Chatwin, especially his book The Songlines, as well as with a range of the classic nineteenth century explorers, such as Samuel White Baker, Heinrich Barth and Sir Richard Burton. He had a close friendship with Wilfred Thesiger, whom he considered a mentor and a source of inspiration.

Shah's father Idries Shah and English poet Robert Graves were close friends and confidants Tahir Shah and his sister were mentioned in correspondence between and Graves and Spike Milligan had a correspondence.

== Literary style ==
Shah's style is one of simple prose and overwhelming humour. He has said that his style of using short blocks of text, with a concluding denouement was influenced by Iron & Silk by Mark Salzman, which he first read in 1988; and that he writes with the intention to educate and inform his readers, while at the same time amusing them. In this capacity, one could liken Shah's work to the literary device employed in several books by his father, Idries Shah, who used the wise fool Mulla Nasrudin to illustrate deeper ideas in human understanding.

Shah avoids "self-congratulatory" literary festivals, although he had appeared as a speaker at a number of them in the past – including at Hay-on-Wye, Wigtown, Shute, Oxford, Deià, Gibraltar, and Vilnius. He writes on a rigid schedule, keeping to a daily target. At any one time he has ‘between 25 and 25 writing projects in development’. Shah's earlier books fell into the travel literature genre, with more recent work being regarded as straight fiction. Most of Shah's work blurs the boundaries between fact and fiction, and Shah himself condemns ‘the way Occidental society draws a rigid line in the sand between one and the other. He champions authors such as Bruce Chatwin and Rory Maclean who have walked a line between the two.

== Political involvement ==
=== Imprisonment in Pakistan ===
In July 2005 (a week after the 7 July London bombings) Shah and two colleagues from Caravan Film in London were arrested in Peshawar in Pakistan's Khyber Pakhtunkhwa and held without charge in solitary confinement in a torture prison. Much of the time they were handcuffed, stripped virtually naked, and blindfolded. After sixteen days of interrogations in a "fully equipped torture room", Shah and his colleagues were released. The Pakistani government agreed that they had done nothing wrong. Tahir Shah gave an interview which was screened on British TV's Channel 4 News, and published an article in the British Sunday Times about the ordeal. Shah has publicly maintained his affection for Pakistan, despite the rough treatment he and his film crew received at the hands of the Pakistani secret services. The illegal custody earned Shah and his film crew a mention in the United States Department of State's 2005 report on Pakistan's human rights practices. The news story came back into the spotlight in July 2008, when a British MP claimed that the British government had 'outsourced' the torture of British citizens to Pakistani security agencies.

=== East-West bridge ===
Tahir Shah is also a champion of what he calls "the East-West Bridge". In the aftermath of the September 11 attacks in the United States in 2001, Tahir Shah began to devote a great deal of time and energy into establishing and promoting a "cultural bridge" made up by those who, like him, are both from the East and from the West. One example of this work is the Qantara Foundation (from "qantara" meaning "bridge" in Arabic). He has spoken and written on the idea that people such as he have a responsibility to "show the East to the West, and the West to the East," highlighting the common cultural heritage of the two, and working towards a common goal. Shah's greatest interest within the east–west theme is probably the subject of the legacy of science in medieval Islam, and its role in creating a foundation for the Renaissance. He has lectured publicly on the subject and believes strongly in the importance of drawing attention to the polymath poet-scientists from the Golden Age of Islam.

== Personal life ==
In 2003 Shah moved to Morocco with his wife Rachana and his children from London. The couple occupy Dar Khalifa, a historic house in the Ain Diab suburb of Casablanca. His 2006 book The Caliph's House is based on his experiences in the property. Shah has written widely about Casablanca, Morocco, and India.

== Works ==
=== Travels ===
- Journey Through Namibia, Camerapix, 1994, ISBN 978-1-874041-23-8
- Spectrum Guide to Jordan, Spectrum Guides, 1994, ISBN 978-0-86190-397-9
- Beyond the Devil's Teeth, Octagon Press, 1995, ISBN 978-1-85799-980-8
- Sorcerer's Apprentice, Weidenfeld & Nicolson, 1998, ISBN 978-0-14-028571-0
- Trail of Feathers, Weidenfeld & Nicolson, 2001, ISBN 978-0-297-64592-4
- In Search of King Solomon's Mines, John Murray, 2002, ISBN 978-0-7195-6324-9
- House of the Tiger King, John Murray, 2004, ISBN 978-0-7195-6611-0
- The Caliph's House, Doubleday, 2006, ISBN 978-0-385-60807-7
- In Arabian Nights, Bantam, 2008, ISBN 9780553805239
- Travels With Myself: Collected Work, Mosaique, 2011, ISBN 978-1-4478-0582-3

=== Novels ===
- Timbuctoo, Secretum Mundi, 2012, ISBN 978-0-9572429-0-6
- Eye Spy, Secretum Mundi, 2013, ISBN 978-1-291-59817-9
- Casablanca Blues, Secretum Mundi, 2013, ISBN 978-1-291-53013-1
- Paris Syndrome, Secretum Mundi, 2014, ISBN 978-1-291-73643-4
- Hannibal Fogg and the Supreme Secret of Man, Secretum Mundi, 2018, ISBN 978-1-912383-21-4
- Jinn Hunter: Book One — The Prism, Secretum Mundi, 2019, ISBN 978-1-912383-28-3
- Godman, Secretum Mundi, 2020, ISBN 978-1-912383-53-5
- Jinn Hunter: Book Two — The Jinnslayer, Secretum Mundi, 2020, ISBN 978-1-912383-60-3
- Midas, Secretum Mundi, 2021, ISBN 978-1-912383-57-3
- Jinn Hunter: Book Three — The Perplexity, Secretum Mundi, 2021, ISBN 978-1-912383-61-0

=== Humour ===
- Travels With Nasrudin, Secretum Mundi, 2019, ISBN 978-1-912383-32-0
- The Misadventures of the Mystifying Nasrudin, Secretum Mundi, 2021, ISBN 978-1-912383-78-8
- The Peregrinations of the Perplexing Nasrudin, Secretum Mundi, 2021, ISBN 978-1-912383-79-5
- The Voyages and Vicissitudes of Nasrudin, Secretum Mundi, 2021, ISBN 978-1-912383-80-1
- Nasrudin in the Land of Fools, Secretum Mundi, 2022, ISBN 978-1-914960-51-2

=== Teaching stories ===
- Scorpion Soup, Secretum Mundi, 2013, ISBN 978-0-9572429-1-3
- The Man who Found Himself, Secretum Mundi, 2021, ISBN 978-1-912383-55-9
- The Arabian Nights Adventures, Secretum Mundi, 2021, ISBN 978-1-912383-62-7
- Caravanserai Stories: Ghoul Brothers, Secretum Mundi, 2021, Limited edition, ISBN 978-1-912383-84-9
- Caravanserai Stories: Hourglass, Secretum Mundi, 2021, Limited edition, ISBN 978-1-912383-85-6
- Caravanserai Stories: Imaginist, Secretum Mundi, 2021, Limited edition, ISBN 978-1-912383-86-3
- Caravanserai Stories: Jinnlore, Secretum Mundi, 2021, Limited edition, ISBN 978-1-912383-87-0
- Caravanserai Stories: Jinn's Treasure, Secretum Mundi, 2021, Limited edition, ISBN 978-1-912383-88-7
- Caravanserai Stories: Mellified Man, Secretum Mundi, 2021, Limited edition, ISBN 978-1-912383-89-4
- Caravanserai Stories: Skeleton Island, Secretum Mundi, 2021, Limited edition, ISBN 978-1-912383-90-0
- Caravanserai Stories: Wellspring, Secretum Mundi, 2021, Limited edition, ISBN 978-1-912383-91-7
- The Caravanserai Stories (combined), Secretum Mundi, 2021, Paperback, ISBN 978-1-912383-93-1
- Daydreams of an Octopus, Secretum Mundi, 2022, ISBN 978-1-914960-01-7
- When the Sun Forgot to Rise, Secretum Mundi, 2022, ISBN 978-1-914960-22-2
- Tales Told to a Melon, Secretum Mundi, 2022, ISBN 978-1-914960-52-9
- Double Six, Secretum Mundi, 2022, ISBN 978-1-914960-98-7
- The Jinn Files, Secretum Mundi, 2022, ISBN 978-1-914960-99-4
- A Treasury of Tales, Secretum Mundi, 2022, ISBN 978-1-914960-88-8
- King of the Jinns, Secretum Mundi, 2022, ISBN 978-1-914960-89-5
- Mouse House, Secretum Mundi, 2022, ISBN 978-1-914960-90-1
- On Backgammon Time, Secretum Mundi, 2022, ISBN 978-1-914960-91-8
- The Cap of Invisibility, Secretum Mundi, 2022, ISBN 978-1-914960-92-5
- The Destiny Ring, Secretum Mundi, 2022, ISBN 978-1-914960-93-2
- The Forgotten Game, Secretum Mundi, 2022, ISBN 978-1-914960-94-9
- The Hoopoe's Flight, Secretum Mundi, 2022, ISBN 978-1-914960-95-6
- The Paradise Tree, Secretum Mundi, 2022, ISBN 978-1-914960-96-3
- The Wondrous Seed, Secretum Mundi, 2022, ISBN 978-1-914960-97-0
- Liquid Time, Secretum Mundi, 2023, ISBN 978-1-915876-33-1
- Cat Dog, Dog Cat, Secretum Mundi, 2023, ISBN 978-1-915876-34-8
- Dream Soup, Secretum Mundi, 2023, ISBN 978-1-915876-19-5
- The Monkey Puzzle Club, Secretum Mundi, 2023, ISBN 978-1-915876-24-9
- The Pharaoh Code, Secretum Mundi, 2023, ISBN 978-1-915876-23-2
- The Problem Exchange, Secretum Mundi, 2023, ISBN 978-1-915876-22-5
- An Unexpected Gift, Secretum Mundi, 2023, ISBN 978-1-915876-21-8
- Princess Pickle's Laugh, Secretum Mundi, 2023, ISBN 978-1-915876-35-5
- QWERTY, Secretum Mundi, 2023, ISBN 978-1-915876-14-0
- Renaissance, Secretum Mundi, 2023, ISBN 978-1-915876-15-7
- The Kingdom of Blink, Secretum Mundi, 2023, ISBN 978-1-915876-17-1
- The Man with the Tiger's Head, Secretum Mundi, 2023, ISBN 978-1-915876-16-4
- The Wisdom of Celestine, Secretum Mundi, 2023, ISBN 978-1-915876-18-8
- The Shop That Sold Truth, Secretum Mundi, 2023, ISBN 978-1-915876-13-3
- The Most Foolish of Men, Secretum Mundi, 2023, ISBN 978-1-915876-12-6
- The Fish's Dream, Secretum Mundi, 2023, ISBN 978-1-915876-10-2
- The Man Whose Arms Grew Branches, Secretum Mundi, 2023, ISBN 978-1-915876-11-9
- The Clockmaker Who Travelled Though Time, Secretum Mundi, 2023, ISBN 978-1-915876-09-6
- The Tale of the Rusty Nail, Secretum Mundi, 2023, ISBN 978-1-915876-07-2
- The Unicorn’s Tear, Secretum Mundi, 2023, ISBN 978-1-915876-08-9
- The Singing Serpents, Secretum Mundi, 2023, ISBN 978-1-915876-06-5
- The Princess of Zilzilam, Secretum Mundi, 2023, ISBN 978-1-915876-05-8
- Capilongo, Secretum Mundi, 2023, ISBN 978-1-915876-04-1
- Mittle-Mittle, Secretum Mundi, 2023, ISBN 978-1-915876-03-4
- Frogland, Secretum Mundi, 2023, ISBN 978-1-915876-02-7
- Cat, Mouse, Secretum Mundi, 2023, ISBN 978-1-915876-01-0
- Changing the World, Secretum Mundi, 2023, ISBN 978-1-915876-00-3

=== Anthologies ===
- The Anthologies: Africa, Secretum Mundi, 2020, ISBN 978-1-912383-36-8
- The Anthologies: Childhood, Secretum Mundi, 2020, ISBN 978-1-912383-38-2
- The Anthologies: Ceremony, Secretum Mundi, 2020, ISBN 978-1-912383-37-5
- The Anthologies: City, Secretum Mundi, 2020, ISBN 978-1-912383-39-9
- The Anthologies: Danger, Secretum Mundi, 2020, ISBN 978-1-912383-40-5
- The Anthologies: East, Secretum Mundi, 2020, ISBN 978-1-912383-41-2
- The Anthologies: Expedition, Secretum Mundi, 2020, ISBN 978-1-912383-42-9
- The Anthologies: Frontier, Secretum Mundi, 2020, ISBN 978-1-912383-43-6
- The Anthologies: Hinterland, Secretum Mundi, 2020, ISBN 978-1-912383-44-3
- The Anthologies: India, Secretum Mundi, 2020, ISBN 978-1-912383-45-0
- The Anthologies: Jungle, Secretum Mundi, 2020, ISBN 978-1-912383-46-7
- The Anthologies: Morocco, Secretum Mundi, 2020, ISBN 978-1-912383-47-4
- The Anthologies: People, Secretum Mundi, 2020, ISBN 978-1-912383-48-1
- The Anthologies: Quest, Secretum Mundi, 2020, ISBN 978-1-912383-49-8
- The Anthologies: South, Secretum Mundi, 2020, ISBN 978-1-912383-50-4
- The Anthologies: Taboo, Secretum Mundi, 2020, ISBN 978-1-912383-35-1
- The Clockmaker's Box, Secretum Mundi, 2020, ISBN 978-1-912383-54-2
- Congress With a Crocodile (editor), Secretum Mundi, 2021, ISBN 978-1-912383-69-6
- A Son of a Son, Volume I (editor), Secretum Mundi, 2021, ISBN 978-1-912383-81-8
- A Son of a Son, Volume II (editor), Secretum Mundi, 2021, ISBN 978-1-912383-82-5
- Tahir Shah Fiction Reader, Secretum Mundi, 2021, ISBN 978-1-912383-77-1
- Tahir Shah Travel Reader, Secretum Mundi, 2021, ISBN 978-1-912383-76-4
- The Anthologies: Jinns, Secretum Mundi, 2022, ISBN 978-1-914960-73-4
- The Anthologies: Magic, Secretum Mundi, 2022, ISBN 978-1-914960-74-1
- The Anthologies: Teaching Stories, Secretum Mundi, 2022, ISBN 978-1-914960-76-5
- The Anthologies: Nasrudin, Secretum Mundi, 2022, ISBN 978-1-914960-75-8

=== Screenplays ===
- Journey to Mecca, c.2008
- Timbuctoo: Screenplay, Secretum Mundi, 2020, ISBN 978-1-912383-58-0
- Casablanca Blues: The Screenplay, Secretum Mundi, 2020, ISBN 978-1-912383-59-7

=== On writing ===
- The Reason to Write, Secretum Mundi, 2020, ISBN 978-1-912383-52-8
- Fiction I Workbook, Secretum Mundi, 2024, ISBN 978-1-915876-52-2
- Travel I Workbook, Secretum Mundi, 2024, ISBN 978-1-915876-61-4
- Historical Fiction I Workbook, Secretum Mundi, 2024, ISBN 978-1-915876-62-1
- Teaching Stories I Workbook, Secretum Mundi, 2024, ISBN 978-1-915876-44-7
- Fantasy I Workbook, Secretum Mundi, 2024, ISBN 978-1-915876-45-4
- Comprehensive I Workbook, Secretum Mundi, 2024, ISBN 978-1-915876-45-4

=== Journalism ===
- Travels With Myself: Collected Work, Mosaique, 2011, ISBN 978-1-4478-0582-3

=== Research ===
- The Middle East Bedside Book, Octagon Press, 1991, ISBN 978-0-86304-060-3
- Cultural Research, (editor) for the London-based Institute for Cultural Research, 1993, ISBN 978-0-86304-064-1
- Three Essays, Secretum Mundi, 2013, ISBN 978-1-291-47127-4

=== As editor ===
- Tale of a Lantern & Other Stories, The Scheherazade Foundation, 2023, ISBN 978-1-915311-03-0
- The Elephant & The Tortoise & Other Stories, The Scheherazade Foundation, 2023, ISBN 978-1-915311-04-7
- The Monkey’s Fiddle & Other Stories, The Scheherazade Foundation, 2023, ISBN 978-1-915311-05-4
- Ghost of the Violet Well & Other Stories, The Scheherazade Foundation, 2023, ISBN 978-1-915311-06-1
- Many Wise Fools & Other Stories, The Scheherazade Foundation, 2023, ISBN 978-1-915311-07-8
- The Frog Prince & Other Stories, The Scheherazade Foundation, 2023, ISBN 978-1-915311-08-5
- The Three Lemons & Other Stories, The Scheherazade Foundation, 2023, ISBN 978-1-915311-09-2
- The Twelve-Headed Griffin & Other Stories, The Scheherazade Foundation, ISBN 978-1-915311-10-8
- The Antelope Boy & Other Stories, The Scheherazade Foundation, 2023, ISBN 978-1-915311-11-5
- The Purple Sapphire & Other Stories, The Scheherazade Foundation, 2023, ISBN 978-1-915311-12-2
- Why the Fish Laughed & Other Stories, The Scheherazade Foundation, 2023, ISBN 978-1-915311-23-8
- Two Cats & Other Stories, The Scheherazade Foundation, 2023, ISBN 978-1-915311-24-5
- Three Stories, The Scheherazade Foundation, 2023, ISBN 978-1-915311-25-2
- The Twilight of the Gods & Other Stories, The Scheherazade Foundation, 2023, ISBN 978-1-915311-26-9
- The Son of Seven Queens & Other Stories, The Scheherazade Foundation, 2023, ISBN 978-1-915311-27-6
- The Moon Maiden & Other Stories, The Scheherazade Foundation, 2023, ISBN 978-1-915311-28-3
- The Metamorphosis & Other Stories, The Scheherazade Foundation, 2023, ISBN 978-1-915311-29-0
- The Celestial Sisters & Other Stories, The Scheherazade Foundation, 2023, ISBN 978-1-915311-30-6
- Tales From The Arabian Nights I, The Scheherazade Foundation, 2023, ISBN 978-1-915311-31-3
- East of the Sun, West of the Moon & Other Stories, The Scheherazade Foundation, 2023, ISBN 978-1-915311-32-0
- Idries Shah Centenary Volume One, Secretum Mundi, 2024, ISBN 978-1-915876-46-1
- Idries Shah Centenary Volume Two, Secretum Mundi, 2024, ISBN 978-1-915876-47-8
- Idries Shah Centenary Volume Three, Secretum Mundi, 2024, ISBN 978-1-915876-48-5
- Idries Shah Centenary Volume Four, Secretum Mundi, 2024, ISBN 978-1-915876-49-2
- Idries Shah Centenary Volume Five, Secretum Mundi, 2024, ISBN 978-1-915876-50-8
- Idries Shah Centenary Volume Six, Secretum Mundi, 2024, ISBN 978-1-915876-58-4
- Idries Shah Centenary Volume Seven, Secretum Mundi, 2024, ISBN 978-1-915876-59-1
- Idries Shah Centenary Volume Eight, Secretum Mundi, 2024, ISBN 978-1-915876-60-7
- Idries Shah Remembered, Idries Shah Media, 2025, ISBN 978-1915876911

=== As a contributor ===
- Revue des Deux Mondes, 2002, ISBN 978-2710324980
- With Remarkable Muslims, Eland Books, 2006, ISBN 978-0907871644
- The Seventy Great Journeys in History, Thames & Hudson, 2006, ISBN 978-0500251294
- Modern Explorers, Thames & Hudson, 2013, ISBN 978-0500296325
- The Lonely Planet Travel Anthology, Lonely Planet, 2016, ISBN 978-1786571960
- Our Morocco, privately published, 2020, ISBN 979-8575846093
- Tales From the Life of Bruce Wannell, Sickle Moon, 2020, ISBN 978-1900209250

=== Introductions ===
- Legends of the Fire Spirits, I. B. Tauris, 2014, ISBN 978-1780769042
- Marrakech: The Red City, Eland Books, 2004, ISBN 978-0907871996
- Home, Quadrille Publishing, 2006, ISBN 978-1844003389
- The Cafe Clock Cookbook, 33-Books, 2010, ISBN 978-0956660008
- Seven League Boots, Tauris Parke, 2012, ISBN 978-0755617579
- The Flying Carpet, Tauris Parke, 2011, ISBN 978-0857720771
- The Glorious Adventure, Tauris Parke, 2012, ISBN 978-1838601843
- A Moroccan Journey, International Publishing House, 2009, ISBN 978-0981469867
- Louis Vuitton: Morocco, Louis Vuitton, 2017, ISBN 9782369831310

== Interviews ==
- Shah, Tahir (1 July 2007). "Travel Writer: Tahir Shah". Vaggablogging (Audio podcast). Interviewed by Rolf Potts.
- Shah, Tahir (4 October 2012). "Wigtown Book Festival 2012: Tahir Shah: 'Publishers have lost the plot'". The Daily Telegraph (Web page). Interviewed by Daisy Bowie-Sell.
- Shah, Tahir (2014). "Tahir". Jazmine Russell (Web page). Interviewed by Jazmine Russell.
- Shah, Tahir (12 December 2014). "Playing Godman". Snap Judgement (Audio podcast). Interviewed by Glynn Washington.
- Shah, Tahir (3 March 2019). "In Conversation with Tahir Shah". Robert Twigger (Audio podcast). Interviewed by Robert Twigger.
- Shah, Tahir (13 December 2020). "Widemindedness: Tahir Shah". Widemindedness (Web page). Interviewed by Victoria Ball.
- Ambreen, Nida (2021). "In Conversation with Tahir Shah". English Studies in Southern Africa (Print). 26 (2–3): 67–70. doi:10.1080/18125441.2022.2124442. S2CID 253217042.
- Shah, Tahir (29 April 2021). "Online Talk – Tahir Shah". World Storytelling Cafe (Web page with video). Interviewed by Staff.
- Shah, Tahir (6 July 2021). "Bridging Cultures Through Story". Story Dojo (Video). Interviewed by Mary Alice MacArthur.
- Shah, Tahir (20 September 2021). "Meet EBC: Interview With Tahir shah The Scheherazade Foundation". Ethiopian Broadcasting Corporation (Video). Interviewed by Tefera Ghedamu.
- Shah, Tahir (8 December 2021). "Susitikimas su rašytoju Tahiru Shahu ir knygos 'Mago mokinys' pristatymas". Tyto alba (Lithuanian) (Video).
- Shah, Tahir (28 January 2022). "TNN January Book Club 'The Caliph's House: A Year in Casablanca' with author Tahir Shah". The Nomadic Network (Video). Interviewed by Staff.
- Shah, Tahir (13 June 2022). "Interview with author Tahir Shah". Cassandra Goad (Web page). Interviewed by Cassandra Goad.
- Shah, Tahir (13 July 2022). "Tahir Shah - The Intrepid Writer's Journey". Follow Your Blisters (Audio podcast). Interviewed by Will Gethin.
- "Finding the Caliph's House | Tahir Shah". Via YouTube (Video). Afrika. 3 May 2023.

== Articles ==
- Webster, Jason (24 February 2023). "In search of the white house of Casablanca". Financial Times.

== Radio and TV ==
- Bedi, Nikki (Presenter) (2006). Tahir Shah, Casablanca (Video) (Television broadcast). Casablanca: Desi DNA.
- Tahir Shah (30 April 2011). The Mosque at the End of the World (Audio) (Radio broadcast). Marrakech: BBC Radio 3. Archived from the original on 27 March 2019.

== See also ==
- The Scheherazade Foundation
