= The Caliph's House =

- US edition cover
- Author: Tahir Shah
- Illustrator: Tahir Shah (photos)
- Language: English
- Subject: Morocco, folklore
- Genre: Travel
- Publisher: Bantam Dell
- Publication date: October 26, 2006
- Publication place: United States
- ISBN: 978-0553383102
- Preceded by: House of the Tiger King
- Followed by: In Arabian Nights

The Caliph's House is a travel book by Anglo-Afghan author, Tahir Shah.

== Overview ==
Unwilling to raise his two infant children in England, Tahir Shah drags them and his Indian-born wife to Morocco, where he traveled as a child. It was there that his grandfather, the savant Sirdar Ikbal Ali Shah, passed the last decade of his life (he moved to Tangier after his wife died in 1960, declaring that he would go to a land where he had never been together). Shah's father was equally obsessed with Morocco, largely it seems because it reminded him of his native Afghanistan, in terms of the culture, climate and geography.

Arriving in 2004, Shah and his family move into a Jinn-filled mansion in the middle of a Casablanca shantytown. The house, named Dar Khalifa, (which translated as 'The Caliph's House), describes in detail the highs and lows of the relocation to what was essentially an unfamiliar country. The house came equipped with three hereditary guardians, who control every facet of life, straining to remind the Shahs of the danger of the Jinn. Eventually a grand exorcism was acted out, with the slaughter of animals and so forth, to the delight of the guardians.

== Translations ==
The Caliph's House was published in 2006 on both sides of the Atlantic, and has been followed by a series of translations in a number of languages, including Spanish, French, German, Italian, Swedish and Dutch. The wide appeal of this book seems to be the way in which it imparts (albeit in a humorous way) a deeper understanding of Arab culture—which is of interest in the post-9/11 world. The sequel, In Arabian Nights, picks up where this book leaves off.

== Awards ==
The Caliph's House was nominated as one of TIME magazine's 10 Best Books of 2006 It was also selected to be read on BBC Radio 4's Book of the Week. The book is to be the basis for a feature film, written and directed by identical twin Hollywood writers Chad and Carey Hayes.
