= Walter Quin =

Irish poet (1575?–1640)

Walter Quin (1575?–1640) was an Irish poet who worked in Scotland and England for the House of Stuart.

== Ireland ==
Born about 1575 in Dublin, nothing is known of Quin's early life before he travelled to study law at the Jesuit University of Ingolstadt in Germany around 1590. Although Quin referred to his Dublin origins in his work, his Irish family cannot be identified. The Stuarts rewarded him with property in Ireland, but there is no direct evidence that he returned to his native country. Quin wrote in English, Latin, French, and Italian, a polyglot combination that was a hallmark of his output. He is one of the earliest modern Irish writers to have had original work printed in English and of this small group he is notable for producing several (albeit slim) volumes that included works of court poetry, history, biography and philosophy.

== Scotland ==
Having, for unknown reasons moved to the Calvinist University of St Andrews in Scotland, in 1595 Quin was presented to James VI, who was charmed with his manner and his verse. He further recommended himself to the king's favour by giving him some poetic Anagrams of his own composition that were based on James's name in four languages. The good impression which Quin made was confirmed by his presenting the king, on New Year's Day 1596, with an oration about his title to the English throne, a subject that was increasingly controversial as Elizabeth I grew older and yet had no official heir.

Quin's verses presented James as a second King Arthur, and were critical of the role of the Cecils in English policy making. The political implications of his poetry led to Quin's appearances at court being tracked by the English agents of Sir Robert Cecil who was sent a copy of Quin's Anagrams in 1600. Because of this controversy, the Edinburgh printer, Robert Waldegrave, refused, to print a book on the subject which Quin prepared in February 1598. He was at the time reported to be "answering Spenser's book, whereat the king is offended".

Meanwhile, Quin had been taken into the service of James VI as tutor to his sons, and he gave proof of his loyalty by publishing, in 1600, Sertum Poeticum in honorem Jacobi Sexti. The volume consists of some of Quin's early anagrams on the king's name, with Latin odes and epigrams, and English sonnets, addressed to members of the royal family and the rescuers of James VI during the Gowrie Conspiracy. An extravagant sonnet on Sir William Alexander (afterwards Earl of Stirling) appeared in the first edition of the latter's Tragedie of Darius (1603). In 1604 Quin celebrated the marriage of Sir William with an epithalamium and two sonnets.

== England ==
Quin migrated with king James to England in 1603 where he was employed as a music teacher in the household of Henry Frederick, Prince of Wales. As part of the prince's circle Quin contributed Italian verses "In lode del autore" to Thomas Coryat's Odcombian Banquet (1611). In common with many other poets of the time, he lamented his young patron's death; these elegies were printed in Joshua Sylvester's Lachrymæ Lachrymarum (1612).

Quin subsequently became a tutor to Prince Charles. For Charles's use he compiled Corona Virtutum principe dignarum ex varijs Philosophorum, Historicorum, Oratorum, et Poetarum (1603), a neo-Stoic florilegium on virtue culled from the work of Justus Lipsius with accounts of the lives and virtues of Antoninus Pius and Marcus Aurelius. In The Memorie of the most worthy and renowned Bernard Stuart, Lord D'Aubigni, renewed (1619), Quin produced a biography of Bernard Stewart, 4th Lord of Aubigny, a Franco-Scottish hero who he believed was unduly neglected despite his importance to military affairs in France, Italy, and England (where he had fought for Henry Tudor at the Battle of Bosworth). In the preface, Quin states that he had collected materials in French for a prose life of his hero but they proved inadequate for his purpose so A Short Collection of the most Notable Places of Histories is appended, together with a series of poems addressed to Prince Charles.

On Charles I's marriage to Henrietta Maria in 1625 Quin published In Nuptiis Principum incomparabilium, congratulatory verses in Latin, English, French, and Italian. Appropriately, French poetry was to the fore for a French bride and Quin rejoiced in the union of the rose of England with the lily of France. Around this time he returned to historical biography with a French prose account of the memorable sayings of Henri IV, the new queen's father. This was Quin's last extended work. Ten Latin lines signed "Walt. O—Quin Armig." are prefixed to Sir Thomas Herbert's Travels (1634). Quin died in London in 1640.

== Family ==
Another son of Quin's, James (1621–1659), born in Middlesex, obtained a scholarship at Westminster, and was elected to Christ Church, Oxford, in 1639. He graduated B.A. in 1642, and M.A. in 1646, and was elected a senior student. As an avowed royalist he was ejected from this position by the parliamentary visitors in 1648. Anthony à Wood, who was acquainted with him, often heard him "sing with great admiration." His voice was a bass, "the best in England, and he had great command of it … but he wanted skill, and could scarce sing in consort." He contrived to obtain an introduction to Cromwell, who was so delighted with his musical talent that, "after liquoring him with sack," he restored him to his place at Christ Church. But in 1651 he was reported to be insane and he died in October 1659 and was buried in the cathedral of Christ Church. James Quin contributed to the Oxford University collections of Latin verse issued on the return of the king from Scotland in 1641, and on the peace with the Dutch Republic in 1654.

== See also ==
- List of polyglots
