= Hugh Holland =

Welsh writer

Hugh Holland (1563–1633) was a Welsh writer.

== Biography ==
Holland was born in Denbigh in Denbighshire, north of Wales. The son of Robert Holland. He was educated at Westminster School under William Camden, where he excelled in classics and met playwright and poet Ben Jonson, with whom he established an "enduring friendship". In 1589, he proceeded to Trinity College, Cambridge on a scholarship. On completion of his studies, he travelled abroad, as far as Rome, where unguarded remarks about Queen Elizabeth caused him some trouble, and Jerusalem, where he may have been made a Knight of the Holy Sepulchre. On his return journey he received a reprimand from the English ambassador in Constantinople for the 'former freedom of his tongue'.

On settling back in England, he took up residence in Oxford, where he pursued his reading, and then in London. He failed to secure preferment, but enjoyed the patronage of the Duke of Buckingham, George Villiers who introduced him to King James. He wrote poetry, most notably a collection entitled Cypress Garland (1625), and was buried in Westminster Abbey on 28 July 1633. His memory as a man of letters is associated with the laudatory sonnet he wrote on Shakespeare, which was printed in the First Folio (1623).

He was married to Ursula, widow of Robert Woodard of Burnham, Buckinghamshire, with whom he had three children: a daughter named Phil and two sons, Martin and Arbellinus.

Anthony à Wood recorded a copy of his epitaph, in which Holland described himself as Miserimus peccator, musarum et amicitiarum cultor sanctissimus. (A possible translation of which might yield The most miserable sinner, the most sacred worshipper of muses and of friendships).

== Works ==
- Pancharis: the first Booke. Containing the Preparation of the Love between Owen Tudyr and the Queene, long since intended to her Maiden Majestie and now dedicated to the Invincible James, (1603).
- A Cypres Garland. For the Sacred Forehead of our late Soveraigne King James, (1625).
- Commendatory verses appended to Giles Farnaby's Canzonets, (1598)
- Commendatory verses to Ben Jonson's Sejanus (play), (1605)
- Commendatory verses to Edmund Bolton's Elements of Armory, (1610)
- Commendatory verses to Thomas Coryate's The Odcombian Banquet, (1611)
