= Do Not Pass Go =

Book by Tim Moore about the London of the game Monopoly

Front cover of the 2003 edition, showing an illustration by Jason Ford

Do Not Pass Go: From the Old Kent Road to Mayfair is Tim Moore's examination of the London of the British version of the board game Monopoly.

A review in the Belfast Sunday Life described it:

[It] tells the story of London since the 1930s, through the 28 streets, stations and utilities of the Monopoly board. Do Not Pass Go is a travelogue, and an epic and lovingly researched history of London's "progress" in the years since the launch of [Monopoly].

Moore's fourth book, Do Not Pass Go was first published in 2002.

== Background ==
Moore, "a life-long Monopoly fan, ... decided to travel around London using [Monopoly's] board as his guide".

The original game marketed as "Monopoly" was American and staged in Atlantic City; but when the Leeds printing company John Waddington had acquired the rights to market an adapted version in Britain, the stage was changed to London.

During some unidentified weekend in 1935, Victor Watson, the managing director of John Waddington, and his secretary Marjorie Phillips arrived from Leeds to look around London. Moore imagined that the company's archives, held by the West Yorkshire Archive Service in Sheepscar, might contain letters explaining why certain placenames were or were not included (perhaps "Tottenham Court Road was excluded after a bellboy at Heal's laughed at his spats"). But they did not. (Moore later surmised that most of the choices were made more casually.)

The "year zero" of London-based Monopoly – the year of its first publication – was 1936, when "London stood on the threshold of the consumerist age, yet had somehow got its pelvis wedged in the Victorian porch out front".

Moore makes considerable use of his copy of the 1933 edition of the Post Office London Street Directory, which "helpfully supplied an exhaustive list of the residents and proprietors of every address in the immediate pre-Monopoly era".

But Do Not Pass Go may owe more to the mission and baleful achievements of Harold Clunn ("a man whose fanatical devotion to motorised transport marks him out as the Mr Toad of 1930s civic planning"), particularly Clunn's book The Face of London (1934). Moore points out that although Clunn (an antisemite) would be "easy to dismiss ... as a ludicrous fascist ... the uncomfortable truth is that in the mid-thirties he was by no means a lone voice in the wilderness":

Anything that interfered with the private car's progress across the Monopoly zone was simply wiped off the board: after horses and trams, trolleybuses disappeared in 1961. It is impossible to overstress this fixation with the free movement of motor traffic, one that taken to monstrous extremes would, eventually and inevitably, scoop the soul out of large swathes around the cheap end of the Monopoly board.

Reviewing Do Not Pass Go and Edward Platt's Leadville, Paul Collins wrote in The Believer that the 1930s

was a machine age of reinforced concrete, metal, and glass, and with it an approaching tidal wave of car traffic: For the city to survive, [Le Corbusier and Clunn] argued, the old sentimental forms and building materials needed to be thrown out.

== Content ==
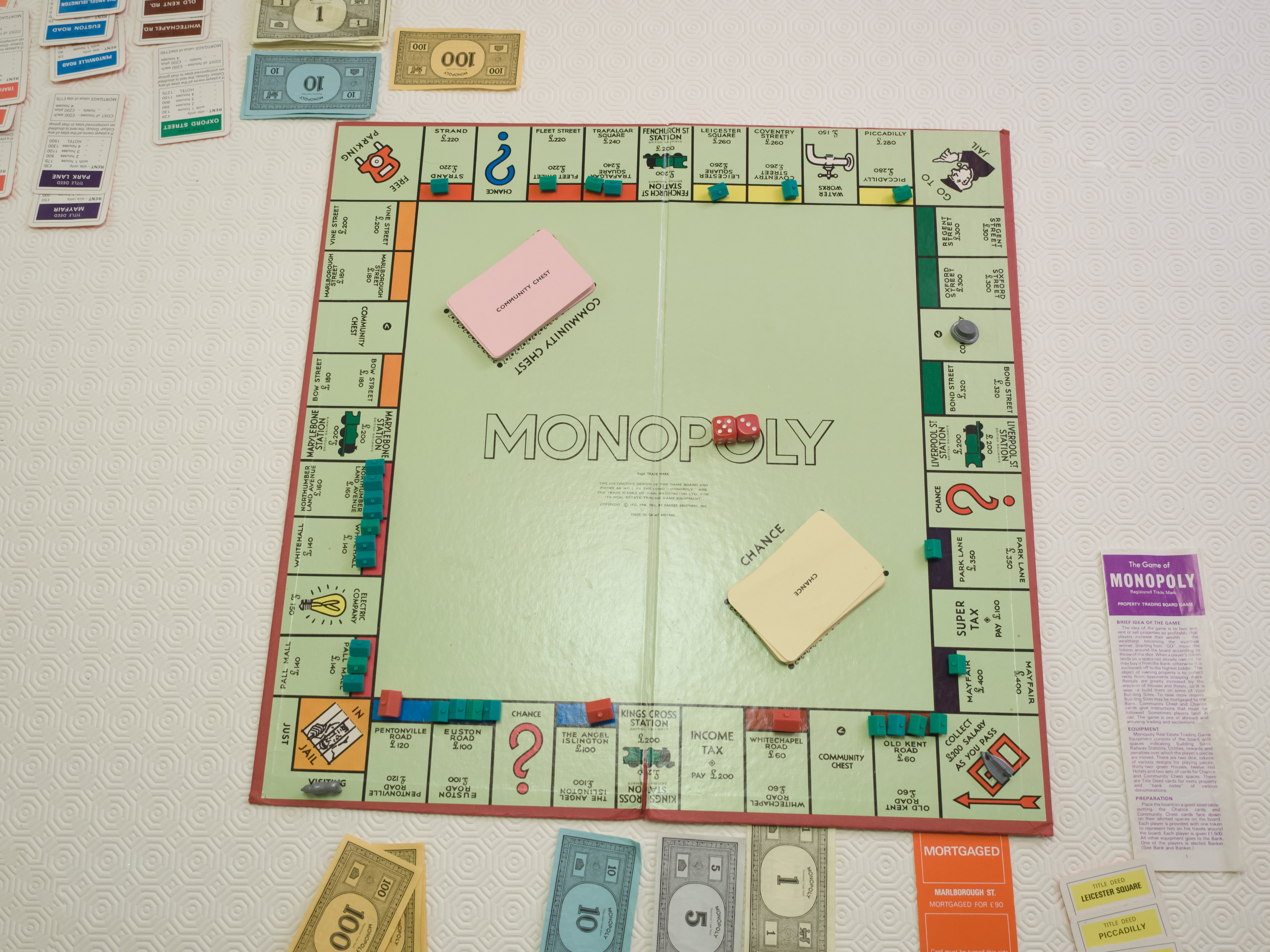
British version (of unknown date), based on London, of Monopoly. King's Cross Station is at bottom centre; the Angel, Islington, bottom left; the oranges, left top

Aside from Park Lane, Trafalgar Square, and the Old Kent Road, Moore did not, at the outset, know how any of the Monopoly addresses had acquired its name. A description of a place tends to start with its acquisition of the name used in Monopoly, and continue with a description of it both as Watson and Phillips would have seen it in 1935 and as Moore himself saw it, circa 2001.

=== Kings Cross Station ===
Moore started at King's Cross, site of the station where Watson and Phillips would have arrived,

The name King's Cross "hadn't struck me as especially outlandish, so I was reasonably astounded to learn that the landmark which gave the area its name had survived for less than a decade." Moore thus introduces the short history of that landmark. By the 1930s the area was very much a transport hub; now in the 21st century it was "nationally synonymous with kerb-crawling, football violence and brazenly conducted class A drug deals".

Moore thought that "If you were going to sail that close to the wind, you might at least hope it blew you off on some voyage of discovery". Thinking that alcoholics and crack dealers would be unlikely to enlighten him about King's Cross: "I had merely to locate a suitably approachable [sex worker] and engage her in streetwise banter; the inside story of King's Cross would be laid out before me by someone who'd seen it all, who'd been there, done that and wet the T-shirt."

=== The Angel, Islington ===
"In the early seventeenth century an inn with the spread-winged Angel of the Annunciation as its sign was the first staging post out of London on the Great North Road"; and Moore provides a brief history down to 1922, when it was bought for use as a Lyons Corner House. There follows a social history of these Corner Houses (which "dominated thirties London in a far more ubiquitous and all-pervading sense than McDonald's or Starbucks have managed or ever will"), as well as a history of the Wimpy Bars that replaced some of them.

The Angel Corner House was long gone by the time Do Not Pass Go was written; the building now housed the Co-operative Bank.

I walked back north along Upper Street's raised pavements past a staggering succession of coffee shops and cute eateries.... This part of Islington, gentrified so ruthlessly in the last twenty years, seems ill at ease in the light blues: in the real world, each of those little fifty-quid houses you line up on The Angel would, according to local estate agents, have set you back £600,000....

Moore interviews a councillor, Pat Haynes, who describes the economic and demographic changes through the twentieth century, and about social change. He avoids romanticizing the earlier Islington (in Moore's words, "even after the [second world war] three-quarters of Islington households had no running water"), points out that the recent wave of gentrification was not Islington's first, and downplays the radicalism for which Islington has been caricatured.

=== Vine Street ===
Each of eight among the seventeen chapters is simply titled by, and devoted to, a single colour on the board: 4, "The Purples"; 6, "The Yellows"; 8, "The Oranges"; 12, "The Reds"; 13, "The Light Blues"; 15, "The Greens"; 16, "The Dark Blues"; 17, "The Browns". Moore describes the yellows (Leicester Square, Coventry Street, Piccadilly) as "the good-time set, the night-on-the-tiles set, the party-till-you-drop set". As for the greens (Oxford, Regent, and Bond streets), "Each ... bills itself as offering the ultimate London shopping experience, a contest that extends to rival Christmas light displays." Four other colours were for neighbours – for the Reds, this was particularly simple ("walk up the Strand from Trafalgar Square and just after you pass the Law Courts you'll notice the road has become Fleet Street".) Anomalously, the two Browns were not mutual neighbours, but were linked by their proletarian character.

That left "The Oranges": Bow, Marlborough, and Vine streets.

In central London there was no "Marlborough Street", aside from "an inconsequential alley in South Kensington". (Note: Marlborough Street, London SW3, is at 51.491°N 0.1709°W.) And although Bow Street was still known for the Runners, Vine Street remained mysterious. "Three are listed in the central area, (Note: The Vine Street of London EC3 is at 51.513°N 0.077°W; that of London W1 at 51.510°N 0.140°W. As for a claimed third, this is perhaps the result of a confusion with Vine Hill (EC1, 51.522°N 0.113°W), Vine Street Bridge (EC1, 51.523°N 0.107°W), or Vine Yard (SE1, 51.501°N 0.095°W).) all of a dimensional stature one might justifiably dismiss as poxy." Whichever Vine Street is chosen, Bow, Marlborough, and Vine streets are not close to each other.

Moore eventually realizes that "Marlborough Street" was simply shorthand for Great Marlborough Street, and thus that "what linked the oranges was The Law. The Bow Street Runners. Marlborough Street Magistrates Court. Vine Street Police Station."

== Reception ==
The review in the Yorkshire Evening Post described the book:

Written in an anecdotal style and peppered with fascinating facts, it's like Bill Bryson meets Simon Schama meets Dave Gorman. Alongside the fruity history and the thrill of the quest Moore invests the book with a warming humanity and humour....

That in the Dublin Sunday Tribune commented that "you know that any journey which begins with the traveller playing Monopoly with a transsexual Brazilian prostitute in King's Cross is never going to be boring."

"Anyone who's ploughed through Peter Ackroyd's worthy but tedious London: The Biography might recoil at the mere prospect of this book", wrote Marcus Berkmann in the Daily Mail. However, he continued:

[Moore] is a very funny writer, oozing with comic ideas, and a tireless truffler of strange-but-true facts about the places he visits.... Moore tries particularly hard to enter the heads of the Waddingtons executive and his secretary who came down to London from Leeds on a day trip in 1935 to decide which streets they would use for the game.... [W]hen he is describing some of the "scrapes" he gets into, ... tidal waves of verbiage are the result.... But there are fantastic jokes here, some lovely observation and a wealth of delicious information.

Melanie McGrath wrote in the Evening Standard that the book

is a charming and informative romp through bits of London both familiar (Leicester Square) and obscure (Vine Street).... [E]ven the most inauspicious corners of the Monopolis, such as Northumberland Avenue, turn out to be wonderful spinning hubs of history. And Moore gives us some engaging insights into the changes the capital has undergone since 1936.... In the past, he's been hailed as the "new" Bill Bryson and occasionally compared to Pete McCarthy. Truth to tell, Moore is a more interesting and scrupulous observer than Bryson and funnier by miles than McCarthy.... Do Not Pass Go is a kind of Grand Tour, Reggie Perrin-style and its author is an original, simultaneously the boy next door and the loony in the suburban potting shed.

However, "[Moore's] prose style suffers from the occasional anecdote choke", and "there's some nostalgic overkill for a period Moore is too young to have witnessed."

The review in the Daily Telegraph was tempered in its appreciation: although the Monopoly game at King's Cross "is not just a funny set piece, but leads to thoughtful reflections on the tradition of 'tolerant individualism' that has attracted outcasts", this was a high point of a book with "much traipsing back and forth along the likes of Fleet Street and Northumberland Avenue": although such material is spiced with fascinating details, "after a while we begin to feel as though we're on a busy high street at five o'clock on a Saturday after a day's shopping: we've had enough". The review concluded that "there are too many buildings, too much pavement, and not enough of Moore himself, hilariously encountering jellied-eel sellers or living it large at Claridge's."

A Guardian review of the book by Emma Hagestadt described it as "a witty and ingeniously contrived grand tour that manages to distil arcane board-game trivia (why Vine Street?), sociohistorical nuggets ... and the mandatory supply of travel-writerly scrapes". She suggested that its content should have been trimmed, but wrote that "[Moore's] memories of childhood gamesmanship – the head-melting arithmetic involved in calculating street repairs, the pleasure of stacking up your paper lolly – are worth the cover price alone." A later review by Simon Beckett in the same newspaper described the book as "[p]acked with historical trivia that's both informative and completely useless.... It's hilarious stuff"; although he warns that it contains "rather more than you'd care to know about sewage".

"Get London Reading" – managed by BookTrust, sponsored by the Arts Council, and promoted by the mayor, Ken Livingstone – was a project urging Londoners to read about London. It particularly recommended twelve books by living authors, one of them being Do Not Pass Go. (Note: The other eleven were: Some Kind of Black (Diran Adebayo), Dangerous Lady (Martina Cole), High Fidelity (Nick Hornby), My East End (Gilda O'Neill), Mortal Engines (Philip Reeve), London (Edward Rutherfurd), London Orbital (Iain Sinclair), White Teeth (Zadie Smith), Samuel Pepys: The Unequalled Self (Claire Tomalin), Fingersmith (Sarah Waters), Diaspora City: The London New Writing Anthology (ed. Nick McDowell).)

== Television ==
Do Not Pass Go was also made into an ITV1 regional television programme, introduced by its author. A reviewer noted its "surely-valuable-in-a-pub-quiz factoids" and said that:

the programme is laced with tremendous amounts of sarcasm. Arriving at the final Monopoly address, Moore reminds us that the name Mayfair is eschewed by the local authority, so doesn't exist "except as a cheap packet of fags and a defunct pornographic monthly".

== Editions ==
Do Not Pass Go: From the Old Kent Road to Mayfair:

- London: Yellow Jersey, 2002. ISBN 0-224-06263-8
- London: Vintage, 2003. ISBN 0-09-943386-9
