= Coryat's Crudities =

1611 European travelogue

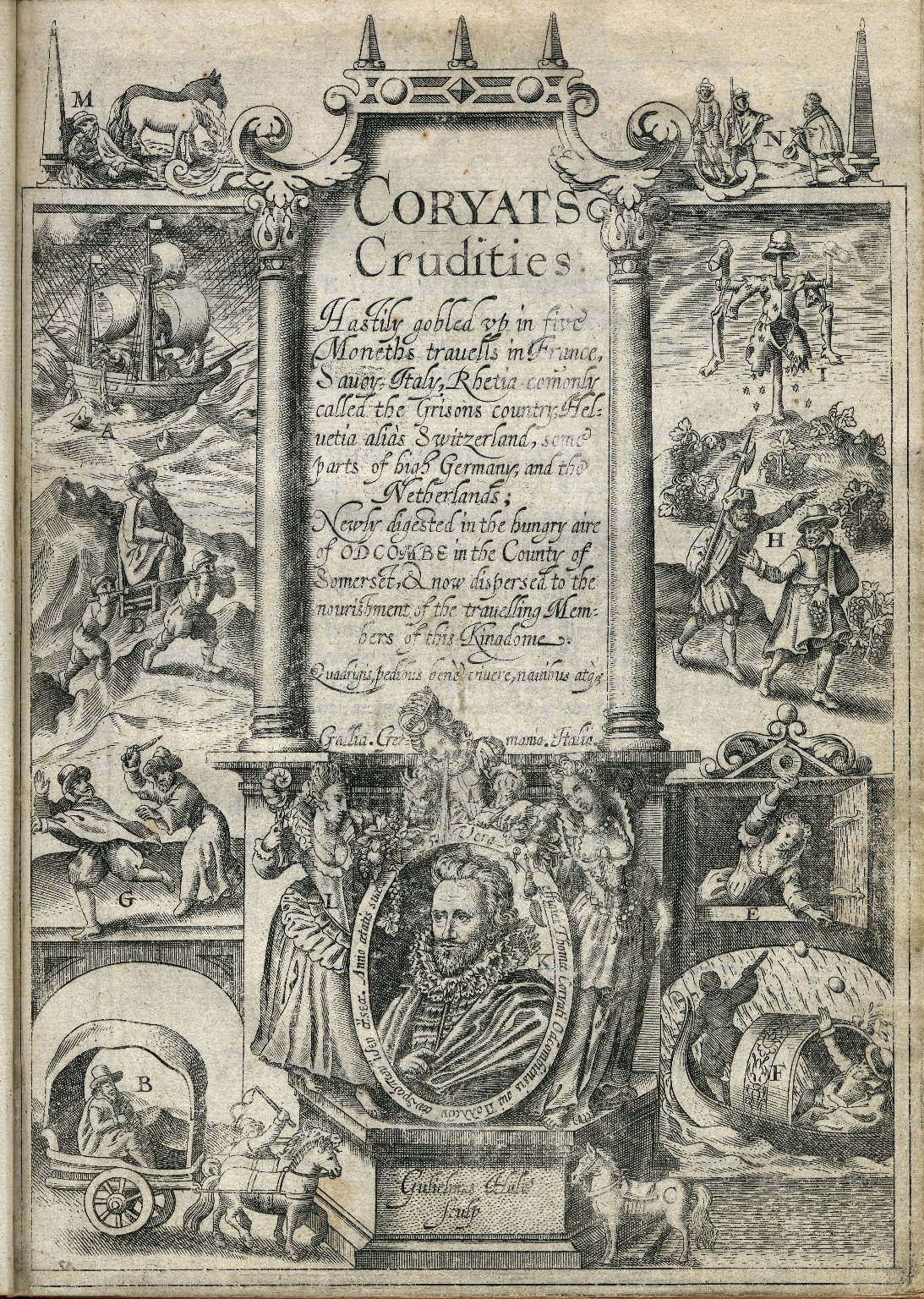
The title page of Coryat's Crudities, printed in 1611.

Coryat's Crudities: Hastily gobled up in Five Moneth's Travels is a travelogue published in 1611 by Thomas Coryat (sometimes also spelled "Coryate" or "Coriat") of Odcombe, an English traveller and mild eccentric.

== History ==
The book is an account of a journey undertaken, much of it on foot, in 1608 through France, Italy, Germany, and other European countries. Coryat conceived of the 1,975-mile (3,175 km) voyage to Venice and back in order to write the subsequent travelogue dedicated to Henry, Prince of Wales, at whose court he was regarded as somewhat of a buffoon and jester, rather than the wit and intellectual he considered himself. The extent to which Coryat invited such ridicule in pursuit of patronage and court favour is unclear.

The year 1608, when Coryat made his journey, was a period of relative peace in France following the end of both the French Wars of Religion (1562–1598), and the Franco-Spanish War (1595–1598) in northern France. Coryat's anecdotes of how the Spanish took Calais in 1596, and Amiens with a bag of walnuts in 1597, were recent events in 1608.

Among other things, Coryat's book introduced the use of the fork to England and, in its support of continental travel, helped to popularize the idea of the Grand Tour that rose in popularity later in the century. The book also included what is likely the earliest English rendering of the legend of William Tell.

The work is particularly important to music historians for giving extraordinary details of the activities of the Venetian School, one of the most famous and progressive contemporary musical movements in Europe. The work includes an elaborate description of the festivities at the church of San Rocco in Venice, with polychoral and instrumental music by Giovanni Gabrieli, Bartolomeo Barbarino, and others.

The book appeared with engravings by William Hole, and the author received a pension.

Crudities was only twice reprinted at the time, so the first edition is quite rare today. Later, "modern" facsimiles were put out, in 1776 and 1905, which included the later trip to Persia & India.

== "Commendatory" verses ==
A custom of Renaissance humanists was to contribute commendatory verses that would preface the works of their friends. In the case of this book, a playful inversion of this habit led to a poetic collection that firstly refused to take the author seriously; and then took on a life of its own. Prince Henry as Coryat's patron controlled the situation; and willy-nilly Coryat had to accept the publication with his book of some crudely or ingeniously false panegyrics from 55 contemporary wits and poets of his acquaintance, including John Donne, Ben Jonson, Inigo Jones, and Thomas Roe. Further, the book was loaded with another work, Henry Peacham's Sights and Exhibitions of England, complete with a description of a perpetual motion machine by Cornelis Drebbel.

There were poems in seven languages. Donne wrote in an English/French/Italian/Latin/Spanish macaronic language. Peacham's was in what he called "Utopian", which was partly gibberish, and the pseudonymous Glareanus Vadianus (tentatively John Sanford) wrote something close to literary nonsense. The contribution of John Hoskyns is called by Noel Malcolm "the first specimen of full-blown literary English nonsense poetry in the seventeenth century".

In the same year that the book was published, a pirate version of the verses appeared, published by Thomas Thorpe, under the title The Odcombian Banquet (1611).

== Modern analogues ==
British travel writer and humourist Tim Moore retraced the steps of Coryat's tour of Europe, as recounted in his 2001 book Continental Drifter.
