= Continental Drifter =

Humorous travel book by Tim Moore

Front cover of the first British edition

Continental Drifter: Taking the Low Road with the First Grand Tourist, published in Britain in 2001, is Tim Moore's second book. (In the US, it is titled The Grand Tour: The European Adventure of a Continental Drifter.)

Having learnt from Edward Chaney that the inventor of the Grand Tour was Thomas Coryate, and having digested Coryats Crudities, Moore found Coryate "a fascinating character [... who] had such a sad life", and decided to retrace the route he had taken in 1608; but, rather than walking, he "dressed in a purple velvet suit and [drove] a stately, but ancient, Rolls Royce".

Manfred Pfister describes the book:

[F]or Thomas Coryate, the contemporary of Shakespeare, and for Tim Moore, following in his traces, Venice was Italy's nec plus ultra bordering upon the Orient or Asia [...]. Moore's journey, narrated in [Continental Drifter], is [...] the modern re-enactment of a famous first journey, and it is performed in a similar carnival mood. The contrast in the title between the "Grand Tourist" and the "Low Road" makes that sufficiently clear, and the hilarious contrast between the famous "Odcombian leg-stretcher", (Note: This was Coryate's term for himself; he lived in Odcombe, Somerset.) walking it across Northern Italy and the rest of Europe, and Tim Moore in his eccentric, decrepit Rolls Royce, which gets him into one silly scrape after another, engages the traveller's and the reader's interest more than the following and crossing of Coryate's and later Grand Tourists' traces, whose impressions are dutifully quoted every now and then and, more often than not, hilariously contradicted. [...] [I]t was [Edward Chaney] who drew [Moore's] attention to Coryate in the first place and thus set a relationship going that develops from the author considering Coryate as nothing but a "grand bore" to an awareness that he may not have won "all [...] running battles with Coryate".

Pfistner writes that Continental Drifter – with Fiona Pitt-Kethley's Journeys to the Underworld and William Dalrymple's In Xanadu: A Quest – exemplifies:

a specifically postmodern version of engaging with the resources of cultural memory in travel writing which I would like to call, in Bakhtinian terms, the Carnivalisation of Traces. [...] Travelling in pursuit of traces [...] often invokes the time-honoured myth of a quest, a quest for some sacred site, object or experience as in the Arthurian romances of the Middle Ages. Postmodern travelling in pursuit of traces, however, where it evokes this narrative archetype, tends to subvert and exploit its cultural pretensions and sacred aura to comic effect.

In The Observer, Stephanie Merritt wrote of Continental Drifter that a difficulty of self-deprecating travel writing is "the obligation to keep the humour at full throttle throughout, so that at times the book labours under a weight of irrelevant reminiscences about [Moore's] schooldays or family"; yet "Continental Drifter is vivid, if a little caustic, in its observations of Europe and has a stamp of authenticity, which Moore attributes to 'a stunted imagination'."

== Editions ==
Continental Drifter: Taking the Low Road with the First Grand Tourist:

- London: Abacus, 2001. ISBN 0-349-11464-1
- London: Abacus, 2002. ISBN 0-349-11419-6

The Grand Tour: The European Adventure of a Continental Drifter:

- New York: St Martin's, 2001. ISBN 0-312-28156-0
- New York: St Martin's Griffin, 2002. ISBN 0-312-30047-6

A Dutch translation – De Grand Tour – has also been published.
