= Spanish Steps (book) =

Book by Tim Moore about a walk to Santiago de Campostela

Front cover of the first (2004) edition, showing an illustration by Harriet Russell

Spanish Steps: One Man and His Ass on the Pilgrim Way to Santiago – whose subtitle was later replaced with Travels with My Donkey; titled for the US market Travels with My Donkey: One Man and His Ass on a Pilgrimage to Santiago – is a humorous account by Tim Moore of his walk with a donkey along the "French way" (Camino francés) among the pilgrimage routes to Santiago de Campostela in spring 2003.

First published in 2004, Spanish Steps was Moore's fifth book.

== Synopsis ==
The "French way" (Camino francés) among the Caminos de Santiago to Santiago de Campostela

Almost forty, having "the vague sense that my soul-ometer might benefit from a little recalibration", thinking that "it might be nice to imbue life with a little more ... depth", and despite lacking any "religious pursuit" other than "the scrupulous quest for precision" in time and weather data, Moore finds himself drawn to making a pilgrimage to Santiago de Campostela. Largely in order to avoid the need to carry a rucksack, Moore resolves to walk with a donkey. Despite learning of numerous dangers to and of donkeys, he perseveres, and eventually finds one for sale, meeting his companion-to-be, Shinto, in the French Pyrenees. The seller, Hanno, drives Moore and Shinto across the border to Valcarlos, where Moore and Shinto start their walk.

On the way to Roncesvalles, Moore first experiences Shinto's great reluctance to cross narrow bridges..

Moore describes the terrain, the weather, the progress, the wrong turnings, the search for and experience of food and lodging, and so forth. When not rain-sodden, hungry, or exhausted, he is receptive to the beauties and even the Christian iconography of the buildings along the route, a prime example being the Iglesia de Santa María of Los Arcos:

I looked ... to the distant altar, and found myself impressed, transfixed and at length swooningly overwhelmed by a great wall of gold, a Baroque retablo sumptuously alive with a profusion of gilded cherubs and virgins and Christ in all his forms.... With unblinking eyes I slowly scanned the walls: shoals of scallop shells, gourd-toting Santiagos and a tight mass of screaming, golden souls in purgatory; I turned behind and at the back beheld a glass coffin enclosing a serene saviour.... I thought again of the people who had walked here from all over Europe, stoked by the belief that in doing so they would earn their place in heaven. And just for a moment I thought they might have been right.

This particular experience leads to a less reverent portrait of Santiago (St James) himself. Similarly, Moore intersperses descriptions of his and Shinto's progress and tribulations with descriptions, never solemn, of such historical subjects as Domingo García, El Cid, St Anthony's fire, Sahagún, Suero de Quiñones, and the Knights Templar; as well as comments on modern or contemporary phenomena such as bullfighting, Franco, and the contrast between Spanish and British revelry.

Shinto displays the notorious stubbornness of donkeys, but not consistently: despite his fear of bridges (Note: "Bridges, shadows, streams, sudden loud noises, trains, plastic washing-up bowls ... these are just some of the many things which can stop this donkey dead in its tracks.") and refusal to cross what less resembles a cattle-grid than a "gerbil-grid", he is unfazed by an "interminable bridge" leading to Portomarín.

His lowest points are an encounter with "a very large, very dark donkey" who quickly becomes belligerent, two seemingly near-fatal collapses, a temporary transformation into "Berserko, the Mad Donkey", and terror of an ostrich.

To encourage Shinto to continue, Moore talks to him; and when that fails, he sings:

This was always a risk, as in addition to an abysmal taste in music he was implacably demanding.... [W]hat he wanted to hear – I will never know what initially possessed me to mumble the intro – was "We are the Champions".

(When Shinto is dejected, it might instead be "Michelle".)

At O Cebreiro, comparing Shinto with Sativa, a Dutch fellow-pilgrim's "small, plump and ostentatiously excitable mongrel", Moore gains an insight into, and appreciation of, Shinto's "ingrained sloth":

[It] was nothing more than the by-product of genius. Laziness is a luxury few animals have known and fewer still learnt to enjoy.... In the wild, of course, sloth usually meant death; for a domesticated animal the trade-off was a little more complicated. A beast of burden had to do his job or face being that dog's dinner, but there was nothing in the small print that said he had to do it with a smile or turn up for unpaid overtime.
I looked again at Sativa, scampering but ultimately subservient, and realised how much happier I felt with Shinto's free-spirited work-to-rule. His only duty was to himself, to do just enough to stop me throwing good barley after bad and abandoning him by the road.

The question of what to do with Shinto once he reaches Santiago is raised as early as Roncesvalles; at first Moore manages to put it out of his mind, but by the time they reach Sahagún it urgently needs an answer. Near Santiago (between Barbadelo and Portomarín), Hanno, who sold Shinto to Moore, telephones to say that he misses Shinto and would like him back; Moore and Shinto wait in Santiago for Hanno's arrival.

=== Companions ===
Moore travels all the way with Shinto, but also meets others at refugios (lit. 'refuges'), albergues (hostels), cafés and the like, and along the path.

On the way to Roncesvalles (and thus very early along the walk), Moore first encounters Petronella, the first of several pilgrims whom he will meet repeatedly along his walk: the others will include Evelyn, Jean-Michel, an Australian couple Moore refers to as "Total Shithouse" (Note: The inspiration for the name: "Every pilgrimage needs at least a couple of Australians. How novel it was, and how refreshing, to hear an irksome stretch of road recalled with feeling and volume as 'total shithouse'.") and "Mrs TS", Joe, Donald, Letje and Ramon. Irritated at first by Evelyn's use of "click" for "kilometre", Moore soon adopts it. (Note: Thus for example "Everyone else was aiming for Burgos, 20 clicks distant".)

Few seem religious. Of those staying overnight at a refugio in Santo Domingo:

Evelyn attended the odd mass, the bereaved old Chicagoan did so every day, so too a few of the big snorers and those wide-eyed young Hispanics. That was largely it: in the soundtrack to this pilgrimage, the droning chants of the pious went largely unheard....

Yet "This was still somehow a sacred undertaking: even if you didn't talk the talk, you had to walk the walk. The golden rule was this: you got to Santiago under your own steam." Thus after Moore's wife and three children join him at León, they continue by car as far west as Cacabelos, relieving Shinto of most of the baggage, joining Moore for meals, staying in the same hotels, and raising Shinto's spirits; but Moore and Shinto continue on foot.

After the four have returned home, Moore's brother Simon, recently laid off from work, joins him at Palas de Rei, and, with Shinto, the brothers walk together until Santiago.

=== Forerunners ===
From the mid-twentieth century, Santiago's "pilgrim-authors" have cited earlier examples of Santiago literature. The majority cite the eleventh-century Codex Calixtinus, and often also other accounts. Spanish Steps is no exception, and Moore's preparation for his walk involved much "footnoted product of academic industry."

Such "product" includes The Pilgrim's Guide to Santiago de Compostela, a translation by William Melczer of book five of the Codex Calixtinus; an unspecified translation (Note: Perhaps A Journey to the West by Domenico Laffi: The Diary of a Seventeenth-Century Pilgrim from Bologna to Santiago de Compostela, translated by James Hall.) of Domenico Laffi, Viaggio in Ponente a San Giacomo di Galitia e Finisterrae (1673); and Nancy Louise Frey, Pilgrim Stories: On and off the Road to Santiago: Journeys along an Ancient Way in Modern Spain (1998). Other past pilgrims mentioned are Andrew Borde and William Wey.

Beyond the academic and historical, books by Shirley MacLaine and Paulo Coelho are often cited, but for their unintended comedy value. MacLaine's The Camino is described as "a book so mad it howls at the moon, a book that with any name on its cover but that of a Hollywood legend would have had orderlies with soft, placatory smiles knocking on the author's door"; while "[Coelho's] effortfully esoteric novel The Pilgrimage marks him out as a serious rival to Shirley MacLaine as the camino's guffmeister general". (Note: Although Janice Douglas contrasts Moore's "hilarious account" with the "much more serious approach" of Cees Nooteboom in Roads to Santiago, neither Nooteboom nor his book seems to be mentioned in Spanish Steps.)

== Reception ==
One message taken from the book is plus ça change. The Observer review points out that Moore begins Spanish Steps

with a potted history of the monastery's origins, the battles between Moors and Christians in 10th-century Iberia and the transformation of a holy pilgrimage into a frenzy of drunk tourists, pickpockets and dodgy souvenirs (and we're still talking about the 10th century).

A number of reviewers commented, neutrally or appreciatively, that Moore does not look for any religious meaning.

A contrary opinion appears in the review for Independent by Peter Stanford (primarily a writer on religious matters). Stanford was tired by Moore's "laddish phrases" and his wit:

He suffers from what novelist Kathy Lette calls quip-lash. Few sentences are complete without a pun. Some are good but, after 300 pages, the overall effect, I'm afraid, borders on the idiotic."

Stanford objected to the book's irreligion:

Every budding comic needs a straight man and Moore finds his in his beast Shinto – his "braymate of the month". The name is well chosen, since it emphasises Moore's adolescent detachment from anything to do with the religion of Compostela. ... Spanish Steps may be of use as a beginners' guide to donkey care, but in terms of its subject, in essence it's a joke in poor taste. (Note: "[M]y Braymate of the Month": a pun on Playboy magazine's "playmate of the month".)

Paul Mansfield's review in the Daily Telegraph said that Moore and Bill Bryson "share a sense of the absurd and a love of the well-crafted comic phrase. Bryson, however, knows when to stop: Moore doesn't"; but that once he and Shinto have set off, "things improve. Moore ... writes well about the history of the camino, which began in the ninth century and for 600 years was one of the great spiritual journeys of the world."

Mansfield comments that "many of [Moore's] fellow pilgrims are of the emotionally displaced variety, and Moore describes them well." And:

By the middle of the book ... he has discovered both a latent spirituality and a sympathy for his fellow-travellers. "I was a better citizen, and the pilgrimage and my donkey had made me so." And a better writer, too: his literary flights of fancy, atrocious puns and knockabout humour are frequently hilarious.

During the brief period when Moore is accompanied by his family, "the 'pilgrimage' becomes a bland family holiday"; however, the section of the book that follows his and Shinto's arrival at Santiago

is the work of a fine writer, not a jester playing to the gallery. And Moore can be a very fine writer indeed. If I were him I would announce – doubtless to the horror of my publisher – that my next book will involve the serious pursuit of a serious subject."

== Editions ==
Spanish Steps: One Man and His Ass on the Pilgrim Way to Santiago:

- London: Jonathan Cape, 2004. ISBN 0-224-06265-4.

Spanish Steps: Travels with My Donkey:

- London: Vintage, 2005. ISBN 0-09-947194-9.

Travels with My Donkey: One Man and His Ass on a Pilgrimage to Santiago:

- New York: St Martin's, 2005. ISBN 0-312-32082-5.
- New York: St Martin's Griffin, 2006. ISBN 0-312-32083-3.

A German translation – Zwei Esel auf dem Jakobsweg. Wie ein Engländer sein Herz an Spanien verlor – has also been published.

== See also ==
- Travels with a Donkey in the Cévennes, a book by Robert Louis Stevenson

== Works cited ==
- Moore, Tim (2004). Spanish Steps: One Man and His Ass on the Pilgrim Way to Santiago. London: Jonathan Cape. ISBN 0-224-06265-4.
