= Frost on My Moustache =

Humorous travel book by Tim Moore

Front cover of the first British edition (with an illustration by Joe MaGee)

Frost on My Moustache: The Arctic Exploits of a Lord and a Loafer, Tim Moore's first book, published in 1999, is a "comic tribute" to Lord Dufferin's book Letters from High Latitudes, and "modelled on Dufferin's voyage".

== Synopsis ==
During the journey, Moore sporadically attempts to emulate Dufferin's fearless spirit and enthusiastic adventuring as portrayed in Dufferin's account, but comes to identify far more with Dufferin's permanently pessimistic and morose butler, Wilson.

== Style ==
Heidi Hansson observes:

The semi-fictional approach, the self-mocking tone and a clear distancing from the heroic paradigm [of Letters from High Latitudes] characterises also Tim Moore's sequel Frost on My Moustache, suggesting that Moore attempts to emulate Dufferin's journey not only geographically but also in terms of its literary representation.

== Reception ==
Writing in the Daily Express, Viv Groskop concluded a favourable review by claiming that the book is "one of the funniest travelogues you will ever read". Charlie Hill wrote in the Birmingham Daily Post that with so much of its author's self-deprecation the book "comes close to overstaying its welcome", yet concluded that "If this isn't the travel book of the year [...] I'd like to read better."

Reviewing the book for Scotland on Sunday, Tina Norris wrote that "[this] travel adventure written by [...] a man more whelk than tiger" was "refreshing". On seasickness and Moore's "gruelling bicycle ride across Iceland's lava fields" in particular, she commented:

Moore's deadpan bathetic descriptions of his experiences are interspersed with extracts from Dufferin's writing. The comparison between the former's gibbering inadequacies and the latter's courage and machismo is the source of much self-deprecating humour as Moore attempts to "out-Dufferin Dufferin".

== Title ==
The book's title refers to a joke Moore retells to his Scandinavian shipmates:

An Eskimo is driving across the tundra, [when his car breaks down]. He calls up the Inuit AA, and a breakdown truck appears. The mechanic opens the bonnet [...] and following a brief diagnosis looks up at the motorist. "Looks like you've blown a seal, mate." "No," says the driver, nervously fingering his upper lip, "it's just frost on my moustache."

== Editions ==
Frost on My Moustache: The Arctic Exploits of a Lord and a Loafer:

- London: Abacus, 1999. ISBN 0349111537
- London: Abacus, 2000. ISBN 0349111405
- New York: St Martin's, 2000. ISBN 0312253192
- New York: St Martin's Griffin, 2001. ISBN 0312270151

Translations into Dutch (IJspegels aan mijn snor) and Italian (Due baffi sottozero: avventura nell'Artico) have also been published.
