= Tim Moore (writer) =

British travel writer and humorist

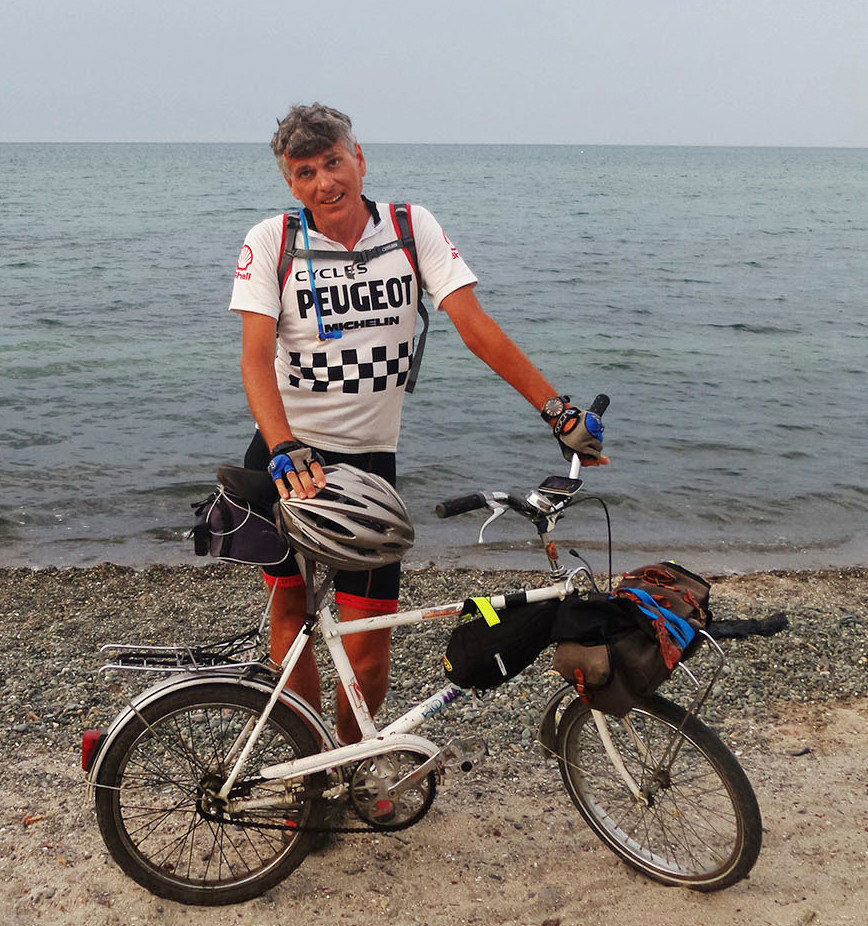
Tim Moore in 2015

Timothy Sebastian Perris Moore (born 18 May 1964 in Chipping Norton, Oxfordshire) is a British travel writer and humourist. He was educated at Latymer Upper School in Hammersmith. In addition to his travelogues, his writings have appeared in various publications including The Observer, The Telegraph, the Financial Times, Esquire, The Sunday Times, The Independent, and the Evening Standard. He was also briefly a journalist for the Teletext computer games magazine Digitiser, under the pseudonym Mr Hairs, alongside Mr Biffo (a.k.a. comedy and sitcom writer Paul Rose).

== Books ==
As the author of over a dozen books, Moore is "a journalist who specialises in gruellingly comedic reenactments".

The first book (1999) was Frost on My Moustache, in which Moore attempted to trace Lord Dufferin's northerly voyage described in Letters from High Latitudes. Moore's version included a bicycle ride across Iceland; further descriptions of his own bicycle rides have been French Revolutions (2001), Gironimo! (2014), and Vuelta Skelter (2021), related to the Tour de France, Giro d'Italia, and Vuelta a España respectively; and The Cyclist Who Went out in the Cold (2016), from the far north of Europe to the Balkans, along a route close to the Iron Curtain.

Moore's second book, Continental Drifter (2001; in the US, The Grand Tour) traced Thomas Coryat's account (in Coryats Crudities) of his proto-Grand Tour, but this time doing the journey in a decrepit Rolls-Royce.

Other books have included Do Not Pass Go (2002), based on the British version of the board game Monopoly (and made into an ITV programme in 2004); Spanish Steps (2004; in the US, Travels with My Donkey), on Camino de Santiago; I Believe in Yesterday (2008), on historical reenactment; You Are Awful (but I Like You) (2012), a journey through Britain's lowest-rated towns, hotels, restaurants, etc, in its most-despised car; and Another Fine Mess (2018) from the east coast of the US to the west by Ford Model T.

In 2014, Moore released his ninth book, Gironimo! Riding the Very Terrible 1914 Tour of Italy, which recounts his 2012 rerunning of the difficult 1914 Giro d'Italia. For this he used a period bicycle and wore a reproduction period costume.

Asked in 2001 for his five favourite books, Moore named Lucky Jim (Kingsley Amis), Scoop (Evelyn Waugh), The Portable Dorothy Parker, the film script of Withnail & I (Bruce Robinson), and The Thurber Carnival; asked in 2006 to choose his favourite travel destination, Moore selected Ásbyrgi canyon (in Iceland).

At the British Press Awards in March 2005, Moore "won the Travel Writer of the Year title for three pieces he wrote for Escape in 2004. [These were] articles on Egypt and Cyprus; easing the pain of turning 40 with a family holiday to Venice; and ... about Jersey". (Note: "Escape" was a series in The Observer. The three pieces were presumably (i) Moore, Tim (5 December 2004). "From poolside to pyramids – a tale of two holidays". The Observer. London – via The Guardian. (ii) Moore, Tim (10 October 2004). "Our room with a view eases birthday blues". The Observer. London – via The Guardian. (iii) Moore, Tim (22 August 2004). "Tax exiles and owners of piggy banks welcome". The Observer. London – via The Guardian. See also "2004 British Press Awards (date of the awards: March 15, 2005)" within "Press Awards Winners 2000–2008". The Press Awards. Society of Editors. Archived from the original on 26 June 2016.)

== Personal life ==
Moore lives in London.

== Bibliography ==
- Frost on My Moustache: The Arctic Exploits of a Lord and a Loafer (1999) (ISBN 0-224-07780-5)
- Continental Drifter: Taking the Low Road with the First Grand Tourist (ISBN 0-349-11464-1) (2001) (published in the US as The Grand Tour: The European Adventure of a Continental Drifter) (ISBN 0-312-30047-6)
- French Revolutions: Cycling the Tour de France (2001) (ISBN 0-09-943382-6)
- Do Not Pass Go: From the Old Kent Road to Mayfair (2002) (ISBN 0-09-943386-9)
- Spanish Steps: One Man and His Ass on the Pilgrim Way to Santiago (2004) (ISBN 0-09-947194-9) (published in the US as Travels with My Donkey: One Man and His Ass on a Pilgrimage to Santiago) (ISBN 0-312-32083-3)
- Nul Points (2006) (ISBN 0-224-07780-5)
- I Believe in Yesterday: My Adventures in Living History (2008) (ISBN 0-224-07781-3)
- You are Awful (but I Like You): Travels in Unloved Britain (2012) (ISBN 0-224-09011-9)
- Gironimo! Riding the Very Terrible 1914 Tour of Italy (2014) (ISBN 978-0224092074)
- The Cyclist Who Went out in the Cold: Adventures Along the Iron Curtain (2016) (ISBN 978-0224100205)
- Another Fine Mess: Across the USA in a Ford Model T (2018) (ISBN 978-1787290297)
- Vuelta Skelter: Riding the Remarkable 1941 Tour of Spain (2021) (ISBN 978-1787333055)
