= Church of St Peter and St Paul, Odcombe =

Church in Somerset, England

Church of St Peter and St Paul
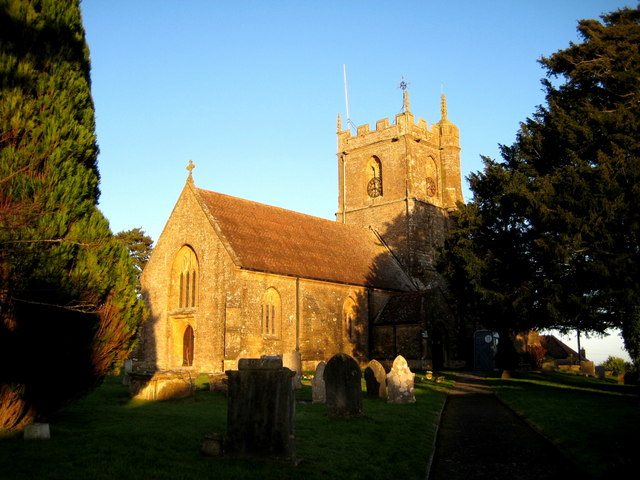

- Location within Somerset
- 50.9365°N 2.7031°W
- Location: Odcombe, Somerset, England

Listed Building – Grade II*
- Official name: Church of St Peter and St Paul
- Designated: 19 April 1961
- Reference no.: 1241492

The Anglican Church of St Peter and St Paul in Odcombe, Somerset, England was built in the 13th century. It is a Grade II* listed building.

== History ==
The church has 13th-century origins and was restored in the 15th.

In 1874 transepts were added and the church restored.

The parish is part of the Ham Hill benefice within the Diocese of Bath and Wells.

== Architecture ==
The Ham stone building has clay tile roofs. It consists of a three-bay nave and two-bay chancel with transepts, vestry and porch. The central two-stage tower is supported by corner buttresses with pinnacles. It is decorated with gargoyles. The tower holds six bells.

Most of the interior fittings are from the 19th century, but the purbeck stone font is much older. There is a memorial to the travel writer Thomas Coryate who lived in the village around 1600, and a replica of a pair of his shoes.

A headstone in yellow Jaisalmer stone lies embedded in the front lawn of the church to mark a memorial service to poet Dom Moraes (1938-2004).

== See also ==
- List of ecclesiastical parishes in the Diocese of Bath and Wells
