= Nul Points (book) =

Book by Tim Moore about the Eurovision Song Contest

Front cover of the 2007 edition, with an illustration by Vicki Gausden

Nul Points is a book by Tim Moore, first published in 2006, about the fourteen performances in the Eurovision Song Contest that, since 1975, were awarded no points by any other participating nation. Hoping to meet and interview all their singers, he succeeded in interviewing most, and was surprised by the variation both in how they saw the event in retrospect and in how it had affected them at the time and thereafter.

== Synopsis ==
=== Nul Points ===
Watching a videotape of the 1989 edition of the British television programme A Song for Europe, and reading about the subsequent career and life of the singer of its least successful performance, Tim Moore realizes that there is still hope for those who get the worst possible score in a contest at this level. But A Song for Europe selected the British contestant for the Eurovision Song Contest (ESC): What, Moore wonders, about the performers of those songs that had won at this national level but that, at the ESC final, had not only come last but had failed to score even a single point from any nation's jury or viewing public – songs that had scored "nul points"? (Note: "Nul points", pronounced "nul pwah", is no more than pseudo-Gallic nonsense: to me it's nul points, to others it's nil points, to the French it's nul point, not a single point. More arrestingly still, the words have never been heard on a Eurovision stage: jury points are announced from one to 12, and no compere has ever done a bilingual run-down to those depths of the scoreboard.)

Reading the BBC's statement that "Eurovision's most famous loser ... went on to run Norway's only private pub-brewery and a naturopathic pharmacy", Moore pictures Jahn Teigen as "a survivor with an extraordinary tale to tell", and thinks that meeting all fourteen "nul points" awardees would provide "fourteen stories to hear, fourteen shaming wrongs to right".

There follows a brief history of the ESC, and, since Abba's "Waterloo" of 1974, of the decline in the quality of its entrants; whereby "as the quality threshold was lowered, so we got our kicks watching those who tripped over it most spectacularly".

=== Norway, 1978 ===
The second chapter is devoted to the song "Mil etter mil" ('Mile After Mile') and Jahn Teigen, who sang it for Norway in 1978.

Moore has on DVD not only Teigen's ESC performance but also the Norway-only performance that selected him for the ESC. In this earlier performance, "Mil etter mil" – "a song whose reputation alone still reduces good people to hooting, jeering malevolence" – "proves itself a simple, pleasing composition". But in the ESC performance, the song, Teigen's rendering of it (both his singing and his body language) and the orchestration were grossly mismatched.

Moore easily contacts Teigen and arranges to meet, in Oslo. He finds that Teigen received a hero's welcome on his return to Norway, that he continued to release records and enter contests; and that, aside from a dark period of a decade or so from 1983, he has been doing rather well – his current employment primarily being the production of recordings of amateur groups.

=== Norway, 1981 ===
Moore pursues his plan of meeting with singers in the chronological order of their songs' ESC appearances. Finn Kalvik sang "Aldri i Livet" ('Never in My Life'), again for Norway. As performed within Norway, the song was good; although having Kalvik immobile throughout would not work in the ESC, Moore supposes.

In the ESC, "he's perched cross-legged on a tall white bar stool"; this "[makes the song's] gentle plucking and background warbles grate and simper rather than soothe".

Indeed, watching Bucks Fizz' performance of "Making Your Mind Up", which won this contest, "It occurs to me that it's possible to spot a Eurovision loser – and perhaps even a winner – with the sound off."

Via email, Kalvik seems happy to meet and talk with Moore, who delightedly departs for Ko Samui, where Kalvik awaits him. Kalvik seems youthful, successful, and happy. When the conversation turns to the ESC, "Finn's autopsy report is the most complete I will hear from any nul-pointer." Nobody expressed any sympathy, which he might have received had he returned to Norway; instead, he flew to Sweden, where, to the dismay of many Norwegians, he sang in Swedish. As for "Aldri i livet", it had been composed by Kalvik and produced by Benny Andersson, so it would have been hard for Kalvik to ascribe some of the blame to others. He turned to painting, but his singing career brought ridicule (particularly from the television programme Åpen post). Kalvik's account of this makes his interview increasingly strained. Moore escapes from Ko Samui as soon as he can. He reflects that "[Kalvik] lived for half a year in paradise, but not to escape his homeland's inclement weather so much as its inclement inhabitants."

=== Finland, 1982 ===
"[T]he threat of nuclear confrontation was the dominant issue of the day ... and nowhere was the threat more tangible than frontline Finland". Jim Pembroke wrote the music for a song about this, "Nuku pomminn" ('Bomb out'), "[whose] four power-pop bar chords formed a simple framework for its furious lyrical polemic". Viewing Kojo performing this for Finland in the 1982 ESC, Moore reflects that "it's difficult to imagine how he could look much more Finnish: he's one part Billy Idol to nine parts rally driver". It's a performance ill-suited to the ESC, during which:

Kojo ... smacks himself, really quite hard, on the side of the head, as if the bad thoughts were coming back. Apparently quite pleased with this action or its effects, he immediately does it again. By the time the song reaches its climax, a repeated refrain of "Pom-miin", he's slapping his temples with the frenzy of a bereaved Iranian.... After a theatrical snore that no one outside Finland can know relates to "Nuku Pommiin"'s warning of an apathetic continent sleeping its way towards apocalypse, there's a giant, discordant orchestral crash....

Moore and Kojo arrange to meet in Helsinki, where Kojo reveals that he is currently occupied with "a golf driving range system that you can build out on to the sea". As for "Nuku pomminn", "I hate the song, but I like [the no-war message]." After his "nul points" had been announced, he was filmed smirking, because:

For us this was a joke, this Eurovision thing. It's big for the record company guys, but bullshit for us. We went out to have some laughs, and we did.

But, he continues, this wasn't so for the Finnish people, many of whom took out on him their resentment at his loss and his insouciance over it.

=== 1983 ===
In 1983, two songs were awarded "nul points".

==== Turkey, 1983 ====
Çetin Alp died in 2004, so Moore knew he would be unable to meet the singer of "the most extraordinary of all the 943 songs performed [at the ESC] since Jetty Paerl took to that Lugano stage in 1956". "The millions who beheld Çetin's three minutes are unlikely to forget them".

The few songs that precede Alp's "Opera", Turkey's entry, are anodyne. By contrast, Alp is "part Borat, part Leslie Crowther"; and his backing band, the Short Waves, "a perplexing medley of brocade, towering wigs and Austin Powers velveteen ruff-frills" are more arresting. Their "Opera" ("[a]n opera about opera") was devised to avoid falling afoul of the requirement to use the native language. It starts by repeating the word "opera". "Within seconds of [an] introductory howl, Çetin's resonant baritone is roaming uneasily across a musical landscape whose jarring, rearing evolutions have been defying effective description for over twenty years." And he looks uncomfortable delivering it.

"Opera" has been ridiculed, but Moore respects it:

I defy anyone to listen to "Opera" only once. By any standards it is an extraordinary piece of music; put it on a Eurovision stage, and amongst the homogenous, formulaic ballads and pop froth it stands proud as a beacon of bold idiosyncrasy. In three mad minutes, it rewrote, defaced and ate the Eurovision rulebook.

==== Spain, 1983 ====
The song performed immediately after "Opera" in 1983 was "¿Quién maneja mi barca?" ('Who's steering my boat?'), sung for Spain by Remedios Amaya. She "casts a deeply concerned gaze across the audience.... [P]erhaps she's still as thrown as the rest of us by what has just taken place on the stage".

Amaya was a performer of "flamenco rock"; her "¿Quién maneja mi barca?" is "a sort of bold Arabian tango". The process by which she was chosen was criticized, her odd dress was a last-minute and ridiculed choice; and she was young and participated in the ESC more out of deference than any enthusiasm.

Decades after its use in the ESC, the song gets some praise. Moore watches it with high expectations; however: "I don't know much about flamenco, but I know what I don't like. And I'm about to listen to it for three minutes."

For her "ululating, off-key caterwaul", Moore invites the reader: "Imagine an emotional mourner being shaken violently by the shoulders and you're getting close." Her face becomes stern, and "If someone doesn't identify this mystery navigator pretty soon, we're all going to suffer for it."

Amaya blamed the score of "nul points" on bad luck. Sections of the Spanish media, of various political slants, hotly disagreed. Amaya retreated from public view, returning with the 1997 album Me voy contigo, which sold 150,000 copies, "comfortably the most successful solo release by any nul-point artist".

Moore gets in touch with an anglophone employee of the company managing Amaya. The employee seems helpful at first, but as time goes by she cites one obstacle or delay after another and her tone becomes brusque. Moore infers that Amaya simply does not want to meet him, and so gives up the attempt.

Moore reflects that the winner ends an era in which French-language songs had much of a chance, and thus is:

a poignantly eloquent reminder that Eurovision has failed in its proudest ambition. American Forces Radio might no longer present a threat to the European way of life, but only because the artistic values it espoused have already leached into almost everything we watch and listen to....

=== Turkey, 1987 ===
Seyyal Taner sang "Şarkım Sevgi Üstüne" ('My song is about love') for Turkey in 1987. (Note: Taner shared the credits with Grup Lokomotif; resentment over this is a subject of animated discussion between Taner and Sökmen.)

Moore easily finds her telephone number, and soon they arrange to meet in Istanbul. Together with Melis Sökmen (who appeared with Taner in the ESC), and another associate, they arrive at a restaurant, where Taner is treated as a celebrity. His interviewing skills impaired by a rash consumption of rakı, Moore manages to learn about Taner's involvement with Los Bravos and appearances in the films Los Chicos con las Chicas and Villa Rides: she recounts her life as a teenager enthusiastically, even if the tale is sometimes hard to square with what others say. After appearing in photo comics, she tried singing, and thanks to her figure and verve, "at twenty-three she steps on-stage with a repertoire of four songs and before she steps off Turkey has a new sensation". Her popularity peaked around 1977, and the decline was swift. But she had a hit in 1986, and won the national competition to appear at the ESC (held in Brussels).

Sökmen fondly remembers their time in Brussels. Taner, not so much: she recalls being asked political questions in a press conference, and responding "We are there for music, we are non-politics, why are you asking us this stupid, boring, politic questions?" Sökmen recalls the English presenter (whom Moore identifies as Terry Wogan, an Irish employee of the BBC) saying "Here are the ugly Turkish people"; Taner concurs.

Moore plays "Şarkım Sevgi Üstüne" on his MP3 player. The song starts with "a burst of quasi-kasbah ululating keyboard". Sökmen enjoys it from the beginning; "[s]lowly, Seyyal's look of sullen indifference melts into resigned indulgence".

Unlike other ESC failures, thinks Moore, the song is neither mad nor bad. At first, its "breathless, shimmying vigour" may bring to mind a television commercial; but it is "a shot in the arm after the shot-in-the-head, blandly plodding Euro-pap that's gone before and will come after" – and thus a stark contrast to the winner, "the fearsomely insipid Johnny Logan".

It is easy to see what doomed the song:

Two sparky young women [Taner and Sökmen] in white gloves and fringed jackets, bouncing around in energetic formation: you want to look closer. But five blokes behind them, wearing and doing the same: you want to turn over.

And after less than one minute:

The background chap with the horridest haircut ... plucks the mike from Seyyal's stand and strides towards the nearest camera.... A look of exasperated strain contorts [his reddening face]: a compelling portrayal of advanced constipation, which when he begins to sing intensifies into one of mortal agony, as if he's just been shot in the back....

Taner and Sökmen blame the conductor, Garo Mafyan, who, "falling victim to what Melis calls 'Eurovision Stress Syndrome', whisked the orchestra to the song's conclusion fourteen seconds early".

The score angered Taner; on her return to Turkey, she disguised herself and busied herself with activities outside music. When she returned to recording, the music was dated: "Too Turkish for Eurovision, she was now too European for Turkey." However, she has recently had a role in a soap opera and says she is satisfied.

The next day, hung over from plentiful rakı and wine, Moore takes a taxi to the Grand Bazaar. Two hours later, he emerges from it "rather saddened", as:

the vast bulk of the bazaar's 25,000 resident merchants had been energetically hawking precisely the same T-shirts and baseball caps that had filled every stall in Koh Samui.... A song contest organised by a committee of state-controlled broadcasters to foster European unity, a celebration of cultural diversity, a common front against the greedily creeping forces of transatlantic culture – oh, how quaint. [Thatcherism] had kicked that whole business hard up the arse. Market forces, small government, consumer choice. And now that we'd been given the choice, this was what we'd chosen: a world of sweatshopped, Yank-branded crap, piled high, sold cheap.

=== Austria, 1988 ===
"Lisa Mona Lisa", performed for Austria in the 1988 ESC, is "a musical nonentity; too many words, not enough tune". Delivering it, Wilfried "ploddingly hunts for tune and meter, never too far off but never quite on". And the song's finale is "a chance to blast the audience flat with his maximum, unleashed throat-power".

Preparing to meet Wilfried, Moore reads that for a time after the ESC he disappeared from view, but that he later resumed touring and issuing albums. Although his email to Wilfried gets a fast and encouraging reply from Wilfried's wife, saying that he is away on a short tour, Wilfried does not respond, and he and Moore do not meet.

=== Iceland, 1989 ===
Daníel (Note: This is an Icelandic name. "Haraldsson" is a patronymic, not a surname; the singer is normally referred to by his first name, "Daníel".) sang "Það sem enginn sér" ('What No One Sees') for Iceland in 1989. "[D]espite a marginally dodgy high note, [Daníel] has a fine and surprisingly powerful voice" and "it's a decent song". But:

Sadly, as I'm now well aware, singing a good song well has never been at the top of a jury's checklist. Eurovision success – and more particularly failure – is decided by eyes, not ears.

And "Daníel looks like a remorseful urchin turning up at court in his fat uncle's wedding suit." The way he holds himself, his expressions, and his gaze are each unlikely to score ESC points. At the end, "[h]e almost grimly acknowledges the applause" and leaves quickly.

Moore is surprised by Daníel's website, although not by its omission of any mention of the ESC:

The compact resumé confirms what I've already learnt from my nul-pointers: that a career in entertainment is blighted more drastically by Eurovision triumph than scoreboard-propping ignominy. Win and you're forever shackled to whatever it was you sang, which by well-worn precedent is unlikely to age well. Lose, and you can reinvent yourself.

Moore has unexpected difficulty getting Daníel to respond, but eventually gets an offer to meet in Brussels. Daníel drives him from the station to the Château de Rivieren (then in Icelandic ownership), where the two converse for hours. But he does not want to talk about the ESC, eventually saying:

[It] means nothing, in terms of music, in terms of artistry, it's just a silly competition. Sometimes it's funny to watch, but it's really sad too, because the music, you know, it's lousy.

The fact that a participant says this surprises Moore. Daníel says he agreed to do this song for the Icelandic ESC qualifier because its composer (Valgeir Guðjónsson, whose professionalism he respected) invited him: he did it "[f]or the experience". He was determined to do a good job with it, but feared winning, which would interrupt his final college examinations and the first album of his band, Ný Dönsk. "He was the first performer I'd met not raised to respect Eurovision."

But Daníel won. Moore pictures him in Lausanne, "out on a stage he doesn't want to be on, wearing strides he doesn't want to wear, about to sing a song he doesn't want to sing." In the performance, he looks uncomfortable and at the end inexplicably kisses what looks like a crucifix (but is instead the hammer of Thor). Daníel remembers very little of what happened after receiving "nul points"; and Moore comments: "All the succour and balm I'm accustomed to dispensing at this point splurges uselessly out over a wound that has never existed."

Afterwards, Daníel joined GusGus and also put out solo albums. Moore is played his latest; it is "a consistently eerie work, with mournful strings underscored by Dan's breathy, sinister musings on overwhelming darkness and other forms of void". This is "a laconic, understated anti-star, almost dismissive of his undoubted talents".

=== Austria, 1991 ===
Thomas Forstner had sung "Nur ein Lied" ('Only a Song') as Austria's entry for the 1989 ESC, and it had come fifth, "the best Austrian result since 1976". In Austria, "[h]e was, quite suddenly, a huge star, [his] big-haired choirboy look irresistible to pre-teen Austro-screamers and their mothers alike." For Rome in 1991, ORF chose him again.

"His was a three-pronged assault on Eurovision glory: a host-flattering musical tribute ('Venedig in Regen', or 'Venice in the Rain'), a sparkly outfit, and his hugest-ever hair"; however, the costume and hairstyle misfired and the performance "came off as a "study in cheesy bombast".

Immediately after delivering the song, Forstner seems to have disappeared. Eventually an acquaintance of Moore's emails him Forstner's address. Moore writes, but there is no response.

=== Lithuania, 1994 ===
Thanks to the collapse of the Soviet Union, the Warsaw Pact and the OIRT (the socialist nations' answer to the EBU), the EBU gained a number of nations in 1993, thereby transforming the ESC of the following year – although "Musically, it's the dullest Eurovision yet by a vast margin, a dismally determined assault on the lowest common denominator", and "[t]he debutant nations ... are a particular disappointment". "Lopšinė mylimai" ('Sweetheart's Lullaby'), sung for Lithuania by Ovidijus Vyšniauskas, turns out to be "another rent-a-ballad, ... delivered with as much emotional sincerity as [Vyšniauskas'] conspicuously ill-chosen wardrobe will allow, which is very, very little". Yet "[i]n a year of soul-siphoning musical tedium, the song ... was just another drop of cheese in the fondue, no better than a dozen or more rivals but certainly no worse".

Moore has little trouble locating Vyšniauskas and – despite "the most unnerving telephonic interchange of my adult life" – arranging to meet him, in Kaunas.

Moore, Vyšniauskas, and his interpreter meet in Moore's hotel, "in an atmosphere of slightly circumspect affability". The interpreter has limited proficiency in English, yet Moore can understand that the ESC was unknown to Vyšniauskas until he found himself in it. The invitation to participate in the ESC had come late and demanded a rush, so Vyšniauskas had "banged out a tune 'in three minutes'" and then telephoned Gintaras Zdebskis for lyrics.

Back in Lithuania after the contest, Vyšniauskas was criticized and felt low for around one year; but now he is issuing "greatest hits" albums, doing shows, fishing, and hunting.

The meeting breaks up rather awkwardly, as Vyšniauskas wonders why Moore is so interested in the ESC appearance; Moore is shocked to infer that singer and interpreter have not realized that his only interest is in those having scored "nul points". Back in his room, he plays Vyšniauskas' latest CD: "I desperately want this to be the most rewarding auditory experience of my life, but of course it isn't."

=== Norway, 1997 ===
As in 1983, two songs were awarded "nul points".

Moore describes the performance of "San Francisco" by Tor Endresen in 1997 for Norway as professionally done but the song itself as curiously dated and clichéd: "the ORF commentator delivers a précis of the lyrical themes about to be explored: 'Woodstock, Jimi Hendrix, make love not war, und flower power'", and says that the song "quickly proves itself an even lazier parade of period catchphrases than the ORF guy has led me to believe". Moore infers that it derives from "Rock 'n' Roll Kids", a "crusted dollop of nostalgia" that had won for Ireland with "the torpid, no-tune namechecking of Elvis, Jerry Lee and blue suede shoes".

Soon Moore is off to Oslo again. In his room in the Hotel Bristol, Endresen describes his love of the music of the 1960s and his path to qualification for the ESC. As for the ESC performance, he blames having to make a late switch from his preferred song to "San Francisco", a change in the jury system, poor sound, and that "it's harder for a guy on his own – the girls get a few votes just for turning up".

Post-ESC, Endresen says that Jahn Teigen, Bobbysocks (who won the ESC in 1985) and he happily perform together, and that unlike another Norwegian musician (whom he will not name) he is not bitter about the whole affair. Moore: "If Jahn embraced failure and Finn ran halfway round the world to escape it, then Tor took the sensible and very human middle way, being really, really pissed off for a while, and then getting over it."

Endresen describes his concert appearances and album sales, but Moore later finds "the last of Tor's four albums to break the Norwegian top forty dropped out the week after Dublin".

Their conversation ends, and, remembering how Teigen described himself as "not a typical Norwegian musician", Moore reflects that "that's exactly what Tor is: a family entertainer, a straightforward, down-the-line pro with a wife and five kids back in Bergen".

=== Portugal, 1997 ===
Célia Lawson also received "null points" in 1997, for Portugal's entry, "Antes do adeus".

Moore starts the chapter with a brief history of Portugal's entries: lyrics with, first, subtle political dissidence during the Salazar era, and then celebration of the era's end. However, "Perhaps satisfied at having produced the honed antithesis of the contest's lyrical dementia, or perhaps belatedly recognising that this sort of stuff wasn't doing them any favours with the juries, Portugal abruptly changed tack."

Antes do adeus ('Before goodbye') is "an understated cocktail-bar smoocher". In Moore's opinion, neither song nor singer merits "null points". After he has tried various telephone numbers said to be Lawson's, she calls him back, and they arrange to meet at the Palácio in Sintra.

Lawson says that "Rock, heavy metal – it's my first love." She joined the metal band V12, yet was happy to be invited by the composer Thilo Krasmann to compete towards the ESC. Yet as for her stay in Dublin (hosting the year's ESC), "there was an economic grievance: Celia was personally made to foot the bill for some or all of the excess beds in her room, and some or all of the excess nights she was obliged to book...."

As for the performance, she accidentally skipped one verse, and therefore had to repeat the last one. ("The orchestra, my singers, they did such a good job to cover it ... but what a mistake!")

Now she regrets that she ever appeared in the ESC. There have been royalties from its frequent use on the radio, but hearing it is difficult, as "the lyrics talk about a ... painful situation in my love history". Quickly released, her first album was a commercial flop. Her joint composition of a best-selling album by Excesso brought more royalties but no demand for more such work. After briefly working as a cabin attendant for TAP, she returned to music, but with little success.

After a short walk, they pause, and Lawson divulges much more. "'So many bad things happen to me ... and yes: they all began with Eurovision'."

In the train back to Lisbon, Moore hears a sample of an album that Lawson says she, under a different name, is ready to release. He is happy to find that it is excellent; but there is no release date, "or possibly even an interested label". On their arrival, Moore assures her "that she's due a break, and that in spite of all her setbacks she's still doing things that everyone around ... could only dream of, and if that's her life, then it can't be bad".

=== Switzerland, 1998 ===
Gunvor Guggisberg sang Lass' ihn for Switzerland" in 1998. Moore emails her; she replies that she does not want to talk about the ESC and hopes he understands.

Moore indeed understands, and does not attempt to change Guggisberg's mind. Because "bounteous online biographies [provide a] barely credible catalogue of scandal, betrayal and relentless humiliation".

Singing from the age of five and a national champion tap-dancer at thirteen, Guggisberg worked hard towards her participation in the ESC. While employed at the Federal Military Department, "she idly put her name down for Switzerland's two biggest talent shows, and rose to abrupt prominence by winning both".

Like Lawson, she entered the ESC without having made a professional recording. She often appeared in Blick, but "[a]lmost every profile, questionnaire and interview [it] published was snidely embedded with undermining revelations". However, indignation about Gunnisberg was limited to Switzerland, as the wider world was preoccupied with the Israeli contestant (and eventual winner), Dana International, and, to a lesser extent, with the antics of the German contestant Guildo Horn.

Moore rates Gunnisberg's ESC appearance as costumed rashly (given the talk surrounding her) but "capable". The major problem is Egon Egemann's "indulgently ruminative violin solo".

Back in Switzerland, salacious news stories of Gunnisberg's alleged misdeeds continued to appear. Soon she was reduced to singing along to recorded backing in provincial beer festivals. A film about her by Paul Riniker added to the misery. Currently "a marketing coordinator for an international food company", she also sometimes performs at weddings. Blick continues to publish tawdry stories about her.

=== United Kingdom, 2003 ===
Jemini consisted of Gemma Abbey and Chris Cromby, who performed "Cry baby" for the ESC in 2003. (Note: Other, unrelated songs have shared this title; this song was written for the purpose.) As performed at the ESC, it started as a "pleasantly choreographed instrumental"; but "when Gemma parted those delicate, glistening lips, what came out was the worst noise heard on a Eurovision stage in the contest's forty-seven-year history", as she is half an octave out – "a moment that lays vicious waste to the theory that it is always possible to judge a nul-pointer with the sound turned off". She seems to know that something is wrong but not how to correct it.

Abbey and Cromby have jobs selling cars and clothes respectively when Moore interviews them, but nevertheless have a manager. All three meet Moore in Liverpool, and talk about earlier ESCs:

[Cromby] didn't realise Cliff and Lulu were already established stars when they appeared at Eurovision.... Having lived all their young lives in the era of Terry-tainted teasing, these two are simply too young to remember a time when Eurovision was taken seriously.

Rehearsals before Jemini's arrival in Riga had been inadequate, costume preparation had been incompetent, and "[n]o less inept were the managerial team's attempts at spin-doctoring and story-planting", easily eclipsed by the marketing of the Russian contestants tATu (whose stage show, a "lavish extravaganza", was another contrast).

Shortly before the performance, Abbey and Cromby, in Abbey's words, "realised everyone else had these little ear monitors, so they could hear themselves above the backing track". Unable to obtain these in time, Abbey started at the wrong pitch. (Note: Later, as Moore views the performance for A Song for Europe, "a gratifying truth becomes belatedly apparent: Gemma Abbey can sing, and sing beautifully".)

At the time, many attributed the score of "nul points" to the unpopularity of Britain's participation in the 2003 invasion of Iraq, which had started just two months earlier. Moore dismisses this: "[O]f the twenty-six nations competing that night, precisely half were fully paid-up supporters of Operation Enduring Freedom."

Moore says that Britain's ESC failure was "precipitated by years of ratcheting complacency". Unlike its overseas counterparts, A Song for Europe was broadcast at an unpopular time and thus had few viewers; and, in contrast to the winning, Turkish contestant, Britain fielded "a pair who had yet to release a record and whose most significant professional engagement was as support act to a Pop Idol reject". This was combined with xenophobia; and "If the rest of Europe was punishing us, it wasn't for getting in bed with the Yanks so much as what we'd caught off them in consequence."

But this reflected Britain's reduced musical importance in the world outside the ESC; and as for Liverpool (home of both the Beatles and Jemini), "the feted birthplace of world-conquering British pop had now doubled as its tawdry mausoleum".

After Jemini returned to Britain, criticism and ridicule in the mass media continued – though Wogan repeated his allegation of "post-Iraq backlash", with which the song's composer, Martin Isherwood, agreed. Although Jemini were received amicably at their concerts, and although the single of "Cry baby" made the top twenty, interest in them rapidly declined.

=== 2005 ===
Britain's A Song for Europe had almost selected Jordan for the 2005 ESC: "an ugly lack of respect, made uglier by the lazy arrogance of our [i.e. Britain's] top-table status: as one of the EBU's 'big four', we were exempt from the semi-final". But Moore flies to Kiev. Once there: "In six stops, my journey from Darnytsia station offers the complete post-Soviet experience, a lingering portrait of a nation caught between Intervision past and Eurovision future."

The next day is "the city's big day, its Olympics, its Expo": the day of the ESC final. Kiev is cleaned up; and "I still can't quite believe what hosting the final means to these people". At the Palace of Sport, viewing the parade of contestants, he is struck by the "heart-rending pointlessness of all this eager excitement" as "for almost all,... this would be it: the beginning, middle and end of their celebrity careers".

The contest proper takes place, and for Moore the "chaff de la chaff" is the German entry, sung by Gracia – but all he asks is that nobody gets "nul points" (and that the polarized audience reactions to the Russian entry do not trigger a civil war). For a long time as the incoming points are announced, no nation awards any to the UK; Moore despondently imagines himself having to interview Javine, Britain's entrant. His account ends as Ireland awards eight points to her song, "Touch My Fire".

== Reception ==
In a review for The Irish Times, Karen Fricker called Moore's quest to find and interview the fourteen recipients of "nul points" misguided. First, asking those who have been publicly humiliated to relive what Moore himself calls "light entertainment's ultimate indignity" "as fodder for someone else's comedic stylings" was cruel. Secondly, he completely misunderstood ESC: "by focusing solely on performers, he 'blames the messenger' (as "he half-heartedly acknowledges"), "[misrepresenting] the contest as being about individuals when it's really driven by collective interests". Fricker wrote that "[t]he most interesting and memorable part of the book is ... the performers' stories; and that "[y]ou can't help but be inspired by many of the musicians' ingenuity and resilience, and there is something engaging and even informative in the book's portrait of the less glamorous side of Europe's pop musical industries". But "it's not really about the nul-pointers at all, it's about Moore", who provided:

some national self-flagellation about Britain's Wogan-led indulgence in "ignorance and its sidekick xenophobia".... Moore needed to include himself in this critique: the entire book is an exercise in laughing at foreigners.

Writing in The Independent, Tom Cox found Moore's quest seemingly odd, but not so among Moore's books; and comparable with Andrew Smith's in Moondust. "[I]n the lives of those [Moore] meets, there is frequently more heartbreak and eccentricity than in the most hard-bitten serious rocker's". Cox wrote that the subject matter was ripe for comedy, but that the interviewees provided "wonderfully odd nuggets", concluding that "[The book is] funny, unhinged, and you're not quite sure it needs to exist. But, in the end, you're glad it does."

Reviewing it for the Sydney Morning Herald, Bruce Elder called it "entertaining and hilarious" and said that "for laugh-out-loud holiday reading, this is about as good as it gets" – yet called it a "work of genuine scholarship".

In the London Evening Standard, Paul Connolly demurred: "This is as much a study of fortitude as it is about music, and while there are some hilarious Moore moments, this is not at all a laugh-a-minute book."

Steven Poole wrote in The Guardian that "The book is perhaps a bit too long, but it hums and strums along genially, with a generous and unkitsch affection."

In a swingeing review for The Independent on Sunday, the writer took the charge of prolixity to an extreme, but on other matters disagreed with Poole:

It's 350 pages of Moore's smug sarcasm, where every sentence is too long and every verb and noun are "amusingly" qualified with arch adverbs and adjectives, and it's simply 350 pages too many. Moore ... delivers his material with no passion and, worse, with an utter lack of respect for his subjects.

Marcus Berkmann wished there had been "ruthless editing", adding "[l]ose 80 to 100 pages and this would have been a classic"; but despite its length, wrote that this was "a fascinating study of failure and how different people cope with it", and a book of "underlying seriousness", "a significant addition to Eurovision studies and a sometimes blisteringly funny account of surprisingly sad lives".

== Editions ==
Nul Points:

- London: Jonathan Cape, 2006. ISBN 0-224-07780-5.
- London: Vintage, 2007. ISBN 978-0-099-49297-9.

The 2007 Vintage edition has neither a contents list nor an index. It does have eight pages of photographs of the singers; these appear to be ESC screenshots.

A German translation – Null Punkte. Ein bisschen Scheitern beim Eurovision Song Contest – has also been published.

== Works cited ==
- Moore, Tim (2007). Nul Points. London: Vintage. ISBN 978-0-099-49297-9.
