= Letters from High Latitudes =

1856 travel book by Lord Dufferin

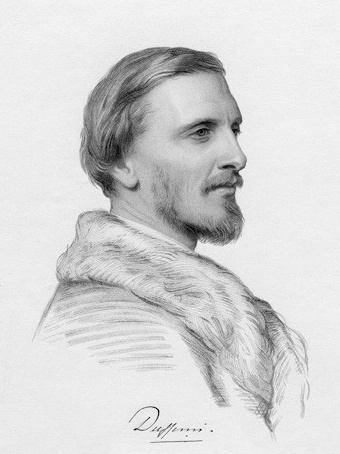
Lord Dufferin as a young man

Letters From High Latitudes is a travel book written by Lord Dufferin in 1856, recounting the young lord's journey to Iceland, Jan Mayen and Spitzbergen in the schooner Foam.

When Dufferin was only 15 his father died. In consequence he developed a very close relationship with his mother. In the course of the voyage Dufferin created a diary in the form of letters nominally written to his mother. On his return, Lord Dufferin used those letters to write a book about his travels entitled Letters From High Latitudes.

Lord Dufferin commissioned the schooner Foam with the first objective of visiting Iceland. He visited the then-minuscule Reykjavík, the plains of Þingvellir, and Geysir. While Dufferin was at Geysir Prince Napoleon arrived on the yacht Reine Hortense with his entourage. Upon his return to Reykjavík Dufferin was invited to join Prince Napoleon aboard his royal steamer La Reine Hortense. Prince Napoleon offered that the Foam be towed north as the French were on an expedition to the same region. The collier traveling with La Reine Hortense was damaged which required the French to abandon their investigations. Dufferin then set sail for Jan Mayen Island where he had to land by small boat. He wrote that he left a tin of trinkets on the island. From Jan Mayen, the Foam sailed to northern Norway, stopping at Hammerfest, before sailing for Spitzbergen.

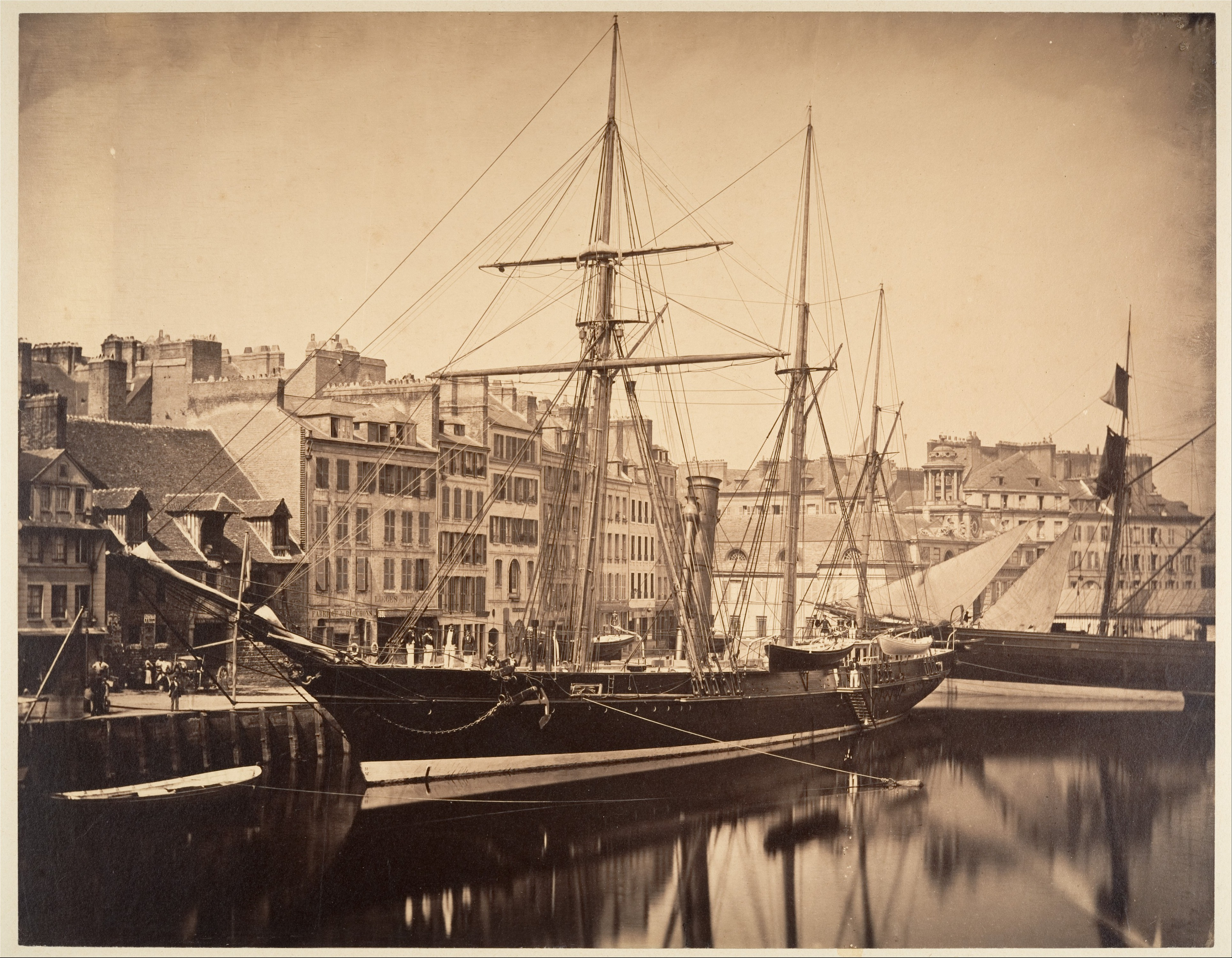
La Reine Hortense which afforded Dufferin assistance

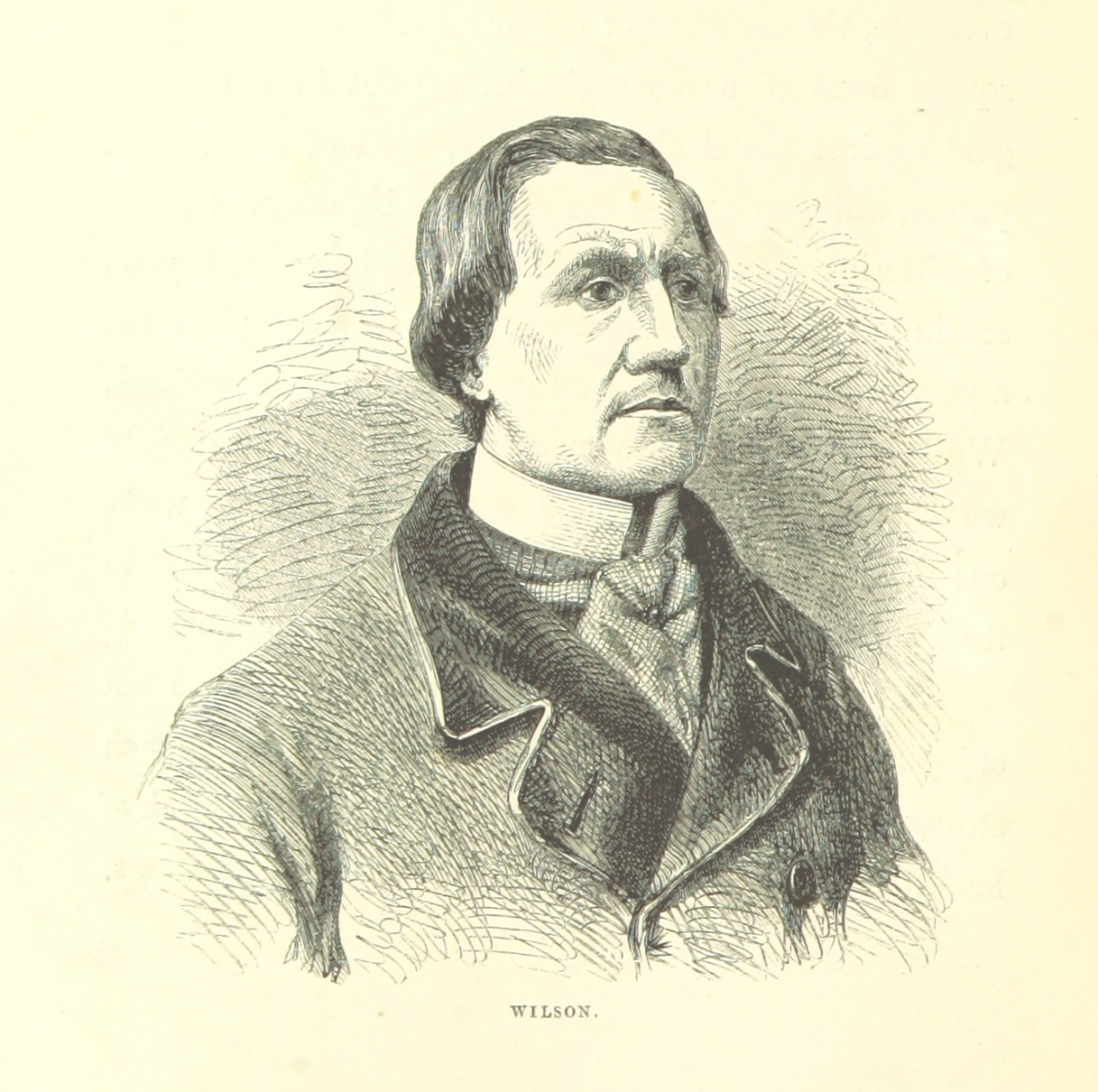
William Wilson - Valet, Gardener, Cape Colonist

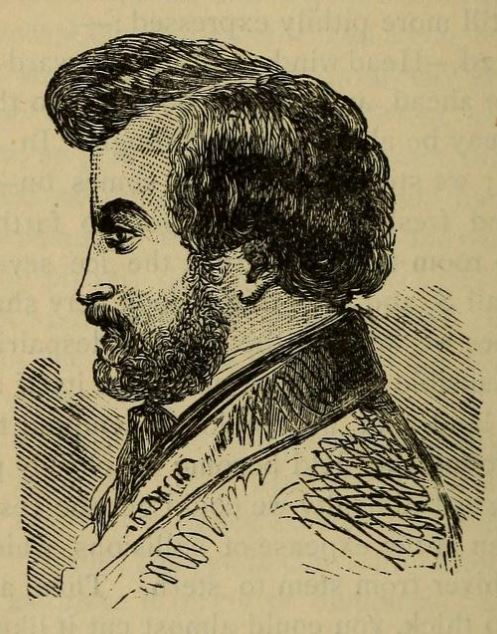
Sigurdr, son of Jonas an Icelander

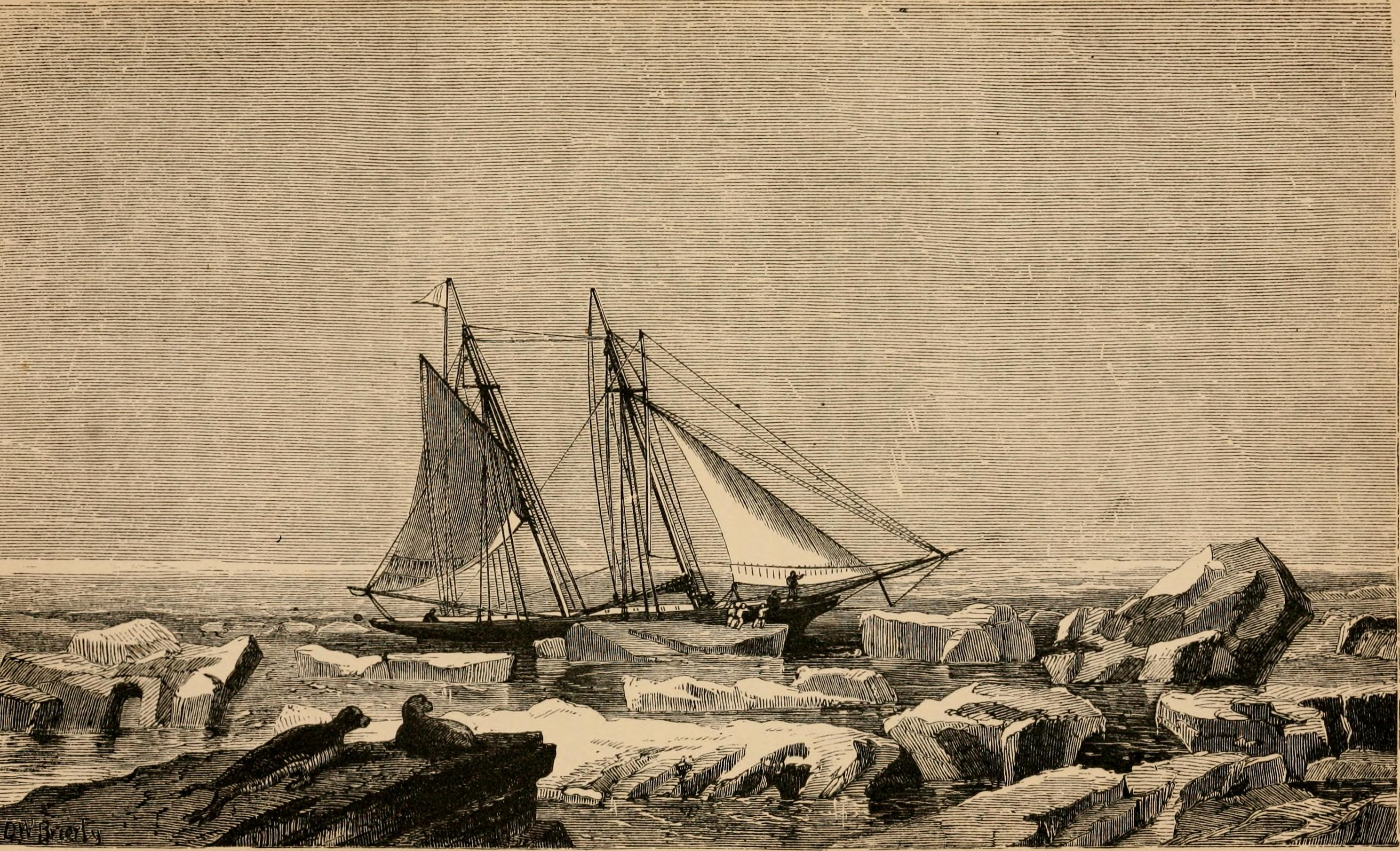
The schooner yacht "Foam"

With its irreverent style, lively pace, and witty commentary, the book became extremely successful. It can be regarded as the prototype of the comic travelogue. It remained in print for many years with editions published in both the United Kingdom and the United States. A Canadian edition was published while Dufferin was Governor General of Canada. An abridged edition was published under the title A Cruise in Northern Seas. Translations were made into French, German and Urdu.

Despite his book's great success Lord Dufferin did not pursue a career in writing. Instead, he became a diplomat, later serving as British ambassador to Russia and the Ottoman Empire. Subsequently, he was appointed Governor General of Canada and after that term became Viceroy of India.

Frost on My Moustache by Tim Moore is an account of a journey in which the author attempts to emulate Lord Dufferin's fearless spirit and enthusiastic adventuring, but comes to identify far more with Dufferin's permanently miserable butler, Wilson.

== Publication history ==
Editions of Letters from High Latitudes include:

- John Murray, London, 1857 (1st edition half-leather)
- John Murray, London, 1857 (2nd edition)
- John Murray, London, 1857 (3rd edition)
- John Murray, London, 1858 (4th edition)
- Ticknor and Fields, Boston, 1859 (1st edition)
- R. Worthington, New York, 1878 (3rd edition)
- Adam, Stevenson & Co., Toronto, 1872 (1st Canadian edition)
- John Murray, London, 1873 (6th edition)
- Lovell, Adam, Wesson. & Company, New York, 1873
- Lovell, Adam, Wesson & Company, New York, 1878 (edition contains a Preface to the Third edition, as well as preface to Canadian edition)
- R. Worthington, New York, 1882
- John Murray, London, 1883 (7th edition)
- John Murray, London, 1887 (8th edition)
- John Murray, London, 1891 (9th edition)
- Bernhard Tauchnitz, Leipzig, 1891
- Wm. L. Allison Company, New York, 1895
- John Murray, London, 1895 (10th edition)
- John Murray, London, 1902 (11th edition)
- John Murray, London, 1903 (Canadian edition)
- J.M. Dent & Sons, Ltd., London, 1910
- John Murray, London, 1913 (Canadian edition; reprint)
- Humphrey Milford Oxford University Press, Oxford, 1924. Introduction by R.W. Macan
- Dent, London, 1925. Everyman's Library Volume 399
- Oxford University Press, Oxford, 1934 (The World's Classics)
- J. M. Dent & Sons Ltd., London, 1940
- The Merlin Press, London. 1989 (paperback reprint of Canadian edition)
- Seafarer Books, 1991 (paperback facsimile of 1856 edition)
- Kessinger Publishing, 2004 (paperback)
- Lightning Source Inc, 2006

Edition of A Cruise in Northern Seas

- Henry Frowde, London 1920
