= French yacht Reine Hortense (1853) =

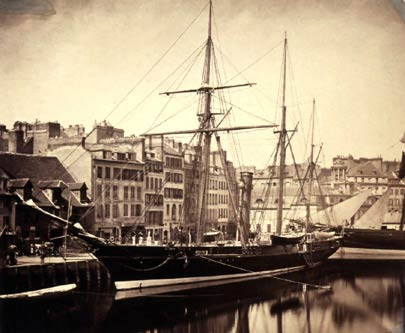
- Photograph of the imperial yacht Reine Hortense in 1856, by Gustave Le Gray

History

France
- Name: Cassard
- Namesake: Jacques Cassard
- Builder: Le Havre
- Laid down: September 1844
- Launched: 20 December 1846
- Out of service: 8 April 1882
- Fate: Broken up 1920

General characteristics
- Displacement: 1100 tonnes
- Length: 62 metres
- Beam: 10.8 metres
- Draught: 5.7 metres
- Propulsion: 1280 HP steam engine
- Armour: Iron

Reine Hortense was the imperial Yacht from 1853.

== Career ==
Laid down as Comte d'Eu, the ship was renamed to Patriote on 20 February 1848 after the French Revolution of 1848. In June 1853, she became the imperial yacht Reine Hortense.

In 1855, she served as a troopship to ferry forces bound for the theatre of the Crimean War.

Reine Hortense ferried Prince Napoléon Bonaparte from Marseille to Genoa in early 1859 for his marriage to Princess Maria Clotilde of Savoy, and Napoléon III from Marseille to Genoa on 11 and 12 May 1859. Returned to the French Navy in 1854.

In 1862 she was in the Baltic when she gave aid to a British vessel who she towed her 80 miles from Bomarsund to Stockholm, on board had been Lord Dufferin, who she was to meet again 3 years later.

The Reine Hortense was recommissioned as the imperial yacht on 20 April 1865 for an official visit in Algeria.

In June 1856 she took Prince Napoléon on an expedition to Greenland, with the Artémise (1847), a 28-gun corvette, La Perdrix and, the "cocyte", and two British coal tender screw steamers, the "Tasmania" and the "Saxon" of 700 tons each. On 30 June at Reykjavík in Iceland, she met again Lord Dufferin who was on his own travels that would feature in his book Letters From High Latitudes, published the next year. Dufferin's journey was taking in Iceland, Jan Mayen and Spitzbergen. He had chartered the schooner Foam for the task. Dufferin was invited to join Prince Napoleon aboard his royal steamer, and the Prince on hearing that the "Foam" had broken down offered them a tow north to Jan Mayen as they were going to the same region. On their last night in Reykjavík the prince held a ball to which all the rank, fashion, and beauty of the tiny town (population 700 or 800) were invited. The "Foam" was attached with two cables and the flotilla set off on 7 July, the collier "Saxon" traveling all too slowly behind.

The fragile La Reine Hortense was soon to be in increasing danger from the ice and the French were required to abandon their journey 100 miles short of Jam Mayen, and return to Reykjavík. So on 11 July they let loose the "Foam" to carry on north by sail. This was fortunate in a sense since on their return they were to discover that the Saxon had been damaged by ice, and would have meant that the convoy would have been short of fuel. This effectively cancelled the expedition.

Reine Hortense was again decommissioned in October.

On 14 February 1867, she was renamed to Cassard, and commissioned for the Algiers station. In her military role, her performances inspired a whole generation of commerce raiding cruisers; these ships, inexpensive, unarmoured sail and steam corvettes or frigates with a relatively heavy armament, proved useful to enact gunship diplomacy around the world, but became obsolete after the Franco-Prussian War.

Cassard served there until 1881, when she was decommissioned in Toulon before becoming a littoral defence ship.

Renamed to Faune in 1893, she was used as a hulk in Port-Vendre. She was eventually broken up in 1920.
