= Vine Street Police Station =

Police station in London, England

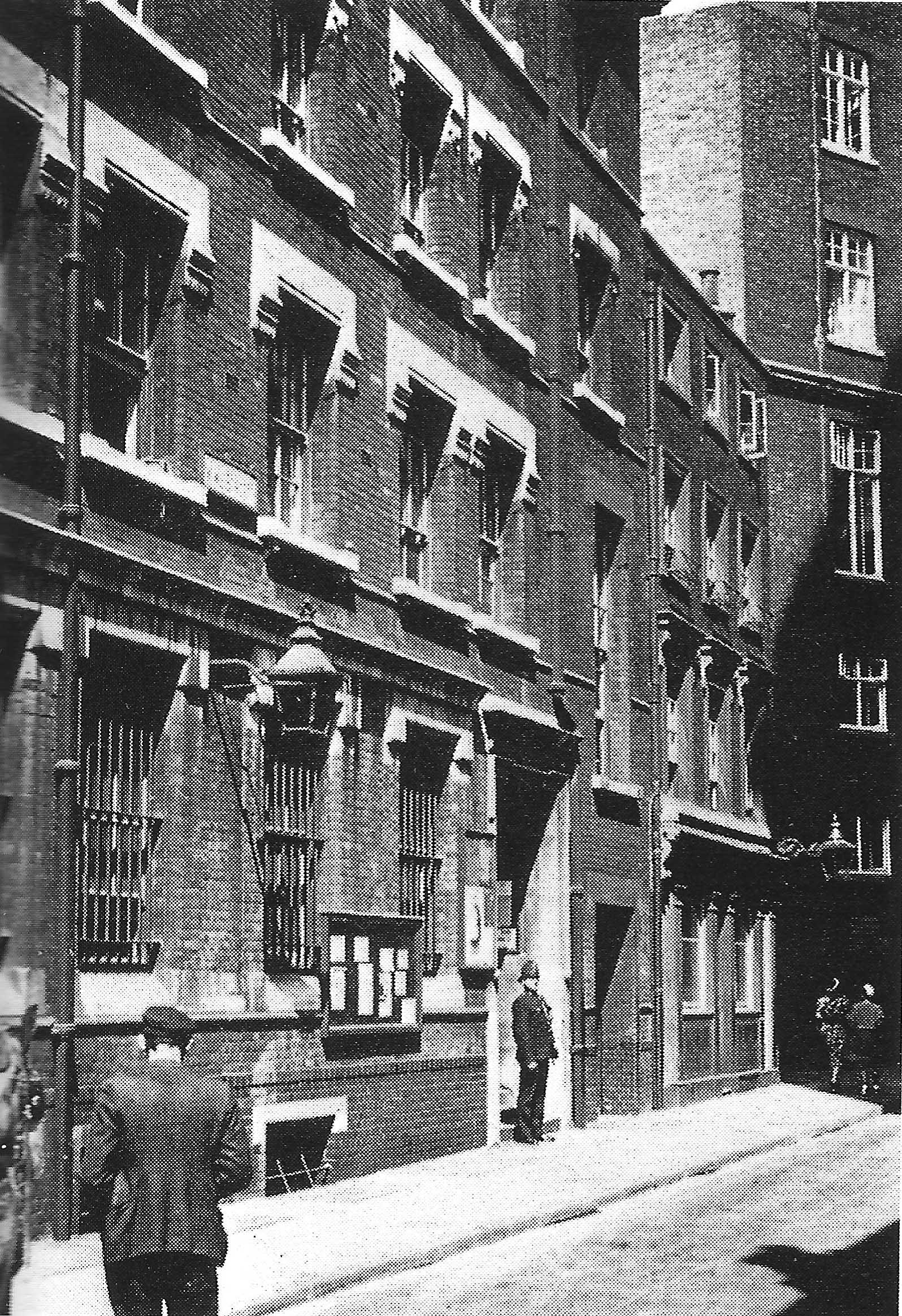
Vine Street Police Station (now closed)

Vine Street Police Station was a Metropolitan Police station at No. 10 Vine Street in central London.

== History ==
It was originally built as a watch-house around 1767, and rebuilt following a fire in 1786 that destroyed several properties on and around the street. A school operated on the first floor, and two cells were in the basement. A further storey was added to the building in 1816.

In 1829 the building was renamed Vine Street Police Station and handed over to the new force following the establishment of the Metropolitan Police District. The school moved from the building to Swallow Street in 1836, where it stayed until closing in 1881. The police station went on to become one of the main stations in Central London. In 1850, it was extended over the 18th century courthouses. At one point in the 19th century it was one of the busiest police stations in the world.

In 1895, the Marquess of Queensberry was charged at Vine Street Police Station with libel against Oscar Wilde. This ultimately led to Wilde's arrest and subsequent imprisonment. An Arts and Crafts extension wing was built on the station in 1897, that faced onto Swallow Street. On 29 May 1901, the stonemason James Schulty reported he had information about the murder of Mary Ann Austin but refused to reveal details anywhere except the Vine Street Police Station. (Note: As Austin had lived in 35 Dorset Street in the East End of London, rumours spread that the murder was a revival of the notorious Whitechapel murders of 1888–91. One of the victims, Annie Chapman, thought to have been murdered by Jack the Ripper, had lived at that address.) The information was discarded by the Metropolitan Police as of little value.

In 1928, an officer working at the station was sacked after it was revealed he had been gathering bribes from local nightclubs and brothels, acquiring over £17,000 (now £1,294,000) in the process. The officer subsequently committed suicide and the station was said to be haunted by his ghost. Related incidents include reports of papers being inexplicably moved, and an officer hearing footsteps despite knowing he was the only one in the station.

The Man in the Moon pub, adjacent to the station, was bought by the Receiver in 1931. The station closed in 1940 (along with nearby Marlborough Street Magistrates Court) to be replaced with an integrated West End Central Police Station at Savile Row, with the street being renamed Piccadilly Place. A subsequent rise in foot traffic around the area, and associated crime, led to the station being re-opened in 1966, with the street being renamed back to Vine Street in 1972. The police station closed in 1997 and the building was demolished in 2005 for redevelopment.

== Popular Culture ==
DC Alfred "Tosh" Lines form The Bill had been based at Vine Street Police Station sometime prior to his transfer to Sun Hill
