= John Sandford (poet) =

English clergyman and academic

John Sandford or Sanford (c. 1565 – 1629) was an English clergyman and academic, known as a grammarian of the Romance languages. He was also a Neo-Latin poet, and a founder of the tradition of literary nonsense under the pseudonym Glareanus Vadianus, a mocker of Thomas Coryat.

== Life ==
Son of Richard Sandford, of Chard, Somerset, he was born there about 1565. He entered Balliol College, Oxford, as a commoner about 16 October 1581, and graduated B.A. from Balliol on 17 December 1586, M.A. on 27 May 1595. He was chosen in 1593 chaplain of Magdalen College, but more than once was censured for absenting himself from public worship. Sandford retained the office of chaplain at Magdalen until 1616; but before that date he commenced travelling as chaplain to Sir John Digby. About 1610 Sandford was in Brussels, and on 20 March 1611 they started for Spain, Digby's mission being the Spanish Match.

In 1614 Sandford was at Lambeth Palace, acting as domestic chaplain to George Abbot, archbishop of Canterbury. Abbot in 1615 presented him to a prebend in Canterbury Cathedral, and to the rectories of Ivechurch in Romney Marsh, and Blackmanstone, also in Kent. On 27 October 1621 he was presented to Snave in the same county, which he held until his death on 24 September 1629. He was buried in Canterbury Cathedral.

== Works ==
He obtained a reputation as a writer of Latin verse; John Lane reckoned him on a level with Samuel Daniel, describing them jointly as the "two swans" of Somerset, and John Davies of Hereford eulogised him in a sonnet. Sandford's earliest publication, 'Appolinis et Mvsarum Eὐκτικὰ Eἰδύλλια in Serenissimae Reginae Elizabethae ... adventum,' Oxford, 1592, describes in Latin verse the banquet given by the president and fellows of Magdalen to Queen Elizabeth's retinue on the occasion of her visit to Oxford on 22 September 1592. Other verses by Sandford are In obitum clar. Herois Domini Arthuri Greij,'in a funeral sermon by Thomas Sparke, 1593; In Funebria nob. et praest. equitis D. Henrici Vnton,' 1596, in Academiae Oxoniensis funebre officium in mort. Eliz. Reginae, Oxford, 1603; and commendatory poems in Latin before John Davies's Microcosmos, 1603, Thomas Winter's translation of Du Bartas, pts. i. and ii. (1603), and Thomas Godwin's Romanae Historiae Anthologia, 1614.

Sandford also published on his own account at Oxford God's Arrow of the Pestilence, a sermon never preached (1604), and grammars of French, Latin, and Italian, to which he afterwards added one of Spanish. The first three were entitled respectively, Le Guichet Francois, sive Janicvla et Brevis Introductio ad Linguam Gallicam, Oxford, 1604; A briefe extract of the former Latin Grammar, done into English for the easier instruction of the Learner, Oxford, 1605, (dedicated to William, son of Arthur, lord Grey de Wilton); A Grammar, or Introdvction to the Italian Tongue, Oxford, 1605, containing a poem, Sur l'Autheur, by Jean More. e prepared 'Προπύλαιον, or Entrance to the Spanish Tongue ' (London, 1611; 2nd edit. 1633), for the use of ambassador Digby's party. It was dedicated to William Langton, President of Magdalen, and among the embassy using it was James Mabbe.
