= Bartolomeo Barbarino =

Italian composer and singer

Bartolomeo Barbarino (known as "il Pesarino") (c. 1568–c. 1617 or later) was an Italian composer and singer of the early Baroque era. He was a virtuoso falsettist, and one of the most enthusiastic composers of the new style of monody.

== Life ==
Nothing is known about his early life; his birthdate is inferred from the description by an English visitor in 1608 who described him as being "about forty." The first record concerning him is from 1593, when he was employed as an alto in Loreto at Santa Casa. Until 1602 he was in Urbino, where he served both Monsignor Giuliano della Rovere and the Duke of Urbino. From 1602 to 1605 he worked as organist at Pesaro Cathedral, and afterwards worked in Padua for the Bishop of Padua. In 1608 he went to Venice to take part in the Festival of San Rocco. Evidently his fame as a singer was widespread at this time, as he was one of the most distinguished visitors.

An English visitor to Venice, Thomas Coryat, left this description of his singing (Coryats Crudities, London, 1611):

"Of the singers there were three or foure so excellent that I thinke few or none in Christendome do exell them, especially one, who had such a peerelesse and ... supernaturall voice for sweetnesse, that I thinke there was never a better singer in the world ... I alwaies thought that he was an Eunuch, which if he had beene, it had taken away some part of my admiration, because they do most commonly sing passing wel; but he was not, therefore it was much the more admirable."

In the preface to one of his books of motets, Barbarino wrote that he would sing his works to the accompaniment of the chitarrone, "for my voice is hoarse and frail."

== Works ==
Almost all of Barbarino's music is in the monodic style, using a single virtuoso solo voice part accompanied by basso continuo. Unusually for the time, he often indicated the instruments which were best to use as accompaniment, including chitarrone, theorbo, and harpsichord. His last collection of works, a book of madrigals dated to 1617, is for three voices, but also accompanied by basso continuo.

Barbarino published two books of motets, both in Venice, as well as thirteen separate sacred pieces; additionally he published five books of madrigals and one book of canzonette, for a total of over 150 pieces. He often published two separate versions of the solo voice part for each work: one heavily ornamented and extremely difficult to sing (most likely he sang this version himself); and a simplified version intended for a less accomplished singer.

== Sources ==
- Article "Bartolomeo Barbarino," in The New Grove Dictionary of Music and Musicians, ed. Stanley Sadie. 20 vol. London, Macmillan Publishers Ltd., 1980. ISBN 1-56159-174-2
- CD notes for disk Music for San Rocco, by Paul McCreesh (Gabrieli Consort and Players, directed by Paul McCreesh)

== Recordings ==
- Music for San Rocco (Gabrieli Consort and Players, directed by Paul McCreesh). Archiv: Deutsche Grammophon GmbH, Hamburg, 1996. (Mostly contains music by Giovanni Gabrieli, although it includes two monodies by Barbarino)

"La Musica Per San Rocco"(Melodi Cantores & La Pifarescha conducted by Elena Sartori).ARTS MUSIC LC2513 (SACD)

== Bibliography ==
- B. Barbarino [Barberino] da Fabriano detto Il Pesarino, Ave Maria per Soprano (o Tenore) e Organo. Prefazione, realizzazione del basso continuo e revisione di M. Genesi, Piacenza, P.I.R., 2004, pp. 12.
