= Vine Street, London =

Street in City of Westminster, England

Coordinates: 51°30′34″N 0°08′14″W

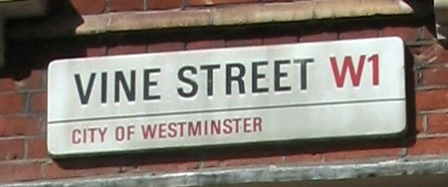
Sign at the western end of Vine Street

Vine Street is a street in Westminster, London, running from Swallow Street, parallel to Regent Street and Piccadilly. It is now a dead end that was shortened from a longer road in the early 18th century owing to the building of Regent Street.

From the 18th to 20th century, it was home to Vine Street watchhouse (later Police Station), which grew into one of the busiest police stations in the world. The Marquess of Queensberry was charged with libel against Oscar Wilde here in 1895. There was also a court house on the street in the 18th and early 19th century. The street's association with law has led to it being grouped with Bow Street and Marlborough Street on the standard British Monopoly board.

== Geography ==
The street is approximately 70 feet (21 m) long and is a dead end, running east and parallel to Piccadilly near Piccadilly Circus. It consists mainly of the rear facades of buildings facing onto other streets. It connects to Swallow Street at its western end and an alleyway, Piccadilly Place halfway along. At the eastern end, the Man in the Moon Passage provides foot access to Regent Street. The nearest tube station is Piccadilly Circus.

== History ==
The street is named after The Vine, an 18th-century public house, which in turn may have been named after a vineyard that existed at this location in Roman times. It was documented on ratebooks as Little Swallow Street in 1675. It was laid out around 1686 and originally ran further, along what is now the Man in the Moon Passage. John Rocque's Map of London, 1746 shows Vine Street extending from Piccadilly northeast to Warwick Street. In 1720, the main properties on the street were a brewery and a carpenter's yard. Around 1751–52, a court house was built at the western end of the street, on the corner of what is now Piccadilly Place. It closed in 1836 following the reorganisation of the court system around Westminster and was subsequently occupied by the lawyer Edward Gaffin. The following century the street gained a famous Met Police Station.

Vine Street was split into two sections following the construction of Regent Street between 1816 and 1819. The Man in the Moon Passage was created at this time, named after a former pub at this location. The northern section towards Warwick Street was renamed Great Vine Street, and then a branch of Warwick Street itself. It ceased to exist after the reconstruction of the Regent Street Quadrant in 1920.

In 1853, Charles Moreign purchased several small houses at the end of Vine Street so they could be redeveloped into St James's Hall, Piccadilly. A rear entrance to the hall backed onto the street. The hall was demolished in 1905 and replaced by the Piccadilly Hotel, which also backs onto Vine Street.

== Events and incidents ==
The Dutch artist Peter Scheemakers moved into a house on the western edge of Vine Street around 1741. He stayed there until 1769, when he returned to Antwerp.

On 2 September 1791, composer Frantisek Kotzwara died at prostitute Susannah Hill's house at No. 5 Vine Street from erotic asphyxiation following a sexual act that involved tying his neck to a doorknob. Hill was charged with Kotzwara's murder but later acquitted.

The street and police station are mentioned in the Pogues' song "The Old Main Drag" on their 1985 album Rum Sodomy & the Lash. It refers to the station and street's unpopularity with some of London owing to their distrust of the police force. Because of its relatively hidden location and proximity to Piccadilly Circus, the street suffers from crime, which has led to Westminster City Council gating off the Man in the Moon Passage so service vehicles can access connecting buildings safely.

The street features as a property with a purchase price of £200 on the British Monopoly board. It is one of a group of three, coded orange, with connections to law, and is named after the police station. The other two orange properties, Bow Street and Marlborough Street, which are both valued at £180, are named after the Bow Street Runners and Marlborough Street Magistrates Court respectively. Since the Man in the Moon is now closed, students on a Monopoly board pub crawl drink in one of the nearby pubs, such as those on Swallow Street, instead.
