= Odcombe =

Village and civil parish in Somerset, England

Coordinates: 50.936°N 2.705°W

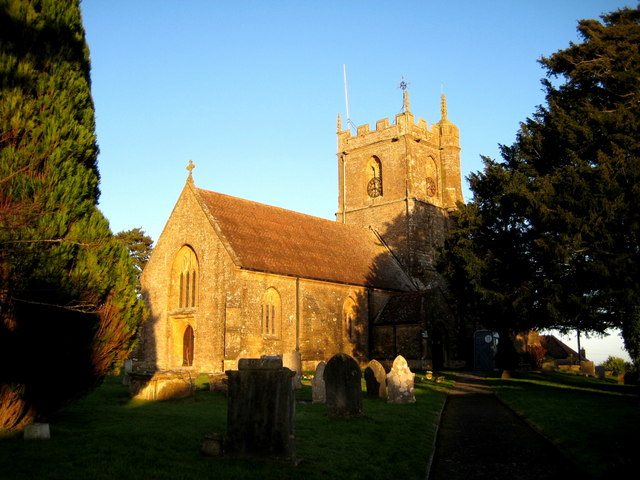
- Church of St Peter and St Paul

- Location within Somerset
- Population: 759 (2011)
- OS grid reference: ST505155
- Unitary authority: Somerset Council
- Ceremonial county: Somerset
- Region: South West
- Country: England
- Sovereign state: United Kingdom
- Post town: YEOVIL
- Postcode district: BA22
- Dialling code: 01935
- Police: Avon and Somerset
- Fire: Devon and Somerset
- Ambulance: South Western
- UK Parliament: Yeovil

Odcombe is a village and civil parish in south Somerset, England, 3 miles (4.8 km) west of the town of Yeovil, with a population of 759 in 2011.

The upper part of the village, Higher Odcombe, sits on the crest of the hill, while the lower part, Lower Odcombe, is built on its northern slopes.

== History ==
The village is mentioned in the Domesday Book when it was owned by Robert, Count of Mortain. After the Battle of Hastings in 1066, the Barony of Odcombe was given to Ansgar de Brito (formerly Ansgar de Montacute/Ansgar Deincourt) for valor in battle. Along with the Odcombe Barony, Ansgar de Brito acquired multiple additional holdings within Somersetshire, at which point the Count of Mortain became his overlord.

In the 1860s, the village church was redeveloped, during which time the preserved shoes of Thomas Coryat were lost. The village is built predominantly out of the local hamstone still quarried on Ham Hill, two miles to the west.

The parish was part of the hundred of Houndsborough.

== Religious sites ==
The Ham stone Church of St Peter and St Paul has 13th-century origins. In 1874, transepts were added and the church restored. It has been designated as a Grade I listed building. A headstone in yellow Jaisalmer stone lies embedded in the front lawn of the church to mark a memorial service to poet Dom Moraes (1938–2004).

== Governance ==
The parish council has responsibility for local issues, including setting an annual precept (local rate) to cover the council's operating costs and producing annual accounts for public scrutiny. The parish council evaluates local planning applications and works with the local police, district council officers, and neighbourhood watch groups on matters of crime, security, and traffic. The parish council's role also includes initiating projects for the maintenance and repair of parish facilities, as well as consulting with the district council on the maintenance, repair, and improvement of highways, drainage, footpaths, public transport, and street cleaning. Conservation matters (including trees and listed buildings) and environmental issues are also the responsibility of the council.

For local government purposes, since 1 April 2023, the parish comes under the unitary authority of Somerset Council. Prior to this, it was part of the non-metropolitan district of South Somerset (established under the Local Government Act 1972). It was part of Yeovil Rural District before 1974.

It is also part of the Yeovil county constituency represented in the House of Commons of the Parliament of the United Kingdom. It elects one member of parliament by the first past the post system of election.

== Notable people ==
- Humphrey Hody (1658–1707), theologian
- George Strong (1833–1888), soldier
- Hilda Mary Hooke (1898–1978), author
- Thomas Coryat (c. 1577–1617), traveller and writer
