= Thomas Coryat =

English traveller and writer

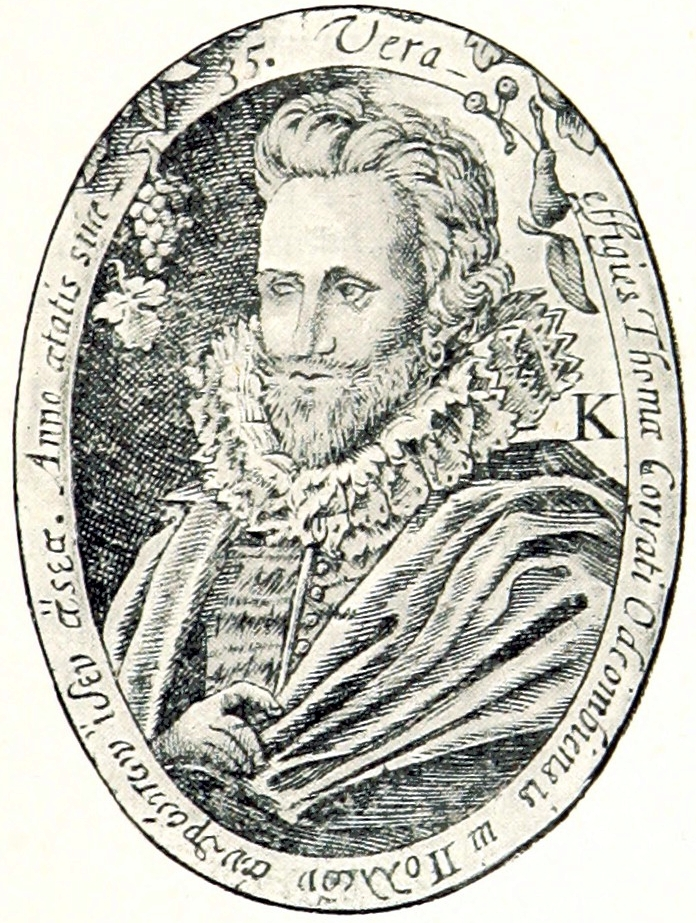
- Born: c. 1577; Crewkerne, Somerset, England
- Died: 1617 (aged 39–40)
- Burial place: Rajgari near Suvali, India (uncertain)
- Other name: Thomas Coryate
- Occupations: traveller and writer
- Known for: introducing words into English
- Notable work: the words "fork" and "umbrella"
- Father: George Coryate

Thomas Coryat (also Coryate) (c. 1577 – 1617) was an English traveller and writer of the late Elizabethan and early Jacobean age. He is principally remembered for two volumes of writings he left regarding his travels, often on foot, through Europe and parts of Asia. He is often credited with introducing the table fork to England, with "Furcifer" (Latin: fork-bearer, rascal) becoming one of his nicknames. His description of how the Italians shielded themselves from the sun resulted in the word "umbrella" being introduced into English.

== Life and writings ==
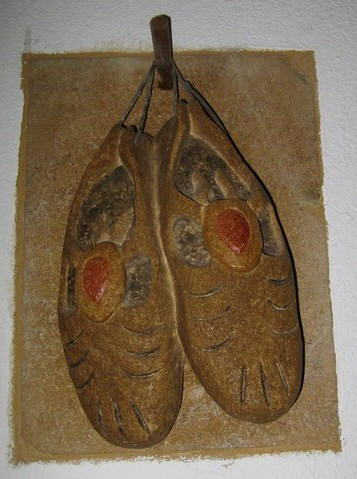
Replica of Thomas Coryat's shoes in the Church of St Peter and St Paul, Odcombe, Somerset.

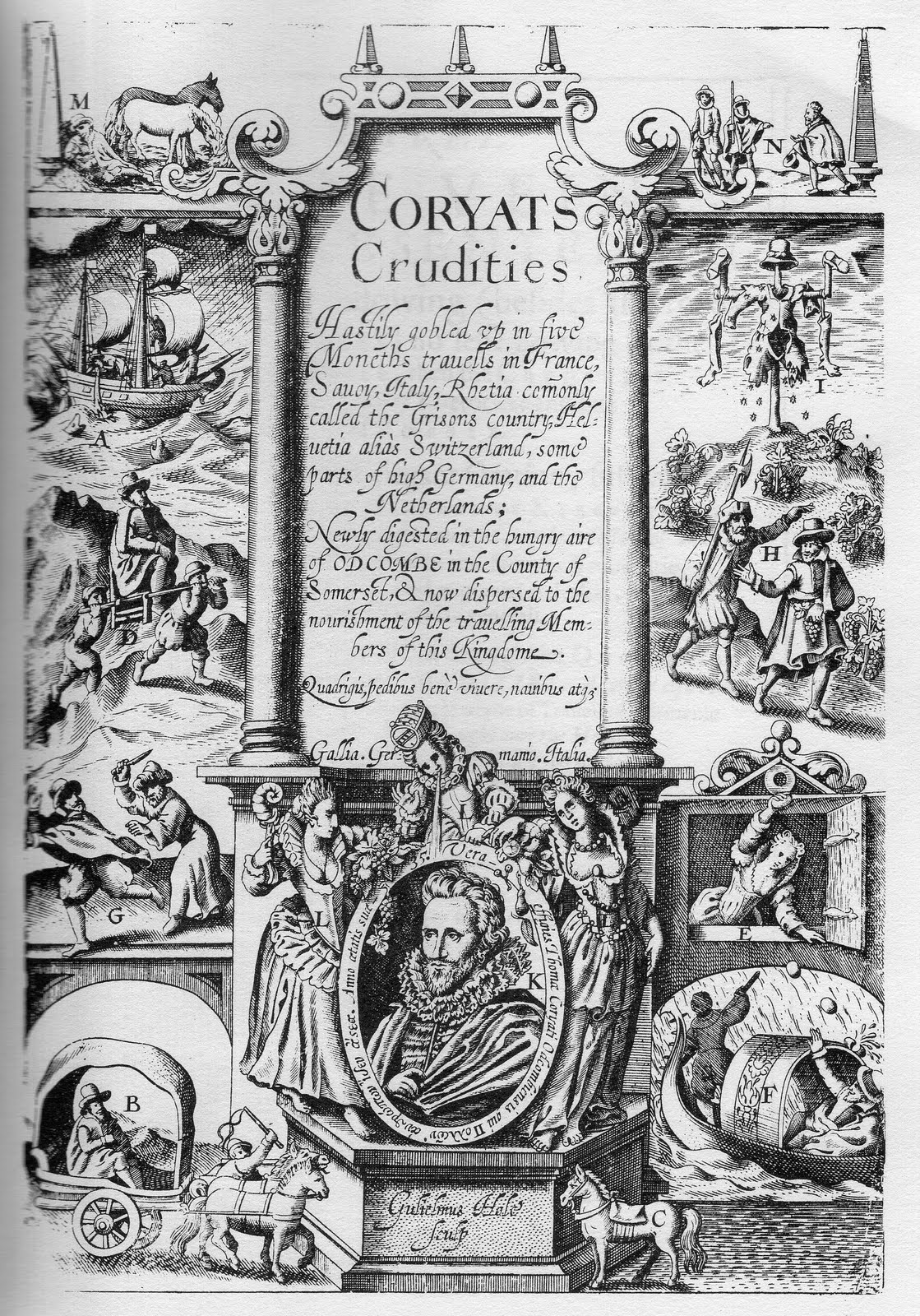
Title page of Coryat's Crudities, 1611.

Coryat was born in Crewkerne, Somerset, and lived most of his life in the Somerset village of Odcombe. He was a son of George Coryate (died 1607). He was educated at Winchester College from 1591, and at Gloucester Hall, Oxford from 1596 to 1599. He was employed by Prince Henry, eldest son of James I as a sort of "court jester" from 1603 to 1607, alongside Ben Jonson, John Donne and Inigo Jones.

From May to October 1608 he undertook a tour of Europe, somewhat less than half of which he walked. He travelled through France and Italy to Venice, and returned via Switzerland, Germany and the Netherlands. He published his memoirs of the events in a volume entitled Coryat's Crudities hastily gobbled up in Five Months Travels in France, Italy, &c (1611). This volume gives a vivid picture of life in Europe during the time.

The work is particularly important to music historians for giving extraordinary details of the activities of the Venetian School, one of the most famous and progressive contemporary musical movements in Europe, including an elaborate description of the festivities at the church of San Rocco in Venice, with polychoral and instrumental music by Giovanni Gabrieli, Bartolomeo Barbarino, and others. In 1611 he published a second volume of travel writings, this one entitled Coryats Crambe, or his Coleworte twice Sodden. Coryat's letters from this time refer to the famous Mermaid Tavern in London, and mention Ben Jonson, John Donne and other members of a drinking club named the "Fraternity of Sireniacal Gentlemen" that met there.

Ever restless, he set out once again in 1612, this time on a journey that would ultimately lead to Asia, visiting Greece, the eastern Mediterranean including Constantinople by 1614, and walking through Turkey, Persia and eventually Moghul India by 1615, visiting the Emperor Jahangir's court in Ajmer, Rajasthan. From Agra and elsewhere he sent letters describing his experiences; his Greetings from the Court of the Great Mogul was published in London in 1616, and a similar volume of his letters home appeared posthumously in 1618. In September 1617, at the invitation of Sir Thomas Roe, he visited the imperial court at Mandu, Madhya Pradesh. In November 1617 he left for Surat; he died of dysentery there in December of that year, his demise hastened by the consumption of sack. Though his planned account of the journey was never to be, some of his unorganized travel notes have survived and found their way back to England. These were published in the 1625 edition of Samuel Purchas's Hakluytus Posthumus or Purchas his Pilgrimes, contayning a History of the World in Sea Voyages and Lande Travells, by Englishmen and others.

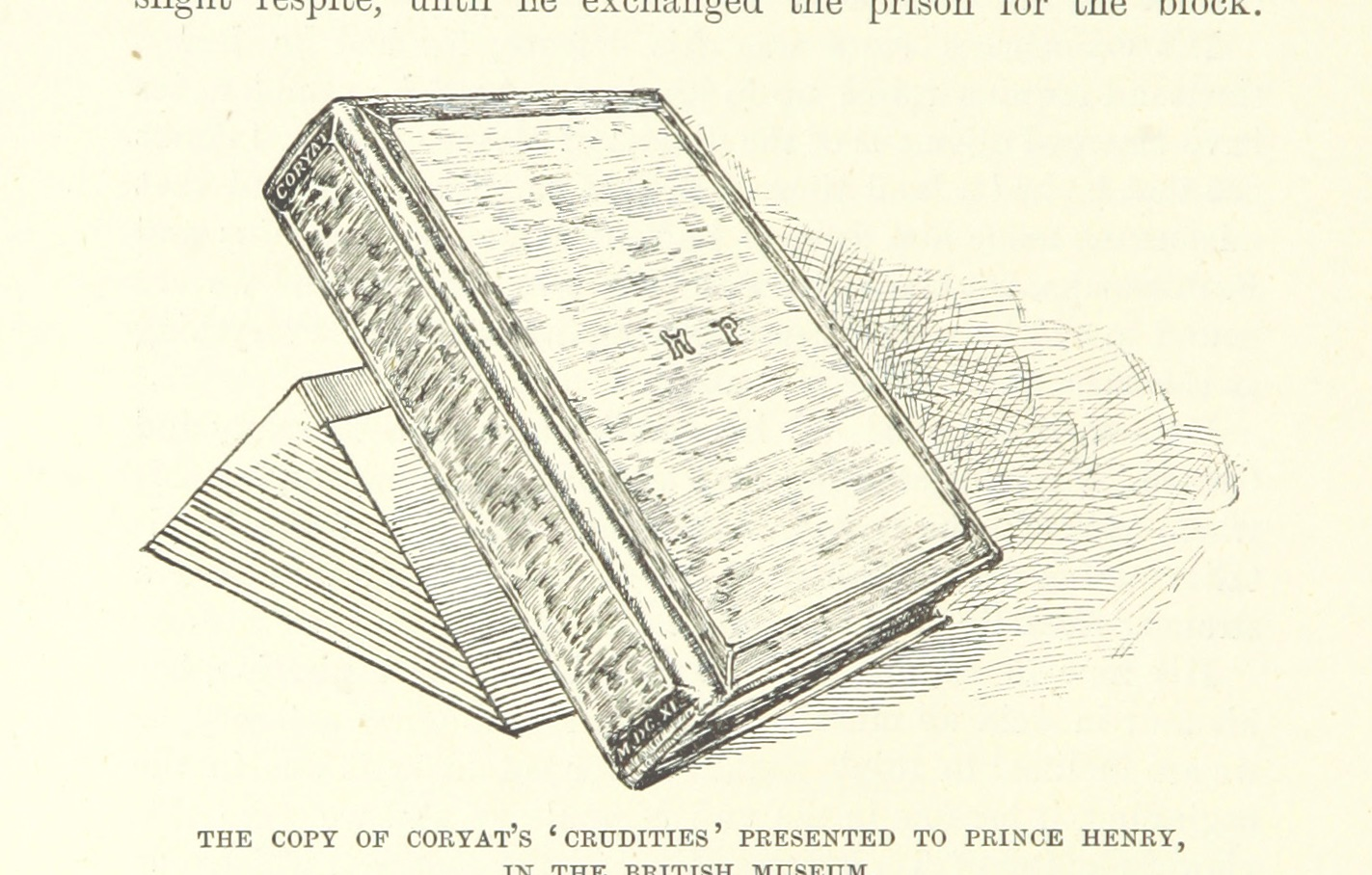
His books in British museum

Coryat's writings were hugely popular at the time. His accounts of inscriptions, many of which are now lost, were valuable; and his accounts of Italian customs and manners—including the use of the table fork—were influential in England at a time when other aspects of Italian culture, such as the madrigal, had already been in vogue for more than twenty years. He is considered by many to have been the first Briton to do a Grand Tour of Europe; a practice which became a mainstay of the education of upper class Englishmen in the 18th century.

== Tomb ==
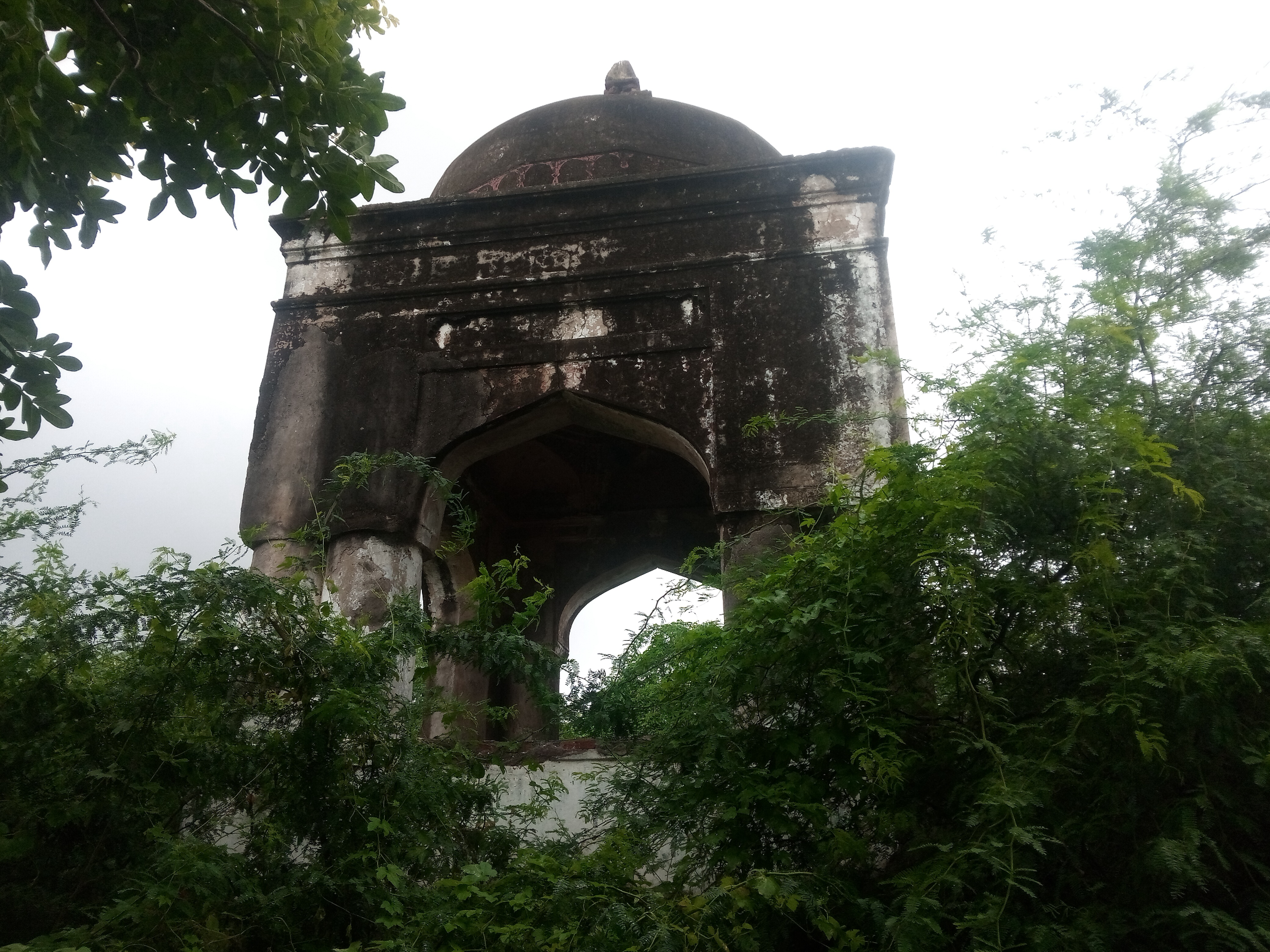
Thomas Coryat's purported tomb at Suvali beach

The place of his tomb is uncertain. As there was no regular English cemetery at Surat then, his body was buried north of the town on the western side of road leading to Bharuch. Another traveller, Terry, noted that his body was buried at Swally (Suvali), where other English people are also buried, but this account is not reliable, for it was written 40 years after the death of Coryat. The List of Tombs and Monuments in the Bombay Presidency had described it as 'consisting of a dome resting on circular pillars' in Muslim architectural style, which is similar to a monument present at Rajgari near Suvali. This monument is now State Protected Monument identifying it as the tomb of Tom Coryat (S-GJ-231). There is no inscription or other clue supporting it as the tomb; however, it is known that the tomb had just two marked stones originally and there is no known reason why a monument was erected later. Thomas Herbert, who visited India ten years after the death of Coryat, noted that a Persian ambassador, who died on board the fleet at Swally, was buried near him in Surat. Dr. John Fryer who was at Surat in 1675 was shown the tombs of the Persian ambassador and Coryat, along with several Armenian Christian tombs outside the Bharuch gate. The original location of the gate is not known, as the old mud wall fort was replaced by a brick wall fort after the Battle of Surat. During the British period, William Morrison, the collector of Surat, tried to find the tomb and later concluded that it is lost in the periodical floods of the Tapi river.

== Legacy ==
British travel writer and historian William Dalrymple cites Coryat as 'one of my travel-writing heroes' in his first book, In Xanadu (1989).

British travel writer and humorist Tim Moore retraced the steps of Coryat's tour of Europe, as recounted in his book Continental Drifter (2000). In 2008 Daniel Allen published an account of his nine-month cycle trip following Coryat's journey to the East, entitled The Sky Above, the Kingdom Below.

Lonely Planet founder Tony Wheeler spoke at the Australian Festival of Travel Writing about Thomas Coryat. Wheeler traced Coryate's (his spelling) journey as he observed the invention of leisure travel. He visited his supposed tomb at Rajgari near Surat in 2010.

Indian poet, writer and columnist Dom Moraes and architect Sarayu Srivatsa retraced aspects of Coryat's legendary route and intertwined Coryat's historical 17th-century biography with their own modern travel narrative titled "The Long Strider: How Thomas Coryate Walked from England to India in the Year 1613" published by Speaking Tiger Books in 2003.

== See also ==
- John Sandford (poet)
- William Stansby

== References and further reading ==
- Adams, Percy G. Travel Literature and the Evolution of the Novel. Lexington: UP of Kentucky, 1983. 215–22. ISBN 0-8131-1492-6..
- Allen, Daniel The Sky Above, The Kingdom Below. London, Haus, 2008. ISBN 1-905791-30-5
- Chaney, Edward, "Thomas Coryate", The Grove-Macmillan Dictionary of Art.
- Chaney, Edward, The Evolution of the Grand Tour, 2nd ed, Routledge, London, 2000. ISBN 0-7146-4474-9
- Chisholm, Hugh, ed. (1911). "Coryate, Thomas" . Encyclopædia Britannica. Vol. 7 (11th ed.). Cambridge University Press. p. 211.
- Moraes, Dom and Sarayu Srivatsa. The Long Strider : How Thomas Coryate Walked From England to India in the Year 1613. New Delhi: Penguin, 2003. ISBN 0-670-04975-1.
- Moore, Tim The Grand Tour, St. Martin's Press, New York, 2001. ISBN 0-312-28156-0
- Penrose, Boies. Urbane Travelers: 1591–1635. Philadelphia: U of Pennsylvania P, 1942. LCCN 42-019537.
- Petroski, Henry (1992), The evolution of useful things, New York: Alfred A. Knopf, ISBN 978-0-6797-4039-1
- Pritchard, R.E. Odd Tom Coryate: The English Marco Polo. Thrupp, Stroud, Gloucestershire: Sutton, 2004. ISBN 0-7509-3416-6.
- Strachan, Michael. The Life and Adventures of Thomas Coryate. London: Oxford UP, 1962. LCCN 62-052512.
- Whittaker, David (ed.) Most Glorious & Peerless Venice: Observations of Thomas Coryate (1608). Wavestone Press, Charlbury, 2013. 978-09545194-7-6 (Contains the Venice section of the 'Crudities', with photographs by the editor.)
