= Haunted (Palahniuk novel) =

2005 novel by Chuck Palahniuk

- First edition cover
- Author: Chuck Palahniuk
- Cover artist: Rodrigo Corral; Jeff Middleton
- Language: English
- Genre: Horror, satire, dark comedy
- Publisher: Doubleday
- Publication date: May 3, 2005
- Publication place: United States
- Media type: Print (Hardcover)
- Pages: 416
- ISBN: 0-385-50948-0
- OCLC: 56686360
- Dewey Decimal: 813/.54 22
- LC Class: PS3566.A4554 H38 2005
- Preceded by: Diary
- Followed by: Rant

Haunted is a 2005 novel by Chuck Palahniuk. The plot is a frame story for a series of 23 short stories, most preceded by a free verse poem. Each story is followed by a chapter of the main narrative, as told by a character in that narrative, and ties back into the main story in some way. Typical of Palahniuk's work, the dominant motifs in Haunted are sexual deviance, sexual identity, desperation, social distastefulness, disease, murder, death, and existentialism.

The synopsis on the dustjacket describes Haunted as a satire of reality television, but according to Palahniuk, the novel is actually about "the battle for credibility" that has resulted from the ease with which one can publish through the use of modern technology.

== Plot summary ==
Each of the book's chapters contains three sections: a story chapter, which acts as a framing device for the otherwise unconnected short stories; a poem about a particular writer on the tour, its author being unspecified; and the short story written by that writer.

The main story centers on a group of seventeen individuals (all of whom go by nicknames based on the story they tell) who have decided to participate in a secret writers' retreat, frequently compared by characters to the Villa Diodati retreat of 1816. After having noticed an invitation to the retreat posted on the bulletin board of a café in Oregon, the characters follow instructions on the invitation to meet Mr. Whittier, the retreat's organizer. Whittier tells them to each wait for a bus to pick them up the next morning but to bring minimal luggage.

The next day, the seventeen characters, Whittier, and his assistant Mrs. Clark are driven to an abandoned theater. Whittier locks all of them inside the theater, telling them they have three months to each write a magnum opus before he will allow them to leave. In the meantime, they will have enough food and water to survive, as well as heat, electricity, bedrooms, bathrooms, and a clothes washing and drying machine provided.

At first, they all seem to live under harmless conditions. However, the group eventually decide that they could make a better story of their own suffering inside the theater and become rich after the public discovers their fate. They then begin to individually sabotage the food and utilities provided to them, with each character trying to only destroy one food or utility to slightly increase the drama of their stay. Since the characters are not coordinating their plans, they end up destroying all their food and utilities, forcing all of them to struggle to survive starvation, cold, and darkness.

With Whittier accidentally dying from a stomach rupture, the writers find themselves trapped without him. Believing a great increase in their suffering will provide a better story for when they're rescued, several writers start to willingly engage in self-mutilation and cannibalism, doing so to give the pretense Whittier tortured them. As they begin committing suicide, killing one another, or succumbing to their ailments, they continue to formulate their story while the theater somehow repairs its broken utilities.

With numerous people dead, Mrs. Clark included, the writers continue to sabotage themselves, such as destroying the lighting and wasting any additional food supplies they find. The 11 remaining writers eventually group in the main theater, only for Whittier to appear and reveal he faked his death (with Clark's help) and has been observing the writers through hidden cameras. Informing the writers their three months have passed and that they are free to leave, Whittier notes that, by continuing to blame him for everything and playing the victim to extreme extents, they have not acted any differently from the other groups. Whittier unlocks the exit and leaves with Miss Sneezy, choosing her as the person he saves and offering her a new life. Mother Nature, objecting that they need to wait a little longer for other writers to die and for someone to rescue them, stabs Miss Sneezy. To prevent Whittier from leaving with her, they drag Miss Sneezy back inside and break the lock, and continue to wait for rescue.

== Characters ==
The following are the 19 characters in the main narrative, along with the stories they tell:

Character	Story	Description
Brandon Whittier	Dog Years	A rich man who is a wheelchair user owns the abandoned theatre and hosts the writers' retreat. Though he appears to be a very old man, he is in fact a thirteen-year-old boy who suffers from progeria. He amassed his wealth by convincing middle-aged married women to sleep with him by telling them that he was an eighteen-year-old virgin, then blackmailing them into giving him money in exchange for silence.
Brandon Whittier	Obsolete	A rich man who is a wheelchair user owns the abandoned theatre and hosts the writers' retreat. Though he appears to be a very old man, he is in fact a thirteen-year-old boy who suffers from progeria. He amassed his wealth by convincing middle-aged married women to sleep with him by telling them that he was an eighteen-year-old virgin, then blackmailing them into giving him money in exchange for silence.
Tess Clark	Post-Production	A housewife turned failed amateur porn actress. Her teenage daughter Cassandra suddenly disappeared, only to be found three months later suffering from severe physical and mental trauma. Learning Cassandra was at Whittier's retreat and that her wounds were self-inflicted, Tess becomes curious as to what her daughter experienced. Upset Cassandra would never return to normal, Tess later euthanized her daughter by overdose, only to be discovered by the police. Now a fugitive, Tess became Whittier's assistant to escape the police and learn what her daughter experienced.
Tess Clark	The Nightmare Box	
Tess Clark	Poster Child	
Tess Clark	Cassandra	
Saint Gut-Free	Guts	An abnormally skinny man who, following a masturbation accident involving a pool filter, lost part of his lower intestine.
Mother Nature	Foot Work	A reflexologist and homeopathic therapy expert who was once employed in prostitution based around her skills with reflexology. She has joined the retreat to escape the Russian Mafia, after becoming an accessory to the murder of her friend's pimp.
Miss America	Green Room	A pregnant model who wants to become famous by promoting an exercise device on daytime television.
Lady Baglady (Evelyn "Muffy" Keyes)	Slumming	An old money woman who, along with her husband, used to pretend to be homeless as a cure for boredom. After she and her husband witness a crime leading to the murder of a wealthy Brazilian heiress, her husband is murdered by the killers, and a string of homeless people are murdered in the search for her. She comes to the retreat to escape the people who want to kill her.
The Earl of Slander	Swan Song	A reporter who murders a former child star to frame him for collecting child pornography, so that he can write a Pulitzer Prize-winning article about it.
The Duke of Vandals (Terry Fletcher)	Ambition	An amateur artist who sneaks his paintings into museums. He later becomes a respected professional when he murders a famous artist as a favor to the man's patron. Believing he will suffer the same fate as the man he killed, he has come to the retreat to escape his employers.
Director Denial	Exodus	A social worker at a police station. She brings with her a cat named Cora Reynolds, named after its former owner, a co-worker who killed herself trying to stop police officers from using anatomically correct child dolls for sexual purposes.
Reverend Godless (Jenson)	Punch Drunk	A former Marine who, with a group of soldiers, raises money by lip-syncing in drag and allowing annoyed people to assault them for a fee. He used the funds raised to start a war on religion.
The Matchmaker	Ritual	A man who dresses similar to a cowboy. After his girlfriend denied his marriage proposal, he hired a male prostitute to ruin her idea of the perfect man and change her mind. Rather than being autobiographical, his story is an extended "joke" he learned from his uncles, which is in fact an anecdote about a freak castration accident in a Nazi POW camp that saved their lives.
Sister Vigilante	Civil Twilight	A religious woman who carries a bowling ball, with which she may or may not have killed people.
Chef Assassin (Richard Talbott)	Product Placement	A professional chef who murders critics who write negative reviews of his cooking. He uses the murders to blackmail knife manufacturers, threatening to tell the world that he uses only their knives to commit his deeds.
Comrade Snarky	Speaking Bitterness	A woman who is critical of other women's looks. As a child, her parents divorced and her mother continually warned her that her father might sexually abuse her. Although he never did, she has been wary and critical of men for her entire life as a result. She came to the writers' retreat after she and the members of a women's retreat sexually assaulted an individual, believing the individual to be a post-operative transgender woman. In the end, it is strongly implied the person they assaulted was actually cisgender.
Agent Tattletale (Eugene Denton)	Crippled	A man who continued to receive worker's compensation after he recovered from a severe injury. Killing a private investigator with evidence he has committed fraud, he takes the investigator's job and is almost killed by a woman on whom he spied.
The Missing Link	Dissertation	A member of the Chewlah tribe, who are claimed to be able to transform into sasquatches. Dating a woman who claims a certain plane crash was caused by a female sasquatch, The Missing Link states his sister was the girl in question.
The Countess Foresight (Claire Upton)	Something's Got to Give	A woman with psychic powers who experiences visions from touching objects. She was arrested for murdering the owner of an antique shop, who would not let her touch items; the items included the unborn child of Marilyn Monroe located in a milky jar of fluid. Believing the man to be Monroe's murderer, she killed him to get the antique, only to learn it was fake. She now wears an electronic tracking bracelet as part of the terms of her parole.
The Baroness Frostbite (Miss Leroy)	Hot Potting	A former employee of the White River Lodge, she tried to rescue a chef she employed after he fell into a nearby hot springs, only to lose her lips to frostbite in the process.
Miss Sneezy (Lisa Noonan)	Evil Spirits	A woman with chronic sinus problems. She claims to carry an incurable airborne disease, and was contained on an island quarantine facility by the government. Required to wear an insulated suit and oxygen mask when outdoors, she used the airtight suit to escape the island by swimming underwater to the nearest coast.

== "Guts" ==
The book is best known for the short story "Guts", which had been published before the book in the March 2004 issue of Playboy magazine as well as on Palahniuk's website. New York City public school teacher Greg Van Voorhis was suspended for letting his English class read "Guts".

=== Plot summary ===
"Guts" begins with the narrator, aptly named "Saint Gut-Free", telling the reader to hold their breath for the duration of the story.

The narrator then describes three stories of male masturbation gone horribly awry. In the first story, an adolescent boy inserts a Vaseline-lubricated carrot into his rectum to stimulate his prostate, then, in haste, stashes it in a pile of laundry when he is called to dinner. Later, his mother takes the laundry away and presumably discovers the used carrot, but never mentions the incident. Next, the narrator tells the tale of a young boy who, having heard that it enhances masturbatory pleasure, inserts a thin stick of candle wax into his urethra. The wax unexpectedly slips back into the boy's bladder, thereby blocking his urine flow and causing blood to seep from his penis. Because he requires expensive surgery, his parents are forced to pay to repair his bladder with the boy's college savings. Finally, the narrator explains how he himself suffered a sexual injury, when sitting on the water-intake valve at the bottom of his home swimming pool while masturbating. While swimming down to the bottom of the pool to stimulate his prostate before coming up for air—a repetitive process he refers to as "pearl diving"—the suction from the valve causes his rectum and lower intestines to prolapse and become tangled in the filter. Ultimately, he finds himself stuck on the bottom of the pool and must gnaw through his own innards to free himself and avoid drowning. When Saint Gut-Free's sister later becomes pregnant, he falsely believes that he is the father of an incestuous child, since he thinks his sister has encountered the semen he leaves in their family swimming pool on that fateful day (she is actually pregnant by her boyfriend and decided to have an abortion).

In between the main stories, Saint Gut-Free muses over families who cover up their loved ones' accidental deaths by autoerotic asphyxiation. In doing so, he highlights the theme of sexual repression throughout the tale. For example, in all three cases of sexual trauma, the parents are aware of the erotic nature of their son's accidents, but never discuss them afterwards. As a result, their sons are forced figuratively to "hold their breath" in the silence that lingers. Saint Gut-Free refers to these moments of sexual repression as the "invisible carrot," referring to both the mother in the first story and to the total denial of all the parents involved. At the end, the narrator tells the reader they can now take a breath, as he still has not taken one himself.

== Reception ==
Haunted received mixed to favorable reviews from critics upon its release. Haunted received a negative review from The New York Times columnist Tom Shone who noted that despite being referred to as a horror novel it is "stubbornly unscary. It burps up its shock moments with so little ceremony that the Gothic virtue of stealthily sidewinding suspense – the art of allowing a story to steal up on you before you even knew it was there – is left whistling in the wind." Shone additionally noted the repetitive nature of many of the stories within the novel noting that every story, regardless of which character was narrating, all wrote with Palahniuk's distinctive style.

Tasha Robinson of The A.V. Club reviewed the novel soon after its release, giving it a positive review, stating "Palahniuk is as unique and colorful as ever, with his predilection for odd factoids and weird twists. But none of this makes the arbitrary deaths, the ludicrous behavior, or the pages upon pages about corpse-rot and vivisection any easier to deal with. Like his characters, Palahniuk sometimes seems to be operating under the presumption that he can never sink too low, or vomit up too much. Here's hoping he's wrong, for everyone's sake."

== Editions ==
- ISBN 0-385-50948-0 (hardcover, 2005)
- ISBN 1-4000-3282-2 (paperback, 2006)
