= Bomber Restaurant =

Defunct restaurant in Milwaukie, Oregon, U.S.

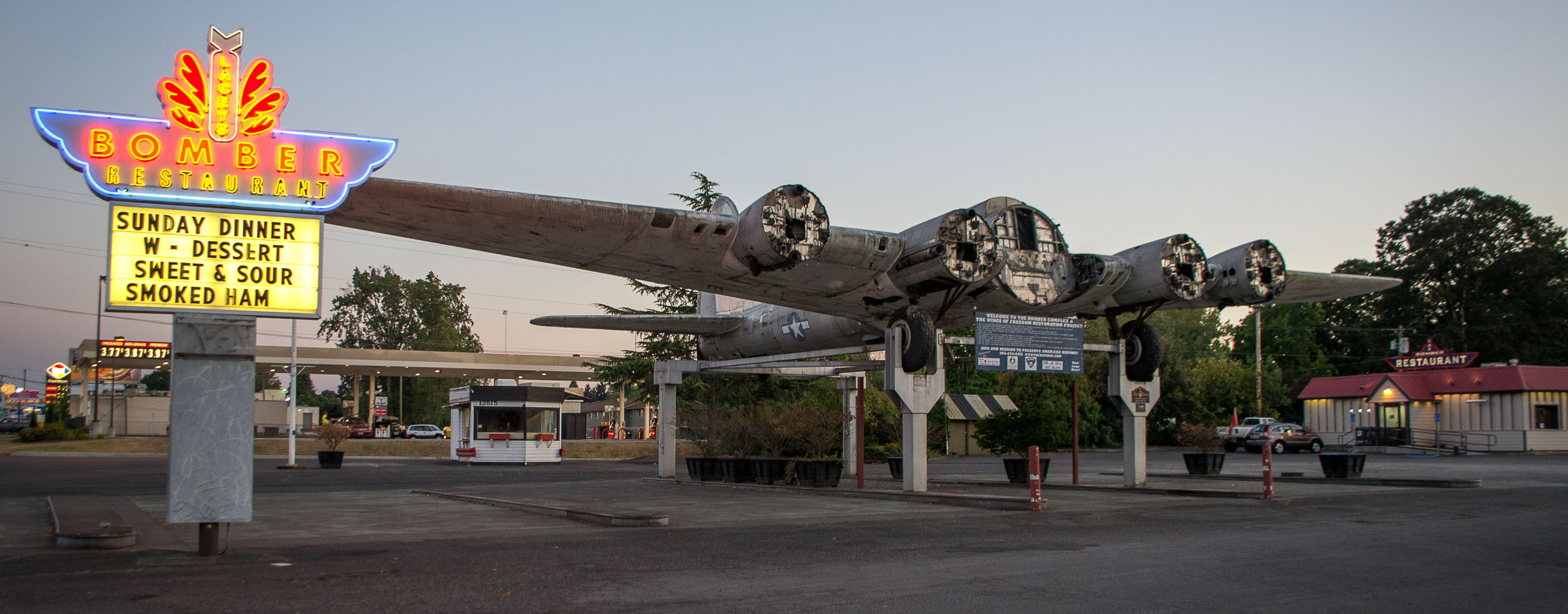
- The Bomber Restaurant in Milwaukie, Oregon, at sunset
- Interactive map of Bomber Restaurant

Restaurant information
- Established: 1947
- Closed: 2020
- Location: 13515 Southeast McLoughlin Boulevard, Milwaukie, Oregon, United States
- Coordinates: 45.425°N 122.634°W

The Bomber Restaurant operated in Milwaukie, Oregon for 73 years.

In 1947, Art Lacey purchased a B-17 bomber for $13,000 and flew it from Oklahoma to Troutdale. He then disassembled it, transported it covertly, and placed it atop his 48-pump gas station. Lacey also opened the Bomber Restaurant and motel. The gas station was closed in 1991; Lacey died in 2000. The cockpit was removed for restoration, probably in the 2000s. The entire B-17 was disassembled and removed in 2014 for restoration.

The site was listed in Chuck Palahniuk's book Fugitives and Refugees (2003).
