= Stranger than Fiction: True Stories =

2004 book by Chuck Palahniuk

Stranger Than Fiction: True Stories
- First edition cover
- Author: Chuck Palahniuk
- Cover artist: Jacket design by Rodrigo Corral; Jacket photograph by Michael Schmelling
- Language: English
- Subject: Articles, interviews, autobiography
- Publisher: Doubleday
- Publication date: June 15, 2004
- Publication place: United States
- Media type: Print (hardcover & paperback), audio cassette, audio CD, and audio download
- Pages: 233 pp (first edition, hardcover)
- ISBN: 0-385-50448-9 (first edition, hardcover)
- OCLC: 53476520
- Dewey Decimal: 813/.54 22
- LC Class: PS3566.A4554 S77 2004

Stranger Than Fiction: True Stories (published in the United Kingdom & Australia as Non-Fiction) is a non-fiction book by Chuck Palahniuk, published in 2004. It is a collection of essays, stories, and interviews written for various magazines and newspapers. Some of the pieces had also been previously published on the internet. The book is divided into three sections: "People Together", articles about people who find unique ways of achieving togetherness; "Portraits", interviews and short essays mostly about famous people; and "Personal", autobiographical pieces.

An abridged audiobook version read by the author was released at the same time as the print edition. An unabridged version co-read by Dennis Boutsikaris was released later.

== Editions ==
- ISBN 0-385-50448-9 (hardcover, 2004)
- ISBN 0-7393-1238-3 (audiobook CD, 2004)
- ISBN 0-7393-1237-5 (audiobook cassette, 2004)
- ISBN 0-385-72222-2 (paperback, 2005)

== See also ==
- Fugitives and Refugees: A Walk in Portland, Oregon, Palahniuk's other non-fiction work.
