= Choke (novel) =

2001 novel by Chuck Palahniuk

- First edition cover
- Author: Chuck Palahniuk
- Cover artist: Rodrigo Corral; Bob Larkin
- Language: English
- Genre: Satire, Black comedy
- Publisher: Doubleday
- Publication date: May 22, 2001
- Publication place: United States
- Media type: Print (hardcover)
- Pages: 304
- ISBN: 0-385-50156-0
- OCLC: 44905122
- Dewey Decimal: 813/.54 21
- LC Class: PS3566.A4554 C47 2001
- Preceded by: Invisible Monsters
- Followed by: Lullaby

Choke is a 2001 satirical novel by American author Chuck Palahniuk. The story focuses on Victor, a sex addict and con man who also works at a colonial reenactment museum. The novel was later adapted for film by Clark Gregg.

== Plot summary ==
Choke follows Victor Mancini and his friend Denny through a few months of their lives with frequent flashbacks to the days when Victor was a child. Victor had grown up moving from one foster home to another as his mother was found to be unfit to raise him. During his childhood, his mother would kidnap him from his various foster parents. However, they would eventually be caught each time, and Mancini would again be remanded over to the child welfare agency.

In the present-day setting of the book, Victor has left medical school to support his feeble mother, who is now in a nursing home. In order to pay for elder care for his mother, he resorts to being a con artist. Victor goes to various restaurants and purposely causes himself to choke midway through his meal, luring a "good Samaritan" into saving his life. He keeps a detailed list of everyone who saves him and sends them frequent letters about fictional bills he is unable to pay, causing them to send him money out of sympathy.

Victor works at a re-enactment museum set in colonial times, where most of the employees are drug addicts or, in Denny's case, a fellow recovering sex addict. He spends most of his time on the job guarding Denny (who is constantly being caught with "contraband" items that do not correspond with the time period of the museum) in the stocks. The two met at a sex addiction support group and later applied together for the same job. Denny is later fired from the museum, and begins collecting stones from around the city to build his "dream home".

While growing up, Victor's mother taught him numerous conspiracy theories and obscure medical facts, which both confused and frightened him. This and his constant moves from one home to another have left Victor unable to form lasting and stable relationships with women. As a result, Victor finds himself getting sexual gratification from women on a solely superficial level. Later on, he starts talking to his mother again for the first time in years.

== Film adaptation ==
A film adaptation directed by Clark Gregg, starring Sam Rockwell and Anjelica Huston, was released commercially on September 26, 2008. Palahniuk makes a cameo appearance in the film.

== Editions ==
- ISBN 0-385-50156-0 (hardcover; New York: Doubleday, 2001)
- ISBN 1-58945-971-7 (e-book, 2001)
- ISBN 0-385-72092-0 (paperback; New York: Anchor, 2002)

== Trivia ==
- Much of Palahniuk's research on Choke was conducted with total strangers at the gym and sexual addiction groups.
- A song by Scottish band Biffy Clyro is titled "Joy.Discovery.Invention" after a line in the novel.
