= Snuff (Palahniuk novel) =

2008 novel by Chuck Palahniuk

- First edition
- Author: Chuck Palahniuk
- Cover artist: Rodrigo Corral
- Language: English
- Genre: Satire
- Publisher: Doubleday
- Publication date: May 20, 2008
- Publication place: United States
- Media type: Print (hardcover)
- Pages: 208
- ISBN: 978-0-385-51788-1
- OCLC: 165082972
- Dewey Decimal: 813/.54 22
- LC Class: PS3566.A4554 S68 2008

Snuff is a satirical novel by Chuck Palahniuk that was released on May 20, 2008.

== Plot ==
Snuff follows three men who are waiting to immortalize themselves into pornography history as they wait to bed Cassie Wright, a former porn queen who has fallen into harder times. Each chapter follows a different guy (Mr. 600, Mr. 72, and Mr. 137), as well as Sheila, the female wrangler who dictates who is the next to be filmed with Cassie Wright. As the three men wait, each starts to divulge their true reasons for wanting to be filmed, as well as discuss the sordid history of Cassie Wright and her reason for suddenly dropping out of the pornography industry for a year. As backgrounds, secrets, and would-be children start to appear, the tensions in the room start to rise and in the end the true secrets of her comeback, and who really is Cassie Wright's porn child, are the last things any of them suspect.

== Film ==
A film version was in production starring Tom Sizemore, to be written and directed by Golan Ramras and Fabien Martorell, and to be produced by Immortal Transmedia. Although many other Palahniuk films have been put in production, this one has seen more light than the others. The film version of the novel would be the third book by Palahniuk to be made into a film after Fight Club and Choke.

At one point, it was reported that Daryl Hannah and Thora Birch were also attached to the project. The claims were later dismissed by Hannah and Birch, while Sizemore was reportedly still interested in the project.

== Background ==
- The story was originally inspired by Annabel Chong, who set the record for engaging in 251 sex acts with around 70 men in 10 hours.
- The book release around Mother's Day is intentional, due to one of the subplots of the novel involving a mother-child relationship.
