= Doomed (novel) =

2013 novel by Chuck Palahniuk

- First edition
- Author: Chuck Palahniuk
- Cover artist: Rodrigo Corral
- Language: English
- Publisher: Doubleday
- Publication date: October 8, 2013
- Publication place: United States
- Media type: Print (hardcover)
- Pages: 336
- ISBN: 978-0385533034
- Preceded by: Damned

Doomed is a 2013 novel by Chuck Palahniuk. It is the second novel in a planned trilogy that started with Damned.

== Plot ==
Doomed follows Madison Spencer after she escapes from Hell, doomed to wander Earth in a state of purgatory for a year, haunting her parents. Doomed gives us a clearer view of Madison's childhood and explains why she was damned to Hell.
