= Damned (novel) =

2011 novel by Chuck Palahniuk

- Doubleday cover
- Author: Chuck Palahniuk
- Cover artist: Rodrigo Corral
- Language: English
- Publisher: Jonathan Cape
- Publication date: September 1, 2011
- Publication place: United States
- Media type: Print (hardcover)
- Pages: 247
- ISBN: 978-0-224-09115-2
- Followed by: Doomed

Damned is a 2011 novel by Chuck Palahniuk. A sequel to the novel, Doomed, was released in 2013.

== Plot ==
The novel opens with 13-year-old Madison "Maddy" Spencer waking in Hell, unsure of the details surrounding her death. She believes she died of a marijuana overdose while her celebrity parents were attending the Academy Awards. Maddy quickly gets to know her nearby cellmates. The group (loosely modeled on the archetypes of characters from The Breakfast Club, i.e., a rocker, a nerd, a beauty and a jock) take Maddy on a tour of Hell.

In Hell, Madison works as a telemarketer, calling the living during mealtimes to ask them inane survey questions. For the most part, only the terminally ill and elderly answer Madison's surveys and they are charmed by her. They are so charmed that Madison convinces them to commit mortal sins so they can spend eternity in Hell with her. Madison becomes the top recruiter of souls for the damned and begins to collect an army of admirers and friends with whom she conquers all of the "bullies" of Hell including Adolf Hitler, Vlad the Impaler, Ethelred II and Catherine de Medici. She uses her new-found army to beautify Hell; Madison then orders them to paint the bats to make them look more like birds, drain a lake of saliva, and so on. Madison's sway becomes so large that eventually Satan himself tries to convince her that she is one of his own creations, specially designed to lure souls into his dominion.

Throughout the novel, Madison's interactions with the living as well as the dead are depicted as she tries to piece together the events surrounding her death, and figure out how best to cope with her dire circumstances. She eventually learns that she was accidentally strangled to death by her adopted brother, Goran, in a game of erotic asphyxiation that she learned while attending boarding school.

Just as Madison begins to carve a niche for herself, she finds out she was sent to Hell in error and can go to heaven, if she so chooses. Instead, she opts to stay in Hell. The novel concludes with a cliffhanger as Madison goes to confront Satan, suggesting that her adventures will continue in a sequel.

== Production ==
The novel is based on the structure of Judy Blume novels, particularly Are You There God? It's Me, Margaret. The novel was written by Palahniuk as a way to deal with his mother's death from lung cancer in 2009.

Palahniuk has described the novel as "if The Shawshank Redemption had a baby by The Lovely Bones and it was raised by Judy Blume." and "it's kind of like The Breakfast Club set in Hell."
