= Tell-All =

2010 novel by Chuck Palahniuk

- First edition cover
- Author: Chuck Palahniuk
- Illustrator: Eric Danner
- Cover artist: Rodrigo Corral
- Language: English
- Publisher: Doubleday
- Publication date: May 4, 2010
- Publication place: United States
- Media type: Print (Hardcover)
- Pages: 179
- ISBN: 978-0-385-52635-7
- LC Class: PS3566.A4554 T45

Tell-All is a novel by Chuck Palahniuk, released on May 4, 2010. It is his 11th novel. A preview video, with the tagline: "Boy Meets Girl. Boy Gets Girl. Boy Kills Girl?", was released to entice fans prior to the novel's release.

== Plot summary ==
The novel, an homage to the Golden Age of Hollywood, is narrated by Hazel "Hazie" Coogan, a lifelong employee and caretaker of aging actress Katherine "Miss Kathie" Kenton.

When a suitor named Webster Carlton Westward III manages to weasel his way into Miss Kathie's heart (and bed), Hazie appears suspicious. Upon apparently discovering that Westward has already written a celebrity tell-all memoir foretelling Miss Kathie's death in a forthcoming Lillian Hellman–penned musical extravaganza, Hazie warns Kathie that Westward's intentions may be less than honorable, and may even be deadly.
