= Make Something Up =

2015 short story collection by Chuck Palahniuk

Make Something Up: Stories You Can't Unread
- First edition
- Author: Chuck Palahniuk
- Language: English
- Genre: Short story collection
- Publisher: Doubleday
- Publication place: United States
- Pages: 256

Make Something Up: Stories You Can't Unread is a collection of short stories published on May 26, 2015, and written by Chuck Palahniuk.

Make Something Up ranked No. 8 on the ALA's list of the Top Ten Challenged Books of 2016, due to profanity, sexual explicitness, and being "disgusting and all around offensive."

== Stories ==
- "Knock Knock" (Dec 2010 of Playboy) - The narrator recounts their relationship with their father, who taught them many off-color jokes as a child that they repeated without knowing what they meant. Their father now suffers from terminal prostate cancer. The narrator tries to make him laugh before he dies, but no matter how many of the jokes they tell, he never laughs. They realize, eventually, that they were the butt of the joke all along.
- "Eleanor" - Written with many malapropisms. Randy hates trees and moves from Oregon to California with his pit bull called Eleanor. He marries a realtor called Gazelle. On Christmas Eleanor chews a nativity figure of Baby Jesus and Gazelle then buys a large Christmas tree.
- "How Monkey Got Married, Bought a House and Found Happiness in Orlando" - Akin to an Aesop folktale. Monkey works successfully in sales in Llewelyn Food Marketers Inc. and is determined to advance her career in Orlando. Her boss gives her cheese to sell, but it smells so bad that no one will buy it. Persuaded by the crowd, Monkey finally forces herself to try the cheese and finds that it's delicious, but nobody believes her.
- "Zombies" (Nov 2013 of Playboy) - High schoolers begin electrocuting themselves by applying a cardiac defibrillator's electrodes to their temples and turning it on, which results in permanent brain damage. Dubbing it "The Great Leap Backwards", more and more people begin electrocuting themselves in order to willfully return to a state of childlike ignorance. At the airport, the narrator, Trevor, applies the electrodes to his head and is about to turn it on, but his Uncle stops him.
- "Loser" (Stories, 2010) - A fraternity called Zeta Delta has a rushing tradition where they take LSD and sit in the audience of a quiz game (based on The Price Is Right). One frat member makes it to the final round of the contest but, high on LSD, ends up bidding a "million, trillion gah-zillion dollars and ninety-nine cents", which disqualifies him from the game and ends up getting his would-be prizes given to the winner in addition to her prizes. The winner, an old woman, then dies of a heart attack onstage.
- "Red Sultan's Big Boy" - A man buys his 13-year-old daughter Lisa an Arabian stallion to replace her horse which died the previous week. People shun the family and the horse, discussing rumors about its past, as the father begins to get calls from people offering increasing amounts of money for the horse. It's revealed that the horse appeared in a viral bestiality video in which a man died later of a ruptured colon. Lisa and her friends have all seen the video, and she is charging her friends to visit the horse and take selfies with it. Upon finding out that Lisa killed her previous horse in order to obtain the famous stallion from the video, her father releases the horse into the wild. (see Enumclaw horse sex case)
- "Romance" (Aug 2011 of Playboy) - The overweight narrator talks about his previous girlfriend, who was also overweight, but eventually lost a significant amount of weight and began receiving attention from other men. It turned out she lost the weight due to cancer, and later died. He does not believe he will ever meet anyone, then at Lollapalooza he falls in love with an eccentric woman named Britney who seems out of his league. Despite his misgivings with his friends who think she is retarded, alcoholic, drug-addict, and a nymphomaniac, he marries her and has twins with her.
- "Cannibal" (May 2013 of Playboy) - Written with many euphemisms. When a high school gym class is picking teams, neither team wants a boy nicknamed "Cannibal", who it is revealed once performed cunnilingus on a girl named Marcia Sanders who claimed to not have known she was pregnant. He sucks out and accidentally swallows the small fetus, earning him his nickname.
- "Why Coyote Never had Money for Parking" - Another Aesop-esque folktale. Coyote works at Llewelyn Food and is married with a child. Every night, Coyote puts the baby in his car and slowly drive around town in order to get the baby to go to sleep. He meets Flamingo, a sex worker, and begins seeing her frequently, feeling guilty about his infidelity. Eventually, he finds out from his wife that Flamingo is a transvestite.
- "Phoenix" - Ted's daughter April is blind as a result of toxoplasmosis triggered by their cat called Belinda Carlisle. In flashbacks, it's revealed that Ted's wife Rachel wanted him to get rid of the cat, fearing it would affect her pregnancy. When he refused, she began combing hairspray into the cat's fur and overfeeding it to get it to use the litter box more frequently. Knowing the cat used the granite in the gas fireplace as a litter box, she waited until the cat was in the fireplace, then turned it on. The burning cat then ran through the house, setting it alight, before dying upstairs.
- "The Facts of Life" - Troy's father, determined to outdo his own father's explanation of sex, tells his son a story about two people having sex at a drive-in movie theatre. Using hand sanitizer to cover up an unpleasant smell, the encounter results in the man's genitals accidentally being set on fire. The story of the hand sanitizer accident itself is told as one extended run-on sentence.
- "Cold Calling" - A high schooler named Bill (who lives in Walla Walla, Washington) tries to sell potential customers a floor mop called the Wonder Wet Wipe, a floor mop; but the callers keep side-tracking him and racially abuse him while he tries to keep to the sales script. He ends up pretending to be Hindu and forming a friendship over the phone with a girl he later finds out was lying about being Black.
- "The Toad Prince" - Ethan reveals to a woman named Mona that he has been injecting his penis with various diseases as a form of body modification and it is now horrifically deformed. Unlike his past partners, Mona doesn't mind, and kisses him as his penis grows into a large, moving creature.
- "Smoke" - A man has a fear that language has become a separate entity.
- "Torcher" - Rainbow Bright is an organizer of a Burning Man-type festival. The morning after a sandstorm, a murder is discovered and Rainbow tries to keep things under control.
- "Liturgy" - The remains of a placenta have been found by various neighborhood dogs, and the poker-faced homeowners board have investigated but cannot find those responsible.
- "Why Aardvark Never Landed on the Moon" - In the final Aesop folktale, fifth-graders Rooster, Aardvark and Rabbit are constantly bullied for being good students. After Warthog beats them up for playing chess at recess, they decide to form "The Flunk Club" and begin failing on purpose and sniffing glue in the hopes of getting held back from fifth grade, with the eventual goal of being far older and stronger than anyone in their class. They end up becoming bullies themselves, and when they find one of their old chess pieces on the playground, they cannot remember what it is and instead burn it and get high on the fumes.
- "Fetch" (Dark Delicacies III, 2009) - After playing fetch with a dog in a graveyard, the protagonist's tennis ball lands on a grave and begins moving on its own. The ball leads him to a buried collection of gold coins and tasks him with returning it to the old woman whose husband the coins once belonged to. It's revealed that the grave the ball landed on was her husband's grave.
- "Expedition" - Set in Hamburg before the events of Fight Club, Felix M is fascinated by the depravity of the city, writing a book revealing its dark side. Felix is told about a "monstrous child" and is led into a maze of dark tunnels where he meets his father and Tyler Durden.
- "Mister Elegant" (Dec 2006 of Vice) - A male stripper has an epileptic seizure onstage, which is filmed by a patron and ends up going viral. He ends up forming a troupe of disabled strippers.
- "Tunnel of Love" A massage therapist provides euthanasia to dying clients.
- "Inclinations" - Kevin pretends he's gay in order to get his parents to send him to conversion therapy, as he heard rumors that there would be unlimited access to women. He finds out that every boy on his floor is pretending to be gay to extort money and praise from their conservative parents. He and the other boys are forced to dissect the corpse of a teenage girl named Betsey who died in a motorcycle accident. A boy named Troublemaker reveals to Kevin that she is actually a lesbian and "Betsy" was actually her girlfriend Suede. She tells him that she got an older couple to pose as her parents and disguised herself as a boy to sneak into the facility and recover Suede's body. Kevin and his friends smuggle Suede out and bury her. Troublemaker stabs the man running the facility, and all the boys take the fall for her in court.
- "How a Jew Saved Christmas" - During a workplace Secret Santa, Miley receives low-quality gifts, such as bad-tasting fudge and an unflattering portrait of her, that she is convinced are being given to her out of spite. To try and weed out the culprit, she gifts everyone in the workplace blatantly offensive gifts, including giving her Jewish coworker Deborah a ham with the inscription "Merry Christmas, Shylock". A woman named Clara reveals that she sent Miley the gifts and they were well-intentioned. Deborah takes off her diamond bracelet and gives it to Clara when she begins to cry.

== Reception ==
Sandra Newman in The Guardian has many reservations: "In Palahniuk, we have a writer at the height of his powers, but who refuses to use those powers for good, and sometimes refuses to use them at all; who would rather soak his powers in urine, then eat them and vomit them into your lap. It's a performance that can be exhilarating when graceful, but simply painful when it is not. He is an enfant terrible in desperate need of adult supervision, and one wishes Palahniuk's editors would convince him not to publish his flimsiest tantrums. I would love to read his next 'Knock-Knock', but not at the risk of reading his next 'Torcher'."

Mark Diston in The Register writes that "overall this collection is amusing, insightful and wickedly funny. Chuck Palahniuk is a different writer set free from the constrictions of writing a 'straight' novel. The same problems that made Beautiful You such a flawed work are still apparent in this collection, but Make Something Up is a much more relaxed, playful and better book."
