= Invisible Monsters =

1999 novel by Chuck Palahniuk

- First edition cover
- Author: Chuck Palahniuk
- Cover artist: Archie Ferguson; Tommy Ewasko
- Language: English
- Genre: Novel, transgressive fiction, satire
- Publisher: W. W. Norton
- Publication date: September 1999
- Publication place: United States
- Media type: Print (Paperback)
- Pages: 297
- ISBN: 0-393-31929-6
- OCLC: 40954244
- Dewey Decimal: 813/.54 21
- LC Class: PS3566.A4554 I58 1999
- Preceded by: Survivor
- Followed by: Choke

Invisible Monsters is a satirical novel by American writer Chuck Palahniuk, published in 1999. It is his third novel to be published, though it was his second written novel (after Insomnia: If You Lived Here, You'd Be Home Already). The novel was originally supposed to be Palahniuk's first novel to be published, but it was rejected by the publisher for being too disturbing. After the success of his novel Fight Club, Invisible Monsters was given a second chance, and a revised version of it was published. The first edition was released in paperback in 1999. On June 11, 2012, it was published in hardcover, in a revised edition titled Invisible Monsters Remix (ISBN 978-0393083521).

== Plot ==
The narrator of the story, Shannon McFarland, is a disfigured former model who goes by multiple pseudonyms, notably Daisy St. Patience and Bubba Joan—identities given to her by Brandy Alexander. The novel opens in medias res on the wedding day of Evie Cottrell, whose house is burning to the ground. Brandy, who has been shot by Evie, asks the narrator to tell her life story. Her memories of her life and her relationship with Brandy are told in a non-linear sequence.

The narrator is the daughter of a farmer. Her older brother, Shane, was kicked out of the house for being gay after contracting gonorrhea. After their parents receive a phone call from a stranger that Shane is dead from AIDS, they become obsessive supporters of gay rights, so that even in death, Shane gets more parental attention than the narrator. This attention is a large source of resentment for the narrator towards her brother, and she sought a career in modeling in attempt to get attention for herself.

The narrator's best friend in modeling school is Evelyn "Evie" Cottrell, who begins a secret relationship with the narrator's boyfriend, Manus Kelley, a police officer. While driving down the highway, the narrator is mysteriously shot in the face and her jaw is torn off. She immediately drives to the hospital and recovers, but her lower jaw is lost; she keeps her disfigured face veiled and her modeling career has been destroyed. In group speech therapy she meets Brandy Alexander, a trans woman. During sessions, Brandy instructs the narrator in how to give herself a new life and a new identity, and gives her a new name, Daisy St. Patience, the first among many new identities.

Evie begs the narrator to come live with her but leaves for Cancún as soon as she arrives, leaving the narrator alone. The first night, Manus breaks into the house with a knife. Because of the rapid non-linear motion of the novel's events, the narrator has often referred to Manus as "Seth", an identity given to him by Brandy, and it is not until this moment in the novel that it becomes clear that Manus and Seth are the same person. When Manus and Evie's affair is exposed, both claim that the other shot the narrator. The narrator sets fire to Evie's house and overpowers and then forces Manus to ingest pills before locking him in the trunk of his own car.

The narrator flees to the hotel room where Brandy lives. She meets Brandy's roommates, the Rhea sisters, a trio of drag queens who are paying for Brandy's sex change operations. The narrator learns that Brandy is actually Shane, who strives to look like her sister (the narrator) through surgery. Brandy is unaware of the narrator's true identity and wants to find her sister. Brandy, the narrator, and Manus leave to travel the country. They frequently pretend to be wealthy clients to view expensive homes that are for sale and steal whatever drugs they can find, alternately ingesting or selling them. Later, the narrator learns of Brandy's stories of sexual abuse by police officer Manus as a teenager, leading to Shane's contracting gonorrhea, being assumed to be gay, and being kicked out. "Brandy" divulges that she is not actually transgender—Shane, not wanting to be himself after what he endured, has chosen to become a woman because he sees it as a way to disfigure himself and lose any sense of identity to become beyond the control of others.

One day the trio is viewing a home and realize that the realtor is Evie's mother, who reveals that Evie herself transitioned at a young age and that her parents are marrying her off to save themselves trouble. The trio attend the wedding. The narrator sets fire to Evie's house, thus returning to the opening scene of the novel.

It is revealed that Brandy originally met Evie in a transgender support group, in which Evie told Brandy of the narrator's accident. Brandy reveals she has always known that the narrator was her sister, Shannon McFarland. In turn, Shannon reveals that she shot herself in the face to escape from being beautiful and beholden to her career and relationships, mirroring Shane's decision to transition.

Later, at Brandy's side while she recovers in a hospital, Shannon determines that she has never truly loved anyone except her brother. Leaving her pocket book with all of her identification, she tells a sleeping Brandy that since Shane is still confused about what he wants out of life, he can have the only thing she has left, her identity as Shannon McFarland. The novel ends with Shannon leaving the hospital and into the world to find a new start.

In the Remix version, it is revealed that Shannon, now going by Daisy St. Patience full-time, has established a cemetery after her parents have died, in which people can buy plots for relatives they disliked with spiteful sayings carved into the tombstones. She also creates a group for disfigured women called "Elephant Women". In the end, she marries an unidentified man.

== Characters ==
- Shannon McFarland, The Narrator and former fashion model, now disfigured by a mysterious gunshot injury. She goes by many various names throughout the book, most notably Daisy St. Patience and Bubba-Joan.
- Brandy Alexander, Queen Supreme, aka Princess Princess—A transgender woman whom the narrator meets in the hospital shortly after her own mysterious gunshot injury. Brandy encourages Narrator to hide her disfigurement and attempt to live a new lifestyle.
- Manus Kelley—Narrator's ex-fiancé, an ex-police officer. He goes by many different names throughout the book.
- Evelyn "Evie" Cottrell—Narrator's former best friend, also a fashion model.
- The Rhea Sisters—Three male drag queens who Brandy describes as being family. They dote on her and pay for all of her surgeries.

== Invisible Monsters Remix ==
Originally released in paperback in 1999, the first hardcover edition of Invisible Monsters was published on June 11, 2012. This edition is a restructured version of the novel, entitled Invisible Monsters Remix. It contains a new author's introduction, explaining that the linear structure of the first edition was not the novel's original intent. Instead, this new edition of the novel presents the chapters in mixed order with instructions on which chapter to read next, and new chapters have also been added.

== Film adaptation ==
MacLaren Productions Inc. acquired rights to the novel in 2009 and planned to begin production of a film adaptation in Vancouver in spring 2011 but this never materialised. The company established a website to help raise support where people can demand the book be made into a movie by submitting their email, name and location online. A Facebook group was also set up under the name "Invisible Monsters Film" to raise awareness for the film and generate support.

== References in popular culture ==
Jeffree Star's song title "Your Heart is My Piñata" is a direct reference to the Katty Kathy quote of the Rhea sister's invention, with Jeffree's debut album Beauty Killer containing several references to the novel.

Panic! at the Disco's song "Time to Dance" heavily references the novel.

Motion City Soundtrack has a bonus track on their album Commit This to Memory titled "Invisible Monsters", in direct reference to the novel.

== Censorship ==
In August 2025, the Lukashenko regime added the book to the List of printed publications containing information messages and materials, the distribution of which could harm the national interests of Belarus.

== See also ==
- 1999 in literature
