= Pygmy (novel) =

2009 novel by Chuck Palahniuk

- First edition cover
- Author: Chuck Palahniuk
- Cover artist: Rodrigo Corral
- Language: English
- Genre: Satire
- Publisher: Doubleday
- Publication date: May 5, 2009
- Publication place: United States
- Media type: Print (hardcover)
- ISBN: 978-0-385-52634-0

Pygmy is an epistolary novel by Chuck Palahniuk. It was released on May 5, 2009.

== Plot ==
Operative 67, nicknamed "Pygmy", is a thirteen-year-old super soldier trained in combat and politics by an unnamed authoritarian and totalitarian country sent to America posing as a foreign exchange student to initiate a terrorist attack known as Operation Havoc. Pygmy and several other highly skilled teenagers like him are sent to live with host families in America and integrate into society. Pygmy arrives in the country and meets his family, the Cow Father who works in a government facility, the Chicken Mother who steals batteries to supply her vibrator collection, Cat Sister, whom Pygmy grows attracted to and Pig Dog Brother, who starts off antagonistic but later friendly.

Pygmy learns the habits and behaviors of American culture and constantly bickers about its strange environment and mannerisms as he participates in societal norms like going to church and attending school. At first, Pygmy and the other operatives are bullied by the other students but Pygmy gains notoriety when he stops Trevor Stonefield during a school shooting at a Model United Nations meeting. Trevor, who had been bullying Pygmy's host brother, was brutalized by Pygmy in a Wal-Mart bathroom, falling in love with him and realizing his repressed homosexuality. This event popularizes Pygmy and begins jarring his sense of self worth. Several times Pygmy reflects on the time in his home country before he was "adopted by the state," leaving behind his parents who were killed in an American attack and training with the totalitarian government.

To commence Operation Havoc the operatives are to impregnate several American girls to create a future army after America's collapse and to be in Washington D.C to start the terrorist attack. Pygmy tricks the student body to fetch him supplies he needs for a science fair project taking place in Washington. Pygmy also gathers supplies with his host sister by sneaking into the government facility his host father stays, acquiring a neurotoxin which he uses to kill the local pastor who's been having sexual relationships with several underage girls. As Pygmy's stay in America grows longer, he starts to doubt his position and starts to become self aware of what he is doing. This causes the other operatives to grow suspicious. At the school science fair, Pygmy and the other operatives sabotage the students projects, allowing Pygmy to advance to Washington for the National Science Fair.

Cat sister gets angry at Pygmy for ruining her project and vows revenge on him. In Washington, Pygmy initiates Operation Havoc, which involves Pygmy releasing a bomb full of American dollars tainted with a deadly neurotoxin that he plans to spread across the country, killing millions. When his sister arrives to sabotage the project, Pygmy stops her and is attacked by another agent posing as an elderly woman. Pygmy decides to not detonate the bomb to save his sisters life, causing the other operatives to attack him. Pygmy is rescued by his brother, to whom he taught several of his deadly moves and Operative Magda. The bomb goes off but Pygmy reveals that he never tainted the money, effectively rescuing everyone at the science fair.

In the end, Pygmy resigns from his home country and prepares to integrate into American society. The father is released from prison following a near outbreak of an unknown bacterium and the other operatives are blamed for the would be terrorist attack as Pygmy learns Operative Magda was impregnated by his host brother, not the local pastor which he believed before. Pygmy concludes his final report to his country by claiming he is starting his new life.

== Characters ==
- Pygmy - The protagonist and narrator of the novel, Pygmy is a foreign operative/terrorist sent to the United States under the guise of a cultural exchange program. Since four years of age, Pygmy and his fellow operatives have been isolated from their families and "adopted by the state". They have undergone a highly rigorous training program to become elite soldiers and spies. While the state is highly successful in building Pygmy's fellow operatives into mindless drones, it seems Pygmy continues to foster a spark of self-awareness which develops throughout the novel, eventually developing into human emotions. Ironically, Pygmy becomes a national hero at one point when he saves the lives of many classmates during a school shooting, an event which further jars Pygmy's perception of his motives.
- Cat Sister - Pygmy's nickname for his host sister (other than the operatives, few people's real names are revealed). Pygmy's host sister is shown to be a highly cynical, beautiful girl whose hobbies include electrical engineering. Pygmy is attracted to her from the moment he meets her, eventually developing into a strong love for her. It is "Cat Sister" who eventually causes Pygmy to realize his own humanity, and betray his homeland to save her life. She often sneaks into her father's highly secure work place to steal basic office supplies, having perfected the practice enough to refer to herself as a spy.
- Pig Dog Brother - Pygmy's nickname for his host brother, who is portrayed as an immature preteen. At first, the host brother is hostile to Pygmy's arrival, sarcastically taking advantage of the foreigner's lack of understanding of American culture. Pygmy, however, defends "Pig Dog Brother" from the school bully, Trevor Stonefield, on the first day of his arrival in the U.S. Eventually the relationship between the two grows into almost a friendship, with Pygmy even teaching his host brother several of his lethal martial arts moves.
- Donald Cedar (Cow Father) - Pygmy's host father, an overweight stereotypical Midwesterner who does top-secret work for a government contractor. Donald also volunteers as a junior pastor at the local church, delivering comically nationalistic, jingoist sermons.
- Chicken Mother - Pygmy's host mother, Chicken Mother is described as such by Pygmy due to her bony, lanky physique. Chicken Mother is a nymphomaniac who frequently steals batteries from various electronics around the house to feed her addiction to vibrators, of which she is revealed to have a large collection.
- Trevor Stonefield - A sadistic bully who in the beginning of the novel is seen harassing Pygmy's host brother at the local Wal-Mart, causing Pygmy to follow Trevor into the public restroom and savagely beat and rape him. From then on, Trevor continues to threaten retribution on Pygmy, until it is revealed by Trevor, at gun point, that his rape led him to realize his own homosexuality, and that he is now falling for Pygmy. Pygmy, who has no concept of homosexuality, attributes this to Stockholm syndrome. This continued rejection eventually leads Trevor to massacre several students during a Model UN Conference, forcing Pygmy to kill him and thus save countless lives. A forensic autopsy reveals Trevor had been sexually assaulted, leading to the arrest of his innocent father. Prior to his school shooting, Trevor wrote a letter confessing his love for Pygmy, thereby implicating him in his rape; however, Pygmy is able to obtain the letter before it can be released.
- Magda - One of the operative/terrorists sent to the United States along with Pygmy, and the only one of the operatives given significant attention and personality throughout the novel. Magda was designated back in their homeland to the permanent life partner/wife of Pygmy and procreate children together to be of future use to the state. She attacks and injures the local pastor administering her Baptism during the ceremony. When Magda later gets pregnant, Pygmy assumes the father to be the local "dirty" pastor whom she attacked, and he retaliates accordingly.

== Style ==
Pygmy is an epistolary novel. Each chapter is a dispatch from the main character, Pygmy, writing as Agent Number 67, presumably to his home country's government. The book uses incorrect grammar, mostly comical "Engrish", written in a detached, scientific tone. Pygmy lambasts American culture and society through its comically biased first person narrative, often with humorous effects. As with many other Palahniuk novels, there are numerous small themes woven throughout the novel. Palahniuk has called these recurring themes the "chorus" in Pygmy; he talks about the fighting moves that Agent Number 67 can use to kill a man in one punch or kick, the frequent recitations of elements of the periodic table, and numerous quotes from historical dictators, politicians, generals, and philosophers.

== Reception ==
Kirkus Reviews gave a positive review, calling the novel "stylistically exhilirating" and "occasionally hilarious". The Guardian commented that the novel had "often quite funny overkill" and a "casually exiguous plot". Doug Johnstone, writing for The Independent, gave a mixed review, criticizing the inconsistencies of the plot, the narration, finale, but praising the humor, and concluded: "Ultimately, Pygmy feels a little light on content and themes. It's undoubtedly entertaining for the most part, and often pretty funny, but you get the feeling that the convoluted style is only really serving to obfuscate a lack of new ideas and subject matter."
