= Rant (novel) =

2007 book by Chuck Palahniuk

Rant: An Oral Biography of Buster Casey
- First edition cover
- Author: Chuck Palahniuk
- Cover artist: Rodrigo Corral; Jacob Magraw-Mickelson
- Language: English
- Genre: Science fiction, satire, horror
- Publisher: Doubleday
- Publication date: May 1, 2007
- Publication place: United States
- Media type: Print (hardcover, paperback); e-book
- Pages: 319
- ISBN: 978-0-385-51787-4
- OCLC: 71322095
- Dewey Decimal: 813/.54 22
- LC Class: PS3566.A4554 R36 2007

Rant: An Oral Biography of Buster Casey is a novel by Chuck Palahniuk released on May 1, 2007. Palahniuk has indicated that Rant is the first in what will become a three-book series.

Rant is told in the form of an oral biography. When the story begins, the reader discovers that the main character, Buster Landru "Rant" Casey, is already deceased. Throughout the book various people discuss their memories of Buster and the world he lived in, presenting stories in an occasionally conflicting timeline.

The paperback edition became a national bestseller in May 2008 and remained on the New York Times Paperback Fiction Bestseller List for six weeks.

Author and anthropologist Victor Turner is briefly quoted as one of the contributors.

== Plot summary ==
The novel is presented as a series of interviews in which various people recall their experiences with a man called Rant.

Buster Casey is born in the rural town of Middleton with the senses of smell and taste far more advanced than other humans. He acquires the nickname Rant from a childhood prank involving animal organs which results in numerous people becoming ill. The sound of the victims vomiting resembles the word rant, which becomes a local synonym for vomit and therefore Buster's nickname.

As a child, Rant discovers a massive wealth that turns the small town's economy on its head. He becomes obsessed with getting bitten by rabid animals along with venomous snakes and spiders. After his first bite from a black widow spider, Rant discovers that toxic spider bites cause him to get an erection. He uses this effect to leave school and eventually threatens his way to an early diploma and a rather large check that he uses to leave town. When Rant arrives in the city, it becomes clear to the reader that the novel takes place in a dystopian future, where urban dwellers are forcefully divided by curfew into two separate classes: the respectable Daytimers and the oppressed Nighttimers.

Rant becomes a Nighttimer and finds himself swept up in the Nighttimer lifestyle that revolves around "Party Crashing", a covert demolition derby played out on city streets at night. The game is organized by an unknown entity and is set during a designated window of time. The object of the game is to crash, not too forcefully, into other players who sport a certain "flag", such as a Christmas tree on their car's roof or the words "Just Married" scrawled on their vehicle's rear windshield. Rant meets Echo Lawrence, a fellow Crasher. She and Rant fall in love. Rant starts a nationwide rabies epidemic that eventually erupts into zombie-invasion-like proportions that calls for those infected with rabies to be shot and killed on sight.

Rant eventually dies during a Party Crashing event. His death is viewed and listened to by millions on national television and the Graphic Traffic radio show. However, when the car is pried open, his body is missing. After his "death", many interviewees share their speculations about Rant's strange fate and its implications for society along with the rabies outbreak.

Some interviewees and friends of Rant speculate that crashing a car while in a given state of mind will jar a person outside of time. Once this is accomplished, they can then go back and kill off all of their ancestors, in turn making them immortal. Or they can, through incest, make themselves into something more than human. The latter is believed to have happened to Green Taylor Simms, a fellow Party Crasher, who is implied to be Buster Casey in some form.

== Film adaptation ==
On September 11, 2014, Palahniuk announced that James Franco had optioned the film rights to Rant.
