= This Salzburg =

Guide book for people visiting Salzburg, Austria

This Salzburg: Being an incomplete introduction to the beauty and charm of a town we love
- Title page for This Salzburg (1938)
- Author: Count Ferdinand Czernin von und zu Chudenitz
- Illustrator: Count Eugen Ledebur
- Language: English
- Genre: Guidebook
- Publisher: Peter Davies
- Publication date: 1937
- Publication place: United Kingdom

This Salzburg is a guide book for people visiting Salzburg. It contains text by Count Ferdinand Czernin von und zu Chudenitz and drawings by Count Eugen Ledebur.

== Full title and editions ==
This Salzburg: Being an incomplete introduction to the beauty and charm of a town we love was published in Austria and in England.

1937 – London: Peter Davies, xvi + 181 pp. (first edition).

1938 – New York: The Greystone Press, xvi + 181 pp. The first American edition was bound in fabric taken from a traditional Dirndl.

[...]

1949 – Vienna: Frick, xvi + 181 pp. (fourth edition)

1951 – Vienna: Frick, xvi + 181 pp. (fifth edition)

== Author ==
Count Ferdinand Czernin was an Austrian aristocrat; his father was Ottokar Czernin, an experienced diplomat and foreign minister during World War I. Opposed to National Socialism early on, Ferdinand was associated with the Free Austrian Movement during World War II. He was an Austrian patriot, but not a nationalist, arguing that Austria had no genuine tradition of jingoistic nationalistism; what little of it there was, had been a result to distinguish Austrians from Germans during the 1930s. In a stance rare among aristocratic conservatives, he criticized the Roman Catholic Church for being anti-Semitic and slow to oppose Nazism.

== Illustrator ==
Count Eugen Ledebur was related to the author through his grandmother, she was born into the Czernin family and later married Count Johann Ledebur-Wicheln. They were cousins.

== Content ==
The book contains twenty-one unnumbered chapters. The page numbers below are taken from the first edition.

Dedication (ix): The book is dedicated to Albert, Count of Saint-Julien-Wallsee (1889–1936), who died while Czernin was writing the book.

Apology (xi): The author apologizes facetiously to all people named in the book; he suggests true remorse, on the other hand, for those he neglected to mention.

Introduction (xiii-xiv): The recommended manner of reading and thinking about Salzburg – at least while reading this book – is to do so with humor. There is a veiled reference to other nations (perhaps Germany?) not being able to do so.

Why Salzburg? (xv-xvi): If it is the month of August, the author suggests, there is nowhere else to go but Salzburg. The book is written for people who either plan to visit, or enjoyed a past visit and wish to refresh their memories.

We Austrians (1-6): Czernin, himself the member of a once-powerful dynasty, does a riff on contemporary Austrian culture, noting the idiosyncrasies of the "national character." Many Austrians, he claims, are preoccupied with having once been a grand empire and now being citizens of a rather small country. The author alludes to economic problems and the fact that many tourists would be wealthier than the locals. He also satirizes clichés about Austrians being "one with nature."

How to go about getting to Salzburg (7-14): Referencing the notorious shortage of hotel rooms during the Festival, Czernin writes humorously about sending deprecatory letters to hotels and inns, including bribes from and photographs of the applicants, in order to acquire lodgings. He notes that most guests don't even know that Salzburg is not a part of the Tyrol, but its own county.

No advice as to where to stay (15-17): In keeping with his nonchalant style, the author refuses to provide a tour guide in the conventional sense. This chapter closes with an anecdote about King Edward VIII (he had not yet abdicated) and Marlene Dietrich.

Taking a house and being a P.G. (18-25): This chapter portrays Salzburg's thriving real estate market during the month of the festival. The abbreviation P.G. means "paying guest." Since many Salzburgians rented out rooms or even aristocratic manors, this chapter also goes into dealing with the landlord, who may indeed be a Gräfin (countess).

Living up to Salzburg (26-29): Since many visitors bought Tyrolean clothes upon arriving, Czernin insists that is it not necessary in order to be accepted. One does, however, need to learn how to order coffee with the correct vocabulary in Salzburg's cafés. Nor is being very wealthy a necessity for being accepted by Salzburgians.

That Salzburg dress question (30-40): Noting that women are expected to wear Dirndls and men Lederhosen, the author mentions the most fashionable places to purchase them. Evenings, however, are reserved for formal dress from Europe's haute couture.

That Salzburg atmosphere (41-43): This short chapter asserts a change in the city's ambience in the ten years before publication; the Salzburg Festival is made accountable for it.

A short cut through Salzburg history (44-57): A light panorama of the city's long history that dates back to the pagan Roman Empire. In a humorous assertion made for his English audience, Czernin notes that after the Roman phase, nothing much happened until "the English" rediscovered Salzburg. He is referring to the monk and missionary Wynfreth (also known as St. Boniface) in the seventh century.

A short lecture on architecture (58-73): Spanning the epochs from the Middle Ages to contemporary twentieth-century architecture, Czernin makes pithy characterizations of each school and points out highlights in Salzburg from every one of them. While not a fan of modern architecture, he does claim that Clemens Holzmeister's theater buildings are "interesting" and he praises the crucifix in the College of St. Benedict near St. Peter's Archabbey.

Who is this fellow Mozart? (74-80): Here the author uses a markedly critical tone, and admits at the end of the chapter that he has written it only because Wolfgang Amadeus Mozart has become such a staple of the Austrian tourism industry. Czernin recounts the various difficulties Mozart had with his employers, the various job offers he turned down, his flighty manner, romantic escapades, and remarkable genius.

A few pertinent remarks on the subject of the Salzburg Festival (81–98): It begins as a serious history of the festival and its beginnings, even before the first Jedermann in 1920, but the chapter soon veers off into comical statements, like Goethe having written Faust "for Reinhardt" (90).

Strolling through Salzburg (99–124): The author leads the reader on an imagined tour through several cafés and bars, among them the Österreichische Hof, the Café Bazaar, and the Savoy Bar. The walk is not limited to eating and drinking; Czernin leads his companion to the cemetery next to St. Peter's and notes that the place seems like a very good spot to await the Day of judgement.

A short chapter on sport (125–137): Not actually being interested in physical exertion, the author recounts motoring, hunting, and the chase for festival tickets as the sports he is most familiar with.

Losing money and liking it (138-142): At the time of publication, gambling and casinos were legal and popular in Salzburg. Czernin is particularly interested in describing a gambling locale on the Mönchsberg, in the Mirabell Hotel.

Salzburg surroundings (143-150): A recommendation to make excursions to the Gaisberg (ideally for the sunrise after a long night), Hellbrunn Palace, Leopoldskron Palace, several lakes (Mondsee, Attersee, Mattsee, Wolfgangsee), and resorts (Berchtesgaden, Bad Ischl).

Salzburg personalities (151-160): This chapter is mainly devoted to Max Reinhardt and Helene Thimig; Arturo Toscanini comes in at third place, and then a dozen performers and society figures are mentioned in passing.

Don'ts in Salzburg (161-164): Humorously noting that wearing Tyrolese clothes won't make anyone think you are a native, this chapter gives a list of other things to avoid: Don't forget your umbrella, don't disturb Max Reinhardt before noon (mornings being the only time he sleeps), don't claim to know a lot of Austrian aristocrats, don't pretend to have understood Goethe's Faust.

A short Salzburg dictionary (165-181): The appendix lists and defines the names of persons (usually performing artists famous at the time), places (usually for eating, drinking, or playing), and things (like "atmosphere" and "beer").

Goodbye (182): Acknowledging that his book is "absurd" and "idiotic," Czernin nonetheless hopes that readers have enjoyed it.

== Reception ==
Kirkus Reviews called it "a lighthearted, casual guide" and noted that it provided a mixture of cultural background, gossip and insider details about the Salzburg Festival. The review concluded that although the books was not "a serious how-to-do-book," still, it was "helpful." The Washington Post reviewed the first edition, calling it "a must für anyone has been to Salzburg," extending the recommendation to those making plans to visit the city, or even imagining a trip there. Malcolm la Prade reviewed the first American edition, praising it as a "lively and entertaining description" of a city many Americans had visited in the past and were planning to visit that summer. He especially mentioned the dirndl cover and the Ledeburg drawings as successes. Even 40 years after its publication, in 1978, Diana Burgwyn mentioned Czernin's book in her own book for tourists titled Salzburg: a portrait.

== Other works by Czernin ==
In another collaboration with Count Eugen Ledebur as illustrator, Czernin published a short book (183 pp.) about hunting called Jagdfibel in 1938.

A year later, Czernin published Europe going going gone! A sketchy book trying to give a rough explanation of Europe, its politics, and its state of mind, for the benefit mainly of Anglo-Saxons, politicians, and other folks with uncomplicated minds (London: Peter Davies 1939) xx + 310 pp. Walter Goetz provided the illustrations "to make things easier," as the subtitle states. The book is a collection of verbal and graphic sketches of several European cultures. It was written shortly after the German annexation of Austria and during Hitler's rise to international popularity. The reviewer Meston called it "a wise and thought-provoking book," noting that Czernin made no secret of his Austrian patriotism and his severe criticism of National Socialism, summing up that "the conclusion is grave and ominous." Czernin also published a book titled My country: Austria.

"Incident in Vienna" was published in the magazine Coronet in March 1940. Capricorn Books re-issued Czernin's Versailles, 1919 in 1964. Kaiser published Die Friedensstifter: Männer und Mächte um den Versailler Vertrag which translates as The Peacemakers: Men and Powers Behind the Treaty of Versailles, in 1968.
