= Unforgettable Places to See Before You Die =

Unforgettable Places to See Before You Die is a travel book written and photographed by Steve Davey, with additional photography by Marc Schlossman. It features 40 sites, including both places of natural beauty and historical importance all over the world, and in all but one of the continents. (Europe: 7, Asia: 14, Australasia and Oceania: 3, Africa: 6, North America: 5, South America: 5). The United States, India and China are the most featured countries with a total of three sites featured each. It is notable for including the best of places in various categories, e.g. the world's greatest desert, rainforest, tropical island etc.

== The list ==
- Angkor Wat, Cambodia
- St Petersburg, Russia
- Havana, Cuba
- Wat Phra Kaeo, Bangkok, Thailand
- Grand Canyon, Arizona, United States
- Taj Mahal, Agra, India
- Eilean Donan Castle, Scotland, United Kingdom
- The Alhambra, Granada, Spain
- Aitutaki, Cook Islands
- Pyramid of Kukulcán, Mexico
- Venice, Italy
- Dead Vlei, Namibia
- Iguassu Falls, Brazil and Argentina
- Petra, Jordan
- College Fjord, Alaska, United States
- Karnak Temple, Luxor, Egypt
- Rio de Janeiro, Brazil
- Taman Negara Rainforest, Malaysia
- Jaisalmer Fort, India
- Galápagos Islands, Ecuador
- Manhattan Island, New York, United States
- Lake Titicaca, Bolivia and Peru
- Monet's Garden, Giverny, France
- Ngorongoro Crater, Tanzania
- Santorini, Greece
- Drakensberg, South Africa
- Zanzibar, Tanzania
- Makalu, Himalayas, Nepal
- Great Barrier Reef, Australia
- Lhasa, Tibet
- Yangshuo, Gulin, China
- Dubrovnik, Croatia
- Ephesus, Turkey
- The Bund, Shanghai, China
- Samarkand, Uzbekistan
- Killary Harbour, Ireland
- Uluru, Australia
- Lalibela, Ethiopia
