= Survivor (Palahniuk novel) =

1999 novel by Chuck Palahniuk

- First edition
- Author: Chuck Palahniuk
- Cover artist: Rodrigo Corral
- Language: English
- Genre: Satire, Dark comedy
- Publisher: W. W. Norton
- Publication date: February 17, 1999
- Publication place: United States
- Media type: Print (Hardcover)
- Pages: 304
- ISBN: 0-393-04702-4
- OCLC: 39323107
- Dewey Decimal: 813/.54 21
- LC Class: PS3566.A4554 S87 1999

Survivor is a satirical novel by Chuck Palahniuk, first published in February 1999. The book tells the story of Tender Branson, a member of the Creedish Church, a death cult. The chapters and pages are numbered backwards in the book, beginning with Chapter 47 on page 289 and ending with page 1 of Chapter 1.

== Plot overview ==
In the book, every member of the Creedish Cult learns how to be a servant for the human race—most of them are butlers and maids—and fear most human pleasures. They await a sign from a higher power to tell them to deliver themselves unto Them; that is, they must commit suicide.

The sign finally comes, and a good ten years later, Tender becomes the last surviving member of the cult. He is thrown into mainstream culture and becomes a personal icon for many people.

== Plot summary ==
The novel opens in medias res to Tender Branson, who has just hijacked an airliner, released its passengers, and is now sitting in the cockpit telling his life story to the cockpit voice recorder. He explains the events leading up to the hijacking.

Tender is a member of the Creedish Church, a cult which engaged in a mass suicide ten years previously. Surviving members of the cult have been steadily killing themselves since the mass suicide, in keeping with their belief that deliverance is at hand. At his dingy apartment, Tender receives telephone calls from people who want to kill themselves—the result of a newspaper misprint which printed his phone number as the number for a crisis hotline. One of these callers is Trevor Hollis, a man who wants to kill himself because of his recurring nightmares about disasters. Tender tells Trevor to kill himself, and soon after, reads his obituary in the paper. One day, Tender visits Trevor's grave and meets his sister, Fertility. Later that night, Tender has a weekly meeting with his caseworker from a government agency that keeps tabs on the survivors of suicide cults.

After their meeting, Fertility calls Tender thinking she has called the crisis hotline. Realizing who she is, Tender talks to her in a fake voice. Eventually, Fertility asks Tender to have phone sex with her, but he hangs up after turning her down. He then stops answering his phone in fear that she will be on the other line, growing more attracted to him as a mysterious voice than as a person. Later, Tender receives a suspicious call from a man he recognizes as a member of the Creedish Church, and soon realizes that the murderer of Creedish survivors is actually Creedish himself. While Tender is on a date with Fertility, a stranger approaches them on a bus and tells them facile jokes about the mass suicide. Tender recognizes the man's pants as Creedish dress and realizes he is Adam, his fraternal twin brother. Tender speaks Adam's name aloud, but when Adam asks if they are brothers, he desperately denies it.

Tender soon learns that he and Adam are the last two survivors of the Creedish Church. He begins receiving phone calls from journalists and publicity agents wanting his story. Tender's caseworker suffocates on a chemical solution of ammonia and chlorine that she was using to clean his fireplace, which had been secretly mixed together by Adam and whose intended target was Tender. Adam steals the dead caseworker's files on the Creedish suicides. The police suspect Tender, but he claims innocence and slips away. Tender, meanwhile, calls an agent and takes a flight to New York City. There he approaches a publicity agent, whose company gives him an extensive makeover in order to turn him into a religious celebrity. Tender agrees to the procedure, as he has no will to live and desires fame only in order to have an enormous audience for when he commits suicide.

As Tender's fame grows, he is constantly waiting for the opportune moment to kill himself. Then, as his popularity starts to wane, his agent tells him that he needs to perform a miracle in order to stay famous. Fertility – who has psychic powers – tracks down Tender and gives him a prediction to make on TV that will seem like a miracle when it comes true. When it does, Tender's fame swells to even greater proportions. This cycle repeats with further predictions. Tender's agent plans an elaborate wedding for him that will take place during the Super Bowl halftime show, at which point he will make another miraculous prediction. However, when the moment comes and the police arrive to arrest him, Tender causes a riot in the stadium by predicting the outcome of the game. Tender escapes with Adam and Fertility to a Ronald McDonald House.

After traveling cross-country, Tender and Adam steal a car that Fertility foretold would be unlocked in a particular parking lot. During their journey north to Canada, Adam recounts how the leaders of the Creedish Church terrorized the children into fearing sex by forcing them to watch every time a woman went into labor. Adam believes the only way to cure Tender is for him to have sex—to reject the Church doctrine at its core. Tender resists, and as Adam recounts the details of the "mental castration", Tender loses control and crashes the car. Tender reluctantly acquiesces to Adam's demand that he disfigure him with a rock, as long as Adam will tell him when to stop, but Adam keeps telling him to swing again until he dies. Immediately afterwards, Fertility shows up in a taxicab and takes Tender away.

Tender and Fertility travel to Oregon, where she plans to go on a quick job assignment as a surrogate mother to make some money; however, Fertility is actually barren, so her job is, in essence, prostitution. The job she takes coincidentally happens to be the employers from Tender's former job as a housekeeper. After dark, Tender sneaks into the house and has sex with Fertility in the guest bedroom. She informs him the next morning that she is pregnant, then leaves to board a plane to Sydney. In her planner that she leaves behind, Tender reads that someone is going to hijack the plane and crash it into the Australian outback. Following Fertility to the airport, Tender finds her, takes a gun belonging to Adam, and uses it to board the plane. He then begins searching for the "real" hijacker until the joke dawns on him and he realizes that he is the hijacker. The plot thus returns to the beginning, with Tender explaining that Fertility told him there was a way for him to escape the plane before it crashes, but on the record, he can't seem to figure it out.

The book ends mid-sentence, but without any definitive answer as to whether Tender lives or dies. However, it has been stated by the author that Tender survives; an explanation is available on Chuck Palahniuk's official website. In this explanation, Tender's death is faked: he has actually recorded a speech (equivalent to the last chapter) on a compact cassette recorder and started playing the recording to the black box before bailing out of the plane to rejoin Fertility; he did not go down with the plane.

== Characters ==
Tender Branson
The protagonist. By the end of the novel, he is the last surviving member of the Creedish Church/cult. At the beginning of the story, he works as a servant for a rich couple. He has been trained by the Creedish to be a menial laborer (i.e. a missionary of the Church), but he is bored with his existence and disillusioned with his faith. As the novel progresses, he becomes a religious celebrity and is credited for ideas and predictions that aren't really his. By the end of the story, he is wrongly believed to be a mass murderer. His story is recounted as an autobiography spoken into the black box of a plane he has hijacked and which is due to crash in just a few hours. Palahniuk has stated that he survives at the end of the novel by recording the last few minutes before the plane goes down and placing the recording beside the black box, all the while parachuting to safety, thus faking his own death.
Fertility Hollis
A friend of Tender's. She meets him at her dead brother Trevor's crypt. At first, Fertility says she is repulsed by him, but as the novel progresses the two grow close. "Fertility" is not her real name but a pseudonym she uses for her job, which is acting as a surrogate mother for couples who cannot conceive. Her job is fraudulent in that she is actually sterile and has never managed to carry a child for a client. Fertility has the psychic ability to predict the future; she knows when, where, how, and to whom everything is going to happen, which takes all the fun out of life for her. She strikes up a friendship with Tender and helps him throughout the novel because she believes he is the only person who can surprise her. It is Fertility who leads Tender to hijack the plane. She also tells him that there is a way for him to "survive", but her meaning is ambiguous.
The Caseworker
Tender's caseworker from the Suicide Retention Program. Her name is not given because Tender does not want to get her into trouble. She is assigned to him after the Creedish mass suicide, and generally leads a disappointing, unfulfilled life. Over the years, the caseworker diagnoses Tender with innumerable mental disorders from the Diagnostic and Statistical Manual of Mental Disorders (abbreviated "DSM"). One day, she helps Tender clean the house of his employers. She becomes obsessed with cleaning to the point that she virtually takes over Tender's job, even though she isn't very good at it. The caseworker eventually dies by inhaling chlorine gas created from an ammonia and bleach mixture made by Tender's brother Adam, who intended the gas for Tender.
The Agent
Tender's publicity agent. His name is also not given. The agent is the brains behind Tender's popularity. He comes up with the ideas that Tender is credited for, such as his autobiography, the "Book of Very Common Prayer", and the Tender Branson Sensitive Materials Sanitary Landfill. He is also responsible for Tender's physical transformation, claiming that no one wants to listen to a fat messiah. He also believes that the key to Tender's success is to get as much publicity as possible. The agent dies from inhaling the same poisonous gas that killed Tender's caseworker, also attributable to Adam.
Adam Branson
Adam is Tender's older twin brother. Because he was the firstborn, Adam got to stay in the Church community in Nebraska and marry, while Tender was among those sent to earn a living for the Church in the outside world. Adam is the person who leaked the community's illegal activities to the police ten years prior to the start of the novel, which was the event that instigated the community's mass suicide. Since then, Adam has been traveling the country, killing surviving members of the Church and masking the murders as suicides in order to motivate further suicides. His motivations are unclear. His goal seems to be to completely eradicate the Creedish beliefs and challenge the Church at its core. He also may see his actions as merciful to the victims of the cult brainwashing. In the course of the novel, he also kills the caseworker and the agent, making Tender the prime suspect in both murders. Adam and Fertility help Tender escape from the police as they come to arrest him, and as the brothers travel north in hiding, they return to the Creedish Church Compound, which is now the Sensitive Materials Sanitary Landfill. As they argue over their memories of the Creedish way of life, Tender crashes the car, which sends a dashboard figurine (of Tender) into Adam's eye. Adam forces Tender to beat him with a rock, thereby killing him.

== Film adaptation ==
In 1999, 20th Century Fox optioned the novel. Jake Paltrow wrote a screenplay but the project was dropped after the September 11 attacks occurred. The project was in development at production company Thousand Words to be written by Albert Torres and directed by Francis Lawrence. In 2003, Palahniuk said Trent Reznor had asked to do the music for Survivor, adding "if it ever becomes a movie – which I doubt."

In December 2025, the film was revived with a new adaptation being directed by Daniel Brown. Filming is scheduled for early 2026 in Auckland, New Zealand.

== Editions ==
- ISBN 0-393-04702-4 (hardcover, 1999)
- ISBN 0-385-49872-1 (paperback, 2000)
