= Burnt Tongues =

Literature collection published in 2014

- Editor: Chuck Palahniuk, Richard Thomas, and Dennis Widmyer
- Language: English
- Genre: Horror, transgressive fiction
- Publisher: Medallion Press
- Publication date: August 12, 2014
- Publication place: United States
- Media type: Print (paperback)
- Pages: 329
- ISBN: 978-160542734-8

Burnt Tongues is a collection of transgressive fiction stories written by multiple authors, edited by Chuck Palahniuk, Richard Thomas, and Dennis Widmyer. 72 stories were submitted to the fan-made Palahniuk website "The Cult," and then put through a vetting process. Palahniuk then selected and edited 20 of these for publication in the collection along with writing an introduction for the collection named "The Power of Persisting: An Introduction."

== Narratives ==
Author	Story	Description
Neil Krolicki	"Live This Down"	After suffering humiliation and bullying, three high-school girls plan to commit suicide by following a Japanese guide on the internet.
Chris Lewis Carter	"Charlie"	A man comes into a veterinarian clinic late at night, holding a battered and tortured cat in his arms. The vet who helps him recognizes the animal, and in a moment of comeuppance confesses something horrible he did to a cat in his childhood.
Gayle Towell	"Paper"	A woman imagines a stick-figure on the edge of a toilet paper roll and relates the image to her personal life.
Tony Liebhard	"Mating Calls"	A college student retrieves a lost phone while studying for his vet school midterm.
Michael De Vito, Jr.	"Melody"	Dougie, a mentally disabled man who lives above his parents, obsesses about a young woman who works in a convenience store across the street.
Tyler Jones	"F for Fake"	Twice-divorced Earl, miserable from his failed writing career and job, pretends himself to be the famous, reclusive author Don Swanstrom.
Phil Jourdan	"Mind and Soldier"	A disabled Vietnam veteran with schizophrenia gives advice on crushes to his young neighbor.
Richard Lemmer	"Ingredients"	A supermarket employee plays "The Game," a dangerous, urban legend-like activity that ultimately renders her infertile.
Amanda Gowin	"The Line Forms On the Right"	A man follows a mysterious woman down an alleyway and they share drinks in a bar.
Matt Egan	"A Vodka Kind of Girl"	A teenager dies from congenital heart failure, aggravated by bulimia.
Fred Venturini	"Gasoline"	A disfigured man learns that the boy he had lied about setting him on fire hanged himself in his jail cell, and recalls what led up to the lie.
Brandon Tietz	"Dietary"	An obese ex-homecoming queen goes to extreme lengths to gain her figure back in time for her reunion.
Adam Skorupskas	"Invisible Graffiti"	A man encounters an overdosed, armless junkie in an abandoned building and takes her under his care.
Bryan Howie	"Bike"	A father gives his son's bicycle a new paint job. The ending is left ambiguous.
Brien Piechos	"Heavier Petting"	While at a strip club, the narrator tells a rather graphic urban legend about a teenage girl having drugged, drunken sex with a dog, and a meditation on bestiality and the nature of storytelling.
Jason M. Fylon	"Engines, O-rings, and Astronauts"	After enduring a ruthless beating, an outcast boy kills his teacher and several of his classmates. Told from the perspective of a survivor many years later.
Terence James Eeles	"Lemming"	On Halloween, a man tracks down his twin brother causing a rash of suicides across the world. The title comes from the legend of lemmings' ritual suicide.
Keith Bule	"Routine"	A depressed, insomniac pharmacist finishes his last night shift routine.
Gus Moreno	"Survived"	Following his grandfather's death, a young boy witnesses an electrician collapse in his grandmother's apartment due to heat stroke.
Daniel W. Broallt	"Zombie Whorehouse"	In a post-apocalyptic world, one journalist goes undercover to expose a string of underground "zombie" sex rings.
