= Diary (novel) =

2003 novel by Chuck Palahniuk

- First edition cover
- Author: Chuck Palahniuk
- Cover artist: Rodrigo Corral; Leanne Shapton
- Language: English
- Genre: Horror, satire
- Publisher: Doubleday
- Publication date: August 26, 2003
- Publication place: United States
- Media type: Print (hardcover)
- Pages: 272
- ISBN: 0-385-50947-2
- OCLC: 51810534
- Dewey Decimal: 813/.54 21
- LC Class: PS3566.A4554 D53 2003

Diary is a 2003 novel by Chuck Palahniuk. The book is written like a diary. Its protagonist is Misty Wilmot, a once-promising young artist who works as a waitress in a hotel. Her husband, a contractor, is in a coma after a suicide attempt. According to the description on the back of Diary, Misty "soon finds herself a pawn in a larger conspiracy that threatens to cost hundreds of lives."

Diary is an example of the modern horror genre, employing psychological elements and dark humor.

The audio version of Diary is narrated by actress Martha Plimpton.

== Plot summary ==
As a "coma diary", the reader learns of Misty Marie Wilmot as her husband lies senseless in a hospital after a suicide attempt. The story is not exactly told by Misty but through a second-person perspective. Once she was an art student, dreaming of creativity and freedom, but after marrying Peter while they were both still at school and then giving birth to their daughter shortly after, she is eventually brought back to Waytansea Island. It was once quaint, but it has become overrun with tourists. Misty has been reduced to the lowly condition of a mere waitress within a common resort hotel. Peter, before falling into his coma, was building hidden rooms within the houses he was remodeling and scrawling vile messages all over the walls; this is an old habit of builders but it was dramatically overdone in Peter's case. Angry homeowners are suing Misty, and her dreams of artistic greatness have been ruined. But then, as if she was possessed by the spirit of the fabled Waytansea artist Maura Kincaid, Misty begins painting again, excessively and compulsively.

Misty discovers that the islanders, including her father-in-law (previously thought to be dead) are involved in a conspiracy which repeats every four generations. A young artist (in this case Misty) is lured to the island by an old piece of jewelry, she becomes pregnant and has her child within the community. It is implied that this old jewelry works to lure and entrap Misty because it was hers in a past life, during which these same events occur again. During middle age, her husband dies, followed by all her children, resulting in a wave of great artistic creativity, the product of which is mesmerizing to the observing audience.

The islanders create an exhibition of Misty's art work at the local hotel where a fire is started by Misty's daughter, who is revealed to be alive after a previous point in the book when she was thought to have drowned, and all the hotel's occupants are burned to death due to their being mesmerized by her painting. The result is a huge insurance claim which leaves the remaining island citizens wealthy enough to support their luxurious lifestyles for the next four generations, at which point a new young artist will be found to repeat the cycle. Peter attempted to warn her of this plot using his hidden writing, and it is revealed that his suicide attempt was in fact a murder attempt. It is never revealed whether Peter recovered from his coma, but from Misty's descriptions of his state of health, he more than likely died.

== Characters ==
The names of the main characters are taken from fans' names selected at random in an official contest held by "The Cult" on the ChuckPalaniuk.net website prior to publication.

Misty Marie Wilmot
The protagonist. Her maiden name is Kleinman. Misty was raised in a trailer park in Tecumseh Lake, Georgia by her hippie mother. She is an aspiring artist; she attends art school where she eventually meets, and begins going out with, Peter Wilmot. Peter does everything in his power to get her pregnant; they eventually go live with his family on Waytansea Island after his father, Harrow Wilmot, dies. Misty puts off her artistic aspirations to raise Tabitha. Misty eventually discovers that she is the reincarnation of past artists, including Maura Kincaid and Constance Burton.
Peter Wilmot
After moving back to Waytansea Island, Peter takes up the job of contractor. He is found in the family car by Misty, supposedly having attempted suicide. It eventually turns out that he was the victim of attempted murder by his own father, whom Misty had thought was dead and who was trying to stop him from spoiling the islanders' plan to use Misty's artwork to get rich. The murder attempt was a failure, and Peter now lies comatose in a hospital bed.
Tabitha Wilmot
Referred to throughout most of the book as Tabbi, Tabitha is the daughter of Misty and Peter. She plays the part of a loving child throughout most of the story, eventually faking her death so as to cause her mother emotional pain which would help Misty to create art. After it is revealed to Misty that Tabitha is still alive, she learns that Tabitha smokes, flirts with boys, and is not as loving, sweet, or innocent a child as she'd previously thought.
Grace Wilmot
Grace is the mother of Peter and "Granmy" to Tabitha. Misty is often annoyed by her, whether it's the way she wastes Misty's money, or the way she's influencing Tabitha. Grace is often found with a diary, which it turns out is not of Grace's writings, but rather that of a dead artist from a century back by the name of Constance Burton. Grace eventually dies in a fire in the hotel along with more than a hundred other persons on the night of the unveiling of Misty's artwork.
Harrow Wilmot
Referred to most often by the nickname Harry, Harrow was the father of Peter and husband of Grace. Misty uses him to judge in advance what Peter will eventually look like. Although Misty loved him, throughout most of the book, Misty believes he is dead, as that is what Peter, Grace, and the doctor have all told her (despite none of them telling her the same thing as his cause-of-death). Toward the end of the book, it is discovered that Harrow is actually alive, and that his death has been faked. But he dies not long after, along with Grace in the burning hotel.
Angel Delaporte
Angel is a wealthy man who comes to live on the island. He is quite interested in graphology, and he and Misty go around to the various houses in which Peter has done construction work to see what sort of messages Peter has painted on the walls of these houses. It is eventually revealed that Peter was actually bisexual and in love with Angel. Angel is killed by the island-folk, stabbed to death by Harry while he slept.
Detective Clark Stilton
Stilton is the only member of the Seaview County Hate Crimes Task Force. He is investigating the acts of an anti-tourist terrorist group known as the Ocean Alliance for Freedom (OAFF). He arrests Misty under suspicion of murder and arson. That night, he dies in the hotel fire.
Daniel Touchet, M.D.
Dr. Touchet (pron: "tü-ˈshā") is the main, if not only, doctor on the island. He has delivered most of the younger residents of the island, including Peter, Tabitha, Paulette Hyland (then Paulette Petersen), Will Tupper, Matt Hyland, and Brett Petersen. He also prepares the bodies of the dead for funeral, and performs cremations. When Misty has a migraine, she goes to Dr. Touchet, who tells her about the Jain Buddhists, the Essene Jews, and the early Christians, and gives her some capsules which he claims contain "green algae mostly, some white willow bark, [and] a little bee pollen." When Misty trips, the doctor tells her she has injured her knee and that she must stay in her room for three weeks, affording her the opportunity to paint. When Angel tries to help her escape, he tells her he had the pill tested, and that it contained powdered lead with trace amounts of arsenic and mercury, each of which are traditional ingredients in artistry paints linked to accidental self-poisoning.

=== Other characters ===
Mrs. Burton, Mrs. Seymour, and Mrs. Perry
These three islanders are referred to in Misty's diary as "local sea turtles."
Raymon
A busboy at the hotel.
Maura Kincaid and Constance Burton
Two dead artists, both female, who had come to live on Waytansea Island in much the same manner as Misty. The islanders believe that Misty is the reincarnation of these artists, as well as others, and Misty herself comes to believe this. Both Maura and Constance have left clues around the island for their future incarnations, including little messages written in the island's library books.
Mrs. Terrymore
The old librarian, who diligently erases messages from Maura and Constance when she finds them in the books.
Paulette Hyland
The desk clerk at the hotel, whose maiden name is Petersen.
Will Tupper
A friend of Peter who now is bald and runs the ferryboat between the island and the mainland. Back in college, he had blonde hair, and had ripped an earring from his ear to give to Misty. He still has scar-tissue from this incident.
The Ocean Alliance for Freedom
OAFF for short, this was the name Harrow (and possibly other islanders) gave himself when he committed murder and arson so that the police would suspect the murders and arsonry were the act of militant radical leftists, rather than an act of conspiracy with the whole island. Stilton, a member of the Seaview County Hate Crimes Task Force, is brought onto the case as it is noticed that OAFF only attacks mainlanders. On page 155, Stilton says "The white supremacy movement and the Green Party have connections going way back. It's not a long stretch from protecting nature to preserving racial purity."
Nora Adams
Nora appears on the last page of the book in a letter form. Towards the end of the book, Misty states that she and Tabbi will change their names (hence the Nora Adams) and move to Tecumseh Lake, GA. The address where the letter is sent is from Tecumseh, GA.

== Cover ==
The dust jacket of the first edition of Diary contains a hidden printed message. The inside of the jacket is printed black, with white letters printed vertically across the jacket from bottom to top, in the same style of writing as the title on the cover. They read "WHERE DO YOU GET YOUR INSPIRATION?"
