= Beautiful You (novel) =

2014 novel by Chuck Palahniuk

- First edition
- Author: Chuck Palahniuk
- Cover artist: Rodrigo Corral
- Language: English
- Genre: Satirical novel
- Publisher: Doubleday
- Publication date: July 21, 2015
- Publication place: United States
- Media type: Print (Hardcover)
- Pages: 240
- ISBN: 978-0345807113

Beautiful You is a novel by Chuck Palahniuk, released October 21, 2014. It is set in New York City and follows the main character, Penny, who finds herself the object of affection of a Digital Age tycoon named C. Linus Maxwell, known to the Manhattan elite as "Climax-well".

== Plot ==
Penny is seduced by Maxwell, the world's richest man, and unwittingly becomes the latest in a line of women he is using to experiment his high-tech line of sex toys called Beautiful You. Though these toys bring on a complete state of orgasmic bliss, once released to the public, they cause all women to lock themselves in their homes, leaving men without partners and eventually modern life in ruins.

The sex toys releases nano-bots into women to hijack their will-power in order to make them slaves to Maxwell's corporation. Maxwell then uses his wealth and influence to assert power over mankind. Penny seeks an end to this by scaling the Himalayas and finding a 200-year-old sex-witch named Baba Greybeard. Penny, along with a group of renegade women, develop a set of supernatural powers through her own sexual abilities that she uses to take Maxwell down and restore right to the world.

== Reception ==
It received negative reception from NPR where it is said to be "distasteful" and "cheap." It is additionally called "hostile" and "a massive miscalculation" especially for the grievance of featuring a rape scene at the start of the novel. The Washington Independent Review of Books notes what could have been satire is vapidness save for shock-value and sexism.
