= Bait (short story collection) =

2016 short story collection by Chuck Palahniuk

- First edition
- Author: Chuck Palahniuk
- Language: English
- Genre: Short story collection, coloring book
- Publisher: Dark Horse Books
- Publication date: 2016
- Publication place: United States
- Media type: Print

Bait: Off-Color Stories for You to Color is a 2016 short story collection and adult coloring book novel by Chuck Palahniuk.

== Overview ==
Short story collection of eight stories and original illustrations by comic book artists to color.
