= Lullaby (Palahniuk novel) =

Novel by Chuck Palahniuk

- First edition cover
- Author: Chuck Palahniuk
- Cover artist: Rodrigo Corral; Judy Manfredi
- Language: English
- Genre: Horror, satire
- Publisher: Doubleday
- Publication date: September 17, 2002
- Publication place: United States
- Media type: Print (hardcover)
- Pages: 272
- ISBN: 0-385-50447-0
- OCLC: 48871773
- Dewey Decimal: 813/.54 21
- LC Class: PS3566.A4554 L86 2002

Lullaby is a horror-satire novel by American writer Chuck Palahniuk, published in 2002. It won the 2003 Pacific Northwest Booksellers Association Award, and was nominated for the Bram Stoker Award for Best Novel in 2002.

== Plot summary ==
Newspaper reporter Carl Streator has been assigned to write articles on a series of cases of sudden infant death syndrome, from which his own child had died. Carl discovers that his wife and child had died immediately after he read them a "culling song", or African chant, from the book Poems and Rhymes Around the World. During his investigations into other SIDS cases, he finds that a copy of the book was at the scene of each death. In every case, the book was open to a page that contained the culling song. As Carl learns, the rhyme has the power to kill anyone to whom it is spoken. Because of the stress of Carl's life, the deadly rhyme becomes unusually powerful, allowing him to kill by only thinking the poem. Carl unintentionally memorizes it and semi-voluntarily becomes a serial killer who makes people die over minor annoyances.

Carl turns to Helen Hoover Boyle, a real estate agent who has also found the rhyme in the same book and knows of its destructive power. While she is unable to help him stop using the rhyme, she is willing to help him stop anyone else from being able to use it again. The two of them decide to go on a road trip across the country to find all remaining copies of the book and destroy the page containing the rhyme. They are joined by Helen's hippie assistant, Mona "Mulberry" Sabbat, and Mona's boyfriend, a nihilistic environmentalist and vegan named Oyster. Carl must not only deal with the dangers of the rhyme, but with the risk of it falling into the hands of Oyster, who may want to use it for sinister purposes.

In addition to tracking down and destroying any copy of the rhyme, the group also seek a grimoire, a hypothesized spellbook which also contains the rhyme. Carl wants to destroy it, believing that the knowledge contained in it is too dangerous, while the others in his group want to learn what other spells it contains—partly in the hope that there is a spell to resurrect the dead. The group eventually abandons Oyster on a highway after he assaults Helen in an attempt to learn the rhyme. Mona eventually realizes that the datebook Helen had been carrying throughout the trip is the grimoire they had been looking for, written in invisible ink. Helen had acquired it years earlier in the estate of the publisher of Poems and Rhymes Around the World, whom she had killed with the rhyme as revenge for the deaths of her husband and child.

Initially, Mona attempts to persuade Helen and Carl to allow her to translate the grimoire, but they are distrustful of her relationship with Oyster, leaving Mona infuriated. Helen translates the book herself. In addition to the culling song, the grimoire is found to contain other spells. Carl and Helen have a romantic moment, but Carl later is left skeptical of the relationship after Mona convinces him that Helen was using a love spell from the grimoire to control him. After confronting Helen about the accusation, Carl decides to kill Nash, a paramedic to whom he inadvertently gave knowledge of the rhyme. Nash uses the rhyme to kill beautiful models to have sex with their corpses.

After his confrontation with Nash, Carl surrenders himself to the police and is placed in a maximum security prison. Helen has used the grimoire to possess the officer's body, and she helps Carl escape. During this time, Oyster steals the grimoire (with the exception of the culling song) with help from Mona. He uses it to possess Helen and commit suicide. With her last amount of energy, Helen possesses the police sergeant and joins Carl to kill Mona and Oyster, who have been using the spells to advance their extremist views.

=== Structure ===
Lullaby uses a framing device, alternating between the normal, linear narrative and the temporal end after every few chapters. Palahniuk often uses this format alongside a major plot twist near the end of the book which relates in some way to this temporal end (what Palahniuk refers to as "the hidden gun").

Lullaby starts with Mr. Streator talking to the reader, narrating where he is today and why he is going to tell us the backstory that will give us perspective on his current situation. "Still, this isn't a story about here and now. Me, the Sarge, the Flying Virgin. Helen Hoover Boyle. What I'm writing is the story of how we met. How we got here."

This present tense information that makes this book a frame story is incorporated every few chapters as its own chapter, entirely italicized. Palahniuk uses these segments as a way to set up his "hidden gun" and as a means to foreshadow where the story is going. His present seems disconnected from the past that he narrates throughout the rest of the novel. The final chapter concludes in the present, providing the puzzle-piece that strings together all the events and makes sense out of the backstory and their current workings searching for "phenomenons."

== Background ==
In 1999, Chuck's father, Fred Palahniuk, began dating an Idaho woman named Donna Fontaine. Fontaine had recently put her ex-husband Dale Shackleford in prison for sexual abuse. Shackleford had vowed to kill Fontaine as soon as he was released. After his release, Shackleford followed Fred Palahniuk and Fontaine home from a date to her apartment in Kendrick, Idaho. After shooting Fred Palahniuk in the abdomen and Fontaine in the back of the neck, Shackleford started a fire and left them to die.

After Shackleford's arrest and prosecution for the two first degree murders, Chuck Palahniuk was asked to be part of the decision as to whether Shackleford would receive the death sentence. Palahniuk had worked in a hospital and as a crime reporter and struggled with his stance on capital punishment. Over the next few months, he began working on Lullaby. In an interview with IndieWire, he said it was a way to cope with the decision he had to make regarding Shackleford's death. In the spring of 2001, Shackleford was found guilty for two counts of murder in the first degree. A month after Palahniuk finished Lullaby, Shackleford was sentenced to death; however, his sentence was reduced to life in prison after appeal.

== Film adaptation Kickstarter campaign ==
In 2016, a Kickstarter campaign to produce an adaptation of Lullaby, to be directed by Andy Mingo with a script by Palahniuk and Mingo, raised over $400,000, but the film was never produced.

== In popular culture ==
American punk rock band Lagwagon's song "Lullaby" was inspired by this novel with nearly every phrase from the lyrics derived from the book.

British band The Bluetones's song "Culling Song" from the album A New Athens makes reference to the Culling Song from this book.

== See also ==
- 2002 in literature
- Fictional book

== Sources ==
- Palahniuk, Chuck. "FreakSpeak". The story behind Lullaby. Random House, Inc.
