= Legacy (novella) =

Novella and coloring book

- First edition
- Author: Chuck Palahniuk
- Language: English
- Genre: Novella, coloring book
- Publisher: Dark Horse Books
- Publication date: 2017
- Publication place: United States
- Media type: Print

Legacy: An Off-Color Novella for You to Color is a 2017 novella and coloring book by Chuck Palahniuk.

== Overview ==
A dark fable about aspiring immortals, an amoral banker and his despicable family, and a stalker.
