= Adjustment Day =

2018 novel by Chuck Palahniuk

- First edition
- Author: Chuck Palahniuk
- Language: English
- Genre: Satirical novel
- Publisher: W. W. Norton
- Publication date: May 1, 2018
- Publication place: United States
- Media type: Print (Hardcover)
- Pages: 336

Adjustment Day is a 2018 dystopian novel by Chuck Palahniuk.

== Synopsis ==
In a near-future United States, a corrupt Senator plans to reinstate the draft to send young men to die in a planned nuclear attack of mutually agreed-upon destruction in the Middle East to prevent an uprising of those same young men. Meanwhile, the mysterious Talbott Reynolds circulates a small blue and black book throughout the country full of his own manifesto and wisdom on how life should be lived, and a Web site called "The List" allows users to submit and vote on public figures they think deserve to be killed. Before the vote can be made to reinstate the draft, readers of Reynolds's manifesto rise up, kill the targets on The List, and use severed ears taken from those killings to prove their power and become the new leaders of a new United States, split into the regions of Blacktopia, a black nationalist nation, Gaysia, a nation where homosexuals are forced to breed, and Caucasia, a white nationalist nation.

== Reception ==
Jason Sheehan, reviewing the novel for NPR, called most of the book a "quick, horrifying descent into madness", but that Palahniuk "just can't stick the landing" and that "it ends with a whimper rather than a bang".
