= Choke (2008 film) =

2008 film by Clark Gregg

- Theatrical release poster
- Directed by: Clark Gregg
- Screenplay by: Clark Gregg
- Based on: Choke by Chuck Palahniuk
- Produced by: Beau Flynn; Tripp Vinson; Johnathan Dorfman; Temple Fennell
- Starring: Sam Rockwell; Anjelica Huston; Kelly Macdonald; Brad William Henke; Jonah Bobo
- Cinematography: Tim Orr
- Edited by: Joe Klotz
- Music by: Nathan Larson
- Production companies: ATO Pictures; Contrafilm; Aramid Entertainment Fund; Dune Entertainment III; Choke Film
- Distributed by: Fox Searchlight Pictures
- Release dates: January 21, 2008 (Sundance); September 26, 2008 (United States)
- Running time: 92 minutes
- Country: United States
- Language: English
- Budget: $3.4 million
- Box office: $4 million

Choke is a 2008 American black comedy film written and directed by Clark Gregg, based on the 2001 novel by Chuck Palahniuk. It stars Sam Rockwell and Anjelica Huston, with Kelly Macdonald, Brad William Henke, and Jonah Bobo. It tells the story of a man who works in a colonial theme park, attends sexual addiction recovery meetings, and intentionally chokes on food in upscale restaurants so his "rescuers" give him money out of sympathy and thus cover his mother's Alzheimer's disease hospital bills.

Production took place in New Jersey in 2007. Choke premiered at the 2008 Sundance Film Festival and was purchased by Fox Searchlight Pictures for distribution. It was released in select theaters in the United States on September 26, 2008, and on DVD on February 17, 2009.

== Plot ==
Victor Mancini is a sex addict who works as a reenactor of life in Colonial America with his best friend Denny, who is also a reformed sex addict. To support his hospitalized mother, Ida, Victor cons others by intentionally choking at restaurants to obtain money from his rescuers.

When Victor visits his mother one day, he meets Dr. Paige Marshall, who takes care of her. She tells Victor that his mother's condition is worsening and suggests an experimental stem cell technique that would require harvesting cells from the umbilical cord of a newborn baby with Victor's genes. She persuades Victor to have sex with her so she can have his child and save his mother.

Victor never knew his father and is anxious to obtain the information from his mother, but she never recognizes him when he visits. He asks Denny to pose as him and ask her questions. Denny agrees and reveals that Victor's mother kept a diary. Victor finds it, but it is in Italian. Paige tells Victor she can read Italian and agrees to translate the diary.

Victor and Paige try several times to have sex, but Victor cannot maintain an erection. After discussing it with Denny, Victor realizes he loves Paige. She then reveals to him that his mother may have fled Italy because she stole Jesus' foreskin and used its cells to conceive Victor, making him the Second Coming. He is reluctant to believe but, in the end, accepts Paige's assertion. However, his mother finally recognizes him and tells him that she stole him as a baby and she has no idea who his birth parents are. As she tells him this, he feeds her chocolate pudding and accidentally chokes her to death.

While Paige tries to resuscitate Victor's mother, a hidden band around her wrist falls into Victor's view, revealing that she is a patient in the hospital, not a doctor. Paige then reveals that she was admitted to the hospital years earlier, in a catatonic state, and fell in love with Victor through the stories his mother told her about him. Since she was a medical student dropout, the nurses allowed her to wear a white coat, as it calmed her down. Paige, a voluntary patient, checks herself out without saying goodbye to Victor.

After his mother's funeral, Victor boards a plane. He goes to the bathroom and the door opens to reveal Paige joining him.

== Cast ==
- Sam Rockwell as Victor Mancini, a sex addict who cons people in order to fund the care of his hospitalized mother
  - Jonah Bobo as young Victor
- Anjelica Huston as Ida J. Mancini, Victor's mother
- Kelly Macdonald as Paige Marshall
- Brad William Henke as Denny, Victor's best friend, a reformed sex addict. He is thrown out of his parents' house and becomes Victor's roommate.
- Heather Burns as Internet date / Gwen
- Paz de la Huerta as Nico
- Clark Gregg as Lord High Charlie
- Joel Grey as Phil, a member of Victor's sex addiction therapy group. Grey is the director's father-in-law.
- Viola Harris as Eva Muller
- Gillian Jacobs as Cherry Daiquiri / Beth, a stripper who falls for Denny
- Matt Malloy as Detective Foushee
- Bijou Phillips as Ursula
- Isiah Whitlock Jr. as Detective Palmer

Writer Chuck Palahniuk makes a cameo. He can be seen in the same row as Rockwell on the plane just before the film ends.

== Production ==
=== Writing ===
In April 2001, following the video and DVD success of the film adaptation of Chuck Palahniuk's book Fight Club, the author sold feature film rights to his then-unpublished book Choke to Bandeira Entertainment under producer Beau Flynn. Flynn optioned Choke on the request of actor Clark Gregg, who had received the book as a writing assignment and became fascinated with Choke's unflinching way of dealing with "the difficult topics of childhood trauma and sexual compulsion in a way that was both painful and hysterically funny". Gregg worked on the book for five years, trying to adapt it faithfully. He decided to write his personal version of the story, believing that it would be one that Chuck Palahniuk would oppose. To Gregg's surprise, the author liked and supported the departures made in Gregg's version. Gregg described the difficulty of writing the script: "It's a tricky adaptation because like a lot of Chuck's work, it operates in a heightened satirical, dark world, yet this one is one of his black romantic comedies, so getting the tone right took me some time."

=== Filming ===
Gregg was attached to film Choke in his directorial debut. Production was originally slated for 2006, but Gregg was temporarily occupied with a key role on the TV comedy series The New Adventures of Old Christine. By July 2007, Gregg cast actor Sam Rockwell in the lead role, as well as supporting cast members. Production began in the same month in New Jersey. Filming lasted 25 days with a budget of $3.4 million. Gregg had acted with Rockwell in a play, and the director believed that Rockwell would switch effortlessly between the dramatic and comedic moments in the film. A major filming location was the defunct Essex County Psychiatric Hospital in Cedar Grove. The hospital was considered a critical location by filmmakers, who believed that production would not have taken off without the discovered hospital, due to the project's minimal budget.

As opposed to dark comedies that had a sustained tone, Gregg found Choke to be more tonally complex, and that it would veer between "extremely dramatic moments" and "absurdly silly ones". The director sought to find a way to combine the two elements, drawing inspiration from the Hal Ashby films Harold and Maude (1971) and Being There (1979) and contemporary films like Secretary (2002) and Eternal Sunshine of the Spotless Mind (2004). In addition, the limited budget forced the director to consider economical measures throughout production.

The 2007 song "Reckoner" by Radiohead was used in the credits. Palahniuk said Radiohead had written an ambient soundtrack for the film, which Radiohead's management denied.

== Release ==
Choke premiered at the Sundance Film Festival on January 21, 2008, where it won a Special Jury Prize for a dramatic work by an ensemble cast. Having been positively received in its screening, the film was purchased for $5 million by Fox Searchlight Pictures for distribution outside Scandinavia, Iceland, Romania, Turkey, Portugal and the Baltics. Choke was also the closing film for the 10th Provincetown International Film Festival in Provincetown, Massachusetts, on June 22, 2008.

The film was originally scheduled for a theatrical release in the United States on August 1, 2008, but it was postponed to September 26, 2008.

== Critical response ==
On the review aggregator website Rotten Tomatoes, 56% of 143 critics' reviews are positive, with an average rating of 5.9/10. The website's consensus reads: "While bolstered by strong performances from Sam Rockwell and Anjelica Huston, Choke struggles to capture the tone of Chuck Palahniuk's novel." Metacritic, based on 27 critics' reviews, assigned the film a weighted average score of 47/100, indicating "mixed or average" reviews. In his review for The New York Times, Stephen Holden notes called it an "entertaining collection of vignettes strung together by a sarcastic loudmouth whose heart is breaking under his sophomoric bravado", praising Rockwell's performance for making the audience "see all the layers as well as feel the pain that lies beneath".
