= Chuck Palahniuk =

American novelist (born 1962)

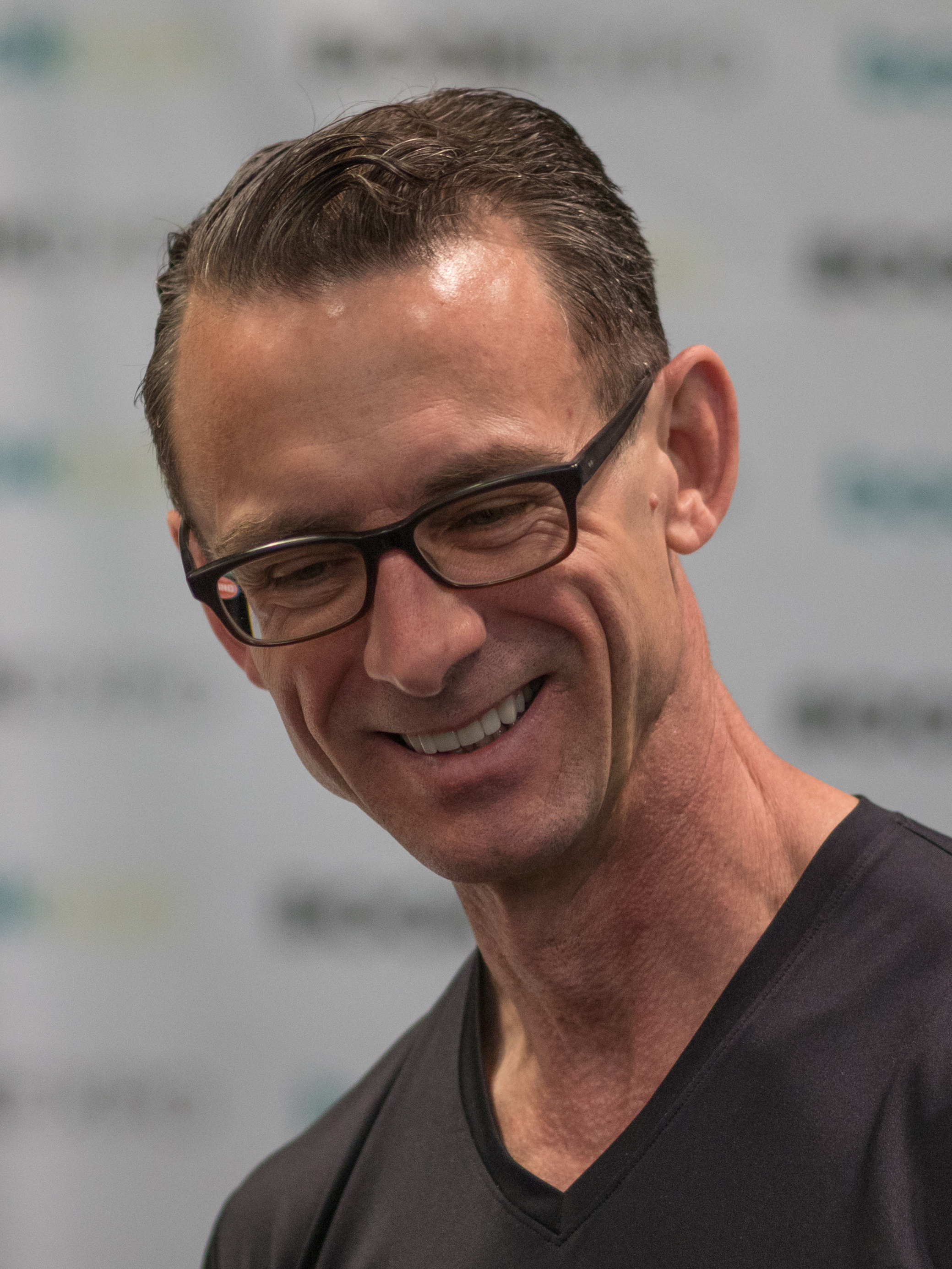
- Palahniuk in 2018
- Born: Charles Michael Palahniuk; February 21, 1962 (age 64); Pasco, Washington, U.S.
- Education: University of Oregon
- Occupations: Novelist; essayist
- Writing career
- Period: 1996–present
- Genres: Fiction; horror; satire
- Notable works: Fight Club; Choke; Rant; Invisible Monsters
- Movements: Minimalism; postmodernism
- Website: www.chuckpalahniuk.net

Signature
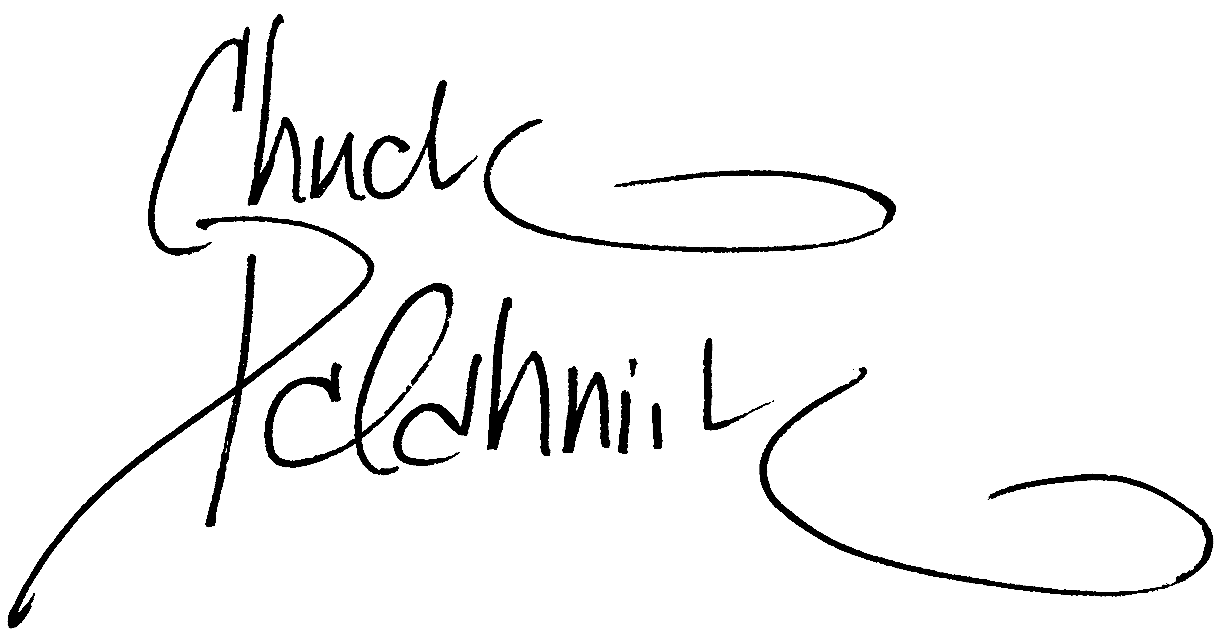

Charles Michael Palahniuk (/ˈpɔːlənɪk/; PAW-lə-nick; Ukrainian pronunciation: [pɐlɐɦˈnʲuk], born February 21, 1962) is an American novelist who describes his work as transgressive fiction. He has published 19 novels, three nonfiction books, two graphic novels, and two adult coloring books, as well as several short stories. His first published novel, Fight Club, was adapted into a film of the same title.

== Early life ==
Palahniuk was born in Pasco, Washington, the son of Carol Adele (née Tallent) and Fred Palahniuk. He has French and Ukrainian ancestry. His paternal grandfather migrated from Ukraine to Canada and then to New York in 1907.

Palahniuk grew up living in a mobile home in Burbank, Washington. His parents separated when he was 14 years old; they subsequently divorced, often leaving him and his three siblings to live with their maternal grandparents at their cattle ranch in eastern Washington. He was 18 when his parents told him that his paternal grandfather murdered his paternal grandmother.

In a 2007 interview, Palahniuk said that he is a distant relative of actor Jack Palance (né Volodymyr Palahniuk) and his daughter Holly.

Palahniuk attended the University of Oregon, graduating with a degree in journalism in 1986. As part of his coursework, he interned at the local public radio station, KLCC.

== Career ==
=== Early career ===
Palahniuk wrote for his local newspaper for a short while but then began working for Freightliner Trucks as a diesel mechanic, until gaining traction in his writing career. During that time, he wrote manuals on fixing trucks and had a stint as a journalist, a job which he did not return to until after he became a successful novelist. After attending a seminar by Landmark Education, Palahniuk quit his job as a journalist in 1988. He performed volunteer work for a homeless shelter and volunteered at a hospice as an escort, providing transportation for terminally ill people, taking them to support group meetings. He ceased volunteering upon the death of a patient to whom he grew attached.

Palahniuk began writing fiction in his early 30s. By his account, he started writing while attending workshops for writers that were hosted by Tom Spanbauer, which he attended to meet new friends. Spanbauer largely inspired Palahniuk's minimalistic writing style.

=== Fight Club ===
After his first novel – Invisible Monsters – was rejected by all publishers he submitted it to, he began work on his first published novel, Fight Club. Palahniuk wrote this story in his spare time while working for Freightliner. After initially publishing it as a short story (which became chapter 6 of the novel) in the 1995 compilation Pursuit of Happiness, Palahniuk expanded it into a full novel, which a publisher accepted.

Initially, Palahniuk struggled to find a literary agent and went without one until after the publication of Fight Club. After he began receiving attention from 20th Century Fox, Palahniuk was signed by actor and literary agent Edward Hibbert. Hibbert eventually guided and brokered the deal that took Fight Club to the big screen. In 1999, the film adaptation by director David Fincher was released.

=== Invisible Monsters, Survivor, and Choke ===
A revised version of Invisible Monsters, as well as his fourth novel, Survivor, were published in 1999. A few years later Palahniuk completed his first New York Times bestseller, the novel Choke, which later was made into a movie.

=== Lullaby ===
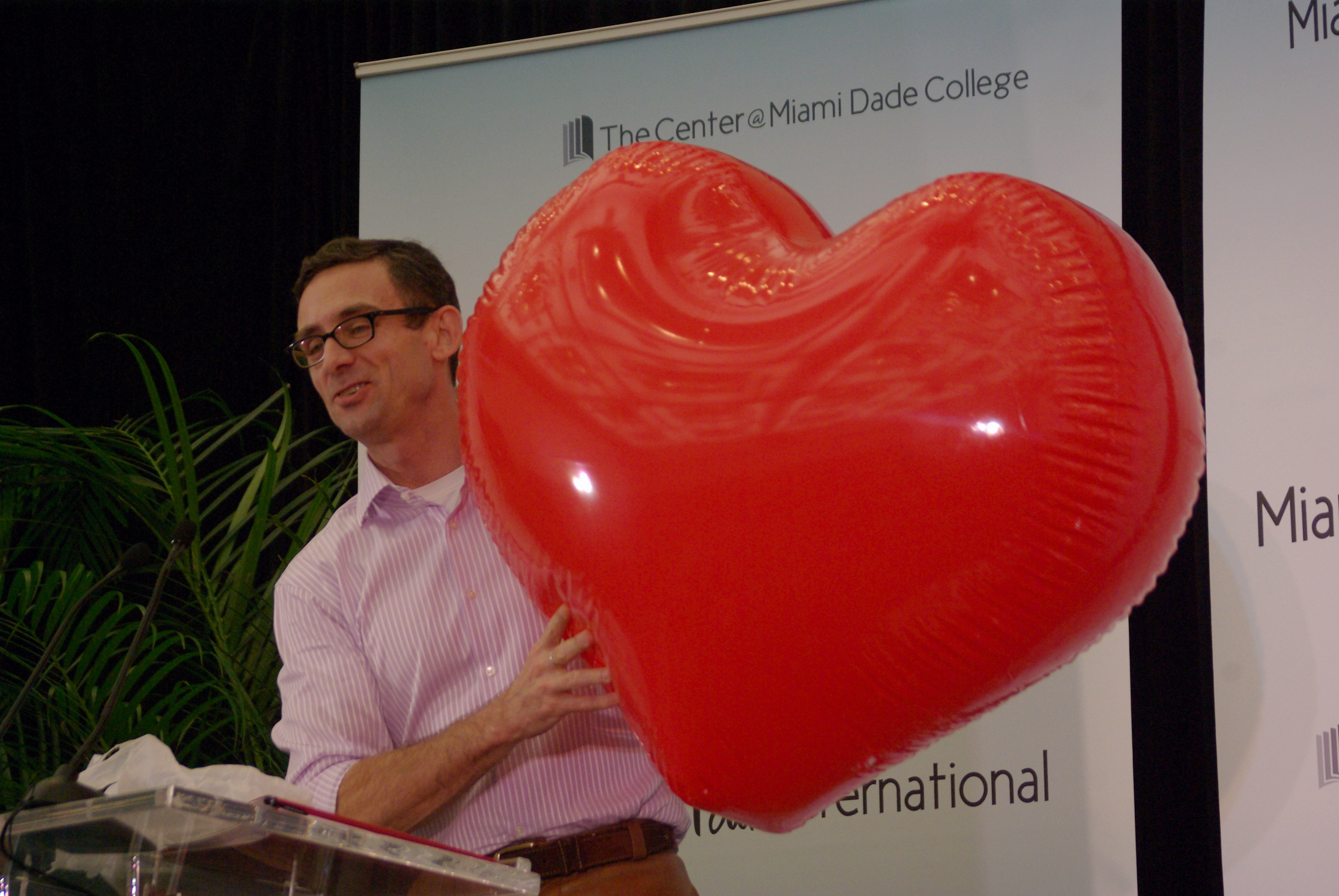
Palahniuk at the Miami Book Fair International 2011

In 1999, Palahniuk experienced multiple tragedies. At that time, his father, Fred Palahniuk, started dating a woman named Donna Fontaine, whom he met through a personal ad under the title "Kismet". Her former boyfriend, Dale Shackelford, was previously imprisoned for sexual abuse and vowed to kill Fontaine as soon as he was released from prison. Palahniuk reportedly believed that, using a personal ad, Fontaine was looking for "the biggest man she could find" to protect her from Shackelford, and Palahniuk's father qualified. After his release, Shackelford followed Fontaine and the senior Palahniuk to Fontaine's home in Kendrick, Idaho, after they went out for a date. Shackelford then shot them both and dragged their bodies into Fontaine's cabin home, which he then set alight. In the spring of 2001, Shackelford was found guilty for two counts of murder in the first degree and sentenced to death. In the wake of these events, Palahniuk began working on the novel Lullaby. He stated that he wrote the novel to help him cope with having participated in the decision to have Shackelford receive the death sentence.

=== "Guts" and Haunted ===
While on his 2003 tour to promote his novel Diary, Palahniuk read to his audiences a short story entitled "Guts", a tale of accidents involving masturbation, which appears in his book Haunted. The story begins with the author telling his listeners to inhale deeply and that "this story should last about as long as you can hold your breath." It was reported that 40 people had fainted listening to the readings while holding their breath. Playboy magazine later published the story in their March 2004 issue and Palahniuk offered to let them publish another story along with it, but the publishers found the second work too disturbing to publish. On his tour to promote Stranger than Fiction: True Stories during the summer of 2004, he read "Guts" to audiences again, bringing the total number of fainters up to 53 (and later up to 60 while on tour to promote the softcover edition of Diary). In the fall of that year, he began promoting Haunted, and continued to read "Guts". In June 2005, Palahniuk noted that his number of fainters was up to 67.

At a 2005 appearance in Miami, Florida, during the Haunted tour, Palahniuk commented that Haunted represented the last of a "horror trilogy" (including Lullaby and Diary). He also indicated that his then-forthcoming novel, Rant, would be the first of a "science fiction trilogy".

In 2008, Palahniuk spent a week at the Clarion West Writers Workshop, instructing eighteen students about his writing methods and theory of fiction.

=== Adaptations ===
In addition to the film, Fight Club was adapted into a fighting video game loosely based on the film, which was released in October 2004, receiving universally poor reviews. Palahniuk mentioned at book readings that he was working on a musical based on Fight Club with David Fincher and Trent Reznor. Edward Norton said that he thinks it was unlikely that he and Brad Pitt, who "can't sing", would reprise their film roles in a musical.

Graphic novel adaptations of Invisible Monsters and Lullaby, drawn by comic artist Kissgz, a.k.a. Gabor, are available online.

Following the success of the Fight Club movie, interest began to build about adapting Survivor to film. The film rights to Survivor were sold in early 2001, but no movie studio had committed to filming the novel. After the attacks on the Pentagon and World Trade Center on September 11, 2001, movie studios allegedly deemed the novel too controversial to film because it includes the hijacking and crashing of a civilian airplane.

Following that, the film rights to Invisible Monsters and Diary also were sold. While little is known about some of these projects, Jessica Biel was signed on to play the roles of both Shannon and Brandy in Invisible Monsters, which was supposed to begin filming in 2004, but as of 2010 was still in development.

On January 14, 2008, the film version of Choke premiered at the Sundance Film Festival, starring Sam Rockwell, Kelly Macdonald and Anjelica Huston with Clark Gregg directing. David Fincher expressed interest in filming Diary as an HBO miniseries.

On September 11, 2014, the film version of Rant was announced, starring James Franco, with Pamela Romanowsky writing and directing but the movie was never made.

In 2016, a Kickstarter campaign to produce an adaptation of Lullaby, to be directed by Andy Mingo with a script by Palahniuk and Mingo, raised over $400,000, but the film was never produced.

== Writing style and themes ==
=== Style ===
Palahniuk says that his writing style has been influenced by authors such as the minimalist Tom Spanbauer (whose weekly workshop Palahniuk attended in Portland from 1991 to 1996), Amy Hempel, Mark Richard, Denis Johnson, Joan Didion, Thom Jones, Bret Easton Ellis and philosophers Michel Foucault, Friedrich Nietzsche and Albert Camus. In what the author refers to as a minimalistic approach, his writings include a limited vocabulary and short sentences to mimic the way that an average person telling a story would speak. In an interview, he said that he "prefers to write in verbs instead of adjectives". Repetitions of certain lines or phrases in the story narrative (what Palahniuk refers to as "choruses") are one of the most common characteristics of his writing style, being dispersed within most chapters of his novels. Palahniuk has said that there also are some choruses between novels, noting that the color cornflower blue and the city of Missoula, Montana appear in many of his novels. The characters in Palahniuk's stories often break into philosophical asides (either by the narrator to the reader, or spoken to the narrator through dialogue), offering numerous odd theories and opinions, often misanthropic or darkly absurdist in nature, on complex issues such as death, morality, childhood, parenthood, sexuality, and a deity. Other concepts borrowed from Spanbauer include the avoidance of "received text" (clichéd phrases or wording) and use of "burnt tongue" (intentionally odd wording).

In an interview with Jason Tanamor, he said, "It's pathetic how much I rewrite. I'll rework every scene a hundred times before my agent sees it. Then rework it a dozen times before my editor sees it. Then rework it all - almost beyond recognition - before it goes to the copy editor. My first draft is almost a bare-bones outline, fleshed out with every subsequent pass through. I'll 'test' the scenes in workshop and with friends, then revise them based on audience reaction and feedback. The only time a book is 'done' is when the type is set. By then I'm in love with a new idea, so the old one is officially finished."

=== Themes ===
Palahniuk's writing often contains anti-consumerist themes. Writing about Fight Club, Paul Kennett argues that because the Narrator's fights with Tyler Durden are fights with himself, and because he fights himself in front of his boss at the hotel, the Narrator is using the fights as a way of asserting himself as his own boss. These fights are a representation of the struggle of the proletarian at the hands of a higher capitalist power; by asserting himself as capable of having the same power he thus becomes his own master. Later when fight club is formed, the participants are all dressed and groomed similarly, allowing them to symbolically fight themselves at the club and gain the same power. In an interview with HuffPost, Palahniuk says that "the central message of Fight Club was always about the empowerment of the individual through small, escalating challenges."

=== Reception and criticism ===
The content of Palahniuk's works has been described as nihilistic. Palahniuk has rejected this label, stating that he is a romantic, and that his works are mistakenly seen as nihilistic because they express ideas that others do not believe in.

== Personal life ==
As an adult, Palahniuk became a member of the Cacophony Society. He is a regular participant in their events, including the annual Santa Rampage (a public Christmas party involving pranks and drunkenness) in Portland, Oregon. His participation in the Society inspired some of the events in his writings, both fictional and non-fictional.

In 2004, Palahniuk came out as gay after an interview with Karen Valby, a reporter for Entertainment Weekly. Believing he would be publicly outed by Valby after confidentially referring to his male partner, he disclosed his homosexuality online. The published article did not reference his sexual orientation, and he later issued a public apology. According to an interview with The Advocate in May 2008, he and his partner Mike live in a former church compound outside Vancouver, Washington. They have been together since the 1990s, having met while Palahniuk was working at Freightliner.

== Awards ==
Palahniuk has won the following awards:

- 1997 Pacific Northwest Booksellers Association Award (for Fight Club)
- 1997 Oregon Book Award for Best Novel (for Fight Club)
- 2003 Pacific Northwest Booksellers Association Award (for Lullaby)

He was nominated for the 1999 Oregon Book Award for Best Novel for Survivor and for the Bram Stoker Award for Best Novel for Lullaby in 2002 and for Haunted in 2005.

== Works ==
=== Fiction ===
- Fight Club (1996)
- Survivor (1999)
- Invisible Monsters (1999)
- Choke (2001)
- Lullaby (2002)
- Diary (2003)
- Haunted (2005)
- Rant (2007)
- Snuff (2008)
- Pygmy (2009)
- Tell-All (2010)
- Damned (2011)
- Invisible Monsters Remix (2012)
- Doomed (2013)
- Burnt Tongues (2014) (editor)
- Beautiful You (2014)
- Make Something Up (2015)
- Fight Club 2 (2015–16) (graphic novel with Cameron Stewart)
- Bait: Off-Color Stories for You to Color (2016)
- Legacy: An Off-Color Novella for You to Color (2017)
- Adjustment Day (2018)
- Fight Club 3 (2019) (graphic novel with Cameron Stewart)
- The Invention of Sound (2020)
- Not Forever, But For Now (2023)
- Shock Induction (2024)
- Long Division (2024) (editor)
- Silent Nightmares (2026) (editor)
- Galleria (2027)

=== Short fiction ===
- "Negative Reinforcement" in Modern Short Stories (1990)
- "The Love Theme of Sybil and William" in Modern Short Stories (1990)
- "Guts" in Playboy (March 2004)
- "Foot Work" in Playboy (May 2005)
- "Insiders" in Best Life (September 2007)
- "Mister Elegant" in VICE (2007)
- "Fetch" in Dark Delicacies III (2009)
- "Loser" in Stories (2010)
- "Knock, Knock" in Playboy (December 2010)
- "Romance" in Playboy (2011)
- "Phoenix" (2013) Amazon Kindle Exclusive
- "Cannibal" in Playboy (May 2013)
- "Zombie" in Playboy (2013)
- "Let's See What Happens" in Nightmare Magazine, Issue 37 (2015)
- "Dad All Over" in Playboy (July/August 2015)
- "One Day You'll Thank Me" in Fangoria, Volume 2, Issue 1 (2018)
- "Unlawful Entry" in Playboy (2018)
- "Repercussions" in Playboy (Winter 2019)
- ”Celeste” in Long Division (2024)
- ”Kingston” in Silent Nightmares (2026)

=== Non-fiction ===
- Fugitives and Refugees: A Walk in Portland, Oregon (2003)
- Stranger than Fiction: True Stories (2004)
- You Do Not Talk About Fight Club: I Am Jack's Completely Unauthorized Essay Collection (2008) (introduction)
- Consider This: Moments In My Writing Life After Which Everything Was Different (2020)

=== Films ===
- Fight Club (1999) (feature based on the novel)
- Choke (2008) (feature based on the novel)
- Romance (2012) (short based on the short story)
- Lullaby (TBD) (feature based on the novel)
- Rant (TBD) (feature based on the novel)
