= Fugitives and Refugees =

2003 book by Chuck Palahniuk

Fugitives and Refugees: A Walk in Portland, Oregon
- Author: Chuck Palahniuk
- Language: English
- Subject: Travel
- Genre: Non-fiction
- Publisher: Crown
- Publication date: July 8, 2003
- Publication place: United States
- Media type: Print (hardcover & paperback)
- Pages: 176 pages
- ISBN: 1-4000-4783-8 (hardcover)
- OCLC: 51058952
- Dewey Decimal: 917.95/490444 21
- LC Class: F884.P83 P35 2003

Fugitives and Refugees: A Walk in Portland, Oregon is a travelogue by novelist Chuck Palahniuk.

The book alternates between autobiographical chapters, and lists of the author's favorite activities in his home city of Portland, Oregon, in the Pacific Northwest of the United States.

Palahniuk guides the reader to eviction court for evocative storytelling, a massive Goodwill charity sale for purchasing clothes by the pound, and to clubs and sexual fetish organizations.

== Reception ==
Entertainment Weekly's Noah Robischon gave the book an "A" rating and wrote, "this street atlas of the weird makes for an intoxicating trip to a place you never knew you wanted to visit."

== See also ==
- List of travel books
