= Rodrigo Corral =

American artist

- Education: School of Visual Arts
- Movement: Graphic Design
- Website: rodrigocorral.com

Rodrigo Corral is a graphic designer and conceptual artist based in New York City. In 2002, Corral founded Rodrigo Corral Design studio to create book jacket art for the publishing industry. Corral has created designs and conceptual art for Jay-Z, Ray Dalio, John Green, Chuck Palahniuk, Eric Schmidt, Daniel Libeskind, Gary Shteyngart, Junot Diaz, Gucci Mane, Mary-Kate and Ashley Olsen, Jared Leto, Jeff VanderMeer, Edward Snowden, Ben Stiller, Judd Apatow and for organizations such as The Criterion Collection, New York magazine, and The New York Times.

== Early life and education ==
Rodrigo Corral was born in Long Island, New York. His parents immigrated from Colombia shortly before he was born. He attended the School of Visual Arts in New York City.

== Career ==
Rodrigo Corral has taught design at the School of Visual Arts and Cooper Union. He was included in the 2018 New York Times list of best book covers, and published his own New York Times bestselling book, Sneakers, in 2018. He also designed the cover for Chuck Palahniuk's satirical novel, Snuff.

He is currently the creative director at Farrar, Straus and Giroux, Creative Director at Large at New Directions Publishing, and runs his own studio, Rodrigo Corral Design.
