= Film i Väst =

Swedish film studio

Coordinates: 58°16′26″N 12°16′46″E

- Logo used since 2015
- Type: Film company
- Founded: 1992
- Headquarters: Trollhättan, Sweden
- Website: filmivast.se

Film i Väst facilities in Trollhättan

Film i Väst (English: "Film in West") is a film company located in Trollhättan, Sweden, founded in 1992 by the Älvsborg County Council. Film i Väst became known early on under the nickname Trollywood (from Trollhättan + Hollywood). Since its inception, Film i Väst has co-produced a total of more than 1,000 Swedish and international feature films, TV dramas, documentaries and short films. Lars von Trier used its facilities in his movies, such as Dogville and Manderlay.

== Walk of Fame ==
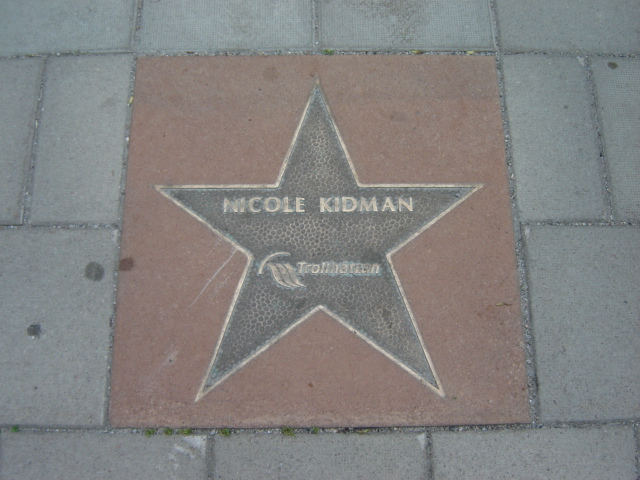
Star awarded to Nicole Kidman for her work in Dogville

Trollhättan has a small Walk of Fame, featuring stars of the movie industry who worked in Film i Väst productions.

== Selected productions ==
- Fucking Åmål (1998) (known as Show Me Love in English-speaking countries)
- Under solen (1998)
- Noll tolerans (1999)
- Tsatsiki, morsan och polisen (1999)
- Dancer in the Dark (2000)
- Den bästa sommaren (2000)
- Det nya landet (2000)
- Jalla! Jalla! (2000)
- Tillsammans (2000)
- Livvakterna (2001)
- Tsatsiki - vänner för alltid (2001)
- Alla älskar Alice (2002)
- Bäst i Sverige! (2002)
- Lilja 4-ever (2002)
- Den tredje vågen (2003)
- Dogville (2003)
- Hannah med H (2003)
- Kopps (2003)
- Miffo (2003)
- Smala Sussie (2003)
- Tillfällig fru sökes (2003)
- Danslärarens återkomst (2004)
- Masjävlar (2004)
- Kim Novak badade aldrig i Genesarets sjö (2005)
- Tjenare kungen (2005)
- Zozo (2005)
- Storm (2006)
- Involuntary (2008) (Swedish title: De ofrivilliga)
- Antichrist (2009)
- Snabba Cash (2009)
- Cornelis (2010)
- In a Better World (2010) (Danish title: Hævnen)
- Fallet (2017)
- The Girl in the Spider's Web (2018)
- Tumbbad (2018)
- Living (2022)
- Heroic (2023)
- Together 99 (Tillsammans 99) (2023)
- Sentimental Value (2025)
- The Girl with the Leica (2026)
