= Dar Khalifa =

The Caliph's House
- Dar Khalifa (Arabic)
- Interactive map of the The Caliph's House area

General information
- Type: Large historical private home in walled grounds
- Architectural style: Moroccan
- Location: Ain Diab (suburb), Casablanca, Morocco
- Coordinates: 33.5815°N 7.6819°W
- Current tenants: Tahir Shah

Technical details
- Grounds: 5000m^{2}

Website
- www.thecaliphshouse.org

Dar Khalifa (Arabic: دار خليفة), or The Caliph's House, is a large, historical landmark and private home in walled grounds. It is located in Ain Diab, an affluent suburb of Casablanca that was also host to a sprawling shanty town until the area was redeveloped. Constructed in a traditional Moroccan style, with numerous "riads", or garden courtyards, the property extends to some 5000 square metres, and is situated on a cliff overlooking the Atlantic shore. As its name suggests, the mansion was once owned by a wealthy Khalif or ruler.

It is now home to the author Tahir Shah who is renovating the property, and it will become the headquarters of the educational and cultural non-profit organisation, The Scheherazade Foundation.

== History ==
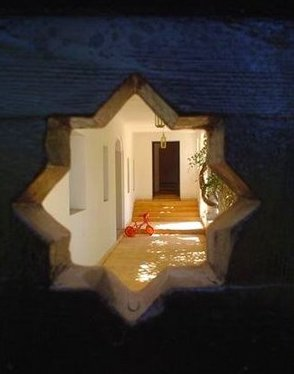
A corridor at Dar Khalifa.

Writing in Literal magazine, Sergio Missana points out that unlike many other cities in Spain that have inherited names of Arabic origin, "Casablanca is an anomaly: a North African city with a Spanish name."

Author Jason Webser writes in the Financial Times that according to local historians, Dar Khalifa may be the original "white house" that gives Casablanca its name. Until early in the twentieth century, Dar Khalifa (and the small tower formerly beside it) was the only significant building on the stretch of coast. The fifteenth-century Portuguese explorer Duarte Pacheco Pereira wrote about a white structure on a promontory used by mariners as a landmark to pinpoint Anfa, the old name for the city. This they referred to in Portuguese as Casabranca, which in time turned into the Spanish Casablanca. When Anfa was rebuilt after the 1755 Lisbon earthquake by Mohammed III in the late eighteenth century, "the white house" – in reference to Dar Khalifa, which by this time had become a Sufi zawiya – became the preferred name for the city both in Arabic (ad-Dār al-Bayḍā) and for Europeans (Casablanca). The name of the property itself, "The Caliph's House", may suggest that the building dates back at least to the thirteenth century, as the last person in Morocco to style himself a Caliph was the Almohad Idris al-Wathiq, who died in 1269.

== Current occupation ==
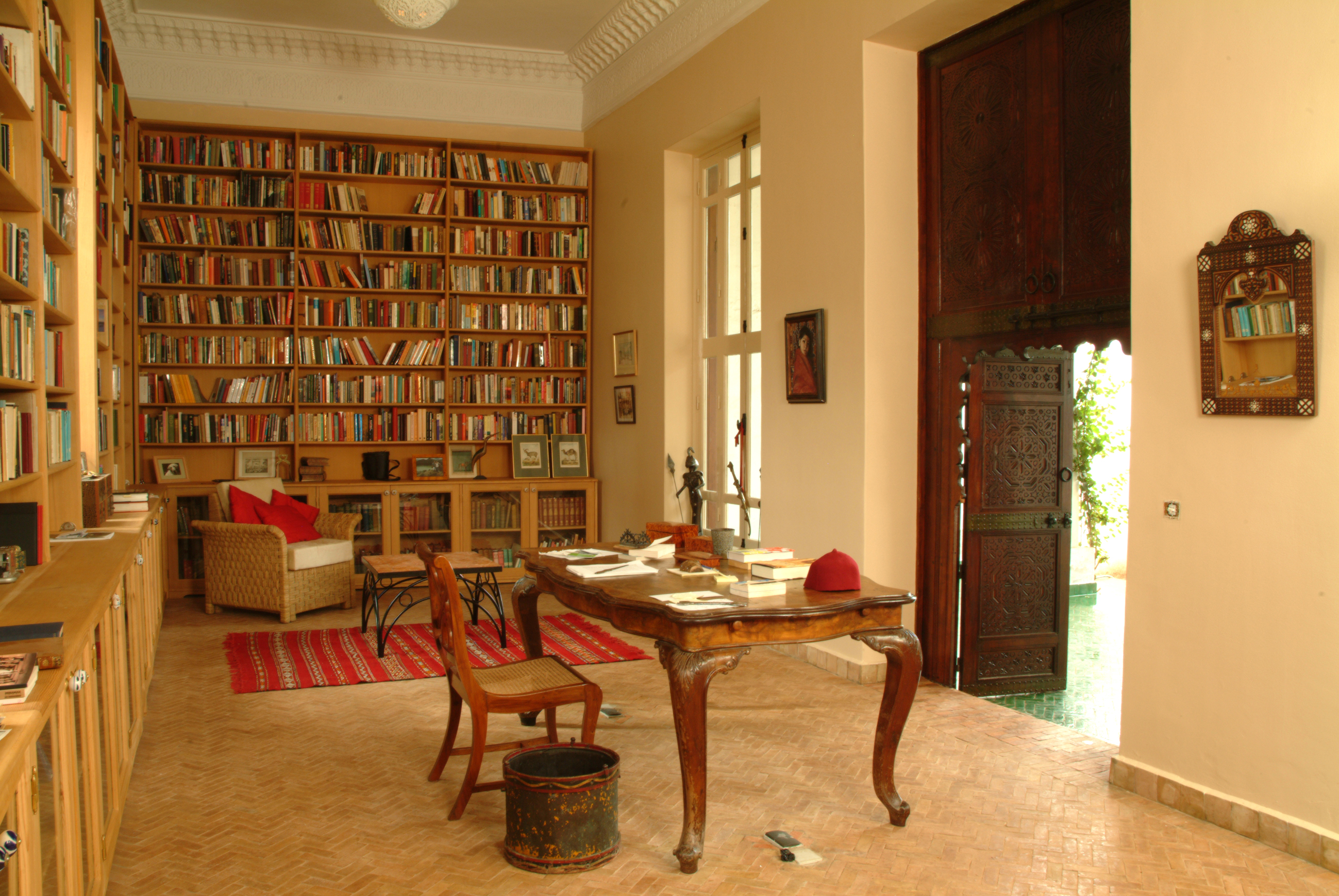
The library at Dar Khalifa.

In March 2003, British author Tahir Shah purchased Dar Khalifa and set about renovating the property, which was at the time "set squarely in the middle of a shanty town". The property had been unoccupied for ten years and fallen into dilapidation before Shah and his family purchased it and moved in. Shah's year-long renovation is described in his non-fiction work, The Caliph's House – one of TIME's 10 best books for 2006 – as well as his coming to terms that the house was said by locals we be haunted by "jinns". Shortly after moving in, Shah hired a team of exorcists to cleanse Dar Khalifa, in order to placate the fears of locals. Shah's life at Dar Khalifa and in the city of Casablanca was continued in his next book, In Arabian Nights.

Between 2014 and 2021 the shanty town was cleared, and Dar Khalifa now finds itself positioned between two up-market apartment buildings, "Residence Anfa Sunset", and "Residence Les Allées Marines".

=== Headquarters for The Scheherazade Foundation ===
In 2022, work began on renovating Dar Khalifa to turn it into the headquarters of The Scheherazade Foundation, a non-profit dedicated to folklore and teaching stories – "tales that contain ancient wisdom".

According to Jason Webster, writing in the Financial Times, Tahir Shah "hired artisans and craftsmen from across Morocco to work on fabulous zellij fountains, stucco screens with geometric Islamic designs, and intricately carved wooden Berber doorways."

=== Storytelling and teaching stories ===
Tahir Shah comes from a family tradition of writers and storytellers, and he has studied traditional "teaching stories" for many years. These stories contain layers of deeper meaning, and Shah likens them to eating a fruit: "a pleasant experience that also contains a form of nutrition." One of the Scheherazade Foundation's main aims is to publish and disseminate these traditional tales, and also to host a storytelling festival at Dar Khalifa.

== See also ==
- Category:Shah family
