= Search for the Lost City of Gold =

Search For the Lost City of Gold is a 2003 documentary commissioned by The History Channel and Five (UK). It traces Tahir Shah's epic quest for the lost city of Paititi in the Madre de Dios jungle of Peru, to which the Incas fled from the Spanish in 1532. This journey and his TV-hour film also formed the basis for the book House of the Tiger King, as well as the cinematic feature film with the same name. The film was produced by Caravan Film and was directed by Swedish film director David Flamholc.

The History Channel summary: "In the 16th century, Spanish conquistadors swept through Peru in search of great golden treasure. But when they stormed the Incan stronghold of Vilcabamba in 1572, they found the city deserted, burned, and stripped of its wealth. Legend says that the Incas had retreated deep into the jungle and built another magnificent city in an inaccessible quarter of the cloud forest. For more than four centuries, explorers, adventurers, and archaeologists have searched for the gold and riches of the Incas. Now, we follow Tahir Shah, who teams up with Pancho, a Machiguenga warrior who claims that as a youth, he saw massive stone ruins deep in Peru's Madre de Dios jungle. Set against a backdrop of virgin jungle and cloud forest, we join with Shah as he searches for the greatest Lost City of the Americas and the Incan treasure."

This documentary is used as a teaching tool both in jungle leadership and, in the wider context of a corporate environment, in general leadership, problem-solving, and team building. Leading corporations use the documentary as a basis for both leadership seminars and team training.
