= Nattbuss 807 =

- Directed by: David Flamholc
- Written by: Leon Flamholc
- Produced by: Leon Flamholc
- Music by: Kenneth Cosimo; Joachim Cohen; David Flamholc
- Production company: Caravan Film
- Release date: 28 February 1997 (Sweden)
- Running time: 105 minutes
- Country: Sweden
- Language: Swedish

Nattbuss 807 (English: Night Bus 807) is a Swedish true crime thriller film based on the real murder of a young skinhead in 1992. The film was released to cinemas in Sweden on 28 February 1997, directed by David Flamholc. The film is based on a true story and events of the 1992 murder of a young boy in Vendelsö during the Stockholm Water Festival. The movie received mixed reviews but gained "cult" status by the younger audience in Sweden.

The movie's script and dialogues are taken directly from the real murder investigation. Many scenes in the movie and most of the dialogue happened in real life, such as the fights, the hooliganism, the police hearings and many of the pieces of evidence found.

== Cast ==
- Jonte Halldén as Kalle
- Christian Moscoso as Carlos
- Jenny Lindroth as Eva
- Johan Svangren as Sören
- Fredrik Dolk as Detective Inspector Tomas Falk
- Catarina Ackell as Malin
- Fadi Ada as Omar
- Dominiko Aguirre Fernández as Rodrigo
- Rolf Andersson as Torbjörn
- Constantin Babar as Tahir
- Stina Beck as Sara
- Johan Bergenlöv as Lindström
- Jonas Carlquist as Jimmy
- Joachim Cohen
- Eddy Toro Duarte as Roberto
- Peter Ekefelt as Bus Driver
- Krister Engholm as Black Swede
- Sergio Painemal Escobar as Chino
