= Lina Perned =

Swedish actress (born 1973)

- Born: Lina Lee Perned; 26 July 1973 (age 53); Helsingborg, Sweden
- Occupation: Actress

Lina Lee Perned, born 26 July 1973 in Helsingborg, is a Swedish actress.

== Career ==
Lina Perned started as a dresser at the Stockholm City Theatre. She made her film debut at the age of 19 with the lead role in the 1992 youth film Ha ett underbart liv (Have a Wonderful Life).

In 1996 she appeared in the TV series En fyra för tre. She lived for a while in the UK, where she studied film, made short films and worked as a flight attendant. She has also performed at Teater Sandino and Spegelteatern in plays such as William Shakespeare's Love's Labour's Lost, Much Ado About Nothing and Measure for Measure.

In 1999, she played in Lithivm directed and written by David Flamholc then in 2000 in Naken, a film by Mårten Knutsson and Torkel Knutsson. In 2003 she graduated from the Kulturama Film School.

In the summer of 2007, she performed in the Spegelteater production of Shakespeare's A Midsummer Night's Dream at Steninge Manor. In 2013, Lina Perned played the character of Livia Burlando in the ninth season of the television series Il commissario Montalbano. In the role of Montabalno's girlfriend, she replaced Katharina Bohm from the ninth season onwards and was herself replaced by Sonia Bergamasco.

In 2018, she shot Jimmy Jones directed by Jonas Overton.
