= Lithivm =

1998 Swedish horror film

- Directed by: David Flamholc
- Written by: David Flamholc
- Produced by: Leon Flamholc
- Starring: Fredrik Dolk; Johan Widerberg; Björn Granath
- Cinematography: Mårten Nilsson
- Edited by: Leon Flamholc
- Music by: Kenneth Cosimo
- Production company: Caravan Film AB
- Distributed by: Sonet Film
- Release date: 28 August 1998
- Running time: 127 min
- Budget: $500 000 (estimated)

Lithivm (also known as Lithium Europe) is a Swedish horror thriller from 1998 directed by David Flamholc and Swedish voice acting veteran Fredrik Dolk and Johan Widerberg. The title of the film is a stylised spelling of Lithium which is used to treat people with bipolar disorder.

== Plot ==
The bipolar Hanna gets an internship at a newspaper but is not satisfied with her duties that involve reading letters. She is pestered by her psychopathic on-and-off lover Martin and comes to believe that the divorced schizophrenic Dag is a serial killer.

== Cast ==
- Agnieszka Koson - Hanna (as Agnieszka)
- Fredrik Dolk - Dag Tingström
- Johan Widerberg - Martin
- Yvonne Lombard - Hasse
- Björn Granath - Lt. Henrik Laurentsson
- Marika Lagercrantz - Margareta
- Lina Perned - Marianne
- Göran Forsmark - Werner
- Ola Wahlström - Greidner
- Måns Westfelt - Birger
- Kent-Arne Dahlgren - Sten (Stone)
- Simon Paulsson - Filip
- Christer Holmgren - Stefan
- Babben Larsson - as herself
- Finn Kronsporre - Police
- Jannike Grut - Police woman
- Annika Sund - Police driver
- Tony Lindsjö - Police

=== Crew ===
- Production Designer Erika Ökvist
- Assistant Director Gita Mallik
- Carpenter Ayden Demirkiran
- Sound Effects by Monir Eriksson
- Stunt Coordinator Lars Lundgren
- Best girl Rebecka Liljeberg
- Grip operated by Peter Pettersson
- Sound Mixer Berndt Frithiof
- First Assistant Camera Mikaël Meisen-Dietmann
- Stunts by Joachim von Rost
- Production Assistant Martin Goldberg
- Production Assistant Marie Eklinder

== About the film ==
The film was shot in Stockholm using 16 mm reverse film that was later blown up to 35mm. This created much grain. The cinematography Flamholc and Mårten Nilsson was going for, was a further stylisation of the techniques they had used in Nightbus 807. Lithvim was the third and final film Flamholc made with Fredrik Dolk and his final fiction film to date. The film did receive support from the Swedish Film Institute.

== Response ==
The film bombed on the Swedish box office and was declared one of the worst Swedish films of all time. In the US the film was on the other hand received very well, the film won ”Young Filmmaker Award” at Hollywood Film Festival. And Variety wrote: ”Flamholc visual storytelling is already a paragon of young Nordic cinema responding to — and possibly setting — late-’90s trends.” "Production values on $500,000 pic are memorable, from Kenneth Cosimo’s jarring techno score to d.p. Marten Nilsson’s stunning images, which at extreme moments saturate the screen with ultra-grainy textures in a urine-like yellow."
