= Jason Webster (author) =

Anglo-American author (born 1970)

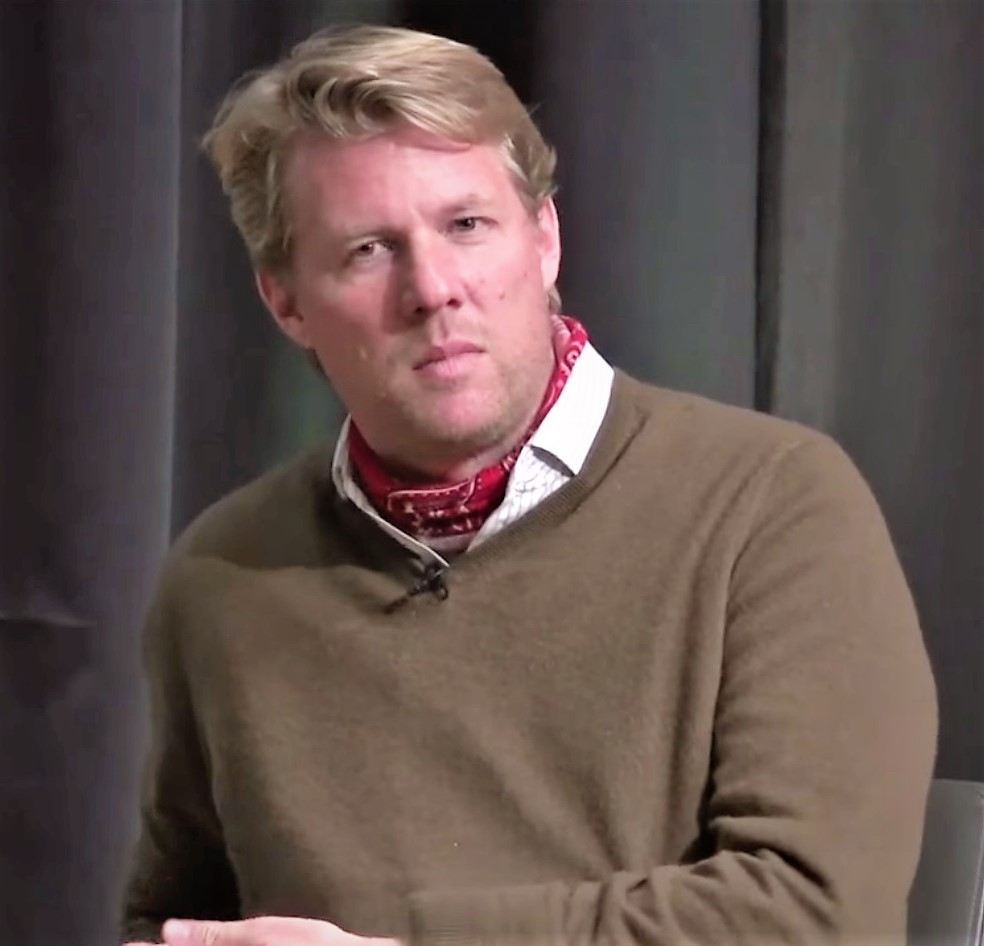
- Webster speaks on Crime Fiction at the British Library in 2013
- Born: July 26, 1970 (age 56); San Francisco
- Occupation: Writer
- Spouse: Salud Botella
- Children: 2
- Writing career
- Genres: Crime, Travel, History
- Subject: Spain
- Website: jasonwebster.net

Jason Webster is an Anglo-American author who writes on Spain. He was born in California to British parents in 1970. He has spent most of his adult life in Spain, having settled in Valencia with his Spanish wife, actress and dancer Salud Botella. He is a director of The Scheherazade Foundation.

== Education ==
Webster was educated in England, Egypt and Italy. In 1993 he graduated from Oxford University (St John's College) with a degree in Arabic and Islamic History.

== Works ==
Webster is the author of fifteen books on Spain and Spanish themes, ranging from travel to history, biography, detective fiction, essay, short story and poetry. He has appeared in several television documentaries and his works have been translated into a dozen languages.

=== Books ===
- Duende: A journey in search of Flamenco (2003), which recounts Webster's move to Spain after university and his quest to learn flamenco guitar and the path to the elusive yet passionate feeling of duende, an untranslatable term referring to the feeling that is the essence of flamenco. It was long-listed for the Guardian First Book Award and read on BBC Radio 4's Book of the Week.
- Andalus: Unlocking the secrets of Moorish Spain (2004, Doubleday, ISBN 0-385-60507-2) examines the deep impact left on Spain – and by extension the rest of Europe – by the Moorish presence and was adapted as a radio play by the BBC.
- Guerra: Living in the shadows of the Spanish Civil War (2006, Black Swan, ISBN 0-385-60854-3), studied the wounds left by the civil war on contemporary Spain through a combination of history and travel. A Spanish edition, Las heridas abiertas de la guerra civil, was published in 2008 with a prologue by Paul Preston of the London School of Economics
- Sacred Sierra: A year on a Spanish mountain (2009, Chatto & Windus, ISBN 0-7011-8157-5) describes a year that Webster and his Spanish wife spent living on their mountain farm in eastern Spain, on the slopes of the sacred peak of Penyagolosa, working on the land and planting trees with the help of a 12th-century Moorish gardening manual. It paints a portrait of a little-known part of the country, with details of its folklore, history and customs, and with meditations on stories, the need to preserve them and their importance for communities. Webster made a short promotional film for the book in conjunction with the award-winning Swedish film director David Flamholc of Caravan Film.
- Or the Bull Kills You (2011, Minotaur Books, ISBN 0-312-58183-1) is a crime novel set in the world of bullfighting. It is the first in a series of detective stories set in Valencia around central character Chief Inspector Max Cámara of the Spanish National Police. It was long-listed in July 2011 for a Crime Writers' Association dagger award (the CWA New Blood Dagger).
- A Death in Valencia (2012, Minotaur Books, ISBN 0-312-58184-X), a second Chief Inspector Max Cámara crime novel.
- The Anarchist Detective (2013, Chatto & Windus, ISBN 0-7011-8690-9), is the third Chief Inspector Max Cámara crime novel set in La Mancha.
- The Spy with 29 Names (2014, Chatto & Windus, ISBN 0-7011-8774-3), published in the US as The Great Garbo Deception: Hitler, D-Day and a Man Called Juan (Corsario, ISBN 978-1-913955-08-3) tells the true story of Spaniard Juan Pujol, MI5's double agent Garbo, who played a vital role in the success of the Allies' Normandy campaign in World War II.
- Blood Med (2014, Chatto & Windus, ISBN 0-7011-8691-7), is the fourth Chief Inspector Max Cámara crime novel, focussing on the political and social problems of contemporary Spain.
- A Body in Barcelona (2015, Chatto & Windus,), is the fifth Chief Inspector Max Cámara novel, set mostly in Barcelona against a backdrop of attempts by Catalan activists to declare independence from Spain. The novel anticipated by two years similar moves in real life by Catalan politicians, who held a controversial referendum on independence in October 2017.
- Fatal Sunset (2017, Chatto & Windus,), is the sixth Chief Inspector Max Cámara novel, set mostly in and around the city of Valencia.
- Violencia: A New History of Spain (2019, Constable, ISBN 1-4721-2985-7), published in the US as Why Spain Matters: A History of the Land that Shaped the Western World (Corsario, ISBN 978-1-913955-04-5).
- The World of Max Cámara (2020, Corsario, ISBN 978-1-913955-00-7), Volume I of Webster's Mosaics of Spain series, is a collection of essays, articles, photos, interviews and a short story focussing on the author's fictional police detective and the city of Valencia, where he lives and works.
- The Art of Flamenco (2020, Corsario, ISBN 978-1-913955-02-1), Volume II of the Mosaics of Spain series, is a collection of articles, essays and photos focussing on flamenco.
- The Book of Duende (2022, Corsario, ISBN 978-1-913955-09-0) is an in-depth examination of what Webster describes as 'the magical and often mysterious force at the heart of flamenco', containing aphorisms, essays, proverbs, stories and poetry.

Apart from his books, Webster has also written for the British newspapers The Guardian, The Observer, Financial Times, The Daily Mail, the New Statesman and Sunday Telegraph, and for the Spanish newspaper El Asombrario.

He has appeared in several British TV documentaries, including An Islamic History of Europe, presented by Rageh Omaar on BBC television and the critically acclaimed Andalusia: The Legacy of the Moors for Five.

In April 2013 he presented "Flashmob Flamenco", a documentary for BBC Radio 4 on the response within the Flamenco community to the economic crisis in Spain.

== Interviews with Webster ==
- BBC Excess Baggage
- This is Valencia Magazine
- Shotsmag Crime & Thriller Ezine
- Podría estar varias vidas estudiando España

== See also ==
- The Scheherazade Foundation

== Reviews of Webster's books ==
- Review of Duende in The Guardian
- Review of Andalus in The Telegraph
- Review of Guerra in The Sunday Telegraph
- Review of Sacred Sierra in The Independent
- Review of Or the Bull Kills You in The Independent
- Review of Or the Bull Kills You in Shots Ezine
