= Fredrik Dolk =

Swedish actor

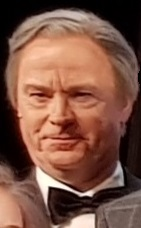
- in Annie, Malmö 2019
- Born: 14 December 1961 (age 64); Solna, Stockholm County, Sweden

Gustav Fredrik Dolk (born 14 December 1961) is a Swedish actor. He is a noted voice actor and has dubbed the Swedish voice of Buzz Lightyear in Toy Story, Splinter in Teenage Mutant Ninja Turtles, Superman in Superman: The Animated Series, and Tuxedo Mask in Sailor Moon. He has appeared on stage, in television and films since 1991. He cameoed in the 2010 Swedish science fiction horror film Sector 236 – Thor's Wrath. In 2011 he appeared in David Fincher's The Girl with the Dragon Tattoo. He has appeared in the Swedish horror film Wither, a film based on Swedish folklore.

== Filmography ==
Year	Title	Role	Notes
1990	Teenage Mutant Ninja Turtles	Splinter, Baxter Stockman	Swedish dub
1991	Joker Returns	Rydell	
1993	Tryggare kan ingen vara...	Peter	
1995	Toy Story	Buzz Lightyear	Swedish dub
1995	Höst i paradiset	Polis	
1996	Vackert väder	Kurt - Manager at McDonald's Restaurant	
1997	Nattbuss 807	Detective Inspector Tomas Falk	
1997	Svensson Svensson - Filmen	Göran	
1998	Lithivm	Dan Tingström	
1999	Sherdil	Adjutant	
1999	Zero Tolerance	Kriminalinspektör Peter Kroon	
1999	Toy Story 2	Buzz Lightyear	Swedish dub
2001	Executive Protection	Kroon	
2002	Harry Potter and the Chamber of Secrets	Gilderoy Lockhart	Swedish dub
2003	The Third Wave	Kroon	
2005	Harry Potter and the Goblet of Fire	Alastor "Mad Eye" Moody	Swedish dub
2006	Cars	Buzz Lightyear Car	Swedish dub
2006	Charlotte's Web	Samuel the Sheep	Swedish dub
2007	Meet the Robinsons	Gaston	Swedish dub
2007	Harry Potter and the Order of the Phoenix	Alastor "Mad Eye" Moody	Swedish dub
2008	Morgan Pålsson - världsreporter	Sven	
2009	Johan Falk: GSI - Gruppen för särskilda insatser	Peter Kroon	
2009	Scener ur ett kändisskap	Fredrik Dolk	
2010	Klara	Domare	
2010	Sector 236 – Thor's Wrath	Colonel Stag	
2010	Toy Story 3	Buzz Lightyear	Swedish dub
2010	Megamind	Metro Man	Swedish dub
2011	The Girl with the Dragon Tattoo	Wennerström's Lawyer	
2012	Villa Thalassa - helgen v. 48	Kaj Widstam	
2012	Johan Falk: Kodnamn: Lisa	Peter Kroon	
2017	Smurfs: The Lost Village	Hefty Smurf	Swedish dub
2018	Ralph Breaks the Internet	Buzz Lightyear	Swedish dub
2019	Toy Story 4	Buzz Lightyear	Swedish dub
2020	Atlantic Crossing	Per Albin Hansson	
