= Justine Kirk =

Swedish actress

- Born: 14 October 1966 (age 60); Manchester, Massachusetts, United States
- Spouse(s): Alejandro Barnet (married 2005-2011; divorced); Mattias Barsk (married 2016-2019; divorced)
- Website: justinekirk.com

Justine Kirk (born 14 October 1966) is a Swedish choreographer, actress, and former continuity announcer and host on Sveriges Television.

== Biography ==
Justine Kirk has a background as a dancer, choreographer and actress. During the 1990s, she appeared in minor roles in the films Zorn (1994), 30:e november (1995) and Lögn (1996).

From 1992 to 1998, she was a member of the Romeo and Juliet Choir in the Royal Dramatic Theatre.

From 1996 she was a program presenter on Sveriges Television. Justine Kirk appeared in the film about the murder of John Hron, where she played his mother. In the summer of 2015, she led the work on a program series with five men in Tornedalen who practiced a kind of ballet, Bastubaletten, based on movements that can be associated with sauna bathing and with the men's personalities. The series aired for three seasons (2015–2017). The last season featured five women from Tornedalen dancing in the sauna.

On 1 December 2017, she left SVT to freelance.

== Personal life ==
Justine Kirk is the granddaughter of Per-Oscar Nyströmer. From 2005 to 2011 she was married to actor Alejandro Bonnet, with whom she has two children. From 2016 to 2019 she was married to television producer Mattias Barsk.

== Filmography ==
- 1994 – Zorn (Pearl Pierce)
- 1995 – 30:e november (Madde's friend)
- 1996 – Lögn (student)

== Theatre roles ==
Year	Roll	Play	Director	Theatre
1996	Neighbor Mucisian	Les Précieuses ridicules Molière	Thommy Berggren	Royal Dramatic Theatre
1996	Student; Starboy	Fint folk Kent Andersson	Thommy Berggren	Royal Dramatic Theatre
