= Search for the Lost Treasure of Afghanistan =

Search for the Lost Treasure of Afghanistan is a 2007 documentary film, in which travel writer and explorer Tahir Shah heads off to Afghanistan, on a quest to find the alleged hidden treasure of Ahmad Shah Durrani. Following the clues in a notebook which was allegedly left to Shah by his ancestors, he teams up with Reza, a young Afghan archeologist and attempts to solve the mystery of the alleged treasure of Ahmad Shah. This film documents some of the adventures that occurred during three trips to Afghanistan between 2005 and 2006.

In 1740 Nadir Shah of Persia swept through Afghanistan into Mughal India during the reign of emperor Muhammad Shah. After sacking its capital at Delhi, he plundered the treasuries of the Mughal emperors, and hauled the wealth westward, over the Hindu Kush, towards his kingdom of Persia.

During the journey back to Persia Nadir Shah was murdered in his tent by his own guards. The young soldier Ahmad Shah Durrani, who was to become first king of modern Afghanistan and the founder of the Durrani Empire, found himself in possession of the looted treasure.

Ahmad Shah died an agonizing death soon afterwards succumbing to cancer of the face. Legend has it that his death was the result of the curse of the Koh-i-noor diamond. With the knowledge that his health was deteriorating, Ahmad Shah is alleged to have concealed the bulk of the treasure before his death. For almost two and a half centuries, Afghans and their rulers have searched for the alleged treasure of Ahmad Shah. A century ago, Amir Abdur-Rahman sent convicts to hunt in the dangerous tunnels commonly found in the region. More recently, Al Qaeda's henchmen have been thought to be looking.

Tahir Shah's family lived in Afghanistan for more than a thousand years as rulers, warriors, and mystics. Shah shares the same name as the first king, as well as a common ancestry. His father, Idries Shah, was Afghanistan's most famous writer of modern times, and was also preoccupied with the alleged lost treasure. His own fascination for riddle led him to write a bestselling novel about the alleged treasure of Ahmad Shah, Kara Kush.

This documentary was filmed on location in Afghanistan. It was directed by Swedish director David Flamholc and produced by Caravan Film.
