= Kara Kush =

1986 novel by Idries Shah

- Front cover of the book (1986)
- Author: Idries Shah
- Language: English
- Genre: Afghan adventure
- Publisher: William Collins Sons and Co., Ltd., Stein and Day, ISF Publishing
- Publication date: 1 May 1986, Jan 2019
- Publication place: UK, United States
- Media type: Print (Hardback)
- Pages: 575
- ISBN: 0812830989

Kara Kush, subtitled The Gold of Ahmad Shah, is an adventure novel by the Anglo–Afghan writer, thinker and teacher in the Sufi mystical tradition, Idries Shah.

In Afghan-Turki, kara kush means "eagle" and in the book this refers to the central character, a resistance leader nicknamed "The Eagle".

First published in 1986, it was republished in January 2019 by ISF Publishing, including new hardcover and paperback editions. Ebook and audiobook editions of Kara Kush have been produced for the first time.

== Summary ==
The novel is set in 20th–century Afghanistan during the Soviet–Afghan War, which lasted from 1979 to 1989. It is based on true stories that Shah collected on his travels after secretly entering Afghanistan at the height of the hostilities, to spend time with the Afghan resistance, and find out first-hand what life was like in his ancestral homeland.

Shah is quoted in The New York Times as having written the work "because it is a tremendous story which had not been told. I collected this material from freedom fighters, some of them my own relatives, from refugees, and from men and women, fighting shoulder to shoulder, from all over Afghanistan: a country the size of France, full of rich tales of valiant struggle against seemingly impossible odds."

Centering on a resistance leader nicknamed "The Eagle", the story also tells of a legendary horde of gold that once belonged to the Afghan king, Ahmad Shah Durrani, that had been located and must be kept secret from the Russian invaders. Idries Shah's father, Ikbal Ali-Shah had himself endeavoured to locate this lost treasure, and Shah's son, Tahir later made a film about his own attempt to find it, titled Search for the Lost Treasure of Afghanistan.

== Reception ==
Andrew Mole, reviewing Kara Kush in the Adelaide newspaper The Advertiser, found the book a good read, written from an interesting point of view. He agrees with Shah that the Soviets cannot win this war, explaining that this is because there was no centralised resistance at the time. "It is more a case of every man, woman and child having a go at every opportunity," Mole writes. "Instead of fighting one enemy they are fighting endless enemies[,] and destroying one village or battle group does not have the slightest effect on the next." This is something that most outsiders "gloss over", Mole says.

Writing in the Los Angeles Times, novelist M.E. Hirsh states that the author "has brought all his skills to bear, blending considerable scholarship with raw experience, and passion with a Sufi's love of paradox. The result is a book as remarkable as the country it portrays, and she likens its structure to the classic The Canterbury Tales."

Though generally positive about the Kara Kush, Hirsh does point out what she perceives as three flaws in the work: Firstly, that Shah writes with the benefit of hindsight; that he simplifies and dismisses pressures that led up to the war and the Russian invasion. Secondly, that action scenes suffer due to Shah presenting too much information about the munitions involved. Thirdly, that individual characters are "dwarfed" due to the epic scale of the book.

Finally, Hirsh concludes that "Kara Kush is not a story, it is the whole story – magnificently written in the blood of a courageous people. The overwhelming sense, after reading Shah's great testament, is that their story matters. So precious a nation must not lose this war."

Kirkus Review is less complimentary about Kara Kush, opining that it is "a disjointed, sprawling, rather nonpoetic tome about the Russian invasion of Afghanistan." The reviewer adds that Kara Kush is "wonderful on Afghan atmosphere, less successful as a novel", with too many characters and too little interplay between them, and concludes that the book is "a breezy read: impassioned, action-packed, and information-stuffed."

In The New York Times, author and retired columnist, C. L. Sulzberger expresses his difficulty as a reader in separating his literary judgement of the work, which he describes as "a bad novel", from the plight and "flamboyant heroism" of the Afghan people which the book presents.

The reviewer goes on to say that Shah clearly knows his country, its dialects, and the tribal traditions well, and has gone to great lengths to make himself familiar with the struggles of the Afghan rebels, the mujahideen, in their fight against the Soviet Union's occupation forces and their allies in the Afghan Government, based in Kabul. He adds that there is plenty of "action and movement" in the novel, and that the work presents a "rich tapestry", but concludes that the language employed is not up to the task, and that although it may be "a compendium of Pathan tales suitable to the storyteller's bazaar at Peshawar [...] it is not a novel."

Writing for the Pakistani Dawn newspaper, Nasser Yousaf states that Kara Kush provides "a fulfilling reading into the Afghan history, culture, geography and ethnology as the writer takes his readers on a tour de force of the snow–covered mountains, parched deserts, fecund vineyards and orchards, dense woods and dirt tracks of a country at war with a super power."

== See also ==
- The Idries Shah Foundation
