= Blå måndag =

2001 film by Anders Lennberg

- Directed by: Anders Lennberg
- Starring: Eva Röse; Göran Gillinger
- Release date: 2001
- Running time: 91 minutes
- Country: Sweden
- Language: Swedish

Blå måndag (Blue Monday) is a 2001 Swedish film directed by Anders Lennberg, starring Eva Röse and Göran Gillinger.

== Premise ==
Leo and Roger commit a burglary as usual. But it ends in disaster.
