= Caravan Film =

British film production company

Caravan Film is a London, UK based independent film production company headed by feature and documentary filmmakers Leon & David Flamholc. They produce both documentaries and feature films, as well as shorts and animation.

== Documentary films ==
- Search for the Lost Treasure of Afghanistan
- Sacred Sierra, the film
- House of the Tiger King, based on the Tahir Shah book by the same name
- Search for the Lost City of Gold
- Pro Stock Doc, the film
- Exorcism in Casablanca, an eyewitness documentary based on events from Tahir Shah's book The Caliph's House
- Looking at the Stars
- Svitjod 2000+
- I Believe
- Racist Sweden?
- A Winter in Herat
- Pulse, a series of four films set in Tel Aviv, Stockholm, London And Barcelona
- Cheeboom Cheeboom
- Radio Sweden, a series of three informational films, including: Run to The Rock, This is a Hold Up, My Name is Tomorrow

== Feature films ==
- Flip A Coin
- Sherdil
- Lithivm
- Nattbus 807
- Summertime

== Shorts & Animation ==
- Marauder
- Animation Showreel
