= Göran Gillinger =

Swedish actor and model

- Born: Anders Göran Gillinger; 13 February 1973 (age 53); Vaxholm, Sweden

Anders Göran Gillinger (born 13 February 1973) is a Swedish actor and former model. He has a broad background in classical theatre, television and film.

== Career ==
Gillinger was born in Vaxholm, Stockholm County in 1973. In 1993, at the age of 19, he was cast as Robert "Raspen" Thorstensson in the Swedish TV soap opera Rederiet. He left the role during the fourth season in 1994.

His first film role was a young beach boy in the Swedish comedy film Sune's Summer in 1994.

In 1995, he played the male lead, Adam, in the Swedish movie 30:e november. In 1996, he played Tobias in the Swedish sitcom En fyra för tre, with Björn Gustafson and Birgitta Andersson.

In 1999 he was accepted to The Royal Academy of Acting in Stockholm and graduated in June 2003 with a bachelor's degree. In 2001, he spent a semester at the Stella Adler Studio of Acting in Los Angeles. In 2005 he played one of the leads in the Swedish National Television series Kommissionen (The commission). In 2006 he played Horace in Molière's play The School for Wives at the Royal Dramatic Theatre in Stockholm. He also does voice-over work for Disney and DreamWorks among others, and is an approved Disney Director for dubbing.

In 2007 he performed at the Capital Fringe Festival in Washington, DC, in a one-man play A Swedish Tiger at the Woolly Mammoth Theatre. In 2008 he appeared in Alexander Burns' production of Hamlet at Carter Barron in Washington DC. In 2009 he played the neighbour in Ray Cooney's farce Run for your Wife at Mariebergskogen in Karlstad. In 2010 Gillinger was cast opposite Tate Donovan in the movie Below the Beltway directed by Dave Fraunces. He also returned to Sweden to appear as Erik, the male lead in the short Att bli med barn, which premiered at the Gothenburg Film Festival.

== Filmography ==
- 1992: Kl:k
- 1993: Sune's Summer
- 1993: Rederiet (TV series)
- 1995: 30:e november
- 1996: En fyra för tre (TV series)
- 1996: Cluedo – en mordgåta (TV series; guest role)
- 1997: Emma åklagare (TV series; guest role)
- 1997: OP7 (TV series)
- 2001: Blå måndag
- 2005: Kommissionen
- 2018: Ralph Breaks the Internet
- 2021: Space Jam: A New Legacy
