= The Scheherazade Foundation =

Cultural education company in England

- Official logo
- Formation: 23 Nov 2020
- Type: Cultural education and support CIC
- Headquarters: London, England.
- Founder and CEO: Tahir Shah
- Co-Founder: Ariane Shah
- Board of directors: Agustin Gonzalez; Ariane Shah; Jason Webster
- Website: Official website

The Scheherazade Foundation CIC is a non-profit community interest company (CIC) established in 2020 to support cultural education and intercultural bridge-building. It is based in London, England.

== Formation ==
The Scheherazade Foundation is a private, non-profit community interest company (CIC) established in 2020 by the writer and film-maker Tahir Shah and his daughter, Ariane Shah, to support cultural education and intercultural bridge-building. It is based in London, England. The company's registration number in the UK is 13038593.

The CIC is named after Scheherazade, the storyteller and main female character in the frame story of the collection of Middle Eastern tales, One Thousand and One Nights.

== Aims ==
The three main aims of The Scheherazade Foundation are:

- To seek to empower women – and in particular young women – who will step out into the world, becoming leaders and role models for future generations.
- To bridge cultures by striving towards shared values and know-how.
- To harness the teaching power of stories that has been a bedrock of the human experience since the dawn of civilization.

== Headquarters in Casablanca ==
In 2022, work began on renovating a one-acre, walled property, Dar Khalifa (The Caliph's House), in the Ain Diab district of Casablanca, to turn it into the headquarters of The Scheherazade Foundation. The property consists of a mansion with thirty rooms, built around an interior garden or riad.

According to Jason Webster in the Financial Times, Tahir Shah, who has previously written about his time in The Caliph's House, "hired artisans and craftsmen from across Morocco to work on fabulous zellij fountains, stucco screens with geometric Islamic designs, and intricately carved wooden Berber doorways."

== Activities ==
=== Repatriation of Ethiopian artefacts ===
In July 2021, The Scheherazade Foundation launched a crowdfunding appeal so that they could repatriate Ethiopian artefacts looted by British troops from Ethiopia in East Africa in 1868, following the Battle of Magdala. The crowdfunding enabled the foundation to purchase several items, including an imperial shield, handwritten Ethiopian religious texts, crosses, and a set of beakers, from a UK auction house and private dealers in Europe.

On 8 September 2021, the items were presented to the Ethiopian Ambassador, Teferi Melesse Desta by the foundation's chief executive officer, Tahir Shah, at a ceremony at London's Athenaeum Club. The embassy would then return the artefacts to the Ethiopian ministry of culture in the following weeks, the religious pieces being offered to the Ethiopian Orthodox Church and the rest most likely destined for the National Museum in the capital, Addis Ababa.

In a report in the Smithsonian Magazine, Dr. Alula Pankhurst, a member of Ethiopia's National Heritage Restitution Committee expressed hope that The Scheherazade Foundation's efforts would lead to further restitution initiatives, "especially at a time when retaining artefacts, notably human remains such as those of Prince Alemayehu in Windsor Chapel or sacred objects such as the holy Tabot Arks of the Covenant in the British Museum is becoming increasingly anachronistic, irrelevant and embarrassing."

The Scheherazade Foundation aims to repatriate more Ethiopian artefacts, and a reporter for Returning Heritage expressed the opinion that there is also a strong case "for returning the eleven sacred tabots, concealed within the vaults of the British Museum."

==== 2021 letter of appeal ====
Several attempts have been made in the past to get the British Museum to repatriate artefacts in its possession, but the museum had argued that it "is forbidden by the British Museum Act of 1963 to restitute objects in its collection". However, a new legal opinion commission by the Scheherazade Foundation and drawn up by Samantha Knights QC points out that the 1963 Act "has a provision that allows disposal of objects 'unfit to be retained' and that can be disposed 'without detriment to the interests of students'", and that since the artefacts have been kept in the museum's vaults for the past 150 years, without allowing their study, copying or photography, the artefacts are of "no apparent use or relevance to the museum" and would therefore "fall within this category."

On the basis of this new legal opinion, a letter was drawn up by the Scheherazade Foundation and sent to the trustees of the British Museum asking for the return of the eleven wood and stone tabots held there. Signatories to the appeal include seven members of the House of Lords including former deputy chief whip Don Foster, Baron Foster of Bath; actor and broadcaster Stephen Fry; actor Rupert Everett; author and broadcaster Lemn Sissay; former British Ambassador to Ethiopia Sir Harold Walker, and retired Archbishop of Canterbury George Carey. In a statement about the appeal, the museum said that "These documents need to be reviewed and addressed with full consideration, and more time is required before this can be looked at by trustees."

==== Further developments ====
In November 2021, Reuters confirmed that the artefacts acquired by The Scheherazade Foundation had been successfully returned to Ethiopia, and Ethiopia's tourism minister, Nasise Challa reported that, in addition, "we have started negotiations with the British Museum to bring back 12 tabots".

=== Storytelling and teaching stories ===
Tahir Shah comes from a family tradition of writers and storytellers, and he has studied traditional "teaching stories" for many years. These stories contain layers of deeper meaning, and Shah likens them to eating a fruit: "a pleasant experience that also contains a form of nutrition." One of the Scheherazade Foundation's main aims is to publish and disseminate these traditional tales, and also to host a storytelling festival at their headquarters, Dar Khalifa.

== Scheherazade Foundation Publishing ==
The Scheherazade Foundation is in the process of publishing a number of books on stories and storytelling:

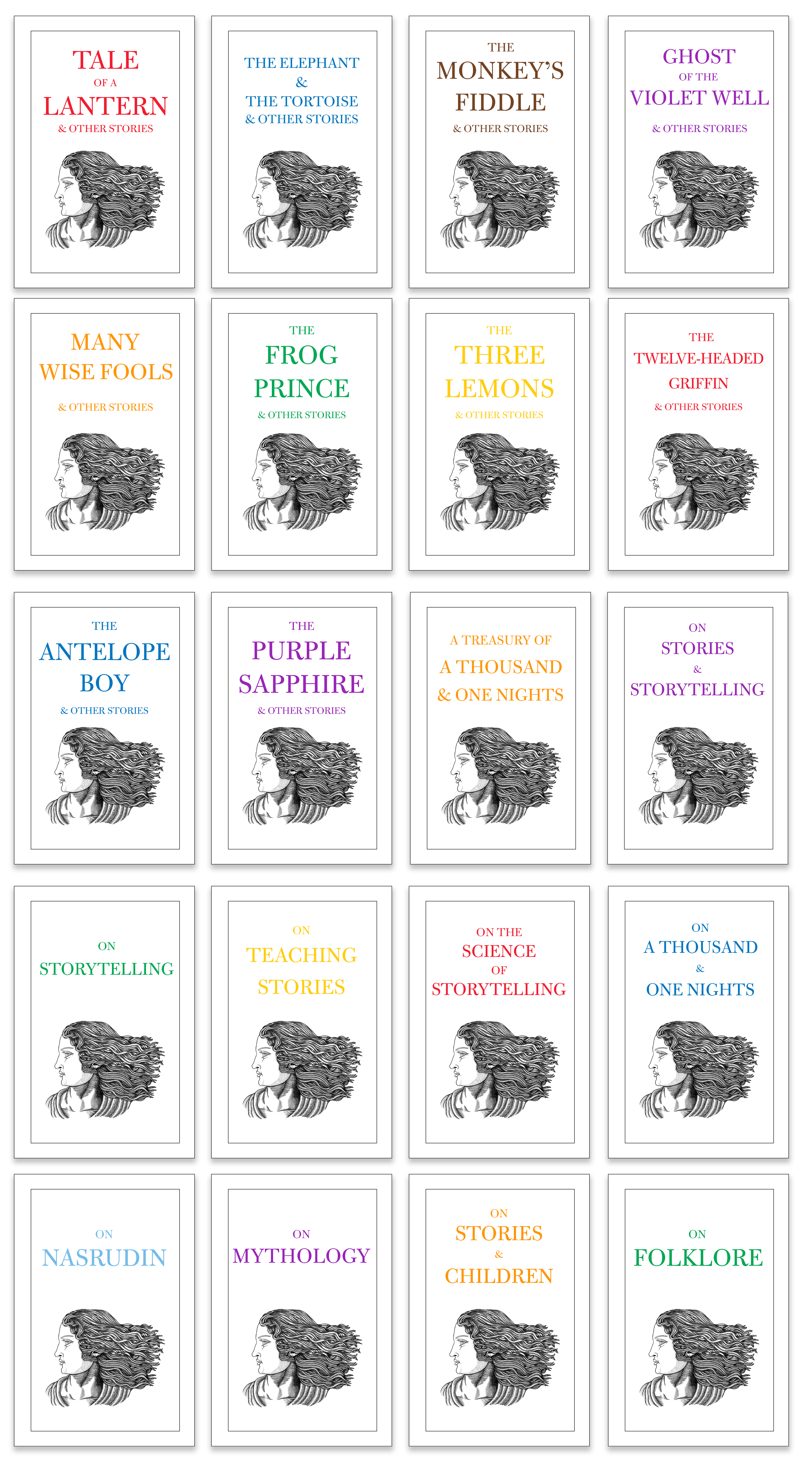
Covers of books published by The Scheherazade Foundation.

* The Secrets of Scheherazade, Scheherazade Foundation Publishing, 2022, ISBN 978-1-915311-01-6

- Tale of a Lantern and Other Stories, Scheherazade Foundation Publishing, 2022, ISBN 978-1-915311-03-0
- The Elephant and The Tortoise and Other Stories, Scheherazade Foundation Publishing, 2022, ISBN 978-1-915311-04-7
- The Monkey’s Fiddle and Other Stories, Scheherazade Foundation Publishing, 2022, ISBN 978-1-915311-05-4
- Ghost of the Violet Well and Other Stories, Scheherazade Foundation Publishing, 2022, ISBN 978-1-915311-06-1
- Many Wise Fools and Other Stories, Scheherazade Foundation Publishing, 2022, ISBN 978-1-915311-07-8
- The Frog Prince and Other Stories, Scheherazade Foundation Publishing, 2022, ISBN 978-1-915311-08-5
- The Three Lemons and Other Stories, Scheherazade Foundation Publishing, 2022, ISBN 978-1-915311-09-2
- The Twelve-Headed Griffin and Other Stories, Scheherazade Foundation Publishing, 2022, ISBN 978-1-915311-10-8
- The Antelope Boy and Other Stories, Scheherazade Foundation Publishing, 2022, ISBN 978-1-915311-11-5
- The Treasure of A Thousand and One Nights, Scheherazade Foundation Publishing, 2022, ISBN 978-1-915311-13-9
- On Stories and Storytelling, Scheherazade Foundation Publishing, 2022, ISBN 978-1-915311-14-6
- On Storytelling, Scheherazade Foundation Publishing, 2022, ISBN 978-1-915311-15-3
- On Teaching Stories, Scheherazade Foundation Publishing, 2022, ISBN 978-1-915311-16-0
- On The Science of Storytelling, Scheherazade Foundation Publishing, 2022, ISBN 978-1-915311-17-7
- On A Thousand and One Nights, Scheherazade Foundation Publishing, 2022, ISBN 978-1-915311-18-4
- On Nasrudin, Scheherazade Foundation Publishing, 2022, ISBN 978-1-915311-19-1
- On Mythology, Scheherazade Foundation Publishing, 2022, ISBN 978-1-915311-20-7
- On Stories and Children, Scheherazade Foundation Publishing, 2022, ISBN 978-1-915311-21-4
- On Folklore, Scheherazade Foundation Publishing, 2022, ISBN 978-1-915311-22-1
- Why the Fish Laughed & Other Stories, The Scheherazade Foundation, 2023, ISBN 978-1-915311-23-8
- Two Cats & Other Stories, The Scheherazade Foundation, 2023, ISBN 978-1-915311-24-5
- Three Stories, The Scheherazade Foundation, 2023, ISBN 978-1-915311-25-2
- The Twilight of the Gods & Other Stories, The Scheherazade Foundation, 2023, ISBN 978-1-915311-26-9
- The Son of Seven Queens & Other Stories, The Scheherazade Foundation, 2023, ISBN 978-1-915311-27-6
- The Moon Maiden & Other Stories, The Scheherazade Foundation, 2023, ISBN 978-1-915311-28-3
- The Metamorphosis & Other Stories, The Scheherazade Foundation, 2023, ISBN 978-1-915311-29-0
- The Celestial Sisters & Other Stories, The Scheherazade Foundation, 2023, ISBN 978-1-915311-30-6
- Tales From The Arabian Nights I, The Scheherazade Foundation, 2023, ISBN 978-1-915311-31-3
- East of the Sun, West of the Moon & Other Stories, The Scheherazade Foundation, 2023, ISBN 978-1-915311-32-0
- The Well at the End of the World & Other Stories, The Scheherazade Foundation, 2023, ISBN 978-1-915311-33-7

== See also ==
- Category:Shah family
