= En fyra för tre =

Swedish television series

- Genre: Sitcom
- Based on: Man About the House by: Johnnie Mortimer; Brian Cooke
- Directed by: Sven Strömersten-Holm
- Starring: Göran Gillinger; Lina Perned; Anna Jacobsson; Björn Gustafson; Birgitta Andersson
- Country of origin: Sweden
- Original language: Swedish
- No. of seasons: 4
- No. of episodes: 43

Production
- Running time: 25 minutes approx.

Original release
- Network: TV4
- Release: 6 February 1996 – 1997

Related
- Man About the House

En fyra för tre (One four-room flat for three) is a Swedish television series from 1996. It is based on the British sitcom Man About the House. The series was released on DVD in 2008.

== Cast ==
- Göran Gillinger as Tobias Hultgren
- Lina Perned as Kristin Asplund
- Anna Jacobsson as Jessica Persson
- Björn Gustafson as Lennart Björk
- Birgitta Andersson as Margareta Björk
- Robin Stegmar as Lasse
- Malena Laszlo as Johanna
- Håkan Palm as Harry
- Göran Ragnerstam as Bjarne and Vice Principal Tistlund

== Episodes ==
=== Season 1 ===
1. En karl i huset (A man in the house)
2. En fyra för mamma (A four-room flat for mum)
3. Hundslit (Dog drudgery)
4. Hyra på vift (Rent on the loose)
5. Blommande fjäll-Björk (Flowering mountain Björk (birch))
6. Egen härd är guld värd (One's own hearth is worth gold)
7. Bilturer (Road trips)
8. Extra-näck (Extra nude)
9. Tuffe Tobbe (Tough Tobbe)
10. Minnesluckan (The blackout)

=== Season 2 ===
1. Fågelkvitter (Bird chirping)
2. Tobbes verkliga jag (Tobbe's real self)
3. Lennart - förföraren (Lennart - the seducer)
4. Dubbelsnuva (Double cold)
5. Fördärvsarbete (Ruinous employment)
6. Ju fler kockar... (Too many cooks...)
7. Rådd att flyga (Advised to fly)
8. Spanska sjukan (The Spanish flu)

=== Season 3 ===
1. Maggans mystiska möte (Maggan's mystical meeting)
2. Däremellan kommer fastan (Lent comes in between)
3. Julgrannar (Christmas neighbours)
4. Presentproblem (Gift problems)
5. En brud för mycket (One bride too much)
6. Lennart buggar (Lennart is bugging)
7. Ung kärlek (Young love)
8. Sekten är värst (The sect is the worst)
9. Karriärliv (Career life)
10. Partypajaren (The party pooper)
11. Kära dagbok (Dear diary)
12. En övermogen kvinna (An overly mature woman)

=== Season 4 ===
1. Lisas comeback (Lisa's comeback)
2. Mutbrott (Bribery)
3. Stjärnsmällen (The star bang)
4. Syskonbädd (Sibling bed)
5. Jubelchock (The big shock)
6. En ding, ding värd (A mad, mad host)
7. Hjärtespalten (The heart column)
8. Bjarnes överman (Bjarne's defeater)
9. Obesvärad kärlek (Un-bothered love)
10. Kvinnofällan (The women trap)
11. Flyttgröt (Move porridge)
12. Livräddarna (The life savers)
13. Babyjoller (Baby babble)
