= Jakob Eklund =

Swedish film, television and stage actor

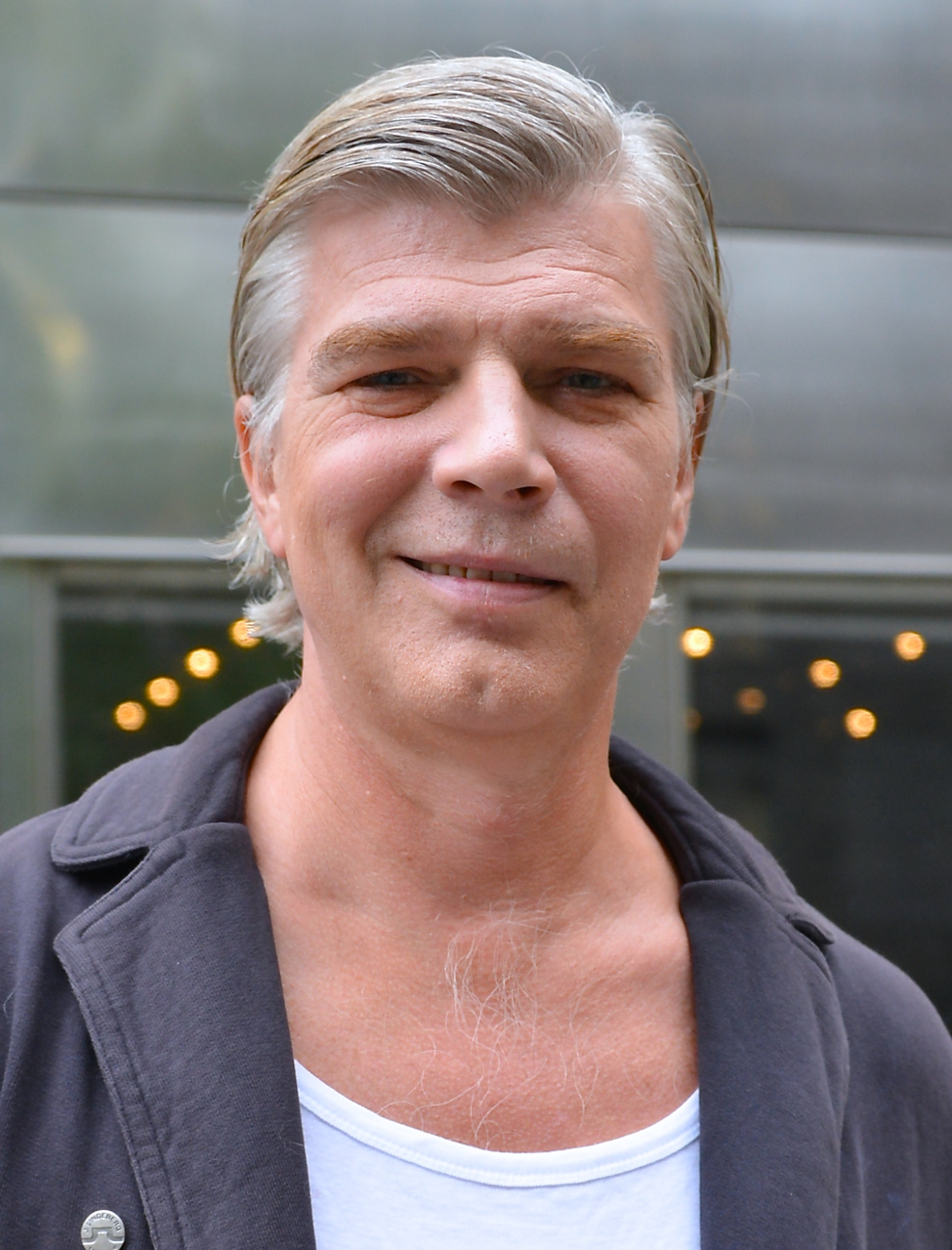
- Jakob Eklund in 2013.
- Born: Jakob Anders Eklund; 21 February 1962 (age 63); Gothenburg, Sweden
- Occupation: Actor
- Years active: 1988—present
- Spouse: Marie Richardson (m. 2008)
- Children: 2

Jakob Anders Eklund (born 21 February 1962) is a Swedish film, television and stage actor. He portrayed the fictional police officer Johan Falk in 20 movies.

His wife, Marie Richardson, played his on-screen girlfriend in the trilogy of films The Third Wave, Executive Protection and Zero Tolerance, as well as in the other 17 films about Johan Falk, released between 2009 and 2015.

== Selected filmography ==
- 2008 - Les Grandes Personnes
- 2003 - Daybreak
- 2003 - The Third Wave
- 2001 - Executive Protection
- 1999 - Zero Tolerance
- 1994 - House of Angels – The Second Summer
- 1993 - The Ferris Wheel
- 1992 - House of Angels

== Television ==
- Tusenbröder (2003, 2003, 2006)
- Wallander The Joker (2005)
- August (2007)
- Cold Courage (2020)
- The Machinery (2020)
