= Johan Falk =

Swedish film series

- First appearance: Noll tolerans
- Last appearance: Slutet
- Portrayed by: Jakob Eklund

In-universe information
- Occupation: Police
- Nationality: Swedish

Johan Falk is a Swedish film series about a fictional police officer named Johan Falk, played by Jakob Eklund. It consists of 20 films that were released between 1999 and 2015. Fifteen of these films were released directly on DVD.

The last five films were shot in Gothenburg and Stockholm in the summer and autumn of 2014, and premiered in the summer of 2015.

== List of films ==
The Trilogy (feature films)

- Noll tolerans (1999) - Zero Tolerance
- Livvakterna (2001) - Executive Protection
- Tredje vågen (2003) - The Third Wave

Season 1

- GSI - Gruppen för särskilda insatser (2009) - Special Operations Group
- Vapenbröder (2009) - Brothers in Arms
- National Target (2009)
- Leo Gaut (2009)
- Operation Näktergal (2009) - Operation Nightingale
- De Fredlösa (2009) - The Outlawed

Season 2

- Spelets Regler (2012) - Rules of the Game
- De 107 Patrioterna (2012) - The 107 Patriots
- Alla Råns Moder (2012) - Mother of All Robberies
- Organizatsija Karayan (2012)
- Barninfiltratören (2012) - The Child Infiltrator
- Kodnamn Lisa (2012) - Codename Lisa

Season 3

- Ur askan i elden (2015) - Out of the Frying-pan into the Fire
- Tyst diplomati (2015) - Silent Diplomacy
- Blodsdiamanter (2015) - Blood Diamonds
- Lockdown (2015)
- Slutet (2015) - The End
