= Johan Widerberg =

Swedish actor

- Born: 1974 (age 51–52); Stockholm, Sweden
- Occupations: Actor; screenwriter
- Years active: 1976–present
- Parent: Bo Widerberg

Johan Widerberg (born 1974) is a Swedish actor.

== Biography ==
Johan Widerberg was born in Stockholm, the son of Swedish director Bo Widerberg.

He is known for having starred in All Thing Fair, directed by his father.

He was cast as a part in Ocean's Twelve which the director Steven Soderbergh, in the final script, had to cut out. Eventually, Johan turned out as an extra in the film.

== Filmography (selected) ==
- Mannen från Mallorca (The Man from Majorca) (1984)
- Ormens väg på hälleberget (The Serpent's Way) (1986)
- Ebba och Didrik (1990) (TV series)
- Polismördaren (The Police Murderer) (1994)
- Rapport till himlen (Report to Heaven) (1994) TV mini-series
- Lust och fägring stor (All Things Fair) (1995)
- Radioskugga (1995) (Guest in TV series)
- Svart, vitt, rött (1996)
- Juloratoriet (Christmas Oratorio) (1996)
- Selma & Johanna - en roadmovie (1997)
- Lithivm (1998)
- Under solen (1998)
- Gossip (2000)
- Norrmalmstorg (2003) (TV)
- Ocean's Twelve (2004)
- Så olika (2009)
- A Man Called Ove (2015)
- The Wife (2017)
- Mending Hugo's Heart (2017)
- Bäckström (2020)
- The Sandhamn Murders (2022/2024)
- To Cook a Bear (2025)
