= Rose Mary Salum =

Rose Mary Salum has authored 10 books. She is the founder of the award-winning bilingual magazine Literal Magazine. She is also the founder of Literal Publishing, a bilingual publisher house. She has taught as a visiting professor at the University of Iowa, Rice University, and Saint Thomas University.She is a member of the Academia Norteamericana de la Lengua Española. Her essays and fiction are included in an array of anthologies: Diáspora (Vaso Roto, 2017), Lados B, Narrativa de alto riesgo (Nitro Press, 2016), The Body Subject & Subjected (Sussex Academy Press, 2015), Stirred Ground: Non-Fiction Writing by Contemporary Latina and Latin American Women Authors (Hostos Review, 2015), Cruce de fronteras: Antología de escritores Iberoamericanos en Estados Unidos (SubUrbano, 2013), Poéticas de los (dis)locamientos (Dislocados, 2012), Raíces latinas, narradores y poetas inmigrantes (Vagón azul, 2012), America nuestra: antología de narrativa en español en Estados Unidos (Linkgua, 2011), Professions (MLA, 2009), among others. Her books have been translated to Italian, Bulgarian, Portuguese, Thai and English.

== Books ==
- Medio Oriente en México. Antología de escritores de origen árabe (LP, 2025)
- Donde el río se toca (Sudaquia, 2022)
- Otras lunas (Libros del sargento, 2022)
- Tres semillas de granada. Ensayos desde el inframundo (Vaso Roto, 2020)
- Una de ellas (Dislocados, 2020)
- The Water That Rocks the Silence (Forthcoming)
- El agua que mece el silencio (Vaso Roto, 2015)
- Delta de las arenas, cuentos árabes, cuentos judíos (Literal Publishing, 2013)
- Almalafa y Caligrafía, Literatura de origen árabe en América Latina (Hostos Review)
- Spaces in Between (2006)
- Entre los espacios (Tierra Firme, 2004)

== Awards and recognition ==
- Florida Book Awards (2020, Bronze Medal)
- Top Ten Houston Women (2018)
- Premio Panamericano Carlos Montemayor (2017)
- International Latino Book Award (2016)
- Top 35 Latinos
- International Latino Book Award (2014),
- [Mujeres Destacadas Award (2014)
- Author of the Year 2008 by the Hispanic Book Festival (2018),
- Classical Award by Saint Thomas University (2006),
- A Recognition by the Congress of the United States (2005) (Congreso_de_los_Estados_Unidos)
- A Runner up for the PEN America's Nora Magid Award
