= Sector 236 – Thor's Wrath =

- Directed by: Björne Hellquist; Robert Pukitis
- Written by: Björne Hellquist
- Produced by: Björn Ericson; Lars Lundgren
- Starring: A.R. Hellquist; Daniel Janzen; Tina Ericksson; Fredrik Dolk; Lars Lundgren
- Music by: Jan Johansen; Fredrik Blom
- Release date: 2010
- Running time: 90 minutes
- Country: Sweden
- Language: Swedish
- Budget: 300.000 kr

Sector 236 – Thor's Wrath (Swedish: Sektor 236 - Tors vrede) is a 2010 Swedish horror science fiction film. It was produced by Swedish stuntman Lars Lundgren who also was the main stunt coordinator. Lundgren had previously worked as a stuntman in films such as Planet of the Apes and Thriller - A Cruel Picture.

== Plot ==
A platoon of Swedish Mountain Rangers goes missing in the remote military sector 236 - nicknamed since the Viking age Thor's Wrath. The Swedish government sends captain Palmquist and a special force to investigate. Joining them is the American agent and scientist Johnson. Meanwhile, a group of teenagers goes to hike in the area. Their phones suddenly lose reception and the compass stops working. Soon, they are killed off one by one by an unseen force. At the headquarters, the Swedish Colonel Stag realises that the American has lied about what he believes to hide in sector 236. He sets out to save his soldiers from walking into a bloodbath.

== Cast ==
- A.R. Hellquist as Captain Hellquist
- Daniel Janzen as John
- Tina Ericksson as Ylva
- Björn Ericson as Steven
- Rickard Green as Micheal
- Fredrik Dolk as Col. Stag
- Lars Lundgren as Agent Johnson
- Natasha Semenets as Pia
- Tintin Anderzon as Karin Westin
- Jan Johansen as Agent Roth
- Viktoria Hedberg as Sofie
- Daniela Miteska as Lt. Luthman
- Åke Jansson as General Rickert
- Mikael Bergåse as Patrik
- Hippe Man as Johan Gunnarsson
- Emma Sundstedt as The Creature
- Magnus G. Bergström as Torsten Brinkel
- Magnus Dahl as Soldier 1
- Ulrika Forberg as Soldier 2
- Fredrik Blom as Soldier 3
