= Marie Richardson =

Swedish actress (born 1959)

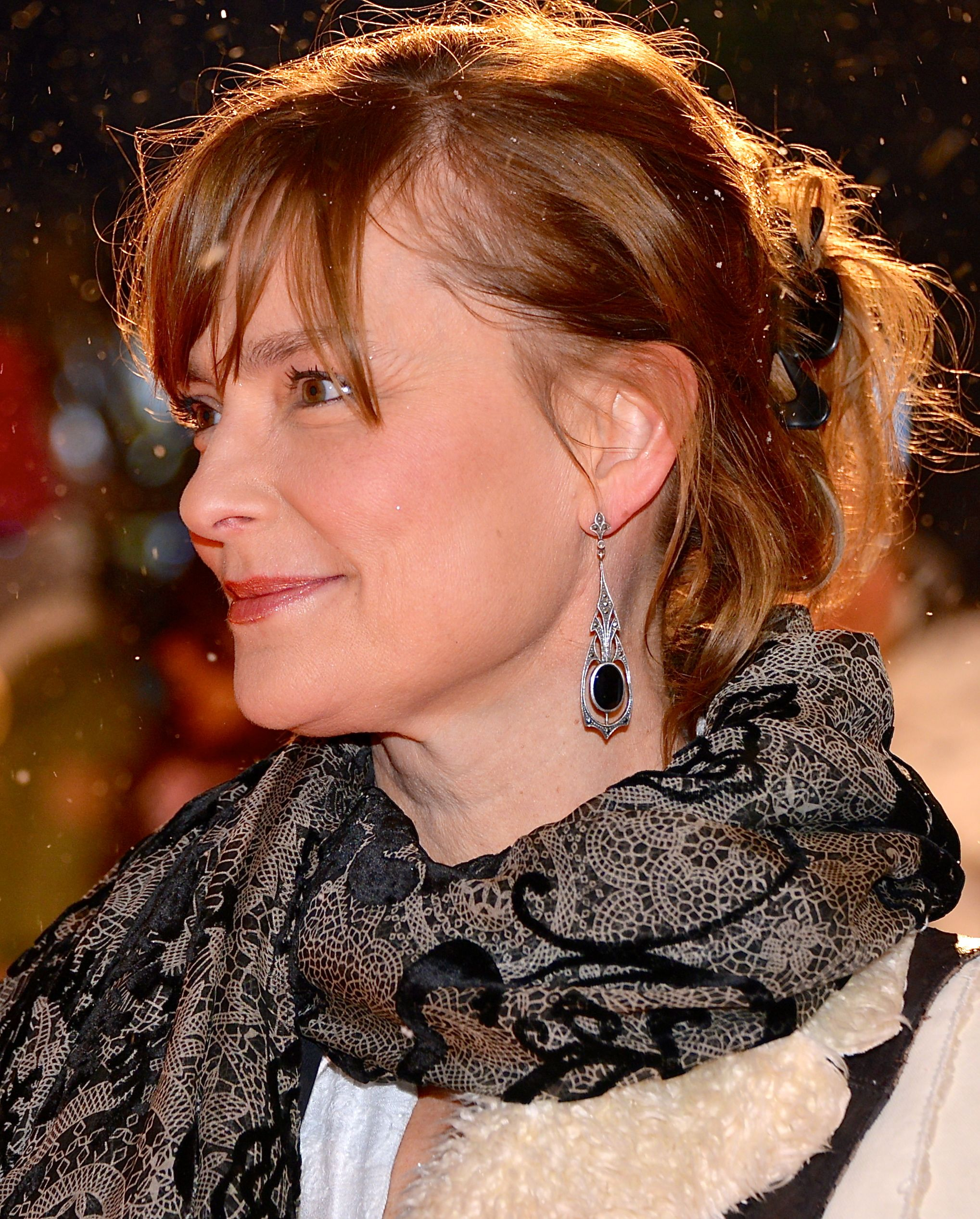
- Richardson in 2012.
- Born: Marie Elisabet Richardson; 6 June 1959 (age 67); Ljusdal, Sweden
- Occupation: Actress
- Years active: 1985—present
- Spouse: Jakob Eklund (m. 2008)
- Children: 2

Marie Elisabet Richardson (born 6 June 1959) is a Swedish stage, film, and television actress. She studied at the Teaterhögskolan i Stockholm from 1982 to 1985 and has been employed by The Royal Dramatic Theatre in Stockholm ever since. Richardson has been very active in films and television production as well as on stage for 30 years. She has two children with Jakob Eklund, also an actor.

In 2008 Richardson played Linda Jacobsson, the psychologically tormented wife of an obsessive violent politician (played by Reine Brynolfsson), in the Swedish mini-series The Regicide. The series was based on a novel written by Danish author Hanne Vibeke Holst. In December 2014, Richardson appeared in the Swedish television (SVT) series Blue Eyes and on stage at The Royal Dramatic Theatre in Stockholm in Mirja Unga's play Johanna, a modern take on the Joan of Arc theme. In 2017 and 2019 she was the lead character in the SVT series Before We Die.

== Filmography ==
Year	Title	Role	Notes
1991	Riktiga män bär alltid slips	Mona	
1991	Önskas	Anita	
1992	The Best Intentions	Märta Werkelin	
1992	Sunday's Children	Marianne	
1993	The Telegraphist	Elise Mack	
1993	Härifrån till Kim	SYO	
1993	Polis polis potatismos	Helena Hansson	
1994	Pillertrillaren	Rico's Mistress	
1997	In the Presence of a Clown	Pauline Thibualt	TV movie
1999	Eyes Wide Shut	Marion Nathanson	
1999	Noll Tolerans	Helén Andersson	
2000	Det blir aldrig som man tänkt sig	Gina	
2000	Faithless	Anna Berg	
2001	Gossip	Cecilia Falck	
2001	Livvakterna	Helén	
2002	Den 5:e kvinnan	Maya Thysell	4 episodes
2002	Alla älskar Alice	Lotta Lindberg	
2003	Ondskan	Erik's Mother	
2003	Emma och Daniel: Mötet	Sara	
2003	Den Tredje Vågen	Helén	
2003	Om jag vänder mig om	Sofie	
2003	Mannen som log (The Man Who Smiled)	Maja Thysell	2 episodes
2005	Steget efter (One Step Behind)	Maja Thysell	
2005	Mouth to Mouth	Ewa	
2006	Brandvägg (Firewall)	Maja Thysell	2 episodes
2007	Wallander, Pyramiden	Maja Thysell	
2008	Oskyldigt Domd	Ulrika Stiegler	TV series
2009	Oskyldigt Domd	Ulrika Stiegler	TV series
2009	Johan Falk – Gruppen för särskilda insatser	Helén	
2011	Någon annanstans i Sverige	Anki	
2012	Johan Falk: Kodnamn: Lisa	Helén Falk	
2013	Shed No Tears	Lisbeth Lindén	
2013	Stockholm Stories	Lena Melling	
2017-2019	Innan vi dör (Before We Die)	Hanna Svensson	18 episodes
2022	Food and Romance	Karin	
