= All Things Fair =

1995 film

- Theatrical release poster
- Directed by: Bo Widerberg
- Written by: Bo Widerberg
- Produced by: Per Holst
- Starring: Johan Widerberg; Marika Lagercrantz; Tomas von Brömssen; Karin Huldt; Nina Gunke; Kenneth Milldoff; Björn Kjellman; Frida Lindholm
- Cinematography: Morten Bruus
- Distributed by: Columbia TriStar Films AB
- Release date: 3 November 1995
- Running time: 130 minutes
- Country: Sweden
- Language: Swedish
- Budget: 25 million DKK
- Box office: $2 million (Sweden)

All Things Fair (Swedish: Lust och fägring stor, literally "Desire and Great Beauty") is a 1995 Swedish period drama film, written and directed by Bo Widerberg as his final film. It tells the story of a sexual relationship between a teacher and her 15-year-old student in Malmö, Sweden during World War II. Widerberg's son Johan stars as the boy Stig and Marika Lagercrantz plays his teacher Viola. The original title is taken from the Swedish hymn "Den blomstertid nu kommer", which is traditionally sung in schools before closing for the summer holiday.

All Things Fair was released to cinemas in Sweden on 3 November 1995. The film won several domestic and international awards and was nominated for the Academy Award for Best Foreign Language Film.

== Plot ==
In 1943 in the midst of World War II, Stig is a 15-year-old boy in his third year at a Malmö school, having moved with his family to the area from Stockholm two years prior. He is close with his older brother Sigge, a boxer who will soon be leaving for duty on the front lines. One day during class, Stig gets into trouble for passing notes and is asked by his teacher Viola to stay behind. She demands to see the note, which reveals the boys' ignorance about sex in embarrassing detail. As punishment, Viola has Stig wash the blackboard and get rid of the flies in the classroom. Stig develops an attraction to the married Viola and feigns an interest in her collection of dictionaries as an excuse to be around her. Viola reciprocates Stig's affections and soon they embark on an affair. Stig and Viola's husband, Kjell, happen to both be at Viola's home one day and Stig is spotted by Kjell before he can make an escape. Kjell, a salesman, is not angry at Stig and does not appear to suspect the boy of anything, assuming him to be a tutee of his wife. Kjell and Stig begin to form an easy bond over classical music, a pastime Stig's father has no appreciation for.

Meanwhile, Stig's neighbor and classmate Lisbet takes a liking to him and tries to learn the Stockholm dialect via radio to get his attention. Sigge sends Stig letters from aboard the submarine Ulven written in a special code between the two siblings. One day Kjell catches Stig walking around his house in a robe, and Stig is forced to come clean. It is revealed Kjell knew of the affair the whole time, but is unable to do anything about it. Kjell confesses his marital problems with Viola stem from his own infidelity shortly after their wedding, with the relationship not improving thereafter. Kjell's friendship with Stig continues, but his alcoholism becomes more apparent to the boy and he starts to question his relationship with Viola.

After a family party, Lisbet leads Stig to her bedroom and offers her virginity to him. Stig is flustered, prompting the naked Lisbet to leave, hurt by his perceived lack of interest. Later, he tries to make amends to Lisbet and sneaks into the girls' locker room at school, hiding inside a vault. He manages to get her attention from inside, and Lisbet happily climbs in with him to consummate their feelings in secret. Stig later hears an alarming radio update about a submarine explosion. He anxiously checks his letter from Sigge which confirms he was aboard the same submarine. A devastated Stig keeps the news to himself at first, but his mother deduces what has happened.

Lisbet is at the local cinema where Stig is a concessions worker. Searching for Stig, she walks in on him having sex with Viola in a storage closet. Lisbet is disgusted and rejects Stig's apologies. Stig goes to Viola's house intending to break things off with her, but she has been drinking and is in an emotional state since being caught by Lisbet. Viola refuses to talk with him and the boy ends up succumbing to her. Later, Viola tells Stig after class one day that she has decided to fail him because he didn't pass her class. Stig knows the real reason is because of their relationship and his desire to end it. He threatens to tell the authorities about them but Viola counters that no one would believe his account. On the last day of the school year, Stig is informed by the school principal he will indeed be repeating a grade. Stig goes to get Viola's grade book from her classroom but finds all the pages for his record have been ripped out. At the same moment, a plane approaches the school, which is celebrating its last day, and dumps fuel on the school grounds, causing injury to some students.

Stig attends the funeral for his brother and his fellow submariners with his parents. On the train ride back home, Stig's mother, unaware of her son's affair with Viola, expresses regret at not writing notes to the school to excuse Stig's bad grades and poor attendance. She believes his school performance has been hampered by working late nights at the cinema and because of the strain of Sigge's military service. She starts to suspect there was something more to Stig's school woes, but Stig stops her and says he will tell her the whole story someday when she's older. Stig visits Kjell and pleads with the man to help him clear his name and academic record, but Kjell remains passive and ineffectual. During the ceremony where Viola is handing out school reports to students, Stig barges in and walks right up to her, denouncing her by showing his genitals and not taking his report. The film ends with Stig exiting the school, carrying all the dictionaries he has stolen from Viola's desk with him in a suitcase.

== Cast ==
- Johan Widerberg as Stig Santesson
- Marika Lagercrantz as Viola
- Tomas von Brömssen as Kjell, "Frank"
- Karin Huldt as Lisbet
- Björn Kjellman as "Sigge" Santesson
- Kenneth Milldoff as Stig's father
- Nina Gunke as Stig's mother
- Peter Nilsson as Class prefect
- Jossi Sabbah as Isidor "Isse" Blecher
- Linus Ericsson as Peter
- Magnus Andersson as "Trötter"
- Frida Lindholm as Olga
- Monica Stenbeck as Gym teacher
- Per-Olov Månsson as Cinema owner
- Sigge Cederlund as Projectionist
- Frida Sjö as Lina
- Thomaz Ransmyr as the man at the cinema.

== Reception ==
=== Box office ===
The film grossed $2.3 million in Sweden during 1996.

=== Critical reception ===
Writing for Variety, critic Gunnar Rehlin praised the performances, writing "As the boy, Johan Widerberg (in reality 21, and an experienced actor) is at his best to date under his father's direction. As Viola, Lagercrantz again shows herself to be one of Sweden's most versatile actresses". However, Rehlin also said the "pic falls short in developing some of its characters and side plots. It would, for instance, have been interesting to learn more about the boy's parents, their inner lives and reactions to events".

Critic Adrian Martin wrote of the film, "…this is a solely male rite-of-passage tale, in which Stig's acquisition of knowledge and experience occurs at the expense of the woman who charitably helps him get there. When Stig's jilted and outraged young girlfriend Lisbet (Karin Huldt) flees in a huff, I found myself applauding her good sense – but I also wished she would return to the movie and even up the gender score a little".

=== Awards and nominations ===
The film was awarded the Special Jury Prize Silver Bear and the Blue Angel Award at the 46th Berlin International Film Festival and the Audience Award at Gothenburg Film Festival. It also won the awards for Best Actor (Johan Widerberg) at the Rouen Nordic Film Festival and Best Actress (Marika Lagercrantz) at Festroia International Film Festival.

At the Guldbagge Awards, the film won in three categories: Best Film, Best Direction and Best Supporting Actor (Tomas von Brömssen). Johan Widerberg and Marika Lagercrantz were nominated for Best Actor and Best Actress respectively. It was also nominated for the Academy Award for Best Foreign Language Film at the 68th Academy Awards.

== See also ==
- List of submissions to the 68th Academy Awards for Best Foreign Language Film
- List of Swedish submissions for the Academy Award for Best International Feature Film
