= Sergio Missana =

Chilean author (born 1966)

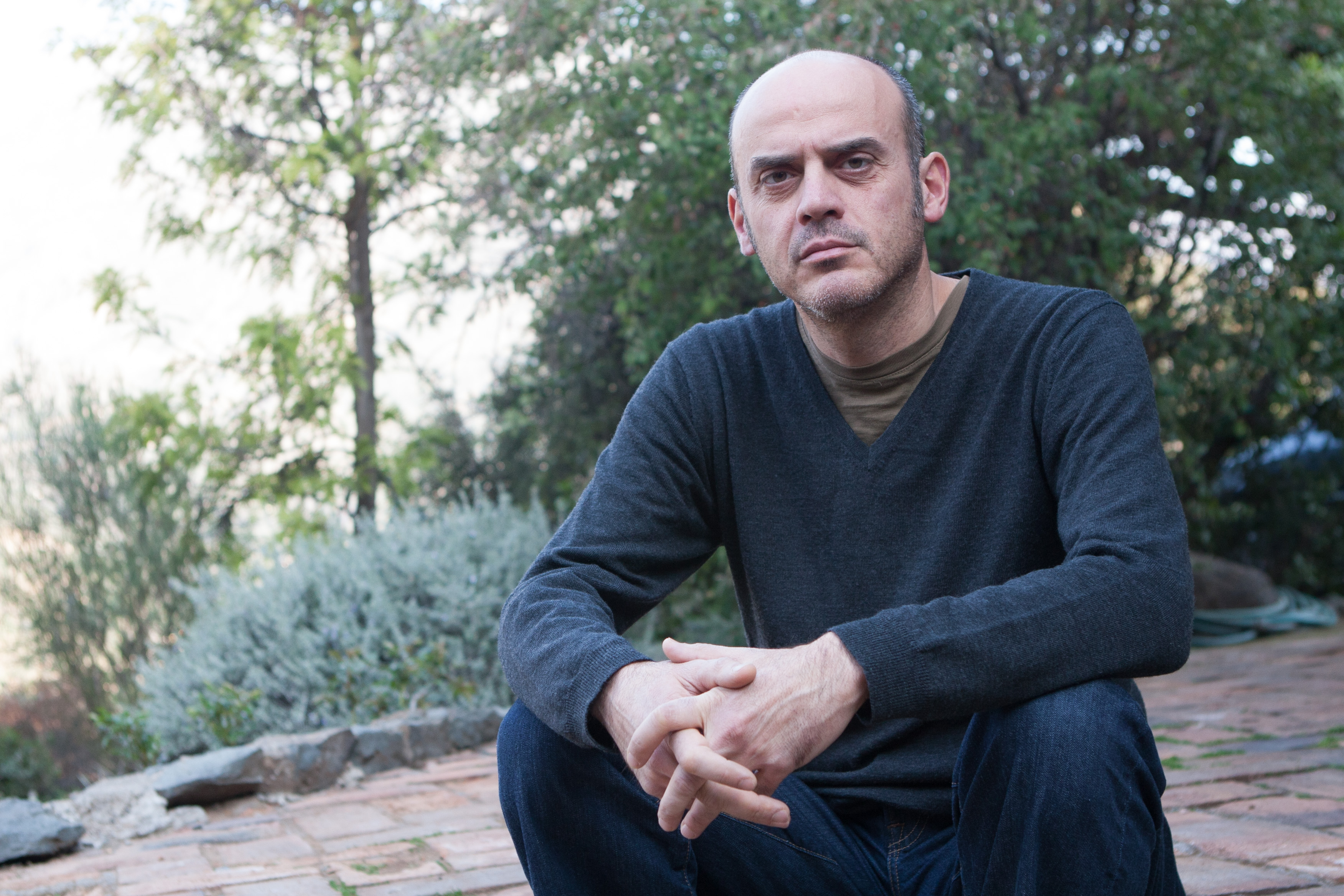
- Born: 1966 (age 59–60); Chile
- Occupations: Novelist, journalist, professor, climate activist

Sergio Missana (born 1966) is a Chilean novelist, journalist, scholar, editor, scriptwriter and environmental advocate. He is a professor of Latin American literature at the Stanford University Overseas Studies Program in Santiago, Chile, and Secretary-General of the Climate Parliament, an environmental NGO.

== Biography ==
Missana is the author of seven novels: El invasor (The Invader), 1997; Movimiento falso (False Movement), 2000, a finalist for the Rómulo Gallegos International Novel Award in 2001; La calma (The Calm), 2005; El día de los muertos (The Day of the Dead), 2007; Las muertes paralelas (The Transentients), 2010; El discípulo (The Disciple), 2014; and Entremuros (Ghost Town, 2019). He published the critical study La máquina de pensar de Borges (Borges’ Thinking Machine), based on his dissertation at Stanford University, in 2003, the collection of essays La distracción (Distraction) in 2015, and the essay Última salida: Las humanidades y la crisis climática (Last Exit: The Humanities and the Climate Crisis) in 2021. In 2012 he co-authored Lugares de paso, a collection of travel pieces, with photographer Ramsay Turnbull. He published, with his daughter Maya (b. 2001), the children's books Luis el tímido (Shy Luis), 2008, Boris y las manzanas (Boris and Apples), 2011, and El gallo loco (The Crazy Rooster), 2013. With his daughter Sofía (b. 2004), he published No es justo (It's Not Fair), 2014, and No es mi culpa (It's Not My Fault), 2019.

Missana holds an MA and a PhD in Spanish from Stanford University. He earned a BA in Social Communications and a Professional Degree in Journalism from the University of Chile. He currently teaches Latin American literature at the Stanford University Overseas Studies Program in Santiago, Chile.

Between 2002 and 2006, Missana served as Director of Publications and Head of International Relations at the BBVA Foundation in Madrid, Spain, and as member of the Governing Council of the European Foundation Centre (EFC), based in Brussels. He was editor-in-chief of Chilean music magazine Rock & Pop (1994–95). In 2007, he co-wrote the award-winning animated TV series for children Chilian Geografic, which raised awareness of Chilean endangered animal species. He is currently Secretary-General at the Climate Parliament, an international NGO that combats climate change by promoting the transition to renewable energy.

His journalistic work includes over fifty articles on literature, film, music, travel, art, design, culture and science. He has published articles and reviews in Revista Santiago (Chile), PRL (U.S.), Fractal (Mexico), Literal Magazine (U.S.), La Tercera (Chile), El Mercurio (Chile), Planet (U.S.), Pausa Magazine of the National Council of Culture and the Arts (Chile), Paula (Chile) and Rock & Pop (Chile), among other publications.

He divides his time between Madrid and Santiago, Chile. He lives with his wife, Ramsay Turnbull.

== Works ==
=== Novels ===
- El invasor (The Invader), Planeta, 1997.
- Movimiento falso (False Movement), Lom, 2000; Era, 2002. A Finalist of the Rómulo Gallegos International Novel Award, 2001.
- La calma (The Calm), Sudamericana, 2005.
- El día de los muertos (The Day of the Dead), Fondo de Cultura Económica, 2007.
- Las muertes paralelas, Era, 2010; Seix Barral, 2011. The Transentients, McPherson, 2021 (Translated by Jessica Powell).
- El discípulo (The Disciple), Seix Barral, 2014.
- Entremuros (Ghost Town), Hueders, 2019; Ediciones Lastarria y De Mora, 2022.

=== Travel ===
- Lugares de paso (Passing Through), photographs by Ramsay Turnbull, Lom, 2012.

=== Essays ===
- La máquina de pensar de Borges (Borges’ Thinking Machine), Lom, 2003.
- La distracción (Distraction), Universidad Alberto Hurtado, 2015.
- Última salida: Las humanidades y la crisis climática (Last Exit: The Humanities and the Climate Crisis), Laurel/Bookmate, 2021.

=== Children’s books ===
- Luis el tímido (Luis the Shy Elephant), with Maya Missana, Alfaguara, 2008.
- Boris y las manzanas (Boris and Apples), with Maya Missana, Alfaguara, 2011.
- El gallo loco (The Crazy Rooster), with Maya Missana, SM, 2013.
- No es justo (It's Not Fair), with Sofía Missana, SM, 2014.
- No es mi culpa (It's Not My Fault), with Sofía Missana, SM, 2019.

=== Scriptwriting ===
- Chilian Geografic, animated series about Chilean endangered animal species, Chilevisión, 2007.
