= Mimi Hirsh =

American novelist

Mary Elizabeth "Mimi" Hirsh
- Born: 1947/8; Waltham, Massachusetts
- Died: 8 April 2016 (aged 68); Boston, Massachusetts
- Occupations: Press aide; novelist; champion of cultural causes in Boston, MA
- Spouse: David Montenegro
- Writing career
- Pen name: M.E. Hirsh

Mary Elizabeth Hirsh, better known as Mimi Hirsh (1947/8 – 8 April 2016) was an American novelist who wrote under the pen name, M.E. Hirsh. She was born in Waltham, Massachusetts and raised in nearby Newton.

Hirsh is best known for her "critically-acclaimed" novel Kabul and Dreaming Back, and for her work in championing cultural causes in Boston's South End.

== Personal life ==
The fourth of six siblings, Mimi Hirsh was born in Waltham, Massachusetts and raised in nearby Newton, attending Catholic schools and then Boston College where she became an editor for the student magazine, The Heights. Her father, Edward Hirsh had been the chairman of the English Department at Boston College, and her mother, Margaret (née Kelly) had worked as an administrator at Newton-Wellesley Hospital, a community teaching medical centre in Newton.

Hirsh met her future husband, poet and composer, David Montenegro in 1980 and married him in 1985. They shared a studio work space at Boston Center for the Arts. She spent most of her adult life in Boston's South End, moving to Dorchester in Boston around 2014.

Ms. Hirsh died aged 68 on Friday 8 April 2016 at Beth Israel Deaconess Medical Center in Boston, after a brief illness, due to complications from an ulcer.

== Career ==
Until around 1986, shortly after her father died, Hirsh worked as a press aide to the welfare commissioner in the state government. Though Hirsh told the Boston College magazine, at the time, that she loved this work, with its politics, writing and excitement, she wrote that she "was about to turn 30 and mortality loomed large" and that she "didn’t want to dodder off into the sunset mumbling about the novels I could have written if I'd tried."

In 1986, Hirsh had her first novel set in Afghanistan, Kabul published, followed in 1993 by Dreaming Back, which was set in New Mexico and drew its title from a passage by poet W. B. Yeats: "In the Dreaming back, the Spirit is compelled to live over and over again the events that had most moved it."

== Reception ==
The Boston Globe described Hirsh's stories, and her own decision to devote herself to writing, as "layered in nuance and context."

=== Kabul ===
Kirkus Reviews expressed the opinion that Kabul is "A meaty, invigorating, politically speculative first novel—with a rich ambiance of place and mores, the drama of dusty perils and rumbling tanks, and a clutch of giant family members—intelligent, aching and doomed."

Wendy Smith, in The New York Times was satisfied with the factual background presented in Kabul, but was of the opinion that the principal characters are too "spoiled and egocentric", and that though this may be historically accurate, the author fails to "elicit our sympathy for such unappealing characters."

Theodore L. Eliot Jr., who was United States Ambassador to Afghanistan from 1973 to 1978, replied to the review in The New York Times. Eliot stated that he had been asked to read the book and check the accuracy of historical facts. He refuted the reviewer's assertion that the last pre-Communist government had "collapse[d] in corruption", and stated that M. E. Hirsh had written no such thing. Eliot defended the author, saying that he "found her treatment of the overthrow of that government impressively sensitive to the subtle forces that were in play." He added that the author "does a fine job of portraying the tensions felt by younger, middle-class Afghans, torn between their sense of duty and responsibility to a traditional culture and their modern values (women's rights, for example) derived from their exposure to the West."

Debra Denker, reviewing the book for the Los Angeles Times described it as engrossing, dramatic, excellently researched, and tightly woven, though – for her – some elements, such as strings of coincidences, strained credulity. The reviewer pointed out that "fiction can often make remote realities more immediate, and M. E. Hirsh's novel is a heartfelt and commendable attempt to personalize and make sense of the Machiavellian intrigues leading up to the 1979 Soviet invasion of Afghanistan."

Author, reporter and columnist Marjorie Williams, writing in The Washington Post, said that "it is Kabul's chief virtue that it is the genuine article—the fully imagined, closely researched, energetically written story fixed in a·distinctive place and time," and that though the book is "inconsistently dramatic, [...] it's never hard to pick up, and often hard to put down." Williams was, however, of the opinion that the scenes set in Afghanistan, which occupy half the book, are not as successful as those set in Moscow and New York.

=== Dreaming Back ===
Reviewing Dreaming Back, Kirkus Reviews wrote: "The links between CIA experiments with LSD back in the 50s and superconductors that could revolutionalize contemporary computer technology are slow to emerge in this dense, opaque story, but the weighty sense of individual consequence is well worth the wait. Smaller in scale than Kabul (1986) but just as resonant."

Publishers Weekly expressed the opinion that "Readers who want a straightforward, gripping yarn are advised to look elsewhere; those interested in the issues Hirsh raises—and able to bear the prose's intermittent elliptical pretentiousness—may find this mystery-with-a-message worth their while."

== Works ==
=== Novels ===
- Kabul ISBN 0312301731 (Atheneum, 2 June 1986)
- Dreaming Back ISBN 0312097891 (Atheneum, 11 October 1993)

=== Reviews ===
- Kara Kush by Idries Shah (Los Angeles Times, 24 August 1986)
- Soviet Expansion in the Third World: Afghanistan: A Case Study by Nasir Shansab (Los Angeles Times, 28 June 1987)
