= Zero Tolerance (1999 film) =

- DVD cover
- Directed by: Anders Nilsson
- Written by: Anders Nilsson; Joakim Hansson
- Produced by: Björn Carlström; Joakim Hansson
- Starring: Jakob Eklund; Peter Andersson; Marie Richardson
- Music by: Bengt Nilsson
- Distributed by: Sonet Film
- Release date: 29 October 1999 (Sweden)
- Running time: 108 minutes
- Country: Sweden
- Language: Swedish

Zero Tolerance (Swedish: Noll tolerans) is a Swedish action film which was released to cinemas in Sweden on 29 October 1999, directed by Anders Nilsson. It is the first film in the series about police officer Johan Falk (Jakob Eklund) and is followed by Executive Protection in 2001 and The Third Wave in 2003.

== Plot ==
Johan Falk, a Gothenburg police officer and former member of Nationella insatsstyrkan, gets involved in a shooting on Christmas Eve. He saves the life of a little girl but is then drawn into a stream of events and he ends up being the accused. In the search for the truth he sees no other way than to take the law into his own hands, and becomes hunted by his own colleagues.

== Cast (selection) ==
- Jakob Eklund - Johan Falk
- Peter Andersson - Leo Gaut
- Lennart Hjulström - Ola Sellberg
- Sonny Johnson - Thorsen
- Marie Richardson - Helen Andersson
- Fredrik Dolk - Peter Kroon
