= The Third Wave (2003 film) =

- Swedish cover
- Directed by: Anders Nilsson
- Written by: Joakim Hansson; Anders Nilsson
- Produced by: Peter Possne
- Starring: Jakob Eklund; Nicholas Farrell; John Benfield; Ben Pullen; Marie Richardson; Irina Björklund; Lennart Hjulström
- Distributed by: Sandrew Metronome
- Release date: 2003
- Running time: 115 min.
- Country: Sweden
- Language: Swedish

The Third Wave (Swedish: Den tredje vågen) is a Swedish action film from 2003 directed by Anders Nilsson and starring Jakob Eklund. It is the third film in the series about police officer Johan Falk (Jakob Eklund), the first two being Zero Tolerance (Noll tolerans) and Executive Protection (Livvakterna). Falk has not worked in the year since the events of the second film, but on a trip with his family in central Europe he is contacted by his former boss again. "An entire continent is being stolen."

== Plot ==
Phoenix Kane is a mobster. His live-in girlfriend, Rebecca, discovers his illegal money laundering and tries to leave him. He half-strangles her to keep her quiet, but is hit by a car as he leaves. While he is taken to the hospital, Rebecca escapes England. For his protection, Kane orders her captured and returned to England and his control, not knowing one of his cohorts has ordered a hit on her if she talks to the police.

Falk has not worked for some time. He meets his former boss, who now is part of Europol leading an organized crime task-force, in a Dutch restaurant and refuses a job offer. When he leaves, Rebecca meets with the former boss, offering information in exchange for protection. Falk returns to the restaurant just as hitmen, disguised as police, kill Falk's ex-boss and try to take out Rebecca.

Falk returns fire and sneaks her to safety. They escape the hitmen, but are overtaken by a security team from Kane with orders to return her to England. They don't believe Rebecca when she insists she'll be killed if she goes back, but when Kane tracks them down and his hitmen shoot some of the security men, they go rogue and help her.

In Munich, Kane has set up a big money deal at a local bank. Falk, his pregnant girlfriend Helen, Rebecca and two uninjured security men head there to stop him. Falk wants to bug Kane's hotel room using cell phones, but because of street rioters, only Helen has credentials that persuade the police to let her in. She bugs the room but can't leave the hotel because rioting has worsened.

The hitmen, who had earlier lost them, see her and deduce where their quarry is. They catch Helen when she sneaks from the hotel and use her to compel Falk to turn over Rebecca. Falk refuses, hoping to find a way to save Helen without getting Rebecca killed. Helen succeeds in escaping her captor, but freezes in the street when she sees a hit man shoot Falk, disabling him.

Meanwhile Rebecca goes to the bank to confront Kane and learns he didn't arrange the hit on her. She shoots and kills the cohort who did. One hit man sees her and, dressed as a riot policeman, forces his way in, killing Kane in the effort to kill Rebecca. The hitman is himself killed.

The second hitman shoots Falk in the head and prepares to kill a distraught Helen, using a dead policeman's gun after his own gun jams. Instead, Falk kills him, saving Helen, still alive since the cop's gun had held only rubber bullets.

Falk attends the funeral for his former boss—wearing a policeman's uniform.

== Cast ==
- Jakob Eklund as Johan Falk
- Irina Björklund as Rebecca
- Ben Pullen as Kane
- Nicholas Farrell as Devlin
- Sylvester Groth as Dauphin
- Marie Richardson as Helén
- Lennart Hjulström as Sellberg
- John Benfield as Stevens
- Pierre Deny as Leblanc
- Robert Giggenbach as Sorensen
- Emmanuel Limal as Rocca
