= 30:e november =

- Directed by: Daniel Fridell
- Written by: Daniel Fridell
- Produced by: Daniel Fridell; Peter Cartriers
- Starring: Göran Gillinger; Ray Jones IV
- Music by: Niklas Strömstedt; Wille Crafoord; Tomas Ledin
- Release date: 10 March 1995
- Running time: 116 minutes
- Country: Sweden
- Languages: Swedish, Spanish

30:e november (English: 30 November) is a Swedish film released to cinemas in Sweden on 10 March 1995.

== Plot ==
The plot starts with Adam and a gang of white power skinheads setting a reception center for asylum-seekers on fire. One of those fleeing the center is Julia from Peru, and for Adam, it is love at first sight. Despite the title of the film, it takes place in the middle of summer, around the National Day of Sweden, 6 June. However, 30 November is a date when Swedish neo-Nazis have often organized marches commemorating King Charles XII.

== About the film ==
The film has since aired on Sveriges Television and TV4, and was released on video in September 1995. The TV and video versions run at 111 minutes. It is a reinterpretation of Romeo and Juliet, mostly scene for scene.
