= Executive Protection (film) =

2001 film by Anders Nilsson

Livvakterna
- Swedish DVD cover
- Directed by: Anders Nilsson
- Written by: Anders Nilsson; Joakim Hansson
- Produced by: Joakim Hansson
- Starring: Jakob Eklund; Samuel Fröler; Alexandra Rapaport; Lia Boysen; Christoph M. Ohrt
- Music by: Bengt Nilsson
- Release date: 17 August 2001 (Sweden)
- Running time: 112 minutes
- Country: Sweden
- Language: Swedish

Executive Protection (Swedish: Livvakterna, meaning "The Bodyguards") is a Swedish action film from 2001 directed by Anders Nilsson. It is the second film in the series about police officer Johan Falk (Jakob Eklund), the first being Zero Tolerance.

== Plot summary ==
Sven Persson (Samuel Fröler), who owns a textile company in Estonia, hires Nikolaus Lehman (Christoph M. Ohrt) to take care of local gangsters who are attempting to pressure Persson into paying 'protection' money. To Persson's surprise and shock, Lehman takes care of the problem by killing the gangsters and demands a share of the company's profit. A threatened Persson seeks out his old friend and police officer Johan Falk (Jakob Eklund), who has been assigned a desk job as a disciplinary action by his superiors.

Falk realizes that the police can't do anything to protect Persson and his family, and seeks out a security company run by Mårtenson (Krister Henriksson) and Pernilla (Alexandra Rapaport). They agree to help Persson and Falk is offered a job at the company, which he quickly accepts.

== Cast (partial) ==
- Jakob Eklund as Johan Falk
- Samuel Fröler as Sven Persson
- Alexandra Rapaport as Pernilla
- Lia Boysen as Jeanette Persson, Sven Persson's wife
- Christoph M. Ohrt as Nikolaus Lehman
- Marie Richardson as Helén, Johan Falk's girlfriend
- Krister Henriksson as Mårtenson
- Fredrik Dolk as Kroon
