= Literal (magazine) =

- Founder & Director: Rose Mary Salum
- Categories: Latin American culture
- Frequency: Quarterly
- Founded: 2004
- Country: United States; Mexico; Canada
- Language: English, Spanish
- Website: literalmagazine.com
- ISSN: 1551-6962

Literal: Latin American Voices is a quarterly cultural magazine focusing on art, architecture, literature, politics, culture, writers, intellectualism and current world events. It publishes most of its articles in both English and Spanish. It distributes nationwide in Mexico, the United States and Canada.

== History ==
Literal was founded in 2004 by Rose Mary Salum. Its purpose is to provide a medium for the critique and diffusion of the Latin American literature and art, recognizing its potential strength as a point of departure for understanding.

== Reception and awards ==
Literal has won 2 Council of Editors of Learned Journals (CELJ) Awards and four Lone Star Awards.

== Chief editors ==
- Rose Mary Salum.
- David Medina Portillo
