= David Flamholc =

Swedish filmmaker (born 1974)

- Born: David Lew Flamholc; 27 September 1974 (age 50); Stockholm, Sweden
- Occupations: film director; producer; screenwriter
- Years active: 1991–present
- Website: caravanfilm.co.uk

David Flamholc (born 27 September 1974) is a Swedish filmmaker and director. He lives in London and works through his company, Caravan Film, together with his father, Leon Flamholc.
