= Fourth Way =

Gurdjieff's approach to self-development

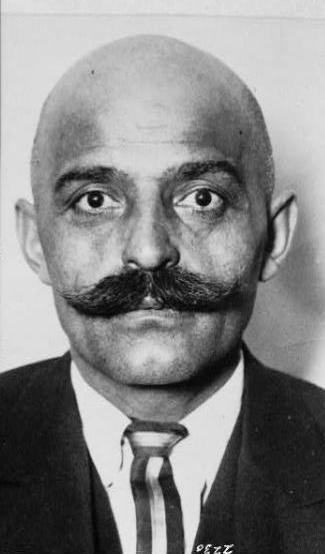
George Gurdjieff, developer of the Fourth Way practice

The Fourth Way is spiritual teacher George Gurdjieff's approach to human spiritual growth, developed by him over years of travel in the East (c. 1890 – 1912), and taught to followers in subsequent years. Gurdjieff's students often refer to the Fourth Way as "The Work" or "Work on oneself". The exact source of his teaching is unknown, but Gurdjieff indicated that the knowledge was known to man in the past and he had gathered it from attending various monasteries and from meetings with remarkable men. The term "Fourth Way" was used by his pupil P. D. Ouspensky in his book In Search of the Miraculous, which provides a detailed account of Gurdjieff's teaching as it was conveyed directly to him; and also in his own lectures and writings. After Ouspensky's death, his students published a book entitled The Fourth Way based on his lectures. According to Ouspensky, the three traditional schools, or ways, "are permanent forms which have survived throughout history mostly unchanged. Where schools of Fakirs, Monks and Yogis exist, they are barely distinguishable from religious schools. The fourth way differs in that "it is not a permanent way. It has no specific forms or institutions and comes and goes controlled by some particular laws of its own."

When this work is finished, that is to say, when the aim set before it has been accomplished, the fourth way disappears, that is, it disappears from the given place and in its given form and continues perhaps in another place in another form. Schools of the fourth way exist for the needs of the work which is being carried out in connection with the proposed undertaking. They never exist by themselves as schools for the purpose of education and instruction.

The Fourth Way addresses the question of humanity's place in the Universe and the possibilities of inner development. It emphasises that people ordinarily live in a state referred to as a semi-hypnotic "waking sleep," while higher levels of consciousness are possible.

The Fourth Way teaches how to develop and focus attention and energy in various ways, so as to help a person awake and to minimize daydreaming and absent-mindedness. This inner development in oneself is the beginning of a possible further process of change, whose aim is to transform man into "what he ought to be."

== Overview ==
=== The teaching ===
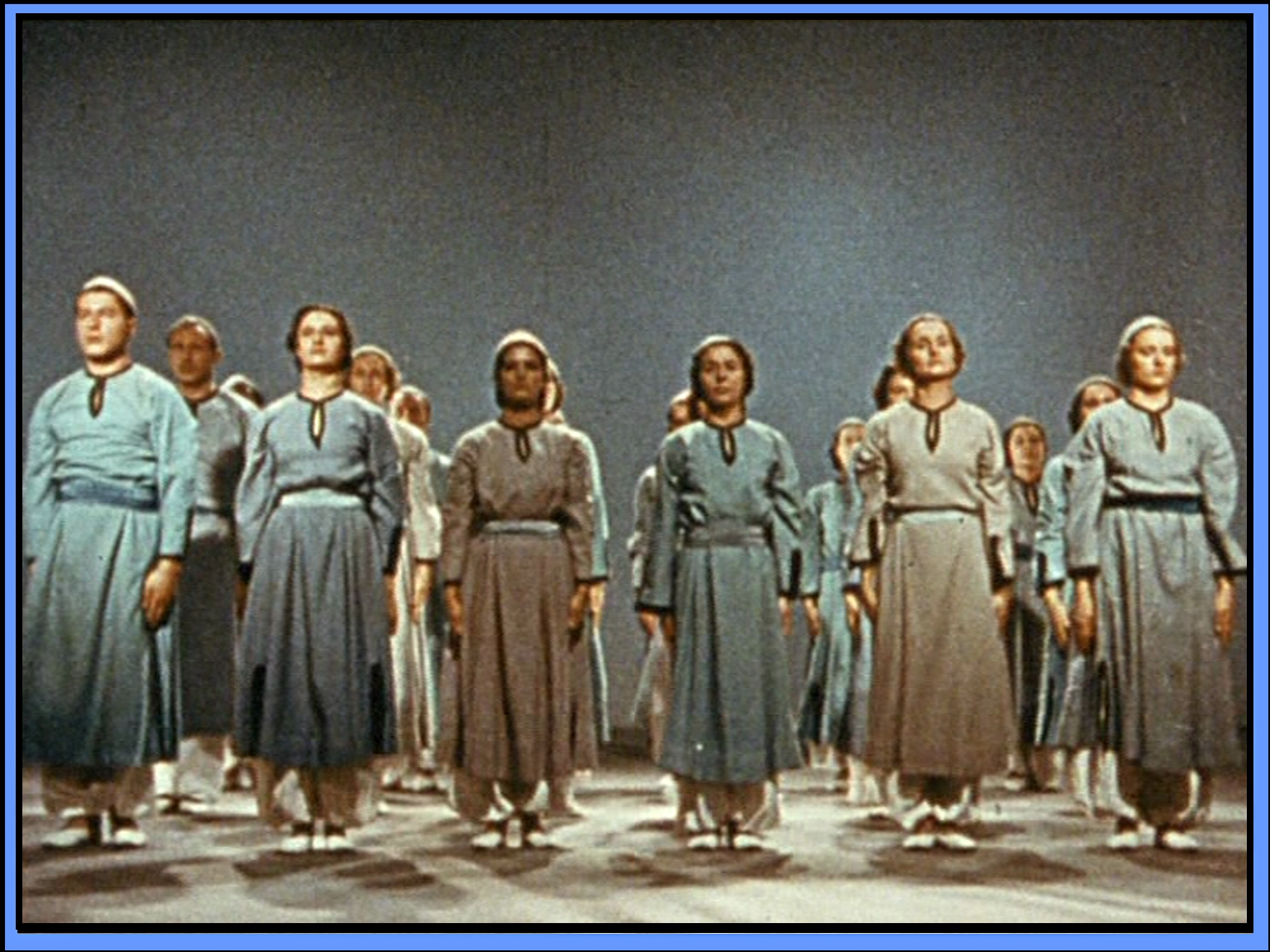
Gurdjieff Movements

Gurdjieff said, "The teaching whose theory is here being set out is completely self supporting and independent of other lines and has been completely unknown up to the present time."

The Fourth Way teaches that the potential for developing the seed of a soul that a person is born with becomes stifled by personality and remains dormant, leaving one not really awake to oneself, despite believing that one is. A person can however wake up and sense the reality of their existence and live as a human being ought to be so as to develop a soul in the course of time - or alternatively remain asleep until their death. People are born asleep, live in sleep, and die in sleep, only imagining that they are awake. The ordinary waking "consciousness" of human beings is not consciousness at all, but merely a form of sleep."

Gurdjieff taught "sacred dances" or "movements", now known as Gurdjieff movements, which were performed together as a group.

Ouspensky documented Gurdjieff as saying that "two or three thousand years ago there were yet other ways which no longer exist and the ways then in existence were not so divided, they stood much closer to one another. The fourth way differs from the old and the new ways by the fact that it is never a permanent way. It has no definite forms and there are no institutions connected with it." Ouspensky quotes Gurdjieff that there are fake schools and that "It is impossible to recognize a wrong way without knowing the right way. This means that it is no use troubling oneself how to recognize a wrong way. One must think of how to find the right way."

=== Assessment and analysis / after Gurdjieff's death ===
Gurdjieff's followers believed he was a spiritual master, a human being who is fully awake or enlightened. He was also seen as an esotericist . He agreed that the teaching was esoteric but claimed that none of it was veiled in secrecy but that many people lack the interest or the capability to understand it.

After Gurdjieff's death in 1949 a variety of groups around the world have attempted to continue The Gurdjieff Work. The Gurdjieff Foundation, was established in 1953 in New York City by Jeanne de Salzmann in cooperation with other direct pupils.

He left a body of music, inspired by that which he had heard in remote monasteries and other places, which was written for piano in collaboration with one of his pupils, Thomas de Hartmann.

The Fourth way was influenced by Tibetan Buddhism, according to Jose Tirado, and Chatral Rinpoche alleged that Gurdjieff spent several years in a Buddhist monastery in the Swat valley.

== Teachings and teaching methods ==
=== Basis of teachings ===
- Present here now
- We do not remember ourselves
- Conscious labour – is an action where someone who is performing an act is present to what is being done; not absentminded. At the same time to strive to perform the act more efficiently.
- Intentional suffering – is the act of struggling against automatism such as daydreaming, pleasure, food (eating for reasons other than real hunger), etc. In Beelzebub's Tales, Gurdjieff states that "the greatest 'intentional suffering' can be obtained in our presences by compelling ourselves to endure the displeasing manifestations of others toward ourselves" According to Gurdjieff, conscious labour and intentional suffering were the basis of all evolution of man.
- Self-Observation – observation of one's behavior and habits. To observe thoughts, feelings, and sensations without judging or analyzing what is observed.
- The Need for Effort – Gurdjieff emphasized that awakening results from consistent, prolonged effort. Such efforts may be made as an act of will after one is already exhausted.
- The Many 'I's – this indicates fragmentation of the psyche, the different feelings and thoughts of 'I': I think, I want, I know best, I prefer, I am happy, I am hungry, I am tired, etc. These have nothing in common with one another and are unaware of each other, arising and vanishing for short periods of time. Hence someone usually has no unity in the self, wanting one thing now and another, perhaps contradictory, thing later.

=== Centers ===
Gurdjieff classified plants as having one center, animals two and humans three. Centers refer to apparatuses within a being that dictate specific organic functions. There are three main centers in a man: intellectual, emotional and physical, and two higher centers: higher emotional and higher intellectual.

Body, Essence and Personality

Gurdjieff divided people's being into Essence and Personality.

- Essence – is a "natural part of a person" or "what they are born with"; this is the part of a being which is said to have the ability to evolve.
- Personality – is everything artificial that they have "learned" and "seen".

Cosmic Laws

Gurdjieff focused on two main cosmic laws, the Law of Three and the Law of Seven.

- The Law of Seven is described by Gurdjieff as "the first fundamental cosmic law". This law is used to explain processes. The basic use of the law of seven is to explain why nothing in nature and in life constantly occurs in a straight line, that is to say that there are always ups and downs in life which occur lawfully. Examples of this can be noticed in athletic performances, where a high ranked athlete always has periodic downfalls, as well as in nearly all graphs that plot topics that occur over time, such as the economic graphs, population graphs, death-rate graphs and so on. All show parabolic periods that keep rising and falling. Gurdjieff claimed that since these periods occur lawfully based on the law of seven that it is possible to keep a process in a straight line if the necessary shocks were introduced at the right time. A piano keyboard is an example of the law of seven, as the seven notes of the major scale correspond exactly to it.
- The Law of Three is described by Gurdjieff as "the second fundamental cosmic law". This law states that every whole phenomenon is composed of three separate sources, which are Active, Passive and Reconciling or Neutral. This law applies to everything in the universe and humanity, as well as all the structures and processes. The Three Centers in a human, which Gurdjieff said were the Intellectual Centre, the Emotional Centre and the Moving Centre, are an expression of the law of three. Gurdjieff taught his students to think of the law of three forces as essential to transforming the energy of the human being. The process of transformation requires the three actions of affirmation, denial and reconciliation. This law of three separate sources can be considered modern interpretation of early Hindu Philosophy of Gunas, We can see this as Chapters 3, 7, 13, 14, 17 and 18 of Bhagavad Gita discuss Guna in their verses.

How the Law of Seven and Law of Three function together is said to be illustrated on the Fourth Way Enneagram, a nine-pointed symbol which is the central glyph of Gurdjieff's system.

=== Use of symbols ===
In his explanations Gurdjieff often used different symbols such as the Enneagram and the Ray of Creation. Gurdjieff said that "the enneagram is a universal symbol. All knowledge can be included in the enneagram and with the help of the enneagram it can be interpreted... A man may be quite alone in the desert and he can trace the enneagram in the sand and in it read the eternal laws of the universe. And every time he can learn something new, something he did not know before." The Enneagram is often studied in contexts that do not include other elements of Fourth Way teaching.

== Institute for the Harmonious Development of Man ==
Having migrated for four years after escaping the Russian Revolution with dozens of followers and family members, Gurdjieff settled in France and established his Institute for the Harmonious Development of Man at the Château Le Prieuré at Fontainebleau-Avon in October 1922. The institute was an esoteric school based on Gurdjieff's Fourth Way teaching. After nearly dying in a car crash in 1924, he recovered and closed down the institute. He began writing All and Everything. From 1930, Gurdjieff made visits to North America where he resumed his teachings.

Ouspensky relates that in the early work with Gurdjieff in Moscow and Saint Petersburg, Gurdjieff initially forbade students from writing down or publishing anything connected with Gurdjieff and his ideas. Gurdjieff said that students of his methods would find themselves unable to transmit correctly what was said in the groups. Later, Gurdjieff relaxed this rule, accepting students who subsequently published accounts of their experiences in the Gurdjieff work.
