= Olgivanna Lloyd Wright =

Montenegrin-American dancer (1898–1985)

- Born: Olga Ivanovna Lazović; December 27, 1898; Cetinje, Montenegro
- Died: March 1, 1985 (aged 86); Scottsdale, Arizona, U.S.
- Occupation: Dancer
- Spouses: Vladimar Hinzenberg (m. 1917, divorced) Frank Lloyd Wright (m. 1928; died 1959)
- Children: 2
- Relatives: Marko Miljanov (grandfather)

Olgivanna Lloyd Wright (December 27, 1898 – March 1, 1985) was the third and last wife of the architect Frank Lloyd Wright. They met in November 1924 and married in 1928. Together they established the Taliesin Fellowship, an architectural apprentice programme and the Frank Lloyd Wright Foundation. After Frank's death in 1959, Olgivanna became president of the foundation, a position she held until one month before her own death.

== Early life ==
Olga Ivanovna (also known as Olgivanna) Lazović was born on December 27, 1898, in Cetinje, Montenegro.

Her parents were Jovan Lazović, who served as Montenegro's first Chief Justice, and Milica Markov Popović, the daughter of Field Marshal Marko Miljanov, a Montenegrin writer, voivode, and leader of the Kuči tribe. Milica enlisted as a volunteer in the Serbian Army, pretending to be a man. Olgivanna was the youngest of five children, with two brothers and two sisters. When her father lost his sight, Olgivanna would read court documents to him. When she was 9, Olgivanna went to live with her sister Julia and her husband, Constantin Siberakov, in Russia.

== Career ==
In Russia, Olgivanna met Vladimar Hinzenberg. They married in 1917, when Olgivanna was 19.

In 1917, following the birth of her daughter Svetlana, Olgivanna met G. I. Gurdjieff. She left Hinzenberg and Svetlana to follow Gurdjieff to France. Olgivanna spent roughly seven years working with Gurdjieff. She began as his student, learning Gurdjieff movements, which she later taught to her own students, including Diana Huebert. In 1923, while in France, Olgivanna nursed Katherine Mansfield on her deathbed.

In August 1924, Gurdjieff was involved in a car accident. He encouraged Olgivanna to go to the United States to join Hinzenberg and Svetlana, who was at her brother's home in New Jersey. After a short while, Olgivanna realized that the marriage was over, so she went to Chicago and taught Gurdjieff movements to the children of her friends. In late November 1924, she met Frank Lloyd Wright at a Sunday matinee featuring dancer Tamara Karsavina. Wright wrote about this chance meeting her in the 1943 edition of his autobiography:

In a sentence or two she criticized Karsavina from our point of view, showing unusual familiarity with dancing and dancers. No longer quite so strange, the emissary of Fate, mercy on my soul, from the other side of the known world, bowed her head to my invitation to tea at the nearby Congress. She accepted with perfect ease and without artificial hesitation.

I was in love with her.

It was as simple as that.

Both were married, but they quickly began a romantic relationship, and Olgivanna and Svetlana came to live with Wright at Taliesin, in Wisconsin. By February 1925, Olgivanna was pregnant with their daughter, Iovanna. In April 1925, an electrical fire destroyed Taliesin's living quarters. Wright's estranged second wife refused to divorce Wright. In October 1926, Olgivanna and Wright were arrested in Tonka Bay, Minnesota, and accused of violating the Mann Act, but the charges were later dropped. Wright got a divorce in 1927. He and Olgivanna married on August 25, 1928, in Rancho Santa Fe, California, and honeymooned in Phoenix.

=== The Taliesin Fellowship ===
In 1932, Frank and Olgivanna started the Taliesin Fellowship, an architectural apprentice program.

In his book Apprentice to Genius: Years With Frank Lloyd Wright, Edgar Tafel wrote that the "marriage to Olgivanna was a tremendous stabilizing element for [Wright] — her devotion and strength brought his genius forward again. She knew how to take care of him." The last quarter-century of Wright's life (1935–59), when he, Olgivanna and the Taliesin Fellowship spent their winters in Arizona building Taliesin West, have been argued to be his most productive.

Tafel, who was in the Fellowship from 1932 to 1941, also wrote that Olgivanna's background with Gurdjieff and his Institute for the Harmonious Development of Man

gave her the background to organize the operation of Taliesin and to bring another dimension to the life of the Fellowship. In this way, her experience with Gurdjieff did influence the form of the Fellowship and some of the activities envisioned from the beginning. Mrs. Wright was the force that kept the Fellowship in working order, from the very start. A remarkable woman.

Olgivanna continued to run the Taliesin Fellowship after Wright's death in 1959.

In 1970, she invited Svetlana Alliluyeva, the youngest child and only daughter of Joseph Stalin, to Taliesin West, the winter compound of the Taliesin Fellowship. Alliluyeva met William Wesley "Wes" Peters there. They married three weeks later and stayed married for 20 months. (Peters had previously been married to Olgivanna's daughter Svetlana, who died in a car accident in 1946.) Alliluyeva came away with a less-than-glowing impression of Olgivanna and her management of Taliesin:

Mrs. Wright's word was law. She had to be adored and worshipped and flattered as often as possible; flowers sent by mail and presented by hand she enjoyed and encouraged. She gave advice to the architects, guided a drama circle, a dance group and a choir, and counselling on private lives and relationships, expecting everyone to make personal confessions to her. She was a "spiritual leader" and self-appointed minister, preaching on Sunday mornings on matters of God and man.

== Death ==
Olgivanna died in Scottsdale, Arizona, on March 1, 1985 at the age of 86. She had arranged for Wright's body to be removed from its Wisconsin grave. It was then "cremated, mixed with her ashes and used in the walls of a memorial garden" at Taliesin West.

== Bibliography ==
=== Books by Olgivanna Lloyd Wright ===
Olgivanna Lloyd Wright wrote a weekly newspaper column starting in the 1950s titled "Our House". The newspaper columns were published in the Arizona Republic and in The Capital Times of Madison, Wisconsin. Our House was published as a book of the same name. In addition, she wrote four other books, published by Horizon Books in the 1950s and 1960s:

1. The Struggle Within (1955)
2. The Shining Brow: Frank Lloyd Wright (1960)
3. The Roots of Life (1963)
4. Frank Lloyd Wright: His Life, His Work, His Words (1966)

=== Books about Olgivanna and the Taliesin Fellowship ===
- The Faraway Music by Svetlana Allilueva (also known as Distant Music.) Edition: 1st. New Delhi: Lancer International, 1984.
- The Fellowship: The Untold Story of Frank Lloyd Wright and the Taliesin Fellowship by Roger Friedland and Harold Zellman, 2006, includes especially extensive and strong documentation on Olgivanna, her relationship with Wright, including "the strong influence the occultist Georgi Gurdjieff had on Wright and especially his wife Olgivanna"
- Frank Lloyd Wright: A Biography by Meryle Secrest, 1992. New York: HarperCollins.
- From Crna Cora to Taliesin Black Mountain to Shining Brow: The Life of Olgivanna Lloyd Wright, by Maxine Fawcett-Yeske and Bruce Brooks Pfeiffer. ODO Editions, 2017. ISBN 978-1939621597
- Reflections from the Shining Brow: My Years with Frank Lloyd Wright and Olgivanna Lazovich, by Kamal Amin. Fithian Press. 2004.
- A Taliesin Legacy: The Architecture of Frank Lloyd Wright's Apprentices (Architecture Series) by Tobias S. Guggenheimer. Wiley, 1995. "[A]n encyclopedia study of the projects planned and/or built by these students, who eagerly embraced Wright's ethic of organic design." (Book Review)
- Taliesin Reflections: My Years Before, During and After Living with Frank Lloyd Wright by Earl Nisbet, 2006. (Book Review)
- Further Teachings of Gurdjieff – Journey Through This World, by C. S. Nott, Routledge & Kegan Paul, includes a chapter Taliesin and the Frank Lloyd Wrights describing a summer spent by Nott at Taliesin, 1969, ISBN 0-7100-6225-7 (cloth), ISBN 0-7100-8938-4 (paper)

== Videography ==
- Frank Lloyd Wright – A film by Ken Burns and Lynn Novick. (1998). PBS Home Video, August 28, 2001 (153 minutes). ASIN B00005MEPO.
- Partner to Genius: A Biography of Olgivanna Lloyd Wright. PBS Home Video, VHS, May 13, 1997. ASIN B00000JKXH.
