= Paul Reynard =

American painter

- Paul Reynard (photo by David Heald, 1987)
- Born: Paul Léon Reynard; October 3, 1927; Lyon, France
- Died: October 28, 2005 (aged 78); Monsey, New York, United States
- Education: École Nationale Supérieure des Beaux-Arts, Atelier Fernand Léger, Atelier Jean Souverbie
- Known for: Painting, drawing, stained glass, posters, murals

Paul Reynard (3 October 1927 – 28 October 2005) was an artist, art teacher, Gurdjieff movements instructor, and co-president of the Gurdjieff Foundation of New York.

== Life and career ==
Reynard was born as Paul Léon Reynard in Lyon, France, the son of Charles Jean Reynard and Alice Anne Claudia Ollier, on 3 October 1927. He received his early training in Lyon under the painter Claude Idoux, with whom he later worked on the famous windows of the Church of Baccarat, Meurthe-et-Moselle, France. He also worked, on his own, on stained-glass windows in churches throughout France and Germany. In 1947, Reynard moved to Paris, where he studied at the École Nationale Supérieure des Beaux-Arts, and in the ateliers of Fernand Léger and Jean Souverbie.

Throughout the early to mid-1960s, Reynard taught drawing at the Écoles d'Art Américaines at Fontainebleau, and at schools in Besançon and Angers. After moving to the United States in 1968, he painted a number of murals throughout the Northeast, including one at 100 Park Avenue in Manhattan, and another at Harvard University. Besides designing and painting murals, several solo shows of his paintings, banners, and drawings were given in New York and at various locales in the United States and Canada. Throughout this period, Reynard also taught drawing at the Parsons School of Design and Pratt Institute, as well as at The School of Visual Arts, where he worked until retiring in 2002.

From 2003 until his death in 2005, Reynard worked closely with the editors of a book about his work in the United States, Paul Reynard: Work in America.

Reynard's first marriage was to the artist Josée Tenas, with whom he had two sons, Antoine and Nicolas. Nicolas, a photographer with National Geographic, died in an airplane crash in 2004. Reynard's second marriage, on 23 December 2004, was to Ellen Dooling, daughter of D. M. Dooling, the founder of Parabola Magazine.

== Exhibitions ==
- 1952-53-54 Salon du Sud-Est, Lyon, France
- 1954 Maison de la Pensée Française, Paris
- 1964 One man show: "Center of Aesthetic Research," Turin, Italy
- 1971 One man show: ABZ Studios, New York, 1971
- 1973 One man show: Brewster Gallery, New York
- 1975 One man show: Brewster Gallery, New York
- 1975 One man show: Wenger-Casat Gallery, San Diego
- 1977 Group show: Brewster Gallery, New York
- 1977 One man show: Brewster Gallery, New York
- 1978 Group show: Balzac Gallery, Los Angeles
- 1978 Group show: Brewster Gallery, New York
- 1979 Group show: Brewster Gallery, New York
- 1980 Group show: Brewster Gallery, New York
- 1981 Group show: Brewster Gallery, New York
- 1982 One man show: Brewster Gallery, New York
- 1984 One man show: Brewster Gallery, New York
- 1990 One man show: Art Banque Gallery, Minneapolis
- 1990 One man show: Pan Medic Center (Drawings), San Francisco
- 1993 One man show: Atélier Circulaire (Drawings), Montreal

== Commissions ==
- 1953-55 Architectural design and graphics of the annual "Salon des Arts ménagers," Paris. Magazines Paris-Match and Elle commissioners.
- 1954-56 Design and execution of the windows (slab glass) of the church, St. Rémy, Baccarat, France. Kazis, architect. In collaboration with the sculptors, Francois Stahly, Étienne Martin
- 1958 Polychromy of the African workmen's city of Sabende, Guinea. Ecochart, architect. Pechiney Chemical Corp., commissioner.
- 1959 Stained glass window commissioned by Dr. Oidtmann, Linnich and bought by the Surmondt Museum, Aachen, West Germany.
- 1961 Stained glass window for the church of Dampart, France. J.J. Lardat, architect.
- 1963-1968 Design of stained glasses in collaboration with Jean Barillet, Maitre verrier, Paris.
- 1972 Mural design for Philip Morris, Inc., 100 Park Avenue, New York. Peter Englert, architect.
- 1973 Architectural design (mural): shopping center. Springfield, Virginia. Zukov, architect.
- 1973 Bottom Line Cabaret, New York. (In collaboration.)
- 1974 Mural design, Texas Agricultural, and Mechanical University.
- 1974 Canaday Hall, Harvard University. Carl Meinhardt, architect.
- 1975 PS 125, City Island, New York. Mural (auditorium)
- 1975 Bottom Line Cabaret, New York.
- 1976 Mural, the office of Ezra D. Ehenkrantz & Associates, Architects, 19 West 44th Street, New York
- 1976 Mural, Synagogue Bais Torah, Suffern, New York. Carl Meinhardt, architect.
- 1978 Architectural design (ceiling), La Galleria building. De Santis, decorator, New York.

== Teaching ==
- Fine Art School, Besançon, France. Drawing. 1963-64
- Fine Art School in Angers, France. Mural Design and Drawing, 1964–68
- American School of Fine Arts of Fontainebleau, France. Painting. 1966-69
- Visiting Instructor at Pratt Institute, New York. Drawing. 1978-80
- The School of Visual Arts, New York. Drawing. 1981-2002

== Lectures and Workshops ==
- Lecture: "The Play of Creation.” San Francisco State College (U.C.S.F.), 1972
- Lectures and Workshops, University of California, Berkeley extension, San Francisco:
  - "The Forces of Creation,” 1978
  - "Geometry of Creation,” 1979
  - "Art and Time,” 1980
  - "Art and the Crisis of the Modern World,” 1981
  - "Art and the Myth of Education,” 1982
- Lecture: "Art and Communication.” The Center for Peace through Culture, New York, 1983
- Lecture-workshop: "The Dream of Life, The Reality of Art.” Community Congregational Church, Tiburon, California, 1983
- Lecture-workshop: "Life as Self Expression.” Balboa Seminars, San Francisco., 1986
- Lecture: "The Lost Tradition of Apprenticeship in Art and Life.” School of Sacred Arts, New York, 1988
- Lecture-workshops, Balboa Seminars, San Francisco:
  - "The Language of the Heart,” 1988
  - "The Work of the Mind,” 1991
  - "To Create is to Attend,” 1992
  - "Responsibility, Community, and the Individual,” 1993
