= Hykes =

Hykes is a surname. Notable people with the surname include:

- David Hykes (born 1953), American musician
- Julian Hykes (born 1982), South African field hockey player
