= Jeanne de Salzmann =

French-Swiss dance teacher and mystic (1889–1990)

Jeanne de Salzmann (born Jeanne-Marie Allemand) often addressed as Madame de Salzmann (January 26, 1889, Reims – May 24, 1990, Paris) was a French-Swiss dance teacher and a close pupil of the spiritual teacher G. I. Gurdjieff.

== Life ==
Jeanne de Salzmann was born Jeanne-Marie Allemand, the daughter of the famous Swiss architect Jules Louis Allemand and of Marie Louise Matignon.

Madame de Salzmann began her career at the Conservatory of Geneva, studying piano. Later a student of Émile Jaques-Dalcroze in Germany from 1912, she taught dance and rhythmic movements. She met her husband Alexandre de Salzmann in Hellerau at Dalcroze's Institute. They married on September 6 in Geneva. With him she had a daughter, Nathalie de Salzmann (1919-2007). The First World War caused the closure of Dalcroze's Institute and Jeanne and her husband Alexandre moved to Tiflis, Georgia where she continued to teach.

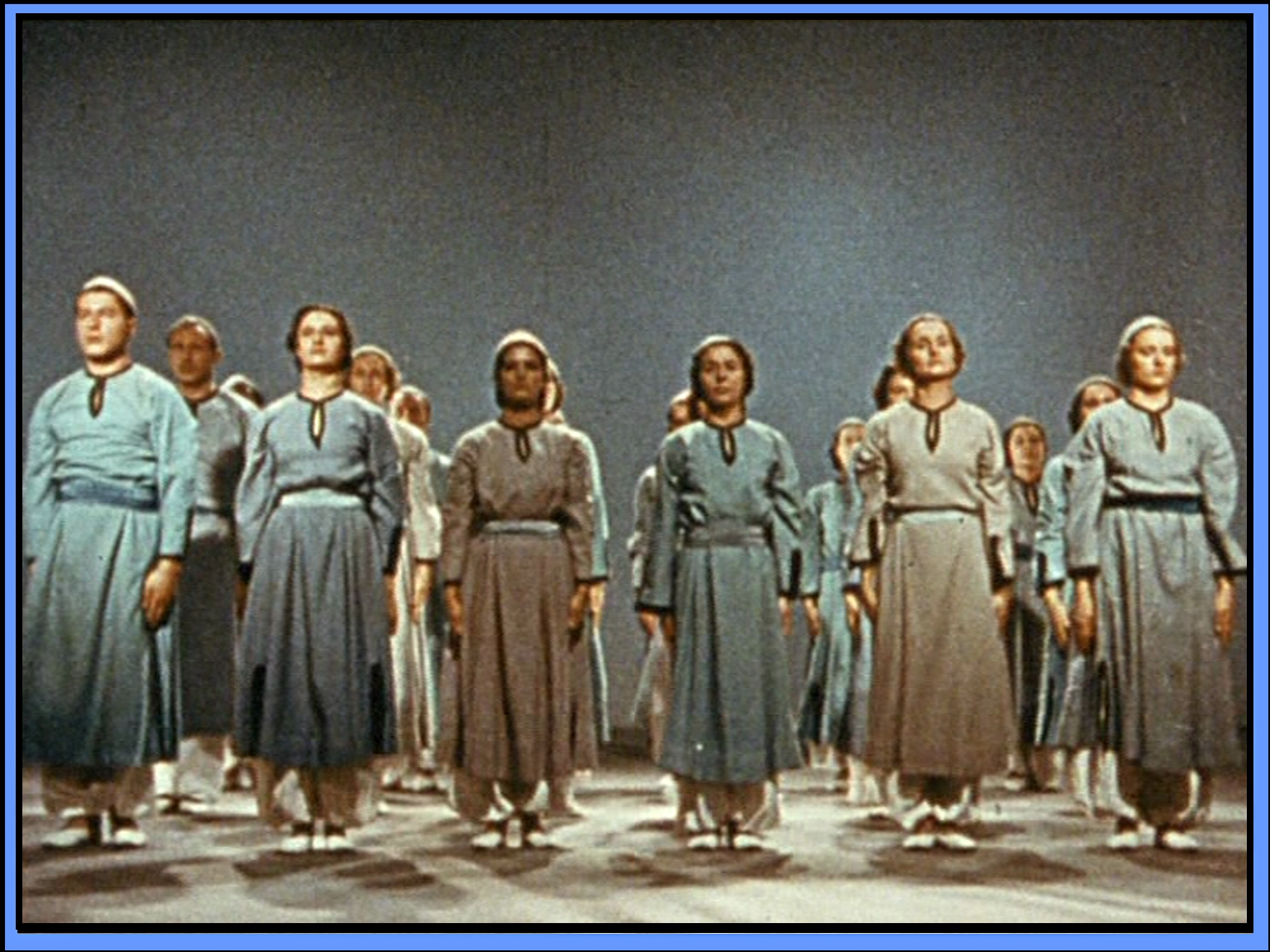
Gurdjieff movements

In 1919, Thomas de Hartmann introduced the de Salzmanns to George Gurdjieff, a relationship that would last until Gurdjieff's death in 1949. She worked with Gurdjieff for nearly 30 years. De Salzmann was recognized as his deputy by many of Gurdjieff's other pupils. She was responsible for transmitting the movements and his teaching through the Gurdjieff Institute of Paris, the Gurdjieff Foundation of New York City, the Gurdjieff Society in London and the Fundación Gurdjieff of Caracas, which she founded or helped founding, as well as other formal and informal groups throughout the world.

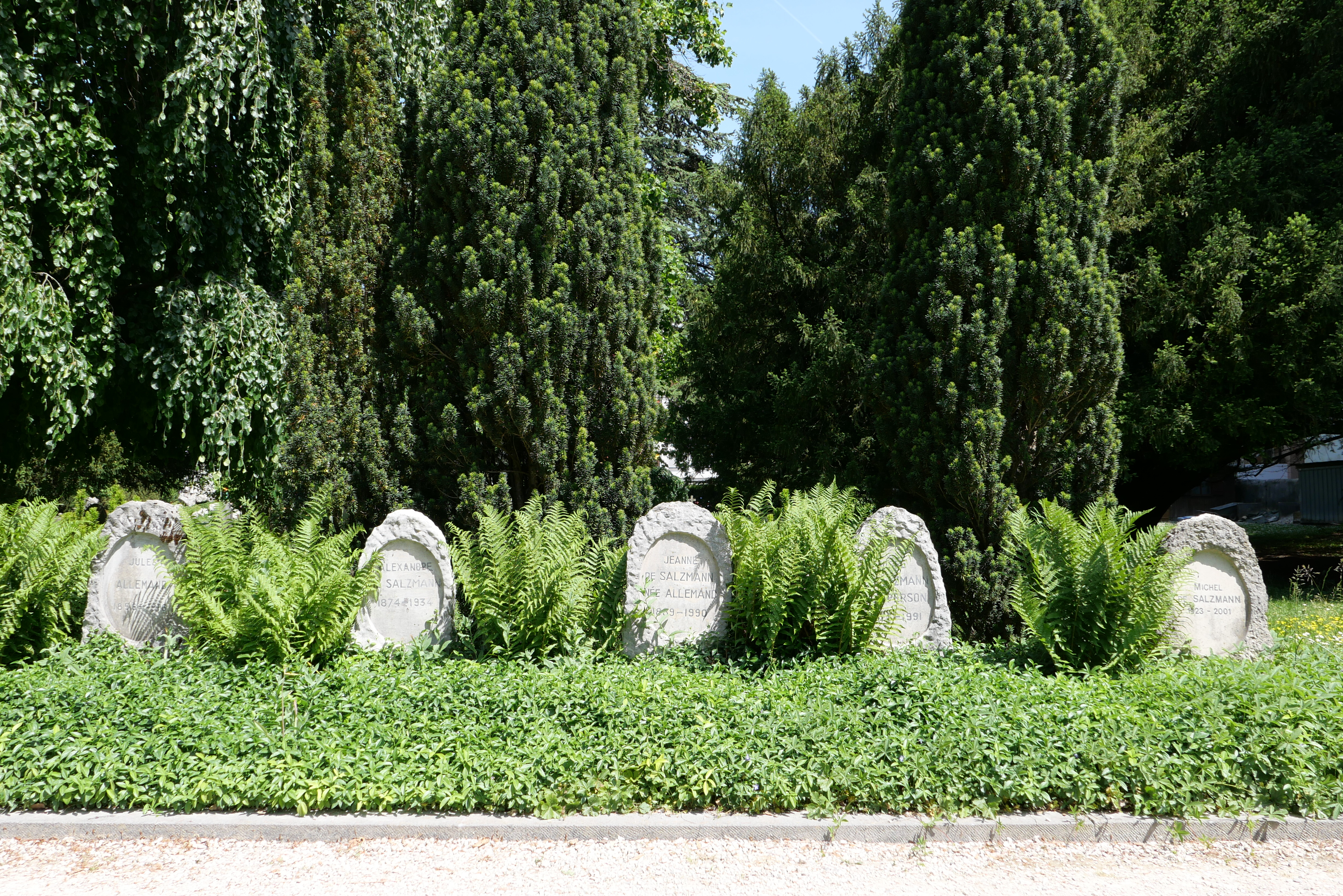
De Salzmann's tomb (centre) in the family grave

She led the Gurdjieff Institute of Paris and continued Gurdjieff's teachings, emphasizing work with the movements, until she died, 101 years old, in 1990.

Jeanne de Salzmann played a major role in realizing the 1979 movie Meetings with Remarkable Men by Peter Brook.

She was buried at Cimetière des Rois in the Plainpalais district of Geneva.

After her death, her son Michel de Salzmann (1923–2001) took over the leadership of the organization and a book, The Reality of Being, was made, based on the notebooks she kept for 40 years, witnessing her work and teaching after Gurdjieff died
