= George Gurdjieff =

Russian Empire mystic and writer (c. 1866–1877 – 1949)

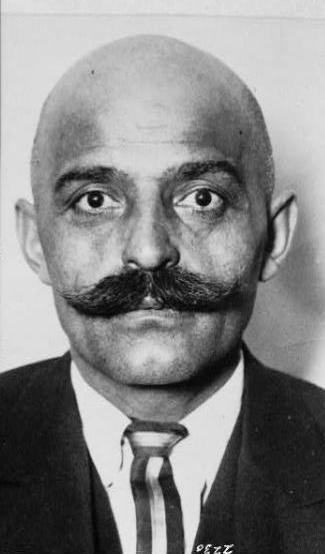
- Gurdjieff between 1925 and 1935
- Born: George Ivanovich Gurdjieff c. 1866–1877; Alexandropol, Yerevan Governorate, Russian Empire
- Died: 29 October 1949 (aged 71–83); Neuilly-sur-Seine, France
- Citizenship: Russian Empire (c. 1867 – May 1918); First Republic of Armenia (May 1918 – December 1920); Stateless (1921–1949)

Philosophical work
- School: Fourth Way
- Notable students: P. D. Ouspensky; Thomas de Hartmann; Olga de Hartmann; Jane Heap; John G. Bennett; Maurice Nicoll; Olgivanna Lloyd Wright
- Main interests: Perennial philosophy; Psychology; Spirituality
- Notable ideas: Fourth Way; enneagram; centers

George Ivanovich Gurdjieff (c. 1866–1877 – 29 October 1949) was a philosopher, mystic, spiritual teacher, composer, and movements teacher. (Note: Pittman 2008: During the early period after Gurdjieff's arrival in Europe in 1921 he gained significant notoriety in Europe and the United States... In October 1922, Gurdjieff set up a school at the Prieuré des Basses Loges at Fontainebleau-Avon, outside of Paris. It was at the Prieuré that Gurdjieff met many notable figures, authors, and artists of the early twentieth century, many of whom went on to be close students and exponents of his teaching. Over the course of his life, those who visited and worked with him included the French author René Daumal; the renowned short story author from New Zealand, Katherine Mansfield; Kathryn Hulme, later the author of A Nun's Life; P. L. Travers, the author of Mary Poppins; and Jean Toomer, the author of Cane, whose work and influence would figure prominently in the Harlem Renaissance... Numerous study groups, organizations, formal foundations, and even land-based communities have been initiated in his name, primarily in North and South America and Europe, and to a lesser extent, in Japan, China, India, Australia, and South Africa. In 1979, Peter Brook, the British theater director and author, created a film based on Meetings with Remarkable Men.)

Gurdjieff taught that people are not conscious of themselves and thus live their lives in a state of hypnotic "waking sleep", but that it is possible to awaken to a higher state of consciousness to "remember ourselves" and serve our purpose as human beings. The aim of his teaching is that people should become aware of the meaning of their presence on earth and of their place in the scale of being. His student P. D. Ouspensky referred to Gurdjieff's teachings as the "Fourth Way".

Gurdjieff's teaching has inspired the formation of many groups around the world. After his death in 1949, the Gurdjieff Foundation in Paris was established and led by his close pupil Jeanne de Salzmann in cooperation with other direct pupils of Gurdjieff, until her death in 1990; and then by her son Michel de Salzmann, until his death in 2001.

The International Association of the Gurdjieff Foundations comprises the Institut Gurdjieff in France; The Gurdjieff Foundation in the USA; The Gurdjieff Society in the UK; and the Gurdjieff Foundation in Venezuela.

== Early life ==
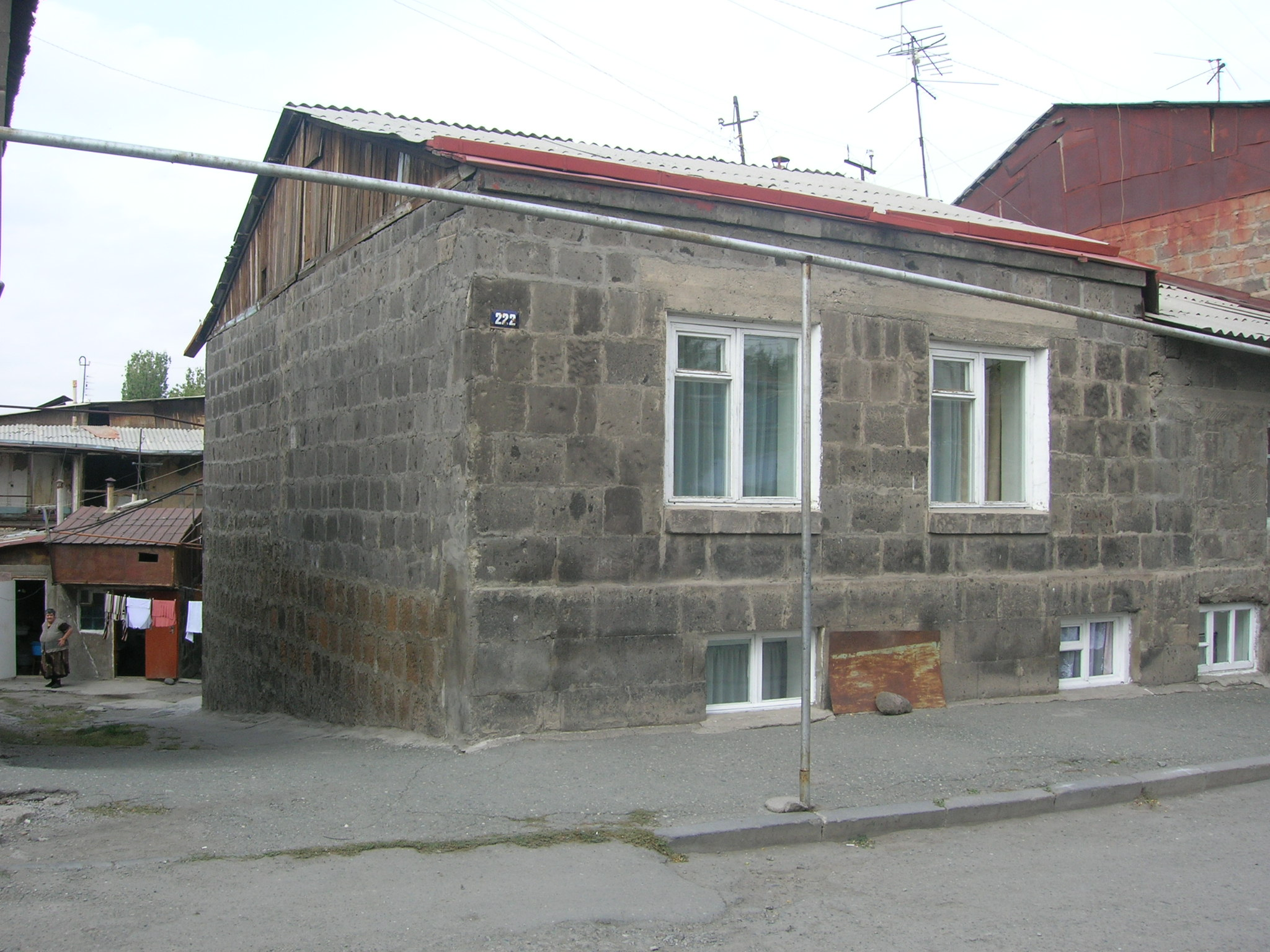
The house in which Gurdjieff was allegedly born

Gurdjieff was born in Alexandropol, Yerevan Governorate, Russian Empire (now Gyumri, Armenia). His father Ivan Ivanovich Gurdjieff (born Ioannis Georgiades) was a Greek and a renowned ashugh under the pseudonym of Adash, who in the 1870s managed large herds of cattle and sheep. The name Gurdjieff represents the Anglicized Russian form of the Greek surname Γεωργιάδης (Georgiádes). According to Gurdjieff himself, his father came from a Greek family whose ancestors had emigrated from Byzantium after the fall of Constantinople in 1453, with his family initially moving to central Anatolia, and from there eventually to Georgia in the Caucasus. The long-held view is that his mother was Armenian, although some scholars, on the basis of recent research, have proposed that she too was Greek. (Note: Publications supporting Greek maternal ancestry: Benham 2025, pp. 7, 10–12: "Khomeriki says Gurdjieff's mother, Eudoxie Kalerof had a Greek father, Elepther Eleptheroff (Elepheriadis) and a Greek mother, Sophie [...] When P.D. Ouspensky visited Alexandropol in 1917 he observed "I met his family, his father, and his mother...They were Greeks" [...] Gurdjieff never called himself Greek-Armenian. On shipping passenger records he listed his ethnicity (race) as either Russian or Greek and always listed his nationality as Russian (section 7)."; Taylor 2020, p. 14: "If it seems odd that an Armenian woman would carry a Greek name, it is apparent that that Gurdjieff's mother was Greek as well as his father, confirming Gurdjieff's frequent assertion that his mother tongue was Greek. Gurdjieff's German papers, which he carried during the Second World War, identified him as Greek."; Churton 2017, pp. 19–25: "Archival Records: ... One thing we can be reasonably certain of is that both Gurdjieff's parents were Greek. ... It is quite possible that Ivan met the Greek Evdokia in Alexandropol's substantial Greek quarter, known as Urmonts, ..."; Lipsey 2019, pp. 11, 316: "In his major book, Beelzebub's Tales to His Grandson (which developed across multiple languages from the mid-1920s through to its English-language publication in 1950), Gurdjieff was ferociously satirical where ancient Greek culture was concerned—though he was born to Greek parents and spoke Greek from his earliest days (as well as Armenian, and soon Russian and Turkish).^{15} ... 15. It will come as a surprise to readers familiar with the Gurdjieff legacy that both of his parents were Greek; the assumption has long been that his mother Evdokia was Armenian."; Pittman 2012, p. 223: "Though the long-held view is that Gurdjieff's mother was Armenian, Paul Taylor, on the basis of recent research, offers that Gurdjieff's mother's father was Greek (Taylor 2008)."; Publications supporting Armenian maternal ancestry: Bennet 1984, p. 30: "The first thing to remember about Gurdjieff is that he was born of a Greek father and an Armenian mother."; de Hartmann & de Hartmann 1964, p. xv "Georgi Ivanovich Gurdjieff was born of a Greek father and an Armenian mother."; Moore 1999, p. 84: "... but on the human level he cared passionately that his Armenian mother and sisters in Alexandropol remain safely on the Russian side."; Needleman & Baker 1997, p. 431: "He was born, probably in 1866, of a Greek father and an Armenian mother in Alexandropol (Leninakan), Armenia, a region where Eastern and Western cultures mixed and often clashed."; Webb 1987: "Gurdjieff was the son of a Greek father and an Armenian mother. Although he spoke both Greek and Armenian, the latter was the language of the Gurdjieff household."; Lang 1988, p. 166: "Unquestionably, Gurdjieff is among the most intriguing men Armenia has ever produced. Yet the Armenians have been slow to claim him as one of their own, and his name appears in few reference books connected with Armenia."; Pittman 2008, p. x: "Gurdjieff was born in Gyumri, Armenia, to an Armenian mother and a Cappadocian-Greek father."; Tchekhovitch 2006, pp. 244–240: "Since for some time I had the privilege of living close to Mr. Gurdjieff's mother, I am sure the reader will understand why I would wish to devote to this woman some recollections that illustrate her exceptional character ... Her last words, spoken in Armenian, had the character of a Japanese poem.")

There are conflicting views regarding Gurdjieff's birth date, ranging from 1866 to 1877. The bulk of extant records weigh heavily toward 1877, but Gurdjieff in reported conversations with students gave the year of his birth as c. 1867, which is corroborated by the account of his niece Luba Gurdjieff Everitt. George Kiourtzidis, great-grandson of Gurdjieff's paternal uncle Vasilii (through Vasilii's son Alexander), recalled that his grandfather Alexander, born in 1875, said that Gurdjieff was about three years older than him, which would point to a birth date c. 1872; this is the same date inscribed in a plate on the grave-marker in the cemetery of Avon, Seine-et-Marne, France, where his body was buried. Although official documents consistently record the day of his birth as 28 December, Gurdjieff himself celebrated his birthday either on the Old Orthodox Julian calendar date of 1 January, or according to the Gregorian calendar date for New Year of 13 January (up to 1899; 14 January after 1900).

Gurdjieff spent his childhood in Kars, which, from 1878 to 1918, was the administrative capital of the Russian-ruled Transcaucasus province of Kars Oblast, a border region recently acquired following the defeat of the Ottoman Empire. It contained extensive grassy plateau-steppe and high mountains, and was inhabited by a multi-ethnic and multi-confessional population that had a history of respect for travelling mystics and holy men, and for religious syncretism and conversion. Both the city of Kars and the surrounding territory were home to an extremely diverse population: although part of the Armenian Plateau, the Russian-ruled Transcaucasus province of Kars Oblast was home to Armenians, Caucasus Greeks, Pontic Greeks, Georgians, Russians, Kurds, Turks, and smaller numbers of Christian communities from eastern and central Europe such as Caucasus Germans, Estonians, and Russian Orthodox sectarian communities like the Molokans, Doukhobors, Pryguny, and Subbotniks.

Gurdjieff makes particular mention of the Yazidi community. Growing up in a multi-ethnic society, Gurdjieff became fluent in Armenian, Pontic Greek, Russian, and Turkish, speaking the last in a mixture of elegant Ottoman Turkish with some dialect. He later acquired "a working facility with several European languages".

Early influences on him included his father, a carpenter and amateur ashik or bardic poet, and the priest of the town's cathedral, Dean Borsh, a family friend. The young Gurdjieff avidly read literature from many sources and influenced by these writings and witnessing a number of phenomena that he could not explain, he formed the conviction that there existed a hidden truth known to mankind in the past, which could not be ascertained from science or mainstream religion.

=== Travels ===
In early adulthood, according to his own account, Gurdjieff's search for such knowledge led him to travel widely to Central Asia, Egypt, Iran, India, Tibet and other places before he returned to Russia for a few years in 1912. He was never forthcoming about the source of his teaching, which he once labelled as esoteric Christianity, in that it ascribes a psychological rather than a literal meaning to various parables and statements found in the Bible. The only account of his wanderings appears in his book Meetings with Remarkable Men, which is not generally considered to be a reliable autobiography. One example is of the adventure of walking across the Gobi desert on stilts, where Gurdjieff said he was able to look down on the contours of the sand dunes while the sand storm whirled around below him. Each chapter is named after a "remarkable man", some of whom were putative members of a society called "The Seekers of Truth".

After Gurdjieff's death, J. G. Bennett researched his potential sources and suggested that the men were symbolic of the three types of people to whom Gurdjieff referred: No. 1 centred in their physical body; No. 2 centred in their emotions and No. 3 centred in their mind. Gurdjieff describes how he encountered dervishes, fakirs and descendants of the Essenes, whose teaching he said had been conserved at a monastery in Sarmoung. The book also has an overarching quest involving a map of "pre-sand Egypt" and culminates in an encounter with the "Sarmoung Brotherhood".

Gurdjieff wrote that he supported himself during his travels by engaging in various enterprises such as running a travelling repair shop and making paper flowers; and on one occasion while thinking about what he could do, he described catching sparrows in the park and then dyeing them yellow to be sold as canaries; It is also speculated by commentators that during his travels he was engaged in a certain amount of political activity, as part of The Great Game.

== Career ==
From 1913 to 1949, the chronology appears to be based on material that can be confirmed by primary documents, independent witnesses, cross-references and reasonable inference. On New Year's Day in 1912, Gurdjieff arrived in Moscow and attracted his first students, including his cousin, the sculptor Sergey Merkurov, and the eccentric Rachmilievitch. In the same year, he married Julia Ostrowska, a Pole, in Saint Petersburg. In 1914, Gurdjieff advertised his ballet, The Struggle of the Magicians, and he supervised his pupils' writing of the sketch Glimpses of Truth.

=== Gurdjieff and Ouspensky ===
In 1915, Gurdjieff accepted P. D. Ouspensky as a pupil, and in 1916, he accepted the composer Thomas de Hartmann and his wife, Olga, as students. He then had about 30 pupils. Ouspensky already had a reputation as a writer on mystical subjects and had conducted his own, ultimately disappointing, search for wisdom in the East. The Fourth Way "system" taught during this period was complex and metaphysical, partly expressed in scientific terminology.

During the revolutionary upheaval in Russia, Gurdjieff left Petrograd in 1917 to return to his family home in Alexandropol (present-day Gyumri in Armenia). During the October Revolution, he set up a temporary study community in Essentuki in the Caucasus, where he worked intensively with a small group of Russian pupils. Gurdjieff's eldest sister Anna and her family later arrived there as refugees, informing him that Turks had shot his father in Alexandropol on 15 May. As the area became increasingly threatened by civil war, Gurdjieff fabricated a newspaper story announcing his forthcoming "scientific expedition" to "Mount Induc". Posing as a scientist and wearing a red fireman's belt with brass rings Gurdjieff left Essentuki with fourteen companions (excluding Gurdjieff's family and Ouspensky). They travelled by train to Maikop, where hostilities delayed them for three weeks. In the spring of 1919, Gurdjieff met the artist Alexandre de Salzmann and his wife Jeanne and accepted them as pupils. Assisted by Jeanne de Salzmann, Gurdjieff gave the first public demonstration of his Sacred Dances (Movements at the Tbilisi Opera House, 22 June).

In March 1918, Ouspensky separated from Gurdjieff, settling in England and teaching the Fourth Way in his own right. The two men were to have a very ambivalent relationship for decades to come.

=== Georgia and Turkey ===
In 1919, Gurdjieff and his closest pupils moved to Tbilisi, Georgia, where Gurdjieff's wife Julia Ostrowska, the Stjoernvals, the Hartmanns, and the de Salzmanns continued to assimilate his teaching. Gurdjieff concentrated on his still unstaged ballet, The Struggle of the Magicians. Thomas de Hartmann (who had made his debut years ago, before Tsar Nicholas II of Russia), worked on the music for the ballet, and Olga Ivanovna Hinzenberg (who years later wed the American architect Frank Lloyd Wright), practiced the dances. It was here that Gurdjieff opened his first Institute for the Harmonious Development of Man.

In late May 1920, when political and social conditions in Georgia deteriorated, his party travelled to Batumi on the Black Sea coast and then by ship to Constantinople (today Istanbul). Gurdjieff rented an apartment on Kumbaracı Street in Péra and later at 13 Abdullatif Yemeneci Sokak near the Galata Tower. The apartment is near the Khanqah (Sufi lodge) of the Mevlevi Order (a Sufi order following the teachings of Jalal al-Din Muhammad Rumi), where Gurdjieff, Ouspensky and Thomas de Hartmann witnessed the Sama ceremony of the Whirling Dervishes. In Istanbul, Gurdjieff also met his future pupil, Capt. John G. Bennett, then head of the British Directorate of Military Intelligence in Ottoman Turkey, who described his impression of Gurdjieff as follows:

It was there that I first met Gurdjieff in the autumn of 1920, and no surroundings could have been more appropriate. In Gurdjieff, East and West do not just meet. Their difference is annihilated in a world outlook which knows no distinctions of race or creed. This was my first, and has remained one of my strongest impressions. A Greek from the Caucasus, he spoke Turkish with an accent of unexpected purity, the accent that one associates with those born and bred in the narrow circle of the Imperial Court. His appearance was striking enough even in Turkey, where one saw many unusual types. His head was shaven, immense black moustache, eyes which at one moment seemed very pale and at another almost black. Below average height, he gave nevertheless an impression of great physical strength.

=== Prieuré at Avon ===
In August 1921 and 1922, Gurdjieff travelled around western Europe, lecturing and giving demonstrations of his work in various cities, such as Berlin and London. He attracted the allegiance of Ouspensky's many prominent pupils (notably the editor A. R. Orage). After an unsuccessful attempt to gain British citizenship, Gurdjieff established the Institute for the Harmonious Development of Man south of Paris at the Prieuré des Basses Loges in Avon near the famous Château de Fontainebleau. The once-impressive but somewhat crumbling mansion set in extensive grounds housed an entourage of several dozen, including some of Gurdjieff's remaining relatives and some White Russian refugees. Gurdjieff is quoted by his students in Views from the Real World as saying: "The Institute can help one to be able to be a Christian." An aphorism was displayed which stated: "Here there are neither Russians nor English, Jews nor Christians, but only those who pursue one aim – to be able to be."

New pupils included C. S. Nott, René Zuber, Margaret Anderson and her ward Fritz Peters. The intellectual and middle-class types who were attracted to Gurdjieff's teaching often found the Prieuré's spartan accommodation and emphasis on hard labour on the grounds disconcerting. Gurdjieff was putting into practice his teaching that people need to develop physically, emotionally and intellectually, so lectures, music, dance, and manual work were organised. Older pupils noticed how the Prieuré teaching differed from the complex metaphysical "system" that had been taught in Russia. In addition to the physical hardships, his personal behaviour towards pupils could be ferocious:

Gurdjieff was standing by his bed in a state of what seemed to me to be completely uncontrolled fury. He was raging at Orage, who stood impassively and very pale, framed in one of the windows... Suddenly, in the space of an instant, Gurdjieff's voice stopped, his whole personality changed and he gave me a broad smile—and looking incredibly peaceful and inwardly quiet, motioned me to leave. He then resumed his tirade with undiminished force. This happened so quickly that I do not believe that Mr. Orage even noticed the break in the rhythm.

During this period, Gurdjieff acquired notoriety as "the man who killed Katherine Mansfield" after Katherine Mansfield died there of tuberculosis on 9 January 1923. However, James Moore and Ouspensky argue that Mansfield knew she would soon die and that Gurdjieff made her last days happy and fulfilling.

=== First car accident, writing and visits to North America ===
Starting in 1924, Gurdjieff made visits to North America, where he eventually received the pupils taught previously by A. R. Orage. In 1924, while driving alone from Paris to Fontainebleau, he had a near-fatal car crash. Nursed by his wife and mother, he made a slow and painful recovery against all medical expectations. Still convalescent, he formally "disbanded" his institute on 26 August (in fact he dispersed only his "less dedicated" pupils) which he expressed was a personal undertaking: "in the future, under the pretext of different worthy reasons, to remove from my eyesight all those who by this or that make my life too comfortable".

While recovering from his injuries and still too weak to write himself, he began to dictate his magnum opus, Beelzebub's Tales, the first part of All and Everything, in a mixture of Armenian and Russian. The book is generally found to be convoluted and obscure and forces the reader to "work" to find its meaning. He continued to develop the book over some years, writing in noisy cafes which he found conducive for setting down his thoughts.

Gurdjieff's mother died in 1925 and his wife developed cancer and died in June 1926. Ouspensky attended her funeral. According to the writer Fritz Peters, Gurdjieff was in New York from November 1925 to the spring of 1926, when he succeeded in raising over $100,000. He was to make six or seven trips to the US, but alienated a number of people with his brash and impudent demands for money.

A Chicago-based Gurdjieff group was founded by Jean Toomer in 1927 after he had trained at the Prieuré for a year. Diana Huebert was a regular member of the Chicago group, and documented the several visits Gurdjieff made to the group in 1932 and 1934 in her memoirs on the man.

Despite his fund-raising efforts in America, the Prieuré operation ran into debt and was shut down in 1932. Gurdjieff constituted a new teaching group in Paris. Known as The Rope, it was composed of only women, many of them writers, and several lesbians. Members included Kathryn Hulme, Jane Heap, Margaret Anderson and Enrico Caruso's widow, Dorothy. Gurdjieff became acquainted with Gertrude Stein through its members, but she was never a follower.

In 1935, Gurdjieff stopped work on All and Everything. He had completed the first two parts of the planned trilogy but then started on the Third Series. (It was later published under the title Life Is Real Only Then, When 'I Am'.) In 1936, he settled in a flat at 6, Rue des Colonels-Renard in Paris, where he was to stay for the rest of his life. In 1937, his brother Dmitry died, and The Rope disbanded.

== World War II ==
Although the flat at 6 Rue des Colonels-Renard was very small, he continued to teach groups of pupils there throughout the war. Visitors have described his pantry or 'inner sanctum' as being stocked with an extraordinary collection of eastern delicacies. The suppers he held included elaborate toasts to 'idiots', drunk with vodka and cognac. Having cut a physically impressive figure for many years, he was now paunchy. His teaching was now conveyed more directly through personal interaction with his pupils, who were encouraged to study the ideas he had expressed in Beelzebub's Tales.

His personal business enterprises (including intermittently dealing in oriental rugs and carpets for much of his life, among other activities) enabled him to offer charitable relief to neighbours who had been affected by the difficult circumstances of the war, and it also brought him to the attention of the authorities, leading to a night in the cells.

== Final years ==
After the war, Gurdjieff tried to reconnect with his former pupils. Ouspensky was hesitant, but after his death (October 1947), his widow advised his remaining pupils to see Gurdjieff in Paris. J. G. Bennett also visited from England, their first meeting in 25 years. Ouspensky's pupils in England had all thought that Gurdjieff was dead. They discovered he was alive only after the death of Ouspensky, who had not told them that Gurdjieff, from whom he had learnt of the teaching, was still living. They were overjoyed and many of Ouspensky's pupils including Rina Hands, Basil Tilley and Catherine Murphy visited Gurdjieff in Paris. Hands and Murphy worked on the typing and retyping for the publication of All and Everything.

Gurdjieff suffered a second car accident in 1948 but again made an unexpected recovery.

"I was looking at a dying man. Even this is not enough to express it. It was a dead man, a corpse, that came out of the car; and yet it walked. I was shivering like someone who sees a ghost." With iron-like tenacity, he managed to get to his room, where he sat down and said: "Now all organs are destroyed. Must make new". Then, he turned to Bennett, smiling: "Tonight you come dinner. I must make body work". As he spoke, a great spasm of pain shook his body and blood gushed from an ear. Bennett thought: "He has a cerebral haemorrhage. He will kill himself if he continues to force his body to move". But then he reflected: "He has to do all this. If he allows his body to stop moving, he will die. He has power over his body".

After recovering, Gurdjieff finalised plans for the official publication of Beelzebub's Tales and made two trips to New York. He also visited the famous prehistoric cave paintings at Lascaux, giving his interpretation of their significance to his pupils.

== Death ==
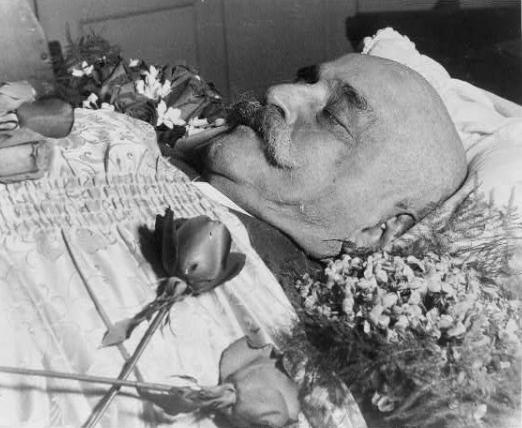
The body of Gurdjieff, lying in state, France. "Every one of those unfortunates during the process of existence should constantly sense and be cognizant of the inevitability of his own death as well as of the death of everyone upon whom his eyes or attention rests".

Gurdjieff died of cancer at the American Hospital in Neuilly-sur-Seine, France, on 29 October 1949. His funeral took place at the St. Alexandre Nevsky Russian Orthodox Cathedral at 12 Rue Daru, Paris. He is buried in the cemetery at Avon (near Fontainebleau). According to Madame de Salzmann, his last words to her were: "Do everything, even the impossible, to develop what I have brought."

== Personal life ==
=== Children ===
Although no evidence or documents have certified anyone as a child of Gurdjieff, the following six people have been claimed to be his children:

- Nikolai Stjernvall (1919–2010), whose mother was Elizaveta Grigorievna, wife of Leonid Robertovich de Stjernvall.
- Michel de Salzmann (1923–2001), whose mother was Jeanne Allemand de Salzmann; he later became head of the Gurdjieff Foundation.
- Cynthie Sophia "Dushka" Howarth (1924–2010); her mother was dancer Jessmin Howarth. She went on to found the Gurdjieff Heritage Society.
- Eve Taylor (born 1928), whose mother was one of his followers, American socialite Edith Annesley Taylor.
- Sergei Chaverdian; his mother was Lily Galumnian Chaverdian.
- Andrei, born to a mother known only as Georgii.

Gurdjieff had a niece, Luba Gurdjieff Everitt, who for about 40 years (1950s–1990s) ran a small but rather famous restaurant, Luba's Bistro, in Knightsbridge, London.

== Ideas ==
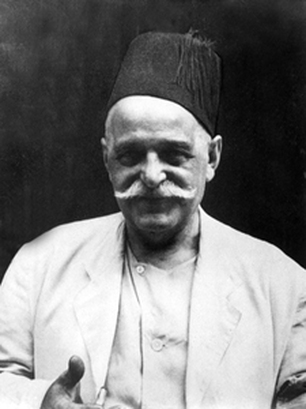
George Gurdjieff

Gurdjieff taught that people cannot perceive reality as they are, because they are not conscious of themselves, but rather live in a state of hypnotic "waking sleep" of constantly turning thoughts, worries and imagination. The title of one of his books is Life is Real, Only Then, when "I am".

"Man lives his life in sleep, and in sleep he dies." As a result, a person perceives the world while in a state of dream. He asserted that people in their ordinary waking state function as unconscious automatons, but that a person can "wake up" and become what a human being ought to be.

Some contemporary researchers claim that Gurdjieff's concept of self-remembering is "close to the Buddhist concept of awareness or a popular definition of 'mindfulness'. ... The Buddhist term translated into English as 'mindfulness' originates in the Pali term 'sati', which is identical to Sanskrit 'smṛti'. Both terms mean 'to remember'." As Gurdjieff himself said at a meeting held in his Paris flat during the Second World War: "Our aim is to have constantly a sensation of oneself, of one's individuality: this sensation cannot be expressed intellectually, because it is organic. It is something which makes you independent, when you are with other people."

=== Self-development teachings ===
Gurdjieff argued that many of the existing forms of religious and spiritual tradition on Earth had lost connection with their original meaning and vitality and so could no longer serve humanity in the way that had been intended at their inception. As a result, humans were failing to realize the truths of ancient teachings and were instead becoming more and more like automatons, susceptible to control from outside and increasingly capable of otherwise unthinkable acts of mass psychosis such as World War I. At best, the various surviving sects and schools could provide only a one-sided development, which did not result in a fully integrated human being.

According to Gurdjieff, only one of the three dimensions of a person—namely, either the emotions, or the physical body or the mind—tends to develop in such schools and sects, and generally at the expense of the other faculties or centres, as Gurdjieff called them. As a result, these ways fail to produce a properly balanced human being. Furthermore, anyone wishing to undertake any of the traditional paths to spiritual knowledge (which Gurdjieff reduced to three—namely the way of the Fakir, the way of the Monk, and the way of the Yogi) were required to renounce life in the world. But Gurdjieff also described a "Fourth Way" which would be amenable to the requirements of contemporary people living in Europe and America. Instead of training the mind, body and emotions separately, Gurdjieff's discipline worked on all three to promote an organic connection between them and a balanced development.

In parallel with other spiritual traditions, Gurdjieff taught that a person must expend considerable effort to effect the transformation that leads to awakening. Gurdjieff referred to it as "The Work" or "Work on oneself". According to Gurdjieff, "Working on oneself is not so difficult as wishing to work, taking the decision." Though Gurdjieff never put major significance on the term "Fourth Way" and never used the term in his writings, his pupil P. D. Ouspensky from 1924 to 1947 made the term and its use central to his own interpretation of Gurdjieff's teaching. After Ouspensky's death, his students published a book titled The Fourth Way based on his lectures.

Gurdjieff's teaching addressed the question of humanity's place in the universe and the importance of developing its latent potentialities—regarded as our natural endowment as human beings, but which was rarely brought to fruition. He taught that higher levels of consciousness, higher bodies, inner growth and development are real possibilities that nonetheless require conscious work to achieve. The aim was not to acquire anything new but to recover what we had lost.

In his teaching, Gurdjieff gave a distinct meaning to various ancient texts such as the Bible and many religious prayers. He believed that such texts possess meanings very different from those commonly attributed to them. "Sleep not"; "Awake, for you know not the hour"; and "The Kingdom of Heaven is Within" are examples of biblical statements which point to teachings whose essence has been forgotten.

Gurdjieff taught people how to strengthen and focus their attention and energy in various ways so as to minimize daydreaming and absentmindedness. According to his teaching, this inner development of oneself is the beginning of a possible further process of change, the aim of which is to transform people into what Gurdjieff believed they ought to be.

Distrusting "morality", which he describes as varying from culture to culture, often contradictory and hypocritical, Gurdjieff greatly stressed the importance of "conscience".

To provide conditions in which inner attention could be exercised more intensively, Gurdjieff also taught his pupils "sacred dances" or "movements", later known as the Gurdjieff movements, which they performed together as a group. He also left a body of music, inspired by what he heard in visits to remote monasteries and other places, written for piano in collaboration with one of his pupils, Thomas de Hartmann.

Gurdjieff used various exercises, such as the "Stop" exercise, to prompt self-observation in his students. Other shocks to help awaken his pupils from constant daydreaming were always possible at any moment.

=== Methods ===
The practices associated with Gurdjieff's teachings are not an intellectual pursuit and neither are they new concepts, but are rather practical ways of living "in the moment" so as to allow consciousness of oneself ("self-remembering") to appear. Gurdjieff used a number of methods and materials to wake up his followers, which apart from his own living presence, included meetings, music, movements (sacred dance), writings, lectures, and innovative forms of group and individual work. The purpose of these various methods was to 'put a spanner in the works', so as to permit a connection to be made between mind and body, which is easily talked about, but which has to be experienced to understand what it means. Since each individual is different, Gurdjieff did not have a one-size-fits-all approach and employed different means to impart what he himself had discovered. In Russia, he was described as keeping his teaching confined to a small circle, whereas in Paris and North America, he gave numerous public demonstrations.

Gurdjieff felt that the traditional methods to acquire self-knowledge—those of the Fakir, Monk, and Yogi (acquired, respectively, through pain, devotion, and study)—were inadequate on their own to achieve any real understanding. He instead advocated "the way of the sly man" as a shortcut to encouraging inner development that might otherwise take years of effort and without any real outcome.

==== Music ====
Gurdjieff's music is divided into three distinct periods. The "first period" is the early music, including music from the ballet Struggle of the Magicians and music for early movements dating to the years around 1918.

The "second period" music, for which Gurdjieff arguably became best known, written in collaboration with Russian-born composer Thomas de Hartmann, is described as the Gurdjieff-de-Hartmann music. Dating to the mid-1920s, it offers a rich repertoire with roots in Caucasian and Central Asian folk and religious music, Russian Orthodox liturgical music, and other sources. This music was often first heard in the salon at the Prieuré, where much was composed. Since the publication of four volumes of this piano repertoire by Schott, recently completed, there has been a wealth of new recordings, including orchestral versions of music prepared by Gurdjieff and de Hartmann for the Movements demonstrations of 1923–1924. Solo piano versions of these works have been recorded by Cecil Lytle, Keith Jarrett, and Frederic Chiu.

The "last musical period" is the improvised harmonium music which often followed the dinners Gurdjieff held at his Paris apartment during the Occupation and immediate post-war years to his death in 1949. In all, Gurdjieff in collaboration with de Hartmann composed some 200 pieces. In May 2010, 38 minutes of unreleased solo piano music on acetate was purchased by Neil Kempfer Stocker from the estate of his late step-daughter, Dushka Howarth. In 2009, pianist Elan Sicroff released Laudamus: The Music of Georges Ivanovitch Gurdjieff and Thomas de Hartmann, consisting of a selection of Gurdjieff/de Hartmann collaborations (as well as three early romantic works composed by de Hartmann in his teens). In 1998 Alessandra Celletti released "Hidden Sources" (Kha Records) with 18 tracks by Gurdjieff/de Hartmann.

The English concert pianist and composer Helen Perkin (married name Helen Adie) came to Gurdjieff through Ouspensky and first visited Gurdjieff in Paris after the war. She and her husband George Adie emigrated to Australia in 1965 and established the Gurdjieff Society of Newport. Recordings of her performing music by Thomas de Hartmann were issued on CD. But she was also a Movements teacher and composed music for the Movements as well. Some of this music has been published and privately circulated.

==== Movements ====
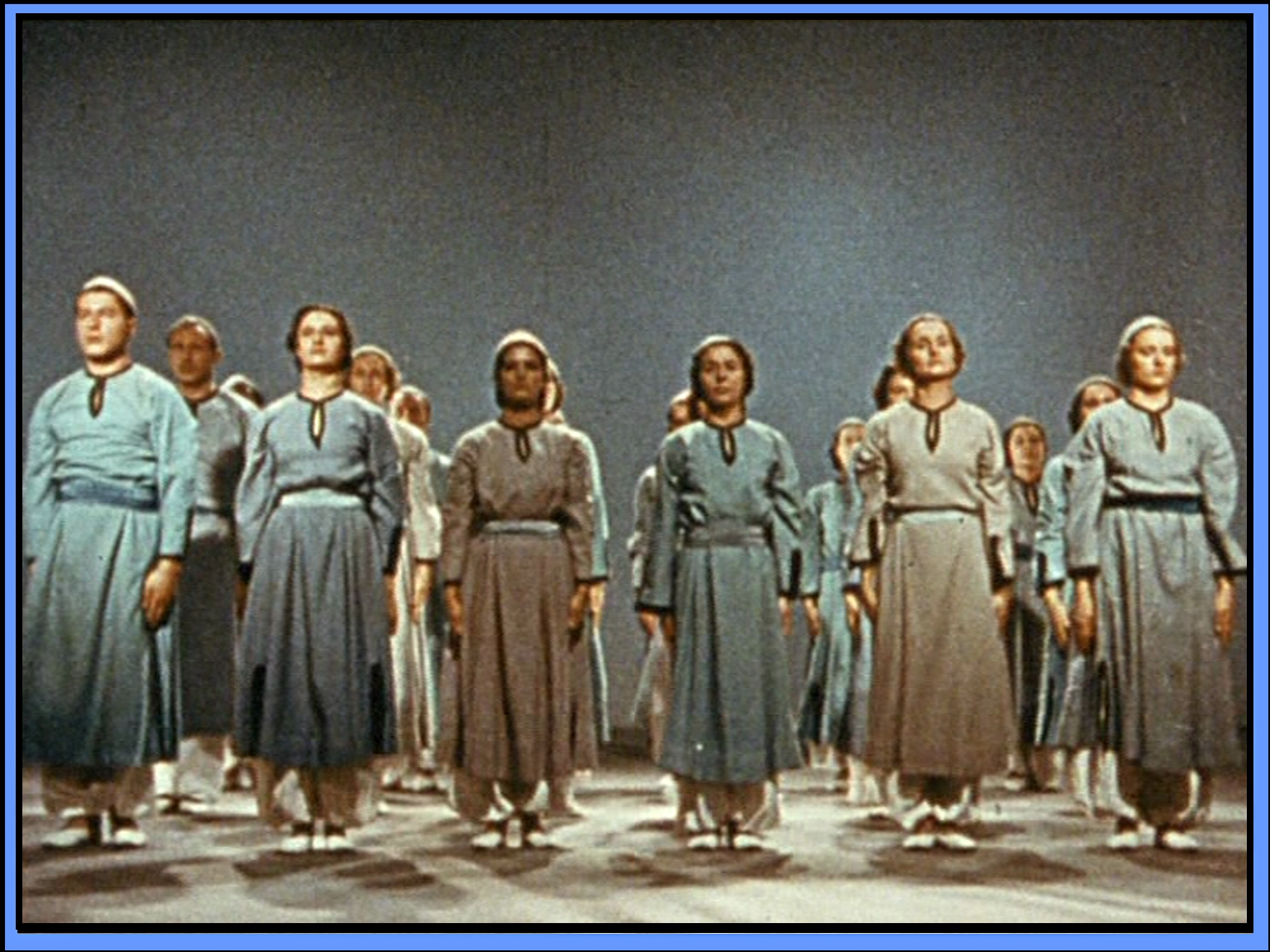
Gurdjieff movements

Movements, or sacred dances, constitute an integral part of the Gurdjieff work. Gurdjieff sometimes referred to himself as a "teacher of dancing" and gained initial public notice for his attempts to put on a ballet in Moscow called Struggle of the Magicians.

In Views from the Real World Gurdjieff wrote, "You ask about the aim of the movements. To each position of the body corresponds a certain inner state and, on the other hand, to each inner state corresponds a certain posture. A man, in his life, has a certain number of habitual postures and he passes from one to another without stopping at those between. Taking new, unaccustomed postures enables you to observe yourself inside differently from the way you usually do in ordinary conditions."

Films of movements demonstrations are occasionally shown for private viewing by the Gurdjieff Foundations, and some examples are shown in a scene in the Peter Brook movie Meetings with Remarkable Men.

== Reception and influence ==
Opinions on Gurdjieff's writings and activities are divided. Sympathizers regard him as a charismatic master who brought new knowledge into Western culture, a psychology and cosmology that enable insights beyond those provided by established science. Osho described Gurdjieff as one of the most significant spiritual masters of this age. At the other end of the spectrum, some critics assert he was a charlatan with a large ego and a constant need for self-glorification.

Gurdjieff gave new life and practical form to ancient teachings of both East and West. For example, the Socratic and Platonic emphasis on know thyself recurs in Gurdjieff's teaching as the practice of self-observation. His teachings about self-discipline and restraint reflect Stoic teachings. The Hindu and Buddhist notion of attachment recurs in Gurdjieff's teaching as the concept of identification. His descriptions of the "three being-foods" matches that of Ayurveda, and his statement that "time is breath" echoes Jyotish, the Vedic system of astrology. Similarly, his cosmology can be "read" against ancient and esoteric sources, respectively Neoplatonic and in such sources as Robert Fludd's treatment of macrocosmic musical structures.

An aspect of Gurdjieff's teachings which has come into prominence in recent decades is the enneagram geometric figure. For many students of the Gurdjieff tradition, the enneagram remains a koan, challenging and never fully explained. There have been many attempts to trace the origins of this version of the enneagram; some similarities to other figures have been found, but it seems that Gurdjieff was the first person to make the enneagram figure publicly known and that only he knew its true source. Others have used the enneagram figure in connection with personality analysis, principally with the Enneagram of Personality as developed by Oscar Ichazo, Claudio Naranjo and others. Most aspects of this application are not directly connected to Gurdjieff's teaching or to his explanations of the enneagram.

Gurdjieff inspired the formation of many groups around the world after his death, all of which still function today and follow his ideas. The Gurdjieff Foundation, the largest organization influenced by the ideas of Gurdjieff, was organized by Jeanne de Salzmann during the early 1950s, and led by her in cooperation with fellow pupils of his. Other pupils of Gurdjieff formed independent groups. Willem Nyland, one of Gurdjieff's closest students and an original founder and trustee of The Gurdjieff Foundation of New York, left to form his own groups in the early 1960s. Jane Heap was sent to London by Gurdjieff, where she led groups until her death in 1964. Louise Goepfert March, who became a pupil of Gurdjieff's in 1929, founded the Rochester Folk Art Guild in 1957, applying Gurdjieff's teaching with practical emphasis on craft making and physical work activities. Independent thriving groups were also formed and initially led by John G. Bennett and A. L. Staveley near Portland, Oregon.

Louis Pauwels, among others, criticizes Gurdjieff for his insistence on considering people as "asleep" in a state closely resembling "hypnotic sleep". Gurdjieff said, even specifically at times, that a pious, good, and moral person was no more "spiritually developed" than any other person; they are all equally "asleep".

Henry Miller approved of Gurdjieff not considering himself holy but, after writing a brief introduction to Fritz Peters' book Boyhood with Gurdjieff, Miller wrote that people are not meant to lead a "harmonious life" as Gurdjieff believed in naming his institute.

In Beelzebub's Tales to His Grandson, Gurdjieff expresses his reverence for the founders of the mainstream religions of East and West and his contempt for what successive generations of believers have made of those religious teachings. His discussions of "orthodoxhydooraki" and "heterodoxhydooraki"—orthodox fools and heterodox fools, from the Russian word durak (fool)—position him as a critic of religious distortion and, in turn, as a target for criticism from some within those traditions. Gurdjieff has been interpreted by some, Ouspensky among others, to have had a total disregard for the value of mainstream religion, philanthropic work and the value of doing right or wrong in general.

Louis Pauwels wrote Monsieur Gurdjieff (first edition published in Paris in 1954 by Editions du Seuil). In an interview, Pauwels said of the Gurdjieff work: "After two years of exercises which both enlightened and burned me, I found myself in a hospital bed with a thrombosed central vein in my left eye and weighing ninety-nine pounds ... Horrible anguish and abysses opened up for me. But it was my fault."

== Pupils ==
Gurdjieff's notable pupils include:

Peter D. Ouspensky (1878–1947) was a Russian journalist, author and philosopher. He met Gurdjieff in 1915 and spent the next five years studying with him, then formed his own independent groups in London in 1921. Ouspensky became the first "career" Gurdjieffian and led independent Fourth Way groups in London and New York for his remaining years. He wrote In Search of the Miraculous about his encounters with Gurdjieff and it remains the best-known and most widely read account of Gurdjieff's early experiments with groups.

Thomas de Hartmann (1885–1956) was a Russian composer. He and his wife Olga first met Gurdjieff in 1916 at Saint Petersburg. They remained Gurdjieff's close students until 1929. During that time they lived at Gurdjieff's Institute for the Harmonious Development of Man near Paris. Between July 1925 and May 1927 Thomas de Hartmann transcribed and co-wrote some of the music that Gurdjieff collected and used for his Movements exercises. They collaborated on hundreds of pieces of concert music arranged for the piano.

This concert music was first recorded and published privately from the 1950s to the 1980s. It was first issued publicly as the Music of Gurdjieff / de Hartmann, Thomas de Hartmann, piano by Triangle Records, with 49 tracks on 4 vinyl disks in 1998, then reissued as a 3-CD set containing 56 tracks in 1989. A more extensive compilation was later issued as the Gurdjieff / de Hartmann Music for the Piano in 4 printed volumes by Schott, between 1996 and 2005, and as audio CDs under the same title in four volumes, with nine discs recorded with three concert pianists, by Schott/Wergo between 1997 and 2001.

Olga de Hartmann (née Arkadievna de Schumacher; 1885–1979) was Gurdjieff's personal secretary during their Prieuré years and took most of the original dictations of his writings during that period. She also authenticated Gurdjieff's early talks in the book Views from the Real World (1973). The de Hartmanns' memoir, Our Life with Mr Gurdjieff (1st ed, 1964, 2nd ed, 1983, 3rd ed 1992), records their Gurdjieff years in great detail. Their Montreal Gurdjieff group, literary and musical estate is represented by retired Canadian National Film Board producer Tom Daly.

Jeanne de Salzmann (1889–1990). Alexander and Jeanne de Salzmann met Gurdjieff in Tiflis in 1919. She was originally a dancer and a Dalcroze Eurythmics teacher. She was, along with Jessmin Howarth and Rose Mary Nott, responsible for transmitting Gurdjieff's choreographed movement exercises and institutionalizing Gurdjieff's teachings through the Gurdjieff Foundation of New York, the Gurdjieff Institute of Paris, London's Gurdjieff Society Inc., and other groups she established in 1953. She also established Triangle Editions in the US, which imprint claims copyright on all Gurdjieff's posthumous writings.

John G. Bennett (1897–1974) was a British intelligence officer, polyglot (fluent in English, French, German, Turkish, Greek, and Italian), technologist, industrial research director, author, and teacher, best known for his many books on psychology and spirituality, particularly the teachings of Gurdjieff. Bennett met both Ouspensky and then Gurdjieff at Istanbul in 1920, spent August 1923 at Gurdjieff's Institute, became Ouspensky's pupil between 1922 and 1941 and, after learning that Gurdjieff was still alive, was one of Gurdjieff's frequent visitors in Paris during 1949. See Witness: the Autobiography of John Bennett (1974), Gurdjieff: Making a New World(1974), Idiots in Paris: diaries of J. G. Bennett and Elizabeth Bennett, 1949 (1991).

Alfred Richard Orage (1873–1934) was an influential British editor best known for the magazine New Age. He began attending Ouspensky's London talks in 1921 and then met Gurdjieff when the latter first visited London early in 1922. Shortly thereafter, Orage sold New Age and relocated to Gurdjieff's institute at the Prieré, and in 1924 was appointed by Gurdjieff to lead the institute's branch in New York. After Gurdjieff's nearly fatal automobile accident in July 1924 and because of his prolonged recuperation during 1924 and intense writing period for several years, Orage continued in New York until 1931. During this period, Orage was responsible for editing the English typescript of Beelzebub's Tales (1931) and Meetings with Remarkable Men (1963) as Gurdjieff's assistant. This period is described in some detail by Paul Beekman Taylor in his Gurdjieff and Orage: Brothers in Elysium (2001).

Maurice Nicoll (1884–1953) was a Harley Street psychiatrist and Carl Jung's delegate in London. Along with Orage, he attended Ouspensky's 1921 London talks where he met Gurdjieff. With his wife Catherine and their daughter, he spent almost a year at Gurdjieff's Prieuré Institute. A year later, when they returned to London, Nicoll rejoined Ouspensky's group. In 1931, on Ouspensky's advice, he started his own Fourth Way groups in England. He is best known for the encyclopedic six-volume series of articles in Psychological Commentaries on the Teaching of Gurdjieff and Ouspensky (Boston: Shambhala, 1996, and Samuel Weiser Inc., 1996).

Willem Nyland (1890–1975) was a Dutch-American chemist who first met Gurdjieff early in 1924 during the latter's first visit to the US. He was a charter member of the NY branch of Gurdjieff's Institute, participated in Orage's meetings between 1924 and 1931, and was a charter member of the Gurdjieff Foundation from 1953 and through its formative years. In the early 1960s he established an independent group in Warwick NY, where he began making reel-to-reel audio recordings of his meetings, which became archived in a private library of some 2600 90-minute audio tapes. Many of these tapes have also been transcribed and indexed, but remain unpublished. Gurdjieff Group Work with Wilhem (sic-Willem) Nyland (1983) by Irmis B. Popoff, sketches Nyland's group work.

Jane Heap (1883–1964) was an American writer, editor, artist, and publisher. She met Gurdjieff during his 1924 visit to New York, and set up a Gurdjieff study group at her apartment in Greenwich Village. In 1925, she moved to Paris to study at Gurdjieff's Institute, and re-established her group in Paris until 1935 when Gurdjieff sent her to London to lead the group that C. S. Nott had established and which she continued to lead until her death. Jane Heap's Paris group became Gurdjieff's 'Rope' group after her departure, and contained several notable writers, including Margaret Anderson, Solita Solano, Kathryn Hulme, and others who proved helpful to Gurdjieff while he was editing his first two books.

Kenneth Macfarlane Walker (1882–1966) was a prominent British surgeon and prolific author. He was a member of Ouspensky's London group for decades, and after the latter's death in 1947 visited Gurdjieff in Paris many times. As well as many accessible medical books for lay readers, he wrote some of the earliest informed accounts of Gurdjieff's ideas, Venture with Ideas (1951) and A Study of Gurdjieff's Teaching (1957).

Henry John Sinclair, 2nd Baron Pentland (1907–1984), was a pupil of Ouspensky's during the 1930s and 1940s. He visited Gurdjieff regularly in Paris in 1949, then was appointed as President of the Gurdjieff Foundation of America by Jeanne de Salzmann when she founded that institution in New York in 1953. He established the Gurdjieff Foundation of California in the mid-1950s and remained President of the US Foundation branches until his death. Pentland also became President of Triangle Editions when it was established in 1974.

Iovanna Lloyd Wright (1925–2015) studied under Gurdjieff in Paris in 1949. When Wright returned to the United States, she taught classes in Gurdjieff's movements to the Taliesin Fellowship, the school of architecture founded in 1932 by her father, Frank Lloyd Wright.

== Writings ==
Three books by Gurdjieff were published in the English language in the United States after his death: Beelzebub's Tales to His Grandson published in 1950 by E. P. Dutton & Co. Inc., Meetings with Remarkable Men, published in 1963 by E. P. Dutton & Co. Inc., and Life is Real Only Then, When 'I Am', printed privately by E. P. Dutton & Co. and published in 1978 by Triangle Editions Inc. for private distribution only. This trilogy is Gurdjieff's legominism, known collectively as All and Everything. A legominism is, according to Gurdjieff, "one of the means of transmitting information about certain events of long-past ages through initiates". A book of his early talks was also collected by his student and personal secretary, Olga de Hartmann, and published in 1973 as Views from the Real World: Early Talks in Moscow, Essentuki, Tiflis, Berlin, London, Paris, New York, and Chicago, as recollected by his pupils.

Gurdjieff's views were initially promoted through the writings of his pupils. The best known and widely read of these is P. D. Ouspensky's In Search of the Miraculous: Fragments of an Unknown Teaching, which is widely regarded as a crucial introduction to the teaching. Others refer to Gurdjieff's own books as the primary texts. Numerous anecdotal accounts of time spent with Gurdjieff were published by Charles Stanley Nott, Thomas and Olga de Hartmann, Fritz Peters, René Daumal, John G. Bennett, Maurice Nicoll, Margaret Anderson and Louis Pauwels, among others.

The feature film Meetings with Remarkable Men (1979), loosely based on Gurdjieff's book by the same name, ends with performances of Gurdjieff's dances known simply as the "exercises" but later promoted as movements. Jeanne de Salzmann and Peter Brook wrote the film, Brook directed, and Dragan Maksimovic and Terence Stamp star, as does South African playwright and actor Athol Fugard.

Gurdjieff wrote a trilogy with the Series title All and Everything. The first volume, finalized by Gurdjieff shortly before his death and first published in 1950, is the First Series and titled An Objectively Impartial Criticism of the Life of Man or Beelzebub's Tales to His Grandson. At 1238 pages it is a lengthy allegorical work that recounts the explanations of Beelzebub to his grandson concerning the beings of the planet Earth and laws which govern the universe. It provides a vast platform for Gurdjieff's deeply considered philosophy. A controversial redaction of Beelzebub's Tales was published by some of Gurdjieff's followers as an alternative "edition", in 1992.

On his page of Friendly Advice facing the first Contents page of Beelzebub's Tales Gurdjieff lays out his own program of three obligatory initial readings of each of the three series in sequence and concludes, "Only then will you be able to count upon forming your own impartial judgement, proper to yourself alone, on my writings. And only then can my hope be actualized that according to your understanding you will obtain the specific benefit for your self which I anticipate."

The posthumous second series, edited by Jeanne de Salzmann, is titled Meetings with Remarkable Men (1963) and is written in a seemingly accessible manner as a memoir of his early years, but also contains some 'Arabian Nights' embellishments and allegorical statements. His posthumous Third Series, (Life Is Real Only Then, When 'I Am'), written as if unfinished and also edited by Jeanne de Salzmann, contains an intimate account of Gurdjieff's inner struggles during his later years, as well as transcripts of some of his lectures. An enormous and growing amount has been written about Gurdjieff's ideas and methods, but his own challenging writings remain the primary sources.

=== List of books by Gurdjieff ===
- Gurdjieff, Georges Ivanovitch (1975). Life is Only Real Then, When 'I am'. Triangle Editions Inc., New York. ISBN 0-525-14547-8.
- Gurdjieff, Georges Ivanovitch (1974). The Herald of Coming Good: First Appeal to Contemporary Humanity. S. Weiser. ISBN 0-87728-049-5. OCLC 317688869.
- Gurdjieff, Georges Ivanovitch (2009). Transcripts of Gurdjieff's Meetings 1941–1946 (Second ed.). London: Book Studio. ISBN 978-0-9559090-5-4. OCLC 785823922.
- All and Everything trilogy:
  - Gurdjieff, Georges Ivanovitch (10 November 2021). Beelzebub's Tales to His Grandson. Rare Treasure Editions. ISBN 978-1-77464-427-0. OCLC 1293986698.
  - Gurdjieff, Georges Ivanovitch (2021). Meetings with Remarkable Men. Rare Treasure Editions. ISBN 978-1-77464-407-2. OCLC 1363838370.
  - Gurdjieff, Georges Ivanovitch (1999). Life is Real Only Then, When 'I Am'. London: Arkana. ISBN 978-0-14-019585-9. OCLC 41073474.
- Gurdjieff, Georges Ivanovich (1984). Views From the Real World: Early Talks in Moscow, Essentuki, Tiflis, Berlin, London, Paris, New York and Chicago. Arkana. ISBN 0-7100-8332-7. OCLC 847108580.
- Gurdjieff, Georges Ivanovitch (2014). The Struggle of the Magicians: Scenario of the Ballet. London: Book Studio. ISBN 978-0-9572481-2-0. OCLC 876287850.
- Gurdjieff, Georges Ivanovitch (2012). Grant, Stephen A. (ed.). In Search of Being: The Fourth Way to Consciousness. Shambhala Publications. ISBN 978-1-61180-037-1. OCLC 794359168.
