= Khoruzhivka =

Khoruzhivka Хоружівка
- Village
- Location within Sumy Oblast Location within Ukraine
- Coordinates: 50°54′43″N 33°48′53″E
- Country: Ukraine
- Oblast: Sumy Oblast
- Raion: Romny Raion
- Hromada: Nedryhailiv settlement hromada
- Elevation: 111 m (364 ft)
- Time zone: UTC+2 (EET)
  - Summer (DST): UTC+3 (EEST)

Khoruzhivka (Ukrainian: Хоружівка) is a village located in Sumy Oblast in northern Ukraine. It lies 111 meters (367 ft) above sea level. Viktor Yushchenko (born 1954), the third President of Ukraine and opposition candidate in the 2004 Ukrainian presidential election, was born there, as well as the composer Thomas de Hartmann (1884–1956).
