= David Hykes =

American composer and meditation teacher (born 1953)

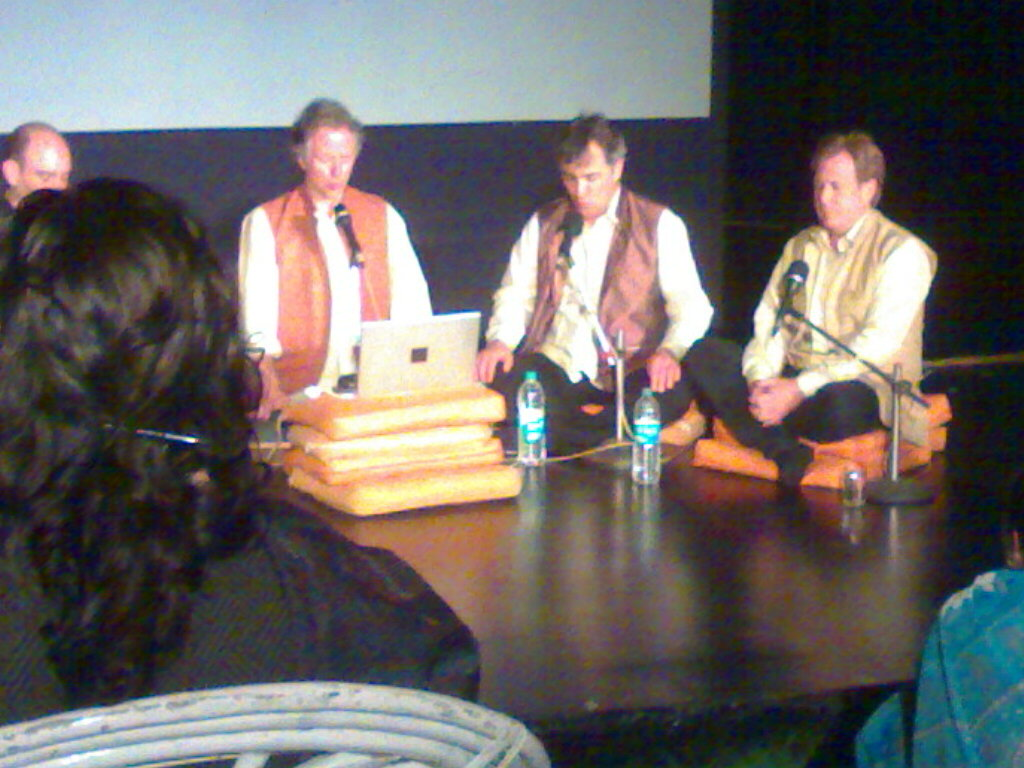
- David Hykes and the Harmonic Choir in Delhi, India, March 2010
- Born: March 2, 1953 (age 72); Taos, New Mexico, US
- Education: Antioch College (B.A.); Columbia University (M.F.A., 1993)
- Occupation: musician
- Known for: overtone singing, David Hykes and the Harmonic Choir
- Website: harmonicworld.com

David Hykes (born March 2, 1953) is an American composer, singer, musician, author, and meditation teacher. He was one of the earliest modern western pioneers of overtone singing, and since 1975 has developed a comprehensive approach to contemplative music which he calls Harmonic Chant (harmonic singing). After early research and trips studying Mongolian, Tibetan, and Middle Eastern singing forms, Hykes began a long series of collaborations with traditions and teachers of wisdom and sacred art, including the Dalai Lama and monks of the Gyume and Gyuto Orders.

Hykes founded the Harmonic Choir in 1975, and has performed and taught Harmonic Chant and the related Harmonic Presence work in America, France, Germany, Italy, Switzerland, Japan, Australia and many other countries. Of overtone singing and his own study of the form, music theorist Charles Madden writes, "David Hykes has done everything I had hoped to do, and more." His choir incorporates both basic overtone singing as well as additional advanced forms.

His work is organised within The Harmonic Presence Foundation.

His song, "Rainbow Voice", has been featured in the films Blade: Trinity (2004), Blade (1998), Baraka (1992), and Dead Poets Society (1989).

== Education ==
Hykes was educated at Antioch College in Yellow Springs, Ohio where he studied with avant-garde experimental filmmakers Tony Conrad and Paul Sharits, free jazz with the Cecil Taylor Unit, and contemporary, classical and medieval music with John Ronsheim and David Stock. He received an M.F.A. from Columbia University in New York in 1993. For many years he studied North Indian raga singing and the history of Indian music with Sheila Dhar.

David Hykes is a Dharma student of Chökyi Nyima Rinpoche, who gave him the name Shenpen Yeshe, "the Primordial Wisdom that brings happiness to beings," and Tsoknyi Rinpoche. He completed twenty years of spiritual studies in the Gurdjieff Foundations in New York, San Francisco, and Paris, as a student of Gurdjieff's successors Lord John Pentland and Dr. Michel de Salzmann. Over the years he has received teachings from Tibetan Buddhist masters including Dhuksey Rinpoché and the Dalai Lama, as well as the Gyuto and Gyume Monks, whom he helped bring to the United States for the first time in 1985–86.

== Awards ==
- 1976 Rockefeller Foundation, Music, for his development of Harmonic Chant, a global sacred music
- 1978 National Endowment for the Arts, Music, for his development of Harmonic Chant, a global sacred music
