= Fakir =

Sufi Muslim ascetic and renunciate

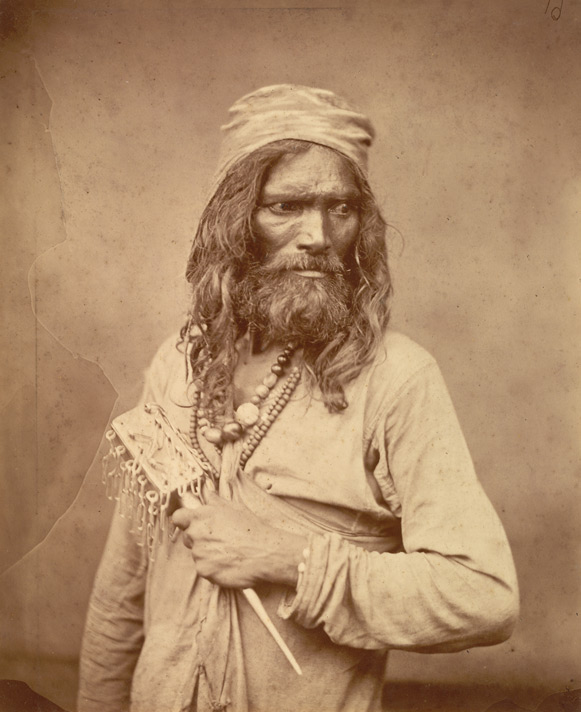
A fakir in Bengal during the 1860s

Fakir, faqeer, or faqīr (/fəˈkɪər/; Arabic: فقیر), derived from faqr (Arabic: فقر, 'poverty'), is an Islamic term traditionally used for Sufi ascetics who renounce their worldly possessions and dedicate their lives to the worship of God. They do not necessarily renounce all relationships, or take vows of poverty, but the adornments of the temporal worldly life are kept in perspective. The connotations of poverty associated with the term relate to their spiritual neediness, not necessarily their physical neediness, which they adopt to seek purity and mystical knowledge and so earn God’s love.

They are characterized by their reverence for dhikr (a devotional practice which consists of repeating the names of God with various formulas, often performed after the daily prayers). Sufism in the Muslim world emerged during the early Umayyad Caliphate (661–750 CE) and grew as a mystic tradition in the mainstream Sunni and Shia denominations of Islam, which according to Eric Hanson and Karen Armstrong was likely in reaction to "the growing worldliness of Umayyad and Abassid societies". Sufi Muslim ascetics (fakirs and dervishes) were highly influential and greatly successful in spreading Islam between the 10th and 19th centuries, particularly to the furthest outposts of the Muslim world in the Middle East and North Africa, the Balkans and Caucasus, the Indian subcontinent, and finally Central, Eastern, and Southeast Asia. Sufi Muslims have spread throughout several continents and cultures over a millennium, originally expressing their beliefs in Arabic, before spreading into Persian, Turkish, Indian languages, and a dozen other languages.

The term fakir has taken on a more recent and colloquial usage for an ascetic who renounces worldly possessions, and has even been applied to non-Muslims. Fakirs are prevalent in the Middle East and South Asia; they are thought to be self-sufficient and possess only the spiritual need for God. The term is also frequently applied to Hindu ascetics (e.g., sadhus, gurus, swamis, and yogis). These usages developed primarily in the Mughal era in the Indian subcontinent. There is also a distinct clan of faqeers found in North India, descended from communities of fakirs who took up residence at Sufi shrines.

== History ==
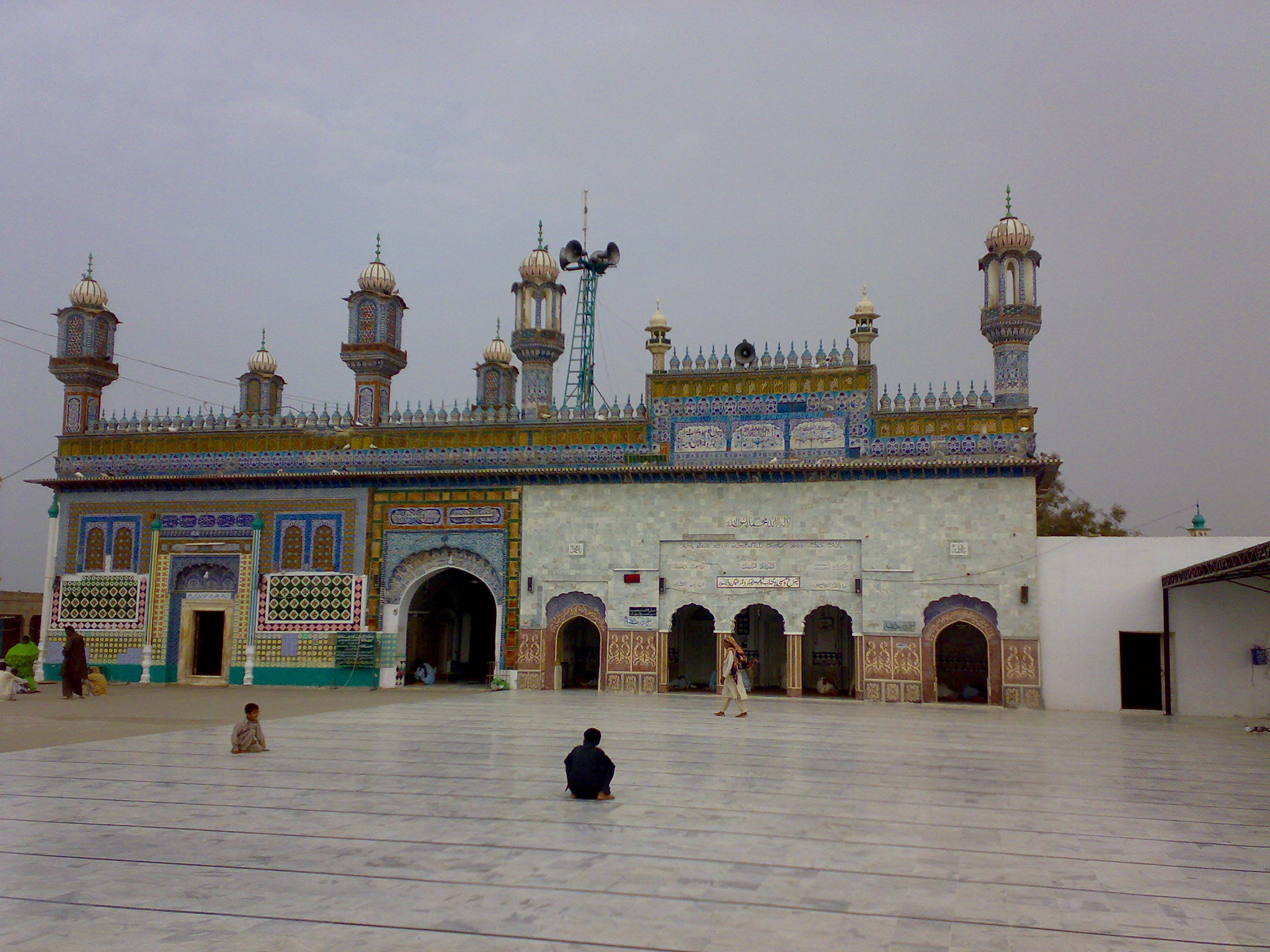
Shrine of a Sufi Muslim fakir named Sultan Bahoo in Punjab, Pakistan

Ḥusayn ibn ʿAlī, who was the son of ʿAlī ibn Abī Ṭālib and grandson of Muhammad, is believed to have written a book, Mirat ul-Arfeen, on the topic of tasawwuf, which is said to be the first book on Sufism. However, under Umayyad rule, this book was not allowed to be published and openly discussing tasawwuf, Sufism, or faqr was not allowed. For a long time after Ḥusayn ibn ʿAlī, information and teachings about faqr, tasawwuf, and Sufism was transferred from person to person.

In English, faqir or fakir originally meant a mendicant dervish. In its mystical usage, the word fakir refers to man's spiritual need for God, who alone is regarded as self-sufficient in Islam. Although of Muslim origin, the term has come to be applied in the Indian subcontinent to Hindu ascetics and mystics as well, alongside Indian terms such as gosvamin, sadhu, bhikku, and other designations. Fakirs are generally regarded as holy men who possess supernatural or miraculous powers. Among Muslims, the leading Sufi orders (tariqa) of fakirs are the Shadhiliyyah, Chishtiyah, Qadiriyah, Naqshbandiyah, and Suhrawardiyah. The Cambridge English Dictionary defines the term fakir as "a member of an Islamic religious group, or a holy man".

== Attributes ==
The attributes of a fakir have been defined by many Muslim scholars.

The early Muslim scholar, Abdul-Qadir Gilani, defined Sufism, tasawwuf and faqr in a conclusive manner. Explaining the attributes of a fakir, he says, "faqir is not who can not do anything and is nothing in his self-being. But faqir has all the commanding powers (gifted from Allah) and his orders can not be revoked."

Ibn Arabi explained Sufism, including faqr, in more detail. He wrote more than 500 books on the topic. He was the first Muslim scholar to openly introduce the idea of Wahdat al-wujud. His writings are considered a solid source that has defied time.

Another well-known Muslim saint, Sultan Bahoo, describes a fakir as one "who has been entrusted with full authority from Allah (God)". In the same book, Sultan Bahoo says, "Faqir attains eternity by dissolving himself in oneness of Allah. He, when, eliminates himself from other than Allah, his soul reaches to divinity." He says in another book, "faqir has three steps (stages). First step he takes from eternity (without beginning) to this mortal world, second step from this finite world to hereafter and last step he takes from hereafter to manifestation of Allah."

== Gurdjieff ==
In the Fourth Way teaching of G. I. Gurdjieff, the word fakir is used to denote the specifically physical path of development, as opposed to the words yogi (which Gurdjieff used for a path of mental development) and monk (which he used for the path of emotional development).

== See also ==
- Ghous-e-Azam
- Madariyya
- Qalandariyya
- Sai Baba of Shirdi
- Shramana
- Wu wei
- Baul
- Aghori
