= Diana Huebert =

American modern dance and Gurdjieff philosophy devotee (1899–1983)

Diana Huebert (born Josephine Campbell; 1899–1983), later Diana Huebert Faidy, was a Chicago modern dancer and advocate of the experimental humanities.

== Early life ==
She was first exposed to dancing through her father, who was a ballet teacher in Chicago. Although she was classically trained, she left Chicago to study experimental and avant-garde forms of "free" dancing, in the vein of Isadora Duncan. In Paris, she studied under Raymond Duncan, the brother of her idol, and then traveled throughout Europe seeing performances of modern dance.

She became a member of the Chicago Gurdjieff group. She married architect Abel Faidy around 1939, and there is no record of any children from this marriage.

== Career ==
Upon her return to the United States, she became a professional dancer, dance teacher, lecturer, and producer.

== Later years ==
She retired in 1969, four years after her husband Abel Faidy’s death. She spent her retirement attempting to memorialize her husband's architectural and design work. She also wrote memoirs of her experiences with Georges Gurdjieff in the 1970s, which she submitted to the Gurdjieff Foundation.

== Death ==
Huebert died in Chicago in 1983.
