= Stuart Lyons =

British film producer

Stuart Lyons (1928 in Manchester, England – 23 February 1998) was a British film producer.

== Producer ==
- Something to Believe In (1998) (line producer)
- Meetings with Remarkable Men (1979)
- The Slipper and the Rose (1976)

== Casting director ==
- The Blue Max (1966)
- Those Magnificent Men in Their Flying Machines (1965)
- Guns at Batasi (1964)
- The Damned (1963)
- Pirates of Blood River (1962)
- The Curse of the Werewolf (1961)
- Shadow of the Cat (1961)
- Taste of Fear (1961) a.k.a. Scream of Fear (US)
- Sword of Sherwood Forest (1960)
