= Thomas de Hartmann =

Ukrainian-born composer and pianist (1884 - 1956)

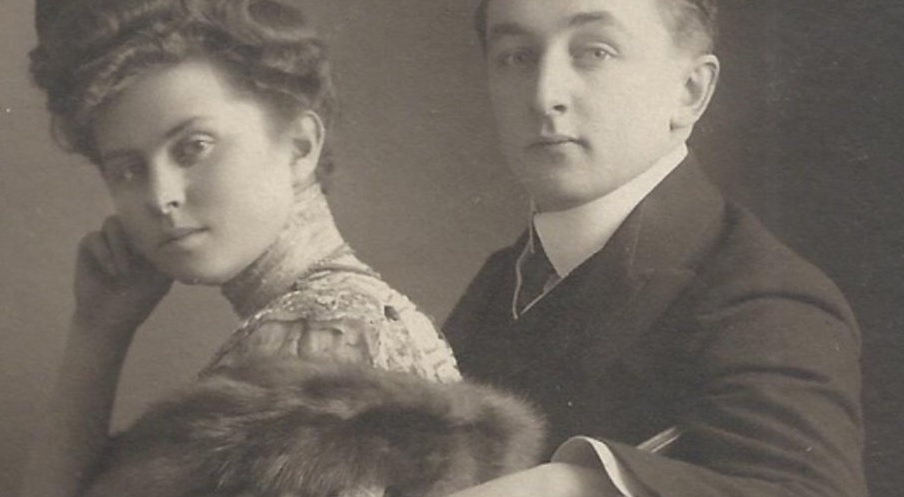
- Wedding picture (part), 12 (25) Nov. 1906
- Born: Thomas Alexandrovich de Hartmann; October 3, 1884 [O.S.: September 21] Khoruzhivka, Russian Empire
- Died: March 28, 1956 (aged 71); Princeton, New Jersey, U.S.
- Education: Saint Petersburg Conservatory
- Occupation: Composer
- Spouse: Olga Arkadievna de Schumacher (1885-1979)

Thomas Alexandrovich de Hartmann (Russian: Фома́ Алекса́ндрович Га́ртман; October 3 [O.S.: September 21], 1884 – March 28, 1956) was a Ukrainian-born composer, pianist and professor of composition.

== Life ==
De Hartmann was born on his father's estate in Khoruzhivka, Poltava Governorate, Russian Empire (now Ukraine), to Alexander Fomich de Hartmann and Olga Alexandrovna de Hartmann, née de Kross, both of German descent. On his father’s death, when he was nine years old, he was sent by his mother to the First Cadet Corps, the same military school his father had attended, and later the Page Corps. Upon graduation from the Page Corps, de Hartmann entered into the Russian Imperial Guard.

In the fall of 1896, at the age of 11, de Hartmann began individual lessons with Anton Arensky, and continued them until Arensky’s death in 1906. At that time, de Hartmann chose Sergei Taneyev as his new musical mentor. He took lessons on counterpoint from Taneyev, and they remained friends till Taneyev’s death. De Hartmann graduated from the Imperial Conservatory of Music, where he studied musical composition with Nikolai Rimsky-Korsakov. His piano teacher was Anna Yesipova (the second wife and former student of Theodor Leschetizky).

In 1906, de Hartmann met Olga Arkadievna de Schumacher, daughter of Arkady Alexandrovich von Schumacher (June 7, 1855 - June 8, 1938), Head of the Debt Repayment Commission in St. Petersburg, and Olga Konstantinovna von Wulffert (1860 - April 3, 1939), who both died in Paris. They married on 25 November [O.S. 12 November] 1906. In the same year, de Hartmann began composing what would prove to be the most ambitious production of his career – La Fleurette rouge, a ballet in 5 acts and 8 scenes, of 3 hours duration. It was first performed in December, 1907, at the Mariinsky Theater in St. Petersburg, produced by Nikolay Legat with Vaslav Nijinsky and Tamara Karsavina in the cast, and later, in 1911, at the Bolshoi Theater in Moscow. De Hartmann dedicated La Fleurette rouge to his wife.

It was while his ballet was being performed in repertory that de Hartmann wanted to take lessons on conducting from Felix Mottl in Munich, Germany, but as he was in military service, he was barred from travelling abroad. At that time, Grand Duchess Olga, the youngest sister of Tsar Nicolas II, liked to play the violin, and de Hartmann would sometimes accompany her on the piano. When the Grand Duchess learned that de Hartmann wanted to study with Mottl, she arranged for the Tsar to meet de Hartmann, and as a result, de Hartmann was put into the military reserves, allowing him to travel abroad.

In 1908, de Hartmann went to Munich to work with Mottl, and there he met Wassily Kandinsky. At this time, de Hartmann was becoming disenchanted with traditional harmonization, and Kandinsky's avant-garde approach to art was very attractive to him. The two collaborated on various stage works, but none was performed in their lifetimes.

While in Munich, Thomas de Hartmann met the artist, former Sufi student and later stage impresario, Alexander de Salzmann; they were both friends of Rainer Maria Rilke and Kandinsky.

From 1912 to 1914, de Hartmann divided his time between Munich and his estate in Khoruzhivka, working on various compositions and stage productions. When war was declared in 1914, de Hartmann was recalled to military service and moved to Tsarskoye Selo, where his regiment was located.

In December, 1916 de Hartmann met George Gurdjieff, who became his spiritual teacher. De Hartmann and his wife met with Gurdjieff in St. Petersburg a few times before being assigned, in late February, 1917, to the reserve forces near the Austrian front in Ukraine. He travelled to Kiev, and his wife followed him, staying with de Hartmann's sister who was living there. In April, 1917, de Hartmann was assigned to Masslennikov and Shmyakov, members of the State Duma, and later that month he was reassigned to travel with Rodzyanko. They all travelled to Minsk to attend the first congress of representatives of the Western Front. Later, de Hartmann would introduce de Salzmann and Gurdjieff to each other.

In August, 1917, the Main Artillery Directorate sent de Hartmann to Rostov-on-the-Don to "speed up the production of a model of [his] system of anti-airplane machines." (He had previously invented a kind of periscope arrangement for firing guns from the trenches without the soldiers poking their heads out to aim. It had been accepted by the army and had begun production, but it was too late to save the Russian army, and was obsolete by the time of the Second World War.)

In November, 1917, while he was travelling, he fell ill with typhoid in Sochi, and was granted leave for three months, whereupon he rejoined Gurdjieff, who had moved to Yessentuki. He was released from military service in February, 1918, and continued to stay and work with Gurdjieff, later travelling with him to Tiflis (Tbilisi). In 1919, de Hartmann was appointed Professor of Music at the Tiflis Conservatory, and during this time, he wrote music for a pair of stage productions. In 1920, the de Hartmanns travelled with Gurdjieff to Constantinople, and, from there, to Berlin in 1921, Paris in 1922, then in October, 1922, moved into the Prieuré d'Avon in Fontainebleau, south of Paris. The de Hartmanns remained there with Gurdjieff until 1929.

In June, 1929, de Hartmann broke with Gurdjieff and moved to Courbevoie with his wife's parents. His wife continued to work with Gurdjieff, splitting her time between the Prieuré and Courbevoie, finally leaving Gurdjieff for good at the beginning of 1930. At this time, to make a living, de Hartmann arranged the orchestral music of other composers for chamber groups, which could be played more cheaply on the radio, and he wrote music for films.

Having established an income from the royalties of his arrangements and film music, the de Hartmanns lived first in Courbevoie, then in Garches, south of Paris until 1950. De Hartmann had his orchestral music conducted by such conductors as Bigot, Stokowski, and others, and his concertos and sonatas were played by such soloists as Casals, Tortelier, Rampal, and Alèz.

In 1950, at the request of Jeanne de Salzmann after Gurdjieff’s death, the de Hartmanns moved to the United States to support the Gurdjieff work there, first joining Frank Lloyd Wright at Taliesin, then moving to New York. De Hartmann, who had become well-known in Europe, had to start again from the beginning in the new world to build up his reputation. As he said in a letter to Frank Lloyd Wright, "…to be played on the radio – it is necessary to be famous. In order to be famous, it is necessary to be played on the radio." He was hampered by ill health, and spent much of his time working on publications of the Gurdjieff/de Hartmann music.

De Hartmann suffered a heart attack in 1954, and was ill for some time. He gradually recovered, and his last year was very productive – he was working on his Fourth Symphony and preparing to play for a recital of his works in New York, when he suffered a fatal heart attack on March 28, 1956. After his death, his wife continued to promote his music until her death at her home near Nambé, Santa Fe County, New Mexico. Both she and her husband are buried in the Princeton Cemetery, Princeton, New Jersey.

== Association with Anton Arensky ==
De Hartmann first met Anton Stepanovich Arensky in the fall of 1896. One Sunday, when he was visiting his aunt, who was a friend of Arensky’s mother and sister, she took him to Arensky’s house so that he could hear de Hartmann play piano. Arensky gave him a theme on which to improvise, and having heard the result, accepted de Hartmann as his only pupil. De Hartmann finished the Conservatory course under Arensky’s tutelage, learning harmony, strict style, fugue and free composition.

He remained Arensky’s pupil until Arensky’s death in 1906. Arensky’s influence on de Hartmann might best be summarized by a statement of Taneyev’s. One day, when de Hartmann visited Taneyev with part of his ballet La Fleurette rouge, Taneyev asked de Hartmann to play it on the piano, while he and other guests who were there listened. At the end, Taneyev said: “Your harmony can be compared only with Arensky’s harmony. This is the highest compliment that I can give you.”

== Association with Sergei Taneyev ==
De Hartmann first met Sergei Ivanovich Taneyev at Arensky’s house when he was still at the conservatory. He had with him some exercises in harmony from the conservatory, and Taneyev sat at the piano and analyzed them, along with Modest Tchaikovsky and Felix Blumenfeld who were also there visiting Arensky. After this, de Hartmann did not see Taneyev for several years.

De Hartmann renewed his acquaintance with Taneyev when Arensky was unwell and living in Finland. In the fall of 1905, de Hartmann had finished the orchestration of one act of the ballet and wanted feedback about it. He decided to drop in on Taneyev to show him the ballet. Taneyev very cordially received his friend’s pupil.

After Arensky’s death in 1906, de Hartmann dropped in on Taneyev on the way to his estate, and de Hartmann invited him to come to stay at his estate in Ukraine during the summer. Taneyev visited that year and the next, Taneyev instructing de Hartmann in counterpoint and fugue during this time.

Taneyev was de Hartmann’s mentor during his years of doubt, when he felt that traditional music was at a dead end, and he wanted to find a new path. As de Hartmann wrote in his memoir about Taneyev: “I had passed Strict Style and Forms with Arensky, but I also wished to study Fugue with Taneyev. At that time, it had already started to slowly become clear to me that the time has come to look for new ways in music. Neither then or now did I stop liking the composers, particularly the Russian ones, which I had already liked as a boy. Of course, I particularly liked my teacher Arensky, The Five [Mily Balakirev, César Cui, Modest Mussorgsky, Nikolai Rimsky-Korsakov and Alexander Borodin], Glazunov, Rachmaninov and others, and I still do. But it is one thing to like them. The other was my own composition. Here it was necessary to search for something new. And so, before this search I wished to know all the previous techniques. That was the time when questions were still alive. So I began to work with Taneyev on the fugue.”

Taneyev encouraged de Hartmann to continue his composing, to work on large compositions: “First of all I wish to chastise you for not composing anything. It seems to me that you attach more significance to exercises in counterpoint than you should. More than anyone else I am inclined to recognize their usefulness. But I find that they should be written in the intervals between composing, and in any case composing must be in the forefront. It is not sufficient to develop technique in one direction – its all-rounded development is possible only in practice. Even if some compositions in the beginning turn out to be unsatisfactory. It is possible to avoid these or those deficiencies in the compositions which follow. But one should not limit oneself to “daydreams about opera or ballet.” You need to compose in large formats – sonatas and so on. Start a symphony, an overture – something of that kind. It is difficult to find better conditions for this than those you have in Khoruzhevka. When large things will have been written by you, then it can be easy to answer your question about the level of your technical skills. If there are some deficiencies in this connection, they will not be difficult to correct and in this case some technical exercises can definitely be of great use. They can be compared to technical piano exercises, which promote the development of technique and are necessary also for the finished virtuosos. But the one, who, besides these exercises, would play nothing further on the piano and for several years would not learn even one piece, would perhaps completely forget how to play. In the end, you also could lose the habit of composing. It seems to me that composition must be your chief occupation, which everything else obeys. And then both exercises in counterpoint and work with Mottl take on a definite purpose and contribute to one main goal. Otherwise all this is, if not completely aimless, then barely attaining those goals which are hardly worth pursuing – in rehearsing operas with singers, the very best that can be attained is to become a good concertmaster. And so, Thomas Alexandrovich, before everything it is necessary to compose, tirelessly and continually, and to evaluate everything else only from this point of view – in so far as it assists or hinders this goal.”

In Munich in 1908, Taneyev met with Kandinsky and his fellow painters, and later he wrote to de Hartmann in a letter: “It was very nice to learn that my quartet pleased Mr. Kandinsky, and on my next trip to Munich I will try to become acquainted with those decadent pictures which will be painted under the influence of my music.” Taneyev and de Hartmann remained in close touch up to the time of Taneyev’s death in 1915.

== Association with Wassily Kandinsky ==
In 1908, de Hartmann went to Munich to work on conducting with Felix Mottl, and there he met Wassily Kandinsky. At that time, de Hartmann was beginning to feel the need to go on a new music path. When he visited Kandinsky’s studio for the first time, he was very much taken by the movement of the colours in the woodcuts he was shown, despite the static nature of the medium. Kandinsky showed de Hartmann that traditional forms were not necessary to express one’s inner intention. As de Hartmann wrote in 1912 in The Blaue Reiter Almanac: “In all the arts, and especially in music, every method that arises from an inner necessity is right. The composer wants to express what at the moment is the intention of his intuition. At this moment he might feel the need for a combination of sounds, which, according to present theory, is regarded as cacophonous. It is obvious that such a judgement of theory cannot be considered an obstacle in this case. The artist is compelled to use such a combination because its use was determined by his inner voice: the correspondence of the means of expression with inner necessity is the essence of beauty in a work.”

Kandinsky and de Hartmann were joined by Alexander Sacharoff, a young and talented dancer. They began working on a stage production based on “Daphnis and Chloe”, but when they realized that Fokine and Diaghilev were working with the same theme, they dropped this project. However, Sacharoff continued his study of ancient Greek dancing from his studies of images on pottery in museums, and in 1910 he presented his interpretations to chamber music by de Hartmann in the Tonhalle in Munich. These solo dance presentations continued into 1911.

Kandinsky and de Hartmann continued their collaboration on a stage production called “The Yellow Sound.” Its scenario was published in The Blaue Reiter Almanac, and sketches of the music were made, but war intervened and the production was never completed in their lifetime. In 1982, the Guggenheim Foundation premiere of Kandinsky's opera Der gelbe Klang was made possible thanks to a complete rearrangement by Gunther Schuller of de Hartmann's hitherto lost work. From this composition, which very freely adapted the sketches that de Hartmann wrote, it is clear why Konstantin Stanislavski could not understand the work when de Hartmann proposed it for the Moscow Art Theatre in 1914.

Kandinsky and de Hartmann reunited in Paris in the 1930’s, but never again collaborated on a project. Kandinsky died in 1944. De Hartmann wrote in his memoir: “I will finish my recollection of Kandinsky with the scene when I saw him for the last time, two days before his death. His wife had asked me to cheer him up, and had left the room. I was alone before Kandinsky, who was dying. He smiled at me, then went to sleep. I looked at him and at his pictures which hung on the wall, pictures he loved most. One was from the period of his first large ‘Compositions,’ the period of some imaginary catastrophes and destructions corresponding to that level which in Hindu philosophy is called the plane of suffering. They were painted during the years when no one could imagine that such catastrophes could take place, that here, on the so-called physical plane, there would be such disasters, wars and revolutions. Some people would not pay attention, but others would see in these pictures a sort of foretelling. And then I looked at another picture, one from his last period – unearthly blue space, in it, correct geometrical figures, and over the whole reigned peace, harmony, a kind of wonderful oneness in multiplicity. A quite different, very high spiritual world. In Hindu philosophy, the enlightened world of high Reason. Perhaps here also my friend Kandinsky had foreseen the coming of a spiritual awakening, when the inner sound will be heard by everyone.”

== Association with G.I. Gurdjieff ==
From the time of his early days in Khoruzhevka, de Hartmann was interested in the Kabbalah. As he wrote in a memoir of his youth: "My interest in Jewry began when, still in my youth, in my philosophical searches I stumbled across Hermeticism in connection with Bereshit and the philosophy of the Kabbalah. From the very first pages of the original of the Kabbalah I paid attention to its depth, and also to the ideological similarity of Ein Sof with Brahma. Further I became interested in Hasidism, its loving attitude to the suffering of the Jewish poor, with its healers so close in spirit to our Elders."

This philosophical interest would have been supported in his association with Taneyev and Kandinsky. As de Hartmann wrote in one of his memoirs: “As I learned later, in Taneyev’s library were also the Upanishads and Sutras, and other books connected with the field of Hindu Philosophy. He knew Schopenhauer and was a great admirer of Spinoza. He had made a graphic design, picturing the scheme of the logical construction of the principals expounded in Spinoza’s Ethics.” Undoubtedly there would have been conversations about these subjects during Taneyev’s stays with de Hartmann and his wife in Khoruzhevka.

After Taneyev’s death, de Hartmann continued his search for spiritual guidance, and in December, 1916, he met Georgi Ivanovich Gurdjieff in St. Petersburg. Over the next few months, Thomas and Olga de Hartmann had some opportunities to meet with Gurdjieff, and he became a big spiritual influence on them. But de Hartmann was in the army, and the war intervened. Olga de Hartmann recounts a meeting with Gurdjieff: “I told him that my husband had to go to the front and that neither of us would remain in the city much longer, as I wanted to follow my husband as far as I would be allowed to go. I also asked whether it was not possible for my husband to avoid going to the front. ‘No,’ he said, ‘when you live among wolves, you have to howl like a wolf; but you should not be taken over by the psychosis of war, and inside you should try to be far removed from all this.’”

During the time that de Hartmann was at the front, Gurdjieff travelled to the Caucasus, where the de Hartmanns were able to rejoin him in August, 1917, in Yessentuki. In the Caucasus, de Hartmann was exposed to the music of Komitas, who at that time was virtually unknown in his own country, and to genuine Eastern music ensembles. Though de Hartmann wrote music with Eastern themes in his ballet La Fleurette rouge, this was a revelation. As de Hartmann wrote: “… Mr. Gurdjieff gave us another opportunity of listening to real Eastern music and musicians, so that I could better understand how he wished his own music to be written and interpreted.”

Gurdjieff intensified work on his ballet The Struggle of the Magicians, and fragments of music for it were composed. This ballet was conceived of as far back as 1915 in Russia, but now with a composer available, Gurdjieff began to plot dances and scenes for this ballet. Though the libretto of the ballet was written, and music in various stages of composition exists, this ballet was never completed.

After the de Hartmanns followed Gurdjieff to France, settling first in Paris, then at the Prieuré des Basses-Loges in Fontainebleau-Avon, work continued on these dances, but in a new direction – a demonstration of them, now called Sacred Dances and Exercises, was planned for the Théâtre des Champs-Elysées in Paris in December of 1923, followed by demonstrations in New York, Boston and Chicago in the United States in 1924. During this time, de Hartmann transcribed and co-wrote much of the music that Gurdjieff collected and used for his movements exercises. For these dances, some of the old music was used, but more had to be composed and everything had to be orchestrated.

After returning to the Prieuré, Gurdjieff was involved in a serious car accident. After his recovery, the direction of his work changed, and he began working with de Hartmann on a new direction of music. This music consists of generally short pieces of piano music, often consisting of a melody in the right hand and a rhythmic harmonization in the left, though there are many exceptions to this. One of the aphorisms in Gurdjieff’s work is: “Take the understanding of the East with the knowledge of the West – and then seek.” The same might be said of this music – it is a combination of Eastern type melodies and themes brought by Gurdjieff, worked on with the Western knowledge of Thomas de Hartmann. The resulting pieces are quite unique in de Hartmann’s music life.

Gurdjieff and de Hartmann worked on this music from 1925 to 1927, but the need to earn money to help support the Prieuré led de Hartmann to work first on arrangements of the works of other composers, and then for scores for film music. As a result of this, his musical work with Gurdjieff came to an end. He left Gurdjieff in 1929. Some of this music was later adapted by Laurence Rosenthal for the 1979 Peter Brook film Meetings with Remarkable Men.

== Music ==
In Thomas de Hartmann’s earliest works, one can see the Russian Romanticism of Arensky and Taneyev. By 1908, Kandinsky’s Impressionism and Modernism are seen. From 1916 to 1929, Gurdjieff led him to study the music of the East. Starting in 1929, his work on film music led him to add world music, bitonality, jazz and ultra-modernism to his compositions. Thus, de Hartmann became a poly-stylist. He would, in a single work, use a rich combination of techniques, both compositional and expressive, to convey what he wished to say. Other influences on his works include the Russian fairy tales he had heard from childhood, which often tell the story of a quest. His ballet La Fleurette Rouge is based on one such fairy tale, written in this early Russian Romantic style, while his Twelve Russian Fairy Tales were written in his more mature style of the 1930s. De Hartmann was also influenced by poetry and other writings, and many of his pieces are based on poems or writings by prominent authors such as Shelley, Pushkin, Verlaine, Joyce and others. Shapes and colours, which Kandinsky believed had specific meanings, were also inspirations for his works. His Yellow Sound and Lumière noire communicate contrasting colours, and his Fête de la Patronne is based on a painting by Degas.

His compositional output can be summarized thus: 18 orchestral works, 15 chamber music works, music for 14 stage works, 20+ collections of piano works, 40+ song cycles, 4 volumes of music in collaboration with G.I. Gurdjieff, 50+ works for film, 12 arrangements of works by other composers.

== Recordings ==
- The Music of Gurdjieff/de Hartmann, Thomas de Hartmann, piano, three disc set, Triangle Editions, TCD1001-1003, 1989
- The Orchestral Music of Thomas de Hartmann, Lviv National Philharmonic Orchestra of Ukraine, conducted by Tian Hui Ng, Elan Sicroff, pianist. Nimbus Records, NI6429, 2022.
- Thomas de Hartmann: Orchestral Music, Lviv National Philharmonic Orchestra of Ukraine, conducted by Theodore Kuchar, Bülent Evcil, flute. Toccata Classics, TOCC0633, 2022.
- The Piano Music of Thomas de Hartmann, Elan Sicroff, pianist. Nimbus Records, NI6409, 2016.
- The Chamber Music of Thomas de Hartmann, Elan Sicroff, pianist, various instrumentalists. Nimbus Records, NI 6411, 2021.
- The Songs of Thomas de Hartmann, Nina Lejderman, soprano, Claron McFadden, soprano, Elan Sicroff, pianist. Nimbus Records, NI 6413, 2021.
- The complete Piano Music of Georges I. Gurdjieff and Thomas de Hartmann, Cecil Lytle, pianist, 6-CD boxed set, , Celestial Harmonies 19904-2
- G.I. Gurdjieff: Sacred Hymns, by Keith Jarrett, ECM 1174, September 1980
- Hidden Sources - Gurdjieff, De Hartmann, by Alessandra Celletti (KHA Records, 1998)
- Sacred Honey - Gurdjieff, De Hartmann, by Alessandra Celletti
- Echoes From the Real World - Gurdjieff, De Hartmann, 21 compositions for solo piano; Mario Sollazzo, pianist. , KHA Records, Italy, 2015

== Writings ==
Our Life with Mr. Gurdjieff (1983), The "Definitive Edition" substantially enlarged from the original 1964 edition via the inclusion of unpublished materials and drawing upon the memoirs of Olga de Hartmann (co-authored with Olga de Hartmann, who was Gurdjieff's personal secretary for many years.). Arkana Books
