= In Search of the Miraculous =

Book by P.D. Oespenski

In Search of the Miraculous: Fragments of an Unknown Teaching
- First edition (publ. Harcourt Brace)
- Author: P. D. Ouspensky
- Subject: Philosophy, Spirituality
- Genre: Non-fiction
- Publication date: 1949

In Search of the Miraculous: Fragments of an Unknown Teaching is a 1949 book by Russian philosopher P. D. Ouspensky which recounts his meeting and subsequent association with George Gurdjieff.

According to Sophia Wellbeloved, the book is generally regarded as the most comprehensive account of Gurdjieff's system of thought ever published, as it often forms the basis from which Gurdjieff and his teachings are understood.

== Contents ==
In Search of the Miraculous is Ouspensky's recollection of his first meeting and subsequent association with George Gurdjieff and the esoteric teaching that Gurdjieff imparted to him. This teaching still exists today in various forms; Ouspensky himself taught it to various groups from 1921–1947. Throughout the book, Ouspensky never refers to Gurdjieff directly, only using the single initial "G.", but it is common knowledge that this "G." was Gurdjieff, who taught Ouspensky an ancient esoteric system of self-development commonly known as the Fourth Way.

The book begins with Ouspensky returning home to St. Petersburg from his recent excursion to the East, where he journeyed "in search of the miraculous", as he put it. He soon meets a mysterious man, a certain "G.", who has all the answers for which Ouspensky has been arduously searching all his life. He immediately joins Gurdjieff's esoteric school, and begins learning a certain system of self-development which originated in the East, allegedly during the most remote antiquity, possibly millennia before recorded history.

Ouspensky recounts his trials learning this new system, which he later refers to as the Fourth Way, often recollecting entire lectures, or parts of lectures, which Gurdjieff gave to his disciples in St. Petersburg and Moscow from 1915–1917. He describes many of his experiences, particularly concerning the "art of self-remembering", and he recounts some of the methods and various exercises which comprised Gurdjieff's system.

The book concludes with his experiences during the Bolshevik Revolution and his and Gurdjieff's eventual escape to the West, where they continued to teach Gurdjieff's system to many followers until their respective deaths in 1947 and 1949. The latter part of the book also describes the author's feelings and motives behind his eventual decision to teach the system independently, not under the direct supervision of his teacher, Gurdjieff, which he formally announced to his students in London in early 1924.

== Publication ==
The book was published posthumously in 1949 by Ouspensky's students, two years after his death. Ouspensky originally titled the book simply Fragments of an Unknown Teaching, reflecting his view that Gurdjieff's system had to be "assembled" by the student himself, as well as his view that much of the original system was probably lost. It was also an oblique reference to a book by the well-known Theosophist and friend of Ouspensky, G.R.S. Mead called Fragments of a Faith Forgotten. Mead's book was a collection of fragments of an almost forgotten religion: Hermetism. Ouspensky recognized this as one of Gurdjieff's sources and used the title as an oblique reference. However, the publisher insisted on adding the prefix In Search of The Miraculous, which became the more commonly known shortened name for the book.

Originally published at the time of Gurdjieff's death and authorized by Gurdjieff himself, it is considered one of the best expositions of the structure of Gurdjieff's ideas and is often used as a means of teaching Gurdjieff's system, although Ouspensky himself never endorsed its use in such a broad manner. Nevertheless, this book is by far the most quoted by current disciples of Gurdjieff as they attempt to teach his system to new students, and Gurdjieff himself even had some of his students read parts of the book as part of their studies.

The 2001 edition has a foreword by writer Marianne Williamson, in which she notes the book's reputation as being a classic, or even a primer, in the teaching of esoteric principles and ideas. The 2004 facsimile edition of the first edition is identical in every way apart from a few modifications.

== Editions ==
- In Search of the Miraculous: The Definitive Exploration of G. I. Gurdjieff's Mystical Thought and Universal View, Harvest Book; New edition, 2001. ISBN 0-15-600746-0.

"In Search of the Miraculous - ISBN 978-1874250760 August 2010 - identical copy of first hardback edition. Paul H. Crompton Ltd.
