= Meetings with Remarkable Men (film) =

1979 film by Peter Brook

- VHS cover
- Directed by: Peter Brook
- Screenplay by: Peter Brook; Jeanne de Salzmann
- Based on: Meetings with Remarkable Men (book) by G. I. Gurdjieff
- Produced by: Stuart Lyons
- Starring: Dragan Maksimović; Terence Stamp
- Cinematography: Gilbert Taylor
- Edited by: John Jympson
- Music by: Laurence Rosenthal
- Distributed by: Enterprise Pictures Ltd
- Release date: 13 September 1979 (London)
- Running time: 89 minutes
- Country: United Kingdom
- Language: English

Meetings with Remarkable Men is a 1979 British biographical drama film directed by Peter Brook, from a screenplay by Brook and Jeanne de Salzmann. It is based on the autobiographical book by mystic G. I. Gurdjieff, first published in English in 1963. It stars Dragan Maksimović as Gurdjieff, along with an ensemble cast that features Terence Stamp, Warren Mitchell, Athol Fugard, Natasha Parry, and Colin Blakely, among others.

The film was entered into the 29th Berlin International Film Festival, in competition for the Golden Bear award.

== Plot ==
The plot involves Gurdjieff and his companions' search for truth in a series of dialogues and vignettes, much as in the book. Unlike the book, these result in a definite climax—Gurdjieff's initiation into the mysterious Sarmoung Brotherhood. The film is noteworthy for making public some glimpses of the Gurdjieff movements.

== Cast ==
- Dragan Maksimović as G. I. Gurdjieff
  - Mikica Dimitrijevic as young Gurdjieff
- Terence Stamp as Prince Yuri Lubovedsky
- Warren Mitchell as Ivan Ivanovich Gurdjieff
- Athol Fugard as Professor Skridlov
- David Markham as Dean Borsh
- Natasha Parry as Vitvitskaia
- Colin Blakely as Tamil
- Grégoire Aslan as Armenian Priest
- Tom Fleming as Father Giovanni
- Andrew Keir as Head of Sarmoung Monastery
- Donald Sumpter as Pogossian
- Gerry Sundquist as Karpenko
- Martin Benson as Dr. Ivanov
- Bruce Purchase as Father Maxim
- Roger Lloyd-Pack as Pavlov
- Constantine Gregory as Captain

== Production ==
The film was shot on location in Afghanistan, except for dance sequences, which were filmed in England.

== Reception ==
The Monthly Film Bulletin wrote: "The representation of spirituality in the cinema is not an insurmountable problem, but it demands either an intensified direction of actors (as in Dreyer) or a heroically rigorous organisation of visual material (as in Bresson), or both. In this, it cannot be said that Brook has succeeded. No doubt conditioned by the extent to which wise men, High Lamas and such have been subject to parody on the screen, the spectator rapidly tires of these cross-legged gurus with their invariably sweet-tempered if world-weary formulae on the nature of existence. English actors would seem to be chronically incapable of portraying other nationalties convincingly and when, as here, their greatest asset, voice, is carefully expunged of every trace of detectable accent, the resul can only be flat and, in the case of Terence Stamp, almost visibly ineffectual. As for the film's visual organisation, though not un impressive in its sweep, it comes perilously close to that, say, of Norman Jewison. Where Brook does succeed, however, is in conveying the young Gurdjieff's single-mindedness, which gradually becomes the dynamic of the film's narrative construction."

Variety wrote: "[Brook] has tried to give a visual reflection of mysticism, which is hard indeed. For here is a film that starts with a narrative flair but then tapers off to a more pedestrian level as the protagonist ends his search for teachers who can give him the balance of religion, science and insight into human nature he is seeking. Pic is based on the memoirs of George Gurdjieff who in the 20s formed a sort of sect or school where he tried to pass on his knowledge to people. But pic is mainly concerned with his quest. ... Brook still remains essentially a theatrical talent and here his use of ritual dancing, cursory plot angles and talk are rarely given a truly visual insight and dramatic pitch to keep film from falling into tedious stretches."
