= Gurdjieff Foundation =

Foundations and institutes inspired by G. I. Gurdjieff

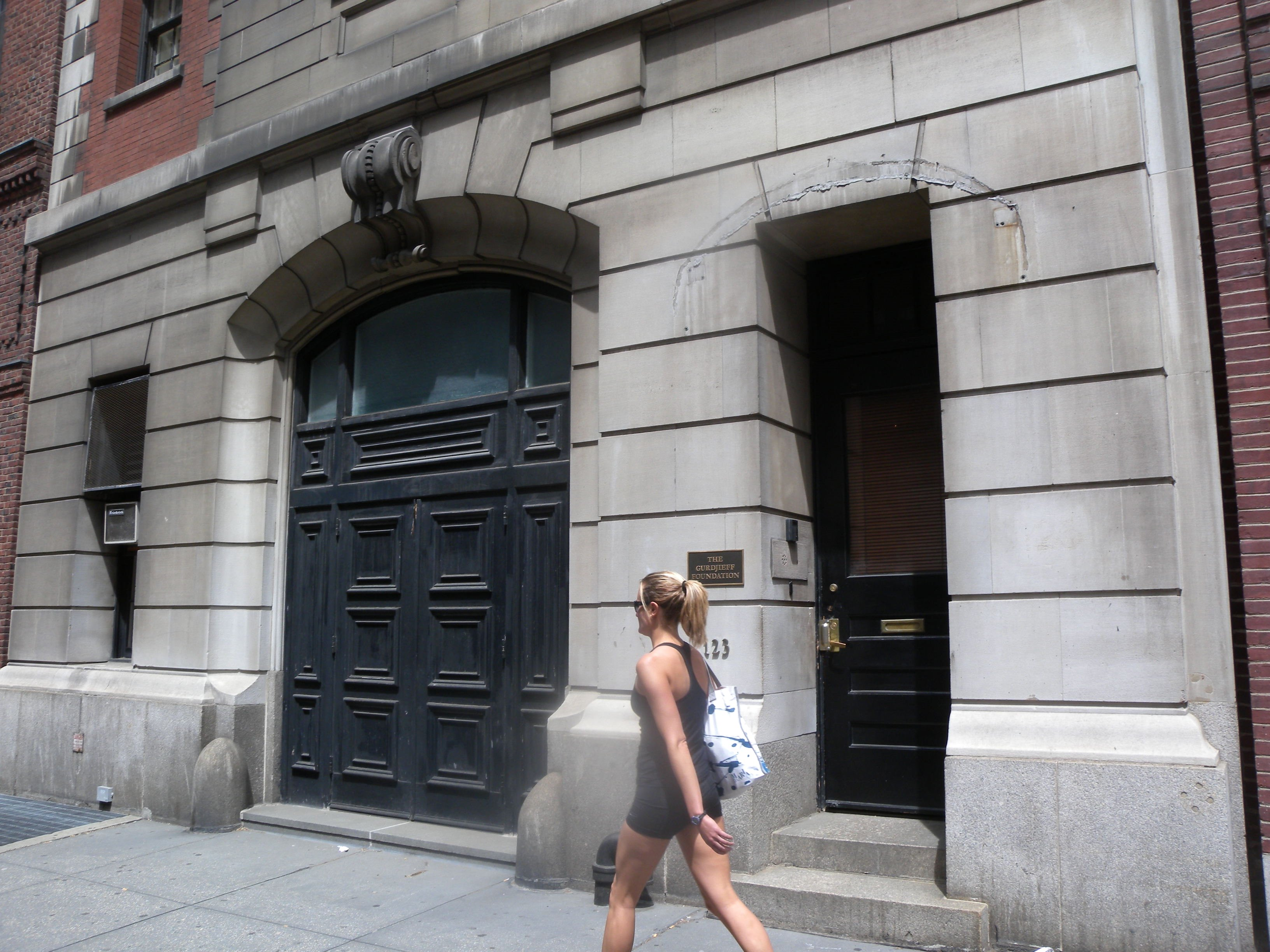
New York headquarters, in former C Ledyard Blair carriage house

G. I. Gurdjieff's teaching and practice inspired the formation of many groups organized as Foundations, Institutes, and Societies many of which are now connected by the International Association of the Gurdjieff Foundations (IAGF). After his death in 1949, the Gurdjieff Foundation Paris was organized and led by Jeanne de Salzmann from the early 1950s, in cooperation with other direct pupils, until her death in 1990; and until his death in 2001 by Michel de Salzmann.

The International Association of the Gurdjieff Foundations is an umbrella group for the four main organisations: The Gurdjieff Foundation in the USA, The Gurdjieff Society in the UK, the Institut Gurdjieff in France and GI Gurdjieff Foundation - Caracas in Venezuela. There is a network of partner foundations around the world, including in North, Central and South America as well as Europe.

The president of the Gurdjieff Foundation of New York was Henry John Sinclair, 2nd Baron Pentland, Lord Pentland from its formation until his death in 1984. It was then led by Dr. William J. Welch until his death in 1999, after which it was led jointly by Paul Reynard, a painter and teacher of Gurdjieff Movements, and Frank R. Sinclair, author of Without Benefit of Clergy and Of the Life Aligned, until Reynard's death in 2005. Frank R. Sinclair continued as president until 2011 and is currently president-emeritus.
