= Michel de Salzmann =

Swiss-French psychiatrist and director of the Gurdjieff Foundation (1923–2001)

Michel de Salzmann (31 December 1923 in Paris – 4 August 2001 in Paris), son of Jeanne de Salzmann, was a psychiatrist, and the president of the Gurdjieff Foundation from 1990 until his death. His friends and pupils salute him as one of the most important spiritual figures of the 20th century. His writings in English and in French reveal him as a creative thinker. Michel de Salzmann was a faithful follower of Gurdjieff, as seen in his contribution in The Encyclopedia of Religion (1987). A witness on his own teaching was given by the poet Fran Shaw.
