= Gurdjieff movements =

Dances collected by Gurdjieff

The Gurdjieff movements are a series of sacred dances that were created by G. I. Gurdjieff. He taught them to his pupils as part of his teaching to facilitate self observation and self study.

== Significance ==
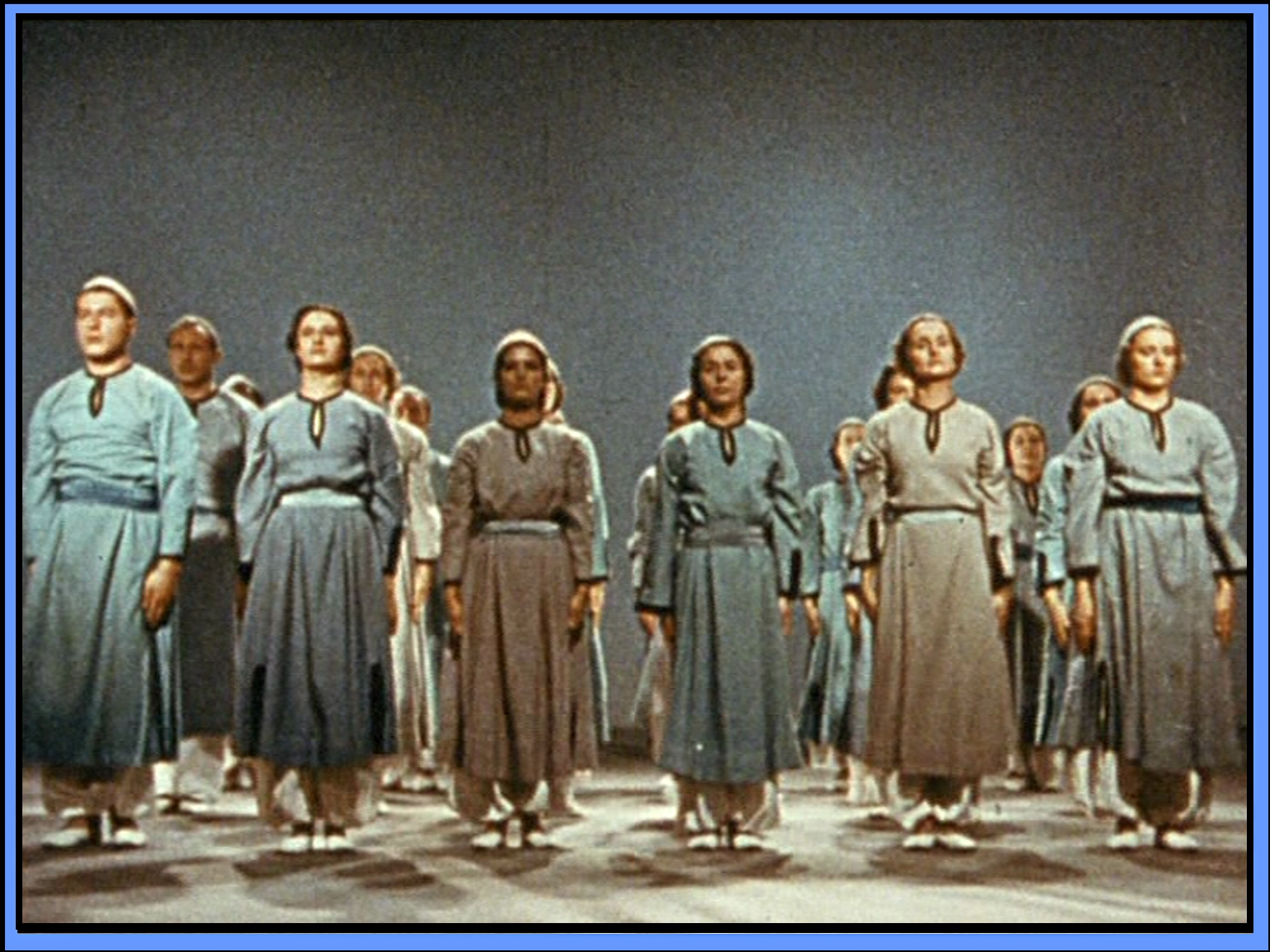
Gurdjieff Movements

The movements according to Gurdjieff express a knowledge that has been passed down though the generations to initiates in monasteries that he had visited during the course of his wanderings. Each posture and gesture helps the participant to think, feel and know themselves in a new way and to become more aware of themselves in movement.

== Origins ==
The movements are purportedly based upon traditional dances that Gurdjieff studied as he traveled throughout central Asia, India, Tibet, and Africa where he encountered various Indo-European and Sufi orders, Buddhist centers and other sources of traditional culture and learning. However, Gurdjieff insists that the main source, as well as the unique symbol of the Enneagram, was transmitted to him in the Sarmoung Monastery. Gurdjieff created and taught hundreds of different movements between 1918 to when he died in Paris in 1949, which were practiced and preserved for posterity by his students. The music for the movements was written by Gurdjieff and Thomas de Hartmann in the 1920s and are now practiced by various groups around the world who follow his teaching, and they have since been adopted and practiced by followers of other teachings, such as those presented by Osho, who described Gurdjieff as "one of the greatest spiritual masters of this era."

== In media ==
A brief glimpse of the dances appears at the very end of the motion picture about Gurdjieff, Meetings with Remarkable Men, produced and directed in 1978 by Peter Brook.
