= Groundhog Day (film) =

1993 American comedy film by Harold Ramis

- Theatrical release poster
- Directed by: Harold Ramis
- Screenplay by: Danny Rubin; Harold Ramis
- Story by: Danny Rubin
- Produced by: Trevor Albert; Harold Ramis
- Starring: Bill Murray; Andie MacDowell; Chris Elliott
- Cinematography: John Bailey
- Edited by: Pembroke J. Herring
- Music by: George Fenton
- Distributed by: Columbia Pictures
- Release dates: February 4, 1993 (Fox Village Theatre); February 12, 1993 (United States)
- Running time: 101 minutes
- Country: United States
- Language: English
- Budget: $14.6–30 million
- Box office: $105 million

Groundhog Day is a 1993 American fantasy romantic comedy film directed by Harold Ramis, who co-wrote the screenplay with Danny Rubin. Starring Bill Murray, Andie MacDowell, and Chris Elliott, it tells the story of a cynical television weatherman covering the annual Groundhog Day event in Punxsutawney, Pennsylvania, who becomes trapped in a time loop, forcing him to relive February 2 repeatedly. The film also features Stephen Tobolowsky, Brian Doyle-Murray, Marita Geraghty, Angela Paton, Rick Ducommun, Rick Overton, and Robin Duke in supporting roles.

Rubin conceived Groundhog Day in the early 1990s. He wrote it as a spec script to gain meetings with producers for other work. It eventually came to the attention of Ramis, who worked with Rubin to make his idea less dark in tone and more palatable to a general audience by enhancing the comedy. Murray clashed with Ramis over the script; he wanted to focus on the philosophical elements, whereas Ramis concentrated on the comedic aspects. Principal photography took place from March to June 1992, almost entirely in Woodstock, Illinois. Filming was difficult, in part because of bitterly cold weather but also because of the ongoing conflict between Ramis and Murray.

Groundhog Day premiered at the Fox Village Theatre on February 4, 1993 and was released by Columbia Pictures on February 12. Earning over $105 million, it became one of the year's highest-grossing films. It also received generally positive reviews. Critics praised the melding of sentimental and cynical moments, and the philosophical message beneath the comedy. It was nominated for multiple awards and won a BAFTA Award for Best Original Screenplay. The film marked the end of Murray and Ramis's longtime collaborative partnership, which had produced films like Caddyshack (1980) and Ghostbusters (1984). After filming ended, the pair did not speak to each other until shortly before Ramis's death in 2014. The film was a showcase for Murray; he had previously been seen primarily as a comic actor, and his performance led to more serious roles in critically acclaimed films.

In the years since its release, the film has grown in esteem; it is often considered among the greatest films of the 1990s and one of the greatest comedy films. It has also had a significant effect on popular culture: the term Groundhog Day, meaning a monotonous, unpleasant, and repetitive situation, has become part of the English lexicon. Buddhist, Christian, and Jewish scholars have analyzed the film as a religious allegory. Groundhog Day is also credited with having ushered in mainstream acceptance of comedy films with fantasy-genre elements, and popularizing time loop narratives. In 2006, the United States Library of Congress selected the film for preservation in the National Film Registry. Groundhog Day was adapted into a 2016 musical, and inspired a 2019 video game sequel, Groundhog Day: Like Father Like Son.

== Plot ==
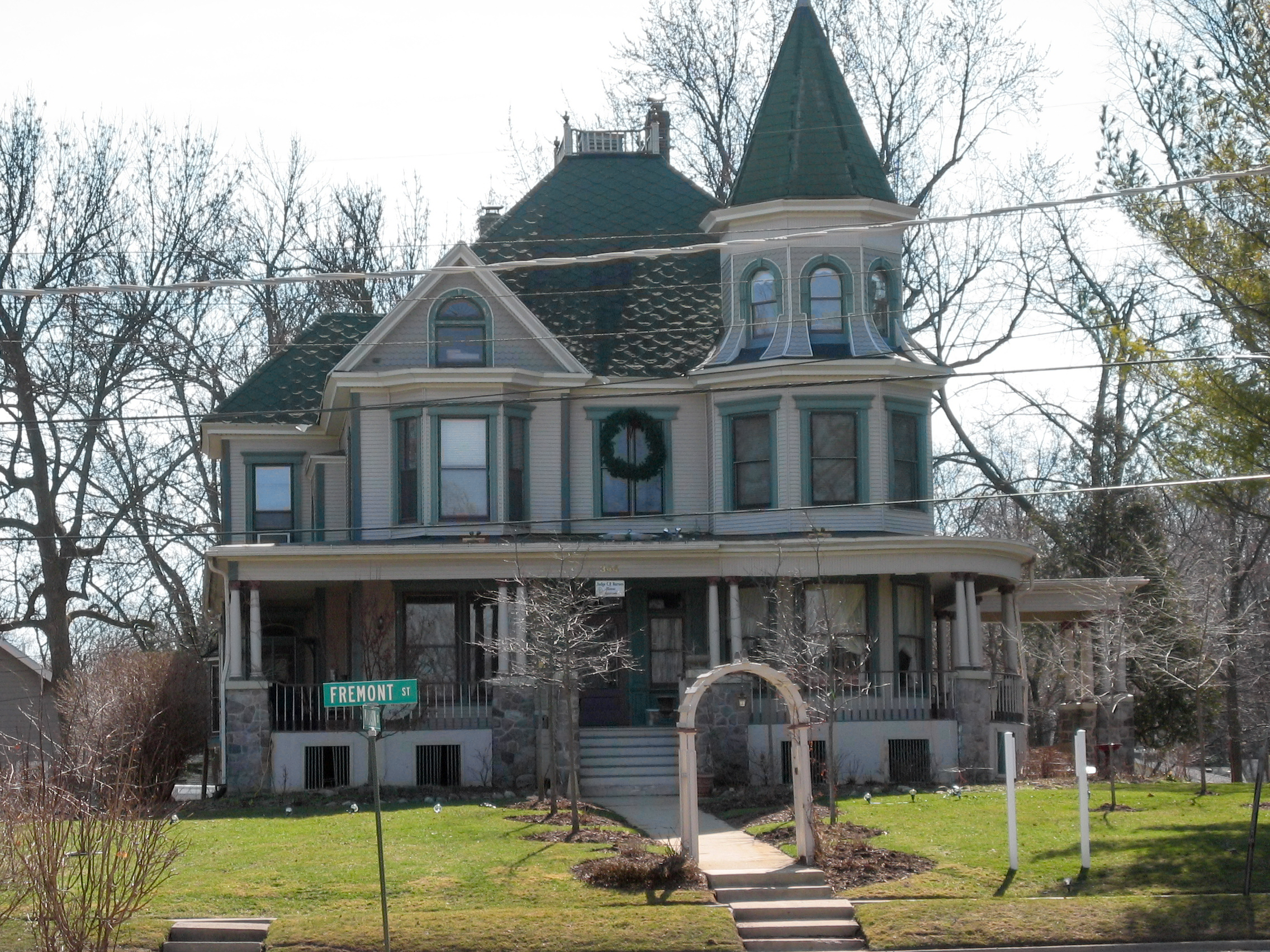
A private home in Woodstock, Illinois, was used for exteriors of the Cherry Street Inn, the fictional location in which Phil awakens every morning in the film.

On February 1, cynical television weatherman Phil Connors reassures his Pittsburgh viewers that an approaching blizzard will miss Western Pennsylvania. Alongside his new producer Rita Hanson and cameraman Larry, Phil travels to Punxsutawney for his annual coverage of the Groundhog Day festivities. He makes no secret of his contempt for the assignment, the small town, and the "hicks" who live there, asserting that he will soon leave his station for a new job.

On February 2, Phil awakens in the Cherry Street Inn to Sonny & Cher's "I Got You Babe" playing on the clock radio. He gives a half-hearted report on the groundhog Punxsutawney Phil and the festivities. Contrary to his prediction, the blizzard strikes the area, preventing all travel, and although he desperately searches for a way to leave, he is forced to spend the night in the town.

The next morning, Phil again awakens to "I Got You Babe" and the same DJ banter on the radio in his room at the Cherry Street Inn. He experiences the previous day's events repeating exactly and believes he is experiencing déjà vu. He again unsuccessfully attempts to leave the town and retires to bed, only to awaken on February 2 once more. Phil realizes that he is trapped in a time loop of which no one else is aware. He confides his situation to Rita, who directs him to a neurologist, who in turn directs him to a psychologist; neither can explain his experiences. He gets drunk with locals Gus and Ralph and then leads police on a high-speed car chase before being arrested and imprisoned; the next morning, Phil awakens in the Cherry Street Inn once again.

Realizing that there are no consequences for his actions, Phil begins to spend his loops indulging in binge eating, one-night stands, and robbery, using his growing knowledge of the day's events and the town's residents to manipulate circumstances to his advantage. He eventually focuses on seducing the sweet-natured Rita, using the loops to learn more about her and exploit that knowledge. No matter what steps he takes, Rita rebuffs his advances, particularly when Phil tells her he loves her; she asserts that he does not even know her.

Phil gradually becomes depressed and desperate for a way to escape the loop. He commits suicide in a variety of ways, including kidnapping Punxsutawney Phil and driving them both off a cliff. Each time, he reawakens on February 2. He tries to explain his situation to Rita again, using his detailed knowledge of the day to predict events accurately. Convinced, Rita spends the day with him and encourages him to view the loop as a blessing rather than a curse. As they lie on the bed together at night, Phil realizes that his feelings for Rita have become sincere. He wakes alone on February 2. He decides to use the loop to change himself and help others: he saves people from deadly accidents and misfortunes and learns to play the piano, sculpt ice, and speak French. Despite his efforts, however, he is haunted by his inability to prevent a homeless old man from dying of natural causes.

During one iteration of the loop, Phil reports on the Groundhog Day festivities with such eloquence that other news crews stop working to listen, amazing Rita. Phil continues his day helping the people of Punxsutawney. That night, Rita witnesses Phil's expert piano-playing as the adoring townsfolk regale her with stories of his good deeds. Impressed by his apparent overnight transformation, Rita successfully bids for him at a charity bachelor auction. Phil carves an ice sculpture in Rita's image and tells her that no matter what happens, even if he is trapped in the loop forever, he is finally happy because he loves her. They share a kiss and retire to his room.

Phil wakes the next morning to find Rita still in bed with him; it is now February 3. He tells Rita he wants to live in Punxsutawney with her.

== Cast ==
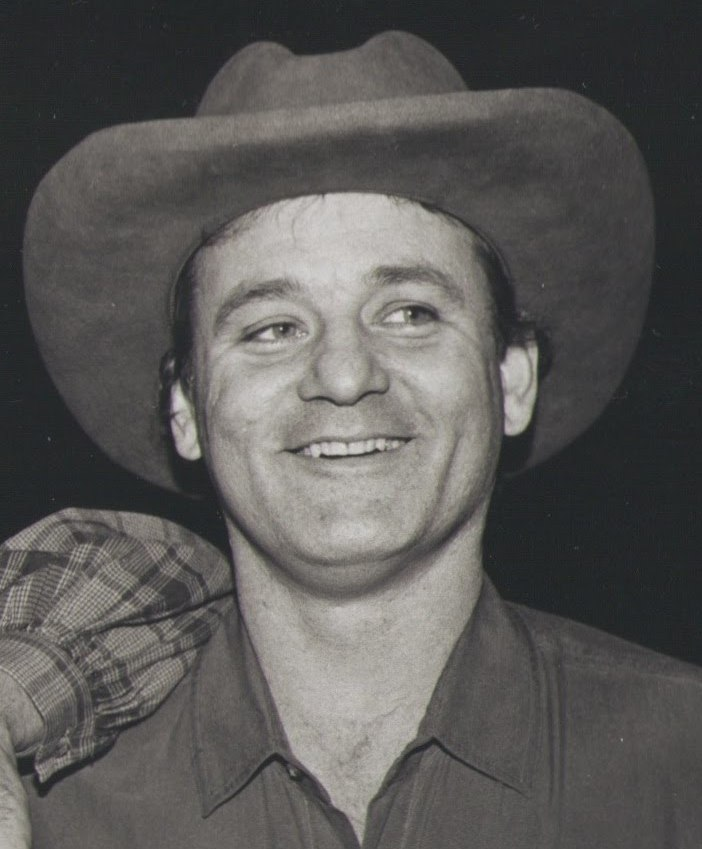
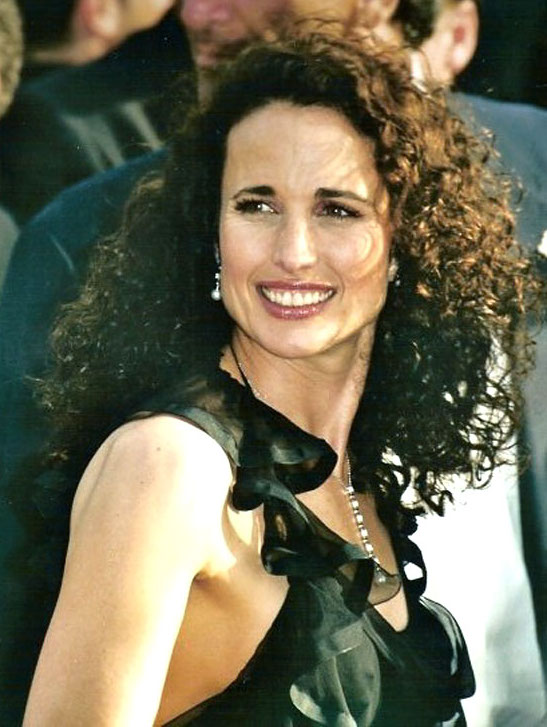
Bill Murray (left) in 1989, and Andie MacDowell in 2003
- Bill Murray as Phil Connors
- Andie MacDowell as Rita Hanson
- Chris Elliott as Larry the cameraman
- Stephen Tobolowsky as Ned Ryerson
- Brian Doyle-Murray as Buster Green
- Marita Geraghty as Nancy Taylor
- Angela Paton as Mrs. Lancaster
- Rick Ducommun as Gus
- Rick Overton as Ralph
- Robin Duke as Doris the waitress

In addition to the main cast, Groundhog Day features Ken Hudson Campbell as the man in the hotel hallway, David Pasquesi as Phil's psychiatrist, and Richard Henzel and Rob Riley as the radio hosts waking Phil every morning. Hynden Walch and Michael Shannon portray the newlywed couple Debbie and Fred. Les Podewell plays the homeless old man, and Rod Sell appears as a Groundhog Day official. Director Harold Ramis cameos as a neurologist. Punxsutawney Phil is portrayed by a groundhog known as Scooter.

== Production ==
=== Concept and original draft ===
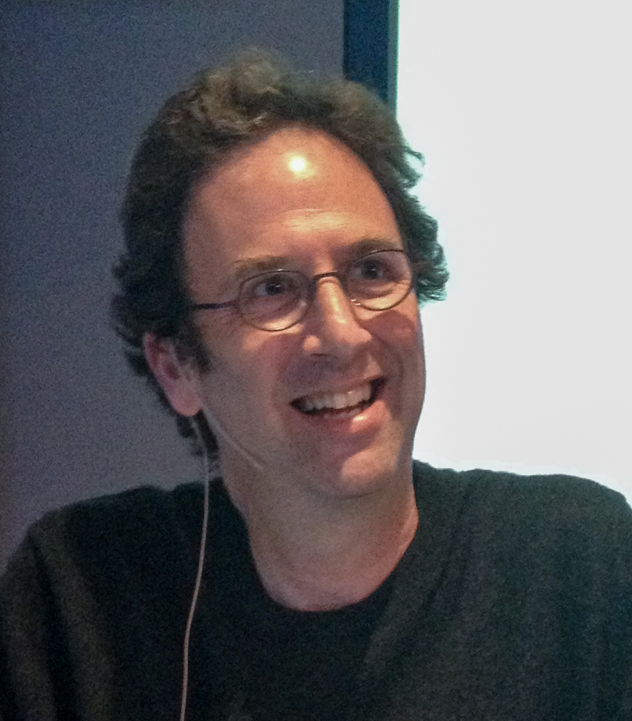
Screenwriter Danny Rubin in 2013

The original idea for Groundhog Day came to writer Danny Rubin in 1990. He had moved to Los Angeles to work as a screenwriter. While waiting in a theater for a film to start, he was reading Anne Rice's book The Vampire Lestat (1985). Rubin began musing about vampiric immortality and what one would do with their time if it was limitless. He reasoned that vampires were like normal people who did not need to adhere to ordinary rules or moral boundaries. He questioned if and when immortality would become boring or pointless, and how a person would change over time, especially if they were incapable of substantial change. He singled out men he deemed to be in arrested development, who could not outlive their adolescence.

Having recently sold his first script for what would become the thriller film Hear No Evil (1993), his agent prompted him to develop a "calling-card" script that he could use to gain meetings with producers. Rubin began work on his idea of a man changing over eternal life, but quickly realized that the idea was impractical because of the expense of depicting historical and future events. At this point, Rubin recalled a brief story concept he had written two years earlier that followed a man who woke every morning to find it was the same day repeating. Rubin married the two ideas to create the outline for Groundhog Day. By portraying eternity as a repeating cycle instead of a straight line through history, he eliminated the production cost of constantly changing settings. He believed that the repetition also offered him more dramatic and comedic possibilities.

Rubin opened a calendar and picked the next nearest holiday, February 2, Groundhog Day. He saw it as a date with story potential because it was a recognized holiday without much widespread attention. Rubin believed that people were vaguely aware of the holiday, on which a groundhog predicts the coming of spring. Even so, he believed few people outside Pennsylvania were aware that the actual festival takes place in the small town of Punxsutawney, something he became aware of through a writing job for a local phone company. Setting the story in Punxsutawney provided a small area in which to trap Phil Connors, while reporting on the event gave the character a reason to visit. Rubin took the main character's name from Punxsutawney Phil. He hoped the film could become a perennial holiday favorite, like It's a Wonderful Life (1946) and A Charlie Brown Christmas (1965).

Rubin spent eight weeks working on the story: seven making notes to define the rules and characters, and one writing the script. He struggled to establish a cause for the time loop, considering technological, magical, and celestial origins. He considered these methods interchangeable and felt the cause was unimportant and could detract from the story elements he wanted to focus on. Rubin said that the lack of explanation made Phil's situation more relatable, as "none of us knows exactly how we got stuck here either." He chose to begin the story in medias res, with Phil already caught in the time loop. The first scene included Phil waking to "I Got You Babe", predicting the radio host banter and the actions of the hotel patrons, and attacking a pedestrian outside. Rubin thought this would intrigue an audience trying to understand how and why he is doing these things. He chose "I Got You Babe" because it used a lot of repeating lines and was about love, which he felt were thematically resonant aspects. He likened his original script to the 1949 British black comedy film Kind Hearts and Coronets, particularly the flippant way in which Phil's multiple suicides are shown.

Rubin did not initially write the film as a broad comedy, considering it more whimsical. He found that the funnier elements were the easiest to think of; one of the earliest scenes he wrote was about Phil using his ever-increasing knowledge to seduce women. Loops were also dedicated to Phil seeing how far he could get outside of Punxsutawney; inevitably, he was always returned to the town. Even so, the script focused much more on Phil's loneliness. He breaks the loop only after realizing that there are other lonely people and that he can do good deeds to make them happier. Scenes in the finished film happened much earlier in Rubin's script, such as Phil driving over a cliff. The passage of time was also more distinct; Phil would track it by reading one page of a book per day, reaching his low point when he realizes he has run out of books. The original ending also featured a twist: Phil breaks his loop and then confesses his love to Rita. The perspective then becomes Rita's; she rejects Phil's advance because she is not ready for love and gets trapped in a loop of her own.

=== Development ===
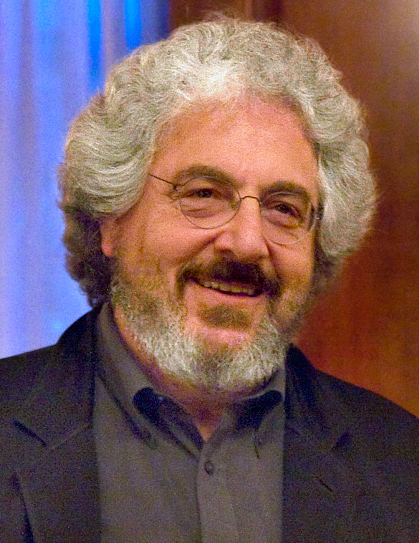
Director and writer Harold Ramis in 2009

Rubin's agent used the script to arrange meetings with producers; although it did not sell, the meetings generated other work for him. In 1991, after his agent left the industry, Rubin distributed the Groundhog Day script in an effort to secure a new representative. It came to the attention of Richard Lovett at Creative Arts Agency. Lovett said that he could not represent Rubin, but passed the script to his own client, Harold Ramis.

By the early 1990s, Ramis had begun moving away from involvement in the anti-establishment and anti-institutional comedies, such as Caddyshack (1980) and National Lampoon's Vacation (1983), that had defined his earlier career. While Ramis had successes in front of the camera and in creative roles like writing, his last directorial effort, Club Paradise (1986), had been a critical and commercial failure. He wanted to direct an unusual project and was particularly interested in comedies about redemption and discovering one's purpose in life. Rubin was aware of Ramis's previous work, having watched him in film and television.

Ramis admitted that he did not laugh while reading Rubin's script. He was interested in the underlying spirituality and romance present, but thought it needed more humor. The pair discussed the core ideas in the script, raising parallels between it and the concepts of Buddhism and reincarnation. They also discussed whether it was ethical for Superman—a superhuman being with the power to save the lives of countless people and prevent disasters—to effectively waste time on adventures with his partner Lois Lane.

Rubin's script became the subject of two offers: one arranged by Ramis through Columbia Pictures that would grant his project a higher budget, but at the cost of creative control, and a smaller independent studio that offered a lower budget of $3 million, but would let Rubin retain his original concept. Rubin chose to go with Ramis's deal. As expected, the studio wanted changes.

=== Writing ===
Rubin admitted to becoming defensive about the studio's changes. He was concerned that they would remove what he saw as innovative plot points and turn it into a generic comedy film. Ramis supervised the rewrite, tasked with balancing Rubin's desire for originality and the studio's demand for a broad comedy. The pair loosely used the Kübler-Ross model of the five stages of grief—denial, anger, bargaining, depression, and acceptance—as an outline. Ramis imagined himself in Phil's situation and the things he would do and feel if in the same cycle of entrapment. The pair spent weeks revising the script. Ramis suggested that Rubin's original ending, with Rita trapped in her own loop, be removed. He felt that audiences would dislike this as it offered no catharsis. Similarly, he felt it was important to retain the story's darker elements, such as Phil's suicides, as these compensated for the necessary sentimental moments.

Rubin delivered a fresh draft on February 2, 1991. He was contractually permitted to write another draft, but the studio had Ramis take over, bringing Rubin's involvement to an end. Ramis took Rubin's new draft and began his solo rewrite. He found the sentimentality and sincerity completely opposed to everything he had learned to do as a comedian, and deliberately tempered the sweeter moments with a cynical and grouchy tone. Ramis reorganized the script into a mainstream three-act narrative. He emphasized Phil's smug attitude as a means of distancing himself from others, giving him a defined story arc as a classic comedic lead character deserving of his punishment. Ramis liked Rubin's concept of starting with the loop in progress, but associate producer Whitney White suggested starting the film before the loop begins because she thought it would be more interesting for the audience to see Phil's initial reaction to his predicament.

Ramis also removed Rita's boyfriend, Max, and introduced (then removed) Phil's executive producer, Gil Hawley. This draft featured more scenes focused on Phil's sexual conquests and removed some content deemed more mean-spirited, like Phil asking Rita to be his "love slave". The situation was reversed in the final version of the film, in which Rita buys Phil at the bachelor auction, claiming that she owns him. Phil's journeys outside Punxsutawney were excised, as Ramis did not want the audience becoming too focused on what the rules of the loop were and felt that keeping the story within the town made it more claustrophobic. Phil's expositional narration was removed as well. Also excised were more scenes of Phil's later good deeds and the clever methods he used to prevent accidents while making the most efficient use of his time. For example, Phil puts a large rock in a road to stop a truck delivering fish, on which a restaurant patron would have later choked. Where Rubin's original script had been more sermonic and deprecating, Ramis made the tone more optimistic. Two versions of a scene with Phil and Rita in a diner from Rubin's original script and Ramis's rewrite exemplify the shift of emphasis toward both Phil's smugness and the romantic core of the film:

Rubin's original script
PHIL (voice over) "And me and Rita—together—was the most obvious thing in the world..."
PHIL "Have you ever felt like you were reliving the same day over and over again?"
RITA "Like déjà vu?"
PHIL "More like—déjà, déjà, déjà, déjà..."
RITA "So, you still think you've been here before?" Phil nods.
RITA "And how does this evening turn out?"
PHIL "I'll tell you what I do know. Even in a day as long as this, even in a lifetime of endless repetition, there's still room for possibilities."

Ramis's rewrite
PHIL "What are you looking for? Who's your perfect guy?"
RITA "Well. First of all, he's too humble to know he's perfect."
PHIL "That's me."
RITA "He's intelligent, supportive, funny."
PHIL "Intelligent, supportive, funny. Me, me, me."
RITA (thinking) "He's romantic and courageous."
PHIL "Me, me also."
RITA "He has a good body but he doesn't have to look in the mirror every two minutes."
PHIL "I have a great body and I never look at it."
RITA "He's kind and sensitive and gentle and considerate. And he's not afraid to cry in front of me."
PHIL "This is a man we're talking about, right?"

It was Ramis's version that attracted Bill Murray to the project, though Murray and Ramis immediately clashed over its tone. Murray wanted to focus on the philosophical elements; Ramis countered that it was meant to be a comedy. The studio was happier with Ramis's draft, believing that his changes made it more appealing to audiences. Columbia Pictures rehired Rubin to assess the script and provide notes. Rubin returned the script with pages of honest and sometimes sarcastic notes. In response, Murray recommended fully rehiring Rubin to assist on the script.

The studio refused to greenlight the project without making explicit why Phil becomes trapped. Producer Trevor Albert described a Columbia executive saying, "Why does the day repeat?... I like it... but I don't understand why he gets stuck in this loop." Rubin had conceived of several causes for the loop, including a jilted lover placing a curse on Phil and a mad scientist's invention malfunctioning. Albert and Ramis worked with Rubin to appease the studio, while agreeing to place the scenes too late in the shooting schedule to be filmed—and if forced to shoot it, to simply not include it in the film.

As the conflict between Ramis and Murray continued, Ramis sent Rubin to work on the script with Murray; he believed it was the only way to stop Murray's constant early-morning phone calls. When Ramis called to check on their progress, Murray asked Rubin to pretend he was not there. The pair visited the 1992 Punxsutawney Groundhog Day festival to get a better understanding of the event, remaining discreet and not revealing the reason for their visit. They then spent weeks working together in New York City revising the script. Rubin found Murray's more laid-back approach to writing "frustrating." They were still working on the script a month before filming began, bringing it back closer to Rubin's original.

Rubin and Ramis then collaborated on an additional rewrite. The pair worked on individual sections and then edited each other. Ramis then spent a few days refining it into the screenplay. Rubin recommended that they not include any references to the 1990s or any specific period to allow it to remain timeless. Rubin has said that the final film largely resembles his script. He did regret the loss of a scene between Phil and a 14-year-old boy, in which the child behaves like Phil did at the start of the film, contrasting with Phil's character development by that point in the script. A few scenes were written but not filmed, including Phil praying at a church, gambling, and a scene Murray personally vetoed, of Phil stripped naked to force an elderly man out of a swimming pool. Although the script was complete, it continued to undergo changes during filming.

=== Casting ===
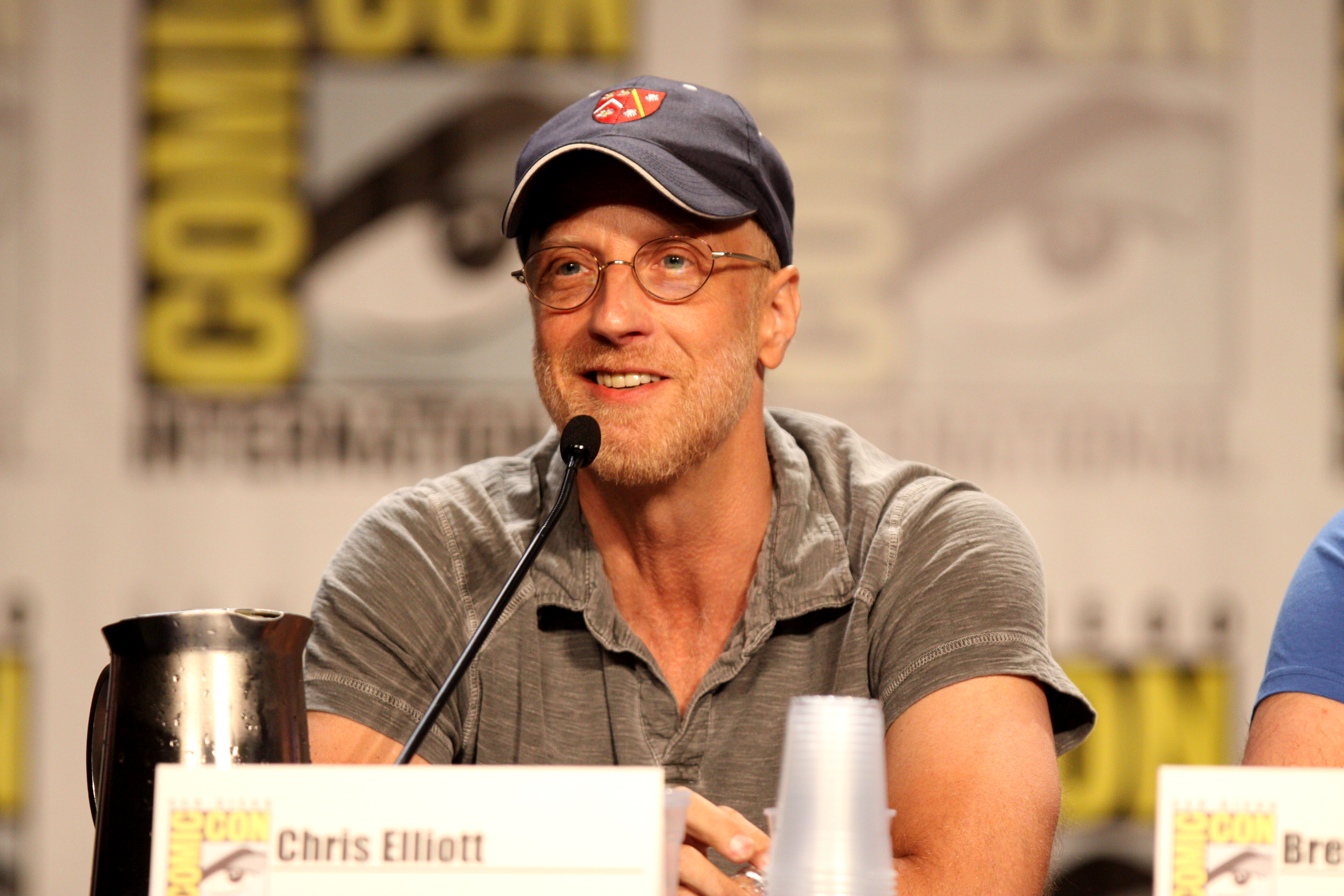
Chris Elliott (pictured in 2011) portrays Larry the cameraman.

For the role of Phil Connors, Chevy Chase, Tom Hanks, and Michael Keaton were also considered. Hanks was Ramis's first choice, but he rejected the offer, rationalizing that he was typecast portraying nice people, and the audience would be expecting his inevitable redemption, whereas Murray was "such a miserable [son of a bitch] on- and off-screen" that the outcome would be less predictable. Keaton said that the role of a "wry, sardonic, glib" character was a typical role for him, but that he simply did not understand the film. He later confessed regret in passing on the role. Phil was written as a younger man, but this was changed when it was determined that the appropriate comic actors were all older.

Murray and Ramis had a longstanding friendship and collaborative relationship, having worked together since 1974 on many projects and five films to great success, including Meatballs (1979), Caddyshack, and Ghostbusters (1984). Rubin did not write the character as particularly nasty, aiming for a normal person in an extranormal situation. In casting Murray, Phil was portrayed as more cynical, sarcastic, and detached, but not so malicious that audiences would no longer support him. Rubin wanted Kevin Kline for the part, believing Murray did not have the necessary acting ability. Ramis reassured Rubin, saying, "Don't worry. This is what Bill Murray can do. He can be that nasty and still make you like him." MacDowell agreed, saying, "He's a jerk but he makes you laugh."

Albert auditioned comedians for the role of Rita, but determined that someone competing with Murray at comedy would be detrimental. Rita was not intended to trade witty comments with Phil, but instead to offer human warmth and intelligence. MacDowell was cast because she was thought to bring an effortless grace suited to Rita's character. MacDowell tried to adapt to Murray's natural improvisation in scenes. She believed that her character's humor comes from her honesty, without being outlandish. Singer Tori Amos was also considered for the role.

Tobolowsky was hired after delivering an "overwhelmingly obnoxious" portrayal during his audition. Kurt Fuller had previously been cast in the role and was unaware that auditions were being held to replace him. Michael Shannon, who portrays prospective groom Fred, made his on-screen acting debut in the film. He spent much of the shoot in the background of the diner scene as they wanted all the actors in their places even if the camera was not focused on them. A live groundhog, given the name Scooter, was used to portray Punxsutawney Phil. Punxsutawney officials, upset that their town was not used for filming, refused to allow the real Punxsutawney Phil to appear in the film. The groundhog itself was not specially bred for use on film and was trapped in the wild near Illinois a few weeks before filming.

=== Preproduction ===
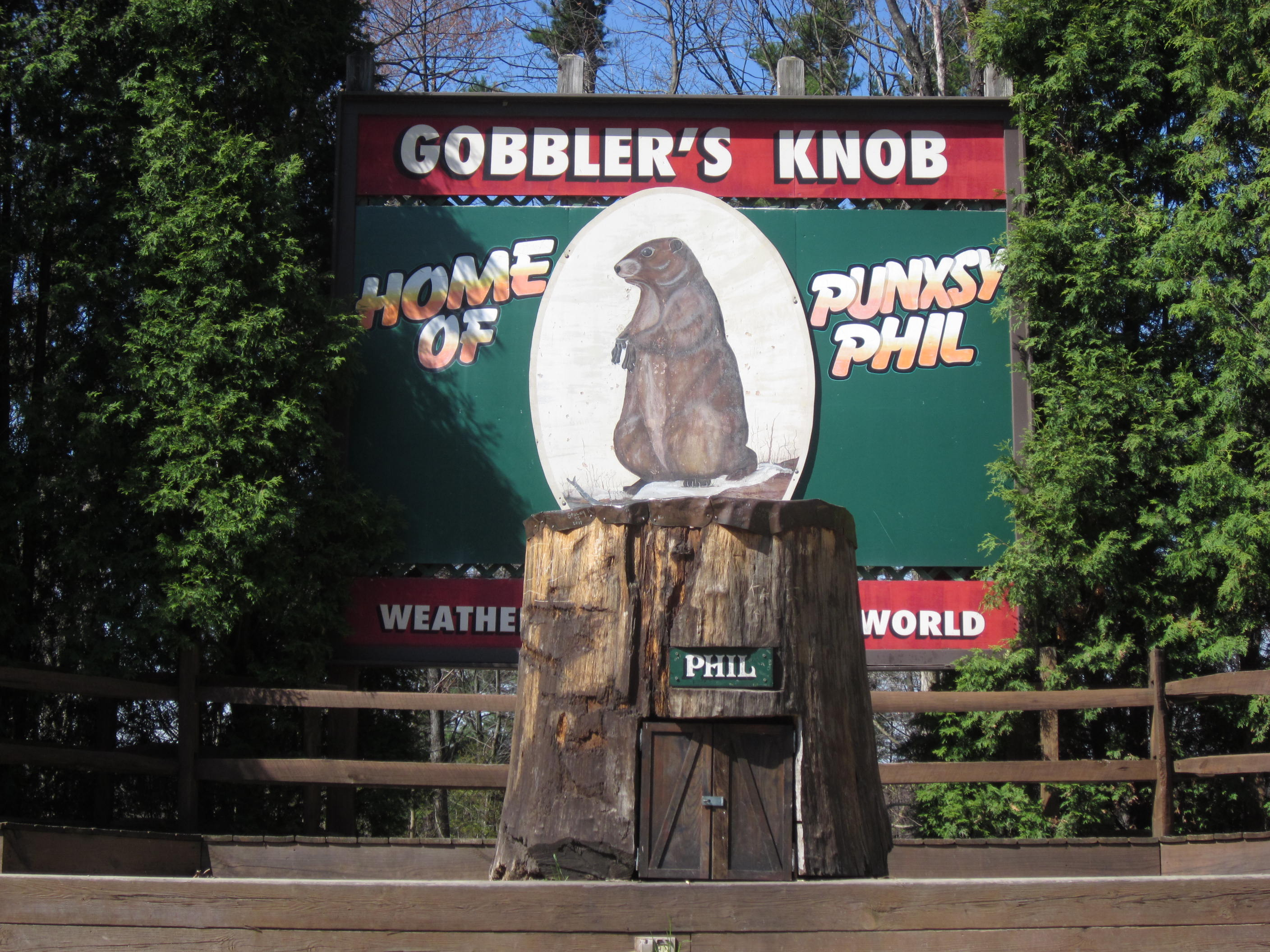
The real Gobbler's Knob in Punxsutawney, Pennsylvania (2012)

The production wanted to use a "quintessential American town" for location shooting, a place that did not look as if it was specific to any particular period. The Pennsylvania Film Commission provided location scouting tapes of Punxsutawney, but it became obvious that attempting to film in Punxsutawney would present difficulties, as the town had few ideal filming locations for the scripted scenes. Punxsutawney was also too isolated from the necessary amenities. The rural town was nearly 80 miles (130 km) from Pittsburgh, the nearest large city, and did not offer sufficient accommodation for the entire cast and crew.

As a Chicago native, Ramis enjoyed filming in Illinois and knew the area could meet their needs. These included being closer to a major metropolitan area with access to highways, a winter aesthetic, and the ability to complete the production as quickly as possible. Ramis also wanted a main street like Punxsutawney's. Location scout Bob Hudgins thought that Mineral Point, Wisconsin, could meet their requirements. During the scouting journey there, the team stopped in the city of Baraboo, Wisconsin, which happened to have a town square. The filmmakers could see the benefits of a town square over a main street. Ramis asked for something similar, but in closer proximity to Chicago.

By the time they arrived in Woodstock, Illinois, over 60 towns had been scouted. Hudgins was aware of the town of Woodstock from his work on the 1987 comedy film Planes, Trains and Automobiles. Though relatively remote, it offered the timeless quality the filmmakers sought. After Hudgins arranged for Ramis and Albert to view the town from the bell tower of the Woodstock Opera House, the decision was made to film in Woodstock. Woodstock also had a large pothole, which Phil stepped in.

Scouts initially found a forested preserve area outside of McHenry, Illinois, to film scenes at Gobbler's Knob. The filmmakers later opted to position the site in the town square instead, recreating it to scale with detailed notes and videos, which significantly increased the effect on the town. Thousands of extras were on site across multiple takes. Several local businesses banded together to oppose the film's presence, concerned about the influence the production would have on both the town square and storefronts over an indeterminate amount of time. Hudgins said that he was proud that badges with the number "23" on them—representing the 23 united businesses—had to be amended to "14" as he won several over. The city council was also split on whether to let it proceed. Three of the business owners sued Columbia Pictures after filming concluded for lost profits during the production. One of these cases was settled out of court; the outcomes of the other two are unknown.

=== Filming ===
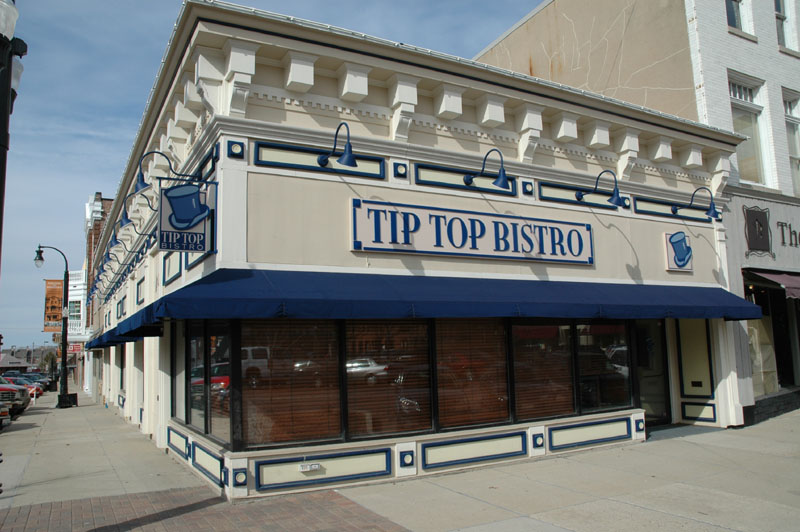
Tip Top Bistro, established at the site of the fictional Tip Top Cafe in Woodstock

Principal photography began on March 16, 1992, and concluded on June 10, after 86 days. The budget was reported to be between $14.6 million and $30 million. Filming took place mainly in Woodstock, as well as on sets in Cary, Illinois, and Hollywood.

Weather conditions varied considerably during filming. Much of the shoot was conducted in conditions described as frigid and bitterly cold. Murray estimated that it was often 20 °F (−7 °C). The conditions persisted until the end of May. Murray said that being outside for up to 12 hours a day left his skin feeling raw and made him irritable. Toward the end of the shoot, as summer began, fake snow was used to replicate the winter setting, and the actors continued to wear their winter gear despite the rising heat. Ramis could not decide on the weather conditions for the background of Phil's and Ned's encounters, so he shot their nine scenes multiple times in differing conditions. He settled on a gloomy setting to indicate a loop coming to an end. Weather conditions were a major factor in a two-week shoot for the car crash scene.

The shoot was also mired in tensions between Ramis and Murray; Ramis was focused on making a romantic comedy, in direct contrast to Murray's desire for a more contemplative film. Murray was also in the middle of a divorce from Margaret Kelly. He was reportedly miserable throughout filming, demonstrated erratic behavior, threw tantrums, and often contradicted Ramis's decisions. Ramis said that Murray constantly showed up late to set, calling his behavior "just irrationally mean and unavailable." The two also disagreed about the script and other actors' performances. Shannon recounted how he believed he had upset Murray during an encounter. When Ramis heard about this, he made Murray publicly apologize to Shannon. Tobolowsky recounted how before their scene's first take, Murray walked into a bakery and bought all the pastries, which he threw to the gathered onlookers, using Tobolowsky to help carry the load.

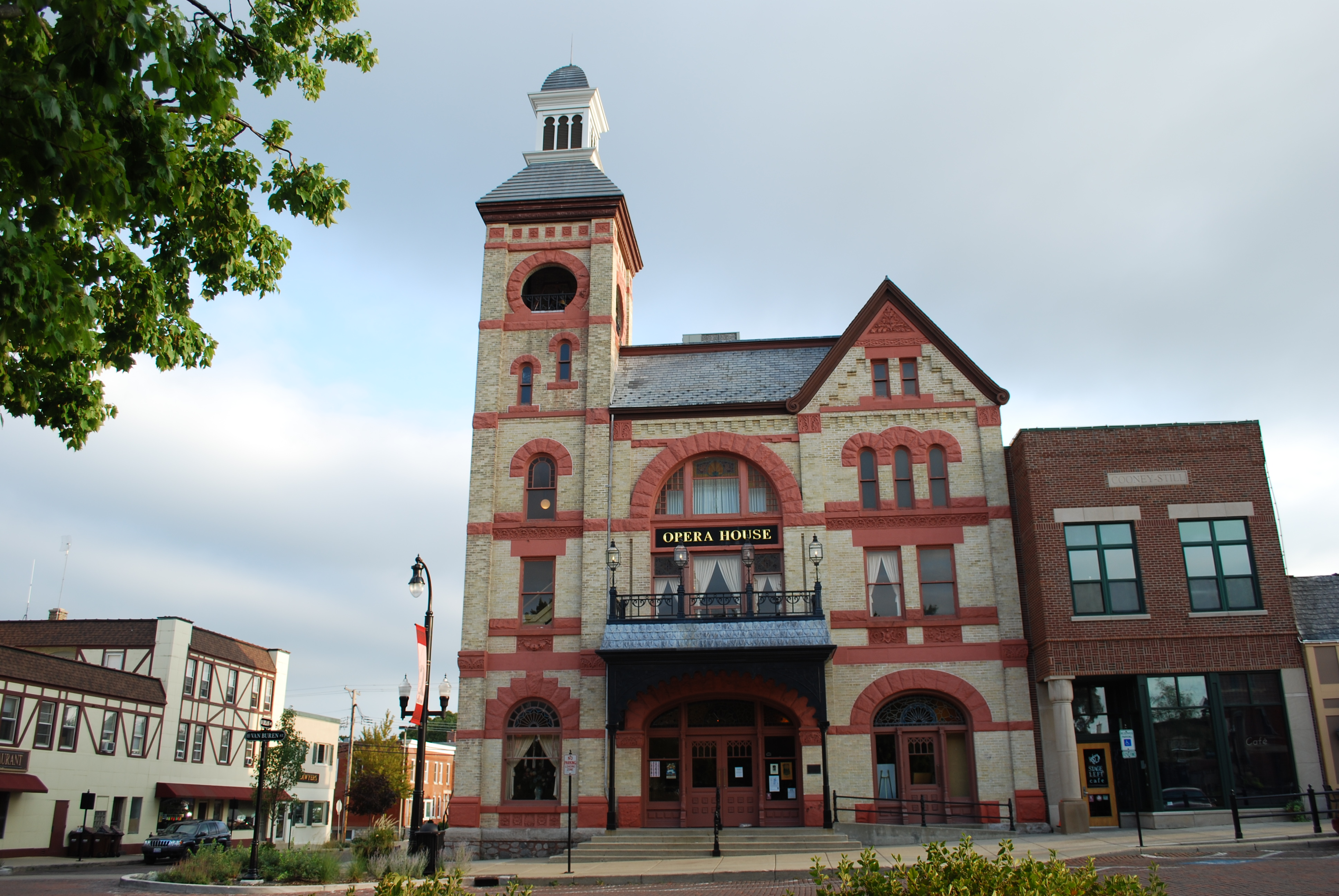
The Woodstock Opera House served as both the exterior of Rita's hotel and the scene of one of Phil's suicides.

The script continued to change during filming. When Tobolowsky arrived for his first scene, he was handed a new script. He estimated that about a third of it was different from his original copy. For example, early in the film, Phil ends his first loop by breaking a pencil to see if it is repaired the following day. A more elaborate scene was filmed in which Phil spray-painted the walls of the room he wakes up in, destroyed objects, and gave himself a Mohawk hairstyle. The scene took three days to film and was costly; Ramis discarded it for something quieter, simpler, and less manic. The revised script also featured more of Phil's misadventures, and his suicide attempts were set closer to the end. These scenes were moved forward in favor of a long third act showing Phil embracing life.

Murray endured physical discomfort for some scenes. To prepare for his step into the water-filled pothole, he wrapped his foot in cling wrap, neoprene, and two pairs of socks. As soon as the scene finished, he began an expletive-filled rant until the costume department dried his foot with hairdryers to avoid frostbite. For another scene, Murray asked MacDowell to really slap him, and Ramis instructed the children Murray confronts in a snowball fight to throw hard. During the scene in which Phil drives off with Punxsutawney Phil, the groundhog bit Murray on the knuckle. Although Murray was wearing gloves, the bite broke the skin. During a later take, the groundhog bit him again, in the same spot.

Murray was hesitant about shooting the final scene in which Phil awakens next to Rita, as how or whether Phil was dressed would affect the tone of the revelation that he had escaped the time loop. Ramis polled the crew, who were split between Phil wearing the same clothes as the previous night and different clothes that suggested the pair had been intimate. A young female crew member served as the tiebreaker, ruling that they should be wearing the same clothes as "anything else... will ruin the movie." As MacDowell's and Murray's characters venture outside the Cherry Street Inn in the film's denouement, the scripted line "Let's live here" is tempered by a Murray ad lib, "We'll rent to start."

Many locations in and around Woodstock were used in the production. The Woodstock Town Square features prominently. A bar in the former courthouse is used for a bar in Rita's hotel. The Woodstock Opera House served as the exteriors of Rita's hotel, and its tower is used for Phil's suicide leap. The Cherry Street Inn was a private residence; the interior was shot on a set. Woodstock City Lanes was used for the bowling alley scene. The Tip Top Cafe, a setting for several scenes, was purpose-built for the film. Local demand later led to a real diner with a near-identical name at the same location. The bachelor auction where Phil demonstrates his personal transformation was filmed at the Woodstock Moose Lodge. The shots of Murray being nearly run over by a train were filmed at the nearby Illinois Railway Museum. The scene of Phil driving a truck over a cliff was shot in Nimtz Quarry in Loves Park, Illinois, about 34 miles (55 km) from Woodstock. A rail system was used to propel two vehicles into the quarry on separate takes, to give Ramis a choice of shots; pyrotechnics were employed to make each explode.

== Release ==
=== Context ===
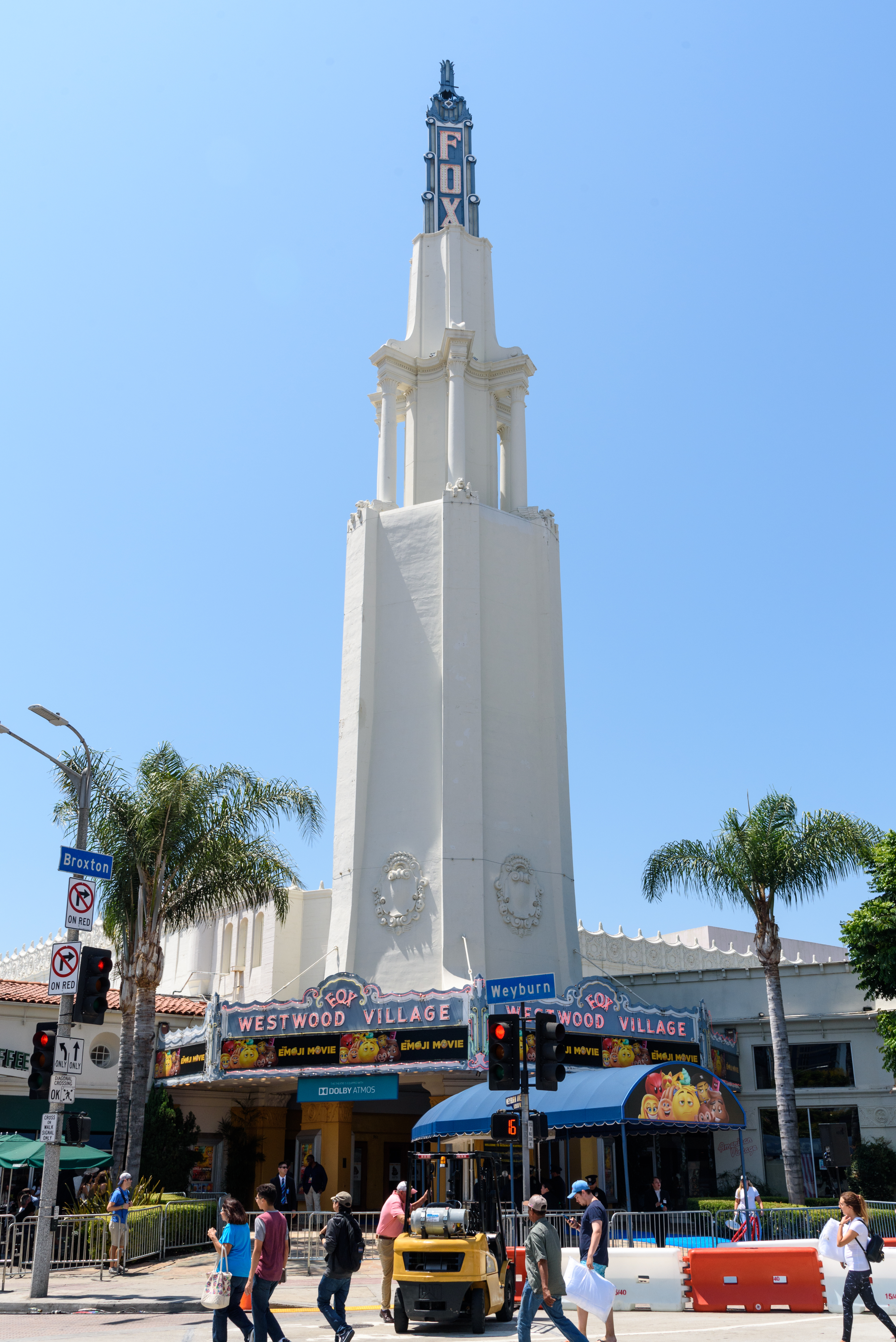
The premiere of Groundhog Day took place on February 4, 1993, at the Fox Theater, Westwood Village in Westwood, Los Angeles.

1993 was considered the year of the family film. This was seen as a response to criticism of Hollywood for overusing violence and sex in films, as well as a need for feel-good entertainment in a time of recession. As production costs rose, films pitched at both adults and children offered a greater chance being profitable both at the theater and in the ensuing home video rentals. By 1993, the three all-time highest-grossing films in North America were family-oriented: E.T. the Extra-Terrestrial, Star Wars, and Home Alone. Family films encouraged repeat business and offered more opportunities to sell merchandise. Columbia Pictures chairman Mark Canton said that PG-rated films were much more likely to make over $100 million, compared to adult-oriented fare. Groundhog Day was rated PG, allowing children access with parental permission. The film was seen as a potential sleeper success.

Groundhog Day was one of many family films released that year, including Free Willy, Last Action Hero, and the highly anticipated Jurassic Park, which would go on to become the highest-grossing film to date. Not all releases that year were family-centric; it would become considered one of the greatest years for film across a range of genres. There were blockbusters like Mrs. Doubtfire and Indecent Proposal, critical favorites such as Schindler's List and Philadelphia, and future classics, like Dazed and Confused, Batman: Mask of the Phantasm, and The Nightmare Before Christmas.

The premiere of Groundhog Day took place on February 4, 1993, at the Fox Theater in Westwood, Los Angeles. Murray did not attend the low-budget event, whose guests included comedian Rodney Dangerfield and actresses Catherine O'Hara, Mimi Rogers, and Virginia Madsen. $40,000 of the entry ticket sales profits were donated to the Scleroderma Research Foundation and Turning Point Shelter. A second premiere took place the following day in Crystal Lake, Illinois, followed by an auction of props and signed equipment from the film. All proceeds were donated to the Woodstock school district.

=== Box office ===
In North America, Groundhog Day received a wide release on February 12, 1993, across 1,640 theaters. The film earned $12.5 million—an average of $7,632 per theater. The film benefited from a four-day weekend due to the President's Day holiday Monday. This increased its weekend total to $14.6 million—enhancing the theater average to $8,934. This made it the second-biggest opening for a film released in winter, behind Wayne's World ($18 million) released the year before. Groundhog Day finished as the number one film of the weekend, ahead of romantic drama Sommersby ($9.9 million), and adventure comedy Homeward Bound: The Incredible Journey ($8.1 million), both in their second week of release. Screenings of the film were approximately 80% sold out. 65% of audiences polled said they would "definitely recommend" it.

The film retained the number-one position in its second weekend with a further gross of $9.3 million. In its third weekend, it dropped to second place with $7.6 million, behind the debuting crime thriller Falling Down ($8.7 million). Groundhog Day remained in the top 10 grossing films for a further four weeks, earning a total of $57.6 million. It spent the remainder of its run outside the top 10 apart from two brief resurgences—one during the long Easter weekend in mid-April where it rose to number 2, and approximately 15 weeks into its run, where it rose to number 7 after being released in low-price ticket theaters.

In total, the film earned an approximate box office gross of $70.9 million. Though it did not break any records, the film was considered a success, if a modest one. It finished as the 10th highest-grossing film of 1993 behind Free Willy ($78 million) and Cliffhanger ($84 million). When accounting for films released at the end of 1993 that earned most of their box office in 1994, Groundhog Day becomes the 14th highest-grossing film of 1993. Industry experts suggest that as of 1997, the box office returns to the studio—minus the theaters' share—was $32.5 million. Outside of North America, the film is estimated to have earned a further $34.2 million, giving it a cumulative worldwide gross of $105 million and making it the 19th highest-grossing film of the year worldwide.

== Reception ==
=== Critical reception ===
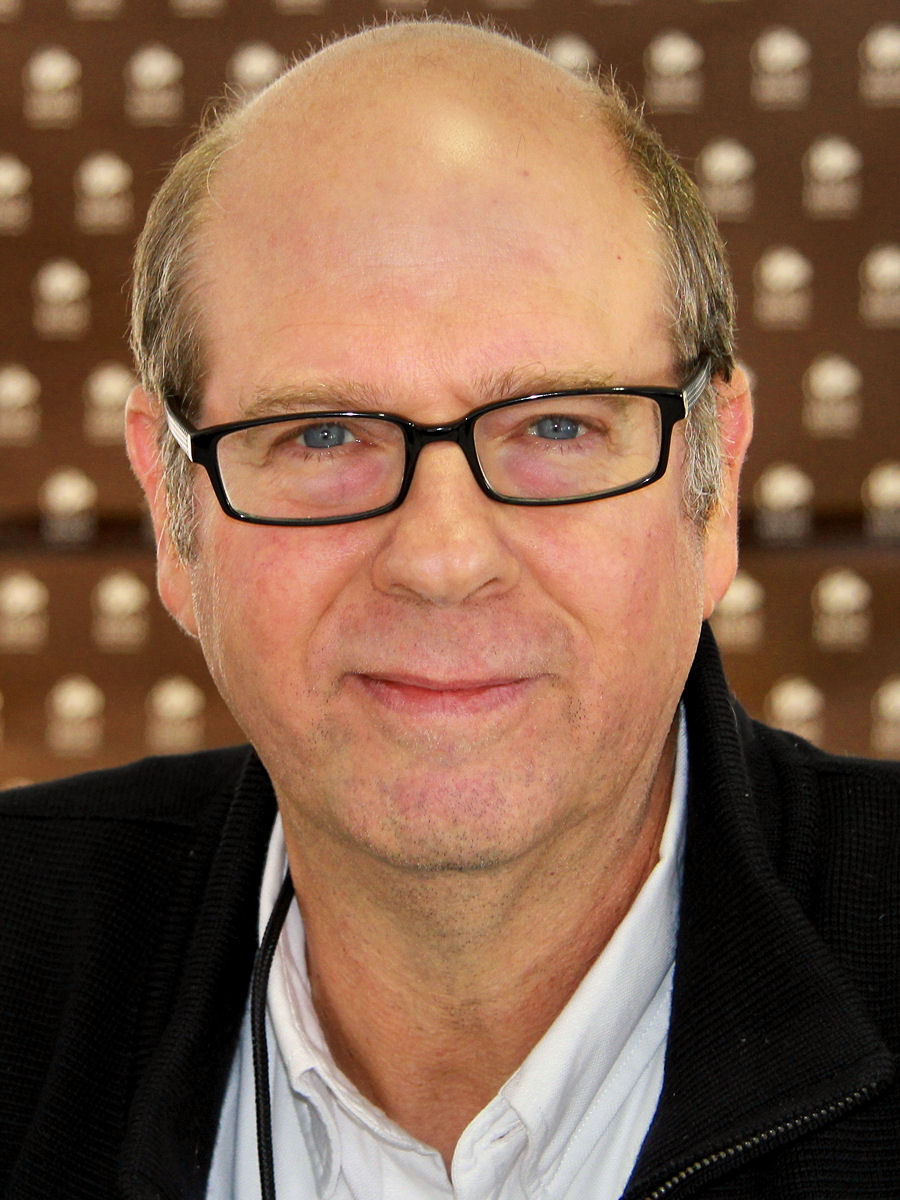
Stephen Tobolowsky in 2012. His portrayal of insurance-selling "pest" Ned Ryerson was well received.

Groundhog Day received generally positive reviews from critics. CinemaScore polls reported that moviegoers gave it an average rating of "B+" on a scale of A+ to F.

It was seen as a significant change from the previous works of Murray and Ramis. Kenneth Turan appreciated it as a gentle, endearing, and smaller-scale film. Hal Hinson called it the best American comedy since 1982's Tootsie (also featuring Murray). He said that Groundhog Day demonstrated Ramis's capable comedic timing, and offered a clever plot without pretension. Critics compared it to a combination of It's a Wonderful Life and the surreal science-fiction/horror television series The Twilight Zone (1959). Roger Ebert compared it to the Murray-starring Christmas-comedy Scrooged (1988), featuring a similar transformation from selfish to selfless. He said that where that film offered a "grim discontent," Groundhog Day offered optimism.

Critics agreed that the film had an obvious moral, but disagreed on its presentation. Desson Thomson found the film initially intriguing but believed it deteriorated into a Hollywood-style morality tale. In Turan's opinion, Groundhog Day started as a traditional Hollywood story, but was earnest enough to convert the audience by the end, and had a "romantic innocence" that prevented it becoming formulaic. Hinson said that the moral core of the story was never presented in a way that insulted the viewer's intelligence or required they sacrifice their cynicism to accept it. He continued that Phil evolves into a better version of himself, but never stops being a jerk. According to Janet Maslin, the film balanced sentimentality and nihilism. The Hollywood Reporter appreciated that the film endorsed small town morals and their positive effect on Phil. The New Statesman argued that it appealed simultaneously to cynicism and optimism.

Variety described the tone as inconsistent and wrote that the film was poorly paced, some scenes going on too long. Owen Gleiberman compared it unfavorably to another time-travel film, Back to the Future (1985), which he found more cleverly structured. He described some scenes as isolated comedy sketches rather than part of a larger narrative. Thomson said that the repetition of scenes worked against the film, making it seem as if no progress was being made. Hinson countered that minor alterations to the scenes kept them interesting as part of a "brilliantly imaginative" and "complex" script. Some reviewers said that the humor was often mild, eliciting small chuckles instead of outright hilarity, although Hinson found it to be "wildly funny." The Hollywood Reporter wrote that it offered a range of comedy and satire, all tempered by the love story between Phil and Rita. Critics highlighted the deeper story behind the comedy. Ebert called it a comedy on the surface but with an underlying thoughtfulness. Maslin said that her initial impression was of a lightweight fare, but it became "strangely affecting."

Murray was consistently praised for his performance. Critics were in agreement that his performance was essential to the film's success by making Phil's transformation believable. Gene Siskel wrote that any other actor could not have prevented the film from becoming too "saccharine." Turan said that Murray's natural gruffness and comedic barbs prevented over-sentimentality. Turan also appreciated the endearing performance by Murray compared to his more abrasive, past performances. Hinson said that Murray had never been funnier. He continued that Murray was a vital component in keeping the film's optimism from seeming dishonest or manufactured. Hinson liked that even after Phil's redemption, he retains a cynical edge. Gleiberman believed that Murray's indifference retains the audience's attention, but added that while Murray was talented enough to play a redeemed person, it was not a good fit for him. Ebert found Murray significantly funnier as a sarcastic antagonist than the friendly protagonist.

Critics were enamored with MacDowell's performance. Siskel said that she lit up the screen when she was on. Maslin called her a "thorough delight," saying that MacDowell's performance offered a comforting, comedic presence. Hinson said that the on-screen chemistry between MacDowell and Murray was "otherworldly" and that she was a perfect fit for comedy. Tobolowsky also received praise as a hilarious "pest."

=== Accolades ===
At the 1993 New York Film Critics Circle Awards, the screenplay came runner-up for Best Screenplay, tying with Schindler's List. The same year, it won Best Comedy Film at the British Comedy Awards. In a then-unprecedented move, in late 1993, Columbia Pictures sent over 4,500 members of the Academy Awards voting committee a custom box containing videotapes of nine of their eligible films. The campaign was estimated to have cost between $400,000 and $650,000. Groundhog Day was included among these nine films, but received no nominations at the 66th Academy Awards.

At the 1994 BAFTA Awards, Rubin and Ramis won the award for Best Original Screenplay. MacDowell won the award for Best Actress at the 20th Saturn Awards ceremony, where Groundhog Day also received nominations for Best Fantasy Film (losing to The Nightmare Before Christmas), Bill Murray for Best Actor (losing to Robert Downey Jr. in Heart and Souls), Best Writing and Best Direction (losing both to Jurassic Park), and Best Costumes for Jennifer Butler (losing to Hocus Pocus). At the American Comedy Awards, Murray and Elliott were nominated for, respectively, Funniest Actor and Funniest Supporting Actor. The film was nominated for Best Dramatic Presentation at the Hugo Awards, losing to Jurassic Park.

== Post-release ==
=== Aftermath ===
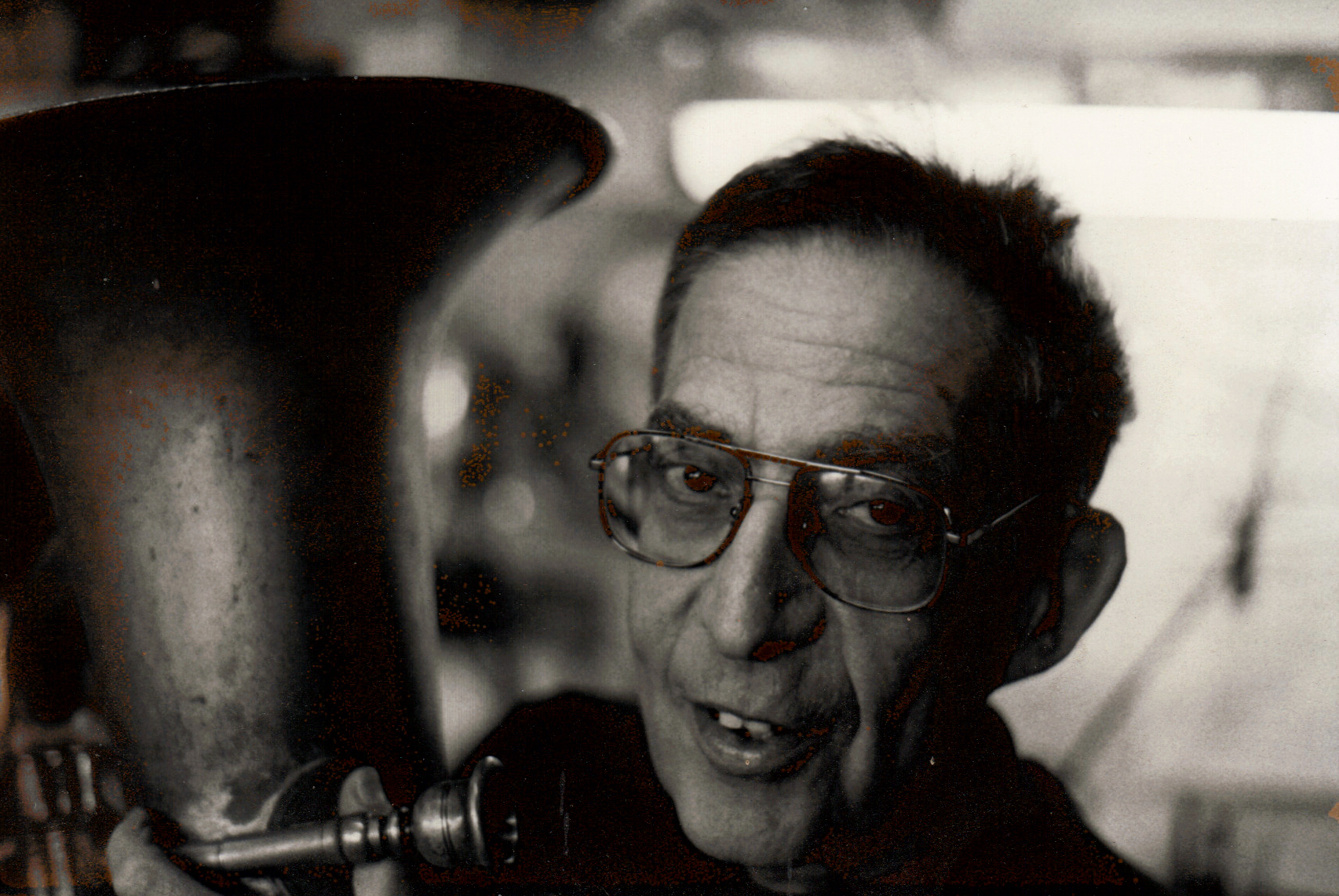
Author Richard A. Lupoff threatened legal action against the filmmakers, alleging that they had copied his own time loop-based story "12:01 P.M."

Despite its relative success, a sequel was ruled out by November 1993. Groundhog Day was one of the films credited with helping to reverse Columbia's failures at the box office, alongside the 1992 films Bram Stoker's Dracula, A Few Good Men and A League of Their Own. Shortly after its release, author Richard A. Lupoff threatened legal action against the filmmakers, alleging the film copied his short story "12:01 P.M." and its associated 1990 short film adaptation about a man stuck in a time loop. The case was never formally filed as the film's production company refused to support legal action. Similarly, author Leon Arden attempted legal action, claiming the film plagiarized his novel One Fine Day, which he had unsuccessfully pitched as a script to Columbia Pictures, about a man repeating April 15. The judge ruled against Arden.

Murray initially hated the finished Groundhog Day. In a 1993 interview, he said that he wanted to focus on the comedy and the underlying theme of people repeating their lives out of fear of change. Ramis wanted to focus on the redeeming power of love. Even so, Murray agreed that Ramis had ultimately been right to do so. The film marked the end of Ramis and Murray's nearly 20-year long partnership that among other things, had created films like Caddyshack, Stripes (1981), and Ghostbusters. After filming concluded, Murray stopped speaking to Ramis. He never contacted Ramis, and refused to speak about him in interviews. Ramis openly spoke about Murray, both criticizing him and discussing his dreams where the pair were once again friends. Some of their close acquaintances, including producer Michael Shamberg, speculated that Murray had grown disillusioned with the assumption that his best work only came in collaboration with Ramis, or that Ramis was responsible for Murray's public persona. Ramis said that he could make Murray as funny as possible, and in return, Murray's improvisational skills could save even the most lackluster of scripts.

Murray felt that Groundhog Day had given him an opportunity to showcase a different side of himself. He admitted that he was bothered by his perception that his previous films focused on jokes without offering a deeper subtext. Even so, he said that he had found solace in meeting the people entertained by his work. Ramis believed that Murray's dramatic turns in films like Lost in Translation (2003) revealed more about Murray than anything else. Speaking in 2009, Ramis said that he thought Murray had grown tired of being the manic, energetic person carrying a film, and wanted to explore his potential. Ramis reached out to Murray to cast him in his 2005 black comedy The Ice Harvest. Murray's brother Brian declined on his behalf. When Ramis enquired further, Brian said that Murray never discussed Ramis. Except for a few brief exchanges at public events, the pair did not speak for nearly two decades. They reunited only in the final few months of Ramis's life in 2014. Rubin said that Murray and his brother now speak fondly of Ramis.

Rubin was in high demand as a screenwriter but retained his desire to tell original stories and refused to tell a traditional Hollywood narrative arc, as he found defying the expected premise and structure the most interesting part. He said that studios wanted him to simply put his spin on a conventional story. Eventually, the offers stopped coming. He continued to write scripts, but none progressed. In a 2017 interview, Rubin admitted some regret that Groundhog Day remained his biggest success.

=== Home media and rereleases ===
Groundhog Day was released on VHS in early September 1993. It debuted at number 11 on the VHS rental chart, rising to number 1 by the end of September, replacing Falling Down. It remained the number 1 rental until mid-October when it was knocked off the top spot by Point of No Return at number 2 and Aladdin at number 1. It was considered the most successful comedy release of late 1993.

The film was released on DVD in 1998. The 2002 "Special Edition" DVD included the film's trailers, an audio commentary by Ramis, and The Weight of Time—a behind-the-scenes documentary about the making of the film, featuring cast and crew interviews. Murray did not participate. A 15th-anniversary edition DVD was released in January 2008. The film was digitally remastered under Ramis's supervision. This set included Ramis' audio commentary and The Weight of Time, and added an interview with Ramis, a short documentary on groundhogs, and deleted scenes. This version was later released on Blu-ray disc in 2009, with an additional picture-in-picture feature with Tobolowsky reprising his role as Ned to provide facts about the film.

To celebrate the film's 25th anniversary in February 2018, a remastered 4k resolution version of the film was released in select theaters. In April 2018, the Academy of Motion Picture Arts and Sciences presented a special one-night screening of the remastered film at the Samuel Goldwyn Theater in Beverly Hills, California. The remastered version was also released as an Ultra HD Blu-ray disc, Blu-ray disc, and a digital download. It included the same extras as the 15th-anniversary edition.

To celebrate the film's 30th anniversary, the film was released in select theaters for two days in February 2023, with one of those days being February 2, Groundhog Day.

== Analysis ==
=== Time loop duration ===
The duration of Phil's real-time entrapment in the time loop has been the subject of much discussion. Ramis once said that he believed the film took place over ten years. When a blogger estimated the actual length to be approximately nine years, Ramis disputed that estimate and his own. He replied that it takes at least 10 years to become good at an activity (such as Phil learning ice sculpting and to speak French) and "allotting for the down-time and misguided years he spent, it had to be more like 30 or 40 years." A similar estimate suggests that it takes at least 10,000 hours of study (just over a year's worth of time) to become an expert in a field, and given the number of loops seen or mentioned on screen, and how long Phil could spend per day studying, that Phil spent approximately 12,400 days, or nearly 34 years, trapped in the loop. In Rubin's original concept draft, Phil himself estimates that he has been trapped for between 70 and 80 years, having used books to track the passage of time.

Born to a Jewish family, Ramis had adopted a Buddhist lifestyle from his second wife, embracing some of its precepts. He said that based on Buddhist doctrine, it takes approximately 10,000 years for a soul to evolve to the next level. In 2005, Rubin said, "it became this weird political issue because if you asked the studio, 'How long was the repetition?', they'd say, 'Two weeks'. But the point of the movie to me was that you had to feel you were enduring something that was going on for a long time.... For me it had to be—I don't know. A hundred years. A lifetime." In his book Groundhog Day, Ryan Gilbey thought the vagueness surrounding the length of the loop was one of the most remarkable elements of the film. Just as there is no justification for why or how Phil is caught in the loop, the length of time is only as long as it takes for Phil to become a better person.

=== Thematic analysis ===
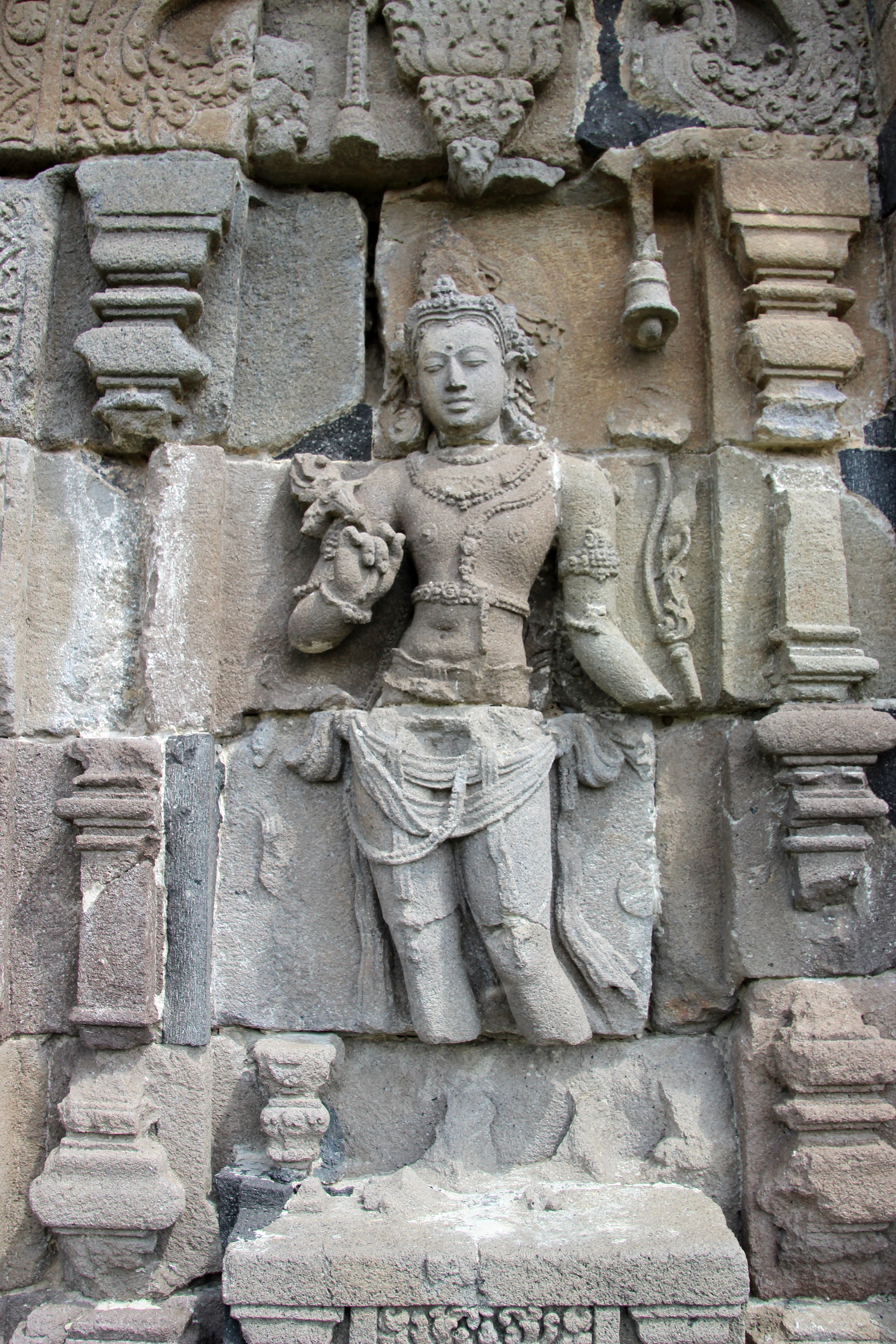
A 9th-century bodhisattva bas-relief. The character of Phil Connors has been interpreted as a bodhisattva: someone who helps others reach nirvana.

The film has been interpreted in many ways by different groups. Rubin has said that he did not set out to write the film as a spiritual allegory. He simply wanted to tell a story about human life and periods when a person becomes trapped in a cycle that they cannot escape. He said it was not "just about a man repeating the same day but a story about how to live. Whose life isn't a series of days? Who doesn't feel stuck from time to time?" In the bowling alley scene, Phil asks two Punxsutawney residents if they understand what it is like to be stuck in a place where nothing they do matters. He is referring to his own situation, but the two men, trapped in their own small-town lives, know exactly what he means.

While Rubin and Ramis discussed several of the philosophical and spiritual aspects of the film, they "never intended [it] to be anything more than a good, heartfelt, entertaining story." Murray saw the original script as an interpretation of how people repeat the same day over and over because they are afraid of change. Rubin added that at the start of the loop, it is the worst day of Phil's life. By being forced to change who he is, to embrace the world around him, and each moment of his day, it becomes the best day of his life; the day he falls in love. In a 2017 interview, Murray said he believed Groundhog Day still resonated because it is about "the idea that we just have to try again... it's such a beautiful, powerful idea."

Rubin has been contacted throughout the years by different experts providing their own interpretations. It has been seen as a Christian allegory with Punxsutawney Phil representing Jesus Christ, an example of the Nietzschean concept of eternal return, the spirit of Judaism, and the essence of homeopathy. It has also been interpreted as an adaptation of the Greek mythological figure Sisyphus who is also condemned to an eternal, daily punishment. Others have found significance in the numbers present in the film. Ramis himself was fascinated by Rubin's original draft and its concepts of reincarnation. The date of Groundhog Day also has implications. It is set between the end of winter—characterized in the film as a period of satire and the end of things—and spring—a season represented by comedy and connected with themes of renewal and redemption.

Buddhist leaders commended the representation of the ideologies of regeneration. Phil can be interpreted as a bodhisattva, someone who has reached the brink of Nirvana and returns to Earth to help others to do the same. His loops can represent saṃsāra, a cycle of suffering from which he must escape. In the Jewish faith, Phil's escape or reward can be seen as him being returned to Earth to perform moral deeds or mitzvot—the precepts and commandments of God. In Christianity, his journey can be interpreted as a form of resurrection or a means of securing a place in heaven. In Falun Gong religious philosophy, the film has been interpreted as a message that the spiritual self cannot evolve until it learns from past mistakes. In Catholicism, Phil's situation can be identified as a form of purgatory, escaped only by embracing selflessness. MacDowell said "Wouldn't it be great if we had that kind of experience and learn something from it? We go through life and are not always conscious of it... whatever religion you want to base yourself in, that's ultimately why we're here." Groundhog Day can also be interpreted as a secular tale in which Phil is experiencing an existential crisis where primal self-indulgence is no longer satisfying, causing him to fall into a depression that he escapes by taking ownership of his own self-improvement; he then uses his improved persona to benevolently help others.

Phil initially compares himself to a god, declaring that as a weatherman, he makes the weather. After several loops, he comes to believe he is a god, asserting that omnipotence may be mistaken for having lived so long one simply knows everything. Using his knowledge he is able to manipulate events in his favor. The repetition gives Phil an opportunity to escape from his own narcissistic self-confinement. Unwilling to change himself, the means to do so are forced upon him. After constant rejection by Rita and his idea of love, Phil hits an emotional low and repeatedly commits suicide. At one point, he suggests that he has killed himself enough times to no longer exist. It is at this point, Ramis suggests, that Phil becomes ready to change.

It is only when Phil stops using the loops to indulge his own desires and instead uses them to selflessly help others that he is freed. In repeatedly failing to save the old homeless man, Phil is also forced to accept that he is not a god. Similarly, regardless of how much knowledge he gains about Rita, and despite his accomplishments learned throughout the loops, he is unable to impress her enough to earn her love. He wins her over only once he stops trying to do so, and instead demonstrates genuine care for others without fakery or self-interest, will likely reset, and it will have all been for naught. Only then does Rita return his affections. The aspects of Rita that Phil mocked at the start of the film have become qualities he admires and respects, and in turn, Phil receives Rita's love not because he desires it, but because he has genuinely become the type of person that Rita could love. This demonstrates the redeeming power of love, something Ramis wanted to emphasize. For him, Groundhog Day represents having the strength and knowledge to make a change when faced with the opportunity to repeat previous mistakes.

Rick Brookhiser argues that it is because Phil fully appreciates every facet of the day that he is rewarded by the day being taken from him. He said, "loving life includes loving the fact that it goes." John Seamon said that where other films use memory as a means of reflection or escape, Phil effectively lives within his memories, repeating them indefinitely; he has no hope for a future because everything will reset. By remembering and appreciating new details, Phil is able to grow as a person and becomes the agent of his own change. Rubin said Phil will not return to his old ways after his experiences, but might suffer disappointment that no day will ever live up to his final, perfect February 2, after which he essentially loses his superpowers.

== Legacy ==
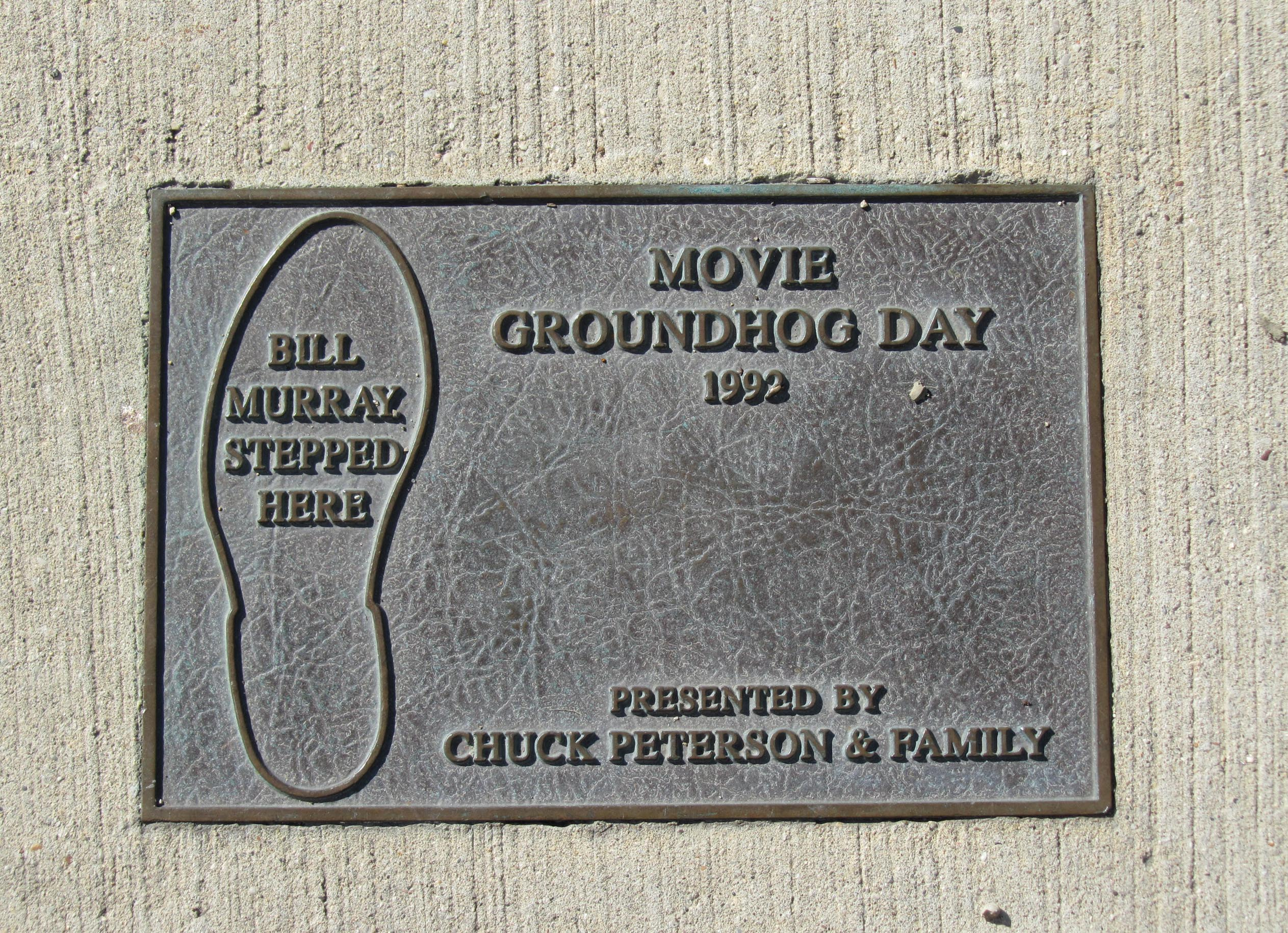
A floor-positioned plaque in Woodstock, Illinois, commemorating the pothole Bill Murray's character steps in during Groundhog Day

Groundhog Day is considered one of the most beloved comedy films ever made, an all-time classic, and a pop culture touchstone. In 2020, Paste described it as having a "mythic, permanent pop cultural status reserved for few films." The film's success made Ramis a credible comedy director, opening up more creative opportunities for him. Over the rest of the 1990s, he would direct 1996's Multiplicity (also starring MacDowell), 1999's Analyze This, and 2000's Bedazzled. Groundhog Day also showcased Murray's capabilities as an actor, changing perceptions of him as a comedian to a broad-ranged actor and credible romantic lead. His performance is seen as a transitioning point to later roles in serious films like Rushmore (1998), his Academy Award-nominated performance in Lost in Translation, and Moonrise Kingdom (2012). Rubin started a blog in 2007 that featured fictional conversations between himself and Phil Connors, who had since retired to live on a mountainside near Taos, New Mexico. Rubin taught screenwriting at Harvard University for several years.

Its impact on Woodstock and Punxsutawney was lasting and significant. Since the film's release, Woodstock has hosted its own Groundhog Day festivals. These have included groundhog Woodstock Willie, screenings of the film, and walking tours of filming locations. The town attracts approximately 1,000 tourists for its yearly event, which has featured appearances by Albert, Rubin, and Tobolowsky. Punxsutawney, which once drew only a few hundred visitors to its festival, has since attracted tens of thousands. The year following the film's release, over 35,000 people visited the town for Groundhog Day. Residents appreciate the film's impact on the town, but assert that their focus remains on Punxsutawney Phil and the long-lived festival. In Woodstock, plaques are positioned at key locations used in the film, commemorating moments including Phil meeting Ned, the pothole in which Phil trips, and the town square pavilion where Phil and Rita share a dance.

As of 2016, Rubin continued to receive mail from fans, philosophers, and religious leaders; their content ranged from simple letters to sermons and dissertations. He has spoken of psychiatrists who recommend the film to their patients, and addicts who have told him that it helped them realize they were trapped in a repeating cycle of their own. Some time after the film's release, Murray changed his opinion about it. He called it "probably the best work I've done," adding "and probably the best work Harold will ever do." In 2018, Tobolowsky said "I think [Murray's] performance in Groundhog Day will stand as one of the greatest comedic performances of all time.... He is able to be both antagonist and protagonist at the same time in the same film. He's everything that's horrible and everything that's wonderful.... I think it's gonna stand up as long as films are made." The city of Chicago made a proclamation on February 2, 2024, as "Harold Ramis Day", in a ceremony joined by Murray, Ramis' widow Erica Mann Ramis, and other actors from the film.

=== Critical reassessment ===
Groundhog Day is considered one of the greatest films ever made. Rotten Tomatoes assesses a 93% approval rating from the aggregated reviews of 145 critics, with an average rating of 7.9/10. The consensus reads, "Smart, sweet, and inventive, Groundhog Day highlights Murray's dramatic gifts while still leaving plenty of room for laughs." The film has a score of 72 out of 100 on Metacritic based on 15 critics, indicating "generally favorable reviews".

In 2004, The New Yorker called it Ramis's masterpiece. In 2005, as part of his The Great Movies series, Ebert raised his original score for the film from three stars to a full four stars. In this updated review, Ebert said that he had underestimated the film and noted that Murray's performance was essential to making the film work. That same year, Jonah Goldberg called it one of the best films of the previous 40 years, positioning it alongside It's a Wonderful Life as one of America's most uplifting and timeless films. In 2009, literary theorist Stanley Fish listed it as one of the ten best American films. He wrote, "The comedy and the philosophy (how shall one live?) do not sit side by side, but inhabit each other in a unity that is incredibly satisfying." It is listed in the 2013 film reference book 1001 Movies You Must See Before You Die, which says "Bill Murray gives what may be the best and warmest performance of his career in this genius comedy—arguably the best of the 1990s". The Guardian attributes its lasting appeal to its use of a classic redemption arc like Ebenezer Scrooge in the 1843 novella A Christmas Carol, and its refusal to explain why the loop occurs, making it less like a typical mainstream film.

In 2000, the American Film Institute (AFI) ranked Groundhog Day number 34 on its 100 Years...100 Laughs list recognizing the best comedy films. In 2005, the film's screenplay was listed as the twenty-seventh greatest screenplay of the preceding 75 years on the Writers Guild of America's (WGA) 101 Greatest Screenplays list. In a 2008 AFI poll of 1,500 industry members, Groundhog Day was ranked as the eighth-best fantasy film. That same year Empire listed the film 259th on its list of the 500 Greatest Movies of All Time. In 2014, a poll of 2,120 entertainment-industry members by The Hollywood Reporter ranked it the 63rd-best film of all time. In 2015, the screenplay was listed as the third-funniest on the WGA's 101 Funniest Screenplays list, behind Some Like It Hot (1958) and Annie Hall (1977). That same year, it was ranked the 71st-best American film by a BBC Culture poll of international film critics. In 2017, the BBC polled 253 critics (118 female, 135 male) from across 52 countries on the funniest film made. Groundhog Day came fourth, behind Annie Hall, Dr. Strangelove (1964), and Some Like It Hot.

Several publications have ranked it as one of the greatest comedy films of all time, including: number one by Empire (2019); number five by Time Out; number 10 by Rotten Tomatoes; number 11 by IGN; number 18 by Paste; number 23 by The Daily Telegraph; and unranked by Film School Rejects and Vogue. Rotten Tomatoes also listed the film number 86 on its list of 200 essential movies to watch. Similarly, it has been ranked as one of the greatest films of the 1990s, including: number 4 by IndieWire; number 5 by Slate; number 11 by Rolling Stone; number 12 by ShortList; number 15 by The A.V. Club; number 28 by Rotten Tomatoes; number 41 by Slant Magazine; number 55 by the British Film Institute; and unranked by Time Out.

=== Cultural impact ===
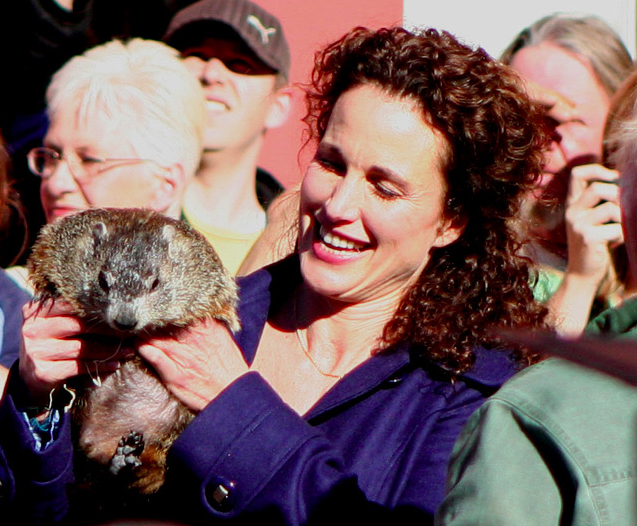
Andie MacDowell with a groundhog on Groundhog Day 2008

William Goldman in 1993 said "I think Groundhog Day is the one that will be—of all of the movies that came out this year, it's the one that will be remembered in 10 years." The same year, Desson Thomson opined "Groundhog will never be designated a national film treasure by the Library of Congress." In 2006, the film was selected by the United States Library of Congress to be preserved in the National Film Registry for being "culturally, historically, or aesthetically significant."

Several filmmakers have spoken of their appreciation for Groundhog Day or cited it as an inspiration in their own careers, including David O. Russell, Terry Jones, and Jay Roach. Roach called it the film that "changed him." Author Stephen King and artist Gillian Wearing have named it as one of their favorite films; Wearing cited its unusual structure and intelligent philosophical message. The film's success helped to legitimize the use of fantasy in mainstream comedy films, laying the groundwork for future fantasy comedies such as Liar Liar (1997), The Truman Show (1998), and Click (2006).

The phrase "Groundhog Day" has become a common term to reference a repetitive, unpleasant, and monotonous situation. It is recognized by dictionaries under two definitions: the holiday itself, and "a situation in which events are or appear to be continually repeated." The term's use is such that it has been defined as a cliché to refer to a situation in this way. It has been invoked (sometimes inaccurately) by singers, sports stars, comedians, actors, politicians, archbishops, and former Guantanamo Bay detention camp inmates. Then-President Bill Clinton referenced the film in a 1996 speech to troops stationed in Bosnia. The term was used during the 2020 COVID-19 pandemic, to refer to the monotony of quarantine and isolation associated with attempts to stem the spread of the virus. The term has been applied to describe police violence against blacks and other minority groups due to the cyclic nature of how such events occur and resolve.

The narrative concept of someone trapped in a repeating segment of time can be traced back to 1904, and is a popular trope, particularly in science-fiction. Groundhog Day was responsible for popularizing the idea to the general public. Time loops have since been used in several films (including Naken (2000), Source Code (2011), Edge of Tomorrow (2014), Happy Death Day (2017) and its sequel, and Palm Springs (2020)), television shows (including Russian Doll, Buffy the Vampire Slayer, Angel, and The X-Files), and video games (including The Legend of Zelda: Majora's Mask, Outer Wilds, and Deathloop). These narratives often involve a central flawed character who must evolve to escape their chronological imprisonment. The influence of Groundhog Day is such that TV Tropes refers to this narrative arc as the "Groundhog Day Loop". Rubin noted that with his script, he "stumbled upon a story with all the makings of a classic, so simple and true that it could be retold many different ways by many different storytellers." It has been referenced across a range of media, including the 1998 novel About a Boy, the music video for the Craig David song "7 Days", and the Doctor Who audio drama Flip-Flop, that features a time loop on the planet Punxsutawnee. Writing for IGN, Michael Swaim postulated that since Groundhog Day popularized the time loop narrative, it had increased in mainstream popularity in part due to the Flynn effect—a statement on the increasing IQ of the population—that meant audiences could easily follow the more complex narratives, and the desire for nostalgia in the postmodern era of the early 21st century.

On February 2, 2016, fans in Liverpool, England, gathered to watch the film repeatedly for 24 hours. Since February 2 that year (apart from 2017), Sky Cinema has played the film on repeat for 24 hours. In 2018, the New York Museum of Modern Art debuted a series of films chosen by polling 35 literary and religious scholars, which started with Groundhog Day. There was conflict between the scholars as so many of them wanted to write about the film for the presentation.

== Adaptations ==
A sequel was ruled out shortly after the film's release in 1993. Rubin also holds a story credit on the 2004 Italian remake of Groundhog Day, called È già ieri (translated as It's Already Yesterday), and commonly known as Stork Day. When asked about a sequel in 2018, MacDowell said it would never happen because "I know [Murray]. He's not going to do it." Despite this, Murray, Tobolowsky, and Doyle-Murray reprised their roles in a commercial for the Jeep Gladiator played during Super Bowl LIV on February 2, 2020. Filmed in Woodstock, the commercial recreates scenes from the film, and features Murray again trapped in a time loop. He uses the Jeep Gladiator to explore Punxsutawney alongside Punxsutawney Phil. Murray called it his first and last commercial. In April 2020, Jeep released a series of modified versions of the advert to promote social distancing during the 2020 COVID-19 pandemic. Murray provided creative input on the edit.

In the years since the film's release, Rubin had worked on a musical adaptation of Groundhog Day, partly out of boredom and partly because a musical was not covered by the rights he had signed over to Columbia. In 2003, Stephen Sondheim expressed interest creating a musical but this project was never realized. When Matthew Warchus and Tim Minchin approached Rubin in 2012, he had already developed a narrative outline, jokes, and a refined list of 12 songs. He had been unable to progress the idea further without a composer. Coming off the success of Matilda the Musical, Warchus and Minchin collaborated with Rubin for several years to produce the Groundhog Day musical. The musical debuted in August 2016, at The Old Vic theatre in London to generally positive reviews. A Broadway version started running in 2017. The show was nominated in several categories at the 2017 Laurence Olivier Awards, winning Best Actor and Best New Musical. Murray attended a Broadway show in 2017, alongside Doyle-Murray and Rubin.

A video game narrative sequel was released in September 2019. Groundhog Day: Like Father Like Son was developed by Tequila Works and published by Sony Pictures Virtual Reality for PlayStation VR, Oculus Rift, and HTC Vive. The game casts players as Phil's son, Phil Connors Jr., who has grown up in the shadow of his beloved father. Phil Jr. becomes trapped in his own time loop in Punxsutawney and is forced to help others and improve himself to earn his freedom. It received mixed critical reviews.

== See also ==
- List of films featuring time loops

== Works cited ==
- Eagan, Daniel (2010). America's Film Legacy: The Authoritative Guide to the Landmark Movies in the National Film Registry. London: A & C Black. pp. 811–812. ISBN 978-0-8264-2977-3.
- Gilbey, Ryan (2004). Groundhog Day. London: British Film Institute. ISBN 978-1-84457-032-4.
- Ginsberg, Steve (2006). "Groundhog Day" (PDF). Washington, D.C., United States: National Film Registry. Archived (PDF) from the original on July 13, 2019.
- Glausser, Wayne (2019). "Groundhog Day at 25: Conflict and Inspiration at the Tipping Point of Seasonal Genres". Journal of Religion and Film. 23 (1). Omaha, Nebraska: University of Nebraska Omaha. Archived from the original on July 5, 2020.
- Klady, Leonard (January 3, 1994). "Top 100 Pix Take $8 bil globally". Variety. Vol. 353. Los Angeles, California. pp. 1, 42. ISSN 0042-2738.
- Racicot, William (2006). "Anything Different is Good: Incremental Repetition, Courtly Love, and Purgatory in Groundhog Day". In Marshall, David W. (ed.). Mass Market Medieval: Essays on the Middle Ages in Popular Culture. Jefferson, North Carolina: McFarland Publishing. ISBN 978-0-78642-922-6.
- Rubin, Danny (2012). How to Write "Groundhog Day". Ventura, California: Triad Publishing. ASIN B0072PEV6U.
- Schneider, Steven Jay (2013). 1001 Movies You Must See Before You Die. Boston, Massachusetts: Murdoch Books Pty Limited. ISBN 978-0-7641-6613-6.
- Seamon, John (2015). Memory and Movies: What Films Can Teach Us about Memory. Cambridge, Massachusetts: MIT Press. ISBN 978-0-26202-971-1.
- Slahi, Mohamedou Ould (2015). Guantánamo Diary. New York City: Little, Brown and Company. ISBN 978-0-316-32860-9.
