= Scottish Assessors =

Association of land valuation assessors

Scottish Assessors (the Scottish Assessors Association, SSA) is a voluntary, non-statutory association of land valuation assessors and their senior staff in Scotland. The association encourages a consistent approach to the administration of valuation, council tax and electoral registration.

Founded in 1975, in conjunction with the abolition of the Scottish counties, Scottish Assessors is the successor to the Association of Lands Valuation Assessors of Scotland, founded in 1957, and the Association of Lands Valuation Assessors, founded in 1886.

The SAA liaises with the Valuation Office Agency of England and Wales, the Valuation Office (Oifig Luachála) of Ireland, and the Land and Property Service in Northern Ireland.

== Assessors ==
Scottish Assessors are independent public officials who decide the rateable value of property listed on a local valuation roll. They must be members of the Royal Institution of Chartered Surveyors and work under the umbrella body, the Scottish Assessors Association.
