= Arrested development =

Medical term

The term "arrested development" has had multiple meanings for over 200 years. In the field of medicine, the term "arrested development" was first used, circa 1835–1836, to mean a stoppage of physical development; the term continues to be used in the same way.

In contrast, the UK's Mental Health Act 1983 used the term "arrested development" to characterize a form of mental disorder comprising severe mental impairment, resulting in a lack of intelligence. However, some researchers have objected to the notion that mental development can be "arrested" or stopped, preferring to consider mental status as continuing to develop in other ways. Consequently, the term "arrested development" is no longer used when referring to a developmental disorder in mental health.

Arrested development is key in the insight of self-domestication in the evolution of hominidae where it involves being in an environment that favors reduction in aggression, including interspecific and intraspecific antagonism, for survival, in favor of attitudes that favor living together in a group, social behavior, traits that favor the group as a whole to come to the front stage, and elimination of bullies— individuals with an antisocial personality disorder.

In anthropology and archaeology, the term "arrested development" means that a plateau of development in some sphere has been reached. Often it is a technological plateau such as the development of high temperature ceramics without glaze because of a lack of materials, or copper smelting without the development of bronze, because of a lack of tin.
