= Valuation Office Agency =

Government body in the United Kingdom

- Region served: England and Wales, Scotland
- Parent organization: HM Revenue and Customs
- Website: www.gov.uk/government/organisations/valuation-office-agency

The Valuation Office Agency was an executive agency of His Majesty's Revenue and Customs until 31 March 2026, at which time it was abolished - scrapped in the Government's press release -with its functions subsumed into HMRC. The terms "Valuation Office(r)" (VO) are still widely used for its functions and staff, although it is no longer an "Agency".

The VO values properties for the purpose of Council Tax and for non-domestic rates in England and Wales (in Scotland this function is performed by the Scottish Assessors). This work is undertaken on behalf of the Department for Levelling Up, Housing and Communities in England, and the Welsh Government in Wales. It also incorporates the rent officer service which determines fair rents on those properties which remain under rent control, and the local housing allowance.

Across Great Britain, including Scotland, the VO also provides additional valuation services to HM Revenue and Customs through its District Valuer Services business stream. This includes property valuations for the purpose of assessing taxes, such as capital gains and inheritance tax. District Valuer Services also provides a wide range of valuation services to the public sector, such as asset valuations for resource accounting and compulsory purchase advice on the purchase and sale of property, specialist building surveying advice, and valuation of mineral-bearing property, landfill sites, and plant and machinery.

In April 2008, following a restructure, District Valuer Services were divided into National and Central Services, who look after the VO's statutory services to HMRC, and Commercial Services which provide commercial property valuation services to the public sector.

The predecessors of the Valuation Office were the separate Valuation Office organisations in England and Wales (established in 1910) and in Scotland (established in 1911). The Valuation Office Agency was subsequently created as a merger of these two and became a Next Steps Agency of the Inland Revenue on 30 September 1991.

The VO employs 3,990 people (full-time equivalent) in 86 offices. It is the largest single employer of Chartered Surveyors in the UK. The current chief executive is Jonathan Russell, appointed in September 2021.

The equivalent body to the VO for Northern Ireland is the Land and Property Services agency. In Scotland it is the Scottish Assessors (for Council Tax and business rating purposes only).

== History ==
The Finance Act 1910 introduced a version of land value tax on that part of the capital appreciation of a property which followed from the expenditure of public money on communal development such as roads or other public services.

In order to apply this tax, it was necessary to value all property in the UK and the Inland Revenue set up the Valuation Office to carry out this task. This led to the Valuation Office Survey (1910-1915).

The VO soon began to receive requests from other government departments for valuation assistance - a task which it continues to undertake today. It was this other government work that led to the VO's retention after the 1910 land value tax was abolished in the 1920s.

During the following years, the VO took on some major tasks, such as in 1931 which saw a further proposed tax on land values, and from 1939 to 1945, when it valued property destroyed by enemy action in the UK during the Second World War.

In 1950 the role of the VO was expanded when it took over responsibility for the valuation of property in England and Wales for rating purposes. Prior to this year it had been the task of each local authority to compile and maintain its own rating list, but this had led to inconsistencies in valuations. When in 1948 a new system of government equalisation grants to local authorities was introduced, uniformity in rating valuation was essential, and this could only be provided by a central organisation such as the VO.

It was not feasible to absorb the extra rating staff and work into the hundred existing VO offices, so a separate network of 268 new offices were opened with the majority of their staff being transferred from local authorities.

Each local office was headed by a dual role district valuer and valuation officer responsible for all of the rating and revenue work within the geographical responsibility of his/her office. There were regional offices each headed by a superintending valuer who was responsible for the general management of the district valuers within his region and liaison between the local offices and the Chief Valuer's Office in London.

Over the years the number of offices has reduced as the rating and other functions of the VO were combined into so-called "integrated" offices and the network was slimmed down as the number of local offices was closed, and by 1996 there were only 93.

Staffing numbers have varied in accordance with the workload peaking in the years around the times of rating revaluations when it was necessary to increase staff to carry out the revaluation and to settle appeals arising from it. So in 1965 there were around 7,000 compared to 2,600 prior to 1950. By 1994/5 there were 4,775 permanent staff.

In 1998 the VO underwent a large-scale re-organisation which saw a large reduction in the size of the regional layer of management and the closure of regional offices. The district valuer post in the local office was abolished, and there was a reorganisation of the local offices into 24 groups, each headed by a group valuation officer. A number of regionally based specialist rating units were set up to take over responsibility from the local offices for the more complex or higher-value non-domestic rating assessments. As part of this re-organisation further offices were closed, leaving a total of 85. As of 2017-2018, the VOA continues to undergo transformation with further office closures in England and Wales.

=== Revaluations ===
Rating system revaluations have taken place irregularly. The first was due in 1952 but was postponed until 1956, where, unusually, the residential rateable assessments were based on 1939 values. The next due in 1961 was postponed until 1963 due to difficulties in valuing houses, and the 1973 revaluation took place five years after it was originally scheduled.

The next revaluation should have been in 1982 but was again postponed until 1990. This revaluation was purely for commercial property, as domestic rating had been abolished. Since then there has been a five-yearly cycle of commercial revaluations; however, on 18 October 2012, the government introduced a new Growth and Structure Bill into the House of Commons which included measures to postpone the next business rates revaluation in England from 2015 to 2017. In the Spring Statement 2018, the Chancellor Philip Hammond announced a move to more frequent revaluations, which would now be held every three years, starting from the next revaluation in 2021.

In 1993 domestic rating returned in the form of the Council Tax where a residential property's sale price, rather than its rental value, is the basis for assessment. It was intended to have a domestic revaluation in England in 2007, but following the domestic revaluation in Wales, where over a third of households saw a banding increase, it was decided to postpone the revaluation of England. The current government announced on 24 September 2010 there will be no revaluation of council tax bands in England during this parliament. In another announcement on 4 December 2010, the Department for Communities and Local Government said the revaluation of the Welsh Council Tax bands, pencilled in for 2015, would not now go ahead, and decisions over any future re-valuations should be taken in Cardiff Bay.

=== The Rent Service ===
The Rent Service (TRS) was a government agency providing a rental valuation service to local authorities in England supplying them with a range of valuations to assist them in settling claims for housing benefits from claimants living in privately rented housing. Valuations were provided for landlords and tenants for fair rent registrations made under Section 70 of the Rent Act 1977 (amended by the Housing Act 1988) and assisting local authorities with housing renovation grant applications.

The introduction of the new Local Housing Allowance for new claimants in April 2008 had a significant impact on the Rent Service. It was expected that by 2011 its workload would be approximately 75% lower than the level in 2007–8. The residual functions of The Rent Service were transferred from the Department for Work and Pensions to the Valuation Office Agency on 1 April 2009.

=== Working more efficiently ===
In November 2007, chief executive Andrew Hudson announced to staff a series of measures to improve its service to customers and take account of a reduction in government funding. The plans included more centralisation of routine processing functions; better management of data; a reduction in the space the Agency occupies through digitisation of records; and the introduction of more flexible ways of working, supported by enhanced technology.

=== VOA 2015 ===
In February 2009 Andrew Hudson was named as the next managing director of the public services and growth directorate in HM Treasury. His replacement at the VOA was Penny Ciniewicz, who had joined the Civil Service in 1997 and since then has worked in the Department of Trade and Industry and the Cabinet Office. Prior to joining the VOA, she was Director, Knowledge, Analysis and Intelligence in HMRC.

Ciniewicz brought across a number of staff from HMRC to assist her with her plan known as 'VOA 2015'. VOA 2015 was a continuation of the search for cost savings by staff reductions (staff numbers reduced by 300 in the year 2009-10), the introduction of new technology, and office closures. The plan took into account the additional 20% cost cuts required by the government.

As part of VOA 2015 the CEO abolished the 'group' structure and its associated group valuation officer position, organising staff by function into business streams rather than by location.

During the period of 2015 - 2020, just about every aspect of the "Targeted Operating Model" used for VOA 2015 was dismantled, as the system did not work with such a small Agency, and was also very unpopular with staff. The VOA returned to a regional structure, named Regional Valuation Units, to save face, and Ciniewicz was promoted back into HMRC.

=== Check Challenge Appeal ===
In April 2017 launched a new online service, Check Challenge Appeal (CCA). The Valuation Office Agency (VOA) deals with checks and challenges and the independent Valuation Tribunal for England handles any appeals. The online service allows users to "claim" a property and to check the information the VOA hold, this record can then be amended or challenged and if not resolved then they can move to appeal.

The CCA service was heavily criticised by service users; the Treasury Select Committee undertook an inquiry. The Committee heard evidence from a large number of businesses and trade organisations. Their findings were that the service was broken, delays were common, there were issues with staffing in specialist roles, and public confidence had been eroded.

The Government promised to make changes at the VOA as part of a fundamental review in its reply in February 2020.
