= Richard Henzel =

American actor

Richard Henzel (born June 15, 1949) is a Chicago-based stage, film, TV, and voice-over actor.

He is best known as the voice of Ernie Keebler, the Keebler Elf (since 2016), and as one of the two DJ voices heard on the clock radio in the movie Groundhog Day. Notable stage roles include G. Bernard Shaw in the world premiere of Shaw Vs. Tunney, Grandpa in the world premiere of The Magic Victrola at the Chicago Lyric Opera and the world premiere of The Christians by Lucas Hnath and directed by Les Waters at Actors Theatre of Louisville. He played Norman in On Golden Pond at Jeff Daniels' Purple Rose Theatre in Chelsea, Michigan; George Bernard Shaw in Dear Liar, Verner/Hugo in Noel Coward In Two Keys, and Mark Twain In Person, all for Shaw Chicago Theatre; Henri in Heroes at The Stormfield Theatre in Lansing, MI, directed by Kristine Thatcher and also starring Gary Houston and Richard Marlatt; Mark Van Doren in Night And Her Stars for The Gift Theatre, directed by Michael Patrick Thornton; and Boss Finley in Sweet Bird of Youth at The Artistic Home Theatre directed by Dale Calandra.

Also among his credits is his one-man stage show Mark Twain In Person in which he has appeared over a thousand times since 1967, in forty states, Canada, Wales, on the Mississippi River aboard the Steamboat Delta Queen, and for Royal Viking Sea's "Theatre At Sea" cruise that sailed from New York City to Montreal in 1985.

== Awards ==
- 1978 Joseph Jefferson Award Nomination for Best Actor in a Principal Role
- 1988 Chicago Emmy Award Nomination for Best New Work, Mark Twain's Carnival of Crime, as Mark Twain
- 1989 CINE Award for How I Got into the Literary Profession, as Mark Twain

== Mark Twain Audiobooks by Richard Henzel ==
- Mark Twain's Book for Bad Boys and Girls, written by R. Kent Rasmussen
- Chapters From My Autobiography
- Pudd'nhead Wilson (unabridged)
- The Adventures of Tom Sawyer (unabridged)
- "The Turning Point In My Life"
- The American Claimant
- A Connecticut Yankee In King Arthur's Court
- Mark Twain's Views Of Religion
- Roughing It
- The War Prayer
- Those Extraordinary Twins
- The Facts Concerning the Recent Carnival of Crime in Connecticut
- To the Person Sitting in Darkness
- The Adventures of Huckleberry Finn
- Extract from Capt. Stormfield's Visit to Heaven
- The Best of Mark Twain In Person Vol. 1
- The Best of Mark Twain In Person Vol. 2
- Is Shakespeare Dead?
- "Some Thoughts on the Science of Onanism"
- The Mysterious Stranger
- The Prince and the Pauper
- The Man That Corrupted Hadleyburg
- What Is Man?
- Mark Twain's (Burlesque) Autobiography and First Romance, Preface and Notes by Richard Henzel.
- Life on the Mississippi
- The Innocents Abroad
- The Death of Jean
- The Private History of a Campaign that Failed
