= Council Tax =

Local taxation system in Great Britain

Council Tax is a local taxation system used in England, Scotland and Wales. It is a tax on domestic property, which was introduced in 1993 by the Local Government Finance Act 1992, replacing the short-lived Community Charge (also known as "poll tax"), which in turn had replaced the domestic rates. Each property is assigned one of eight bands in England and Scotland (A to H), or nine bands in Wales (A to I), based on property value, and the tax is set as a fixed amount for each band. The higher the band, the higher the tax. Some property is exempt from the tax, and some people are exempt from the tax, while some get a discount.

In 2011, the average annual levy on a property in England was £1,196 (equivalent to £1,769 in 2025). In 2014–15, the tax raised enough money to cover 24.3% of council expenditure.

Council Tax is difficult to avoid or evade and therefore has one of the highest collection rates of any tax, with in-year collection rates of 97.0% in 2014–15.

== Organisation ==
Council Tax is collected by the local authority (known as the collecting authority). However, it may consist of components (precepts) levied and redistributed to other agencies or authorities (each known as a precepting authority).

=== The nature of the Council Tax ===
The Valuation Tribunal Service has cleared up many previous doubts regarding the exact nature of Council Tax and states that:

The tax is a mix of a property tax and a personal tax. Generally, where two or more persons reside in a dwelling the full tax is payable. If one person resides in the dwelling then 75% is payable. An empty dwelling attracts only a 50% charge unless the billing authority has made a determination otherwise. (Note: This is no longer always the case, unless a statutory exemption applies)

At the bottom and middle end of the market, Council Tax is a progressive tax based on the value of the property; the higher the value of the property, the higher the amount of tax levied irrespective of the number of inhabitants at the property (except the reduction allowed for single tenancy). However, there is only one band for properties valued (in 1991 or, for those built later, the value they would have had then) above £320,000, and so the tax stops increasing after this point. Therefore, the tax has been criticised for being disproportionate, with those in more expensive houses not paying as much as those in smaller houses as a proportion of the value of the house, and has therefore been called a "new poll tax for the poor".

The valuation of the property is carried out by the Valuation Office Agency in England and Wales and by Scottish Assessors in Scotland.

=== Council Tax arrears ===
An area that is facing growing attention is the number of households that are falling into arrears with their Council Tax payments. The ordinary route for councils to chase unpaid debts is to apply to a magistrates' court for a liability order. If a liability order is granted, the council can undertake enforcement action. In 2014–15, the court and administration costs in relation to Council Tax debt increased by 17%. Council tax arrears have also been identified as one form of problem debt that may interact with broader financial pressures associated with housing insecurity and risk of homelessness.

=== Collecting authorities ===
The collecting authorities are the councils of the districts of England, principal areas of Wales and council areas of Scotland, i.e. the lowest tier of local government aside from parishes and communities.

=== Precepting authorities ===
The precepting authorities are councils from other levels of local government such as county or parish councils and other agencies. In metropolitan counties where there is no county council, the joint boards are precepting authorities. There may be precepting authorities for special purposes that cover an area as small as a few streets or as large as an entire county.

Precepting authority type	Examples
Strategic authorities	Greater London Authority, English county councils, combined authorities
Joint boards	Passenger transport executives, police authorities, fire authorities
Public-owned utilities	Scottish Water
Lowest-tier authorities	Parish councils in England, parish meetings
Special purpose authorities	Garden squares, national park authorities

These all set their precepts independently. Each of the levying authorities sets a precept (total amount) to be collected for households in their area. This is then divided by the number of nominal Band D properties in the authority's area (county, district, national park, etc.) to reach the Band D amount.

=== Liability for Council Tax ===
In general terms: The occupiers of a property are liable, regardless of tenure, or the owners if the property is unoccupied, except if the property is a house in multiple occupation, in which case the landlord is liable for paying the Council Tax.

== Calculation ==
Each dwelling is allocated to one of eight bands coded by letters A to H (A to I in Wales) on the basis of its assumed capital value (as at 1 April 1991 in England and Scotland, 1 April 2003 in Wales). Newly constructed properties are also assigned a nominal 1991 (2003 for Wales) value.

Each local authority sets a tax rate expressed as the annual levy on a Band D property inhabited by two liable adults. This decision automatically sets the amounts levied on all types of households and dwellings. The nominal Band D property total is calculated by adding together the number of properties in each band and multiplying by the band ratio. So 100 Band D properties will count as 100 nominal Band D properties, whereas 100 Band C properties will count as 89 nominal Band D properties. Each collecting authority then adds together the Band D amounts for their area (or subdivisions of their area in the case, for example, of civil parish council precepts) to reach a total Band D Council Tax bill.

To calculate the Council Tax for a particular property, a ratio is then applied. A Band D property will pay the full amount, whereas a Band H property will pay twice that. Note there is no upper limit for band H. This means that in reality, someone who lives in a multimillion-pound mansion will pay three times more than someone in a bedsit, which falls into Band A.

=== Revaluation ===
As of May 2024, the most recent full Council Tax revaluation was carried out in Wales in 2003. Full revaluations have yet to occur in England and Scotland; those jurisdictions still use the original 1991 valuations as the basis of their Council Tax systems.

The government had planned to revalue all properties in England in 2007, which would have been the first revaluation since 1991, but in September 2005, it was announced that the revaluation in England would be postponed until "after the next election". At the same time, the terms of reference of the Lyons Inquiry were extended and the report date pushed out to December 2006 (subsequently extended to 2007).

In Wales, tax bills based on the property revaluations use 2003 prices issued in 2005. Because of the surge in house prices over the late 1990s and early 2000s, more than a third of properties in Wales found themselves in a band higher than under the 1991 valuation. Some properties were moved up three or even four bands with consequent large increases in the amount of Council Tax demanded. Some properties were moved into new Band I at the top of the price range. Only 8% of properties were moved down in bands. As of May 2024, the next full revaluation in Wales is planned for 2028.

However, a large shift of properties between bands will cause a shift in the allocation of the charge between bands, and the tax levied for each particular band will then drop, as the total amount collected will remain the same for each authority (see "calculation of amount" above).

Between the wholesale revaluations, a major change to a property (such as an extension, or some major blight causing loss of value) can trigger a revaluation to a new estimate of the value the property would have reached if sold in 1991. If such a change would result in an increase in value, then re-banding will only take effect when the property is sold or otherwise transferred.

=== Current bands ===
==== England ====
In England, the Council Tax bands are as follows:

Band	Value (relative to 1991 prices)	Ratio (Note: The ratio governs the relationship between the bands. For example, a Band B property will pay 78% of the charge set for a Band D property in the same area.)	Ratio as %	Average (Note: Based on average Band D rate as of 2018)
A	Up to £40,000	6/9	67%	£1,114
B	£40,001 to £52,000	7/9	78%	£1,300
C	£52,001 to £68,000	8/9	89%	£1,486
D	£68,001 to £88,000	9/9	100%	£1,671
E	£88,001 to £120,000	11/9	122%	£2,043
F	£120,001 to £160,000	13/9	144%	£2,414
G	£160,001 to £320,000	15/9	167%	£2,786
H	£320,001 and above	18/9	200%	£3,343

==== Wales ====
In Wales, the bands were re-set on 1 April 2005 by the then National Assembly for Wales, based on 2003 valuations. In addition to revising the band boundaries upwards, an extra band was added.

Band	Value (relative to 2003 prices)	Pre-2005 value (Note: Nominal value as at 1991)	Ratio	Ratio as %
A	Up to £44,000	Up to £30,000	6/9	67%
B	£44,001 to £65,000	Up to £39,000	7/9	78%
C	£65,001 to £91,000	Up to £51,000	8/9	89%
D	£91,001 to £123,000	Up to £66,000	9/9	100%
E	£123,001 to £162,000	Up to £90,000	11/9	122%
F	£162,001 to £223,000	Up to £120,000	13/9	144%
G	£223,001 to £324,000	Up to £240,000	15/9	167%
H	£324,001 to £424,000	£240,001 and above	18/9	200%
I	£424,001 and above		21/9	233%

==== Scotland ====
In Scotland, the current bands are

Band	Value (relative to 1991 prices)	Ratio	Ratio as % from April 2017
A	Up to £27,000	6/9	67%
B	£27,001 to £35,000	7/9	78%
C	£35,001 to £45,000	8/9	89%
D	£45,001 to £58,000	9/9	100%
E	£58,001 to £80,000	131/100	131%
F	£80,001 to £106,000	163/100	163%
G	£106,001 to £212,000	49/25	196%
H	£212,001 and above	49/20	245%

=== Rates ===
==== Geographic variation ====
Due to the different make-up of each council area, Council Tax rates can vary quite a bit between different local authorities. This is less noticeable in parts of the country like Scotland, where band D rates in 2011 varied from a low of £1,024 (in the Western Isles) to a high of £1,230 (in Aberdeen), but the effect can be more pronounced in parts of England. For example, the 2018 rates in London had this sort of distribution:

Council area	2018 band D rate	% of 2018 average
Westminster	£710.50	50%
Hammersmith & Fulham	£1,022.04	72%
Kensington & Chelsea	£1,139.41	80%
Lambeth	£1,386.27	98%
Average	£1,420.45	100%
Islington	£1,429.45	101%
Hounslow	£1,461.99	103%
Enfield	£1,555.40	110%
Croydon	£1,636.96	115%
Kingston-Upon-Thames	£1,771.69	125%

==== Variation over time ====
Under the Labour government of Tony Blair, average Council Tax rates rose dramatically above inflation.

The subsequent Coalition government made an effort to get councils to freeze Council Tax rates, gradually eroding the above inflation increases via ordinary inflation. This was achieved by offering councils large grants in return for freezing their Council Tax rate; for example, in some years these grants were equal to the amount that would have been gained by a 1% Council Tax rise.

In addition, the law has been changed, so that councils cannot increase Council Tax by an amount higher than a cap specified by the government (currently 3%), without holding a local referendum to approve the change; so far only one council has invoked such a referendum, but many have raised Council Tax as close to the cap as they can get without passing it (for example, by 2.99%). This limit, combined with falling grants from central government due to austerity policy, has led councils to have a real-terms cut in spending power of more than 10% in 2021–22 compared to 2009–10, which has inevitably led to service reductions and cuts.

Although local government policy is a devolved matter, the Barnett Formula leads the Scottish Government to acquire funding somewhat in accordance with central government priorities. Subsequently, by 2013, the Scottish Government froze Council Tax rates for the fourth time.

== Reductions ==
=== Exemptions ===
Some dwellings are automatically exempt from Council Tax liability; these are officially organised into a number of distinct classes. Most of these exemption classes only apply when the property is completely unoccupied; these are as follows:

Class	Description
B	Furnished dwellings owned by a charity (up to six months).
D	Where the previous occupant(s) have been imprisoned, except where they are imprisoned for non-payment of Council Tax.
E	Where the previous occupant(s) have moved into a hospital or care home, and the dwelling had been their sole or main residence.
F1	Where the previous occupant(s) have died (lasts for as long as it takes until F2 applies)
F2	Where the previous occupant(s) have died and their estate has been granted probate or letters of administration (up to 6 months - 50% of tax applies thereafter)
G	A dwelling where occupation is prohibited by law
H	Where the future occupant would be minister(s) of any religion.
I	Where the previous occupant(s) have moved elsewhere in order to receive personal care, and the dwelling had been their sole or main residence.
J	Where the previous occupant(s) have moved elsewhere in order to provide personal care to a 3rd party, and the dwelling had been their sole or main residence.
K	Where the owner is a student, who last lived in the dwelling as their main home.
L	Where the dwelling has been repossessed by a mortgage lender.
Q	Where the person who would ordinarily be liable is prevented from making use of the property, because it is with a trustee in bankruptcy.
R	An empty caravan pitch, or a boat mooring not in use.
T	A granny flat which, due to planning restrictions, cannot be let separately from other parts of the same single overall property.

The remaining exemption classes apply not only when the property is unoccupied, but also when certain categories of people are living there:

Class	Description
M	A hall of residence provided predominantly for the accommodation of students.
N	A dwelling which is occupied only by students, the foreign spouses of students, or school and college leavers.
O	Armed forces's accommodation.
P	A granny flat within a single overall property, within which at least one person who would otherwise be liable has a relevant association with a visiting force.
S	A dwelling where all occupants are aged under 18.
U	A dwelling occupied only by a person, or people, who is or are severely mentally impaired and who would otherwise be liable to pay Council Tax, or on exclusion of such occupants would be in exemption class N.
V	A dwelling in which at least one person who would otherwise be liable is a diplomat.
W	A granny flat occupied by a dependant relative of a person in another dwelling within the same single overall property.

Other classes existed historically and are no longer mandatory. Councils may still offer 100% discount; some discount or no discount at all at their discretion.

Class	Date abolished	Description
A	1 April 2013	Vacant dwellings where major repair works or structural alterations are required, underway or recently complete (up to twelve months).
C	1 April 2013	A vacant dwelling (i.e. empty and substantially unfurnished) (up to six months).

All persons normally resident in a property are counted for Council Tax liability. However, certain classes of person are treated as 'disregarded persons'. Such persons do not count towards occupancy. If a property is occupied entirely by disregarded persons then it is taxed as an empty property (50% discount) unless it otherwise qualifies for total exemption.

A person is disregarded if they are:

- aged 17 or under (but S above may apply).
- aged 18 and someone is entitled to draw child benefit for them.
- a school or college leaver aged under 20 who left after 30 April in any year (disregarded until 1 November in the same year even if employed and counts toward exemption N above).
- a full-time student on a qualifying course of education (but N above may apply).
- a foreign language assistant on the official British Council programme (but N above may apply as this counts as being a student).
- a spouse, partner or dependent of either of the above two classes who is not a British citizen and is prohibited from working or claiming benefit by the immigration rules (but N above may apply).
- a young person on a government training scheme or in certain kinds of apprenticeship.
- a prisoner or someone who has been detained for deportation or detained under the Mental Health Act.
- someone who is severely mentally impaired (but U above may apply).
- a long-term patient in a hospital or resident in a care home.
- living in a hostel which provides care or treatment because of old-age; physical or mental disability; past or present alcohol or drug dependence; past or present mental illness.
- living in a bail or probation hostel.
- a live-in carer (exemption J may apply to their original home).
- staying in a hostel or night shelter.
- a member of any religious community.
- a member of a visiting armed force.
- a dependent of a member of a visiting armed force.

=== Statutory discounts ===
==== Low occupancy ====
A fixed discount, currently set at 25%, is available when there are fewer than two residents; this is known as the Single Person Discount. Though it is often concluded that the full Council Tax charge must, therefore, be based on two or more adults being resident at a property, this is not strictly true.

Some people are automatically disregarded when counting the number of residents for this purpose, such as full-time students. The legislation also provides that, to count as a resident of a property, an individual should have the property as their sole or main residence; case law has established that no single test may be used to determine whether this condition is met.

As part of the National Fraud Initiative, every other year, the Audit Commission analyses metadata deriving from Council Tax accounts together with the full electoral register to produce lists of people it believes should be subjected to an investigation on the basis that there is a risk that a discount is being received when an adult who does not fail to be disregarded is actually resident in the dwelling.

==== Disabled occupancy ====
If a property has been adapted to meet the needs of a disabled occupant, then, after applying in writing, and provided the adaptations are of a certain extent, the property will be rebanded to the band immediately below its normal Council Tax band. If the property was in the lowest Council Tax band, it will be placed into a Band Z (the band below A).

=== Discretionary reductions ===
Under the Welfare Reform Act 2012, local councils were given powers to create new deduction rules for their Council Tax. As these rules replace the former statutory rebate schemes, the Act has also restricted the councils from increasing, by more than a certain amount, the net Council Tax bill for any individual who previously received a rebate.

Since 2013, explicit Council Tax discounts have been provided, now officially known as Council Tax Reduction schemes, though many councils market them to residents as Council Tax Support; the choice to market the rules as a tax cut, rather than a benefit, may be an ideological one..

Many local authorities choose to use similar or identical rules to the former statutory rebate schemes, while others took the opportunity to levy a small level of tax on people with low incomes. In particular people in receipt of the Guarantee Credit element of Pension Credit (or who would meet the same qualifying rules) must continue to receive a 100% discount (that is, a Council Tax bill of £0).

== Contributions in lieu of Council Tax ==
Service personnel of the British Armed Forces living in service provided accommodation are exempt from Council Tax under Class O of the Council Tax Order 1992. They instead pay Contributions in lieu of Council Tax (CILOCT), which are calculated nationally and do not vary by council area. This is because service personnel can benefit from services provided by the council in their area, so the Ministry of Defence pays a contribution to each council at the start of the financial year on behalf of its personnel. This contribution is based on the number of service personnel living in each council area. In common with Council Tax rules, single occupants who pay CILOCT are eligible for a 25% discount. Service personnel living in accommodation overseas are not liable for CILOCT.

== Former statutory rebates ==
Historically, a number of statutory Council Tax rebates existed. These were applied to the Council Tax account in advance of the bill being delivered to the claimant, effectively creating a discount. However, the schemes were administered by the local authority responsible for producing the relevant Council Tax bill. Though the funding was provided by central government, the Council Tax bill it rebated was paid to the local authority.

Originally using paper application forms, local authorities began to use a telephone-based application process, in the last few years of the rebate schemes. Under these latter application schemes, claimants would often contact the responsible central government department (for example, by making a benefit claim), who would then forward the details to the local authority.

=== Second Adult Rebate ===
Many individuals share their dwelling with members of separate households, who would ordinarily be expected to pay a share of the Council Tax bill. However, in some cases, it would not be reasonable to expect those other residents to be able to pay a full share; to assist individuals sharing with those residents, a rebate (Second Adult Rebate) was available, as follows:

- 25%, if each of the second adults are in receipt of one of
  - Income-Based Jobseekers Allowance, or
  - Income Support, or
  - Income-Related Employment and Support Allowance, or
  - Pension Credit
- otherwise, it is based on the combined gross weekly income of all the second adults:
  - 15%, if under £175
  - 7.5%, if between £175 and £227.99
  - nothing, if £228 or above

=== Council Tax Benefit ===
Council Tax Benefit was a means-tested rebate that potentially rebated 100% of a claimant's Council Tax bill. The rebate would be reduced by a fifth of any qualifying income above a certain level; benefits did not qualify for this calculation, but most other income did. In effect, Council Tax Benefit was a rebate for people with low incomes.

The claimant could not be awarded both Council Tax Benefit and Second Adult Rebate; only the higher of the two, in relation to the claimant's circumstances, would be awarded.

==== Non-dependant deductions ====
A non-dependant is a person that the claimant is sharing accommodation with but is not a member of their own household (that is, not a partner, dependant, etc.), such as lodgers or joint tenants. Since it would be reasonable to expect non-dependants to contribute towards the Council Tax bill, Council Tax Benefit was reduced so that it only covered the claimant's hypothetical portion of the Council Tax bill.

However, no reduction was imposed if the claimant or their partner needed substantial care; this qualification was met if, and only if, the claimant was:

- Registered blind, or
- In receipt of
  - the Care Component (any rate) of Disability Living Allowance, or
  - Severe Disablement Allowance, or
  - Exceptionally Severe Disablement Allowance

No contribution was expected from non-dependants who would themselves qualify for Council Tax benefit, were not counted towards the number of residents liable for Council Tax (for example, due to being a student), were normally resident elsewhere, or were not adults. But the remaining non-dependants were each hypothetically expected to contribute the following amounts:

- £2.30 if in part-time work, otherwise
- £2.30 if weekly income is under £178
- £4.60 if weekly income is between £178 and £305.99
- £5.80 if weekly income is between £306 and £381.99
- £6.95 if weekly income is over £382

Council Tax Benefit was therefore reduced by an amount equal to these hypothetically expected contributions.

== Surcharges ==
Beginning in the 2010s, the UK government (as regards England) and the devolved administrations in Scotland and Wales began introducing powers for Council Tax billing authorities in their respective jurisdictions to levy surcharges on properties in their areas classed as either 'long-term empty dwellings' or 'dwellings occupied periodically' (commonly known as second homes or holiday homes).

=== England ===
The Local Government Finance Act 2012 made provision for billing authorities in England to levy a surcharge of up to 50% on properties empty for at least two years. The Rating (Property in Common Occupation) and Council Tax (Empty Dwellings) Act 2018 introduced a tiered system of surcharges available to billing authorities, with the charge increasing proportionate to how long the property had been empty.

The Levelling-up and Regeneration Act 2023 (LURA) reduced the minimum empty period from two years to one year. LURA also introduced a surcharge of up to 100% for second homes in England.

=== Scotland ===
From 1 April 2013, billing authorities in Scotland were given the ability to levy a surcharge of up to 100% on homes empty for more than one year. This power was extended to second homes from 1 April 2024.

The 100% surcharge cap was removed effective 1 April 2026, enabling billing authorities in Scotland to levy a surcharge of any amount.

=== Wales ===
The Housing (Wales) Act 2014 made provision for billing authorities in Wales to levy a Council Tax surcharge of up to 100% on properties empty for more than one year or used as a second home. The Welsh Government subsequently increased the possible surcharge amount to 300%, applicable from 1 April 2023.

== Criticisms ==
Council tax has been criticised as regressive, as it is not based upon the occupants' ability to pay, and for placing a higher burden on lower earners. Therefore, income scaled alternatives have been proposed, such as the progressive "Scottish Service Tax" proposed by the Scottish Socialist Party, which is scaled into various tax rate bands depending on household income. In 2021, academics and thinktanks from across the political spectrum referred to council tax as a "wealth tax" on the poorer parts of Britain. The groups and academics stated that council tax needed reform based on homeowners' ability to pay. As part of a letter sent to then chancellor Rishi Sunak the groups stated that council tax put the "heaviest burden on the young, low-earners, and those living in less prosperous parts of the country, who typically reside in modest properties" and that it should be reformed.

=== London ===
A report from the Institute for Public Policy Research (IPPR), funded by Trust for London, called for significant reform of the Council Tax system in London. The report called for Council Tax to be devolved to London, for exemptions for second and empty homes to be brought to an end and for Council Tax to be replaced with a property tax which is proportional to the present-day value of homes.

=== Collection of unpaid tax ===
==== Scotland ====
In Scotland, criticism has been levied not so much at the principle of the tax, but at its debt collection arrangements: Council Tax debts can be pursued up to 40 years later (Note: Councils can issue a warrant up to 20 years after the tax was due, but have a further 20 years to collect the tax after the warrant is issued. Any part of the 20 years in which to issue the warrant that is remaining is not added to the 20 years in which the tax can be recovered.) – few people will have conserved their payment receipts for such a long time and as such are unable to prove that they paid. Under Scots law, it is the responsibility of the tax payer to prove that the tax has been paid, not for the council to prove that it has not.

John Wilson MSP presented an Enforcement of Local Tax Arrears (Scotland) Bill on 19 March 2010 in order to try to reduce this collection time from 20 to 5 years. Although Wilson's bill has not made any progress (as of August 2023), a Bill was introduced in the Scottish Parliament, the Community Charge Debt (Scotland) Bill, to stop Councils pursuing debts from the older Community Charge. The Bill received royal assent on 25 March 2015, and as detailed in section 1 of the Act, all Community Charge and associated liabilities were extinguished in Scotland as of 1 February 2015.

==== England and Wales ====
The ability to collect Council Tax debt, in line with other debts, expires six years after the amount became due unless a liability order has been granted by a magistrates' court. This six-year limit is specifically included in legislation via regulation 34(3) of the Council Tax (Administration and Enforcement) Regulations 1992. Once a liability order has been granted, then, unlike Scotland, there is no limit in legislation as to how long the Council Tax arrears remain outstanding. This allows a local authority to chase debts many years after the original liability order was granted. Councils can garnish wages, send bailiffs to seize property, and imprison people (Note: The power to imprison people for Council Tax non-payment now only applies in England; it formerly also applied in Wales, but was abolished in 2019.) for three months.

=== Allocation to wrong tax band ===
An edition of the current affairs programme Tonight with Trevor McDonald on 26 January 2007 investigated whether millions of homes had been placed in the wrong band in the original 1991 valuation. It was shown that the banding valuations were often done by 'second gear valuations'; in other words, valuations were often done by driving past homes and allocating bands via a cursory external valuation. The programme followed case studies of a system devised by the presenter Martin Lewis, published on his website in October 2006, who had received thousands back in back payments after appealing their band allocations. This "Council Tax Cashback" system was said to have the potential to reach millions and received widespread publicity, likely to encourage people to challenge the system. There had been no information published on how many have been successful in obtaining a reduced banding until 22 November 2008 when the Daily Telegraph, in a news article about the campaign by Martin Lewis, stated that in the past year 97,563 properties in England and Wales had been rebanded, with 69,695 of those down-graded.

== See also ==
- Local income tax
- Window tax
- Council Tax (New Valuation Lists for England) Act 2006
