= Severe mental impairment =

British legal term

Severe mental impairment is a term used in the law of the United Kingdom to define intellectual disability for various purposes.

The Mental Health Act 1983 used the term for the purpose of authorizing detention in hospital or guardianship.

The Council Tax legislation established by the Local Government Finance Act 1992 provided that people, who were severely mentally impaired, were disregarded for the purposes of the tax. To qualify a person has to be medically certified as having a permanent condition that affects their intelligence and/or social functioning and be eligible for (but not necessarily receiving) any one of the relevant Social Security benefits.

Under the Social Security Contributions and Benefits Act 1992, a person can qualify for the higher rate of mobility component of Disability Living Allowance if they get the highest rate care component of the allowance and are either severely mentally impaired, display severe behavioural problems or a combination of both. The Social Security (Disability Living Allowance) Regulations 1991 further define these terms. Since 2015 only children are eligible. All four conditions must be met:

- they are in a state of arrested development or incomplete physical development of the brain, which results in severe impairment of intelligence or social functioning;
- they exhibit disruptive behaviour which 'is extreme';
- they regularly require another person to intervene and physically restrain them to prevent them causing physical injury to themselves or another, or damage to property;
- their behaviour is so unpredictable that they require another person to be present and supervising them whenever they are physically conscious.

In decision CDLA/1427/2017, Upper Tribunal Judge Paula Gray outlined how this test should be applied. She stressed that all the relevant evidence must be considered together and not compartmentalized.
