= John Seamon =

American psychologist (born 1943)

John Seamon (born February 8, 1943) is an American psychologist who is Professor of Psychology Emeritus and Professor of Neuroscience and Behavior Emeritus at Wesleyan University. His research focuses on memory.

Seamon read for a BS at Columbia University (1966) and a doctorate at the University of Massachusetts, Amherst (1971). After postdoctoral work at New York University, he joined Wesleyan in 1972. He was awarded Emeritus status in 2013. His books include 1980's Memory & Cognition: An Introduction (Oxford University Press); the 1980 reader Human Memory: Contemporary Readings (Oxford University Press); 1992's Introduction to Psychology, co-written with D. T. Kendrick (Prentice Hall), the second edition of which was published in 1994; and 2015's Memory and Movies: What Films Can Teach Us About Memory (MIT Press).
