= Boris Mouravieff =

Russian historian, philosopher, writer and university professor

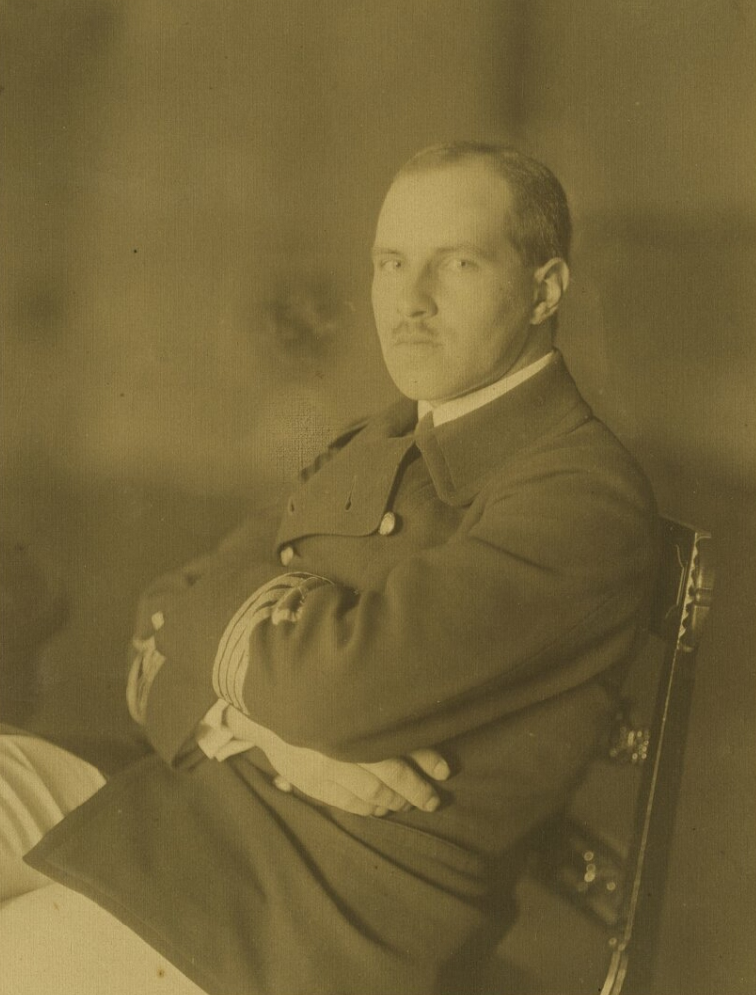
- Mouravieff in 1917
- Born: 8 March 1890; Kronstadt, Russian Empire
- Died: 2 September 1966 (aged 76); Geneva, Switzerland
- Writing career
- Notable works: Gnosis: Study and Commentaries on the Esoteric Tradition of Eastern Orthodoxy

Education
- Education: Graduate Institute of International and Development Studies

Philosophical work
- Main interests: Political and diplomatic history, Esoteric Christianity

Boris Petrovich Mouravieff (Russian language: Борис Муравьёв; 8 March 1890 – 2 September 1966) was a Russian historian, philosopher, writer and university professor. He is known for his three-volume work Gnosis: Study and Commentaries on the Esoteric Tradition of Eastern Orthodoxy.

== Biography ==
=== Early years: Russia ===
Boris Mouravieff was born in Kronstadt, Imperial Russia, on 8 March 1890. He was the second of three sons of Count Piotr Petrovitch Mouravieff. His father was an Admiral and Secretary of State to the Russian Imperial Navy. His ancestors included General Prince Nicolas Mouravieff-Karski, Andreï Mouraviov (the author A. N. Mouravieff), General Count Michel Mouravieff-Vilenski and General Count Nicolas Mouravieff-Amourski.

A commissioned officer of the Imperial Russian Naval Academy, Mouravieff rose through the ranks, in particular from 1909 to 1912 when he served aboard the Russian cruiser Aurora. The Aurora won fame in 1917, giving the signal for the start of the Bolshevik Revolution. During the First World War, he served in the Black Sea Fleet. Promoted to lieutenant commander in 1916, he commanded a flotilla of fast torpedo boats of which he had been the designer and the promoter.

In March 1917 at the age of 27, he was promoted to frigate captain, before being appointed Principal Private Secretary to Alexander Kerensky in the Russian Provisional Government, led by Prince Georgy Lvov. Following this he was appointed deputy chief of staff of the Black Sea fleet by Kerensky, who in turn became head of the Russian government until his overthrow by the Bolsheviks during the October Revolution of 1917. Shortly after the signing of Treaty of Brest-Litovsk in 1918, he left the military but remained in Crimea to devote himself to business interests, archaeological work as well as esoteric and historical research.

At the end of 1920, Mouravieff left Russia for Constantinople and in 1922 he moved again to Bulgaria until 1924.

From his youth, Mouravieff was interested in the esoteric tradition of the Eastern Orthodox Church, helped by indications left by Andreï Mouraviov (A.N. Mouravieff), his great-uncle (who died in 1874) and a founder of the Skete of Saint Andrew, one of the great Orthodox monasteries of Mount Athos. The latter had undertaken research in Egypt, Armenia, Kurdistan and even Persia to find traces of this tradition and manuscripts from the first centuries of our Common Era.

=== Exile ===
While in Constantinople between 1920 and 1921 Mouravieff attended public lectures given by P. D. Ouspensky and became acquainted with Gurdjieff, with whom he had contact in later years, both at Fontainebleau and in Paris. Mouravieff and Ouspensky became close friends and worked together either in Paris or London for many years most notably on the manuscript of In Search of the Miraculous. They met for the last time at Lyne Place Manor, near London, in May 1937. Mouravieff detailed the nature of his relationship with both Ouspensky and Gurdjieff in an article published by Synthèses in 1957 entitled Ouspensky, Gurdjieff and the Fragments of an Unknown Teaching.

=== In France ===
Mouravieff arrived in France as a refugee in 1924. He lived first in Paris, then moved to Bordeaux. In 1935, while in Bordeaux he met Larissa Bassof-Volkoff, born in 1901 in Tashkent, Uzbekistan. Larissa was a ballerina and had a child from her first marriage, Boris Vsevolod Volkoff, born in 1928 in Neuilly. Boris Mouravieff married her in 1936 and all three moved to Paris the same year. Up until 1941, Mouravieff worked as a consulting engineer for various oil companies, while devoting his free time to historical research, as well as to the esoteric tradition of Eastern Orthodoxy. Since 1921, Mouravieff had pursued his research into the political and diplomatic history of Russia, and in particular to Peter the Great, which gave rise to a number of articles and books. On June 11, 1940, Boris Mouravieff left Paris for Carry-le-Rouet in the South of France, where the firm that employed him had relocated. He then moved to Aix-en-Provence until July 1943, and finally to Haute-Savoie, Neuvecelle, above Evian. Refusing to collaborate with the Germans, he was arrested in early 1944 by the Gestapo, interned in Annemasse, then released under surveillance.

=== Switzerland ===
Fearing further arrest resistance fighters of the local French Gendarmerie organised his and his family's escape on March 9, 1944, for Switzerland. Received as refugees, Boris and Larissa Mouravieff were assigned accommodation in a refugee camp in Randa, Valais. At the end of the war, they were allowed to settle in Geneva and stayed at an establishment called "Home for Intellectual Refugees", while waiting for an apartment in town.

As a 55 year old refugee and having to start his life from scratch once again Mouravieff's financial situation was precarious. He earned a basic living giving lessons and making industrial translations. At the same time also, his wife opened the "Larissa Mouravieff Classical Dance School", which she ran for a quarter of a century. At the beginning, Boris Mouravieff participated by accompanying the lessons, on the piano. As early as April 1945, Mouravieff applied for enrolment as a student at the Graduate Institute of International Studies in Geneva. In 1951, he graduated from this institute for his work: "The Russian-Turkish Alliance in the Middle of the Napoleonic Wars".

Also during this time, he began to formalize his interest and knowledge in the esoteric Christian tradition of Eastern Orthodoxy. Initially he planned to present this doctrine in a novel. The results of this work can be seen in the unfinished manuscript: "Initiation - The life and dreams of Boris Kouratov").

=== Teaching ===
In April 1955, Mouravieff became a privat-docent at University of Geneva where he taught two courses until 1961, one concerning the history of Russia before 1917 and the other on esoteric philosophy. This last course was entitled: "An Introduction to esoteric philosophy according to the esoteric tradition of Eastern Orthodoxy". This course regularly brought together between ten and thirty students. The introductory speech of the 1956 academic year on the theme of "The Problem of the New Man" was published by the journal "Synthèses". Over the years at Geneva University, Mouravieff wrote a series of articles for the journal on similar themes.

The course Mouravieff taught at the University of Geneva served as the basis for his three volume work, "Gnôsis", the first volume of which was published in April 1961 by the editions "La Colombe" in Paris. The mastery and the clarity of the presentation were recognized and the work won the Victor-Émile Micheletesoteric literature prize the following year.

In 1961, Mouravieff set up the Centre for Esoteric Christian Studies (C.E.C.E.), based in Geneva, which he chaired and led until his death. Mouravieff's aim in setting up the C.E.C.E. was to contribute to the formation of the "New Man", a cultured and balanced individual, mature in both their emotional as well as intellectual capacities. He felt this need especially because he saw the years into the 21st century as a critical historical period, a "Transition period", between a cycle of history just ending and a new cycle, which bring both promise and opportunity but great danger at the same time.

Following the publication of volume I of "Gnôsis", Mouravieff received voluminous correspondence. As well as responding to people interested in "Gnôsis": he encouraged the creation of practical study groups. These were started in Geneva, Paris, Lille, Brussels, Cairo and the Congo amongst others. To inform the groups and coordinate their work, "Information Bulletins" were periodically published by the C.E.C.E. for members. In July 1964, he travelled to Greece to visit interested parties and a translation of "Gnôsis" in Greek was made following this trip. These groups, formed under the aegis of the C.E.C.E., aimed to deepen at a practical level the doctrine set out in Gnôsis.

In 1962, Boris Mouravieff retired from the University of Geneva to devote himself entirely to the activities of the C.E.C.E and to writing the final two volumes of Gnosis. Volume II appeared in 1962, volume III in 1965.

The last years of Mouravieff's life were devoted to teaching. He aimed to clarify, deepen and encourage the practical application of the teaching. General questions were answered through a series of writings entitled "A collection of notes on esoteric Christian teaching: The Stromata", in imitation of Clement of Alexandria. With these Stromates, grouped under the general title of "The Art of Winning", Boris Mouravieff embarked on a vast and ambitious project. The aim was to supplement the teaching given in "Gnôsis" with practical elements answering the questions that the study of doctrine raised amongst students. The first chapter appeared in 1966. Two other chapters were published posthumously.

=== Death ===
This intense activity affected Mouravieff's health. In March 1965, he had a heart attack which imposed a period of recuperation in Cannes. In June 1966, he was struck down by an attack of rheumatoid arthritis, accompanied by severe pain which forced him to remain in bed.

Boris Mouravieff died in Geneva of a heart attack on September 28, 1966, at 8.15 p.m., at the age of 76. He was buried at Saint-Georges cemetery, in Geneva.

The C.E.C.E. ceased operation shortly after the death of its founder.

== Posterity ==
Mouravieff's widow Larissa published chapters 2 and 3 of the first "Stromate" in 1968 and 1970 and maintained the archives of the centre until 1988, when she emigrated to join her son Boris Vsevolod Volkoff in Canada. Prior to her departure she deposited Mouravieff's archives with the Public and University Library of Geneva. Larissa Mouravieff died in Montreal on September 26, 1989, leaving her son the sole heir of rights. When the latter died, in March 2012, the remaining archives were handed over to the Library of Geneva (BGE, department of manuscripts), where a Mouravieff collection had been set up. This can be accessed by researchers who request it.

== Bibliography ==
Political and Diplomatic History (in French)

- L'histoire de Russie mal connue (épuisé).
- Le Testament de Pierre le Grand, légende et réalité, à la Baconnière, Collection « L'évolution du monde et des idées ». Neuchâtel, 1949.
- Le Problème de l'Autorité super-étatique, à la Baconnière, Collection « L'évolution du monde et des idées ». Neuchâtel, 1950.
- "L'Histoire a-t-elle un sens ?", « La Revue suisse d'Histoire », tome IV, fasc. 4, 1954.
- L'Alliance russo-turque au milieu des guerres napoléoniennes, à la Baconnière, Collection * L'évolution du monde et des idées, Neuchâtel, 1954. (Diplôme des Hautes Études Internationales).
- "Sainte-Sophie de Constantinople", Revue « Synthèses », no 167, Bruxelles, mai 1960.
- La Monarchie Russe, Payot, Paris, 1962.

Esoteric Christianity

- Gnosis, Book One, Exoteric Cycle: Study and Commentaries on the Esoteric Tradition of Eastern Orthodoxy
- Gnosis, Book Two, Mesoteric Cycle: Study and Commentaries on the Esoteric Tradition of Eastern Orthodoxy
- Gnosis, Book Three, Esoteric Cycle: Study and Commentaries on the Esoteric Tradition of Eastern Orthodoxy
- Ecrits sur Ouspensky, Gurdjieff et sur la Tradition ésotérique chrétienne, Dervy, Paris, 2008.
- Introduction à la Philosophie ésotérique d'après la Tradition de l'Orthodoxie orientale, éditions Arma Artis, La Bègue de Mazenc, 2008.
- Lumières sur Gnôsis, Recueil de correspondance et de textes inédits. La Quatrième Voie - La Cinquième Voie. Sélectionnés et présentés par l'Association Boris Mouravieff, LaBaconnière, Neuchatel, 2025, 452 p.

Writers referencing Gnosis and/or Boris Mouravieff

- Robin Amis, "Mouravieff and the Secret of the Source", in: Gnosis, magazine, n.20, été 1991.
- Robin Amis, A Different Christianity, New York, SUNY, Albany, 1995.
- Robin Amis, A Search for Esoteric Christianity, Devon, England, Praxis Institute Press, 1997.
- Christian Bouchet, Gurdjieff, coll. « Qui suis-je ? », Puisieux, Éditions Pardès, 2001.
- Antoine Faivre, in: Wouter Hanegraaff, Dictionary of Gnosis and Western Esotericism, Leyde, E.J. Brill, 2005, t. II.
- George Heart, Christianity : Dogmatic Faith & Gnostic Vivifying Knowledge, Canada, Trafford Publishing, 2005.
- Pascal Ide, Les neuf portes de l'âme - L'Ennéagramme, Montrouge, Sarment-Éditions du Jubilé, 2007.
- James Moore, Gurdjieff, Paris, Éditions du Seuil, 1999.
- Henry Normand, Symboles universels et traditions vivantes, Les grandes voies initiatiques, Paris, Editions Geuthner, 1997.
- William Patrick Patterson, Taking with the Left Hand, Enneagramm Craze, People of the Bookmark & the Mouravieff 'Phenomenon', Fairfax, California, Arete Communications Publishers, 1998.
- Richard Smoley, Conscious Love: Insights from Mystical Christianity, San Francisco, Jossey-Bass, 2008.
- Richard Smoley, Inner Christianity : A Guide to the Esoteric Tradition, Boston, Shambhala, 2002.
- Nicolas Tereshchenko, Gurdjieff et la quatrième voie, Paris, Guy Trédaniel Éditeur, 1991.
- «La voie de René Daumal, du Grand Jeu au Mont Analogue», Hermès, Bruxelles, N. 5, 1964–1967.
