= Delevoryas =

Delevoryas is a surname. Notable people with the surname include:

- Lillian Delevoryas (1932–2018), American artist
- Theodore Delevoryas (1929–2017), American paleobotanist
