= Summer soldier =

Summer soldier may refer to:

- Summer soldier, a term used in Thomas Paine's pamphlet The American Crisis.
- Summer Soldiers, a 1972 film by director Hiroshi Teshigahara
- Summer Soldier, a 1972 song by Barclay James Harvest from their album Baby James Harvest
- Summer Soldier, a 1972 song by Brave Belt from their album Brave Belt II
- The Summer Soldier, a 1978 novel by Nicholas Guild
