= Tricia Guild =

British designer

- Born: Patricia Denise Jeffreys; June 1946 (age 79); Marylebone, London, England
- Education: Royal College of Art; Winchester School of Art; Loughborough University
- Children: 1

Patricia Denise Guild OBE (born 1946) is a British designer and the founder and Creative Director of Designers Guild an international home and lifestyle company. She is known for her fabric and wallpaper collections and her work as a designer and manufacturer on a range of home interior products. She was awarded an OBE for services to interior design in 2008.

== Background ==
Born Patricia Denise Jeffreys (later Kaye) in Marylebone, Guild married her first husband Robin Guild (1939-2006) in 1969. Some of her earliest memories are of gardening with her grandfather and these images inspire her floral works and design, reminding her of that early sense of wonder. She has degrees from the Royal College of Art, Winchester School of Art and Loughborough University.

With Robin, Tricia Guild established Designers Guild, in 1970. The couple split in 1973, and she continued to run the company. By re-colouring a collection of Indian hand-block printed textiles, the first collection was established. She opened her store on the Kings Road, at the age of 22, with her first collection of fabrics, also selling ceramics and furniture. In 1974 she started working with artists such as Kaffe Fassett and Lillian Delevoryas among others. Since 1986, her brother Simon Jeffreys has been a business partner in the company and Chief Executive.

Throughout the 1990s Guild expanded her range as Designers Guild grew in the UK and overseas. The flagship store and showroom are on the Kings Road, London. In 1985 the company's turnover was £3.0m and in 2010 it had grown to over £50m with over 250 staff and offices and showrooms in London, Paris, Munich, Milan and New York. The company operates in over 80 countries.

Guild received an honorary degree from the Royal College of Art in 1993. She was given an OBE for services to interior design in 2008. Various of Designers' Guild textiles are held by the V&A.

Guild's second husband, the international restaurateur Richard Polo, died in 2019. They lived together in Notting Hill and also owned Le Contesse, a home near Cetona in the Chianti region of Tuscany from 1988. The property, set on four acres of their land, was featured in several of her books. Polo is survived by Polo and Guild's daughter and their grand-daughter.

== Honours and awards ==
- 1989 Textile Institute Gold Medal for her outstanding contribution to International Textiles, UK.
- 1991 Queen's Award for Export Achievement
- 1992 The Export Award for Smaller Businesses.
- 1993 Honorary Fellowship from the Royal College of Art, London, UK.
- 1993 Honorary Master of Arts Degree from Winchester School of Art, UK.
- 1994 A winner of the European Community Design Prize.
- 1995 'Excellence de la Maison' for Bedlinen, by Marie Claire Maison Magazine, France.
- 1996 Queens Award for Export Achievement (Second time to be awarded)
- 1999 Honorary Degree of Doctor of Technology, Loughborough University.
- 2007 The Homes & Gardens Classic Design Award – Lifetime achievement.
- 2008 Tricia Guild appointed an OBE for services to interior design.

== Books ==
- 1982 Soft Furnishings
- 1986 Designing with Flowers
- 1988 Design and Detail
- 1989 Design and Garden
- 1990 Tricia Guild New Soft Furnishing
- 1992 Tricia Guild on Colour
- 1994 Tricia Guild’s Painted Country
- 1996 Tricia Guild in Town
- 1998 Cut Flowers
- 1999 White Hot
- 2002 Think Pink
- 2004 Private View
- 2006 Pattern
- 2008 Flower Sense
- 2010 A Certain Style
- 2013 Colour Deconstructed
