= Richard Steven Street =

American photographer, historian and journalist

- Richard Steven Street photographing Stephen Pavich
- Born: San Rafael, California, United States
- Education: Ph.D.
- Alma mater: University of Wisconsin, Madison
- Occupations: Photographer, academic author, journalist, photographer. Farm labor activist.
- Years active: 1968-present
- Employer: Streetshots
- Known for: Scholarly work, journalism, and photography in the field of farm labor and agriculture

Richard Steven Street is an American photographer, historian and journalist of American farmworkers and agricultural issues. He is well known for his multi-volume history of California farmworkers and photo essays.

== Early life and education ==
Street was born to Oscar and Mary Street in San Rafael, California. In 1968, he received a bachelor's degree from the University of California, Berkeley. During his tenure there, Street studied history with Leon F. Litwack, whose lecture style and politics strongly shaped his values and writing. Street participated in the Free Speech Movement and the Delano grape strike. During 1968, Street worked in Senator Eugene McCarthy’s presidential campaign.

In the winter of 1969, Street entered the M.A. program in history at the University of California, Davis, where he studied with David Brody and Peter Kolchin. That summer, after completing the Officer Candidate School at Fort Benning, Georgia, Street used his military pay to finance his master's thesis on African-American workers in the American South during the 1880s. For six weeks, Street visited archives for his research, saving money by sleeping out in the back of his 1955 Chevrolet station wagon.

In fall of 1970, Street resigned his officer's commission and followed Kolchin to the University of Wisconsin, Madison to pursue his doctorate.

== Photographic career ==
=== Reporting on farm workers ===
While at the University of Wisconsin, Street made a brief trip back to California that would change his educational plans. Street had traveled to Arvin, California where he witnessed the mass arrests of farmworkers on strike at the Guimarra Vineyards. Street was outraged by what he thought was rough treatment of Marta Rodríguez, a 16 year-old striker. Thirty-five years later, Street tracked down Rodríguez for photographs and an interview.

Street decided to write his doctoral dissertation on migrant farm workers. To finance his research, Street began writing for Pacific Sun, a weekly newspaper in Marin County, California. Street titled his dissertation Into the Good Land: the Emergence of California Agriculture, 1850-1920. However, the dissertation was rejected by two members of the dissertation committee.

Outside of the university, Street's dissertation gained wide attention. Two weeks later, Street's manuscript received the James D. Phelan Award for literature from the San Francisco Foundation. It was also accepted for publication by W. W. Norton & Company. The historian Kevin Starr used the manuscript to write the agriculture section of his 'Americans and the California Dream series, then sent it to Oxford University Press for publication.

As part of an effort to learn photography, Street convinced Pacific Sun to give him a standing assignment to write feature stories and photograph the best photographers in Northern California. The series received a Pulitzer Prize nomination.

In 1979 Street launched Streetshots, an agricultural photography business. Street used the travel opportunities, contacts, income, and experiences to extend his original research and consult material in over 500 manuscript collections in 22 states, Spain, Mexico, Germany, and the U.S. Virgin Islands. In an interview, Street observed that, if boxed and stacked, his research material would fill every room in the average house, floor to ceiling, including the garage.

=== Photographic work ===
During his photographic career, Street worked for corporate magazines ranging from Forbes magazine and Fortune magazine to the U.S. Information Agency and the National Geographic. His corporate clients included Agtrol Chemicals, Buena Vista Winery, Gerawan Farming and California Rural Legal Assistance. Street became known for executing studio-lit photography in the field under difficult and/or dangerous conditions.

Street published journalism and photojournalism essays on organic farming, the U.C. Davis Department of Viticulture and Enology, the Mexico–United States border, Special Agricultural Workers Program (SAWS), undocumented workers, organic agriculture, winemaking, water, pesticides, immigrant communities, and the United Farm Workers union.

Street wrote a series of academic articles based on his farmworker research. He also condensed much of his scholarship for publication in general interest magazines. In his first book, Organizing for Our lives: New Voices from Rural Communities, Street integrated his photographs with interviews and prose to describe the experiences of six groups engaged in successful self-organizing campaigns.

== Academic career ==
Street turned in his doctoral dissertation in June 1995. Titled “We Are Not Slaves: A Narrative History of California Farmworkers, Formative Years, 1769-1869,” it described the emergence of the farmworker class. The dissertation was the first half of the first volume in Street’s multi-volume work.

In the fall of 1999, Street was named a Visiting Professor and Fellow in the Stanford University Humanities Center at Stanford University. In 2000, he was awarded a Guggenheim Fellowship.

In 2003, Street was appointed to the California Labor History Map Committee, where he wrote the entire farmworker section of a project that developed a web-based resource for studying the state’s working classes. During the fall of 2006, Street served as the Alisa Mellon Burns Senior Distinguished Visiting Fellow, National Gallery of Art, Center for the Advanced Study in Visual Arts.

In 2009, Street received the Howard Chapnick Award in photojournalism from the W. Eugene Smith Memorial Fund. From 2010 to 2011 Street was a visiting professor at the James Weldon Johnson Institute for Advanced Interdisciplinary Studies, Emory University.

== Research ==
Street’s research focuses on rural California, defined broadly to include everything from border and community studies to photography and the history of labor unions.

In 2004, Stanford University Press published the first two volumes of Street's history of California farmworkers. Beasts of the Field: A Narrative History of California Farmworkers, 1769–1913 started with the arrival of the Spanish padres in California and ended with the Wheatland hop riot in 1913. The second volume was Photographing Farmworkers in California. Reviewers praised the books for their accessible and engaged writing style, definitive research, and for the way they brought scholarly work to a general readership far beyond the academy.

The two history volumes won the Mark Lynton History Prize from the Nieman Foundation for Journalism and the Columbia University School of Journalism; the Golden Spur Award from the Western Writers of America; the Silver Medal from the Commonwealth Club of California; the Caroline Bancroft Award from the Denver Public Library; the Bay Area Book Reviewers Award for Best Nonfiction on the American West. Beasts of the Field was a finalist for the Los Angeles Times Book Prize for Best History Book of 2004.

In 2006 Street was asked to write about his life as a photographer/scholar. The resulting essay, published in Visual Communication as “The Photographer’s Double: The Photographer as Historian, the Historian as Photographer,” is now being expanded into a book about an academic gone astray and in the middle of the industry that is his special expertise. The University of Oklahoma Press was to publish this as Knife Fight City and Other Matters: An Independent Life Adrift in the California Agro-Industry at Millennium’s End. More than 100 of Street's black and white and color images amplify the text.

In 2008, Street published Had Cameras: Photography and Farmworkers in California, 1850-2000 (University of Minnesota Press). The third volume in California farm worker series, it also received his third Pulitzer Prize nomination. In the last four chapters Street switches from third-person to first-person and moves himself into the story as eye-witness to, and photographer of, the events he is chronicling.

In Delano Diary; The Visual Adventure and Social Documentary Work of Jon Lewis, Photographer of the Delano, California Grape Strike, 1966-1968 (University of Nebraska Press, 2009), Street presents the work of Jon Lewis, a young photojournalist who produced an insider’s view of the Delano grape strike between 1966 and 1968.

Subversive Images: Leonard Nadel’s Photo Essay on Braceros in 1956 (University of Nebraska Press, 2010), describes a powerful but unknown photographic project about the Braceros, Mexican farm laborers working temporarily in the United States.

In 2010 Street was to begin writing the final volume of his history of California farmworkers, We Are Not Slaves: A Narrative History of California Farmworkers, 1913-2013.

== Awards and honors ==
- 1979 – James D. Phelan Award of the San Francisco Foundation for Into the Good Land: The Emergence of California Agribusiness, 1850-1920
- 1983 – Pulitzer Prize nomination for stories on photographers and photography in California that appeared during 1982 in Pacific Sun.
- 1985 – Best Agricultural Reporting in California award of the Sigma Delta Chi Journalism Society for "Valley of the Shadow of Death," a photo essay in the San Diego Magazine.
- 1985 – Award of Merit of the American Association for State and Local History for discovering and preserving the heretofore unknown Kern County photographs of Carleton E. Watkins
- 1986 – Thomas Storke Award for International Journalism of the World Affairs Council of Northern California for "The Border", a photo essay of California farmers.
- 1989 – Lincoln Steffens Award for Investigative Journalism of the Sonoma Press Club for "The Big Fix", an essay which detailed the use of illegal chemicals to increase berry size in table grapes.
- 1992 – Agricultural Journalism Excellence Award of the University of Maryland, College of Journalism and the National Agricultural Library.*1992 – Lincoln Steffens Award for Investigative Journalism of the Sonoma Press Club for the essay, "Knife Fight City".
- 1992 – Pulitzer Prize nomination for "Knife Fight City."
- 1995 – Mayer Fellowship of the Huntington Library.
- 1999 – Carl Wheat Award for the best article published in the Southern California Quarterly for "The FBI’s Secret File on César Chávez".
- 2002 – finalist Harry Chapin World Hunger Awards for “Life in the Canyons: San Diego’s Immigrant Shantytown Community.”
- 2003 – Ansel Adams Fellow of the University of Arizona's Center for Creative Photography.
- 2004 – Andrew W. Mellon Fellowship at the Huntington Library.
- 2004 – Independent Research and Creative Work Award from the Charles Redd Center for Western Studies of Brigham Young University
- 2005 – Mark Lynton History Prize for Beasts of the Field: A Narrative History of California Farmworkers, 1769-1913.
- 2007 – Fellow of the National Endowment for the Humanities.
- 2007 – Wyeth Publication Grant of the College Art Association.
- 2008 – Best Labor History Article published in Labor History for "Poverty in the Valley of Plenty: The National Farm Labor Union, DiGiorgio Farms, and Suppression of Documentary Photography in California, 1947-66.”
- 2008 – Distinguished Achievement Award of the Center for Cultural Innovation

== Bibliography ==
=== Single-authored books ===
Organizing for Our Lives: New Voices from Rural Communities (New Sage Press/CRLA, 1991), text, interviews, and photographs. (ISBN 978-0-939165-18-6)

Beasts of the Field: A Narrative History of California Farmworkers, 1769-1913 (Stanford University Press, 2004). (ISBN 0-8047-3880-7)

Photographing Farmworkers in California (Stanford University Press, 2004). (ISBN 0-8047-4092-5)

Everyone Had Cameras: Photography and Farmworkers in California, 1850-2000 (University of Minnesota Press, 2008). (ISBN 978-0-8166-4967-9)

=== Selected solely-authored article ===
“The Last Time I Saw César,” History New Network, April 21, 2008, http://HNN.us

“Photographing from the bullpen on assignment, when César Chávez ended his fast at Forty Acres, August 21, 1988,” 77 Pacific Historical Review (Winter 2008), 151-153 (and photograph)

“Leonard Nadel’s Photo Essay on Bracero Laborers in California,” Center 27: Record of Activities and Research Reports, June 2006-May 2007, National Gallery of Art, Center for the Advanced Study in the Visual Arts (Wash., DC, 2007), 152-155.

“Poverty in the Valley of Plenty: The National Farm Labor Union, DiGiorgio Farms, and Suppression of Documentary Photography in California, 1947-66,” Labor History 48 (February 2007), 25-48.

“The Photographer’s Double: The Photographer as Historian, the Historian as Photographer,” Visual Communication Quarterly 13 (Spring 2006), 66-89

“Lange’s Antecedents: The Emergence of Social Documentary Photography of California’s Farmworkers,” Pacific Historical Review 75 (August 2006), 385-428.

“Everyone Had Cameras: Photographers, Photography, and the Farmworker Experience in California – A Photographic Essay,” California History 83 (Fall/Winter, 2005), 8-25.

“Photographing César’s Last Fast: A Personal Essay,” in Leroy Chatfield, ed., National Farmworker Documentation Project (Sacramento, 2004).

“Framing Farm Workers Through a Historian’s Lens,” The Chronicle of Higher Education, June 7, 2002, B13-15 reprinted in History News Network.

“Tattered Shirts and Ragged Pants: Accommodation, Protest, and the Coarse Culture of California Wheat Harvesters and Threshers, 1866-1900,” Pacific Historical Review 117 (December 1998), 136-166.

“The 1903 Oxnard Sugar Beet Strike: A New Ending,” Labor History 39 (May 1998), 193-99.

“The FBI’s Secret File on César Chávez,” Southern California Quarterly, 128 4 (Winter, 1996/97), 347-384.

“First Farmworkers, First Braceros: Baja California Field Hands and the Origins of Farm Labor Importation in California Agriculture, 1769-1790,” California History, 125, No. 4 (Winter, 1996–97), 306-21, 381-3.

=== Solely authored-magazine essays and photo essays ===
“Life in the Canyons: Photographs of San Diego’s Shantytowns Communities,” Labor's Heritage 11 (Winter 2001), 36-59.

“The Flying Mondavis,” Worth Magazine 7 (March 1998), 92-98

“Organic on a Grand Scale,” Harrowsmith 10 (December, 1994), 38-43.

“‘Something Better Than We Are:’ Latino Workers in California,” Culturefront 3 (Fall, 1994), 92-101.

“Knife Fight City,” West Magazine, San Jose Mercury News, (July 28, 1991), 8-13, 22-24.

“The True Believers,” West Magazine, San Jose Mercury News, (October 14, 1990), 8-13.

“The Clean Revolution,” California Magazine, (June, 1990), 66-75, 82-83, 86, 130-134.

“Agriculture’s Wild West Town,” California Farmer 272 (March 17, 1990), 14-16, 26.

“SAW's Edge,” California Farmer, 269 (October 15, 1988), 8-9, 37-39.

“The Big Fix,” California Farmer, 269 (September 3, 1988), 8-9, 13-15.

“Jack Be Nimble,” California Business, 4 (April, 1988), 32-40, 48-50.

“Mystery Achievement,” California Farmer, 266 (February 1, 1987), 8-9, 12-13.

“Maggio Strikes Back,” California Farmer, 265 (December 13, 1986), 6-7, 16-19.

“The Border,” California Farmer, 265 (September 6, 1986), 10-11, 36-39.

“The Grape Men of Davis,” Sacramento Magazine, 11 (October, 1985), 47-55.

“The Murder of Hugh Glenn,” Sacramento Magazine, 11 (July, 1985), 49-54.

“A Grape of Another Color,” Nation’s Business 42 (June 1985), 75R-76R.

“Gutting the Farm Labor Law,” The Nation, 240 (March 23, 1985), 330-332.

“Valley of the Shadow of Death,” San Diego Magazine, 37 (December, 1984), 220-229.

“Wheatland: Birth of the Farm Labor Movement,” Sacramento Magazine, 10 (December, 1984), 38-42, 63-66.

“California Images: Kern County in Photographic Reverie,” The Californians, 2 (January–February, 1984), 22-27.

“Hundreds of Watkins Glass Plates Found Discovered,” Museum of California, 7 (January–February, 1984), 4-7.

“The Case of the Purloined Photos,” (California Living, Sunday San Francisco Examiner), January 23, 1983), 5-9.

“The Lettuce Strike Story,” The Nation, 230 (January 19, 1980), 45-49.

“Smashing the United Farm Workers,” Pacific Sun, June 29, 1979, 5-11.

== Contributions to books ==
=== Photographs (short list) ===
“A Nation of Strangers,” in Points of Entry (San Diego, Museum of Photographic Arts, 1995), ed, by Arthur Ollman and Vicki Goldberg, photos, part of a traveling exhibition

Lights: Urban-Suburban Life in a Global Society (Oxford University Press, 1995), by E. Barbara Phillips, photos.

“Fresh Grapes in California and Arizona: Stephen Pavich and Sons,” case study, in National Research Council, National Academy of Science, Alternative Agriculture (Washington, D.C., 1989), 35-74, photos.

=== Essays (short list) ===
“The 'Battle of Salinas:’ San Francisco Bay Area Press Photographers and the Salinas lettuce strike of 1936,” in Peter Palmquist, ed., Photography in the West (Manhattan Kansas, Sunflower University Press, 1987), 41-52.

== Exhibitions ==
“Hard Realities,” La Peña Cultural center, Berkeley, California, December 5, 2008 – January 25, 2009

“Life and Labor in the Fields,” Pasadena Playhouse, April 29-June 8, 2008, accompanying the production of John Steinbeck’s Of Mice and Men

“César Chávez and Dolores Huerta,” Buehler Visitor’s Center, University of California, Davis, November 2004-January, 2005 Marin Artists Grantees. Group Exhibition February 13-March 27, 2002, Falkirk Cultural Center, San Rafael, California. Four pieces.

“Shooting Farm Workers.” Exhibition of 60 black and white and color photographs illustrating a historian’s quarter-century sojourn as an agricultural photographer in California, Thacher Gallery, University of San Francisco, Aug. 6 - Oct. 14, 2001

“Points of Entry” Contributing photographer, series of black and white photographs from the shantytown communities of North San Diego County, Museum of Photographic Arts, San Diego, California, 1995-1999. Traveling Exhibition.

“Organizing for Our Lives.” Exhibition of 25 black and white images, Arte Americas, Fresno, California, May–June, 1992

“Work and Workers.” Exhibition of 40 black and white and color images, The Darkroom, San Rafael, California. January 6–27, 1979.

=== About Richard Steven Street ===
Owen Lamb, “Photographer Exposes Life of Farm Workers,” Ross Valley Reporter (June 14, 2005).

Steve Zeitser, “Labor on the Job: Book Review Interview” (April 1, 2005), Labor Video Project, San Francisco

Louis Freedberg, “Images from the Field,” Editorial, San Francisco Chronicle, June 21, 2004.

Mark Arax, “Yesterday’s Seeds, Today’s Harvests, “Los Angeles Times Book Review, June 27, 2004, R6-8.

“Framing Farm Workers Through a Historian’s Lens,” The Chronicle of Higher Education (June 7, 2002), B13-16

“Organizing for Our Lives,” by Mark Lapin, Photo District News, January 1994, 84-86.

“Front Lines,” by Cheryl Romo, Sacramento Magazine, October 1985, 6.

“Toil and Hope,” Sacramento Bee, June 20, 1994
