= California Farmer =

American farm magazine

- Editor: Len Richardson
- Categories: agricultural
- Frequency: twice a month (except: monthly in July, August, and December)
- Circulation: approx. 55,000 (peak)
- Publisher: Jack T. Pickett
- Founded: 1854
- Final issue: April 2013
- Country: U.S.A.
- Based in: San Francisco
- Language: English

California Farmer (1854-2013) was the state of California's leading farm magazine for more than a century.

== History ==
California Farmer was founded in 1854 by Col. James LaFayette Warren, a British-born nurseryman and merchant who had come to California from Massachusetts in 1849 at the age of 44. Before turning publisher, he tried his hand at gold mining and took note of the scurvy that afflicted miners because of their bad diet. He set up a seed business in Sacramento and began taking an interest in the broader development of agriculture in his adopted state. This in turn led to the launch of California Farmer and Journal of Useful Sciences (as it was originally titled), the first agricultural journal on the west coast. Working with his son and business partner John Quincy Adams Warren, who was the magazine's editor, Warren aimed at a literate middle-class readership of farmers, some of whom had taken up farming after succeeding in other kinds of business elsewhere. Together the Warrens turned California Farmer into a magazine that ranked with such respected contemporary publications as American Agriculturist and Country Gentleman.

California Farmer outlasted many rival agricultural journals, several of which eventually merged with it, including The Rural Californian, Golden State Farmer, Livestock and Dairy Journal, Pacific Rural Press, and California Cultivator.

== Pacific Rural Press ==
Pacific Rural Press and California Cultivator were both long-running publications in their own right. Pacific Rural Press and California Fruit Bulletin was founded in 1871 by a pair of transplanted Massachusetts printers, Alfred T. Dewey and Warren B. Ewer, in order to promote California farming. Initially a weekly magazine (later a biweekly), it absorbed California Granger and several other magazines between 1875 and 1889. In 1875, the agronomist Edward J. Wickson (later dean of the University of California's College of Agriculture) became the magazine's editor, a position he held for 48 years. The magazine changed its name to Pacific Rural Press, then to Southern Pacific Rural Press (1937), and was folded into California Farmer in 1940.

One of the Pacific Rural Press's editors was John Pickett, whose son Jack T. Pickett was California Farmer's publisher for 34 years. After he died in 1988, the Jack T. Pickett Agricultural Scholarship was established in his name to support University of California, Davis, students interested in careers in agriculture.

== California Cultivator ==
California Cultivator, which began publication in 1889 as Poultry in California, became California Cultivator and Poultry Keeper (1892), and finally California Cultivator (1900). It subsequently merged with Rural Californian (1914), itself formerly known as Semi-Tropic California and Southern California Horticulturist (for just three issues in 1880) and before that as the Southern California Horticulturist (founded 1877). It ended publication in 1948 and merged with California Farmer.

== Areas of focus and controversy ==
By the 1980s, California Farmer was both the oldest and largest of the state's agricultural magazines, with a circulation in the mid 50,000s. It covered the entire range of subjects that affect agriculture, from plant and livestock breeding, integrated pest management and organic farming to water rights, urban expansion, and migrant workers. It reflected the interests of its readership of both large and small farmers, leading it to be perceived outside of agriculture as both traditional and conservative and its publisher, Jack T. Pickett, as a cheerleader for the agrichemical industry. Given the large scale of agriculture in California (a $42 billion industry as of 2012) and the long history of tensions between small farmers, agribusiness, and urbanites, its stories occasionally stirred controversy both within and outside its own readership. In the 1960s, the magazine came out against farm workers' efforts to establish a union under the leadership of Cesar Chavez, with Pickett vilifying the union organizers as "cold, hard, and brutal" men preaching "hate against the farmers".

In the 1980s, under the leadership of editor Len Richardson and managing editor Richard Smoley, the magazine became more moderate. It wrote about the harm done by the financial crisis to small farmers, and it ran a cover story on marijuana, already by then the state's unofficial number one cash crop (though not officially recognized as such until some years later). In the fall of 1988, the magazine published "The Big Fix" in which journalist and historian Richard Steven Street reported that some table grape growers were illegally using a growth-enhancing chemical known as 4-CPA on their vines, alongside an "unusually critical" editorial opposing the practice. The combination drew strong pushback from agribusiness, and in the wake of the uproar, managing editor Smoley resigned his post.

In 1996, the cover story "An Urban Central Valley?" by urban planner Rudy Platzek drew wide attention to the possibility that by the end of the 21st century the Central Valley might not even be able to feed its own rapidly expanding population (due to loss of acreage to new development), let alone the rest of the country.

California Farmer was published twice a month except in July, August, and December, when publication was monthly. Headquartered in San Francisco for most of its existence, the magazine went through a number of owners in its final decades, including Harcourt Brace Jovanovich (which acquired it in 1988) and Penton Media, California Farmer's publisher at the time of its demise. It published its final issue in April 2013, with Penton Media stating that the magazine wasn't as profitable as its other publications. It has been merged into Penton Media's Western Farm Press.
