= Richard Smoley =

American author and philosopher

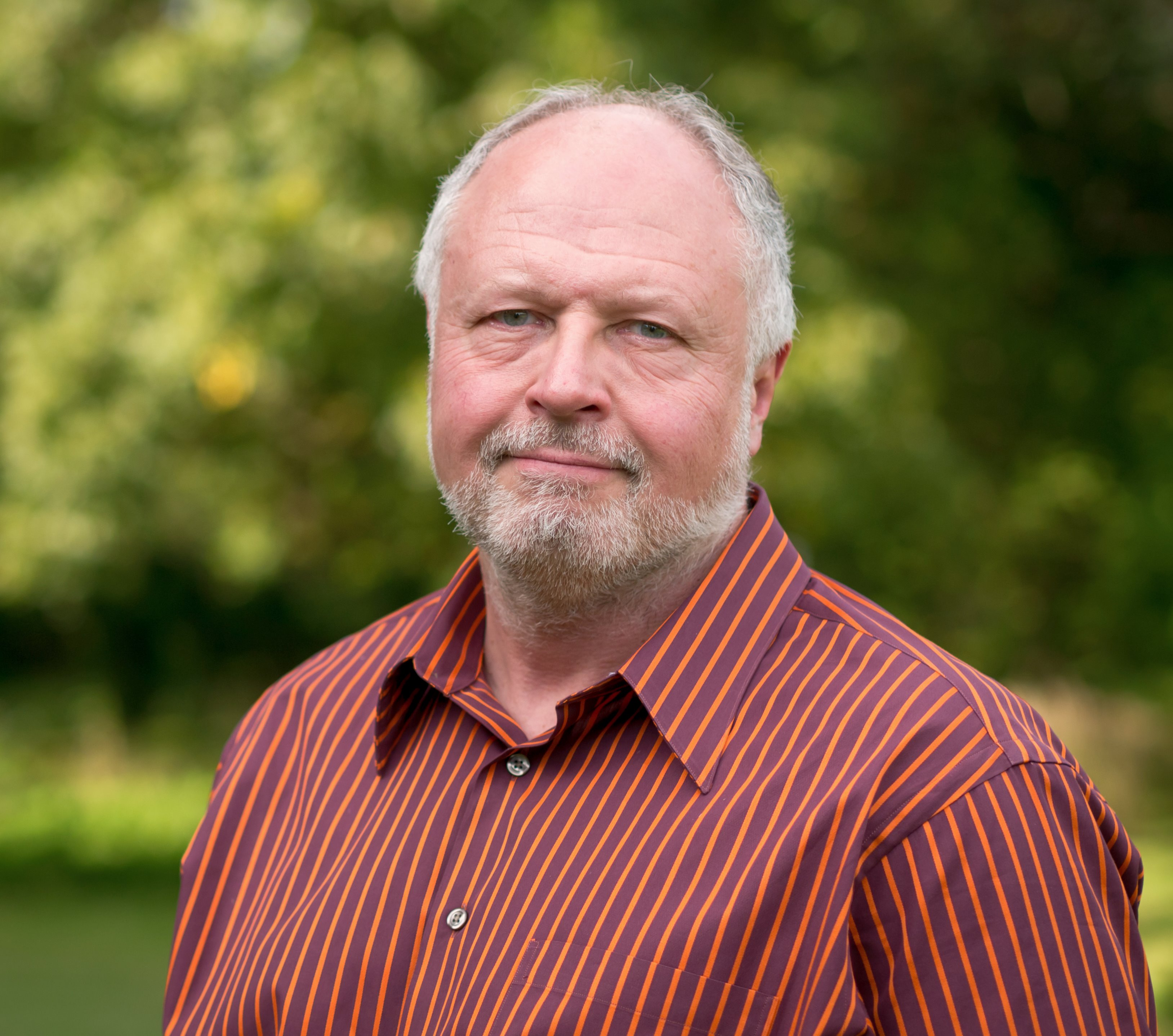
Richard Smoley

Richard Smoley is an author and philosopher focusing on the world's mystical and esoteric teachings, particularly those of Western civilization.

== Early life and education ==
Smoley was born in Waterbury, Connecticut, in 1956. He attended the Taft School in Watertown, Connecticut, and took a bachelor's degree magna cum laude in classics at Harvard University in 1978. Smoley went on to Oxford University, where in 1980, he received a second bachelor's degree from the Honour School of Literae Humaniores (in philosophy and classical literature). He received his M.A. from Oxford in 1985.

While Smoley was at Oxford, he came in contact with a small group that was studying the Kabbalah, co-founded by the British Kabbalist and author Warren Kenton (Z'ev ben Shimon Halevi). Smoley subsequently started Kabbalah groups along similar lines in San Francisco, New York, and Knoxville, Tennessee, which no longer meet. As of 2023, he no longer works with students or groups.

== Editorships ==
Smoley moved to San Francisco in 1980. In 1982 he began working for California Farmer magazine, the state's leading agricultural publication, and became managing editor in 1983. Smoley helped broaden the magazine's coverage to include controversial topics such as organic farming, and the California Farmer helped bring organic farming into the agricultural mainstream. Smoley left California Farmer in 1988.

In the 1980s and 1990s Smoley continued his spiritual investigations, working with Tibetan Buddhism, the teachings of G.I. Gurdjieff, and A Course in Miracles. He was also a member of the board of directors of the now-defunct San Francisco Miracles Foundation, an organization sponsoring the work of A Course in Miracles.

In 1986, Smoley started writing for a new magazine called Gnosis: A Journal of the Western Inner Traditions, founded in San Francisco by Jay Kinney. After four years of writing for Gnosis and a brief stint as managing editor, he came on board as editor in November 1990. In his eight years as editor of Gnosis, the magazine published issues on subjects as diverse as Gnosticism, Freemasonry, G.I. Gurdjieff, the spirituality of Russia, and psychedelics in spirituality. Smoley's interest in the Kabbalah influenced the magazine's coverage of that tradition. In 1998 Gnosis won Utne Reader's award for best spiritual coverage. In 1999, largely for financial reasons, Gnosis ceased publication.

Smoley then moved to Brooklyn, New York, where he worked as guest editor for Leonardo, the journal of the International Society for the Arts Sciences and Technology, and subsequently to western Massachusetts, where he served as managing editor for the Anthroposophic Press (later renamed SteinerBooks) in Great Barrington. He briefly taught philosophy on an adjunct basis at Holyoke Community College in Holyoke, Massachusetts.

From 2005 to 2015 Smoley worked as acquisitions editor for Quest Books, the publishing arm of the Theosophical Society in America. In 2008, he moved to the Chicago suburbs and became editor of Quest, the journal of the Theosophical Society in America, a post he continues to hold as of 2023.

Smoley is a consulting editor to Parabola. He has served as guest editor of Science of Mind magazine, and has served as a consultant for the New Century Edition of the works of Emanuel Swedenborg, sponsored by the Swedenborg Foundation in West Chester, Pennsylvania. He was on the board of directors of the Swedenborg Foundation from 2011 to 2019.

== Writings ==
Smoley's publishing career began when he was an undergraduate at Harvard. He served as managing editor of The Harvard Advocate, the university's literary magazine, in 1977, and published a full screenplay entitled Spleen and the Ideal in the Advocate. He also edited First Flowering: The Best of the Harvard Advocate, 1866-1976, a selection from the magazine that included undergraduate writings by figures such as T.S. Eliot, Wallace Stevens, e.e. cummings, and Arthur Schlesinger, Jr. The collection included a foreword by the novelist Norman Mailer and a preface by the translator Robert Fitzgerald.

At Oxford, Smoley helped revive the dormant magazine of Corpus Christi College, The Pelican, and published some short works in it.

In May 1999, Smoley's book Hidden Wisdom: A Guide to the Western Inner Traditions, coauthored with Jay Kinney, was published by Penguin Arkana. A revised edition was issued by Quest Books in 2006, and an audio version was released by Audible.com in 2013. Chapters cover Carl Jung, Gnosticism, the Kabbalah, ritual magic, shamanism, alchemy, G.I. Gurdjieff, Sufism, the Rosicrucians, the Freemasons, Theosophy, and the New Age. Gustav Niebuhr, writing in the New York Times, characterized the book as "a new wide-ranging book about alternative spiritual paths." In Whole Earth, Jeanne Carstensen commented that Hidden Wisdom displayed "both historical rigor and a wink toward the divine."

Smoley's second and best-known book, Inner Christianity: A Guide to the Esoteric Tradition, was published in 2002 by Shambhala Publications. An audio version read by the author was released by Berkshire Media Artists in 2003. In his introduction, Smoley says he was inspired to write this book because there were at that point no good introductions to the mystical and esoteric traditions of Christianity, a situation he attempted to remedy. Library Journal characterized the book as "a solid introduction to esoteric Christianity for the general reader." The magazine The Sun featured Smoley and his work in a lengthy interview in its September 2003 issue.

In January 2006, Tarcher/Penguin published The Essential Nostradamus, Smoley's guide to the enigmatic prophet Michel de Nostradamus. The book contains new translations of Nostradamus's key prophecies, as well as an evaluation of his work and of prophecy in general. A second edition of this work appeared in 2011.

In 2006, Harper San Francisco (now Harper One) published Smoley's book Forbidden Faith: The Gnostic Legacy from the Gospels to "The Da Vinci Code". A paperback edition, retitled Forbidden Faith: The Secret History of Gnosticism, appeared in 2007. In this book Smoley traces the history of Gnostic and other esoteric currents of Western civilization — including Manichaeism, Catharism, the Rosicrucian legacy, Freemasonry, Kabbalah, and Theosophy. It also explores how these currents have shaped modern trends and thinkers ranging from William Blake to Jung, and, in more recent times, Philip K. Dick and Harold Bloom.

Smoley's book Conscious Love: Insights from Mystical Christianity, was published in April 2008 by Jossey-Bass. His discussion of consciousness, causation, and the existence of God, The Dice Game of Shiva: How Consciousness Creates the Universe, was published by New World Library in November 2009. In a review of this book for Parabola, the magazine's executive editor, Tracy Cochran, wrote, "With clarity and verve, [Smoley] lays out famous arguments and articulations of the conundrum of the nature of consciousness so that they sparkle like jewels on the dark velvet of starlight."

Smoley's book Supernatural: Writings on an Unknown History, published by Tarcher/Penguin in 2013, is a collection of his essays on subjects including Atlantis, prophecy, Freemasonry, Nostradamus, hidden masters, and A Course in Miracles.

The Deal: A Guide to Radical and Complete Forgiveness, published by Tarcher/Penguin in 2015, is a guide to a process for self-liberation through releasing old grievances and grudges. Thomas Moore, author of Care of the Soul, commented that The Deal "covers just about every aspect of forgiveness. It's beautifully written, clear and practical."

In 2016, Smoley published How God Became God: What Scholars Are Really Saying about God and the Bible (published by Tarcher/Perigee), a discussion of current scholarship about the Bible and how much of it is literally true.

Smoley’s 2019 book A Theology of Love: Reimagining Christianity through ‘A Course in Miracles” (published by Inner Traditions) is written in two sections. The first uses sources including Gnosticism, the Kabbalah, Immanuel Kant, and C.G. Jung to explore the human predicament in terms of a deep loss of primal consciousness reminiscent of the Indian concept of maya. The second presents the teachings of A Course in Miracles as a remedy to this problem and as a path to a new Christian theology that discards old and self-contradictory dogmas.

Smoley’s 2022 book Introduction to the Occult (the first edition was published under the title The Truth about Magic in 2020) is an edited transcript of audio-video recordings of Smoley providing basic guidance on concepts that are widely discussed but often misunderstood, including magic, occultism, thought power, psychic powers, healing, ghosts, life after death, and psychedelic spirituality.

Smoley’s Seven Games of Life and How to Play (published in 2023 by G&D Media) can be seen as his entry into pop philosophy. Updating previous models such as Abraham Maslow’s hierarchy of values and Clare Graves’ Spiral Dynamics, he describes life as a series of games which everyone plays continually and concurrently: the games of survival, love, power, creativity, pleasure, and courage. To these, Smoley adds an optional “master game,” inspired by G.I. Gurdjieff and by Robert S. de Ropp’s 1968 book The Master Game, which entails waking from the slumber of ordinary life. Kirkus Reviews characterized Smoley’s book as “an eclectic, spicy smorgasbord of philosophical food for thought.”

Smoley lectures on his work throughout the United States and occasionally abroad. Videos of his lectures, many of them for the Theosophical Society in America, have been made available on YouTube. Organizations that have sponsored his lectures and workshops include the Bodhi Tree bookstore (West Hollywood), the California Institute of Integral Studies (San Francisco), East-West Books (New York), the Kabbalah Society (London), the Lumen Foundation (San Francisco), the New York Open Center, and the Swedenborg Foundation (West Chester, Pennsylvania).

Smoley highlights his literary background in a foreword and afterword to a 2021 edition of F. Scott Fitzgerald’s Great Gatsby, published by G&D Media.

== Thought ==
Smoley's books show a certain progression in that his earlier works, particularly Hidden Wisdom, are more descriptive of the ideas and teachings of others, notably those in the Western esoteric tradition, while his subsequent works, particularly Inner Christianity, Conscious Love, and The Dice Game of Shiva, A Theology of Love, and Seven Games of Life, are devoted to expounding his own views, which he associates to some extent with esoteric, or, as he styles it, "inner" Christianity (a term he credits to the late Robin Amis).

=== Esotericism ===
Smoley occupies a somewhat ambiguous position in regard to the academic study of esotericism, pioneered by François Secret and Antoine Faivre at the Sorbonne and developed by such figures as Wouter Hanegraaff, Joscelyn Godwin, Arthur Versluis, and Nicholas Goodrick-Clarke. On the one hand, Smoley has always shown high respect for the findings of academic scholarship in the field; on the other hand, he has also shown some concern that an overacademic approach will distort and devitalize the living esoteric tradition, of which he considers himself to be a part. In a 1993 editorial in Gnosis, he wrote:

Like Rappaccini's daughter, the professors' touch can prove poisonous. I have a degree in philosophy myself, so I have firsthand experience of how academic hairsplitting and pettifogging disputes over the meanings of words have all but killed that discipline. A glance into just about any theological treatise will leave one with the same impression. So I'm not sure that academic inquiry will really do justice to the spiritual traditions of the West, particularly since scholastics, from the time of Aquinas onward, have been notoriously bad at distinguishing intellectual knowledge from the deeper, experiential understanding called "gnosis." Even Gershom Scholem, the great scholar of Jewish mysticism, was nicknamed "the accountant" by kabbalists because they saw his knowledge as being merely of the intellectual kind.

Smoley elaborated on these comments in a 2006 address to the Association for the Study of Esotericism entitled "Academe and Esotericism: The Problem of Authority." In terms of the distinction between the emics, who consider themselves to be part of the culture in question, and the etics, such as anthropologists, who study the culture from an outside, ostensibly objective view, Smoley is an etically informed emic. His view of esotericism holds that it is not so much a matter of entering an inner circle of adepts but of going "further in" oneself in order to grasp deeper levels of consciousness. The various esoteric traditions would, then, serve as ways of making this journey within.

=== Consciousness ===
Smoley's metaphysics and epistemology are intricately intertwined. His approach can be described as partially phenomenological, although he does not appear to be directly influenced by 20th-century phenomenologists such as Edmund Husserl or Maurice Merleau-Ponty. He posits a fundamental dichotomy that underlies the rest of his thought: between the self and the other. His theory of consciousness rests on this polarity; in fact he defines consciousness as "that which relates self and other." In his 2009 work The Dice Game of Shiva, Smoley, drawing inspiration from the Hindu philosophical school known as the Samkhya, equates this self and other with the terms purusha and prakriti respectively.

Consciousness in this sense extends far past waking human awareness, which Smoley sees as only one level of a continuum that also includes the consciousness of other living beings as well as the inanimate world down to at least the atomic level. To this effect he quotes an 1890 interview in which Thomas Edison stated:

I do not believe that matter is inert, acted upon by an outside force. To me it seems that every atom is possessed by a certain amount of primitive intelligence. Look at the thousands of ways in which atoms of hydrogen combine with those of other elements, forming the most diverse substances. Do you mean to say that they do this without intelligence?. ... Gathered together in certain forms, the atoms constitute animals of the lower orders. Finally they combine in man, who represents the total intelligence of all the atoms.

In remarking on this statement, Smoley wrote, "If an atom could not take a stance in the physical world and draw a line between itself and what is not itself, it could not exist."

=== Human selfhood ===
Smoley characterizes human consciousness in terms of his contrast of self and other. In this case, however, he uses slightly different terminology. In Inner Christianity, he speaks of "I" and "the world." The "I," or "true I" (he uses both expressions), in his view, is not the ordinary ego but a deeper, transpersonal entity that simply sees or experiences. He explicitly equates this "I" with a number of concepts from the world's spiritual traditions. This true "I" — the consciousness that looks out at the world through each of us as through so many windows — has many names. Esoteric Christianity calls it the Son; the Logos; Sophia, or "wisdom"; or the kingdom of heaven. For the Hindus it is atman; the Dzogchen tradition of Tibetan Buddhism speaks of it as rigpa, "pure consciousness"; other Buddhists call it "Buddha nature or simply "mind." You can never see it, Smoley contends, because it is that which sees. Francis of Assisi alluded to this when he said, "What we are looking for is what is looking."

Over and against this "I," which is "that which experiences," Smoley posits that which "is experienced — whether inside ourselves or outside." This statement highlights one unusual aspect of Smoley's views. He claims that it is possible to step back and look at the contents of one's own psyche as if it belonged to a third party. In one meditative exercise that he gives, he says, "even your most intimate feelings and desires will pass before you like images on a screen." Thus for Smoley, even what is usually seen as the internal realm of the psyche is part of the "world" that is experienced.

Smoley relates these observations to the ancient Christian division of the body, soul, and spirit, which, he claims, has become obscured over the centuries. The body, that is, the physical body, constitutes one level. The psyche (which he explicitly equates with the soul, on the grounds that in most versions of the New Testament the Greek word translated as "soul" is psyche) is the total constellation of an individual's thoughts, images, and feelings, conscious and unconscious. The third element, the spirit, the "I" or "true I," as he puts it, "seems to have no power, no volition of its own, yet it is that in you which is constantly awake and experiences all that passes for your life."

Smoley claims that the sum total of experiences, physical and psychological, are what esoteric Christianity calls "the world." Thus he uses this term in a more precise sense than has generally been done. For Smoley, the Gospel of John in particular, with its frequent and emphatic contrast of "I" with "the world" (e.g., "Be of good cheer, for I have overcome the world"; John 16:33), is an exposition of this fundamental duality. This isolated "I" that does nothing other than cognize would seem to lead to a type of solipsism. Smoley counters this by another assertion: that this "I" is part of a larger, collective "I" that encompasses the whole human race. He connects this idea with number of esoteric themes, including the Sonship as envisaged by A Course in Miracles, the Kabbalistic concept of Adam Kadmon, the primordial human, and the maximus homo or "universal human" of the 18t-century Swedish visionary Emanuel Swedenborg. He quotes the French esotericist Papus (Gérard Encausse) to this effect: "Adam does not represent an individual man, but rather the sum total of all men and women in their ulterior differentiation."

In Smoley's "inner Christianity," "Adam" symbolizes the human entity in its fragmented, isolated state. As in many instances, Smoley discounts the literal meaning of the Bible in favor of an esoteric sense. The fall of Adam and Eve, he contends, was caused by the desire of this cosmic Adam to know good and evil (symbolized by eating of the tree of knowledge of good and evil: Genesis 2:17). Smoley quotes Papus again to the effect that after the fall, "each cell of Adam became an individual human being." But Smoley also emphasizes that this fall cannot be placed on a historical timeline, but was a cosmic event that preceded (and may have given rise to) the existence of the universe as we now know it. Because this fall would be an event that takes place outside the dimensions of space and time, Smoley's view neither conflicts nor concurs with contemporary scientific cosmologies.

According to Smoley, esoteric Christianity symbolizes humanity in its fallen state of individuality by Adam. The restored human unity, the reintegrated maximus homo, is symbolized by Christ: "For as in Adam all die, even so in Christ shall all be made alive" (1 Corinthians 15:22). He explicitly relates his views to conceptions of the cosmic Christ and the Catholic doctrine of the mystical body of Christ.

=== Theology ===
Smoley is not connected with any religious denomination. His theology parallels his dichotomy of "I" and "the world." Although he does not posit this dichotomy as absolute, contending that it arises out of a groundless being (or nonbeing) in which self and other are not distinguished, he insists that it is fundamental to the way we experience the world. While one may be able to transcend this duality through, say, mystical experience, it is very difficult to speak about, or conceptualize, this transcendence. He contends that this fact helps explain many of the apparently paradoxical or incomprehensible utterances of many mystics.

Smoley's view of God recapitulates this position. "God is both wholly Self and wholly other. To put it more comprehensively still, God is the ultimate source out of which this duality of self and other arises." He adds, "God is purusha, Self, that which sees; it is that which is most profoundly and intimately 'I.' God is also other, prakriti, the 'world,' that which is seen. How the divine is revealed is a matter, almost, of the stance from which we see it."

Because this "ultimate source" is infinite, it is unlikely to be personal in the sense that orthodox Christianity maintains. "If God is the ultimate ground of being out of which all arises, it must necessarily follow that God is not a person or persons as we customarily understand them." At the same time, Smoley contends, its very infinitude also includes the capacity to manifest in a personal form. "Whether or not God is ultimately personal in the sense that we humans understand it, the tradition suggests that we are persons, and God can address us in ways we can understand — that is, personally."

Smoley's view of the Christian Father and Son resembles the "subordinationist" view found in such figures as Philo of Alexandria and Origen. The Father is the transcendent aspect of God; the Son is the imminent aspect, which he equates with the Logos and Sophia, or the "primal level of consciousness," or the "true I." Smoley does not identify this principle with the historical Jesus in any kind of exclusive or privileged way: "This primal level of consciousness ... is the deepest part of us, as it is of everything that exists." His views here again correspond closely to the description of the Father and Son in A Course in Miracles.

=== Christology ===
Smoley's Christology must be understood in the light of these ideas. He appears to accept most current scholarship about the historical Jesus, which, beginning with David Friedrich Strauss in the 19th century, posits that much of what appears in the Gospels is mythical or legendary. Smoley's Christology thus departs radically from those of most Christian denominations, but he insists that the esoteric meaning of many Biblical texts has always been known within the esoteric Christian tradition. He concurs with Origen, who says, "In the gospels ... events which did not take place at all are woven into the records of what literally did happen."

Unlike Origen, however, and most other Christian sources, Smoley regards Jesus as no more divine than anyone else. He quotes A Course in Miracles (a text he cites frequently), which, speaking about Jesus, says, "Is he the Christ? O yes, along with you." In fact Smoley appears to accept the Christology of A Course in Miracles, which portrays Jesus as the figure who, through his crucifixion and particularly his resurrection, crucially reversed the fall of the cosmic "Adam," but only as a kind of first among equals in the human race.

=== Love ===
Smoley's views on love can be found in their most comprehensive form in his 2008 book Conscious Love. If consciousness is "that which relates self and other," then "love is what unites self and other."

Broadly speaking, Smoley defines two types of love. The first is "transactional love or worldly love," which is "calculated, calculating, and exact." Most forms of love in ordinary life, he contends, are transactional in this sense, even those we do not customarily regard as such. For example, "it seems unlikely that transactionality ever totally vanishes from romantic love, even at its most exalted."

In regard to sexual love, Smoley's views are comparatively open-minded and accepting. "Love is sometimes expressed in a bonding for life, sometimes in a brief affair, or occasionally even in a thing as transient as a one-night stand. Sometimes it is virginal, sometimes whorish. ... [H]uman love takes as many forms as imagination and feasibility will permit, and if it seems to break the rules on countless occasions, this only serves to remind us that rules are not gods."

The same is the case with his views on homosexuality. He writes: "On the one hand, if homosexuality is unnatural, why has it persisted for so long in the face of so much opposition? On the other hand, if homosexuality is natural, what purpose does it serve?. ... The most obvious conclusion is that homosexuality seems to fulfill some role in nature that is not well understood. For the time being, we would probably be best served neither by condemning it nor by cooking up factitious reasons for its existence." He then goes on to say, "From an ultimate perspective, there's probably nothing uniquely privileged about the union between man and woman."

While Smoley does not completely reject the popular idea of "soul mates" (which can be traced back to Plato's Symposium), he does display considerable skepticism about it. "What of the enormous numbers of people—single, divorced, or unhappily married—who have never found their soul mates? What of those of us who lead lives of serial monogamy? Or polyamory and polyfidelity? Or prostitution? (The ancients in Babylonia knew that there is a sacred element even to this most despised and downtrodden of all professions.) All these types of relationships exist, have always existed, and to all appearances will continue to exist."

In Conscious Love, Smoley goes on to characterize the transactional elements present in marriage, family love, and friendship. To all these he contrasts the Christian agape, unconditional or "conscious love," a phrase he has taken from the teachings of Gurdjieff. Agape, in Smoley's view, comes from a recognition of "the I that is we"—a realization that the true "I" of the individual is at core identical to the "I" of all other humans and indeed all other beings:

The "love of the world," with its accounts, transactions, and agendas, is the love of Adam in his fallen state, in which each cell of his body imagines that it is ... isolated and supreme and so finds itself fighting for position with so many other beings who deludedly believe the same thing. It is as if the cosmic Adam had been infected with an autoimmune disease.

Agape is the love of the cosmic Christ, in which each cell of Adam recognizes that it is joined to the larger whole, that what in it says "I" at the deepest level is identical to that which says "I" in everything else, human and nonhuman. Because this is the truth, to realize it is to achieve gnosis, to become conscious in the fullest sense. Hence "conscious love."

Smoley's contrast of "conscious love" with "transactional love" resembles the contrast between the "holy relationship" and the "special relationship" in A Course in Miracles. In Conscious Love, Smoley does not directly cite A Course in Miracles, a defect to which he himself draws attention in A Theology of Love, which both credits and explicates A Course in Miracles, which must be viewed as a central influence on Smoley’s thought.

=== Prophecy ===
Unlike many writers on esoteric subjects, Smoley shows considerable skepticism toward prophecy, writing that "prophecies of an imminent end have all failed over and over again for the last two millennia, so the soundest conclusion is that there is nothing in them."

In his book The Essential Nostradamus, Smoley attempts to root Nostradamus in his own context in 16th-century France. He contends, for example, that the mysterious figure Hister mentioned in Nostradamus's prophecies was not, as is often claimed, a prophecy of Adolf Hitler but a metonymy for the Austrian Empire of the time, on the grounds that Ister (modified by Nostradamus to "Hister") is an ancient name for the Danube, the principal river of Austria.

Smoley's general attitude toward his subject can be summed up thusly: "I would not base any of my future plans of expectations on anything Nostradamus predicted or is imagined to have predicted."

Elsewhere in the book Smoley discusses the larger dilemma faced by those who try to predict the future:

The scientific or quasi-scientific futurologist can base his forecasts only on the continuation of current trends. And yet if we know nothing else about the future, it is that current trends do not continue. There are disruptions, dislocations, surprises. The futurologist cannot foresee these.

The apocalyptic prophet faces no such restrictions. He has no incentive to predict more of the same; who would read him then? Consequently, he is entirely happy to foretell all kinds of upheavals, natural and supernatural—the submerging of continents, the manifestation of extraterrestrials, the shifting of the earth's pole, the return of Jesus Christ. In one sense, he too is right. Cataclysms do occur. But somehow they never occur in the way they were predicted.

In an afterword prepared for the second edition of The Essential Nostradamus, Smoley also shows skepticism about the then-current prophecies regarding 2012: "It seems ridiculous to me to single out specific dates." He does, however, add that expectations focused on individual years highlight a belief in, and need for, a collective awakening of the human race.

== Publications ==
=== Books in English ===
- Seven Games of Life and How to Play. G&D Media, 2023.
- Introduction to the Occult. G&D Media, 2022.
- A Theology of Love: Reimagining Christianity through “A Course in Miracles”. Inner Traditions, 2019.
- How God Became God: What Scholars Are Really Saying About God and the Bible. TarcherPerigee, June 2016.
- The Deal: A Guide to Radical and Complete Forgiveness. Tarcher/Penguin, 2015.
- Supernatural: Writings on an Unknown History. Tarcher/Penguin, 2013.
- Conscious Love: Insights from Mystical Christianity. San Francisco: Jossey-Bass, 2008.
- The Dice Game of Shiva: How Consciousness Creates the Universe. Novato, CA: New World Library, 2009.
- The Essential Nostradamus. New York: Tarcher/Penguin, 2006. 2d ed., Tarcher/Penguin, 2010.
- First Flowering: The Best of "The Harvard Advocate", 1866-1976. Reading, MA: Addison-Wesley, 1977. (Editor.)
- Forbidden Faith: The Gnostic Legacy from the Gospels to "The Da Vinci Code". San Francisco: Harper San Francisco, 2006. (Paperback edition released under the title Forbidden Faith: The Secret History of Gnosticism. Harper San Francisco, 2007.)
- Hidden Wisdom: A Guide to the Western Inner Traditions. New York: Penguin Arkana, 1999. 2d. ed. Wheaton, IL: Quest, 2006. (With Jay Kinney.)
- Inner Christianity: A Guide to the Esoteric Tradition. Boston: Shambhala, 2002.

=== Books in translation ===
- Gnosticismo, esoterismo e magia. São Paulo, Brazil: Madras, 2004. [Portuguese translation of Inner Christianity.]
- La saggezza segreta: Guida alle tradizioni interiori occidentali. Spigno Saturnia, Italy: Edizioni Crisalide, 2008. (With Jay Kinney.) [Italian translation of Hidden Wisdom.]
- Skritata myadrost: Pratevoditel v zanadnite dukhovni traditsii. Sofia, Bulgaria: Kibea, 2009. (With Jay Kinney.) [Bulgarian translation of Hidden Wisdom.]
- Sokrovennoe khristianstvo. Putevoditel' no ezotericheskoy traditsii. N.p., Russia: Sofia, 2005. [Russian translation of Inner Christianity.]
- Zakázaná viera: Tajné dejiny gnosticizmu. Bratislava, Slovakia: Slovart, 2008. [Slovak translation of Forbidden Faith.]

=== Articles and talks ===
- “Academe and Esotericism: The Problem of Authority”, n.d.
- “The Art of the Gene: Editor’s Introduction”, Leonardo 33:2 (October 2000).
- "Love and Money", Parabola 35:1 (Spring 2010), 40–45.
