= Gnosis (magazine) =

Magazine of Western esoteric traditions

- #26 cover (art by Alex Grey)
- Editor: Richard Smoley (1990-99)
- Editor in chief: Jay Kinney (1985-99)
- Categories: Western esoteric tradition
- Frequency: Quarterly
- Circulation: 16,000 (peak)
- Publisher: Jay Kinney
- First issue: 1985
- Final issue Number: 1999; 51
- Company: Lumen Foundation
- Country: United States
- Based in: San Francisco
- Language: English
- Website: www.gnosismagazine.com
- ISSN: 0894-6159

Gnosis was an American magazine published from 1985 to 1999 devoted to the study of Western esotericism. It was described by scholar David G. Robertson as "a leading publication in what they termed 'the esoteric spiritual traditions of the West'".

Gnosis was published by the Lumen Foundation, a San Francisco-based non-profit organization incorporated in California by Jay Kinney and Dixie Tracy-Kinney to produce educational material, including a print magazine, on the Western esoteric tradition. Initial fund-raising resulted in a 5,000-copy print run of the first issue. The first issues were produced on a volunteer basis from a home office, but within three years the Lumen Foundation and Gnosis established permanent headquarters near Mission Dolores in San Francisco. In 1986, the writer Richard Smoley began contributing to the magazine and went on to become its managing editor (briefly) and then, beginning in 1990, its editor for eight years.

By 1990, Gnosis counted a circulation of 11,000 and went on to achieve a peak circulation of 16,000. During its run, Gnosis published interviews with Gilles Quispel, Jocelyn Godwin, and Stephan Hoeller. Each issue usually included reviews of a dozen current books on topics of interest to Gnosis readers.

Although it was written for a general readership, Wouter Hanegraaff, professor of history of hermetic philosophy and related currents at the University of Amsterdam, has observed that it "contributed considerably to the setting of academic standards in a field where university chairs or curricula devoted to Western esotericism were still absent, and which at the time [in the 1980s and 1990s] was still dominated by sensationalism and plain ignorance."

The art director of issues 26 and 27 was Tony Lane.

In 1998 Gnosis won Utne Reader's Alternative Press Award for "best spiritual coverage". In 1999, largely for financial reasons, Gnosis ceased publication. In 2019, the Lumen Foundation was dissolved and remaining assets were donated to the Theosophical Society in America.
