= Salinas lettuce strike of 1936 =

1936 strike in Salinas Valley, California, U.S.

The 1936 Salinas Lettuce Strike was a strike involving lettuce shed workers. It began on September 1, 1936, after negotiations for a new agreement collapsed between the Fruit and Vegetable Workers Union No. 18211 (F&VWU) and the Grower-Shipper Vegetable Association of Central California (GSVA). The central issues were the union's demands for preferential hiring of union members and recognizing the union as the representative of lettuce shed workers (trimmers and packers) in the Salinas-Watsonville District.

The union sought preferential hiring for union members due to the employer blacklisting lettuce shed workers who had gone on strike during the 1935 Imperial Valley Lettuce Strike. The 1935 strike was caused by demands for better pay and working conditions, in line with terms agreed to during the Industrial Relations Board's (IRB) settlement of a labor dispute in Salinas in October 1934.

== Salinas Industrial Relations Board (1934) ==
On March 5, 1934, the Monterey County, California Board of Supervisors, with the support of growers and shippers, adopted an anti-picketing ordinance to head off a labor strike in Salinas. There was suspicion that the proposed strike would be heavily influenced by Communists, and it would likely turn violent and endanger the public if not kept off the streets of Salinas.

However, the Vegetable Packers Association (VPA) was affiliated with the American Federation of Labor (AFL). It was not a communist-led union and in reality had an ardently anti-communist stance. The Central Labor Council of Monterey County packed the Board of Supervisors' April 2, 1934 meeting to demand that the ordinance be rescinded. After hearing the arguments for and against the ordinance, the Board formed an Industrial Relations Board (IRB) to mediate disputes between labor and employers.

The IRB produced its binding agreement on October 8, 1934. The agreement included several provisions to improve pay and working conditions, resolving the workers' grievances and thus effectively ending the proposed strike. It also established a mechanism for settling future labor disputes and eliminated the need for the anti-picketing ordinance.

== 1935 Imperial Valley Lettuce strike ==
In 1935, 1,200 of the valley's lettuce shed workers were members of the VPA. The union asserted that it represented a majority of the workers, whose bargaining interests were controlled by the Western Growers Protective Association (WGPA). However, the growers and shippers refused to recognize the union or bargain over its terms, alleging that it was communist and led by radicals.

Union members voted to strike on February 12, 1935. Five days later, with a federal conciliator on site to help mediate the dispute, deputized civilians opened fire on pickets at the lettuce shed barricade. Kenneth Hamaker and Paul Knight, two of the strikers, were killed. An estimated 500 rounds were fired from the barricade before the shooting ended minutes later.

== Imperial Valley strikebreakers in Salinas ==
Lettuce workers traditionally followed the crop, meaning that when the season ended in one location, they would travel to work a crop that was in season. The lettuce growing season in Salinas was eight months long, so lettuce workers would often settle in Salinas and migrate for temporary work in places like the Salt River Valley near Phoenix and the Imperial Valley near El Centro.

When the violence of the 1935 Imperial Valley Lettuce Strike ended the season for striking workers, many returned to the Salinas Valley for the season that would begin in late April. Along with the Imperial Valley strikers, however, came Imperial Valley strikebreakers, whom the strikers considered complicit in the murder of Hamaker and Knight. The workers—both union and non-union—resented the idea of working shoulder to shoulder with the strikebreakers, particularly since Imperial Valley strikers who had worked in the past in Salinas found themselves suddenly displaced from their jobs by the strikebreakers. The workers viewed this as retaliation for their union activity, which they considered protected. However, employers believed that shed workers were "agricultural workers" who were not covered by federal worker protections. That meant striking, particularly when violence was involved, was a disciplinary matter within their discretion as employers.

When the practice continued in the spring of 1936, protests grew, centering primarily on the Ice-Kist and J. A. Simmons lettuce packing sheds in Salinas. On May 4, 1936, workers at the Simmons shed warned that they would strike the next day unless management agreed to a list of demands. At the top of their list of demands was the dismissal of four men they called "gun-toters" and "Imperial Valley scabs," whom they accused of serving as strikebreakers during the Imperial Valley strikes in 1934 and 1935. They also objected to the company's method of calculating work hours, arguing that it violated their 1935 contract. They alleged that Simmons was splitting shifts, working several hours, taking a break, and then continuing their workday, thereby exceeding the eight-hour workday and the requirement for an eight-hour break between workdays.

The following morning, union financial secretary A. S. Doss arrived at the Simmons shed to deliver the workers' demands in person. When Simmons rejected them, the crew immediately walked off the job and began picketing the premises. With 30 trailers of lettuce awaiting packing, Simmons tried to avoid losses by sending the produce to other sheds. Some of it was sent to the Ice-Kist Packing Company, but the Simmons pickets followed. Doss then instructed the Ice-Kist workers to refuse to handle the lettuce. Of the 75 to 80 employees there, all but 16 to 18 joined the walkout. The lettuce was sent back to the Simmons shed. Efforts to have it packed elsewhere failed. Both sheds stayed shut for eight days.

Eventually, Simmons relented and fired six Imperial Valley strikebreakers. However, Art Sbrana, owner of the Ice-Kist shed, refused the workers' demand that he terminate six Imperial Valley strikebreakers and place another eleven on the first-to-be-laid-off list.

Finally, the GSVA proposed that the two sides air their positions at a public forum at the high school auditorium on May 14, 1936, thinking that public support for them would force the union to capitulate. The union agreed to appear at the forum. After addresses by union president Mickey Shevlin and secretary Doss, the shippers agreed to mediate the issue. Shevlin and Doss had been persuasive in describing to the public their frustration in getting GSVA to settle differences through the grievance process over the course of the previous year and suggesting that the reason the shippers were stalling resolution of the strikebreaker dispute was so they could delay the harvest and drive up the market price of lettuce at the growers' expense. Within days of the forum, Ice-Kist agreed to the union's demands.

== Formation of the Citizens' Association and the Associated Farmers of Monterey County ==
The Simmons/Ice-Kist affair showed the GSVA that public support in controversies with the union was essential. On May 28, 1936, the group decided to hire a public relations expert, Cruse Carriel, to handle its media communications. He was referred to the GSVA by the advertising firm, Lord & Thomas. Around the same time that Carriel arrived on the scene, a new organization—the Citizens' Association—was formed in close coordination with the GSVA. Several members of the GSVA were heavily involved in forming the Citizens' Association, which initially met in the GSVA offices. GSVA secretary Charles S. Brooks played a significant role in organizing the Citizens' Association. According to Brooks, the purpose of the Citizens' Association was "to have an organization that could act as a mouthpiece for the sentiment of the town people," because "many outfits were having labor trouble at that time."

In reality, the Citizens' Association was created to serve as a mouthpiece for the GSVA. In fact, the GSVA became a member of the Citizens' Association and took out individual membership on behalf of its members. Then, within two weeks of being hired by the GSVA, Cruse Carriel was appointed executive director of the Citizens' Association. The GSVA did not fill the public relations vacancy after Carriel departed. When the union later threatened to strike, the GSVA and the Citizens' Association collaborated on a unified anti-strike public relations campaign.

The GSVA also hired shipper Henry Strobel to "cement the membership" and tighten relations between the growers and the shippers. Strobel had been the founding president of the GSVA. The following day, Strobel assisted in organizing—and became president—of the Monterey County chapter of the Associated Farmers.

According to its president at the time, Colonel Walter E. Garrison, The Associated Farmers was created to help farmers organize to protect themselves against field workers organizing. Under his leadership, the Associated Farmers sought to enact legislation to limit public relief for strikers. He asked members to send him pictures of labor leaders and "radicals", and that he would "see they were handled." He said that the organization had an effective system of undercover agents working in the union and that they had been successful in helping defeat strikes elsewhere in California. At an Associated Farmers membership meeting at which Monterey County sheriff Carl H. Abbott was a guest, Strobel offered members' services to serve as deputies in the event of a labor disturbance.

== Red Scare tactics ==
Allegations that organized labor strikes were communist-led or inspired were common in the 1930s, some of them justified. The infamous 1933 Cotton Strike in the San Joaquin Valley, led by the Cannery and Agricultural Workers Industrial Union (CAWIU), was an example. Strikes led by American Federation of Labor-affiliated unions like the Vegetable Packers Association in the 1935 Imperial Valley Lettuce Strike and the Fruit & Vegetable Workers Union in the 1936 Salinas Lettuce Strike were not. Claims by their adversaries that they were communist-led were part of the campaign to build a case for preemptive government action—law enforcement reinforcements, deputized citizens, munitions, anti-picketing ordinances—and to win public support for anti-strike forces.

While the GSVA, the Citizens' Association, and Colonel Henry R. Sanborn persisted in claims about a Communist threat, the Communists waged their own campaign against union leaders. Finally, a bulletin published by the Monterey Communist Party warned strikers to "Beware of the sell-out." It was an attempt to undermine union leadership by convincing strikers that the union would make a backroom deal at their expense. When it became apparent to the union leaders that Communists were in the Salinas area and had infiltrated the ranks of the strikers, Shevlin and Doss each led twenty-man groups to raid Communist strongholds in Salinas, pull their propaganda out into the street, and set it on fire.

The raid encouraged the Communists to run candidates for office against Shevlin and Doss. However, once votes were tallied, Shevlin and Doss were reelected by a two-to-one margin.

== Role of lieutenant Colonel Henry R. Sanborn ==
Lieutenant Colonel Henry R. Sanborn, a reserve U.S. Army officer, arrived in Salinas to serve as the Citizens' Association's coordinator of law enforcement, although not in an official military capacity. He was the publisher of a paper whose focus was on fighting radical and subversive elements, and he had been involved in strikebreaking in other locations, including the warehouse strike at the C&H Sugar Company in Crockett, near San Francisco. While in Salinas, he worked under the assumed name, Henry Winter.

He arrived in Salinas on September 13, 1936, and quickly went to work establishing a command post on the sixth floor of the Jeffery Hotel on Main Street. He quickly assembled a general staff of mostly local people to handle logistics, intelligence, and administration. The sheriff, chief of police, highway patrol, and public officials all maintained offices in Sanborn's established command post alongside him and his staff. From the Jeffrey Hotel, Sanborn issued regular reports of communist activity to the press and to California Governor Frank Merriam himself. The reports included information that indicated that Communists were pouring into Salinas by the truckload, that some 3,000 longshoremen from San Francisco were en route to Salinas "to mop up the town," and that red flags had been placed throughout the strike area to indicate marshaling areas and the dates that communists would use them. None of these reports were true. The red flags Sanborn claimed were communist were real, but they had been placed along roadways by the state highway department to help count traffic.

The presence of communist protestors was likely related to Sanborn, though there if a fair bit of information available stating that the majority of the protesters were told to stay back by their unions. There is a moderate degree of misinformation present regarding the nature of the protestors due to their political positions.

== Strike negotiations ==
The dispute over the Imperial Valley strikebreakers was resolved, but union concerns remained regarding workers' protection against discrimination for union activity.

The union maintained that the National Labor Relations Act of 1935 (NLRA) shielded workers from discrimination. However, the GSVA maintained that the act did not apply to agricultural workers. They considered lettuce shed workers agricultural workers, while the union considered them industrial workers.

Numerous efforts to craft language in the preferential hiring clause that would satisfy GSVA concerns all failed. The GSVA held to its position that any provision that included the words "preferential hiring" or "preferential employment" for union members was unacceptable.

The disputed provision stipulated that "when obtainable", union members would be hired first. The shippers equated the provision with a "closed shop," which refers to a union-only workplace. The position held was that even if the provision was not a "closed shop," it was the next best thing.

The union held that since the GSVA continued to insist that shed workers weren't protected by the NLRA, its protections would—and had—been disregarded by the GSVA. Even if the GSVA acknowledged its applicability to shed workers, the National Labor Relations Board's resolution of complaints would be ineffective, since findings and corrective actions would not be finalized for years.

July 27, 1936 – The GSVA sent a letter to the union saying that they were ready to begin negotiations for a new contract to replace the one that was due to expire on September 1.

August 6, 1936 – The first negotiations meeting was held. The union offered its proposal: Paragraph 7 - Provided for recognition of the union as the collective bargaining representative for all workers employed in the fruit and vegetable industry. Paragraph 37 - Provided that "when obtainable all workers employed in and around packing sheds must be members in good standing of the Fruit and Vegetable Workers' Union."

August 11, 1936 – Seventy-two firms, including some that weren't members, signed a binding power of attorney authorizing the GSVA to represent them in negotiations with the union.

August 12, 1936 – The GSVA and the union agreed that any reports to the press would be issued in writing and approved by both parties. The GSVA also reported that its membership had rejected, "on account of it being too long," the union's proposal. The GSVA proposed that the union work with the GSVA to revise the existing contract rather than create a new one. The union refused, saying that its members had authorized them to bargain only over an entirely new agreement. The union asked the GSVA to work on its own proposal.

August 18, 1936 – The GSVA presented its proposal, which was, to a large extent, the same as the existing agreement, except that the paragraphs were rearranged. It included no terms for recognition of the union, preferential hiring, or wage increases.

August 19, 1936 – Despite agreeing not to issue releases to the press without mutual agreement, the GSVA published the texts of both parties' proposed contracts to the press.

August 25, 1936 – The union reported to the GSVA that its members voted to reject the GSVA's proposal and had directed union negotiators to negotiate relative to the proposal it submitted on August 6 only. Union members emphasized their demand for a preferential hiring clause and equal pay for men and women.

August 26, 1936 – When negotiations resumed the following day, the bulk of the discussion related to the demand for a preferential hiring clause. The GSVA reiterated that the preferential hiring clause was unacceptable to its membership. Since no date was set for additional meetings, it began to look as though no agreement would be reached by the September 1 deadline. The union announced to the GSVA that if no new agreement were reached by the deadline, its members would continue working without a contract.

August 27, 1936 – The GSVA general membership met and decided to have secretary Charles Brooks prepare a notice to be placed on shed bulletin boards stating that the contract terms proposed by the GSVA on August 18 would apply to any workers who worked beginning on September 4, and would remain in effect until September 1, 1937.

August 28, 1936 – The GSVA posted a full-page advertisement in the Salinas Index-Journal:

"WORKERS: THINK!

Read this Ad-Study the Agreement

Did You Have a Chance to VOTE ON IT?"

The body of the advertisement included the text:

"...representatives of the Union reported to our group that they would not even discuss our proposal. They ended negotiations, saying that full discussion of their own proposal would be futile, unless the Grower-Shippers first agreed to paragraph No. 37..."

The most significant section of the advertisement, however, read:

"You who make up the sane, conservative, straight-thinking group, for your own sakes, do this:

SET UP YOUR OWN LEADERSHIP AND COMMITTEES. DEMAND THAT YOUR ORGANIZATION FOLLOW THE DICTATES OF THE MAJORITY. REFUSE TO BE DOMINATED BY A RADICAL MINORITY, WHOSE "ORDERS" CERTAINLY DON'T COME FROM YOU. DEMAND THAT YOU BE GIVEN AN OPPORTUNITY TO CONSIDER ALL IMPORTANT PROBLEMS. AND MOST IMPORTANT, DEMAND THAT YOU BE GIVEN THE AMERICAN OPPORTUNITY OF THE SECRET BALLOT WHEN PASSING ON SUCH PROBLEMS.

LET'S NOT ALLOW THESE SHEDS TO SHUT DOWN WITH CONSEQUENT UNEMPLOYMENT, BITTERNESS, AND INESTIMABLE FINANCIAL LOSS TO WORKERS, EMPLOYERS, AND THE SALINAS-WATSONVILLE DISTRICT.

Let's Let Well Enough Alone."

August 31, 1936 – The Union contacted the GSVA and arranged for another bargaining meeting to be held the following day. September 1, 1936 - The GSVA published an advertisement in the Salinas Morning Post and the Salinas Index-Journal titled, "Notice to Workers in The Lettuce Industry." The notice was a reproduction of the notice that the GSVA intended to post in lettuce packing sheds, adopted at its August 27 meeting.

Whereas the Fruit and Vegetable Workers Union, No. 18211, affiliated with the American Federation of Labor, has failed to negotiate or ratify an agreement for the ensuing year covering wage scale and working conditions:

Beginning September 1st, 1936, the following wage scale and working conditions will prevail. Any work performed on September 1st, 2nd, and 3rd shall not obligate the worker to continue to work under such wage scale and working conditions.

HOWEVER, ANY WORK PERFORMED UNDER SAID WORKING CONDITIONS AND/OR WAGES ACCEPTED FOR WORK PERFORMED ON OR AFTER SEPTEMBER 4, 1936, SHALL BE CONSTRUED BY BOTH THE WORKER AND THE UNDERSIGNED AS THE ACCEPTANCE OF SAID WORKING CONDITIONS AND WAGE SCALE FOR THE PERIOD COMMENCING SEPTEMBER 4TH, 1936, AND ENDING AUGUST 31ST, 1937, AND SHALL BE BINDING ON THE SAID WORKER AND THE UNDERSIGNED FOR SAID PERIOD.

Should the undersigned and the Fruit and Vegetable Workers' Union, Number 18211, enter into an agreement pertaining to the matters contained herein, this agreement shall thereafter become ineffective.

The two parties met again on the evening of September 1, from 9:00 pm to 5:00 am on September 2. During the meeting, the Union offered a new draft of its proposed agreement. It was, for the most part, a rearrangement of its first proposal. The number of items was reduced from 52 to 36. The Union recognition clause was moved up to paragraph 1, and the preferential employment clause was moved up to paragraph 2. Most of the discussion was spent on the new paragraph 2. Finally, both parties agreed to submit the revised language to their membership.

September 2, 1936 – The two sides met again on the evening of September 2. The GSVA representatives reported that its general membership had rejected the revised preferential hiring clause. The GSVA offered another proposal based on the existing agreement, incorporating some of the Union's demands. However, it not only failed to provide for Union recognition but also limited the Union's representation to its members only, not all workers. The GSVA suggested that its proposal be printed and distributed to workers. The Union objected to the GSVA distributing them. However, the Union agreed to distribute copies itself at a meeting of its membership the following day. The GSVA agreed not to distribute the documents and agreed with Union secretary Alfred Doss that they would not "ballyhoo" the agreement to the employees. The meeting ended without a plan for further meetings.

September 3, 1936 – Late in the afternoon, 2,500 printed copies of the Association's most recent proposal were delivered to Union secretary Alfred Doss at the union office by a messenger. Doss rejected the delivery, claiming that the GSVA had broken its agreement not to distribute copies or "ballyhoo" the proposal to shed workers. That evening, the Salinas local and the Watsonville sublocal met to consider the GSVA's posted notices and its most recent proposal. Members rejected the GSVA's proposal, primarily because it failed to recognize the union as the representative of all shed workers. The union and its members considered the notices an ultimatum. By an overwhelming vote in both locations, members decided not to work, beginning the following day, September 4, because doing so would constitute entering into individual agreements with the GSVA.

September 4, 1936 – At midnight, union secretary Alfred Doss notified the GSVA of the union members' decision and announced that the union was on strike.

Once the strike began, several efforts were made to reach an agreement between the union and the GSVA. The first attempt was September 11, when representatives of the union, the American Federation of Labor, and the GSVA discussed the preferential hiring clause further. The GSVA held to its position that it would never accept that provision. As the meeting ended, GSVA president Art Sbrana said, "All propositions are off with reference to collective bargaining." This statement appears, however, to have been made in the heat of temper. When the union informed the GSVA that its members had again voted not to withdraw its demand for preferential hiring, the GSVA changed its tune and responded, "We wish to repeat our statements in former communications that we are still willing to negotiate on an agreement."

Subsequent negotiations, however, were carried out through third parties. Of these, the only negotiations that need to be mentioned for purposes of this case are those conducted between Vandeleur, secretary of the State Federation of Labor, and representatives of the Citizens' Association. At meetings shortly before October 21, these parties reached a tentative agreement to be submitted to the Grower-Shipper Association and the union.

== Strike ==
When the strike began on September 4, 1936, the shippers shut down all lettuce packing sheds and remained closed until September 15.

September 5 or 6, 1936 – Law enforcement officers met with GSVA representatives to discuss security for the resumption of packing operations. Salinas Police Chief George Griffin proposed building a stockade around the packing sheds. He also recommended appointing a single person to coordinate the law enforcement efforts of the various agencies, including the Salinas Police Department, the Monterey Sheriff's Department, and the California Highway Patrol.

September 13, 1936 – Sanborn, arrived in Salinas on this day to serve as coordinator of law enforcement. His strategy for shed security was that forces gathered at the barricade not use force until the strikers became violent.

September 14, 1936 – The stockade around the lettuce packing sheds was completed in time for the planned resumption of operations using strikebreakers the following day.

September 15, 1936 – When the first lettuce trucks arrived at the sheds from the fields with loads of lettuce, they did so without guards. The police, however, waited behind the barricade. A crowd of approximately 2,000 strikers, sympathizers, and onlookers gathered at the barricade gate. As the trucks appeared at the gate, rocks were thrown at one or two of the trucks. Chief Griffin warned the crowd to disperse. Then, after waiting about ten minutes, he ordered a gas attack. Ten officers, four of whom were carrying riot gas guns while the others carried gas grenades, emerged from behind the barricade to clear the crowd from the picket line.

Subsequent truck caravans were accompanied by California Highway Patrol cars. Rock throwing continued.

September 16, 1936 – Early in the morning, groups of pickets walked east on East Gabilan toward the barricade. The first group consisted of approximately 50 picketers. No trucks had yet approached the barricade, and no violence or threat of violence came from the picketers. Police were at their posts at the barricade gate. A motion picture crew was positioned at the gate with their equipment as well, apparently anticipating action shots.

Then, without warning, when the picketers closed to within approximately 75 feet, the officers suddenly opened fire with gas guns. The gas forced the crowd back toward Main Street, five blocks west of the barricade. With picketers regrouping on Main Street, a convoy of lettuce trucks appeared on Main Street rather than along the usual truck route. At the intersection of Gabilan and Main Streets, a beet truck in front of the convoy stopped at a traffic light. When the convoy stopped behind it, picketers ran out into the street and cut the ropes holding the field crates off the trucks and onto the street, smearing lettuce along it.

Then, a group of about fifty deputized citizens wearing pale blue armbands came running up East Gabilan Street toward Main Street in military-style formation, armed with clubs, axe handles, and shotguns. At the head of the group, carrying a club in his right hand and a pistol holstered on his left hip, was Henry Strobel. Strobel's platoon held its formation as it reached Main Street near where the lettuce had been dumped from the trucks. The strikers in the street and along the sidewalks on Main Street leered at them as Strobel's group closed in. Then, a deputy fired his gun in the air to disperse the strikers. Still, instead of retreating, the strikers began moving toward the approaching platoon until the two groups broke ranks and charged into each other; Strobel's group swinging their clubs and axe handles freely as the strikers shielded their heads and waded into them, kicking and flailing with punches. The melee quickly broke into a hand-to-hand battle between the two groups. Combatants on both sides were knocked to the ground, although most were able to get back up and resume the battle. Some had to make their way or be helped off the street to safety.

Law enforcement responded with another series of gas attacks. Gas bombing resumed all along Gabilan from the barricade to Main Street. Groups of as few as two or three were attacked without provocation. At one point, strikers were chased on side streets along Gabilan from both directions. One attack occurred on Pajaro Street, where Union offices were situated. When strikers sought refuge in the Labor Temple, gas bombs were hurled inside. The gassing continued throughout the day.

After the attacks on the 16th, the union ordered its members off the picket line. In ordering pickets off the streets, union secretary Alfred Doss warned that the streets of Salinas were about to become "an all-out murder trap."

September 17, 1936 – Monterey County Sheriff and Mayor Edmund Leach issued proclamations calling for all non-disabled citizens between the ages of 18 and 45 to report for duty as citizen deputies. When they reported, they were issued clubs and the distinctive blue armbands of the citizen militia that had already been assembled.

November 3, 1936 – After sixty-one days, the strike finally drew to an end without resolution. However, the union took up the fight in a different venue when it filed charges against the GSVA and certain shippers with the National Labor Relations Board.

== National Labor Relations Board findings ==
On October 13, 1936, union secretary Doss, acting on the union's behalf, filed charges with the National Labor Relations Board. On January 8, 1937, the union filed additional charges.

On April 12, 1937, Judge Charles N. Feidelson, regional NLRB director in Birmingham, Alabama, convened the hearing to consider the complaints. The hearing lasted for six weeks until May 18, 1937.

One of the first items of business was Feidelson's ruling on the GSVA's motion to dismiss the charges, holding that the National Labor Relations Act did not cover lettuce shed workers. The GSVA had contended all along that lettuce shed workers were not protected under the Act because it considered them "agricultural workers." In fact, they had made that contention throughout the bargaining process, which provided them the basis for rejecting workers' fundamental rights to representation by the union of their choosing, recognition of the union, and worker protection against discrimination and blacklisting, the latter of which motivated the Union to seek the preferential hiring clause in the first place. Judge Feidelson ruled that shed workers were covered under the Act.

The hearing featured dramatic appearances and heated exchanges. Colonel Sanborn made a conspicuous entrance, while Alfred Doss gave detailed testimony. NLRB counsel Edises clashed with GSVA secretary Charles S. Brooks and Salinas Police Chief George Griffin gave unsettling testimony about law enforcement conduct during the strike. In another incident, Union attorney Richard Gladstein directly accused California Federation of Labor secretary Edwin Vickers of betraying the local union and its members. Others weaved a story about the events leading to, during, and after the strike that shook Salinas.

On Tuesday, May 17, 1937, the hearings finally concluded. The transcripts, evidence, and Feidelson's report were sent to the NLRB's headquarters in Washington, D.C. Later, once Feidelson had completed his report on the proceedings and findings, a final judgment would be entered and orders issued.

The NLRB would not issue its decision on the union's complaint for another two years, until September 15, 1939, but before the decision and its enforcement provisions could be carried out, the Ninth Circuit Court of Appeals would need to rule on the petition to enforce the NLRB's order. The final order was ultimately issued on July 21, 1941, four-and-a-half years after the strike ended.

The NLRB's conclusions and order were slightly modified in response to the NLRB's petition to enforce the order. The hearing to enforce the order was presided over by Judges Francis Arthur Garrecht, Bert E. Haney, and William Healy in the Ninth Circuit Court of Appeals.

The NLRB found and the appeals court concurred that the Grower-Shipper Vegetable Association and certain of its affiliated firms interfered with, restrained, and coerced the employees in the exercise of their rights guaranteed to them under the National Labor Relations Act, discriminated against some employees who were on strike by virtue of having been subjected to unfair labor practices by refusing to reinstate their employment once the strike was finished, and refused to bargain/bargain in good faith with the union as the representative of all employees in violation of the Act.

The NLRB also determined that the actions of law enforcement and its agents were "one of inexcusable police brutality, in many instances bordering upon sadism." Furthermore, the court decided that "the activities of the police in town…do not inspire one with a sense of respect. Innumerable false arrests were made, many without a shadow of evidence. Large numbers of persons were kept in jail for 4 or 5 days without having any charges brought against them." Nonetheless, the court could not assign responsibility for those actions to the GSVA or its member firms. The court noted that Colonel Sanborn appeared at the bidding of the attorney for the Citizens' Association, Edgar Thorne, and that Hoyt Sanders. However, he was an employee of the GSVA and was active in recruiting citizen deputies, and did not violate the Act in doing so. The NLRB found that Sanders' involvement in the violence on September 16 was due to his being ordered to the scene by Sheriff Abbott.

With respect to the suppliers' boycott of Tracy-Waldron Fruit Company when A. M. Tracy attempted to strike an agreement with the union, the NLRB found that the GSVA and its members interfered with, restrained, and coerced the employees, not only of the Tracy-Waldron Fruit Company, but also all of the members of the GSVA in the exercise of their rights guaranteed under the Act.

The NLRB also found that the GSVA and its members committed espionage against the union and its workers and, in doing so, interfered with, restrained, and coerced its employees in the exercise of their rights guaranteed under the Act.

Finally, the NLRB found that these "activities, having a close, intimate, and substantial relation to trade, traffic, and commerce among the several States," tended to lead and had led to labor disputes that burdened and obstructed commerce and the free flow of commerce.

The NLRB issued, and the Ninth Circuit Court sustained orders for the Grower-Shipper Vegetable Association and certain of its member firms to:

- Cease and desist from maintaining surveillance of or employing any manner of espionage to investigate the activities of the union, or the activities of their employees, or of any employees of members of the Association in connection with the union or any other labor organization.
- Cease and desist from interfering with, restraining, or coercing their employees and the employees of members of the Association in the exercise of the right to self-organization, to form labor organizations, to join or assist the union, or any other labor organization, to bargain collectively through representatives of their own choosing, and to engage in concerted activities for collective bargaining or other mutual aid or protection, as guaranteed in the National Labor Relations Act.
- Immediately offer full reinstatement or employment in their former or equivalent positions to employees identified by the Circuit Court as having been blacklisted.
- Reinstate employees and make whole for any loss of pay they have suffered because of the discrimination related to their hiring or tenure of employment by paying them a sum of money equal to that which each would normally have earned as wages during the period from the discrimination to the date of the offer of reinstatement or employment.
- Upon application, offer to the shed workers who were employed by it in the Salinas-Watsonville district on September 3, 1936, and who have not since been fully reinstated, full and immediate reinstatement, placing those employees for whom employment is not immediately available upon a preferential list and offering them employment as it becomes available.
- Make whole all the shed workers who were employed in the Salinas-Watsonville district on September 3, 1936, and who are ordered to be offered reinstatement for any loss of pay they will have suffered by reason of the respondent's refusal of reinstatement or placement on the preferential list.
- Post notices immediately in conspicuous places in its packing sheds in the Salinas-Watsonville district, stating that it will cease and desist as directed in the order and maintain those notices for sixty days from the date of posting.
- Publish in a daily newspaper of general circulation in Salinas and Watsonville, California, at least once every two weeks for a period of eight weeks, a notice stating that it will cease and desist as directed in the order.

The court also sustained the order instructing each of the pertinent respondents to notify the Regional Director for the Twentieth Region in writing within ten days from the date of the order what steps they had taken to comply with it.

Unfortunately, though, with the order not coming until nearly five years after the strike ended, the remedies were largely overcome by time.

The most substantive and lasting action regarding the 1936 Salinas Lettuce Strike came from the United States Senate and Wisconsin Senator Robert M. La Follette's Committee on Education and Labor, appointed under Senate Resolution 266 to investigate violations of civil liberties and the rights of labor. By the time the committee issued its April 15, 1938, interim report halfway through its five-year investigation, it had already conducted 74 days of hearings, heard from 343 witnesses, written 15 volumes of records and 3 reports, and had others in development. The records provided the basis for legislation passed in several states regarding civil liberties and labor rights.

The committee found that, with the adoption of the National Labor Relations Act of 1935, employer associations, as in Salinas, had begun leveraging third parties, such as citizens' committees, to perform anti-union functions they were not permitted to perform themselves under the Act. These third-party entities performed espionage, published propaganda in the form of notices and bulletins, employed detectives, special deputies, and strikebreakers, purchased weapons such as tear gas, machine guns, and clubs, and generally dedicated themselves to various specialized strikebreaking activities to discourage unionism, weaken unions, inflame workers and activists, all justified in the name of protecting against radicalism, deterring sabotage, and maintaining peace. The use of these third parties provided the employer associations with a degree of separation from the illicit activities, even as the rosters and meeting minutes of these third-party groups revealed that individual officers and members of the employer associations were on their rolls as well. In some cases, as in the 1936 Salinas lettuce strike, the employer associations themselves were members of the third-party groups, as if they were merely members rather than a driving force behind the third-party group's existence.

The delay in enforcing the National Labor Relations Board's ruling could be interpreted as a delay in justice. However, it helped produce the protections that the Fruit and Vegetable Workers Union No. 18211 sought all along. The campaign to win those protections began with the adoption of the Industrial Relations Board agreement in 1934, then the 1935 Imperial Valley Strike, during which two strikers were shot and killed, and which resulted in a persistent conflict in Salinas over the discrimination against workers subjected to unfair labor practices, and finally, the 1936 Salinas Lettuce Strike. Congress's determination to take note of developments on the California labor front, particularly in the tumultuous agricultural and agricultural-industrial arenas, as in the 1936 Salinas Lettuce Strike, helped establish a consciousness of the need for fair treatment of workers.
