= Designers Guild =

International home and lifestyle company

Designers Guild is an international luxury fabric and home furnishing brand, established by interior designer Tricia Guild in 1970, who opened a shop and showroom on Kings Road in London. Designers Guild designed, sold and wholesaled products including fabric furnishings, upholstery and wall coverings. The company expanded over a number of decades.

In 2025 Dunelm acquired the company's intellectual property and historic design collection, with Designers Guild then licensing those assets, before Designers Guild went into administration in 2026. Sanderson then agreed a licensing agreement with Dunelm, which allows them to design, manufacture and sell products, using the brand name.

== Company & history ==
Designer Tricia Guild founded the company Designers Guild in 1970, opening a shop on Kings Road in London. Her brother, Simon Jeffreys, joined the company in 1987, becoming Chief Executive.

Along with the company's main store in London, the British company sold goods including fabrics, upholstery and wall-coverings, via distributors internationally, and had showrooms in Paris, New York, Munich and Stockholm. By 2011, turnover had grown to over £50 million, and to £55 million by 2020.

Dunelm acquired the company's design collection and intellectual property, but agreed to license it back to the company, in a deal that did not include the Designers Guild shops or other assets, in 2025, after difficult trading conditions led to losses in 2022 and 2023, as the company had a large customer base in Europe and was impacted by Brexit.

The company went into administration in September 2026, with more than 90 employees made redundant. Sanderson agreed a 10 year licensing agreement with Dunelm, which allows Sanderson to create and sell luxury furnishings and interior design products such as fabrics, wallpapers and paint products, using the Designers Guild brand.

== Collections ==
Designers Guild collections included a range of luxury furnishing fabrics, wall coverings, bedroom and bathroom furnishings and plain fabrics. The company's products included rugs, cushions, throws and also fragrances, and Designers Guild was known for their use of bold colour, patterns and embroidery.

In September 2008, Designers Guild launched under license from the 'Royal Collection', a division of the Royal household, the Royal Collection Fabrics and Wallpapers. This collection was inspired by the interiors of Buckingham Palace and Windsor Castle, and by the official archive of art in the Royal Collection.

In addition to the Designers Guild and Royal collections the company designed and manufactured, under license, William Yeoward Fabrics and Wallpapers, and was the European and Middle East distributor for Ralph Lauren Fabrics and Wallpapers. In 2011, Designers Guild also had a license agreement with luxury brand Christian Lacroix.

== Awards ==
- 1996: Queen’s Award for Export Achievement.
- 2008: Microsoft award for Best Use of Technology.
- 2010: Best British Brand awarded by Elle Decoration UK.
