= Theodore Delevoryas =

American paleobotanist

- Born: July 22, 1929; Chicopee Falls, Massachusetts
- Died: June 29, 2017 (aged 87); Austin, Texas
- Education: University of Massachusetts; University of Illinois at Urbana-Champaign
- Scientific career
- Fields: Paleobotany
- Workplaces: Yale University; Yale Peabody Museum of Natural History; The University of Texas at Austin
- Author abbrev. (botany): Delev.

Theodore Delevoryas (July 22, 1929 – June 29, 2017) was an American paleobotanist who was an expert on Mesozoic fossil plants.

== Biography ==
Delevoryas received his undergraduate degree at the University of Massachusetts in 1950, and earned his master's degree from the University of Illinois at Urbana–Champaign in 1951. He pursued his Ph.D. from Illinois and graduated in 1954.

Delevoryas became an assistant professor at Michigan State University from 1955 to 1956, before being hired as an instructor at Yale University in New Haven, Connecticut. He left Yale for a professorship at the University of Illinois in 1960, but returned to Yale in 1962. He was appointed as a professor and as an associate curator of paleobotany at the Yale Peabody Museum of Natural History. In 1972, he left Yale for a position as professor of botany at The University of Texas at Austin.

Delevoryas served as president of the Botanical Society of America in 1974 and president of the International Organisation of Palaeobotany from 1978 to 1981. He retired from U.T. in 1995, but was brought back on as a professor emeritus in 1998.

Throughout his career, he published over 100 scholarly articles on fossil ferns, conifers, and cycads.

== Awards and fellowships ==
- Guggenheim Fellowship (1964)
- Fellow of the U.S. National Research Council (1954–1955)
- Fellow of the Linnean Society of London (1975)
- Distinguished Fellow of the Botanical Society of America (1978)
- Fellow of the American Association for the Advancement of Science (1990)
- Centennial Award of the Botanical Society of America (2006)
