= William Patrick Patterson =

American writer (1937–2023)

William Patrick Patterson (January 31, 1937 - July 7, 2023) was a spiritual teacher of the Fourth Way, an esoteric teaching of self-development brought to the West by G. I. Gurdjieff. Patterson was also an author, filmmaker and speaker on spiritual themes, including the Fourth Way, being and becoming, Advaita Vedanta, self-awakening, self-observation, esoteric Christianity, and conscious-body-breath-impressions. He was the editor-in-chief of The Gurdjieff Journal.

== Biography ==
Patterson was born in Pittsburgh, Pennsylvania. He was an exchange student at the University of Vienna and graduated from Bowling Green State University with a B.A. degree in English and minors in philosophy and psychology. He worked in New York for IBM, J. Walter Thompson, BBD&O and Harcourt Brace. He founded and edited In New York magazine and ran it for five years before selling it in 1969. Thereafter, he was the editor-in-chief of Food Management magazine and high-tech editor of Industry Week magazine. He resided in California and died in 2023.

Patterson was a longtime student of Lord John Pentland, who was appointed by Gurdjieff to be the leader of the Work in America and was the president of the New York and San Francisco Gurdjieff foundations. The Danish mystic Alfred Sorensen, who was given the name "Sunyata" in 1936 by Ramana Maharshi, lived with Patterson from 1982 and introduced him to Advaita Vedanta. Sunyata died in 1984 at the age of 94, but in the previous year he introduced Patterson to Jean Klein, a Western Advaita master with whom Patterson studied until Klein's death in 1998. Klein provided the foundation for a direct experiencing of the body, allowing Patterson to incorporate Work principles with Advaita Vedanta, which he has named "conscious-body-breath-impressions". Klein also provided the necessary catalysis and encouragement for the writing of Patterson's first book on The Gurdjieff Work, Eating The "I": A Direct Account of The Fourth Way.

== Teaching ==
Patterson was the founder/director of The Gurdjieff Legacy Foundation through which he teaches study groups, as well as organizes seminars, workshops, and talks on Fourth Way themes. He also founded and directs The Gurdjieff Studies Program, which allows students living out of the reach of ongoing Gurdjieff Legacy Foundation groups to participate in study through correspondence, seminars, and scheduled private meetings.

Sample group meetings are found in the "Fourth Way Meetings" section of Patterson's latest book, Spiritual Survival in a Radically Changing World-Time. The section consists of 324 questions and answers arranged in 36 subsections. Group study includes weekly meetings and "Days of Exploration" where practical work with Fourth Way ideas regarding attention and the triadic brain functioning of the body is explored, experienced, and refined.

== Published books ==
Partial list of published books:

- Eating The "I": A Direct Account of The Fourth Way (Arete Communications, Fairfax, CA, 1992)
- Struggle of the Magicians (Arete Communications, Fairfax, CA, 1998)
- Struggle of the Magicians (Greek Translation, Metaekdotiki, Thessalonika, Greece, 1999)
- Taking with the Left Hand (Arete Communications, Fairfax, CA, 1998)
- Taking with the Left Hand (Japanese Translation, The English Agency, Tokyo, Japan, 2004)
- Ladies of the Rope (Arete Communications, Fairfax, CA, 1998)
- Gurdjieff et Les Femmes de la Cordée (La Table Ronde, Paris, France, 2005)
- Voices in the Dark (Arete Communications, Fairfax, CA, 2000)
- The Life & Teachings of Carlos Castaneda (Arete Communications, Fairfax, CA, 2008)
- Spiritual Survival in a Radically Changing World-Time (Arete Communications, Fairfax, CA 2009)
- Adi Da Samraj Realized or/and Deluded? (Arete Communications, Fairfax, CA 2011)
- Georgi Ivanovitch Gurdjieff — The Man, The Teaching, His Mission (Arete Communications, Fairfax, CA 2014)
- Teachers of No-Thing & Nothing — Eating The "I" Parts II & III (Arete Communications, Fairfax, CA 2020)

== Filmography ==
- The Life & Teachings of Carlos Castaneda
- Introduction To Gurdjieff's Fourth Way: From Selves To Individual Self To The Self
- Introduction To Gurdjieff's Fourth Way: The Movement From Sex To Love
- Introduction To Gurdjieff's Fourth Way: What Is the Meaning of Human Life on the Planet Earth?
- Documentary Trilogy: The Life & Significance of George Ivanovitch Gurdjieff
