= Lillian Delevoryas =

American artist

- Born: 3 January 1932; Chicopee Falls, Massachusetts, US
- Died: 6 March 2018 (aged 86); Bristol, UK
- Education: Pratt Institute, Cooper Union, New York, US
- Occupations: Artist and designer
- Spouse: Robin Amis
- Children: Nicholas
- Writing career
- Years active: 1956-2017
- Website: lilliandelevoryas.com

Lillian Grace Delevoryas (January 3, 1932 - March 6, 2018) was an American artist whose career spanned six decades. Trained in Fine Art, Calligraphy and Woodblock printing she initially achieved recognition during the 1970s for her pioneering work in appliqué and tapestry for the fashion and interior design industries. In the 1980s this recognition led to commissions for commercial applications over a range of consumer products, most notably pottery, textile and paper. Since the 1990s, Delevoryas returned to painting and continued to exhibit and promote her work. She lived in the UK since the early 1970s and was married to the writer and poet Robin Amis.

== Early life, education and early career ==
Delevoryas was born in Chicopee Falls, Massachusetts on January 3, 1932 to Greek immigrant parents. She studied at the Pratt Institute and the Cooper Union in New York, where she gained her B.A. (Hons) in Fine Art. After graduation she spent some time in Japan, where she studied calligraphy and wood block printing with Toshi Yoshida and Tomi Tokuriki (Tomikichirō Tokuriki). She also studied in France before settling in New York. Here, she created her earliest major works – the New York Studio Series – an exploration of structure and of light, both real and reflected. These early works explored naturistic and intimist art combining various influences including Matisse and Picasso, revealing a love of colour and the strong graphic sense which informed her work ever since.

== Fabric applique and tapestry ==
In the late 1960s, she turned from painting to textile art, and, at the suggestion of Kaffe Fassett and Judy Brittain of Vogue, she came to London, where she was commissioned to design tapestries for private homes and costumes for celebrities and pop stars. Her work in fabric appliqué was featured widely, including in Vogue.

In 1972, she married writer Robin Amis. The wedding dress she created was featured in Vogue magazine and latterly exhibited in the 2014 "Here Comes the Brides" Exhibition at the Victoria and Albert Museum. It is now in the Museum's permanent collection as an example of the spirit of the times.

She and her husband moved to the Forest of Dean in Gloucestershire, where they founded the Weatherall Workshops, creating tapestry and needlepoint pieces. The work produced from their designs and stitched into tapestries won many awards and were exhibited widely, including the V & A Queens Jubilee exhibition, the Royal College of Art and ‘Threads of History’ at The Courtauld Institute of Art.

== Watercolour and design ==
Her time at Weatherall marked the beginning of her love affair with the English garden, whose profusion of colour reinforced her already strong love of pattern. The floral watercolours produced during this period quickly translated into designs. This design work which covered a variety of applications were featured by Divertimenti, Burleigh Pottery and Habitat; she also created fabric designs for Designers Guild and stationery products for Elgin Court.

== Later years ==
In the 90s, she returned to her native Massachusetts, and during that period produced a series of landscapes inspired by the marshlands and tidal estuaries of the coastline.

From the mid-90s onwards she was increasingly influenced by the landscape and religious art of Greece as a result of her husband's frequent visits to Mount Athos. She was particularly interested in icons of the Eastern Church and subsequently devoted herself to learning the techniques of iconography. This work eventually led to many paintings inspired by iconography and eventually the publication of her first book, Visual Contemplations, the artist's visual meditation on the text The Life Of Moses by St Gregory of Nyssa.

Delevoryas continued working into her eighties, and received attention in 2011 for her iPad paintings. Her exhibition, ‘Three Decades of Art’, was held at the Walton & Bovill Gallery, Suffolk, England, in the summer of 2016.

== Death ==
Delevoryas died at her home in Bristol, U.K. on March 6, 2018.

== Solo exhibitions ==
=== United States ===
- New York SIX Gallery, 1964-1966
- Robert Schoelkopf Gallery, New York, 1965-1968
- Royal Athena Gallery, New York, 1967
- Churchill Gallery, Newburyport, Massachusetts, 1990
- Maliotis Cultural Center, Hellenic College, Brookline, Massachusetts, 1991

=== United Kingdom ===
- Liberty's of London, 1975
- Gloucester Museum and Art Gallery 1976
- Copernican Connection, E. Yorkshire, 1982
- Gallery 10, London, 1985
- Hellenic Centre, London, 2000
- College of St. Mark and St. John, Plymouth, 2000
- University of Exeter, 2001
- Art Spaces, Totnes, 2009
- Rostra & Rooksmore Gallery, Bath, 2011
- Walton & Bovill Fine Art, 2016

=== Europe ===
- Designers Guild, Paris, France, 1982
- Amerika-Haus, Munich, Germany, 1985
- Kinsthandlung, Hanfstaengl, Munich, Germany, 1985

== Group exhibitions ==
=== United States ===
- San Francisco Museum of Art, 1957
- deYoung Museum, San Francisco, 1958
- Massachusetts College of Art, Boston, MA, 2000

=== United Kingdom ===
- Revival of Art in Needlework, London, 1975
- V & A Museum, Queen's Jubilee Exhibition, 1977
- Royal College of Art, London, 1977
- British Genius, London, 1977
- Royal Academy Summer Show, 1978
- Royal West of England Academy, Bristol, 2000
- Print 86, The Barbican, London, 1986
- Delamore Gallery, Cornwood, Devon, 2007-2008
- V & A Museum ‘Here Come the Brides’ exhibition, 2014

== Awards ==
- Louis Comfort Tiffany Award in painting, New York, 1965
- New York Art Directors Association Gold Award, 1977
- Copley Society of Art – awarded Artist Member 1990
