= Robin Amis =

British author, poet, publisher, editor and translator

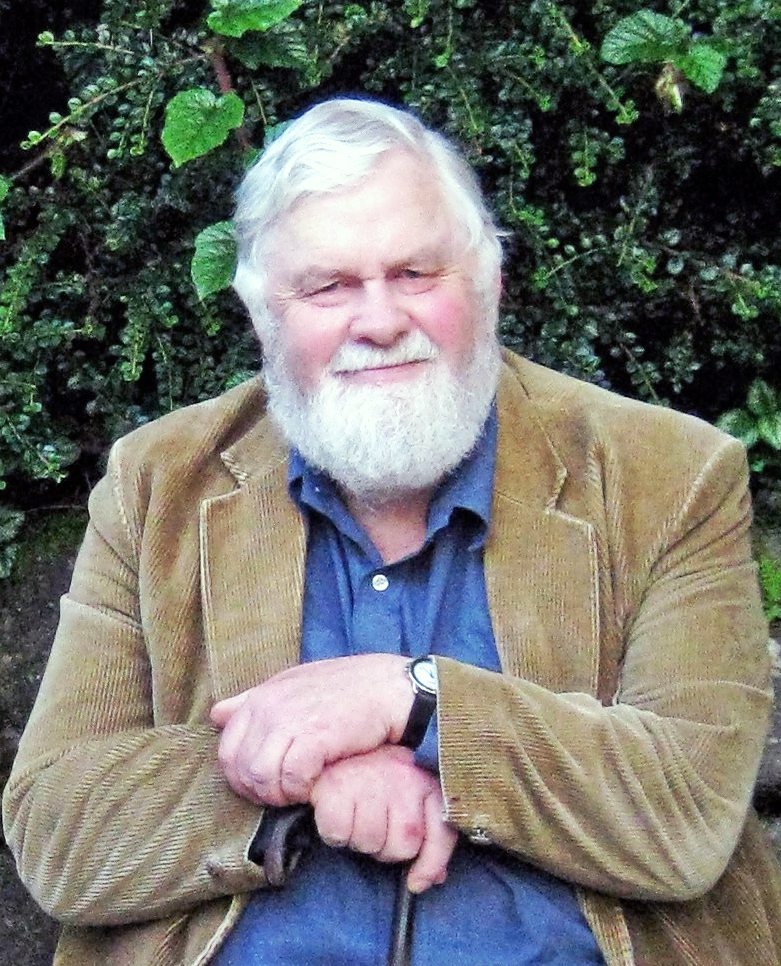
- Photograph by Lillian Delevoryas
- Born: Robin Henry Amis; 10 June 1932; Finchley, London, England
- Died: 13 June 2014 (aged 82); Bristol, England
- Resting place: Church of St. Edward the Martyr, Brookwood, Surrey, England
- Education: St Bees School
- Occupations: Author, editor, translator
- Spouse: Lillian Delevoryas
- Children: 4
- Writing career
- Notable work: A Different Christianity

Robin Amis (1932–2014) was a British author, poet, publisher, editor and translator. Although he had studied a wide range of spiritual traditions, including Kabbalah, the Fourth Way and Hindu teachings, it was his conversion to the Eastern Orthodox Church and his relationship with Mount Athos, the ancient monastic republic in Greece, that ultimately defined his life and work. Over a thirty-year period, between 1982 and 2013, he made more than 60 visits to Mount Athos, where he was recognised as a "synergatis", a fellow worker and equal of the monks. Amis documented the results of his research in A Different Christianity: Early Christian Esotericism and Modern Thought (SUNY, 1995), and recounted his experience on the Holy Mountain in Views from Mount Athos (Praxis 2014). As founder of Praxis Institute Press, he translated, edited and published the three-volume English language edition of Gnosis by Boris Mouravieff as well as books on Hesychasm and the spiritual tradition of Eastern Orthodoxy. He was married to the American artist Lillian Delevoryas and in the last years of his life lived in Bristol, England.

== Early life ==
Robin Amis was born on 10 June 1932 in Finchley, London, to Henry "Glennie" Amis and Dorothy Amis (Beckton). His early schooling was at Frinton-on-Sea, but because of the outbreak of the Second World War he was evacuated at the age of 7 to Portmerion in North Wales. He remained there until the age of 12 and continued his education at St Bees School on the edge of the Lake District National Park. After school Amis found work in the electronics industry. His skill in writing and designing electronic manuals led him to becoming an advertising copywriter. He worked for various agencies including Arthur Wasey, J. Walter Thompson, and Riley Advertising where he became creative director.

In the early 1960s, Amis expanded his writing skills and turned to poetry as a medium. In 1989, some of his early poetry was published in Who Writes the Waves (Agora Books and Two Rivers Farm Press).

== The Study Society and Weatherall ==
In the early 1960s Amis joined the Study Society in London, which was led by one of P. D. Ouspensky's former students, Francis Roles. By the late 1960s, Amis was leading study groups in various parts of England, including Bristol, Birmingham, Sussex and Gloucestershire.

Amis met and married American artist Lillian Delevoryas in 1972. Together they opened Weatherall Workshops in the Forest of Dean, Gloucestershire. The Weatherall Design Studio specialised in tapestry and applique wall hangings and the work was supervised by Delevoryas and fellow American designer Kaffe Fassett. The Workshops won a number of national awards at Courtauld House, as well as exhibiting at the Victoria and Albert Museum and The Royal College of Art for the Silver Jubilee of Queen Elizabeth II in 1977. Weatherall gained its reputation as an example of using varied artistic skills to create large original works of an exceptional standard, often employing a large number of people in a non-competitive environment for periods of time as short as one weekend to residential courses lasting for a fortnight. This artistic endeavour was also a way of applying Fourth Way principles and practices of self-remembering and working with attention, as defined by P. D. Ouspensky and George Gurdjieff. The project closed in 1979.

== Mount Athos ==
In 1979, Amis took a group of his students to meet with Metropolitan Anthony of Sourozh, Bishop of the Russian Orthodox Church. This meeting, in turn, led to Amis' interest in Orthodoxy and the ancient monastic tradition that had been preserved on Mount Athos. Amis first visited Athos in 1982 and by chance met with Gerald Palmer, a former student of Ouspensky who had converted to Orthodoxy in 1950. Palmer's spiritual teacher on Athos was Father Nikon who encouraged Palmer to acquire, translate and publish the Philokalia, the compendium of teachings of the Church Fathers of the Eastern Orthodox Church. This translation was started by Gerald Palmer and E. Kadloubovsky, and continued by Palmer, Kallistos Ware and Philip Sherrard. It was begun at a time when very few Orthodox books were available in the English language.

As a result of his meeting with Gerald Palmer as well as Ware and Sherrard, Amis set up Praxis Institute Press in 1985. The press published a number of works on the Orthodox tradition, including The Eros of Repentance, The Path of Prayer, The Heart of Salvation: The Life and Teachings of Theophan the Recluse, and A Method of Prayer for Modern Times. Praxis also published an audiotape of sayings from the Philokalia on Prayer of the Heart, compiled by Palmer and read by Sergei (Kadloubovsky) Kadleigh. Amis’ initial visits to Mount Athos in turn led to his own conversion to Eastern Orthodoxy in 1983.

== Gnosis trilogy ==
Between 1987 and 1993, Amis and a small team that included Lillian Amis, Sergei Kadleigh and his wife Leslie, translated, edited and published the three-volume work, Gnosis, A Study and Commentary on the Esoteric Tradition of Eastern Orthodoxy by Mouravieff. Originally published in France between 1960 and 1963, Gnosis was based on the course entitled "An Introduction to esoteric philosophy according to the esoteric tradition of Eastern Orthodoxy" that Mouravieff had taught at the University of Geneva. The work delineated a teaching that, unlike those of P.D. Ouspensky and G. I. Gurdjieff, was openly grounded in Eastern Orthodox Christianity. The translation received funding and support by a number of former pupils of Ouspensky and Gurdjieff that included: Aubrey Wolton, and Ailsa Lenney, the secretary of Kenneth Walker. The publication of Gnosis into English aroused controversy in some Gurdjieff circles who disputed the claim made by Mouravieff and Amis that there was a link between Gurdjieff's teaching and the monastic tradition of Eastern Orthodoxy. Amis outlined his position and the results of his research in an article published in Gnosis magazine, entitled, 'Mouravieff and the Secret of the Source' and at the first All and Everything Conference in England 1996.

== Later years and Praxis Research Institute ==
In his later years, Amis concentrated on writing, lecturing and teaching. He continued to make regular bi-annual visits to Mount Athos, establishing a close relationship with Osiou Gregoriou monastery, its abbot, Archimandrite George Kapsanis, and the brotherhood of monks there. The importance of this relationship is highlighted in A Study of English Orthodox Theological Terms published by Gregoriou Monastery in which Amis is credited with pointing out "the confusion present in English terms" in a number of important English language translations of key Orthodox texts as well as important observations on the condition of the Western psyche.

During those visits, Amis placed himself under obedience with an elder, Saint Paisios of Mount Athos. At one of these meetings St. Paisios told him:

"You English have served man very well with your intellect, giving him many things he needs, the solutions to many problems that have made life easier for everyone. Now you should do another work – to understand and tell the world of the inner truth, the truth of the heart as well".

In many ways, this instruction defined the latter part of Amis's life, which he devoted to this task. He formed Praxis Research Institute and working with a small number of associates and students around the world through video conferencing he developed his ideas for bringing Hesychasm to spiritual seekers who have to live and work in the world.

Amis documented the results of his research in his book A Different Christianity, which was published by the State University of New York Press in 1995. The book, which has remained in print, has been influential in making available to a wider non-Orthodox audience in the West the experiential knowledge and inner practices contained within Eastern Orthodoxy and in particular the Athonite spiritual tradition.

In 2005 he published a translation of Book One of Triads in Defence of the Holy Hesychasts by Gregory Palamas under the title of The Triads: Book One. Amis continued work on this text until his death, revising the translation and preparing a commentary. This work was published in 2016 under the title Holy Hesychia: The Stillness That Knows God.

In addition, he was also working on another book, Kardia, a follow-up to A Different Christianity, which detailed and made accessible many aspects of monastic tradition for practical application in ordinary life, which is yet to be published.

Amis died in Bristol, England, aged 82 on 13 June 2014.

== Bibliography ==
As author

- Amis, Robin Who Writes the Waves ISBN 978-1872292038 Agora Books/Two Rivers Press 1 May 1988
- Amis, Robin A Different Christianity ISBN 978-1872292397 State University of New York Press, Second edition Praxis 13 June 2003
- Amis, Robin Views from Mount Athos ISBN 978-1872292328, Praxis 19 April 2014

As translator/publisher/editor

- Ouspensky, P. D. The Psychology and Cosmology of Man’s Possible Evolution ISBN 1872292003 Agora 31 December 1988
- Ouspensky, P.D. The Cosmology of Man's Possible Evolution Agora Books ISBN 978-1872292014 Praxis 1 April 1989
- Amis, Robin (editor) The Heart of Salvation: The Life and Teachings of Russia's Saint Theophian the Recluse ISBN 978-1872292021 Praxis 1 June 1992
- St. Theophan the Recluse, editor Amis, Robin The Path of Prayer: Four Sermons on Prayer ISBN 978-1872292144 Praxis 1 June 1992
- G.E.H. Palmer (selected by) and S. Kadloubovsky (reader) Readings from the Philokalia ISBN 9789993939948 Praxis 1 May 1994
- Kovalesvsky, Eugraph A Method of Prayer for Modern Times ISBN 1872292186 Praxis 1 May 1993
- Mouravieff, Boris Gnosis, Book One, Exoteric Cycle: Study and Commentaries on the Esoteric Tradition of Eastern Orthodoxy ISBN 978-1872292106 Praxis 1 June 1990
- Mouravieff, Boris Gnosis, Book Two, Mesoteric Cycle: Study and Commentaries on the Esoteric Tradition of Eastern Orthodoxy ISBN 978-1872292113 Praxis 1 June 1992
- Mouravieff, Boris Gnosis, Book Three, Esoteric Cycle: Study and Commentaries on the Esoteric Tradition of Eastern Orthodoxy ISBN 978-1872292120 Praxis 1 May 1993
- St. Gregory Palamas, Translator and Editor Amis, Robin The Triads, Book One ISBN 1872292151 Praxis 1 May 2002
- Kapsanis, George The Eros of Repentance ISBN 978-0-9955103-2-6 Praxis EXP PUB DATE Autumn 2016
