= Nicholas Guild =

American novelist

Nicholas Guild is an American novelist. He was born in Belmont, California in 1944 and educated at Occidental College in Los Angeles and the University of California at Berkeley, where he earned an M.A. in Comparative Literature and a Ph.D. in English. He currently lives in Frederick, Maryland.

He is the author of the 1987 novel The Assyrian and its sequel, The Blood Star, following the fictionalised history of Tiglath Ashur, a fictional half-brother of the historical Esarhaddon, a real-life king of Assyria. The Orange Coast magazine states that the book recreated the period so effectively that "you'd swear the author, Nicholas Guild, researched the book in a previous life."

== Novels ==
- The Macedonian (2017)
- The Spartan Dagger (2016)
- The Ironsmith (2016)
- Blood Ties (2015)
- Angel (1995)
- The Blood Star (1989)
- The Assyrian (1987)
- The Berlin Warning (1984)
- The Linz Tattoo (1985)
- Chain Reaction (1983)
- The President's Man (1982)
- The Favor (1981)
- The Summer Soldier (1978)
- Old Acquaintance (1978)
- The Lost and Found Man (1975)
