= Mondays: See You 'This' Week! =

2022 Japanese film directed by Ryo Takebayashi

Mondays: See You 'This' Week! (Japanese: MONDAYS／このタイムループ、上司に気づかせないと終わらない, Hepburn: Mondays: Kono taimurūpu, jōshi ni kidzuka senai to owaranai, lit. 'Mondays: This time loop will not end until the boss is made aware of it') is a 2022 Japanese comedy/science fiction movie directed by Ryō Takebayashi and written by Saeri Natsuo and Ryō Takebayashi.

== Plot ==
A Japanese office lady, Akemi Yoshikawa, has a pressing deadline at her advertising job. Her coworkers Takuto Endо̄ and Ken Murata are convinced they are in a time loop, reliving the same week repeatedly. After they successfully point out the future numerous times, and a few rounds of reliving the same events, Yoshikawa realises they're telling the truth. They then must first convince the rest of the staff, and then find the solution to stopping the time loop.

Eventually focusing on the bosses jade bracelet, which they believe to be cursed, they destroy it... only to find it is in fact plastic not jade and has no effect.

They then find one of the staff is aware of the time loop that hasn't come forward. She tells that she was aware before anyone else, and she thinks the problem is to do with an unfinished manga which is holding back her life from being fulfilled while she does her mundane job.

The staff all work on the unfinished manga as a team. They have problems convincing the boss, who apparently can't take in information unless it is presented to him in a business presentation. The staff put the information into a PowerPoint presentation, which convinces him.

They finally complete it when they find out the boss, who was previously a manga artist also is frustrated and was never able to be a mangaka. He gets involved and finishes it off properly.

Finally, the manga is submitted to the editor, who approves it, and the time loop is broken.

== Cast ==
- Wan Marui as Akemi Yoshikawa
- Koki Osamura as Takuto Endо̄
- Yûgo Mikawa as Ken Murata
- Makita Sports as Shigeru Nagahisa
- Ryô Ikeda as Yudai Sakino
- Shimada Momoi as Kandagawa Seiko
- Haruki Takano as Ichiro Taira
- Kotaro Yagi as Sotaro Moriyama

== See also ==
- List of films featuring time loops
