= Fourth Way (disambiguation) =

The Fourth Way is an esoteric school of thought.

Fourth Way may also refer to:

- The Fourth Way (book), a book by P. D. Ouspensky
- The Fourth Way (band), an American jazz quartet
