= Time loop =

Plot device in fiction

The time loop or temporal loop is a plot device in fiction whereby characters re-experience a span of time which is repeated, sometimes more than once, with some hope of breaking out of the cycle of repetition. Time loops are constantly resetting; when a certain condition is met, such as a death of a character or a certain point in time, the loop starts again, possibly with one or more characters retaining the memories from the previous loop.

A time loop is also sometimes used to describe a scenario involving time travel where events form a circular chain of causality. In this context, actions in the past lead to future events, which then trigger the original journey back in time, creating a self-contained loop without a clear starting point. This concept challenges the conventional linear view of time and is often explored in science fiction and theories of temporal physics, such as those involving closed timelike curves.

== History ==
An early example of a time loop is the 1915 Russian novel Strange Life of Ivan Osokin, where the main character gets to live his life over again but struggles to change it the second time around. The episode "The Man Who Murdered Time" in the radio drama The Shadow was broadcast on 1 January 1939, about a dying scientist who invents a time machine stuck on 31 December. The short story "Doubled and Redoubled" by Malcolm Jameson that appeared in the February 1941 Unknown tells of a person accidentally cursed to repeat a "perfect" day, including a lucky bet, a promotion, a heroically foiled bank robbery, and a successful wedding proposal.

More recent examples include the 1973 short story "12:01 PM" and its 1990 and 1993 film adaptations, the Soviet film Mirror for a Hero (1988), the Star Trek: The Next Generation episode "Cause And Effect" (1992), the American films Groundhog Day (1993), Naked (2017), Happy Death Day (2017), Happy Death Day 2U (2019), and Palm Springs (2020), the British, found footage, psychological, analog horror web series No Through Road (2009–2012), the Danish series of novels Om udregning af rumfang (On The Calculation of Volume) (2020- ), and the Indian, Tamil-language, science fiction, political action thriller film Maanaadu. Time loops have been used as a recurring theme in Doctor Who, with the episode "Heaven Sent" being described as "Doctor Who's definitive loop-based story".

=== Japanese popular culture ===
The time loop is a popular trope in Japanese pop culture media, especially anime. Its use in Japanese fiction dates back to Yasutaka Tsutsui's science fiction novel The Girl Who Leapt Through Time (1965), one of the earliest works to feature a time loop, about a high school girl who repeatedly relives the same day. It was later adapted into a 1972 live-action Japanese television series, a hit 1983 live-action film, a 2006 anime film, and a 2010 live-action film. The 1983 live-action film adaptation of The Girl Who Leapt Through Time was a major box office success in Japan, where it was the second highest-grossing Japanese film of 1983. Its success was soon followed by numerous anime and manga using the time loop concept, starting with Mamoru Oshii's anime film Urusei Yatsura 2: Beautiful Dreamer (1984), and then the manga and anime series Kimagure Orange Road (1984–1988).

The time loop has since become a familiar anime trope. Other popular Japanese works that use the time loop concept include Hiroyuki Kanno's science fiction visual novel YU-NO: A Girl Who Chants Love at the Bound of this World (1996), the visual novel and anime franchise Higurashi When They Cry (2002), the light novel and anime franchise Haruhi Suzumiya (2003), Mamoru Oshii's Japanese cyberpunk anime film Ghost in the Shell 2: Innocence (2004), Hiroshi Sakurazaka's sci-fi light novel All You Need is Kill (2004) which was adapted into the Hollywood film Edge of Tomorrow (2014) starring Tom Cruise, and the sci-fi visual novel and anime franchise Steins;Gate (2009).

== As a puzzle ==
Stories with time loops commonly center on the character learning from each successive loop through time. Jeremy Douglass, Janet Murray, Noah Falstein and others compare time loops with video games and other interactive media, where a character in a loop learns about their environment more and more with each passing loop, and the loop ends with complete mastery of the character's environment. Shaila Garcia-Catalán et al. provide a similar analysis, saying that the usual way for the protagonist out of a time loop is acquiring knowledge, using retained memories to progress and eventually exit the loop. The time loop is then a problem-solving process, and the narrative becomes akin to an interactive puzzle.

The presentation of a time loop as a puzzle has subsequently led to video games that are centered on the time loop mechanic, giving the player the ability to learn and figure out the rules themselves. Games like The Legend of Zelda: Majora's Mask, Minit, The Sexy Brutale, Outer Wilds, 12 Minutes, Returnal and Deathloop were all designed to allow the player to figure out the loop's sequences of events and then navigate their character through a loop a final time to successfully complete the game. According to Raul Rubio, the CEO of Tequila Works that created The Sexy Brutale, "Time loops allow players to train to get better at the game, faster, smarter, by experimenting from a fixed starting situation, and seeing what it works to move 'forward' within the loop and adding something else to that structure to build a solid process."

== See also ==
- Butterfly effect
- Eternal return
- Grandfather paradox
- List of time travel works of fiction
- List of films featuring time loops
- Strange loop
- Time loop logic
- Time slip
- Time travel
- Time travel in fiction
- Category:Video games about time loops
