= Meaning and Purpose =

Book by Kenneth Walker

- Author: Kenneth Walker
- Language: English
- Publisher: Jonathan Cape
- Publication date: September 1944
- Publication place: United Kingdom

Meaning and Purpose, written by Kenneth Walker, was first published in September 1944 by Jonathan Cape, London, and republished by Pelican Books in 1950.

The purpose of the book, as stated in the preface, was "... to examine critically those scientific theories of the last hundred years which have exerted a strong influence on our thinking, not so much for the purpose of assessing their worth as for that of discovering the effect which they have had on our philosophy of life."

The book detailed an alternative perception of life and reality. It offered arguments proposing that neither Charles Darwin nor religious creationism adequately described the event of life, intellect, consciousness and various other concepts.

The first chapter opened with a discussion of a passage quoted from Goethe, there described as a poet, philosopher and scientist. Others whose writings as prominent scientists were listed in the book's bibliography were Sir Arthur Eddington, Ernst Haeckel, Sir Julian Huxley, Sir James Jeans and A. N. Whitehead.

A hostile review in 1949, mentioned that the book referred unfavourably to Karl Marx as never to be regarded as having been a profound thinker and concluded that it was "by a superficial man serving reactionary purposes".
