= Last man =

Antithesis to the Übermensch in Nietzschean philosophy

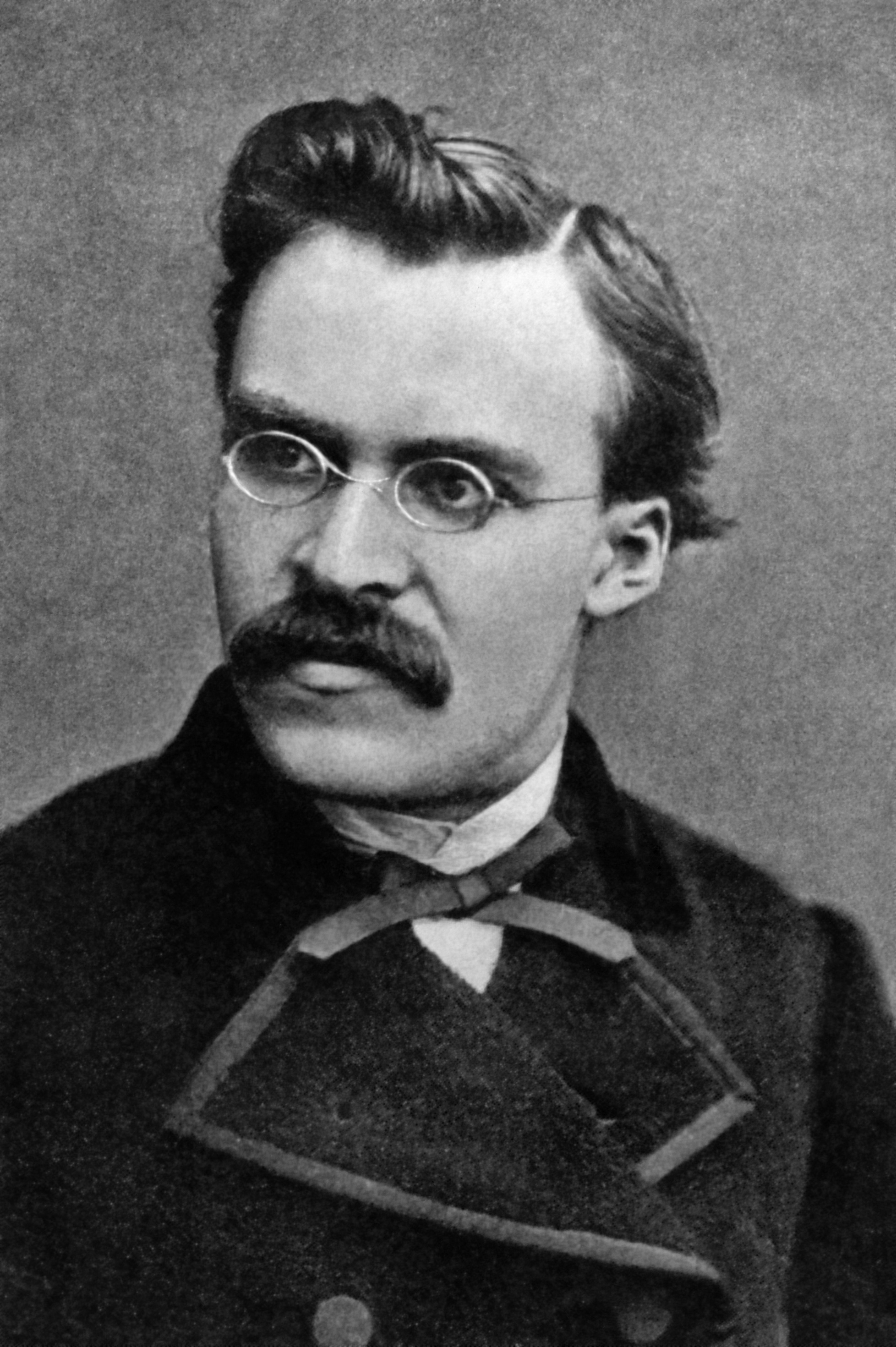
Friedrich Nietzsche around 1869

The last man (German: Letzter Mensch) is a term used by the philosopher Friedrich Nietzsche in Thus Spoke Zarathustra to describe the antithesis of his theorized superior being, the Übermensch, whose imminent appearance is heralded by Zarathustra. The last man is the archetypal passive nihilist. He is tired of life, takes no risks, and seeks only comfort and security. Therefore, the last man is unable to build and act upon a self-actualized ethos.

== Appearance in Thus Spoke Zarathustra ==
The last man's first appearance is in "Zarathustra's Prologue". According to Nietzsche, the last man is the goal that modern society and Western civilization have apparently set for themselves. After having unsuccessfully attempted to get the populace to accept the Übermensch as the goal of society, Zarathustra confronts them with a goal so disgusting that he assumes that it will revolt them – a culture which seeks only passive comfort and routine, avoiding everything that could potentially bring risk, pain, or disappointment. Zarathustra fails in this attempt, and instead of repelling and manipulating the populace into pursuing the goal of the Übermensch, the populace take Zarathustra literally and choose the "disgusting" goal of becoming the last men. This decision leaves Zarathustra disheartened and disappointed.

== Nietzsche's predictions ==
Nietzsche warned that the society of the last man could be too barren and decadent to support the growth of healthy human life or great individuals. The last man is only possible by mankind having bred an apathetic person or society who loses the ability to dream, to strive, and who become unwilling to take risks, instead simply earning their living and keeping warm. The society of the last man is antithetical to Nietzsche's theoretical will to power, the main driving force and ambition behind human nature, according to Nietzsche, as well as all other life in the universe.

The last man, Nietzsche predicted, would be one response to the problem of nihilism. But the full implications of the death of God had yet to unfold: "The event itself is far too great, too distant, too remote from the multitude's capacity for comprehension even for the tidings of it to be thought of as having arrived as yet."

== Quotations ==
Quotations on the concept of the "last man" by Nietzsche:

The opposite of the overman [Übermensch] is the last man: I created him at the same time with that. Everything superhuman appears to man as illness and madness. You have to be a sea to absorb a dirty stream without getting dirty.

— eKGWB/NF-1882,4[171] – Fragments November 1882 – February 1883

For this is how things are: the diminution and leveling of European man constitutes our greatest danger, for the sight of him makes us weary.—We can see nothing today that wants to grow greater, we suspect that things will continue to go down, down, to become thinner, more good-natured, more prudent, more comfortable, more mediocre, more indifferent, more Chinese, more Christian—there is no doubt that man is getting 'better' all the time.

— eKGWB/GM-I-12 – On the Genealogy of Morals (1887)

They discover, these sharp onlookers and loafers, that the end is quickly approaching, that everything around them decays and produces decay, that nothing will endure until the day after tomorrow, except one species of man, the incurably MEDIOCRE. The mediocre alone have a prospect of continuing and propagating themselves–they will be the men of the future, the sole survivors

— eKGWB/JGB-262 – Beyond Good and Evil (1886) : 262

== See also ==
- Endling
- Superfluous man
- The End of History and the Last Man
