= 12:01 PM (1990 film) =

1990 short film

- Directed by: Jonathan Heap
- Written by: Stephen Tolkin; Jonathan Heap
- Based on: "12:01 P.M." by Richard A. Lupoff
- Produced by: Teresa E. Kounin
- Starring: Kurtwood Smith; Laura Harrington; Don Amendolia; Jane Alden
- Cinematography: Charlie Lieberman
- Edited by: Hubert de la Bouillerie
- Music by: Stephen Melillo
- Production company: Chanticleer Films
- Release date: 1990
- Running time: 25 minutes
- Country: United States
- Language: English

12:01 PM is a 1990 short film directed by Jonathan Heap and starring Kurtwood Smith. It aired on cable television in 1990 as part of the Showtime 30-Minute Movie anthology series. The film was nominated for an Academy Award for Live Action Short Film.

It is the first film adaptation of the short story "12:01 P.M." by Richard A. Lupoff, which was published in the December 1973 edition of The Magazine of Fantasy and Science Fiction. The major plot device is a time loop or time bounce.

== Plot ==
Myron Castleman is an everyman stuck in a loop that forces him to constantly relive the same hour of his life over and over. He is the only person aware of this. During one loop, he discovers that a scientist named Nathan Rosenbluth has predicted an event that matches his experience. Castleman calls him and explains what is going on; however, Rosenbluth is highly skeptical of his claims. Over the next loops, Myron struggles to get into contact with Rosenbluth again, and in the process becomes frustrated to the point of screaming at his secretary and throwing his suitcase into traffic. Eventually, he does manage to talk to Rosenbluth, who initially dismisses Myron as crazy until Myron describes the transition as the scientist had predicted (including the phrase "Consciousness is an independent variable," which is central to Rosenbluth's theories). The professor sadly informs Castleman that there is nothing that can be done, causing Myron to become hysterical and shoot himself. There is a brief pause until Myron finds himself back at the beginning of the loop, realizing that he is trapped for eternity.

== Home media ==
12:01 PM was released on DVD in the United States late in 2006, and is also available on DVD in the UK, collected on a DVD with other short films.

== See also ==
- List of films featuring time loops
- 12:01 - The 1993 full length TV version of the story.
