= The Log of the Ark =

The Log of the Ark is a children's book written by Kenneth Walker and illustrated by Geoffrey Boumphrey. It was first published by Constable & Co., London, 1923. It was first published in the US by E.P. Dutton & Co., New York, 1926 under the title What Happened in the Ark. One of the many editions was by Puffin Books in 1963.

== Plot summary ==
The book's plot describes the way in which an outcast animal, the scub, infiltrates the ark and introduces certain of the other species to the idea of eating meat. (Until this point, all the animals eat porridge with a dollop of treacle.) This sinister development is described alongside a good deal of slapstick humour. For example, the nautically naive Noah initially constructs the ark with all the large animals quartered together for social reasons, only discovering the consequences for its stability when the flood waters surround it.

Like many later fictionalisations of the Noah story, from Gary Larson to Julian Barnes, it introduces mythical beasts such as the unicorn into the Ark's passenger list, a device with obvious dramatic potential: we assume that such creatures are unlikely to survive the voyage. Here, as elsewhere, the comic elements mask tragic ones to good effect. Especially memorable is the plight of the 'Seventy-sevenses', a pair of nondescript and painfully shy mammals who name themselves after the number of their cabin, and who eventually abandon the Ark on a small raft because the atmosphere on board has become too oppressive. There was also an even sadder pair of animals "The Clidders" who melted when it began to rain!

Outwardly this is a de-theologised version of the story: God does not appear, and the purpose of the Flood is not mass drowning. Yet the way the scub creeps into the childish innocence of the Ark and subverts it still points to a narrative patterned by Christian concepts of the Fall. In the final scene, a horrified Noah – who has not yet realised quite what has happened on his ship – watches as the newly released animals chase and fly from one another, awakened to their new identities as hunters and hunted.
