= 12:01 (1993 film) =

- DVD cover
- Genre: Science fiction
- Based on: "12:01 P.M." by Richard Lupoff
- Teleplay by: Philip Morton
- Story by: Jonathan Heap
- Directed by: Jack Sholder
- Starring: Jonathan Silverman; Helen Slater; Nicolas Surovy; Robin Bartlett; Jeremy Piven; Constance Marie; Glenn Morshower; Martin Landau
- Music by: Peter Rodgers Melnick
- Country of origin: United States
- Original language: English

Production
- Executive producers: Jana Sue Memel; Sasha Emerson
- Producers: Jonathan Heap; Robert J. Degus; Cindy Hornickel
- Cinematography: Anghel Decca
- Editor: Michael N. Knue
- Running time: 92 minutes
- Production companies: New Line Cinema; Chanticleer Films; Fox West Pictures

Original release
- Network: Fox
- Release: July 5, 1993

12:01 is a 1993 American science fiction television film directed by Jack Sholder and starring Jonathan Silverman, Helen Slater, Jeremy Piven, and Martin Landau. It originally aired on the Fox Network in the United States on July 5, 1993.

It is an adaptation of Richard Lupoff's short story "12:01 P.M.," published in the December 1973 issue of The Magazine of Fantasy & Science Fiction. The story had previously been adapted into the 1990 short film 12:01 PM starring Kurtwood Smith.

== Plot ==
Barry Thomas is bored with his job and moons over high-profile scientist Lisa Fredericks, who is working on a particle accelerator that accelerates faster than the speed of light, but is about to be shut down because of potential risks.

On the way home, Barry sees Lisa fatally shot and takes it very hard. While at home at midnight, he receives a strong electrical shock. The next morning the events of the previous day are repeating themselves and Barry is the only one who realizes that the world is stuck in a time loop. During several repetitions, Barry figures out how to save Lisa and get closer to her. His actions also get him fired and arrested for knowing too much about events. Barry and Lisa eventually learn that her boss, Dr. Thadius Moxley, caused the time loop by conducting illegal and unethical experiments with the particle accelerator in the hopes of profiting from its extreme cheap energy. Moxley sent his henchmen to murder Lisa because she already knew too much about his activities. After getting involved with an undercover government agent, they must stop Moxley from starting his experiment at the end of a loop or the world will be trapped forever repeating the same day.

Expanding on the original's premise of a one-hour time loop, this version saw the main character reliving the same 24-hour period, which would restart at one minute past midnight (rather than midday as in the other versions). It also contains a happy ending, as the protagonist ultimately finds a way to correct the time loop, and find love, over the course of the film’s 92-minute running time.

== Cast ==
- Jonathan Silverman as Barry Thomas
- Helen Slater as Lisa Fredericks
- Jeremy Piven as Howard Richter
- Nicolas Surovy as Dr. Robert Denk
- Martin Landau as Dr. Thadius Moxley
- Robin Bartlett as Anne Jackson
- Danny Trejo as Prisoner
- Constance Marie as Joan Zevo
- Glenn Morshower as Detective Cryers
- Paxton Whitehead as Dr. Tiberius Scott
- Giuseppe Andrews as Kyle (as Joey Andrews)
- Frank Collison as Assassin
- Cheryl Anderson as Supervisor

== Release ==
The film was released on DVD in the United States on November 28, 2006.

== Legal action ==
The film Groundhog Day, which has a similar time loop premise, was also released in 1993. The writers and producers of 12:01 believed their work was stolen by Groundhog Day.

According to Richard Lupoff:

A brilliant young filmmaker named Jonathan Heap made a superb 30-minute version of my short story "12:01 PM". It was an Oscar nominee in 1990, and was later adapted (very loosely) into a two-hour Fox movie called 12:01. The story was also adapted—actually plagiarized—into a major theatrical film in 1993. Jonathan Heap and I were outraged and tried very hard to go after the rascals who had robbed us, but alas, the Hollywood establishment closed ranks. We were no Art Buchwald. After half a year of lawyers' conferences and emotional stress, we agreed to put the matter behind us and get on with our lives.

== See also ==
- List of films featuring time loops
