= P. D. Ouspensky =

Russian esotericist (1878–1947)

- Born: Pyotr Demyanovich Uspensky; 5 March 1878; Moscow, Russian Empire
- Died: 2 October 1947 (aged 69); Lyne Place, Surrey, England, UK

Pyotr Demyanovich Uspensky (Russian: Пётр Демьянович Успенский; 5 March 1878 – 2 October 1947), known in English as P. D. Ouspensky, was a Russian philosopher and esotericist known for his expositions of the early work of the Greek-Armenian teacher of esoteric doctrine George Gurdjieff. He met Gurdjieff in Moscow in 1915, and was associated with the ideas and practices originating with Gurdjieff from then on. He taught ideas and methods based in the Gurdjieff system for 25 years in England and the United States, although he separated from Gurdjieff personally in 1924, for reasons that are explained in the last chapter of his book In Search of the Miraculous.

Ouspensky studied the Gurdjieff system directly under Gurdjieff's own supervision for a period of ten years, from 1915 to 1924. In Search of the Miraculous recounts what he learned from Gurdjieff during those years. While lecturing in London in 1924, he announced that he would continue independently the way he had begun in 1921. Some, including his close pupil Rodney Collin, say that he finally gave up the system in 1947, just before his death, but his own recorded words on the subject ("A Record of Meetings", published posthumously) do not clearly endorse this judgement.

== Early life ==
Ouspensky was born in Moscow in 1878. In 1890, he studied at the Second Moscow Gymnasium, a government school attended by boys aged 10 to 18. At the age of 16, he was expelled from school for painting graffiti on the wall in plain sight of a visiting inspector. From then on he was more or less on his own. In 1906, he worked in the editorial office of the Moscow daily paper The Morning. In 1907 he became interested in Theosophy. In late 1913, he journeyed to the East in search of the miraculous. He visited Theosophists in Adyar in Tamil Nadu, India, but was forced to return to Moscow after the beginning of World War I. In Moscow he met Gurdjieff and married Sophie Grigorievna Maximenko. He had a mistress by the name of Anna Ilinishna Butkovsky.

== Career ==
During his years in Moscow, Ouspensky wrote for several newspapers and was particularly interested in the then-fashionable idea of the fourth dimension. His first work, published in 1909, was titled The Fourth Dimension. It was influenced by the ideas prevalent in the works of Charles H. Hinton, which treat the fourth dimension as an extension in space. Ouspensky treats time as a fourth dimension only indirectly in a novel he wrote titled Strange Life of Ivan Osokin where he also explores the theory of eternal recurrence.

Ouspensky's second work, Tertium Organum, was published in 1912. In it he denies the ultimate reality of space and time, and negates Aristotle's Logical Formula of Identification of "A is A", concluding in his "higher logic" that A is both A and not-A. Unbeknown to Ouspensky, a Russian émigré by the name of Nicholas Bessarabof took a copy of Tertium Organum to America and placed it in the hands of the architect Claude Bragdon, who could read Russian and was interested in the fourth dimension. Tertium Organum was rendered into English by Bragdon, who had incorporated his own design of the hypercube into the Rochester Chamber of Commerce building. Bragdon also published the book, and the publication was such a success that it was finally taken up by Alfred A. Knopf. At the time, in the early 1920s, Ouspensky's whereabouts were unknown. Bragdon located him in Constantinople and paid him back some royalties.

Ouspensky traveled in Europe, India, Ceylon, and Egypt in his search for knowledge. After his return to Russia and his introduction to Gurdjieff in 1915, he spent the next few years studying with him, and supporting the founding of a school.

Prior to 1914, Ouspensky had written and published a number of articles. In 1917, he updated these articles to include "recent developments in physics" and republished them as a book in Russian entitled A New Model of the Universe. The work, as reflected in its title, shows the influence of Francis Bacon and Max Müller, and has been interpreted as an attempt to reconcile ideas from natural science and religious studies with esoteric teachings in the tradition of Gurdjieff and Theosophy. It was assumed that the book was lost during the Russian Revolution, but it was subsequently republished in English without Ouspensky's knowledge in 1931. The work has attracted the interest of a number of philosophers and has been a widely accepted authoritative basis for a study of metaphysics. Ouspensky sought to exceed the limits of metaphysics with his "psychological method", which he defined as "a calibration of the tools of human understanding to derive the actual meaning of the thing itself" (paraphrasing p. 75.). According to Ouspensky, "The idea of esotericism ... holds that the very great majority of our ideas are not the product of evolution but the product of the degeneration of ideas which existed at some time or are still existing somewhere in much higher, purer and more complete forms" (p. 47). The book also provided an original discussion on the nature and expression of sexuality; among other things, he draws a distinction between erotica and pornography.

Ouspensky's lectures in London were attended by such literary figures as Aldous Huxley, T. S. Eliot, Gerald Heard and other writers, journalists and doctors. His influence on the literary scene of the 1920s and 1930s as well as on the Russian avant-garde was immense but remains very little known. It was said of Ouspensky that, though nonreligious, he had one prayer: not to become famous during his lifetime.

== Later life ==
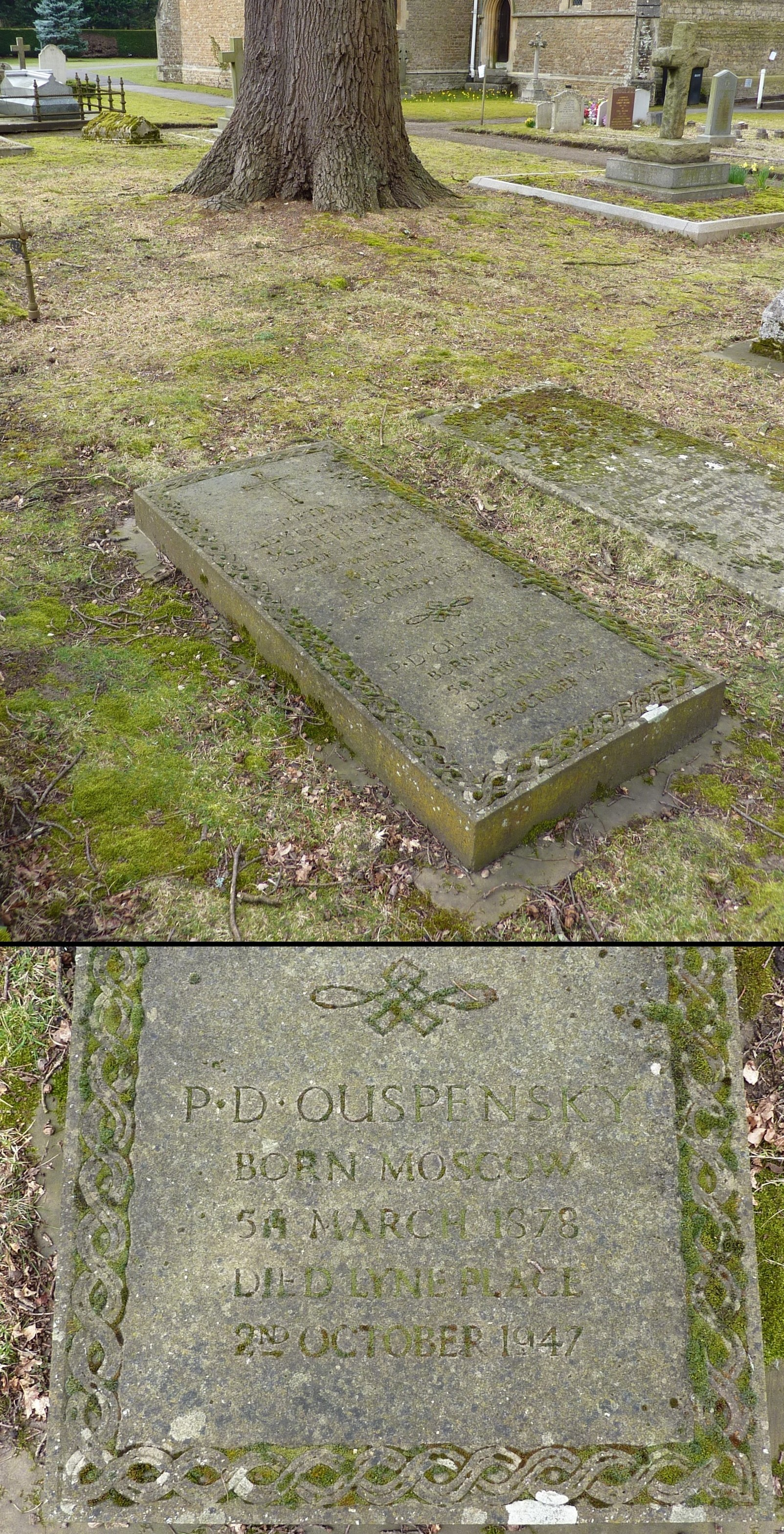
Ouspensky's grave at the Holy Trinity Church in Lyne, Surrey, England, photographed in 2013

After the Russian Revolution, Ouspensky travelled to London by way of Istanbul. A number of people in London became interested in his work. Lady Rothermere, wife of Harold Harmsworth, 1st Viscount Rothermere, a press magnate, was willing to promote Tertium Organum. The influential intellectual and editor A. R. Orage became deeply interested in Ouspensky's ideas and promoted their discussion in various circles. Prominent theosophist and editor G. R. S. Mead became interested in his ideas on the fourth dimension.

By order of the British government, Gurdjieff was not allowed to settle in London. Gurdjieff eventually went to France with a considerable sum of money raised by Ouspensky and his friends, and settled down near Paris at the Prieuré in Fontainebleau-Avon. It was during this time, after Gurdjieff founded his Institute for the Harmonious Development of Man in France, that Ouspensky came to the conclusion that he was no longer able to understand his former teacher and made a decision to discontinue association with him. He set up his own organisation, The Society for the Study of Normal Psychology, which is now known as The Study Society.

Ouspensky wrote about Gurdjieff's teachings in a book originally entitled Fragments of an Unknown Teaching, published posthumously in 1947 under the title In Search of the Miraculous. While this volume has been criticized by some of those who have followed Gurdjieff's teachings as only a partial representation of the totality of his ideas, it provides what is probably the most concise explanation of the material that was included. This is in sharp contrast to the writings of Gurdjieff himself, such as Beelzebub's Tales to His Grandson, where the ideas and precepts of Gurdjieff's teachings are found very deeply veiled in allegory. Initially, Ouspensky had intended this book to be published only if Beelzebub's Tales were not published. But after his death, Ouspensky's widow showed its draft to Gurdjieff, who praised its accuracy and permitted its publication.

Deeply affected by the commencement of the Second World War on Britain, Ouspensky emigrated, with his wife, to the U.S. They settled on a farm in New Jersey. In 1947 Ouspensky, by then a very sick man, moved back to Lyne Place, England, without his wife who strongly opposed the move back to the U.K. Ouspensky died in Lyne Place, Surrey, in 1947. Shortly after his death, The Psychology of Man's Possible Evolution was published, together with In Search of the Miraculous. A facsimile edition of In Search of the Miraculous was published in 2004 by Paul H. Crompton Ltd. London. Transcripts of some of his lectures were published under the title of The Fourth Way in 1957; largely a collection of question and answer sessions, the book details important concepts, both introductory and advanced, for students of these teachings.

Ouspensky's papers are held at Yale University Library's Manuscripts and Archives department.

== Teaching ==
After Ouspensky broke away from Gurdjieff, he taught the "Fourth Way", as he understood it, to his independent groups.

=== Fourth Way ===
Gurdjieff proposed that there are three ways of self-development generally known in esoteric circles. These are the Way of the Fakir, dealing exclusively with the physical body, the Way of the Monk, dealing with the emotions, and the Way of the Yogi, dealing with the mind. What is common to all three ways is that they demand complete seclusion from the world. According to Gurdjieff, there is a Fourth Way which does not demand its followers to abandon the world. The work of self-development takes place right in the midst of ordinary life. Gurdjieff called his system a school of the Fourth Way in which a person learns to work in harmony with his physical body, emotions and mind. Ouspensky picked up this idea and continued his own school along this line.

Ouspensky made the term "Fourth Way" and its use central to his own teaching of the ideas of Gurdjieff. He greatly focused on Fourth Way schools and their existence throughout history.

=== Students ===
Among his students were Rodney Collin, Maurice Nicoll, Robert S. de Ropp, Kenneth Walker, and Remedios Varo.

=== Self-remembering ===
Ouspensky personally confessed the difficulties he was experiencing with 'self-remembering'—the practice of a deep state of mindfulness, rooting one in the present moment, whatever one is doing. (The present definition of the term in the teachings of Advaita is “to be in awareness”, or “being aware of being aware”, while in Buddhism the corresponding practice is 'mindfulness'). 'Self-remembering' was a technique to which Ouspensky had been introduced by Gurdjieff himself, the teacher having explained to him that self-remembering is the key to all else in ‘the Work’. While in Russia, Ouspensky experimented with the technique with a certain degree of success, and in his lectures in London and America he emphasized the importance of its practice. The technique requires a division of attention, so that a person not only pays attention to what is going on in the exterior world but also in the interior. A. L. Volinsky, an acquaintance of Ouspensky in Russia, mentioned to him that this was what Wundt meant by apperception. Ouspensky disagreed and commented on how an idea so profound to him would pass unnoticed by people whom he considered intelligent. Gurdjieff explained that in order to bring about a result or manifestation, three things are necessary. With self-remembering and self-observation two things are present. The third one is explained by Ouspensky in his tract on Conscience: it is the non-expression of negative emotions.

== Published works ==
- Ouspensky, P. D. (1909). The Fourth Dimension. St. Petersburg.
- Tertium Organum: The Third Canon of Thought, a Key to the Enigmas of the World (1912). Translated from the Russian by Nicholas Bessaraboff and Claude Bragdon. Rochester, New York: Manas Press, 1920; Online version.
- The Symbolism of the Tarot, First Edition, Russian, 1913; New York: Dover Publications Inc., 1976. (Translated by A. L. Pogossky) Online version.
- A New Model of the Universe: Principles of the Psychological Method in Its Application to Problems of Science, Religion and Art. (Russian, 1914); Translated from the Russian by R. R. Merton, under the supervision of the author. New York: Knopf, 1931; London: Routledge, 1931; 2nd revised edition, London: Routledge, 1934; New York: Knopf, 1934.
- Talks with a Devil (Russian, 1916). Tr. by Katya Petroff, edited with an introduction by J. G. Bennett. Northamptonshire: Turnstone, 1972, ISBN 0-85500-004-X (HC); New York: Knopf, 1973; York Beach: Weiser, 2000, ISBN 1-57863-164-5.
- The Psychology of Man's Possible Evolution. New York: Hedgehog Press, 1950.
- Strange Life of Ivan Osokin. New York and London: Holme, 1947; London: Faber & Faber, 1948; first published in Russian as Kinemadrama (St. Petersburg, 1915). Online (Russian).
- The Psychology of Man's Possible Evolution (1945). Online.
- In Search of the Miraculous: Fragments of an Unknown Teaching. New York: Harcourt, Brace, 1949; London: Routledge, 1947.
- In Search of the Miraculous: Fragments of an Unknown Teaching London, Paul H. Crompton Ltd 2010 facsimile edition of the 1949 edition, hardcover.
- The Fourth Way: A Record of Talks and Answers to Questions Based on the Teaching of G. I. Gurdjieff (Prepared under the general supervision of Sophia Ouspensky). New York: Knopf, 1957; London: Routledge & Kegan Paul, 1957.
- Letters from Russia, 1919 (Introduction by Fairfax Hall and epilog from In Denikin's Russia by C. E. Bechhofer). London and New York: Arkana, 1978.
- Conscience: The Search for Truth. Introduction by Merrily E. Taylor. London: Routledge & Kegan Paul, 1979.
- A Further Record: Extracts from Meetings 1928–1945. London and New York: Arkana, 1986.
- The Psychology of Man's Possible Evolution and The Cosmology of Man's possible Evolution, a limited edition of the definitive text of his Psychological and Cosmological Lectures, 1934–1945. Agora Books, East Sussex, 1989. ISBN 1-872292-00-3.
- P. D. Ouspensky Memorial Collection, Yale University Library. Archive notes taken from meetings during 1935–1947.
