= Salvage (2006 film) =

- Directed by: Joshua Crook, Jeffrey Crook
- Written by: Joshua Crook, Jeffrey Crook
- Release date: 2006
- Running time: 79 minutes
- Country: United States
- Language: English
- Budget: $200,000

Salvage is a 2006 horror film by the Crook Brothers, Jeffrey Crook and Joshua Crook. It was an official selection of the 2006 Sundance Festival. According to the directors' commentary, the film was shot for around $200,000. It stars Lauren Currie Lewis as Claire Parker, Cody Darbe as her boyfriend Jimmy, and Chris Ferry as Duke Desmond.

== Plot ==
Claire is ending her night shift at a convenience store. She expects her boyfriend to arrive to drive her home, but instead, someone else, who identifies himself as Duke, is driving her boyfriend's truck. After an unsettling ride home during which Duke makes increasingly overt sexual comments about her, Claire closes herself into the safety of her house.

Duke appears at her door, claiming she has dropped an earring. Claire refuses to let him in, and he drops the earring on her front porch and leaves. Claire spends several moments crouched in the doorway retrieving the earring, but upon retrieving it and pulling the door closed, her back door has swung open. Duke has entered the house from the rear. He brutally murders her.

Claire awakens at the convenience store again, and all seems well. She decides that she has had a nightmare. As her shift ends, her boyfriend arrives, and she goes home and to school.

At home, Claire takes a bath, and dozes off, but is jolted awake by the bathroom door opening on its own. She gets up to investigate, and hears noises in the basement. She haltingly goes into the dark basement, to find her mother staring at the wall. Her mother says she's "looking for something."

While driving with Jimmy, Claire sees a man burying something in a field. At home, after showering, she sees a blurry reflection of a man in the mirror instead of herself. And she has visions of Desmond being chased in the woods by police and dogs. Later at work, she again dozes. Once again she sees the vision of Desmond running in the woods, this time taking shelter in a cabin in the woods. Desmond is surprised by Detective Miller, who shoots him dead.

Claire awakens to see Desmond in the convenience store video monitor. She presses the button for 911, but then Desmond overpowers her and starts strangling her. Claire fights for her life, gouging out Desmond's eyes. But he continues choking her, saying, "Not yet." The police arrive and Desmond escapes.

At the police station, Claire tells her story to the cops, who laugh. Detective Miller then shows Claire the CCTV footage, where there is no Desmond, no attack, just Claire seemingly fighting herself. Detective Miller then reveals he had shot and killed Desmond a week earlier. He tells her that Desmond had kidnapped and murdered two teenagers. Claire thinks she's going insane.

As the cops drive her home, she falls asleep. She wakes up in Desmond's truck, alone, near the same field where she saw the man burying something. Jimmy is shown being killed by Desmond, who then approaches the truck and loads Jimmy's corpse into the back. Claire can't get out before Desmond gets in. He takes her home, and tries to comfort her. When she keeps saying, "this isnt' real," Desmond tells her, "The only real thing is what you feel."

Once in the house, the murder scene repeats, with Desmond killing her and cutting off her face. The loop repeats. Claire wakes up in the convenience store, she goes home, she is murdered by Desmond.

Upon realizing she's in a loop, she decides to do something different. She walks home instead of getting a ride with Jimmy. She walks past the field, and sees Desmond driving away. Later, she falls asleep in class, and again sees Desmond murdering Jimmy. Later she tells Jimmy about her visions. The couple take refuge in a church. The janitor there tells them that Desmond is dead, and he can't hurt them, as he is in hell. Claire and Jimmy decide to visit Desmond's house and look for clues. Desmond, clearly alive, shows up and shoots Jimmy and loads his corpse in his truck and leaves.

Claire goes to the library and researches Desmond's life. She finds a news article that says she and Jimmy had been kidnapped a month previous, and Jimmy's body had been found in a field, but Claire was still missing, but presumed dead. Claire visits the field where she'd earlier seen a man burying something, and finds her own cut off face. Desmond arrives, and Claire runs off.

Claire goes to her friend Tina's house, and collapses in a chair from exhaustion while Tina calls the police. Claire again dreams of Desmond, where Detective Miller shoots Desmond dead at his cabin.

When Claire awakens, she hears her friend telling someone, "He is catching on, he will soon get used to it." Claire walks out of the room, only to see Tina talking to Desmond. Claire escapes through a window.

Claire steals Desmond's truck and returns home to find her mother screaming for help in the basement. Her mother tells her, "Don't you get it? You have to relive what you did." Desmond steps out of the darkness, and it's revealed that Duke Desmond is indeed in hell, and his punishment is to relive Claire's terror and death over and over, AS HER, for eternity. The man we've been seeing terrorizing Claire is revealed to be Satan, and he slices off "Claire's" face.

Just before the end credits, Desmond (as Claire) again awakens in the convenience store.

== Cast ==
- Lauren Currie Lewis as Claire Parker, a convenience store worker and college student who relieves the same day after being killed
- Cody Darbe as Jimmy, Claire's boyfriend
- Chris Ferry as Duke Desmond, Claire's murderer
- Maureen Olander as Claire's Mother
- John P. Miller as Detective Miller
- Jessica DeLong as Jen, one of Claire's friends
- Sam Dahler as Sam, another friend of Claire
- John Briley as the Custodian
- Joseph M. Colombo as the Professor, a college professor of Claire

== Music ==
Composer Evan Wilson provided the original score for the movie. Additional music is provided by Devola, a group from the Ohio area (themselves named after a geographic location) where the film was shot.

== Production ==
According to the directors' commentary, the film was shot entirely with digital video, accounting for the greatly reduced budget of the film. Additionally, the credits reveal that the cast served many "crew" roles, with Lauren Lewis responsible for hair and makeup. There has been no apparent theatrical release of the film, but it is available in DVD release.

== Home media ==
Released on DVD as Gruesome in Australia and in the UK.

== Reception ==
On review aggregator Rotten Tomatoes, the film has an approval rating of 29% based on 7 reviews, with an average rating of 4.6/10.

== See also ==
- Happy Death Day 2U
- Happy Death Day
- List of films featuring time loops
