= Über =

German word meaning "above"

Über (German pronunciation: [ˈyːbɐ], sometimes misspelled uber /ˈuːbər/ in English-language publications) is a German language word meaning "over", "above" or "across". It is an etymological twin with German ober, and is a cognate (through Proto-Germanic) with English over, Dutch over, Swedish över and Icelandic yfir, among other Germanic languages; it is a distant cognate to the Sanskrit word ūpari and Hindi ūpar (both meaning 'above', 'over' or 'up'), probably through Proto-Indo-European. The word is relatively well known within Anglophone communities due to its occasional use as a hyphenated prefix in informal English, usually for emphasis. The German word is properly spelled with an umlaut, while the spelling of the English loanword varies.

== In German ==
In German, über is a preposition, as well as being used as a prefix. Both uses indicate a state or action involving increased elevation or quantity in the physical sense, or superiority or excess in the abstract.

elevation: "überdacht" - roof-covered, roofed, [also: reconsidered, thought over] (überdacht (from Dach (roof)) means roof-covered, roofed while überdacht (from the strong verb denken-[dachte, gedacht] (think, thought, thought) means reconsidered, thought over)
quantity: "über 100 Meter" - more than 100 meters, "Überschall" - supersonic
superiority: "überlegen" - (adj) superior, elite, predominant. (verb) to think something over
excess: "übertreiben" - to exaggerate, "überfüllt" - overcrowded)

As a preposition, über's meaning depends on its context. For example, über etwas sprechen – to speak about something, über die Brücke – across the bridge.

Über also translates to over, above, meta, but mainly in compound words. The actual translation depends on context. One example would be Nietzsche's term Übermensch, discussed below; another example is the Deutschlandlied, which begins with the well-known words "Deutschland, Deutschland über alles" meaning "Germany, Germany above everything" (this stanza is not sung anymore, because it is mistaken as meaning "Germany above the rest of the world"; its original meaning was the German nation above its constituent states [Prussia, Hanover, Württemberg etc.]).

The German word unter, meaning beneath or under, is antonymous to über. Unter can be found in words such as U-Bahn (Untergrundbahn – underground (rail-)way), U-Boot (Unterseeboot – submarine, lit. "under sea boat"), as well as toponyms, such as Unter den Linden ("Below the linden trees").

Grammatically, über belongs to that set of German prepositions that can govern either the accusative case or the dative case ("an, auf, hinter, in, neben, über, unter, vor, zwischen"). The choice is determined by whether the prepositional phrase indicates movement (accusative) or an unmoving state (dative).

== In English ==
=== Origins ===
The crossover of the term "über" from German into English goes back to the work of German philosopher Friedrich Nietzsche. In 1883, Nietzsche coined the term "Übermensch" to describe the higher state to which he felt men might aspire. The term was brought into English by George Bernard Shaw in the title to his 1903 play Man and Superman. During his rise to power, Adolf Hitler adopted Nietzsche's term, using it in his descriptions of an Aryan master race. It was in this context that American Jewish comic book creator Jerry Siegel encountered the term and conceived the 1933 story "The Reign of the Superman", in which the mentally advanced superman (not to be confused with his later superhero character) is a villain. Shortly afterward, Siegel and artist Joseph Shuster recast Superman into the iconic American hero he subsequently became. It is through this association with the superhero that the term "über" carries much of its English sense implying irresistibility or invincibility.

=== Differences from the German ===
==== Spelling ====
The normal transliteration of the “ü” (‘u’ with an umlaut) when used in writing systems without diacritics (such as airport arrival boards, older computer systems, etc.) is “ue”, not just “u”.

==== Meaning ====
Because of different usage, the English language version of the word is distinct from “über”. It is not possible to translate every English "uber" back into "über": for example, "uber-left" could not be translated into "Überlinks": a Germanophone would say “linksaußen” (literally “outer left”, meaning a left-winger in either sports or politics).

== See also ==
- Metal umlaut
- Uberfic
