= Randian hero =

Ubiquitous figure in Ayn Rand's fiction

The Randian hero is a ubiquitous figure in the fiction of 20th-century novelist and philosopher Ayn Rand, most famously in the figures of The Fountainhead's Howard Roark and Atlas Shrugged's John Galt. Rand's self-declared purpose in writing fiction was to project an "ideal man"—a man who perseveres to achieve his values, and only his values.

== Philosophical foundation ==
As a conception of the ideal man, the Randian hero has much in common with Aristotle's conception of agathos, in that both are morally heroic and heroically rational. The philosophers share a similar naturalist/objectivist meta-ethical perspective emphasizing character as the primary determinant of moral worth, and possess a fundamentally heroic attitude towards life. The Randian hero exemplifies ethical egoism, the normative ethical position that the rational self-interest of the individual ought to be the basis for moral action. The specific virtues of the Randian hero, like the Aristotelian ideal, are created from rationality, the primary virtue; rationality is the hero's basic tool of survival, to be exercised at all times. The primary value, the "highest moral purpose", is happiness (cf. eudaimonia). For an ideal man, according to this philosophy, happiness is achieved through the accomplishment of his goals, goals chosen because of his values, values he finds through logic. Rand frequently declared her motive and purpose in writing to be "the projection of an ideal man"; all of her protagonists are heroes.

== Characteristics ==
The archetype of the Randian hero is the creative individualist. Though Rand rejected the notion that individuals have duty towards one another, her heroes are marked by an essential generosity, for the reason that they act out of compassion and empathy rather than guilt. Rand's fiction displays a self-consciously Promethean sense of life, declaring through her characters the heroic value of self-assertion in the face of the established order.

Generally a Randian hero is characterized by radical individualism, moral resolution, intelligence/aptitude, self-control, emotional discipline, and (frequently, but not always) attractive physical characteristics in the eyes of other Randian heroes. Rand's heroes are tall, strong and upright; the females share slender figures, defiant stances and the impression of internal calmness, while the males are physically hard and supple, often with gray eyes. Jerome Tuccille described U.S. President Gerald Ford as physically exemplifying the Randian hero—"tall, blond, clear-eyed, ruggedly handsome and well-built".

Marxist philosopher Slavoj Žižek situates the Randian hero in Rand's fiction in the "standard masculine narrative" of the conflict between the exceptional, creative individual (the Master) and the undifferentiated conformist crowd. He does not consider the Randian hero to be phallocratic, arguing that these "upright, uncompromising masculine figures with a will of steel" in effect emerge as the feminine subject liberated from the hysteria of entanglement in the desire of the Other to a "being of pure drive" indifferent towards it.

Author Stephen Newman compares the Randian hero to the concept of the Übermensch created by philosopher Friedrich Nietzsche, saying that "the Randian hero is really Nietzsche's superman in the guise of the entrepreneur".

== Specific instances ==
Although the archetype of the Randian hero appears in Rand's earliest work (notably in Night of January 16th's Bjorn Faulkner and We the Living's Leo Kovalensky), its best known examples appear in Rand's mature work, specifically from the novella Anthem (1938) onward.

=== Anthem ===
Anthem, set in a dystopian future where free will has been eliminated and individual excellence is considered a disease, is told through the eyes of Equality 7–2521, a man with a quick and inquisitive mind who is forced by the leaders of his collectivist society to work as a street sweeper. Witnessing a rebel being burned at the stake, Equality recognizes a common spirit. In defiance of the edicts followed by his fellows, he manages to rediscover electricity, a technology that had been lost by the dystopian society of the story. He and his lover flee the collectivist society, renaming each other "The Unconquered" and "The Golden One" respectively, and together they build a stronghold of individualism from which they and like-minded individuals can begin their struggle for freedom.

=== The Fountainhead ===
Ayn Rand created the Randian hero in earnest in the character of Howard Roark in The Fountainhead. An architect, Roark conflicts with his profession's establishment on multiple occasions. The early stages of the novel begin with Roark being expelled from university because he refused to design in traditional styles. Throughout his career, he refuses to design according to any vision apart from his own. The architects' professional body scorns him for not paying "proper respect" to tradition, yet in the end, he triumphs.

=== Atlas Shrugged ===
The protagonist of Atlas Shrugged is Dagny Taggart, described by Rand as "the feminine Roark". Atlas Shrugged introduces several Randian heroes, both in the backstory and in the primary narrative. In the story, they personify the intellect—their withdrawal from the world under the leadership of John Galt parallels the world's gradual collapse.

In considering the character of Dagny Taggart as Randian hero, scholar Edward Younkins remarked that while she evoked passion and admiration, she was inspirational rather than motivational. Younkins found the concept of the Randian hero appealing, but out of reach for someone without Taggart's clear context for action. Rand's novels depict a world where anyone can be excellent out of choice alone, which Younkins argued was in tension "with the knowledge that we do not transcend our context … and that context is almost always owned by the crowd".

== Influence and criticism ==
As Rand's fiction and non-academic philosophical works became popular especially in the 1980s, her fans would often claim that attributes of these heroes could be found in themselves, or should be.

Early self-esteem psychologist Nathaniel Branden, the most prominent of Rand's initial adopters, later renounced aspects of objectivist literature and acknowledged "the accusation that we are against feelings, against emotions" as well as other criticisms of such a celebration of ultra-rationalism being dangerous:

If, in page after page of The Fountainhead and Atlas Shrugged, you show someone being heroic by ruthlessly setting feelings aside, and if you show someone being rotten and depraved by, in effect, diving headlong into his feelings and emotions, and if that is one of your dominant methods of characterization, repeated again and again, then it doesn't matter what you profess, in abstract philosophy, about the relationship of reason and emotion. You have taught people: repress, repress, repress.

== See also ==
- Romantic hero
