= Kenneth Walker (author) =

British author (1882–1966)

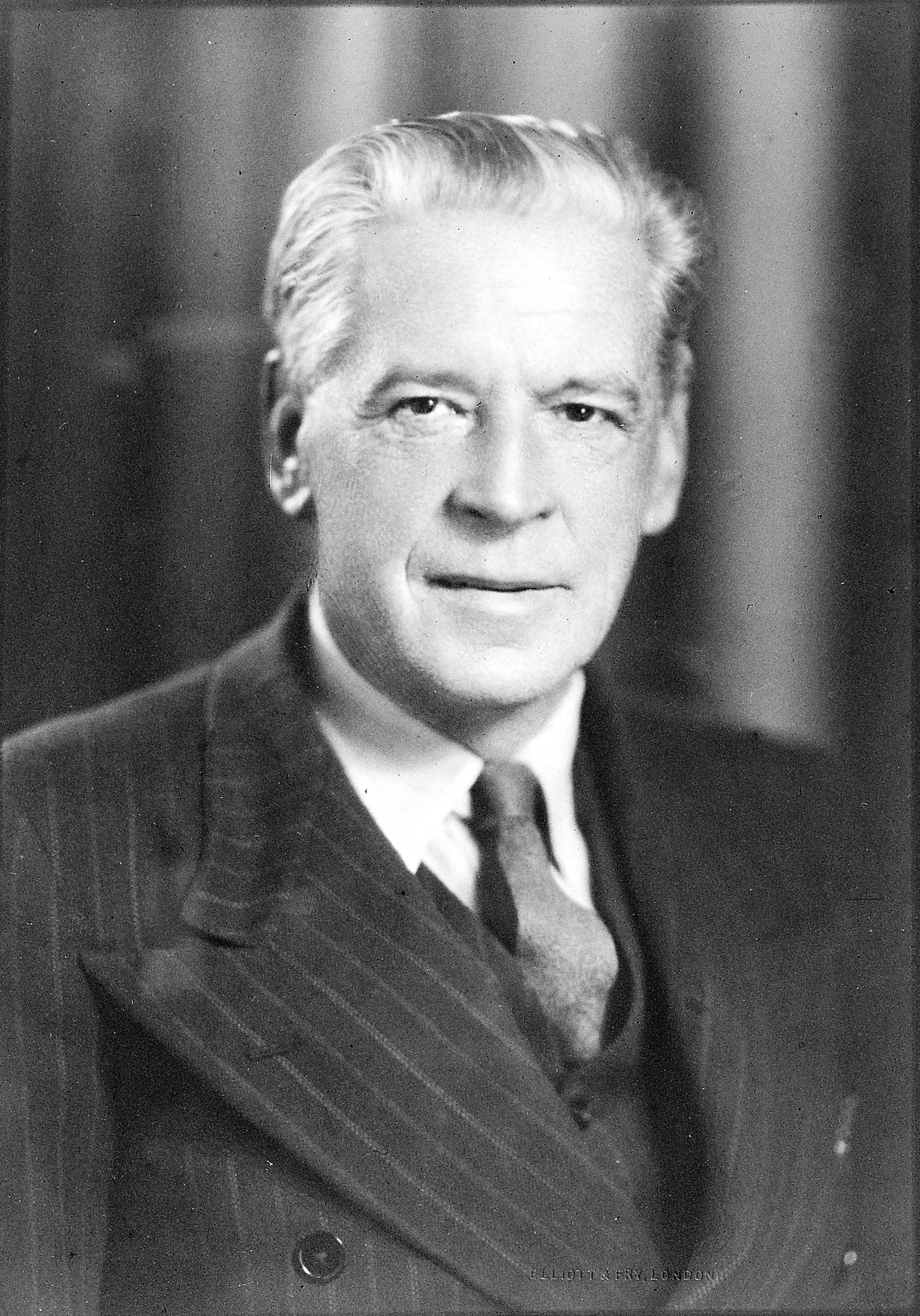
- Born: 6 June 1882; Hampstead, London, England
- Died: 22 January 1966 (aged 83)
- Education: The Leys School; Caius College, Cambridge
- Medical career
- Field: Urology
- Institutions: St. Bartholomew's Hospital

Kenneth Macfarlane Walker (6 June 1882 – 22 January 1966) was a British author, philosopher and urological surgeon.

== Biography ==
Walker was born in Hampstead, London. He was educated at The Leys School and Gonville and Caius College, Cambridge. He studied at Cambridge University and the Royal College of Surgeons. He served as captain in the Royal Army Medical Corps (1915–1919). He took the F.R.C.S. in 1908 and was awarded the Jacksonian Prize in 1910 for his essay on tuberculosis of the bladder. He worked as a surgeon at St. Bartholomew's Hospital and was emeritus surgeon at Royal Northern Hospital.

Walker authored many books. He wrote The Log of the Ark with Geoffrey Boumphrey in 1923. He was the author of Meaning and Purpose (1944), an analysis of the main scientific theories of the last hundred years and their impact upon religious thought and belief. It aimed at questioning the completeness of Charles Darwin's theory of natural selection and evolution, as well as evaluating the most relevant scientific discoveries at the time of publication and their effect on the general population. He also attacked mechanistic accounts of the universe and natural selection in his book Life's Long Journey (1961).

He studied the ideas and methods of George Gurdjieff with P. D. Ouspensky, and when the latter died in 1947 he visited Gurdjieff himself in Paris. He contributed thoughtful pieces to the Picture Post, a highly popular publication, and was referred to by a friend as 'The Sage of Picture Post.' He conducted study groups in the Gurdjieff Society London. Among his books are A Study of Gurdjieff's Teaching, and Venture with Ideas. His writing style was simple and direct.

Walker was also interested in parapsychology. In his book The Extra-Sensory Mind he supported the controversial claims of radionics, a form of alternative medicine.

== Publications ==
- The Log of the Ark (1923) [with Geoffrey Boumphrey]
- Sex and a changing civilisation (1935)
- Diagnosis of Man (1942)
- The Circle of Life: A Search for an Attitude to Pain, Disease, Old Age and Death (1942)
- I Talk of Dreams: An Experiment in Autobiography (1946)
- Meaning and Purpose (1944, 1950)
- Commentary on Age (1952)
- Ventures with Ideas: Meetings with Gurdjieff and Ouspensky (1952)
- Living Your Later Years (1954)
- Sexual Disorders in the Male (1954) [with Eric Benjamin Strauss]
- The Physiology of Sex and Its Social Implications (1954)
- The Physiology of Sex (1954)
- Sex and Society: A Psychological Study of Sexual Behaviour in a Competitive Culture (1955) [with Peter Fletcher]
- The Story of Medicine (1955)

"Joseph Lister" (1956)

- The Story of Blood (1958)
- The Extra-Sensory Mind (1961)
- Life's Long Journey (1961)
- The Conscious Mind: A Commentary on the Mystics (1962)
- Human Physiology (1963)
- The Making of Man (1963)
- Sex and Society (1964)
- A Study of Gurdjieff's Teaching (1965)
- The Mystic Mind (1965)
