= List of films featuring time loops =

This list of films featuring time loops in which characters experience the same period of time which is repeatedly resetting: when a certain condition is met, such as a death of a character or a clock reaches a certain time, the loop starts again, with one or more characters retaining the memories from the previous loop. The list provides the names and brief synopses of films in which time loops are a prominent plot device.

For a list of films that include any kind of time travel (including time loops) see time travel in films.

Films with time loops
Title	Year	Country	Description
Je t'aime, je t'aime	1968	France	A man is subjected by a group of scientists to an experiment where he experiences past events in his life over and over again.
The Girl Who Leapt Through Time	1983	Japan	Feature film based on Yasutaka Tsutsui's 1965 novel of the same name. The story is about a Japanese schoolgirl who accidentally gains the ability to time travel, which she experiments with and attempts to alter past events, leading her on a journey through multiple time loops.
Urusei Yatsura 2: Beautiful Dreamer	1984	Japan	The students of Tomobiki high school relive the day before the school festival over and over.
Mirror for a Hero	1987	Russia	Zerkalo dlya geroya, a Soviet Union film by Vladimir Khotinenko. Two heroes circle multiple times in 1949, adapting to the harsh post-war life, meeting the parents of one of them, finally returning to the present time, having reassessed their attitude towards elders.
12:01 PM	1990	USA	This short film is the first film adaptation of the short story "12:01 PM" by Richard A. Lupoff, which was published in 1973 in The Magazine of Fantasy and Science Fiction. It originally aired on cable television as part of the Showtime 30-Minute Movie anthology series. It was nominated for an Academy Award.
12:01	1993	USA	The second film adaptation of the short story "12:01 PM" by Richard A. Lupoff, which was published in 1973 in The Magazine of Fantasy and Science Fiction. Office worker Barry Thomas is forced to relive the worst day of his life.
Groundhog Day	1993	USA	Self-centered television weatherman Phil Connors (Bill Murray) is forced to relive the same day over and over. This movie is generally seen as the quintessential time-loop movie by many and its name is synonymous with the genre as a whole.
Christmas Every Day	1996	USA	An American television movie based on William Dean Howells's 1892 short story "Christmas Every Day". A selfish teenager is forced to relive the same Christmas every day.
Retroactive	1997	USA	A psychiatrist makes multiple trips through time to save a woman who was murdered by her husband.
Run Lola Run	1998	Germany	The story follows a woman named Lola (Franka Potente) who needs to obtain 100,000 Deutschmarks in twenty minutes to save the life of her boyfriend by resetting time multiple times by 20 minutes.
Mickey's Once Upon a Christmas	1999	USA	Huey, Dewey, and Louie must repeat Christmas Day until they come to learn the true meaning of Christmas.
Naked	2000	Sweden	On his wedding day, he wakes up naked in an elevator. As he attempts to piece together the reason for this predicament, the day repeats itself, and he becomes stuck in a time loop.
Camp Slaughter	2005	USA	A group of present-day teenagers are sent back to 1981, and discover a summer camp which is stuck reliving the day a demented killer went on a rampage.
Salvage	2006	USA	Claire encounters horror and murder after finishing a day working at a convenience store, not once but many times. An official selection of the 2006 Sundance Festival.
Timecrimes	2007	Spain	A man unwittingly becomes part of a causal loop and must stop his other selves from continuing to exist.
The Last Day of Summer	2007	USA	11-year-old Luke gets his wish that every day could be the last day of summer.
Frequently Asked Questions About Time Travel	2009	USA; United Kingdom	Three social misfits navigate a time-travel conundrum originating from their local pub.
Triangle	2009	United Kingdom; Australia	A group of friends go on a boat trip and become stranded due to a storm. They discover a cruise ship which causes them to experience a series of repeating events.
Dark Country	2009	USA	A newly married couple drives through the desert from Las Vegas when they encounter a person who was just in an accident. They take him and try to find some help, but are now part of a time loop.
Alf Mabrouk	2010	Egypt	Ahmed Galal (Ahmed Helmy), an irresponsible, egotistical accountant who is forced to repeat his wedding day.
Repeaters	2010	Canada	A group of inmates at a rehabilitation facility are forced to repeat the same day over and over.
Source Code	2011	USA; France	U.S. Army Aviation pilot Captain Colter Stevens repeatedly experiences the last eight minutes of another person's life to identify the bomber in a terrorist attack in order to prevent a second, nuclear attack on Chicago.
The Road	2011	Philippines	A group of teens finally work up the fortitude to explore a rural road, that has all the warning signs of being a bad idea.
12 Dates of Christmas	2011	USA	Kate finds herself reliving Christmas Eve (including a blind date with a man named Miles) over and over. She must discover how to break the cycle – should she attempt to win back her ex-boyfriend Jack, should she pursue Miles, or something else?
41	2012	Australia	Aidan learns of a time portal which allows travel 12 hours into the past. Aidan still longs for Lauren, the love of his life who left him, and offers her a ride home one night; but he crashes the car and she dies. Now he will try anything to fix the day and save her... unless he decides to save another great love who was lost instead. Winner for Best Feature Film at the Rhode Island International Film Festival and the Golden Ace Award at the Las Vegas Film Festival.
Puella Magi Madoka Magica: The Movie	2012	Japan	Homura Akemi has the ability to travel 30 days back in time, and has done so countless times. Each month, Homura fails in her attempts to save Madoka Kaname from destruction, and is forced to relive the tragedy of losing Madoka.
Mine Games	2012	USA	A group of friends vacationing in the woods discover their own corpses and realize they are trapped in a time loop that they attempt to break.
Blood Punch	2013	USA	A trio visits a remote cabin for a one-time criminal endeavor and finds each member independently reliving the same day.
Haunter	2013	Canada	The ghost of a teenager, Lisa Johnson (Abigail Breslin), who, along with her family, keeps reliving the same day (although she is the only one aware of it) tries to protect a young girl, Olivia (Eleanor Zichy), and her family from a dead serial killer, the Pale Man (Stephen McHattie), who can possess the living.
Oru Kanniyum Moonu Kalavaanikalum	2014	India	A group of friends find themselves in a time loop with 3 different time slots for the same incident and the result will vary due to the time and the result of people mood.
Premature	2014	USA	Rob, a high school senior, has to relive losing his virginity over and over until he gets it right, with the right girl.
The Incident	2014	Mexico	Two stories of groups trapped in infinite time and space loops. One, an endless staircase, the other, an endless road, both looping back on themselves. While time resets in their surroundings each day, the trapped characters continue to age within the loops.
The Infinite Man	2014	Australia	After a romantic weekend break with his girlfriend goes awry, a scientist invents time travel in order to create for her the perfect getaway, but inadvertently traps her in a recurring temporal loop.
Edge of Tomorrow	2014	USA	Maj. William "Bill" Cage (Tom Cruise) and Special Forces soldier Rita Vrataski (Emily Blunt) team up to fight a hostile alien race known as Mimics, with Cage continually returning to a repeating battle through a time loop.
Magnetic	2015	USA	Alice is stuck in a time loop, repeating each week, trying to find a way to prevent the Earth from being destroyed by a massive solar flare.
The Final Girls	2015	USA	A group of friends find themselves trapped in an '80s horror movie that restarts every 92 minutes.
ARQ	2016	USA; Canada	An engineer, whose invention causes time to loop during a home invasion, attempts to save his former lover while learning who has targeted him and why.
Doctor Strange	2016	USA	Aided by the powers of The Eye of Agamotto, Stephen Strange traps himself and Dormammu in a time loop in order to bargain against him consuming the Earth.
Erased	2016	Japan	A Japanese young man travels back in time to prevent the murder of his mother and others, looping through different versions of reality as his actions change the past. (The same basic story exists in manga, anime, live action movie, and live action TV series versions.)
Groundhog Day for a Black Man	2016	USA	Short film about a black man who keeps reliving the same day in which he ends up being shot by a police officer. The director of this film accused Netflix's Two Distant Strangers of plagiarism.
Miss Peregrine's Home for Peculiar Children	2016	United Kingdom; USA	Jake visits the ruins of an orphanage that was destroyed by a bombing raid during World War II and discovers that the original inhabitants survived by creating a time loop set to repeat the day of September 2, 1943.
Naked	2017	USA	Rob is caught in a time loop as he keeps waking up naked in a hotel elevator on his wedding day.
Happy Death Day	2017	USA	A college student is murdered on her birthday, Monday the 18th. She wakes up the morning of the 18th, alive, facing the same day over and over, while also getting weaker. She must figure out who her killer is in order to escape the loop.
Before I Fall	2017	USA	A popular high school senior finds herself reliving the same day over and over.
The Endless	2017	USA	Two brothers return to a cult that is stuck in a time loop.
A Day	2017	Korea	A father attempts to save his daughter whilst stuck in an endless time loop.
Reset	2017	China	A physicist uses an experimental wormhole machine to travel to parallel universes and back in time by an hour, trying to save her kidnapped son.
The Fare	2018	USA	A taxi driver and his passenger find themselves locked in an endless time loop as they have to repeat their journey over and over.
When We First Met	2018	USA	A guy's grief over losing Ms. Right, grief he recovers from by time traveling to earn that magic "reset."
Time Loop	2019	Italy	A father and son invent a time travelling machine in Italy, but things go wrong when the son is pushed into the time machine, creating a time paradox loop that might never end.
Koko-di Koko-da	2019	Denmark; Sweden	A struggling couple on a camping trip is caught in a time loop where they are tormented by a group of fairy-tale characters.
Game Over	2019	India	Swapna, a wheelchair user, is defending her home from a mysterious intruder. Every time she is killed by the intruder, she awakens to the start of the day. However, the concept is more along the lines of how a video game works.
The Obituary of Tunde Johnson	2019	USA	A gay African-American teenager repeatedly relives the day of his fatal shooting in an unprovoked police brutality incident.
Happy Death Day 2U	2019	USA	Immediately after the events of the first film (Happy Death Day), Tree Gelbman (Jessica Rothe) unexpectedly re-enters the time loop except this time in an alternate reality.
The Incredible Shrinking Wknd	2019	Spain	During a countryside trip with friends and after a breakup, Alba find herself in a time loop that is getting shorter.
See You Yesterday	2019	USA	An ambitious science prodigy uses her prowess and capabilities to create time machines, in order to save her brother who has been killed by a police officer. As she tries to alter the events of the past, she will eventually face the perilous consequences of time travel.
Volition	2019	Canada	A man afflicted with clairvoyance tries to change his fate when a series of events leads to a vision of his own imminent murder.
Two Distant Strangers	2020	USA	An American short science-fiction film that examines the deaths of black Americans during encounters with police through the eyes of a character trapped in a time loop that keeps ending in his death.
Palm Springs	2020	USA	When carefree Nyles and reluctant maid of honor Sarah have a chance encounter at a Palm Springs wedding, things get complicated the next morning when they find themselves unable to escape the venue, themselves, or each other.
Boss Level	2021	USA	A retired special forces officer is trapped in a time loop on the day of his death.
Christmas...Again?!	2021	USA	A holiday Disney Channel Original Movie starring Scarlett Estevez as Ro, whose Christmas wish goes awry as she finds herself living Christmas Day over and over again.
Churuli	2021	India	Two undercover police officers who go in search of a wanted criminal named Mayiladumparambil Joy. However, they get stuck in the village of Churuli as eerie mysteries unfold.
El Ascensor	2021	Argentina	On their fifth wedding anniversary, Sitio and Ana start arguing inside an elevator that keeps opening in their same floor. Emotionally and physically trapped, the two will have to work together to find a way out.
Jango	2021	India	A neurosurgeon who is stuck in a time loop tries to save his estranged wife from being killed by a mystery man.
Maanaadu	2021	India	A man who is stuck in a time loop tries to stop a political rally from taking place in order to save the state's chief minister and prevent religious violence.
The Map of Tiny Perfect Things	2021	USA	Two teens live the same day repeatedly, enabling them to create the titular map.
Last Train to Christmas	2021	United Kingdom	A nightclub manager is trapped on a train in which the next carriage takes him forward in time by 10 years, and the previous carriage takes him back a decade. He must change history to avoid a recurring bad outcome.
Meet Cute	2022	USA	A Manhattan-native, Sheila, discovers a time machine in a nail salon and uses it to continually fix elements of a date she had the previous night.
Mondays: See You 'This' Week!	2022	Japan	The staff of an advertising agency office are stuck in a time loop except their boss.
Vandits	2022	Canada	A group of incompetent criminals tries to rob a bingo hall, only to get trapped in a time loop in which they repeatedly stage the heist but fail in a different way each time.
Zanox	2022	Hungary	Misi, a high school student, relives his graduation day after he discovers his experimental medication has a weird side effect.
Looop Lapeta	2022	India	Official adaptation of German film Run Lola Run.
River	2023	Japan	A group of people in a Japanese hospice get caught in a repeating two-minute loop.
Round and Round	2023	USA	Rachel's stuck in a time loop, reliving the night of her parents' Hanukkah party.
Dreadful Chapters	2023	India	Indian Malayalam-language horror film directed by Nirmal Baby Varghese.
Love Stuck	2024	Thailand; USA	Thai remake of The Map of Tiny Perfect Things.
The Present	2024	USA	A young boy comes across an inherited grandfather clock and soon realizes it has the power to turn back time by 12 hours.
Omni Loop	2024	USA	A woman from Miami, Florida decides to solve time travel in order to go back and be the person she always intended to.
Until Dawn	2025	USA	A group of friends find themselves trapped in a time loop where they are hunted and killed over and over, unable to survive until dawn or escape.
Bhool Chuk Maaf	2025	India	A man is stuck in a time loop the day before his wedding.
One More Shot	2025	Australia	On New Year's Eve of 1999, a woman discovers a bottle of time-travelling tequila with each shot taking her back to the start of the night. With this, she tries to get back with her former boyfriend.
Thanksgiving, Again?!	2025	USA	When Tori volunteers to host her husband's loud Italian family for Thanksgiving, she finds herself stuck in a time loop, forced to survive endless rounds of overbearing relatives, family drama, and way too much turkey.
Sore: A Wife from the Future	2025	Indonesia	Jonathan, an Indonesian man living in Croatia, one day wakes up to find a woman beside him claims to be Sore, his wife from the future. At first he thinks that she's been sent by his manager as a practical joke to mess with him. Yet she knows so much about his life that Jonathan begins to believe that she might be who she claims to be. Every time Sore reveals a major fact to Jonathan, she bleeds out, dies and time is reset. Then the film goes back to a new meeting between Jonathan and Sore, with his memory of her erased and her claiming once again to be from the future.
All You Need Is Kill	2025	Japan	Two soldiers trapped in a time loop during an alien invasion try to find a way to win the conflict against the extraterrestrial invaders.
Good Luck, Have Fun, Don't Die	2025	USA	A man from the future who travels to the past to recruit patrons of a Los Angeles diner to help combat a rogue artificial intelligence.
Qaitadan	2025	Kazakhstan	A teenager goes to his grandmother's village, sleeping after watching a fallen star, finds himself in a time loop and every day ends with the dam breached destroying the village.
Dhoomakethu	2026	India	A man becomes trapped in a time loop during his wedding day, repeatedly experiencing the events surrounding the ceremony.

== See also ==
- List of time travel works of fiction
- Time travel in fiction
- Category:Time loop television series
- Category:Time loop television episodes
- Category:Video games about time loops
- Category:Time loop novels
