= Eternal return =

Concept of perpetual recurrence of time

In philosophy, eternal return (or eternal recurrence) is the concept stating that time repeats itself in an infinite loop, and that exactly the same events will continue to occur in exactly the same way, over and over again, for eternity.

In classical antiquity, the concept of eternal return was most prominently associated with Empedocles and with Stoicism, the school of philosophy founded by Zeno of Citium. The Stoics believed that the universe is periodically destroyed and reborn, and that each universe is exactly the same as the one before. This school of thought was fiercely criticized by Christian authors such as Augustine of Hippo, who saw it as a fundamental denial of the Christian ideas of sin, free will and salvation.

The concept was revived in the 19th century by German philosopher Friedrich Nietzsche. Having briefly presented the idea as a thought experiment in The Gay Science, he explored it more thoroughly in his novel Thus Spoke Zarathustra, in which the protagonist learns to overcome his horror of the thought of eternal return. It is not known whether Nietzsche believed in the literal truth of eternal return, or, if he did not, what he intended to demonstrate by it.

Nietzsche's ideas were subsequently taken up and reinterpreted by other writers, such as Russian esotericist P. D. Ouspensky, who argued that it was possible to break the cycle of return.

== Classical antiquity ==
=== Pythagoreanism ===
There are hints in ancient writings that the theory of eternal return may have originated with Pythagoras (c. 570 – c. 495 BC). According to Porphyry, it was one of the teachings of Pythagoras that "after certain specified periods, the same events occur again" and that "nothing was entirely new". Eudemus of Rhodes also references this Pythagorean doctrine in his commentary on Aristotle's Physics. In a fragment preserved by Simplicius, Eudemus writes:

One might raise the problem whether the same time recurs, as some say, or not. "The same" has many senses: the same in form seems to occur as do spring and winter and the other seasons and periods; similarly the same changes occur in form, for the sun performs its solstices and equinoxes and its other journeys. But if someone were to believe the Pythagoreans that numerically the same things recur, then I also will romance, holding my staff, while you sit there, and everything else will be the same, and it is plausible to say that the time will be the same.

=== Stoicism ===
The Stoics, possibly inspired by the Pythagoreans, incorporated the theory of eternal recurrence into their natural philosophy. According to Stoic physics, the universe is periodically destroyed in an immense conflagration (ekpyrosis), and then experiences a rebirth (palingenesis). These cycles continue for eternity, and the same events are exactly repeated in every cycle. The Stoics may have found support for this doctrine in the concept of the Great Year, the oldest known expression of which is found in Plato's Timaeus. Plato hypothesised that one complete cycle of time would be fulfilled when the sun, moon and planets all completed their various circuits and returned to their original positions.

Sources differ as to whether the Stoics believed that the contents of each new universe would be one and the same with those of the previous universe, or only so similar as to be indistinguishable. The former point of view was attributed to the Stoic Chrysippus (c. 279 – c. 206 BC) by Alexander of Aphrodisias, who wrote:

They hold that after the conflagration all the same things come to be again in the world numerically, so that even the same peculiarly qualified individual as before exists and comes to be again in that world, as Chrysippus says in his books On the World.

On the other hand, Origen (c. 185 – c. 253 AD) characterises the Stoics as claiming that the contents of each cycle will not be identical, but only indistinguishable:

To avoid supposing that Socrates will live again, they say that it will be some one indistinguishable from Socrates, who will marry some one indistinguishable from Xanthippe, and will be accused by men indistinguishable from Anytus and Meletus.

Origen also records a heterodox version of the doctrine, noting that some Stoics suggest that "there is a slight and very minute difference between one period and the events in the period before it". This was probably not a widely held belief, as it represents a denial of the deterministic viewpoint which stands at the heart of Stoic philosophy.

=== Christian response ===
Christian authors attacked the philosophy of eternal recurrence on various grounds. Origen argued that the theory was incompatible with free will (although he did allow the possibility of diverse and non-identical cycles). Augustine of Hippo (354–430 AD) objected to the fact that salvation was not possible in the Stoic scheme, arguing that even if a temporary happiness was attained, a soul could not be truly blessed if it was doomed to return again to misery.

Augustine also mentions "certain philosophers" who cite Ecclesiastes 1:9–10 as evidence of eternal return within Christianity: "What is that which hath been? It is that which shall be. And what is that which is done? It is that which shall be done: and there is no new thing under the sun. Who can speak and say, See, this is new? It hath been already of old time, which was before us." Augustine denies that this has reference to the recurrence of specific people, objects, and events, instead interpreting the passage in a more general sense. In support of his argument, he appeals to scriptural passages such as Romans 6:9, which affirms that Christ "being raised from the dead dieth no more".

== Friedrich Nietzsche ==
Eternal recurrence (German: Ewige Wiederkunft) is one of the central concepts of the philosophy of Friedrich Nietzsche (1844–1900). While the idea itself is not original to Nietzsche, his unique response to it gave new life to the theory, and speculation as to the correct interpretation of Nietzsche's doctrine continues to this day.

=== Precursors ===
The discovery of the laws of thermodynamics in the 19th century restarted the debate among scientists and philosophers about the ultimate fate of the universe, which brought in its train many questions about the nature of time. Eduard von Hartmann argued that the universe's final state would be identical to the state in which it had begun; Eugen Dühring rejected this idea, claiming that it carried with it the necessary consequence that the universe would begin again, and that the same forms would repeat themselves eternally, a doctrine which Dühring viewed as dangerously pessimistic. Johann Gustav Vogt, on the other hand, argued in favour of a cyclical system, additionally positing the spatial co-existence of an infinite number of identical worlds. Louis Auguste Blanqui similarly claimed that in an infinite universe, every possible combination of forms must repeat itself eternally across both time and space.

In his magnum opus The World as Will and Representation, Arthur Schopenhauer imagined a man “who desired, in spite of calm deliberation, that the course of his life as he had hitherto experienced it should be of endless duration or of constant recurrence.” Such a man, if he has “assimilated firmly into his way of thinking” the doctrine of the immortality of man’s inner most nature, “would have nothing to fear” from death.

=== Nietzsche's formulation ===
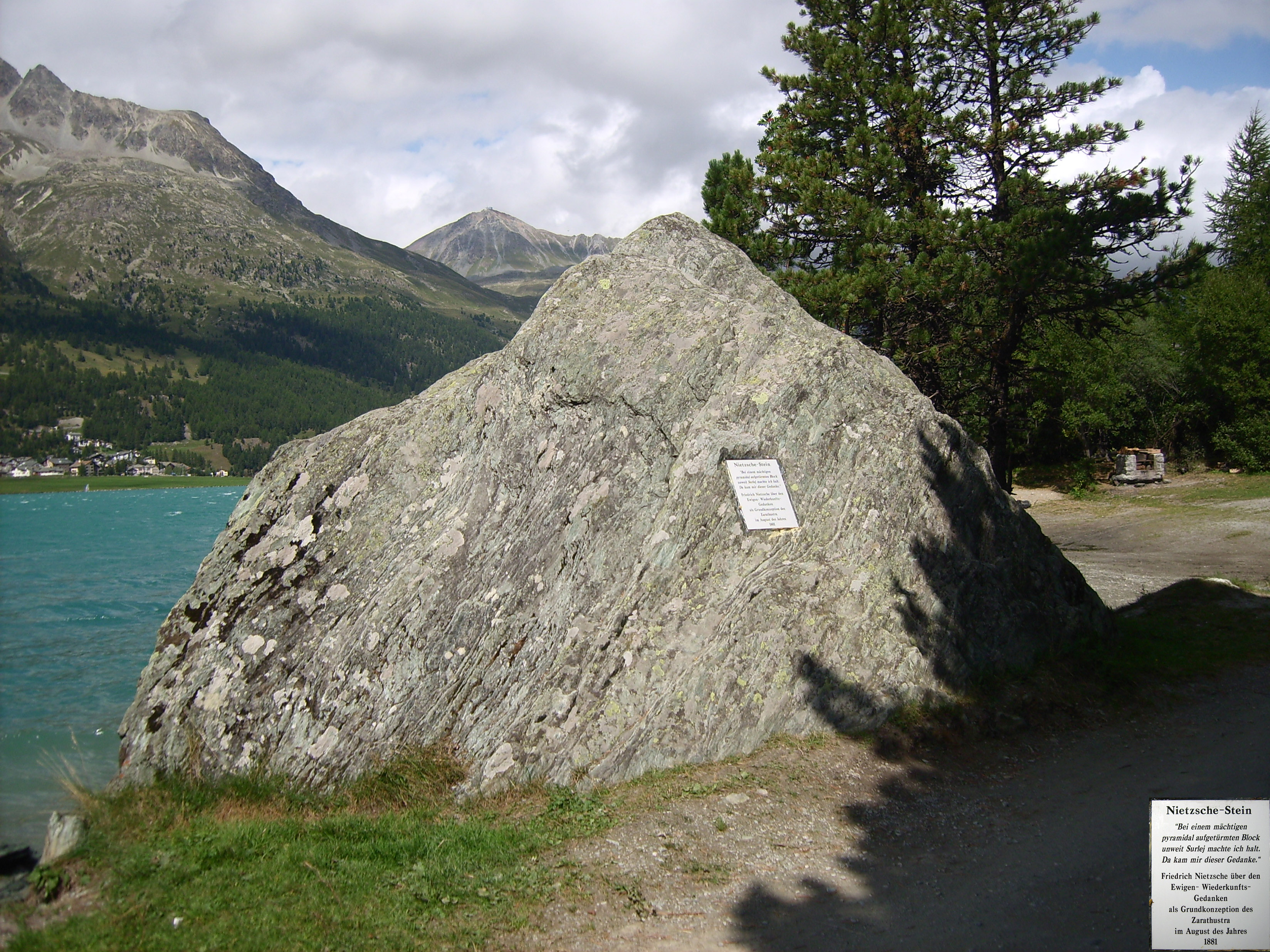
Nietzsche wrote that the concept of eternal return first occurred to him at Lake Silvaplana in Switzerland, "beside a huge rock that towered aloft like a pyramid".

Nietzsche may have drawn upon a number of sources in developing his own formulation of the theory. He had studied Pythagorean and Stoic philosophy, was familiar with the works of contemporary philosophers such as Dühring and Vogt, and may have encountered references to Blanqui in a book by Friedrich Albert Lange. He was also an admirer of the author Heinrich Heine, one of whose books contains a passage discussing the theory of eternal return. Nevertheless, Nietzsche claimed that the doctrine struck him one day as a sudden revelation, while walking beside Lake Silvaplana in Switzerland.

The first published presentation of Nietzsche's version of the theory appears in The Gay Science, section 341, where it is proposed to the reader as a thought experiment.

What if some day or night a demon were to steal after you into your loneliest loneliness, and say to you, "This life as you now live it and have lived it, you will have to live once more and innumerable times more; and there will be nothing new in it, but every pain and every joy and every thought and sigh and everything unutterably small or great in your life will have to return to you, all in the same succession and sequence" ... Would you not throw yourself down and gnash your teeth and curse the demon who spoke thus? Or have you once experienced a tremendous moment when you would have answered him: "You are a god and never have I heard anything more divine."

Nietzsche expanded upon this concept in the philosophical novel Thus Spoke Zarathustra, later writing that eternal return was "the fundamental idea of the work". In this novel, the titular Zarathustra is initially struck with horror at the thought that all things must recur eternally; ultimately, however, he overcomes his aversion to eternal return and embraces it as his most fervent desire. In the penultimate chapter of the work ("The Drunken Song"), Zarathustra declares: "All things are entangled, ensnared, enamored; if you ever wanted one thing twice, if you ever said, 'You please me, happiness! Abide, moment!' then you wanted all back ... For all joy wants—eternity."

=== Interpretation ===
Martin Heidegger points out that Nietzsche's first mention of eternal recurrence in The Gay Science presents this concept as a hypothetical question rather than postulating it as a fact. Many readings argue that Nietzsche was not attempting to make a cosmological or theoretical claim i.e. saying that eternal recurrence is a true statement about how the world works. Instead, the emotional reaction to the thought experiment serves to reveal whether one is living life to the best. As such, Nietzsche is concerned with questions pertaining not to ontology or natural sciences but essentially to ethics (in the original sense, i.e. as a discourse about the nature of [[the good life]] for individuals, rather than of right action and other-regarding virtue).

According to Heidegger, the significant point is the burden imposed by the question of eternal recurrence, regardless of whether or not such a thing could possibly be true. The idea is similar to Nietzsche's concept of amor fati, which he describes in Ecce Homo: "My formula for greatness in a human being is amor fati: that one wants nothing to be different, not forward, not backward, not in all eternity. Not merely to bear what is necessary, still less conceal it ... but love it."

On the other hand, Nietzsche's posthumously published notebooks contain an attempt at a logical proof of eternal return, which is often adduced in support of the claim that Nietzsche believed in the theory as a real possibility. The proof is based upon the premise that the universe is infinite in duration, but contains a finite quantity of energy. This being the case, all matter in the universe must pass through a finite number of combinations, and each series of combinations must eventually repeat in the same order, thereby creating "a circular movement of absolutely identical series". However, scholars such as Neil Sinhababu and Kuong Un Teng have suggested that the reason this material remained unpublished was because Nietzsche himself was unconvinced that his argument would hold up to scrutiny. (Note: One rebuttal of Nietzsche's theory, put forward by his contemporary Georg Simmel, is summarised by Walter Kaufmann as follows: "Even if there were exceedingly few things in a finite space in an infinite time, they would not have to repeat in the same configurations. Suppose there were three wheels of equal size, rotating on the same axis, one point marked on the circumference of each wheel, and these three points lined up in one straight line. If the second wheel rotated twice as fast as the first, and if the speed of the third wheel was 1/π of the speed of the first, the initial line-up would never recur.")

A third possibility is that Nietzsche was attempting to create a new ethical standard by which people should judge their own behaviour. In one of his unpublished notes, Nietzsche writes: "The question which thou wilt have to answer before every deed that thou doest: 'is this such a deed as I am prepared to perform an incalculable number of times?' is the best ballast." Taken in this sense, the doctrine has been compared to the categorical imperative of Immanuel Kant. Once again, however, the objection is raised that no such ethical imperative appears in any of Nietzsche's published writings, and this interpretation is therefore rejected by most modern scholars.

== P. D. Ouspensky ==
Russian esotericist P. D. Ouspensky (1878–1947) believed in the literal truth of eternal recurrence. As a child, he had been prone to vivid sensations of déjà vu, and when he encountered the theory of eternal return in the writings of Nietzsche, it occurred to him that this was a possible explanation for his experiences. He subsequently explored the idea in his semi-autobiographical novel, Strange Life of Ivan Osokin.

In this story, Ivan Osokin implores a magician to send him back to his childhood and give him the chance to live his life over again. The magician obliges, but warns Ivan that he will be unable to correct any of his mistakes. This turns out to be the case; although Ivan always knows in advance what the outcome of his actions will be, he is unable to keep himself from repeating those actions. Having relived his life up to the point of his conversation with the magician, Ivan asks in despair whether there is any way of changing the past. The magician answers that he must first change himself; if he works on improving his character, he may have a chance of making better decisions next time around.

The earliest version of the novel, however, did not include the magician, and ended on "a totally pessimistic note". The revolution in Ouspensky's thoughts on recurrence – the idea that change is possible – took place after he became a disciple of the mystic George Gurdjieff, who taught that a person could achieve a higher state of consciousness through a system of strict self-discipline. When Ouspensky asked about eternal recurrence, Gurdjieff told him:

This idea of repetition ... is not the full and absolute truth, but it is the nearest possible approximation of the truth ... And if you understand why I do not speak of this, you will be still nearer to it. What is the use of a man knowing about recurrence if he is not conscious of it and if he himself does not change? ... Knowledge about the repetition of lives will add nothing for a man ... if he does not strive to change himself in order to escape this repetition. But if he changes something essential in himself, that is, if he attains something, this cannot be lost.

Ouspensky incorporated this idea into his later writings. In A New Model of the Universe, he argued against Nietzsche's proof of the mathematical necessity of eternal repetition, claiming that a large enough quantity of matter would be capable of an infinite number of possible combinations. According to Ouspensky, everyone is reborn again into the same life at the moment of their death, and many people will indeed continue to live the exact same lives for eternity, but it is also possible to break the cycle and enter into a new plane of existence.

== Science and mathematics ==
The Poincaré recurrence theorem states that certain dynamical systems, such as particles of gas in a sealed container, will return infinitely often to a state arbitrarily close to their original state. The theorem, first advanced by Henri Poincaré in 1890, remains influential, and is today the basis of ergodic theory. Attempts have been made to prove or disprove the possibility of Poincaré recurrence in a system the size of a galaxy or a universe. Philosopher Michael Huemer has argued that if this is so, then reincarnation can be proved by a person's current existence, using Bayesian probability theory.

== See also ==
- Eternalism (philosophy of time) – Philosophical view that there is no correct way of perceiving the passage of time
- Historic recurrence – Repetition of similar events in history
- List of films featuring time loops
- Ouroboros – Symbolic serpent with its tail in its mouth
- Poincaré recurrence theorem
- Strange loop – Cycles going through a hierarchy
- Wheel of time – Religious and philosophical concept of cyclical, repeating epochs or ages
- Brahma Kumaris – Spiritual organization (1936) (which features recurrence as a core belief)
