= 12:01 P.M. =

Short story by Richard A. Lupoff

- Short story by Richard A. Lupoff
- Country: United States
- Language: English
- Genre: Science fiction

Publication
- Published in: The Magazine of Fantasy and Science Fiction
- Publication type: Periodical
- Media type: Print (Magazine)
- Publication date: December 1973

Chronology
—	12:02 P.M.

"12:01 P.M." is a short story by American writer Richard A. Lupoff, which was published in the December 1973 edition of The Magazine of Fantasy and Science Fiction. The story was twice adapted by Hollywood, first in 1990 as a short film, and again in 1993 as a television movie. Lupoff appeared in both films as an extra.

The major plot device is a time loop or time bounce, and bears great similarity to that of 1993's Groundhog Day. Lupoff and Jonathan Heap, director of the 1990 film, were "outraged" by the apparent theft of the idea, but after six months of lawyers' conferences, they decided to drop the case against Columbia Pictures.

Decades later, Lupoff returned to the story with two sequels, "12:02 P.M.", published in the January/February 2011 edition of The Magazine of Fantasy and Science Fiction, and "12:03 P.M.", published in the September/October 2012 edition of the same magazine.

== Plot summary ==
It is 12:01 PM, and Myron Castleman, an executive in New York City, finds that he is reliving the same hour of the same day, over and over. His time loop starts at 12:01 PM and lasts until 1:00 PM, when he is somehow returned to the same place where he began the hour. All the people around him are unaware of the loop, and everyone repeats their actions exactly over the course of the hour, except insofar as they interact with Castleman. In one of his loops, Castleman learns of a local physicist's theory that appears to describe his situation. The physicist, Nathan Rosenbluth, theorized a "disfiguration of time" that could cause the universe to snap backward and repeat the period of one hour. Over his next three time-loops, Castleman tries desperately to contact Rosenbluth and ask him for advice. In the last of these attempts, Castleman collapses, suffering a heart attack. He realizes he is dying, but is grateful that this will finally break the loop and free him. He dies, and the hour of 1:00 PM arrives. Castleman awakens and sees he has been returned to the place where he begins every hour. The time is 12:01 PM.

== Adaptations ==
=== 1990 film ===
"12:01 PM" was first adapted into an Academy Award—nominated 1990 short film starring Kurtwood Smith. Directed by Jonathan Heap, it originally aired on the cable television network Showtime in 1990 as part of their 30-Minute Movie anthology series.

In this version, Kurtwood Smith plays Myron Castleman, an everyman-type who keeps repeating the same hour of his life, from 12:01pm to 1:00pm. The character is fully aware that the time loop is occurring, and nobody else appears to be aware of it. Each time the hour resets, Myron retains his memory (or, as the film puts it, his consciousness), and despite his best attempts to understand what is happening, he ultimately realizes that he is entirely helpless to prevent the time bounce. Myron cannot even break the loop by killing himself, as he reappears, alive, at the next iteration; he is trapped in the loop for eternity.

This version has not been released on DVD or VHS in the United States, but 12:01 PM is available on DVD in the UK, collected with seven other short films.

=== 1993 film ===
12:01 is an adaptation of the same short story, produced as a television movie in 1993. It stars Helen Slater, Jonathan Silverman, Jeremy Piven, and Martin Landau, and it originally aired on the Fox Network in the United States. In this version, Silverman's character, Barry Thomas, keeps reliving the same 24-hour period (which in this case restarts at one minute past midnight, rather than midday as in the other versions). Slater plays his romantic interest, and Piven provides comic relief as his best friend. This version differs from the short film in that it features a much lighter and more comedic tone, and the protagonist ultimately finds a way to correct the time loop over the course of the film. This version was released on DVD in the United States on November 28, 2006.
