= The Fourth Way (book) =

1957 book by P.D. Oespenski

- First edition
- Author: P.D. Ouspensky
- Language: English
- Subject: Fourth Way
- Genre: Philosophy; Spiritual; Self-help
- Publisher: Alfred A. Knopf
- Publication date: 1957
- Publication place: United States
- Media type: Print (Paperback)
- Pages: 480 (paperback edition)
- ISBN: 0-394-71672-8 (2000)
- OCLC: 10441619
- Preceded by: In Search of the Miraculous

The Fourth Way (1957) is a book about the Fourth Way, a system of self-development as introduced by Greek-Armenian philosopher G.I. Gurdjieff. It is a compilation of the lectures of P. D. Ouspensky at London and New York City between the years 1921 through 1946, published posthumously by his students in 1957.

The term "The Fourth Way" has also come to be used as a general descriptive term for the body of ideas and teachings which Gurdjieff brought to the west from his study of eastern schools.

Ouspensky was given the task of bringing these ideas to a wider audience in an unadulterated form by Gurdjieff. The Fourth Way is considered to be the most comprehensive statement of Gurdjieff's ideas as taught by Ouspensky. The book consists of adaptations of Ouspensky's lectures, and the accompanying question and answer sessions.

== The Fourth Way ==
The 'Fourth Way' to which the title refers is a method of inner development - "the way of the sly man," as Gurdjieff described it. Rather than the three commonly known ways of enlightenment—physical, spiritual, and emotional—The Fourth Way presents a new way of reaching enlightenment, a more effective combination of the three known ways. This way is to be followed under the ordinary conditions of everyday life, as opposed from the three traditional ways that call for retirement from the world: those of the fakir, the monk, and the yogi, which Gurdjieff maintained could only result in partial, unbalanced development of man's potential.
