= Strange Life of Ivan Osokin =

1915 novel by P. D. Ouspensky

- A book cover of the 1st English edition, 1947
- Author: Pyotr Demyanovich Ouspensky
- Original title: Странная жизнь Ивана Осокина
- Language: Russian
- Publication date: 1915
- Publication place: Russian Empire
- English publication date: 1947
- Media type: Print (Hardback)
- Pages: 166 (hardback, first English edition)

Strange Life of Ivan Osokin (Russian: Странная жизнь Ивана Осокина) is a 1915 novel by P. D. Ouspensky. It follows the unsuccessful struggle of Ivan Osokin to correct his mistakes when given a chance to relive his past. The novel serves as a narrative platform for Nietzsche's theory of eternal recurrence. The conclusion fully anticipates the Fourth Way philosophy, which typified Ouspensky's later works. In particular the final chapter's description of the shocking realization of the mechanical nature of existence, its consequences, and the possibility/responsibility of working in an esoteric school.

== Plot summary ==
When the protagonist realizes that he can recall having lived his life before, he decides to try to change it. But he discovers that, because human choices tend to be mechanical, changing the outcome of one's actions is extremely difficult. He realizes that without help breaking his mechanical behavior, he may be doomed to repeat the same mistakes forever.

== Characters ==
- Ivan Osokin, the main character of the novel
- The Magician, a minor but important character who makes appearances at the beginning and the end of the novel. A possible reference to Ouspensky's teacher, George Gurdjieff.

== Literary significance and reception ==
Harold Ramis, who directed Groundhog Day, found the meaning of Strange Life of Ivan Osokin similar to the existential dilemma of Groundhog Day. Both works imply that a sober acceptance of personal accountability is necessary in order to effect an increase in the degree of freedom of the individual. Ramis' opinion is printed in the Lindisfarne Books' 2004 edition of Strange Life of Ivan Osokin.

== Publication history ==
WorldCat lists 12 editions of the novel.

- 1915, First Edition, Russia, publisher, Pub date ?? ??? 1915
- 1947, Limited Edition (356 copies), UK, Stourton Press, OCLC 504417679, Pub date ?? Oct 1947
- 1947, First Trade Edition, US, Holmes ISBN 0-571-09587-9, ISBN 978-0-571-09587-2, OCLC 2223435, Pub date ?? ??? 1947, Hardback
- 1948, First Edition, UK, Faber & Faber, ISBN 0-571-09587-9, Pub date ?? ??? 1948, Hardback
- 1947, Lindisfarne Books, US, ISBN 1-58420-005-7 Paperback
